= Bald Head Light =

Lighthouse in North Carolina, US

Bald Head Lighthouse
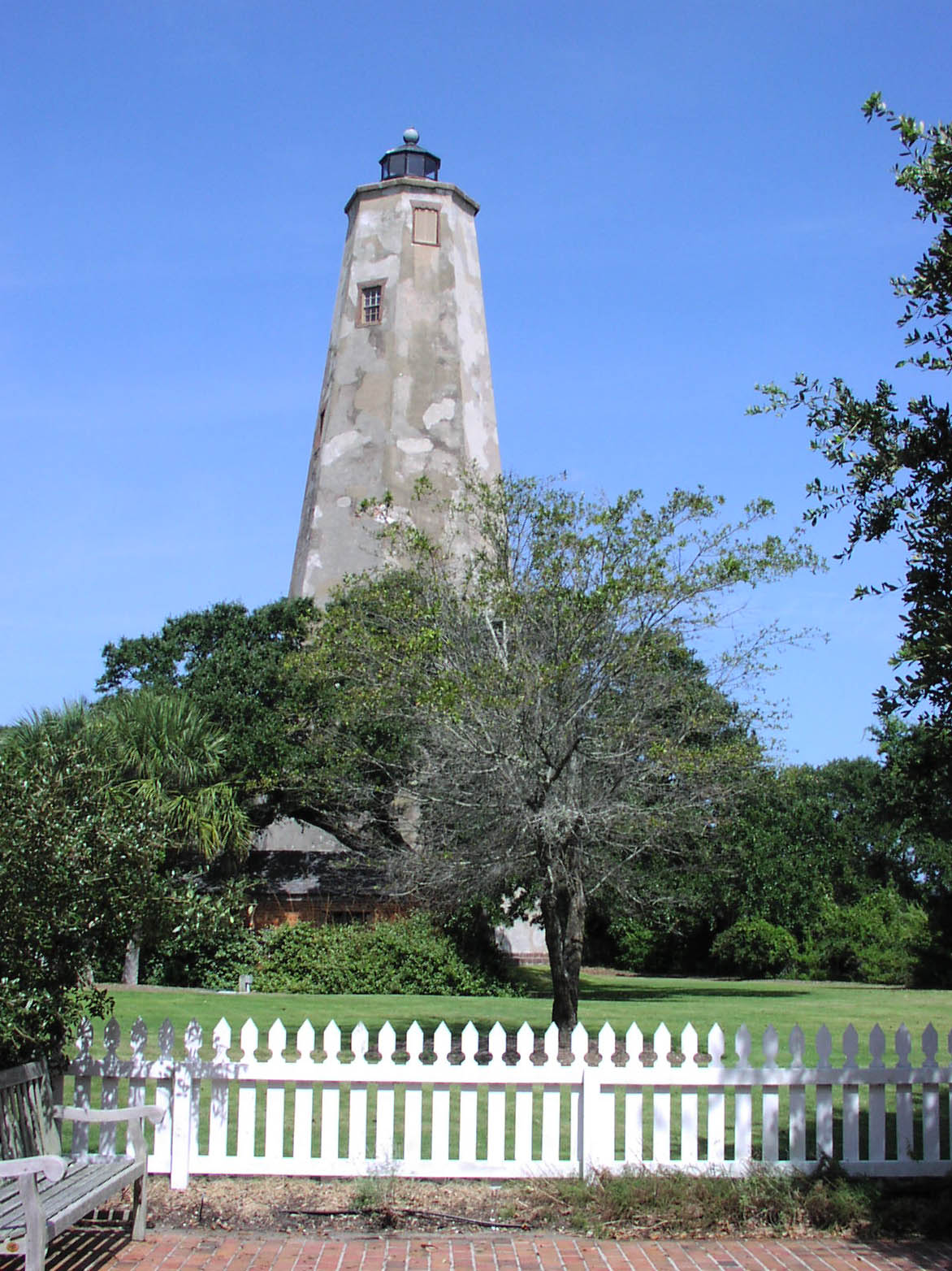
- "Old Baldy"
- Location: Bald Head Island, Cape Fear River, North Carolina
- Coordinates: 33°52′24.5″N 78°0′1.25″W

Tower
- Constructed: 1817
- Foundation: Dressed stone
- Construction: Brick
- Height: 110 feet (34 m)
- Shape: Octagonal
- Markings: Mottled stucco plaster (originally white)
- Heritage: National Register of Historic Places listed place

Light
- First lit: 1817
- Deactivated: light beacon, 1935 radio beacon, 1958
- Focal height: 34 m (112 ft)
- Lens: 15 Lewis lamps, 1817; 3rd order Fresnel lens, 1855; 4th order fixed Fresnel lens, 1903 to 1935
- Range: 14-15 miles (Fresnel lens)
- Characteristic: fixed white 1817 flashing red with 30 second delay 1834 flashing white 1893 fixed white, 1903 to 1935
- Bald Head Island Lighthouse
- U.S. National Register of Historic Places
- Nearest city: Southport, North Carolina
- Area: 2 acres (0.81 ha)
- Architect: D.S. Way
- NRHP reference No.: 75001242
- Added to NRHP: April 28, 1975

Bald Head Lighthouse, known locally as Old Baldy, is the oldest lighthouse still standing in North Carolina. It is the second of three lighthouses that have been built on Bald Head Island since the 18th century to help guide ships past the dangerous shoals at the mouth of the Cape Fear river.

== History ==
A 10-acre (4.0 ha) site on the west side of Bald Head Island, along the banks of the Cape Fear River, was selected for North Carolina's first lighthouse. The property was purchased from Benjamin Smith, who would later become the governor of North Carolina.

On April 2, 1792, the same day as the Coinage Act of 1792, Congress appropriated $4,000 to complete the lighthouse that had been started by the North Carolina Colony before becoming part of the United States.

Work on the lighthouse was overseen by Abisha Woodward, who would later build five lighthouses along the Connecticut coast and one in New York on the east end of Long Island, two of which still stand at New London, and Falkner's Island.

The lighthouse, which was first activated on December 23, 1794, directed traffic to the Cape Fear River and the growing port of Wilmington, located several miles upstream.

In less than two decades, this lighthouse was threatened due to severe erosion of the riverbank. Between 1813 and 1817, funds were approved for rebuilding Bald Head Lighthouse.

The replacement lighthouse now known as "Old Baldy" was completed by 1817. Old Baldy was built further inland where it would not be threatened by shifting sands along the river for just under $16,000 using bricks salvaged from the old tower. A stone plaque above the entrance identifies the builder as Daniel S. Way, and the foundry for the lantern room, that was also salvaged from the old tower, as R. Cochran. The octagonal brick tower is coated with stucco and stands 110 feet (34 m) high, the exterior was originally whitewashed and later painted white. At its base, the tower is 36 feet (11 m) wide and at its top 14.25 feet (4.34 m) wide, while the walls are 5 feet (1.5 m) thick at the base and taper to 2.5 feet (0.76 m) at the top. The rectangular stairway leading up the inside of the tower is made of Carolina yellow pine. The lantern room sits on top of one of the tower support beams which makes it offset from the center of the tower. Old Baldy was originally equipped with an array of 15 lamps and reflectors, and as technology improved, it later housed a Fresnel lens.

Old Baldy was first lit in 1817 by keeper, Sedgwick Springs, a veteran of the American Revolution and owner of the nearby Sedgely Abbey Plantation. He had been appointed to the position in 1806 at the behest of US President Thomas Jefferson and served as the light keeper at Bald Head for more than 30 years. The Bald Head Lighthouse soon proved to be inadequate especially during bad weather.

On July 1, 1834, Capt. Henry D. Hunter of the revenue cutter Taney inspected Bald Head Light which he described as having 15 lamps, 109 feet above the level of the sea, showing a fixed light. Two years later in 1836 he again inspected the light station. "The keeper is an old revolutionary soldier," he reported "and is unable from sickness to give the lighthouse his constant personal attention. The light, however, shows well from a distance." Keeper Springs was eighty years old at the time of the report and died the following year after being in charge of the Bald Head lighthouse for more than thirty years.

Some problems with the Bald Head Lighthouse included its location as well as its inadequate height and illumination. Positioned some four miles from the eastern end of the island and equipped with a minor light, the lighthouse was unsuccessful in guiding ships safely past Frying Pan Shoals especially during storms and fog. A lightship was therefore placed out on the shoals in 1854.

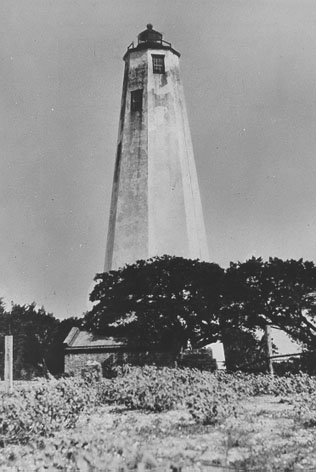
Undated USCG photo

A Jones fog bell was placed near Bald Head Lighthouse in 1855. In the same year the Lighthouse Board recommended improving the light by replacing the original apparatus with a third-order Fresnel lens. It also recommended a fixed light, varied by flashes "to distinguish this light, under all circumstances, from Federal Point Light."

In 1866 Bald Head Light was discontinued after a new lighthouse was built at the mouth of the Cape Fear River to replace the screw pile Federal Point Light that had been destroyed by Confederate troops during the Civil War. In 1880, however, Federal Point Light had been rendered useless and was discontinued because of the closing of the New Inlet Channel by the Engineer Department. Bald Head Light was relighted at that time and, together with a small stake light on the beach in front of it, served as a guide through the 16- to 18-foot Oak Island Channel across the bar.

Requests for funds to increase the height of Old Baldy and install a more powerful first-order lens to make it a coastal beacon, as had been done at Cape Hatteras in 1854 and Tybee Island in 1866, were never approved. Instead, in 1898 the Lighthouse Board approved the construction a new 184-foot cast iron skeleton tower equipped with a first order lens named the Cape Fear Lighthouse, to be located on the southeastern end of Bald Head Island, where it could mark the shoals. The Cape Fear Light served as a coastal beacon from 1903 to 1958.

After the construction of the Cape Fear Lighthouse, Old Baldy continued to serve as an active lighthouse with a fourth-order fixed beacon until 1935, and it housed a radio beacon until 1958. It was used mostly to help guide ships into the mouth of the Cape Fear River. After the construction of the Oak Island Lighthouse in 1958, Old Baldy and the Cape Fear Lighthouse were both decommissioned. The Cape Fear lighthouse was demolished but Old Baldy still stands as a day beacon and symbol of Bald Head Island. The lighthouse has been restored and is open to the public.

It was added to the National Register of Historic Places in 1975 as Bald Head Island Lighthouse.

In 1995 Jacob Arthur, grandson of Charlie Frank House, Jr. (a contributor to the lighthouse's restoration and preservation) unveiled the plaque that stands in the foyer today. This plaque commemorated the re-opening of the Old Baldy Lighthouse after years of renovations.

In October 1999 the body of local police officer Davina Buff Jones was found near the light late one night. She had died from a gunshot wound to the head. It was ruled a suicide initially; in 2013 the Brunswick County district attorney reopened the case and changed the cause of death to undetermined. Her family and some other officers on the island's police department believe that, while there were things going on in her life that could have led her to take it, the circumstances point to a homicide.>

== Keepers ==
- Henry Long (1794 – 1806)
- Sedgwick Springs (1807 – 1837)
- Bryan Morse (1837 – 1848)
- Francis Morse (1848 – 1853)
- William R. Sellers (1853 – 1857)
- James R. Flowers (1857 – 1859)
- T. M. Thompson (1859 - light extinguished during Civil War)
- John Bell (1865 – 1866)
- James S. Sanders (1866)
- Joseph A. Bell (1879 – 1881)
- John R. Newton (1881 – 1882)
- Asa Ross (1882)
- John Lunts (1903 – 1903)
- James Henry Dosher (1882 – at least 1913)

== Smith Island Museum of History ==
The Old Baldy Foundation operates Old Baldy and the adjacent Smith Island Museum of History, which is located in a replica of one of the original lighthouse keeper's quarters from the 1850s and features period furnishings, lighthouse artifacts including parts of the lens from the Cape Fear Lighthouse, and exhibits about the history of Old Baldy and the island.

== Hurricane Fran ==
When Hurricane Fran struck the southern North Carolina coast on September 5, 1996, there were a few residents remaining on Bald Head Island. When wind speeds climbed past hurricane strength, some islanders fled their houses and sought shelter inside the Bald Head Lighthouse. The lighthouse suffered minimal damage. It is possibly one of the safest structures on the island; its construction of brick and plaster five feet thick has weathered many storms and is now known to withstand at least Category 3 hurricanes.
