= Stratford Shoal Light =

Stratford Shoal Light Middle Ground
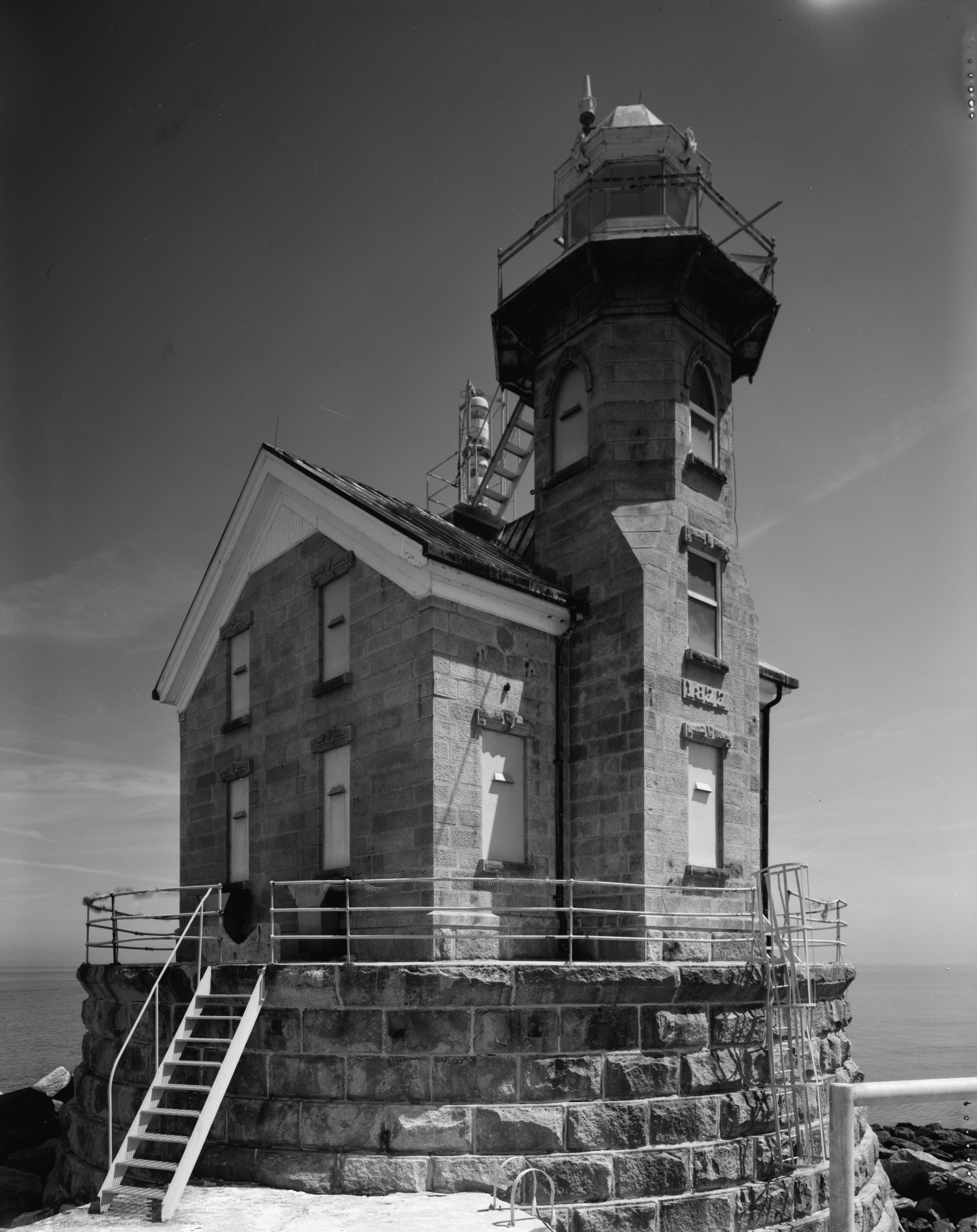
- Stratford Shoal Light in 1997
- Location: Long Island Sound; Fairfield County; Connecticut; United States
- Coordinates: 41°3′35.3″N 73°6′4.7″W

Tower
- Constructed: 1837 (lightship)
- Foundation: granite ashlar caisson
- Construction: granite tower
- Automated: 1970
- Height: 35 feet (11 m)
- Shape: octagonal tower
- Markings: unpainted tower, white lantern
- Operator: United States Coast Guard
- Heritage: National Register of Historic Places listed place
- Fog signal: 2s. blast every 15s.
- Racon: Y

Light
- First lit: 1877 (first tower, still active)
- Focal height: 60 feet (18 m)
- Lens: Fourth order Fresnel lens (original), VRB-25 (current)
- Range: 13 nautical miles (24 km; 15 mi)
- Characteristic: Fl W 5s.
- Stratford Shoal Lighthouse
- U.S. National Register of Historic Places
- Nearest city: Stratford, Connecticut
- Area: less than one acre
- Built: 1878
- Architect: Howell, D.V.
- MPS: Operating Lighthouses in Connecticut MPS
- NRHP reference No.: 89001477
- Added to NRHP: May 29, 1990

Stratford Shoal Light, officially Stratford Shoal (Middle Ground) Light, is a lighthouse on a shoal in the middle of Long Island Sound approximately halfway between Port Jefferson, New York and Bridgeport, Connecticut.

== Location ==
The Stratford Shoal Light is located roughly midway between New York and Connecticut (hence its alternate name Middleground or Middle Ground Light), 5 nautical miles (9.3 km; 5.8 mi) from Old Field Point Light in New York and 5.5 nautical miles (10.2 km; 6.3 mi) from Stratford Point Light in Connecticut. There was some debate about whether the lighthouse is New York or Connecticut. It was originally the state of New York, not Connecticut, which ceded the area on which the lighthouse is located to the federal government, but most modern official maps place it within Connecticut's side of Long Island Sound by about 1,000 feet (300 m).

The lighthouse is located on Stratford (or Middleground) Shoal which is a little over a mile in diameter and as little as nine feet below mean lower low water. The shoal has been identified as a danger to navigation for centuries.

== History ==
Adriaen Block, the first European to explore Long Island Sound, identified two low islands at the site of current Stratford Shoal during his 1614 voyage. These islands were eroded below the surface of the water within 100 or 200 years. The shoal was first marked for navigation in 1820 by a pair of spar buoys placed on its north and south ends. In 1831, Congress appropriated $1,000 to erect a warning beacon on the shoal, but no further action was taken on the project. The beacon was to have had the shape of an iron spindle.

=== Lightship LV-15 ===
Congress next appropriated $10,000 for the construction of a "floating light for Middle Ground, Long Island Sound". Built in Norfolk, Virginia 1837, the lightship constructed was 73 feet (22 m) long and weighed 100 tons. It carried a lantern on each of its two masts, plus a hand-operated bell and a foghorn as fog signals. The lightship was anchored off the southeastern edge of Stratford Shoal on January 12, 1838; just eight days later, it drifted off its station. The lightship would display a chronic inability to hold its station in future years, even after its single anchor chain was supplemented with second and third anchors. It was dragged from its station by ice more than half a dozen times, most notably in 1875 when it ran aground at Orient Point, and in 1876 when it drifted to Faulkner Island.

When standard hull numbers were assigned to lightships in 1867, the Stratford Shoals lightship was named LV-15; previously it had been known as "Middle Ground floating light", "Stratford Shoal Light Vessel," or "Stratford Point Light Vessel".

=== Lighthouse ===
The Stratford Shoal lighthouse was completed in 1877 to replace the lightship. The lighthouse was constructed on a small, man-made island (on the spot of two former natural islands that were washed over by the sea). Originally, lighthouse keepers were utilized to maintain the facility. The lighthouse was automated in 1970 and is currently an active aid to navigation.

It has historical significance as an example of the masonry lighthouse design used in waterbound U.S. lighthouses immediately before the use of sparkplug lighthouses. It is similar to some Hudson River lighthouses, and "embodies the enormous cost and heroic effort required to put these designs in place in the treacherous waters of Long Island Sound."

=== Yacht Racing ===
Several local yacht clubs located on Long Island Sound use the lighthouse as a midpoint or rounding marker for races all called the Stratford Shoals Race. One annual regatta dating back to 1931 organized by Riverside Yacht Club continues to this day; while others are more recent including 2018 races by Lloyd Harbor YC, Seawanhaka Corinthian Yacht Club, and the New York Athletic Club.

== Head keepers ==
- Alexander Rohman 2023–Present
- William McGloin 1877 – 1880
- James G. Scott 1880 – 1885
- Ezra S. Mott 1885 – 1888
- Elisha E. Davis 1888 – 1893
- Richard E. Ray 1894 – 1900
- Herman Burke 1900 – 1901
- Gilbert L. Rulon 1901 – 1910
- Alfred Nelsen 1910 – 1913
- Emil M. Usinger 1915
- Victor Larson 1917
- Colby H. Crandall 1919
- Henry R. McCarthy 1921 – 1922
- Lewis J. Allen 1930 – 1940
- Harry C. Buede 1955 – 1962

== See also ==
- List of lighthouses in Connecticut
- List of lighthouses in the United States
- National Register of Historic Places listings in Fairfield County, Connecticut
