= Fenwick, Connecticut =

- Borough
- Borough of Fenwick
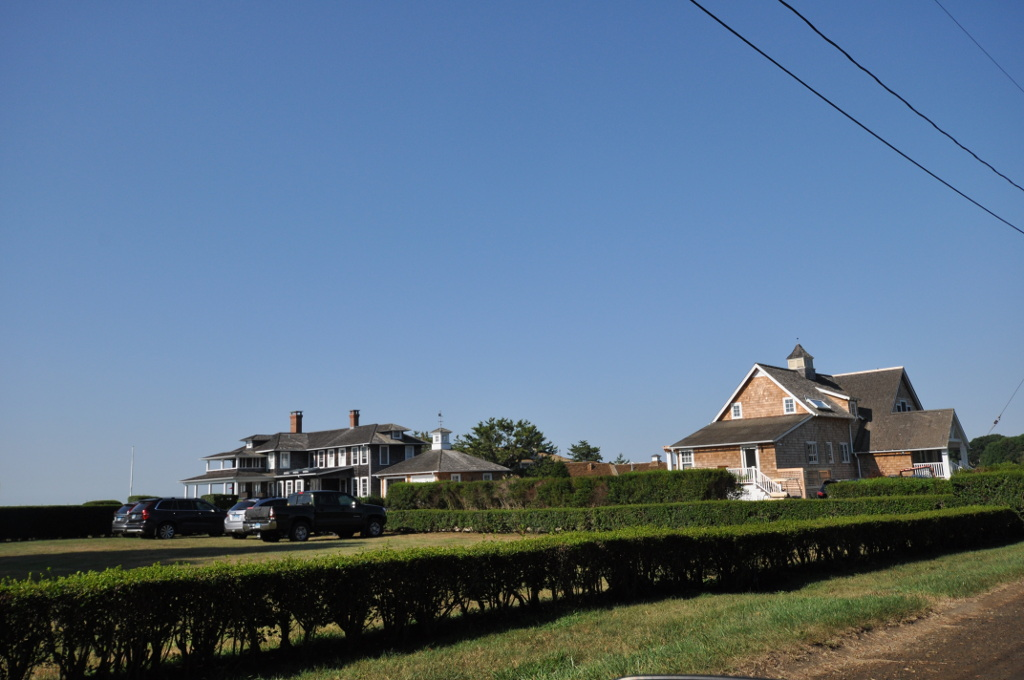

- Flag Seal
- Interactive map of Fenwick, Connecticut
- Coordinates: 41°16′12″N 72°21′26″W
- Country: United States
- U.S. state: Connecticut
- County: Middlesex
- Region: Lower CT River Valley
- Town: Old Saybrook

Area
  - Total: 0.39 sq mi (1.01 km^{2})
  - Land: 0.39 sq mi (1.01 km^{2})
  - Water: 0 sq mi (0.00 km^{2})
- Elevation: 30 ft (9 m)

Population (2020)
  - Total: 53
  - Density: 136/sq mi (52.5/km^{2})
- Time zone: UTC-5 (Eastern (EST))
  - Summer (DST): UTC-4 (EDT)
- ZIP Code: 06475 (Old Saybrook)
- Area codes: 860/959
- FIPS code: 09-27810
- GNIS feature ID: 0207058
- Website: www.boroughoffenwick.com

- Fenwick Historic District
- U.S. National Register of Historic Places
- U.S. Historic district
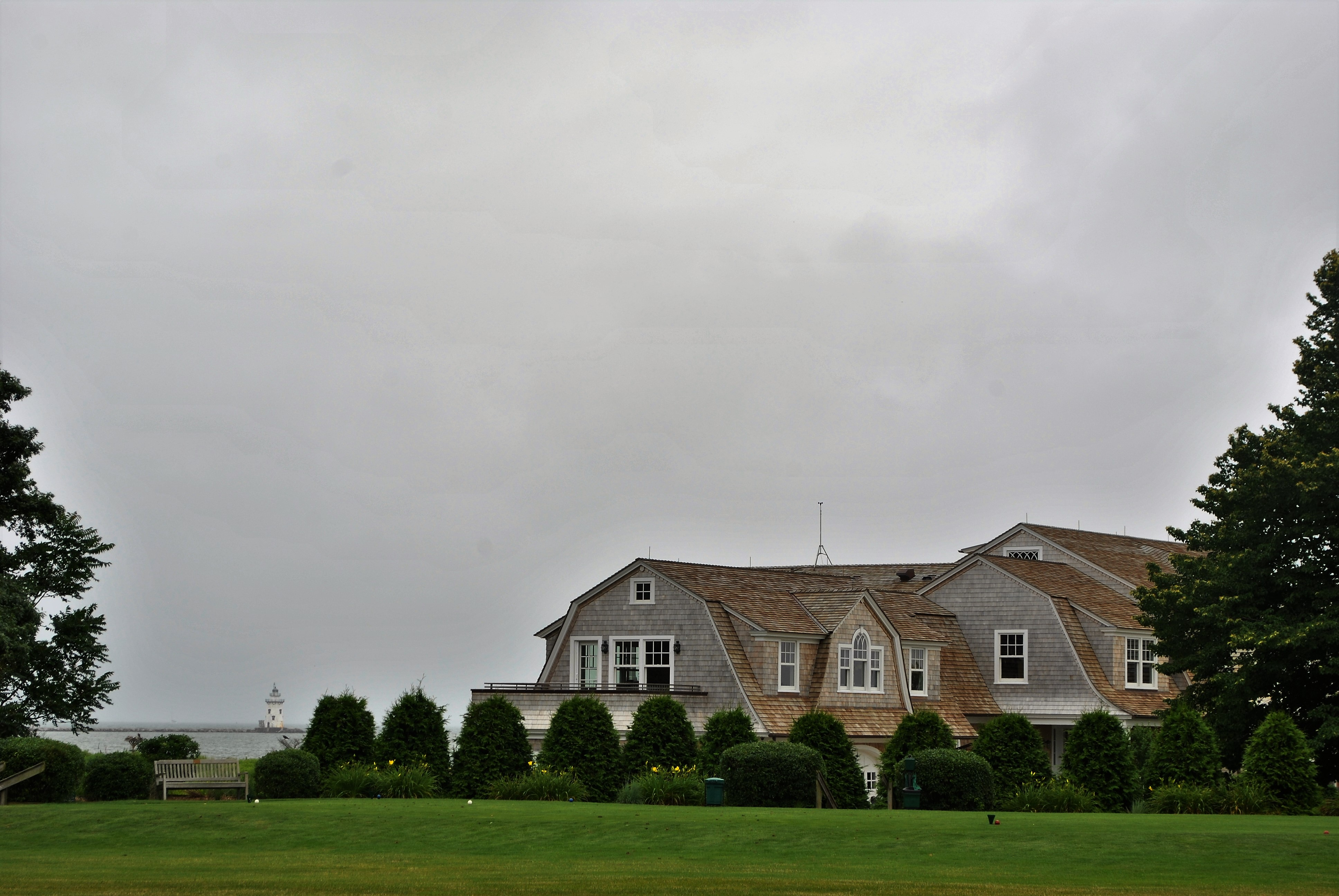
- Location: Roughly, along Agawam, Neponset and Pettipaug Avenues
- Coordinates: 41°16′14″N 72°21′23″W
- Area: 195 acres (79 ha)
- Architect: Multiple
- Architectural style: Shingle Style, Queen Anne, Bungalow/Craftsman
- NRHP reference No.: 95000437
- Added to NRHP: April 13, 1995

Fenwick is a borough in Middlesex County, Connecticut, United States, in the town of Old Saybrook. The borough is part of the Lower Connecticut River Valley Planning Region. The population was 53 at the 2020 census, making it the least populous borough in Connecticut. Most of the borough is included in the Fenwick Historic District, listed on the National Register of Historic Places.

Fenwick is set off from the town center of Old Saybrook by a large cove crossed by a causeway. It is located exactly where the Connecticut River flows into Long Island Sound, and sits on the river's west side. The town has two lighthouses, the Inner and the Outer. The Inner is at the tip of Lynde Point, Fenwick's peninsula, and the Outer is a quarter mile off shore, connected by a rough jetty. The Outer Light is the lighthouse shown on many Connecticut license plates.

== Fenwick Historic District ==
The Fenwick Historic District covers an area of approximately 195 acres (79 ha) and was added to the National Register of Historic Places in 1995. It includes 60 buildings in the center of Fenwick, as well as the Fenwick Golf Course.

Architecturally, the Fenwick Historic District is composed largely of Shingle-style residences from early in the century. The Historic District comprises the bulk of the community, however some residences were built in the 1950s in a more modern style. Of the district's 60 main buildings, 17 represent examples of the Shingle style, with some others in Queen Anne or Victorian styles. Frequent features include gable-on-hip roofs that encompass side porches with minimalist wood bracing, creating a sense of heaviness characteristic of the Shingle style. Other frequently observed common architectural features include flares at the eaves of roofs, upper stories that overhang lower stories, and pent roofs over windows and doors. All of the three are typified in St. Mary's-By-the-Sea, a 1 and 1/2 story church building at 30 Agawam Avenue, designed by Francis Goodwin and built in 1883.

In the late 1800s The Fenwick Golf Course was created from several empty lots in the center of the district and is the site of the Stephen Potter Cup. The 9-hole golf course has changed layouts on several occasions, with the most recent re-design in the 1930s following acquisition of the course by the British manufacturer Armitage Shanks.

== Geography ==
Fenwick is in the southeastern corner of Middlesex County and is bordered to the east by the Connecticut River and the south by Long Island Sound. The main road is CT 154, which goes over the bay on the north side of the borough and leads 2.5 miles (4.0 km) to Old Saybrook Center.

According to the United States Census Bureau, the borough has a total area of 0.4 square miles (1.0 km^{2}), all land.

Historical population
Census	Pop.	Note	%±
1900	23		—
1910	34		47.8%
1920	13		−61.8%
1930	6		−53.8%
1950	16		—
1960	36		125.0%
1970	45		25.0%
1980	41		−8.9%
1990	89		117.1%
2000	52		−41.6%
2010	43		−17.3%
2020	53		23.3%
U.S. Decennial Census

== Demographics ==
As of the 2000 census, there were 52 people, 26 households, and 17 families residing in the borough. The population density was 121.9 inhabitants per square mile (47.1/km^{2}). There were 83 housing units at an average density of 194.5 per square mile (75.1/km^{2}). The racial makeup of the borough was 100.00% White.

There were 26 households, of which 11.5% had children under the age of 18 living with them, 57.7% were married couples living together, 3.8% had a female householder with no husband present, and 34.6% were non-families. 26.9% of all households were made up of individuals, and 15.4% had someone living alone who was 65 years of age or older. The average household size was 2.00 and the average family size was 2.41.

In the borough the population was spread out, with 11.5% under the age of 18, 1.9% from 18 to 24, 25.0% from 25 to 44, 23.1% from 45 to 64, and 38.5% who were 65 years of age or older. The median age was 58 years. For every 100 females, there were 100.0 males. For every 100 females age 18 and over, there were 91.7 males.

The median income for a household in the borough was $57,500, and the median income for a family was $60,625. Males had a median income of $50,625 versus $16,250 for females. The per capita income for the borough was $38,135. None of the population and none of the families were below the poverty line.

== Notable people ==
- Katharine Hepburn, actress; lifelong resident, died in Fenwick on June 29, 2003, at the age of 96
- John Lindsay, New York City mayor
- Rosemary Murphy, actress

== Gallery ==
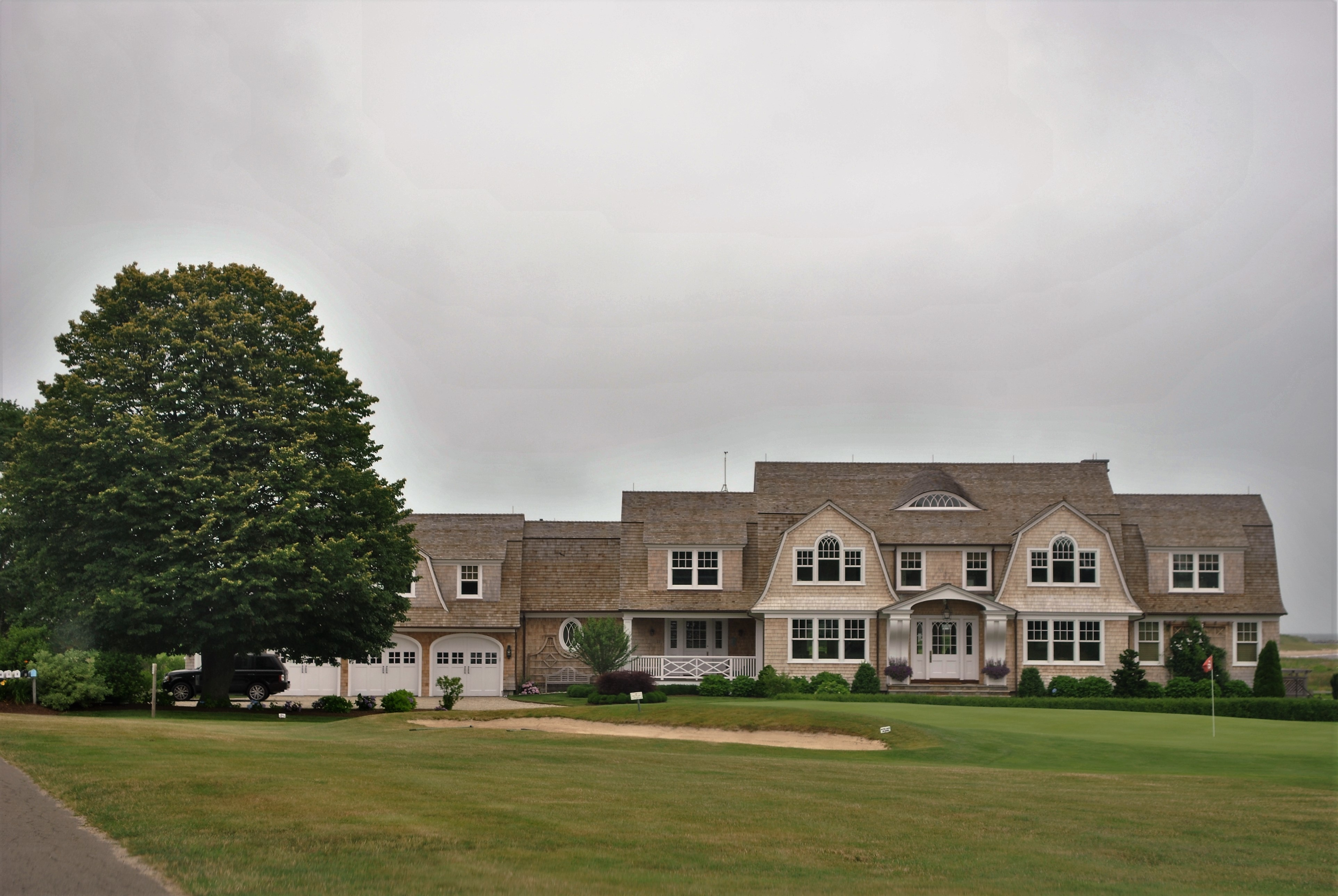

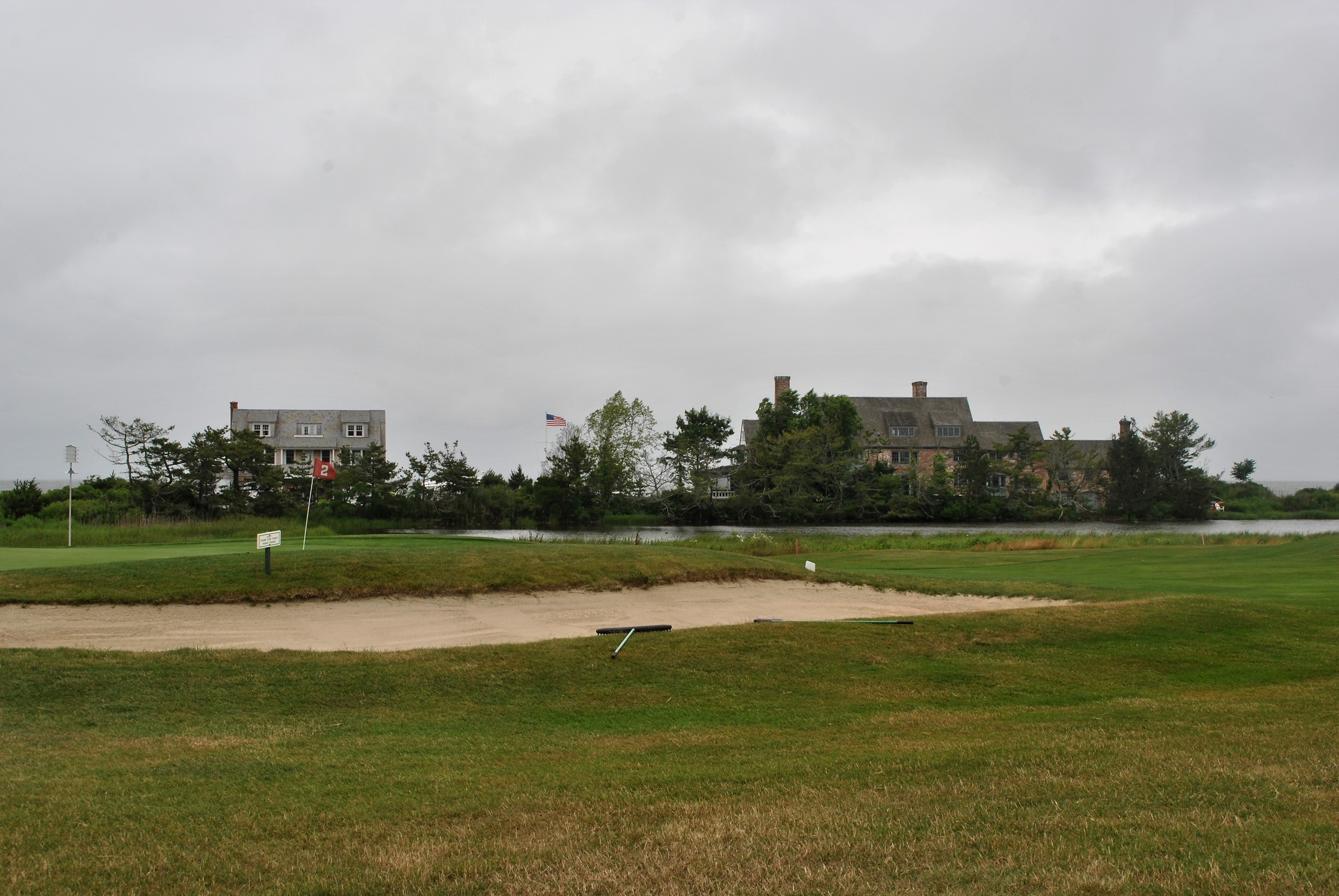
Katharine Hepburn House (on the right)

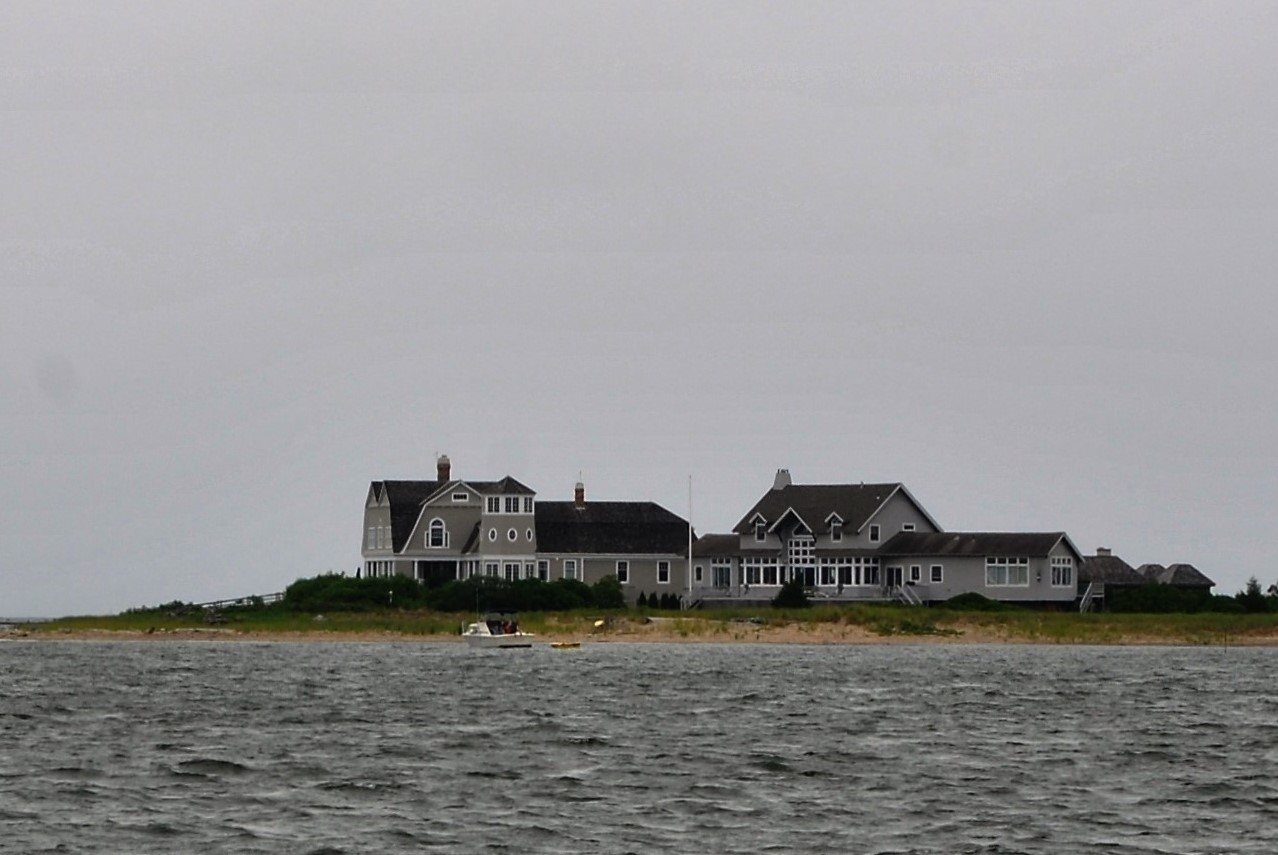

== See also ==
- National Register of Historic Places listings in Middlesex County, Connecticut
