= Lynde Point Light =

Lighthouse in Connecticut, United States

Lynde Point Light Saybrook Inner
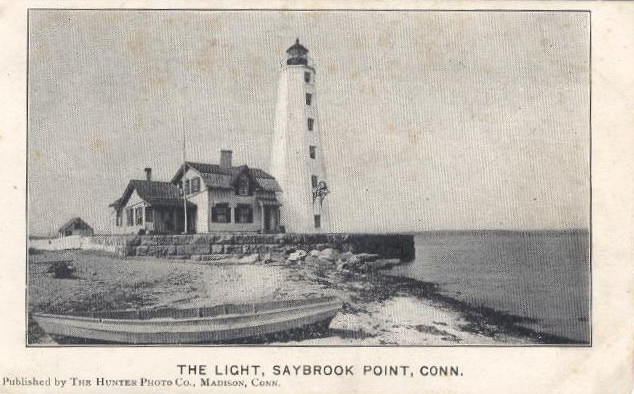
- The lighthouse as it appeared about 1905
- Location: Old Saybrook, Connecticut, United States
- Coordinates: 41°16′17″N 72°20′36″W

Tower
- Foundation: granite pier
- Construction: brownstone (tower)
- Automated: 1975
- Height: 65 ft (20 m)
- Shape: octagonal tower with balcony and lantern
- Operator: United States Coast Guard
- Heritage: National Register of Historic Places listed place

Light
- First lit: 1839
- Focal height: 71 ft (22 m)
- Lens: 10 lamps, 9 inch reflectors (removed 1852), Fifth order Fresnel lens (1890)
- Range: 14 nmi (26 km; 16 mi)
- Characteristic: F W
- Original light
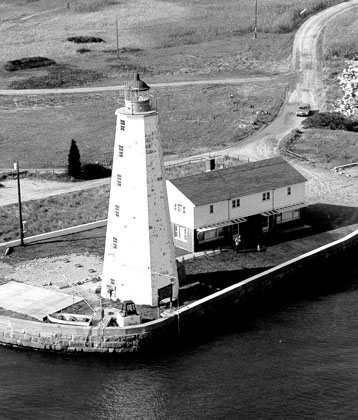
- Constructed: 1803
- Construction: wood
- Height: 35 ft (11 m)
- Lynde Point Light
- U.S. National Register of Historic Places
- Nearest city: Old Saybrook, Connecticut
- MPS: Operating Lighthouses in Connecticut MPS
- NRHP reference No.: 89001469
- Added to NRHP: May 29, 1990

The Lynde Point Light or Lynde Point Lighthouse, also known as Saybrook Inner Lighthouse, is a lighthouse in Connecticut, United States, on the west side of the mouth of the Connecticut River on the Long Island Sound, Old Saybrook, Connecticut. The first light was a 35 feet (11 m) wooden tower constructed by Abisha Woodward for $2,200 and it was completed in 1803. A new lighthouse was eventually needed and a total of $7,500 was appropriated on July 7, 1838. Jonathan Scranton, Volney Pierce, and John Wilcox were contracted to build the new 65-foot (20 m) octagonal brownstone tower. It was constructed in 1838 and lit in 1839. The lighthouse was renovated in 1867 and had its keeper's house from 1833 replaced in 1858 with a Gothic Revival gambrel-roofed wood-frame house. In 1966, the house was torn down and replaced by a duplex house. The original ten lamps were replaced in 1852 with a fourth-order Fresnel lens, and with a fifth-order Fresnel lens in 1890. Lynde Point Lighthouse used whale oil until 1879 when it switched to kerosene. It was electrified in 1955 and fully automated by the United States Coast Guard in 1978. In 1990, it was added to the National Register of Historic Places and is significant for its "superior stone work in the tapering brownstone walls".

== First light ==
Out of a need for a lighthouse to mark the Old Saybrook harbor, the government paid $225 for William Lynde's land at its entrance to erect a light. Abisha Woodward was contracted to build a 35 feet (11 m) wooden tower for $2,200 and it was completed in 1803. Due to erosion threatening the foundation of the lighthouse, a seawall was constructed in 1829, and it was reinforced and widened in 1831. Also constructed was a six-room frame structure to serve as the keeper's quarters. The keeper's building was replaced in 1933. The light was criticized by many sailors for being too short to be seen at an effective distance, a problem exacerbated by a local fog from the marshland that obscured the light. A petition was made to have the tower raised 25 feet (7.6 m), but it was deemed a replacement would be better.

== Current light ==
The United States Congress appropriated funds for the tower's replacement by 1832. On July 7, 1838, Congress appropriated an additional $2,500.00 to add to the other $5,000.00 appropriated for the new lighthouse. The contract for the lighthouse was awarded to Jonathan Scranton, Volney Pierce, and John Wilcox of Madison, Connecticut, on August 18, 1838. A new 65-foot (20 m) octagonal brownstone tower was constructed in 1838 and lit in 1839. The walls of the base of the light are 5 feet (1.5 m) thick, tapering to 2 feet (0.61 m) at the top. The lighthouse is painted white and has six windows, all facing the water. The lighthouse has been described as being "similar to the masonry towers built earlier, (New London Harbor Light, New Haven Harbor (Five Mile Point) Light, and Faulkner's Island Light), but Lynde Point is considered to represent the finest work of the three". The wooden staircase was likely replaced in an 1868 renovation of the light. In 1886, the Saybrook Breakwater Light was built. Lynde Point then became commonly known as the "Saybrook Inner Light" and Saybrook Breakwater became known as the "Saybrook Outer Light".

The keeper's house from 1833 had a frame kitchen addition that connected to the lighthouse, but it was replaced in 1858 with a Gothic Revival gambrel-roofed wood-frame house. In 1966, the house was torn down and replaced by a duplex house. In 1852, a fourth-order Fresnel lens from Barbler and Fenestre replaced the original ten lamps and 9-inch (230 mm) reflectors. In 1890, a fifth-order Fresnel lens, which is still in the tower today, was installed. An appropriation of $800 was made for a fog bell in 1850, and it was installed in 1854 at a cost of $1000. Two years later the machinery to automatically strike the fog bell was completed. The 1867 renovation saw the addition of a fog siren, but it was removed and replaced with the fog bell in 1874 and a new fog bell was later installed in 1883. Lynde Point Lighthouse used whale oil until 1879 when it switched to kerosene, it was electrified in 1955 and fully automated by the United States Coast Guard in 1978.

== Importance ==
In 1990, it was added to the National Register of Historic Places. Templeton writes, "Lynde Point exhibits superior stone work in the tapering brownstone walls. Of the three early masonry Lighttowers in the nominated group, Lynde Point is the latest and its construction is the best documented: two advertisements for construction proposals survive, containing the government's specifications, and the construction contract as well. Lynde Point also is significant as part of the federal government's early efforts to improve aids to navigation in Long Island Sound, when the mouths of important harbors and rivers were among the first sites chosen for lighthouse appropriations." Lynde Point is an active aid to navigation and is not open to the public. The Lynde Point Light was used in the 2005 horror movie Predator Island.

== List of keepers ==
This list includes known keepers, but excludes assistants and non-officers of the Coast Guard.

Name	Year	Reference	Service Notes
Cranie	Unknown		Unknown name.
Daniel Whittlesey	Unknown-1841		
Catherine S. Whittlesey	1841-c. 1850		
Henry Clark	circa 1850		Also written Clarke
James Rankin	1853–1861		
A. H. Bushnell	1861–1867		
Jared Daniels	1867–1869		
Richard Ingham	1869–1883		
John Ninde Buckridge	1883–1902		
Samuel Wright	1902		
Elmer Gildersleeve	1902–1925		
Arthur J. Baldwin	circa 1925–1930		

== See also ==
- List of lighthouses in Connecticut
- List of lighthouses in the United States
- National Register of Historic Places listings in Middlesex County, Connecticut
