= Avery Point Light =

Lighthouse in Connecticut

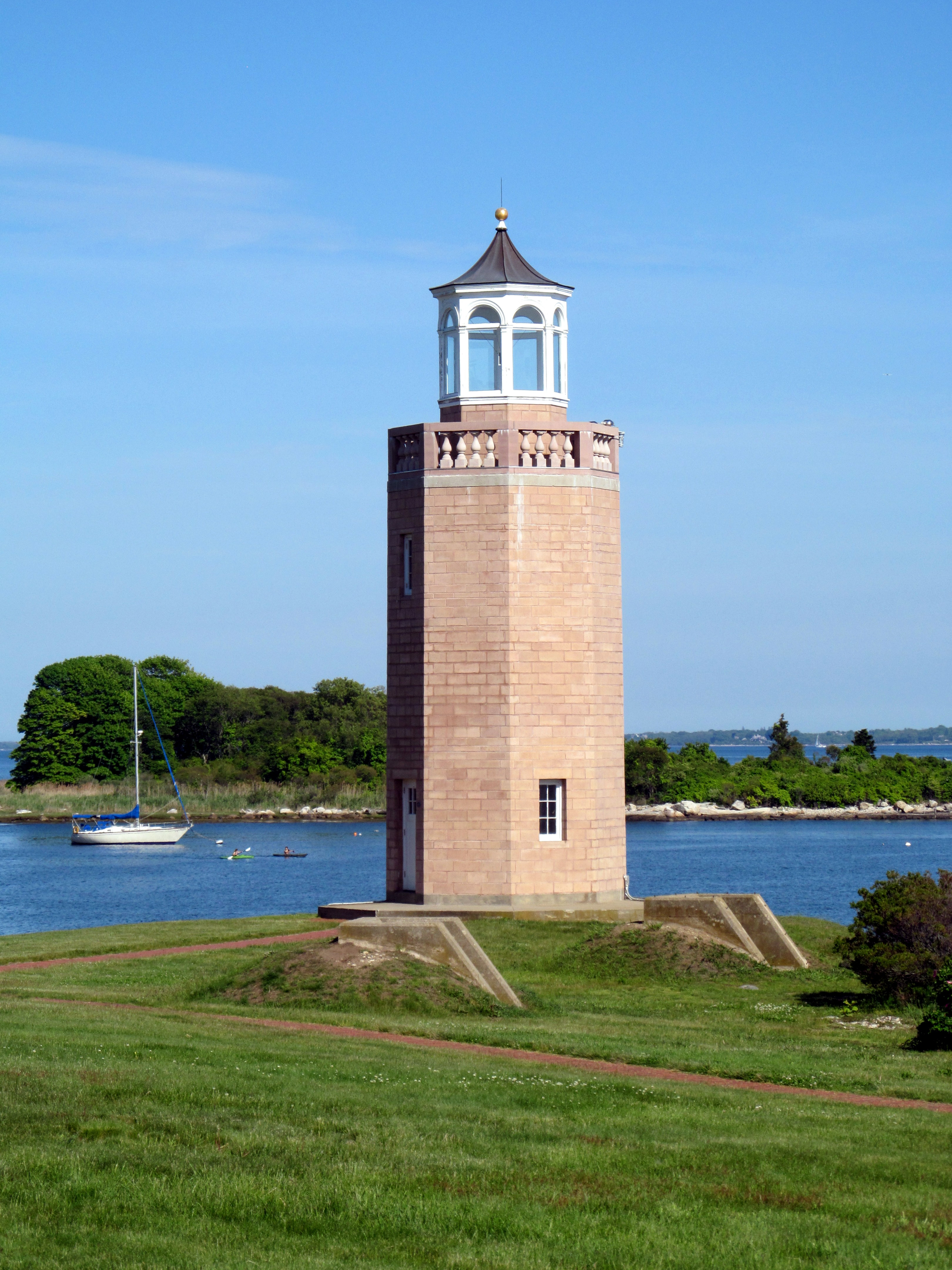
- Post-renovations view in 2014
- Location: Groton, United States
- Coordinates: 41°18′54″N 72°03′50″W

Tower
- Constructed: 1943
- Construction: concrete
- Height: 55 ft (17 m)
- Shape: octagonal tower with balcony and lantern
- Markings: Unpainted (tower), white (lantern), black (roof)
- Power source: solar power
- Operator: Avery Point Lighthouse Society
- Heritage: National Register of Historic Places listed place

Light
- First lit: 1944, 2006
- Deactivated: 1967–2006 (reactivated)
- Focal height: 56 ft (17 m)
- Lens: LED
- Range: 3.5 nmi (6.5 km; 4.0 mi)
- Characteristic: Fl G 4s
- Avery Point Lighthouse
- U.S. National Register of Historic Places
- Location: On Long Island Sound at 1084 Shennecossett Road, Groton, Connecticut
- Coordinates: 41°18′54.8″N 72°3′49″W
- Area: less than one acre
- Built: 1943
- Architectural style: Colonial Revival
- NRHP reference No.: 02000866
- Added to NRHP: August 23, 2002

Avery Point Light or Avery Point Lighthouse is located in Groton, Connecticut, on the Avery Point Campus of the University of Connecticut. The lighthouse was built in March 1943, but it was not illuminated until May 1944 due to concerns of possible enemy invasion during World War 2. Its original light consisted of eight 200-watt bulbs that were replaced by a flashing green light in 1960. It was deactivated on June 25, 1967, when the United States Coast Guard Training Station moved to Governors Island. It is officially listed as the last lighthouse built in the state; the only other claimant is the replica Mystic Seaport Light.

The lighthouse deteriorated until the University of Connecticut declared it to be a hazard in 1997. A restoration effort was launched in 1999 through the American Lighthouse Foundation (ALF) and the Avery Point Lighthouse Society. The restoration of the lighthouse began in 2001 and was completed in 2006, requiring a replica lantern, extensive structural repairs, and replacement of crumbling blocks. Bills were appropriated for $150,000 and $100,000 and used to complete the restoration. The relighting and re-dedication of the lighthouse was held on October 15, 2006. It was listed on the National Register of Historic Places in 2002.

== Construction ==
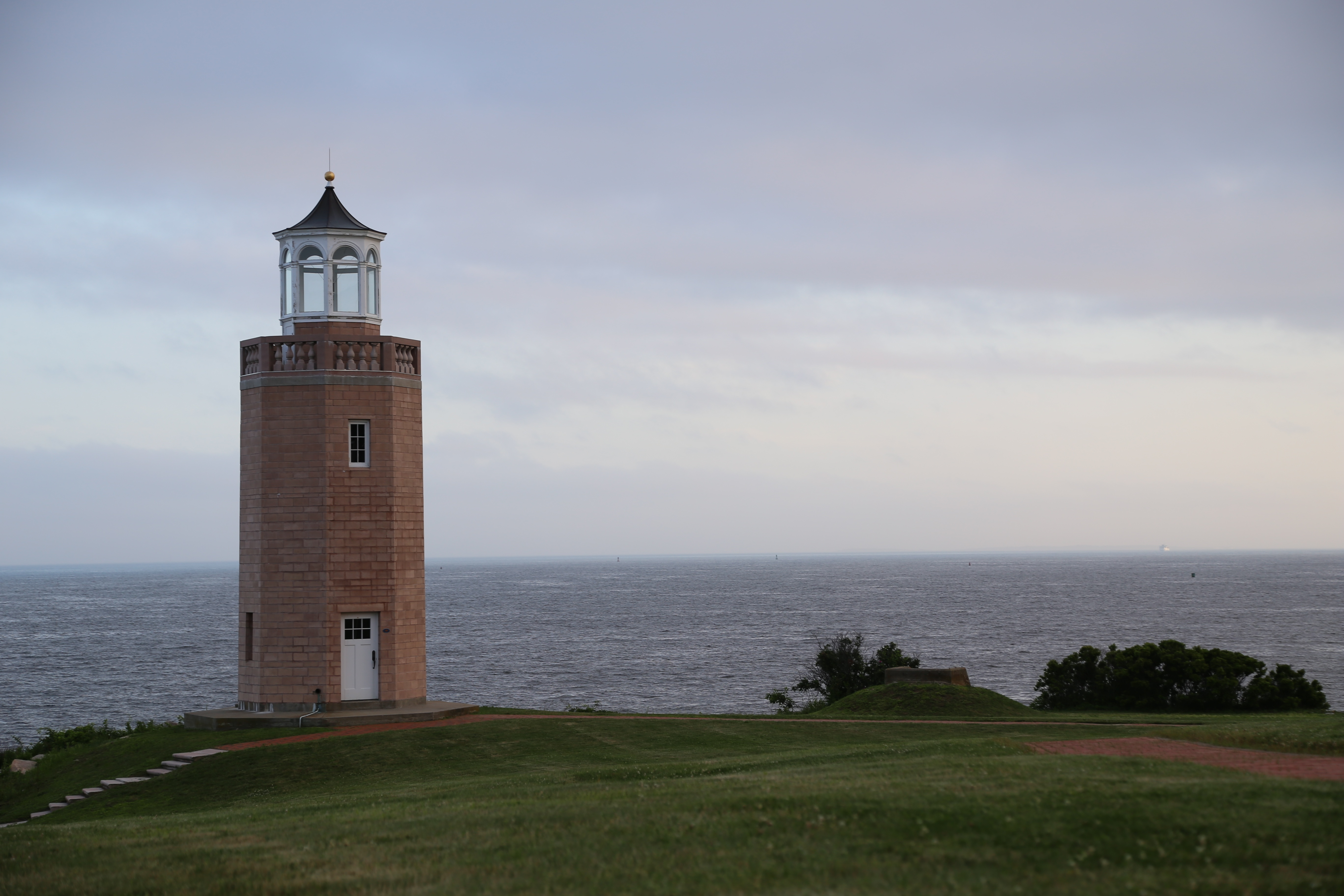
Avery Point Light overlooks Fisher's Island Sound from the bluffs at Avery Point

The land at Avery Point was owned by Morton F. Plant owned the land at Avery Point on which the lighthouse was constructed. His Branford House mansion is located several hundred feet away from the lighthouse. Plant's estate was sold to the state of Connecticut 24 years after he died, and it was later transferred to the U.S. Coast Guard. The Coast Guard's deed required the construction and maintenance of beacon lights or other navigational aids as part of the Coast Guard's new training facility. The Avery Point Light was named for Captain James Avery of New London, Connecticut.

The Avery Point Light was designed by Alfred Hopkins and Associates to be a 41-foot (12 m) octagonal tower, and was completed in March 1943. It is built of brown concrete blocks and topped with an octagonal wooden lantern. During the restoration effort, it was discovered that six different types of concrete blocks were used in the construction.

The tower has a total of five windows, with two facing south and one each to the north, east, and west. The lantern gallery deck is constructed of concrete and lined with 32 Italian marble balusters, imported from Italy around 1900. The interior has an iron ladder that leads up to the watchroom level. The lighthouse design and masonry tower have Colonial Revival elements. It is the last lighthouse built in the state of Connecticut as an official navigational aid.

== Service ==
The Avery Point Light was not lighted until May 2, 1944, due to concerns about possible enemy invasions by sea. D'Entremont notes that the first light, consisting of eight 200-watt bulbs, were an unusual array that created a fixed white light source. Though it never had a formal keeper, the lighthouse was tended by personnel or students from the United States Coast Guard Training Station. In 1960, the light was changed to flashing green and the candlepower rating doubled from 100 to 200. The light was deactivated on June 25, 1967, when the training facility moved from Avery Point to Governors Island.

== Restoration ==
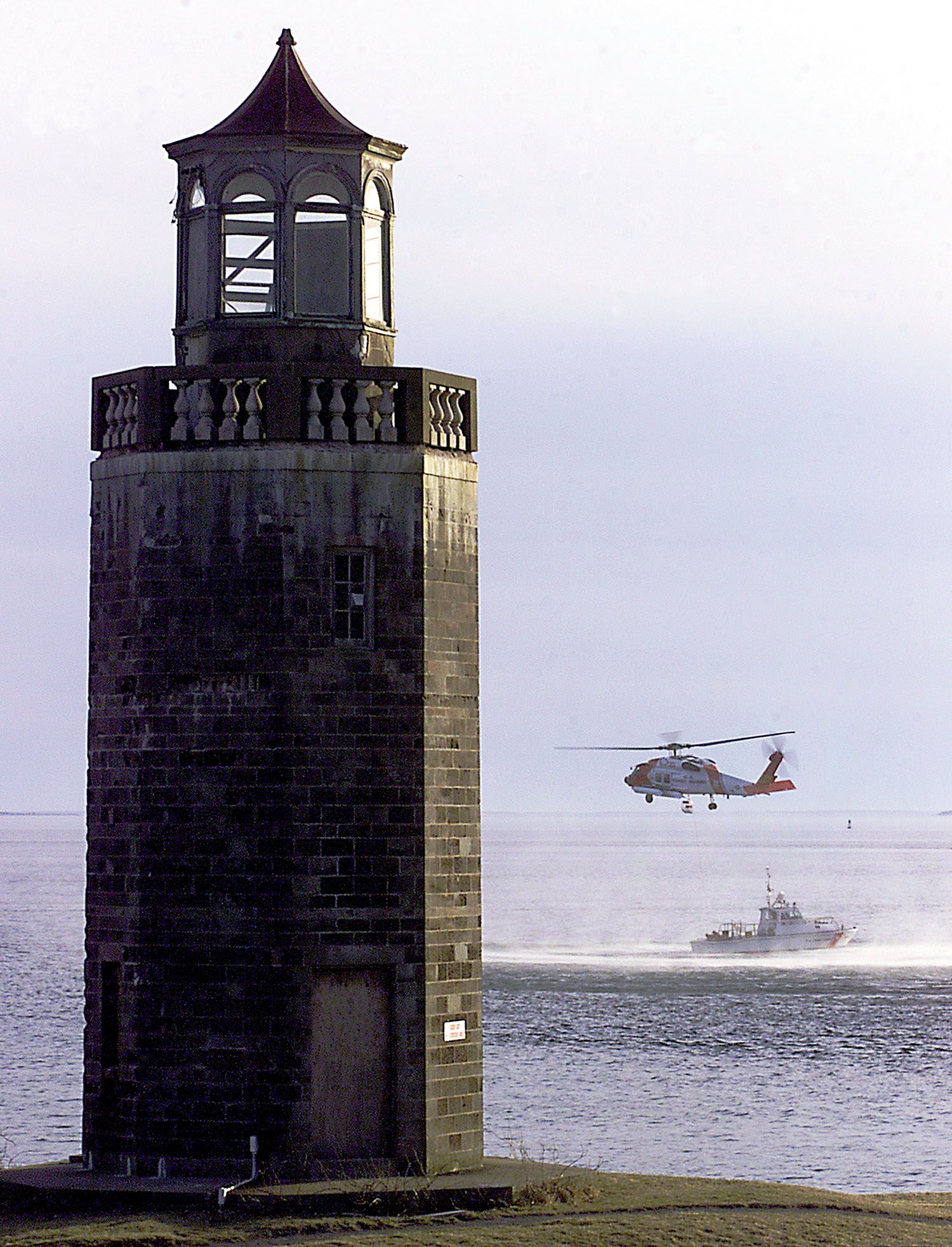
In 2000, prior to restoration.

The University of Connecticut listed Avery Point Light as being in "dangerously poor condition" by July 1997 and declared it a safety hazard. In December 2007, Lighthouse Digest included a brief article with the title "Avery Point added to Doomsday List" after rumors were reported of it being torn down. The article included two images showing the blocked-off lighthouse with its crumbling bricks and a sign reading "Keep Out Hazardous Area". In 1999, the American Lighthouse Foundation (ALF) and the Avery Point Lighthouse Society (APLS) began fund-raising to save and restore the lighthouse.

In 2000, the APLS website estimated that $25,000 would be needed for the initial engineering study and $150,000 to $200,000 to complete the restoration. In 2001, a bill aiming to raise $150,000 in bonds to fund the restoration was introduced by Connecticut State Senator Catherine Cook. which was later approved. The New London Day noted that James Nordon's engineering firm of Gibble, Norden and Champion was providing an engineering study valued at $40,000 at no cost.

On December 1, 2001, the first part of the restoration began with the removal of the lantern. Due to the deterioration of the lantern, the decision was made to make a replica of the original lantern. From 2003 through 2004, the West Mystic Wooden Boat Building Company donated the materials and labor to construct the replica. The company's owner Steve Jones has close ties to the Avery Point Light, as he is a former lighthouse keeper for the Harbor of Refuge Light in Lewes, Delaware and was also a University of Connecticut professor at the time.

The concrete blocks used in the lighthouse's construction were of poor quality due to the high sand content that crumbled with the expanding and contracting of the mortar. The decision was made to replace the outer face of the concrete blocks and to strengthen the remaining original blocks with cement and steel reinforcements. A total of 3,000 blocks were needed to complete the restoration and had to be produced using special molds. The restoration work on the tower began in September 2003. Increasing costs of the restoration resulted in a need for more funding to complete the project. In 2003, the National Park Service's "Save America’s Treasures Act" provided funding for another $100,000. Delays in the appropriation of funding delayed the second phase of the structural restoration until June 2005; the work was conducted from July through early November. The relighting and re-dedication of the lighthouse was held on October 15, 2006.

== Importance ==
The lighthouse has been described as a memorial tower in various sources, when in fact it was constructed as a working navigational aid. Jeremy D'Entremont writes in the 1994 America's Atlantic Coast Lighthouses: A Traveler's Guide: "the tower was built as a memorial tower and as a symbolic representation of the USCG lighthouse keeping responsibilities." He notes that the misunderstanding stems from an article from 1955 in U.S. Coast Guard Magazine and acknowledges that it has come to serve as a memorial. The lighthouse was added to the National Register of Historic Places in 2002.

== See also ==
- List of lighthouses in the United States
- List of lighthouses in Connecticut
- National Register of Historic Places listings in New London County, Connecticut
