= Stamford Harbor Ledge Light =

Lighthouse in Connecticut, United States

Stamford Harbor Ledge Light Chatham Rocks
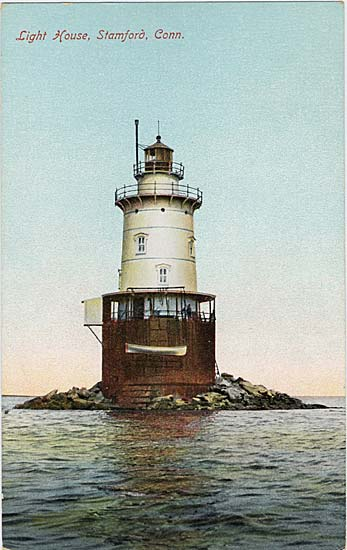
- Postcard dated 1912
- Location: Stamford; Connecticut; United States
- Coordinates: 41°00′49.2″N 73°32′33.32″W

Tower
- Constructed: 1882
- Foundation: cast iron and concrete caisson
- Construction: sparkplug lighthouse
- Automated: 1953
- Height: 60 ft (18 m)
- Shape: cylindrical tower with double balcony and lantern incorporating keeper's quarter
- Power source: solar power
- Operator: private
- Heritage: National Register of Historic Places listed place

Light
- Deactivated: 1953-1985
- Focal height: 80 ft (24 m)
- Lens: Fourth order Fresnel lens (original), 7.9 inches (200 mm) (current)
- Characteristic: Fl W 4s.
- Stamford Harbor Lighthouse
- U.S. National Register of Historic Places
- Area: 0.5 acres (0.20 ha)
- Built: 1882
- Architect: United States Lighthouse Board
- Architectural style: Conical tower on caisson
- NRHP reference No.: 91000348
- Added to NRHP: April 3, 1991

Stamford Harbor Ledge Lighthouse is a lighthouse in Connecticut, United States, on Chatham Rock off of Stamford, Connecticut. It was added to the National Register of Historic Places in 1991.

The interior of the structure has seven levels. The upper balcony boasts sweeping views of the Stamford and Manhattan skylines, as well as Long Island Sound and Stamford Harbor. The lighthouse is accessed by a floating dock.

== History ==
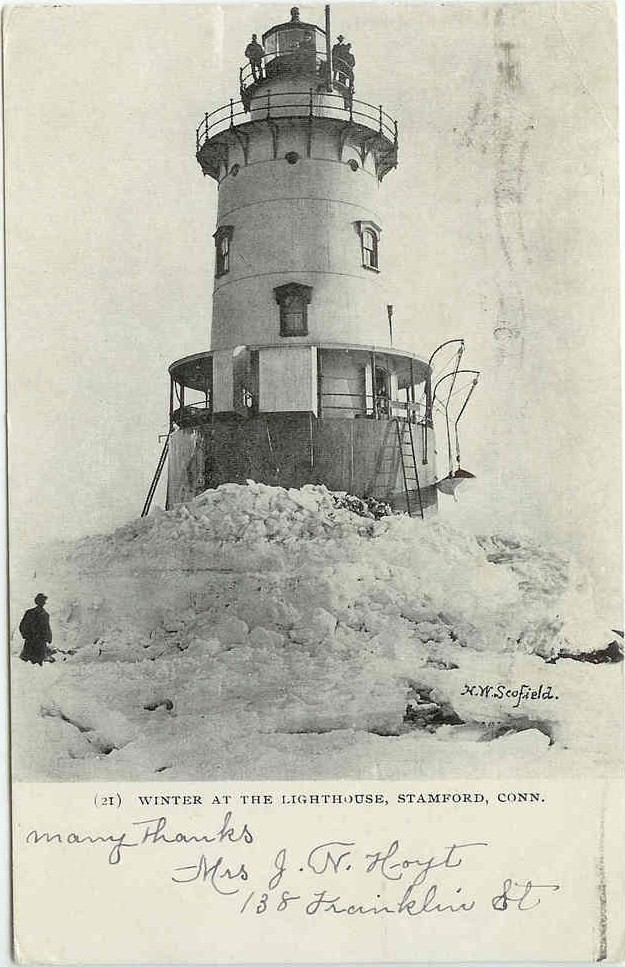
Winter scene, from a postcard mailed in 1906

The Stamford Harbor Ledge lighthouse was built in 1882 and was a sparkplug lighthouse cast iron tower, manufactured in Boston. The light, 3,600 feet (1,100 m) from shore, was sold to a private party in 1955.

Several lighthouse keepers and their families lived in the lighthouse at various times.

In 2008, the property was put up for sale, with an asking price of $1.75 million as of September 25, 2008. By June 2009, the asking price had fallen to $1.595 million, according to the real estate agent's website. According to an advertisement for the real estate offering, the property includes the lighthouse, Chatham Rock and, in words that were in quotes in the advertisement, "surrounding underwater land embraced within a circle, seven hundred fifty (750) feet in diameter, the center of which is Chatham Rock".

== Head keepers ==
- Neil Martin (1882)
- Nahor Jones (1882 – 1886)
- Samuel C. Gardiner (1886)
- John Ryle (1886 – 1887)
- Samuel A. Keeney (1887 – 1903)
- Maurice Russell (1903 – 1904)
- Adolph Obman (1904 – 1907)
- John J. Cook (1907 – 1909)
- William Janse (1909)
- Adolph Obman (1909 – 1911)
- Robert R. Laurier (1911 – 1912)
- John H. Paul (1912)
- Joseph Meyer (at least 1913)
- Charles R. Riley (at least 1915 – at least 1916)
- Edward Grime (1917 – 1919)
- George Washington Denton Jr. (1919)
- Edward Murphy (1919 – 1920)
- Edward Iten (at least 1921 – at least 1927)
- Edward M. Whitford (at least 1929)
- Robert M. Fitton (at least 1930)
- Raymond F. Bliven (1930 – 1931)
- Martin Luther Sowle (1938 – 1953)

== See also ==
- List of lighthouses in Connecticut
- List of lighthouses in the United States
- National Register of Historic Places listings in Stamford, Connecticut
