= Lordship, Connecticut =

Census-designated place in Connecticut, United States

Coordinates: 41°09′14″N 73°06′43″W

- Census-designated place
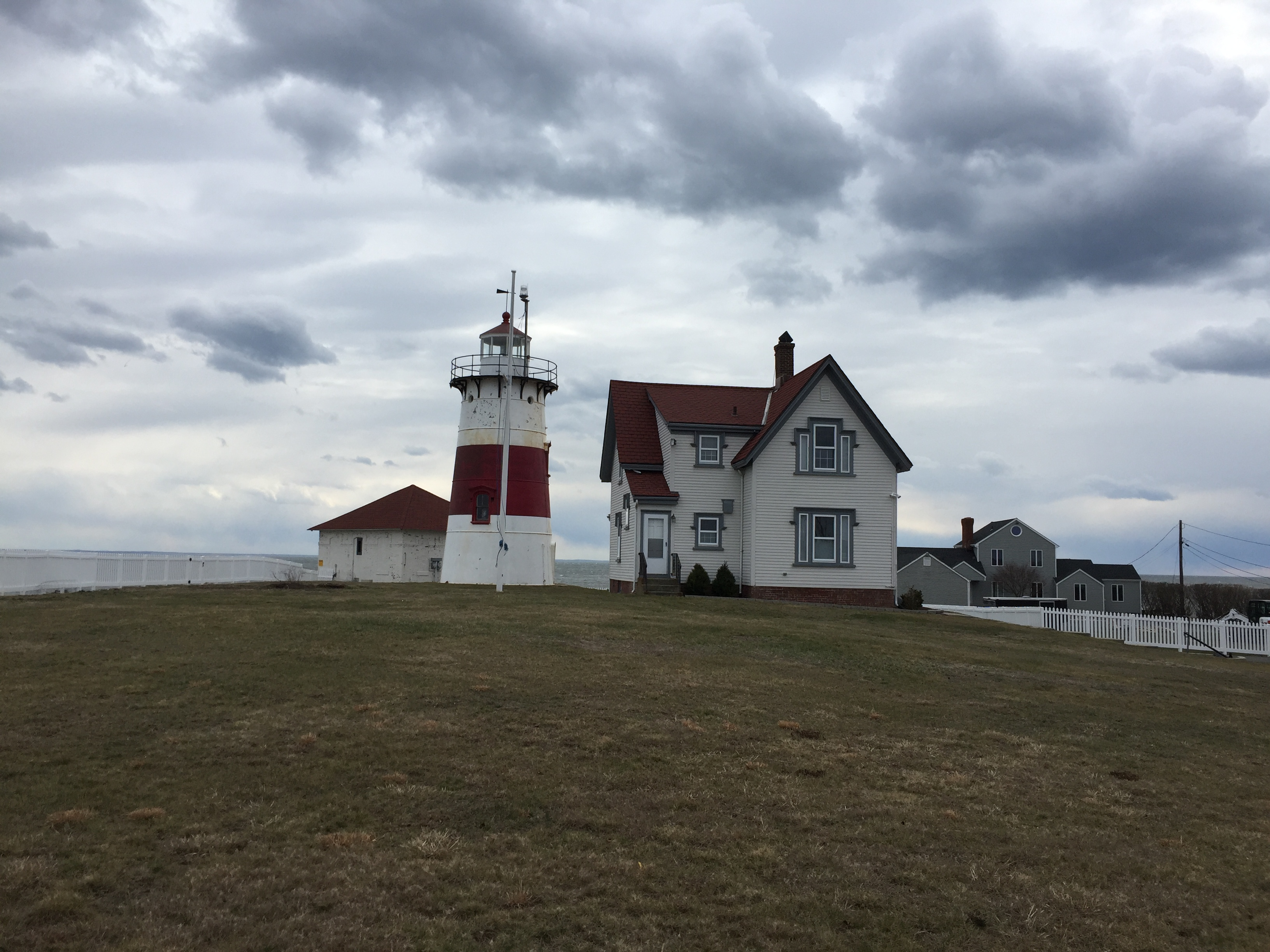
- Stratford Point Lighthouse in 2016

- Map of Greater Bridgeport showing Lordship
- Country: United States
- State: Connecticut
- County: Fairfield
- Town: Stratford
- Time zone: UTC-5:00 (Eastern)
  - Summer (DST): UTC-4:00 (Eastern)
- Area code: 203

Lordship is a small, waterfront neighborhood situated on Connecticut's Gold Coast in Stratford, Connecticut, United States. As of the 2020 census, Lordship had a population of 2,954. It was listed as a census-designated place prior to the 2020 census. Lordship was an island bounded by salt marshes to the north and Long Island Sound to the south, The neighborhood currently extends, by man made fill, as a peninsula on Long Island Sound and is bounded from the rest of Stratford by Sikorsky Memorial Airport to the north and Short Beach to the north east. Lordship is accessible by only two roads, both parts of Route 113.

Lordship is home to the Stratford Point Light.

== History ==
The first inhabitants of Lordship were the Paugussetts who had a large village at Frash Pond and smaller encampments at Stratford Point and at Indian Well (areas in Lordship). Indian Well was a fresh water pond where the old trolley line crossed Duck Neck Creek just north of the rotary near the firehouse. When the first settlers arrived in 1639, they found that Indians were using this area to plant corn, so there was little clearing necessary. Lordship, originally called Great Neck, was a “Common Field” worked and owned by settlers who returned home to the safety of the palisade fort at Academy Hill at night. Richard Mills was the first to build a farmhouse in Great Neck in the western end near present-day Second Avenue. He sold his estate to Joseph Hawley (Captain) in 1650 and moved. It is in connection with his name that the term Lordship is first found, as applied to a meadow on what is still known as the Lordship farm. It is said in deeds of land - 1650 to 1660 – several times, Mill’s Lordship and the Lordship Meadow. Richard Beach came to Stratford with a family and in 1662, he purchased one of five acres on west point of the Neck, butted south upon the meadow called Mill’s Lordship.

Gustave Whitehead is reported to have used the windswept sandy areas of Lordship during some of his early powered flight trials in the early 1900s.

== Demographics ==
=== 2020 census ===
As of the 2020 census, Lordship had a population of 2,954. The median age was 53.4 years. 14.2% of residents were under the age of 18 and 25.6% of residents were 65 years of age or older. For every 100 females there were 92.7 males, and for every 100 females age 18 and over there were 90.4 males age 18 and over.

100.0% of residents lived in urban areas, while 0.0% lived in rural areas.

There were 1,310 households in Lordship, of which 18.2% had children under the age of 18 living in them. Of all households, 48.3% were married-couple households, 16.6% were households with a male householder and no spouse or partner present, and 27.8% were households with a female householder and no spouse or partner present. About 32.0% of all households were made up of individuals and 16.7% had someone living alone who was 65 years of age or older.

There were 1,462 housing units, of which 10.4% were vacant. The homeowner vacancy rate was 2.0% and the rental vacancy rate was 3.5%.

Racial composition as of the 2020 census
Race	Number	Percent
White	2,612	88.4%
Black or African American	75	2.5%
American Indian and Alaska Native	1	0.0%
Asian	40	1.4%
Native Hawaiian and Other Pacific Islander	0	0.0%
Some other race	69	2.3%
Two or more races	157	5.3%
Hispanic or Latino (of any race)	169	5.7%
