= Falkner Island Light =

Lighthouse in Connecticut, United States

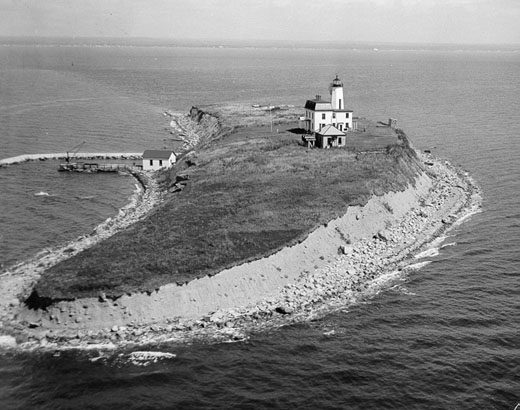
- View of Falkner Island and Light
- Location: New Haven County, United States
- Coordinates: 41°12′43″N 72°39′13″W

Tower
- Constructed: 1802
- Construction: fieldstone (basement), brownstone (tower), brick (lining)
- Automated: 1978
- Height: 46 ft (14 m)
- Shape: octagonal tower with balcony and lantern
- Markings: White (tower), red (lantern)
- Power source: solar power
- Operator: Stewart B. McKinney National Wildlife Refuge and Faulkner's Light Brigade
- Heritage: National Register of Historic Places listed place

Light
- Focal height: 94 ft (29 m)
- Light source: 9 lamps, 16" reflectors (1840), VLB-44 (current)
- Range: 13 nmi (24 km; 15 mi)
- Characteristic: Fl W 10s
- Falkner Island Light
- U.S. National Register of Historic Places
- Location: Long Island Sound, 5 miles south of Guilford, Connecticut
- Area: 4.9 acres (2.0 ha)
- Built: 1802
- Architect: Abisha Woodward
- NRHP reference No.: 89001467
- Added to NRHP: May 24, 1990

Falkner Island Light, also known as the Faulkner Island Lighthouse, is a lighthouse in Connecticut, United States, on Falkner Island which is off Guilford Harbor on Long Island Sound. The lighthouse was constructed in 1802 and commissioned by President Thomas Jefferson. The lighthouse has had three keeper's houses: the original house of 1802 was rebuilt in 1851 and then again in 1871. The 1871 keeper's house survived to 1976, when it was destroyed by fire; the Coast Guard repaired and automated the lighthouse two years later. A volunteer group, the Faulkner's Light Brigade, has undertaken the restoration and preservation of the lighthouse since 1991, completing the last major restoration work in March 2011. Access to Falkner Island and the light is restricted during the nesting season of the roseate terns from May to August yearly. The Falkner Island Lighthouse, as the second oldest extant lighthouse in Connecticut, is listed on the National Register of Historic Places.

== Falkner Island ==
Falkner Island is a crescent-shaped island located three and a half miles offshore of Guilford, Connecticut. The island has had several owners including Andrew Leete in the 1600s. In 1715, Caleb and Ebenezer Stone purchased the island, which remained in the Stone family until 1801. In 1800, Noah Stone sold it to a distant relative, Medad Stone, for $158.34. On May 12, 1801, Medad Stone sold the island to the government for $325. Joel Henderson, a historian, notes that Medad Stone and the government were likely openly communicating about the island. The United States Congress had appropriated $6000 in March 1801 for the lighthouse, prior to the government's acquisition of the property.

== Construction ==
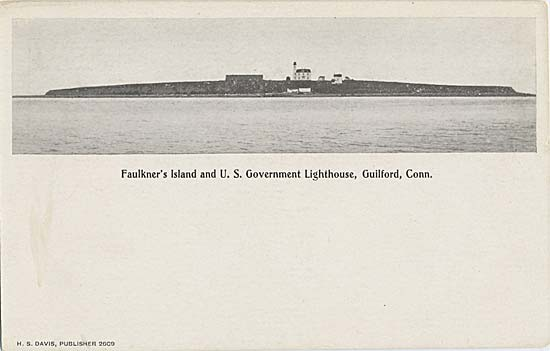
1904 postcard

The Falkner Island Lighthouse was commissioned by President Thomas Jefferson in 1802. It was constructed and completed by Abisha Woodward in 1802. Woodward also built New London Harbor Light in 1801 and the Black Rock Harbor Light in 1808. Falkner Island Lighthouse cost $5977.62 to build, according to the United States government. The 46 ft (14 m) octagonal tower was made of brownstone lined with brick, and it originally had a spiral wooden staircase that led outside to the lantern room. This staircase was an unusual and distinguishing characteristic of the Falkner Island Light. The original fixed light used twelve lamps and reflectors on two stacked tables. It was replaced in 1840, at a cost of $2842.00, with a lantern that used nine lamps and sixteen-inch reflectors. A 33 ft (10 m) cast iron spiral staircase was installed in a major renovation in 1871.

Originally, the keeper's house had eight rooms, but it deteriorated and was rebuilt in 1858. When rebuilt it was one-and-a-half stories high and had three bedrooms, a kitchen, dining and sitting rooms. Construction quality was poor, allowing snow to enter the house during the winter through gaps in the walls and roof. In 1871, it was rebuilt by the United States Coast Guard as a three-story house, which remained until it was destroyed by fire on March 15, 1976. The fire also scorched the adjacent lighthouse. In the Spring 2002 edition of The Octagon, the keeper's house was said to be a two-story house with eleven rooms.

== Service ==
During the War of 1812, the British forces landed on the island and told the keeper's wife, Thankful Stone, that they had nothing to fear as long as they kept the light burning. Later, the keeper, Solomon Stone, had to put the light out per order of the New London customs inspector. The British threatened to blow up the lighthouse, and Stone got an order to relight the lighthouse. In 1856, the light was upgraded from the twelve lamps to a fourth-order Fresnel lens. The light's new characteristic was a fixed light with a flash every two seconds. Around 1976, a GE 1000-watt bulb was used. When the lighthouse was repaired after the fire and automated in 1978, a modern optic replaced the Fresnel lens. The lighthouse currently uses a VRB-25 lens. The lighthouse switched to solar power in 1988. The light's characteristic is a flash of white light every ten seconds. It continues to operate as a navigational aid to the nearby Intracoastal Waterway.

Falkner Island Light was chosen for fog-signal experiments in 1865 and in 1902. In 1865, Joseph Henry of the Smithsonian Institution, the Chairman of the Lighthouse Board, set up bells and whistles and tested the distances they could be heard. In 1879, a steam fog whistle was installed at the cost of $5000. In 1902, an air siren was installed and powered by two 16½ horsepower engines and used in an experiment in sound penetration. In 1934, a Leslie-Tyfon trumpet was installed.

== Restoration ==
After the fire in 1976, vandals caused additional damage that resulted in the windows being bricked up and a steel door installed. Restoration and preservation of the light is done through the volunteer "Faulkner's Light Brigade", which formed in 1991. In 1997, Walter Sedovic was selected by a Lighthouse Restoration Committee to perform the restoration of the lighthouse. Completed in 1999, the restorations included painting the interior and exterior, replacing the door and a new entry deck made of Pau Lope wood.

The lighthouse has been threatened by erosion for decades. In the 1930s, as a response to the erosion, a breakwater was constructed to protect the boat landing area. In 1996, the Connecticut Trust for Historic Preservation and the National Trust for Historic Preservation assisted the task of obtaining funding for a $4.5 million erosion-control project. The funds were approved in 1998 with the help of Connecticut Senators, Joseph Lieberman and Christopher Dodd and New Haven's Congressional Representative Rosa DeLauro. In 2001, the construction of a stone wall and creation of a buffer zone was completed. The second phase of the project calls for protective revetment on the south side of the island.

The 33-foot cast iron spiral staircase from 1871 was repaired and restored for the cost of $15,724. The work was done by Conservation Services and they uncovered and preserved the numbering of the stairs. In October 2010, a major restoration project repainted the tower and lantern, installed ventilated steel doors, restored the original weathervane and repaired the 12-pane casement window on the west wall of the lighthouse. The work was completed in March 2011 after it was suspended due to poor weather in December 2010; the total cost was $121,000.

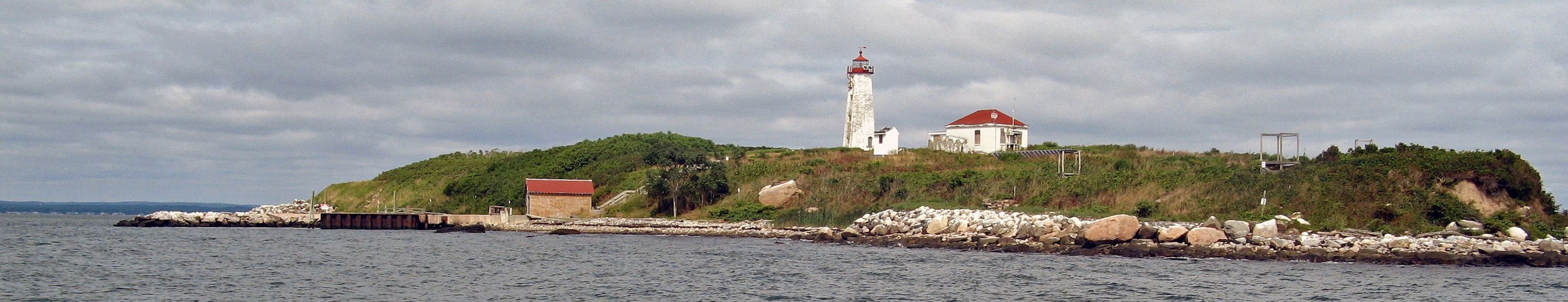
Falkner Island Light, 2010

== Importance ==
Falkner Island Light is the second oldest extant lighthouse in Connecticut and was listed on the National Register of Historic Places on May 29, 1990. The Town of Guilford proclaimed that September 7, 2002, would be "Faulkner's Island Light Day" to honor the 200th birthday of the lighthouse. Falkner Island Light is home to one of the world's largest breeding colonies of the endangered roseate tern; the nesting season is May through August. Access to Falkner Island and the light is restricted during the nesting season of the roseate terns.

== See also ==
- List of lighthouses in the United States
- List of lighthouses in Connecticut
- National Register of Historic Places listings in New Haven County, Connecticut
- Falkner Island

== Notes ==
- Lighthouse Friends lists the tower as being 40 ft (12 m) tall. While this is accurate by one measurement the tower is defined in publications as being 46 ft (14 m) tall.
