= List of lighthouses in Connecticut =

The U.S. state of Connecticut has fourteen active lighthouses in the state, two of which are maintained as private aids; six are standing but inactive. Another was destroyed after its deactivation. The earliest lighthouse in the state was erected in 1760, but that tower, the first New London Harbor Light, was replaced in 1801, and its successor is the oldest surviving light in Connecticut, as well as the tallest. The last officially recognized lighthouse in the state, the Avery Point Light, was constructed in 1943, but was not lit until the following year. The Mystic Seaport Light, constructed in 1966, is a functioning replica housed with a historic Fresnel lens; it is classified as an unofficial and non-navigational aid.

| Name | Location | Coordinates | Image | Focal Height | Built (Note: If there is a second date, it represents the date the most recent tower was lit.) | Automated | Deactivated | Status |
|---|---|---|---|---|---|---|---|---|
| Avery Point Light | Groton | 41.3153°N 72.0636°W | | 55 ft (17 m) | 1944 | | 1967–2006 | Active; private aid |
| Black Rock Harbor Light | Fayerweather Island | 41.1423°N 73.2173°W | A black and white photograph of Black Rock Harbor Light | 44 ft (13 m) | 1808/1823 | | 1932 | Relit in 2000 as non-navigational light. |
| Bridgeport Harbor Light | Bridgeport | 41.1567°N 73.1798°W | A photograph of the Bridgeport Harbor Light | 52 ft (16 m) | 1851/1871 | | 1953 | Destroyed by fire in 1953 while dismantling the lighthouse; was replaced with a skeleton tower. |
| Falkner Island Light | Guilford | 41.2121°N 72.6536°W | A black and white photograph of Faulkner Island Light | 94 ft (29 m) | 1802 | 1978 | — | Active |
| Five Mile Point Light (Note: Also known as New Haven Harbor Light.) | New Haven | 41.2490°N 72.9038°W | A photograph of Five Mile Point Light | 97 ft (30 m) | 1805/1845 | | 1877 | Inactive |
| Great Captain Island Light | Greenwich | 40.9825°N 73.6235°W | A photograph of Great Captain Island Light | 51 ft (16 m) | 1830/1868 | | 1970 | Non-navigational light |
| Greens Ledge Light | Norwalk | 41.0418°N 73.4438°W | A photograph of Greens Ledge Light | 62 ft (19 m) | 1902 | 1972 | — | Active |
| Lynde Point Light (Note: Also known as Saybrook Inner Light) | Old Saybrook | 41.2715°N 72.3430°W | A photograph of Lynde Point Light | 71 ft (22 m) | 1803/1838 | 1975 | — | Active |
| Morgan Point Light | Noank | 41.3164°N 71.9894°W | A photograph of Morgan Point Light | 61 ft (19 m) | 1831/1868 | | 1919 | Inactive |
| Mystic Seaport Light | Mystic, Connecticut | 41.2141°N 71.5811°W | A photograph of the Mystic Seaport Light | 26 ft (7.9 m) | 1966 | — | — | museum replica of Brant Point Light; not an aid to navigation |
| New London Harbor Light | New London | 41.3166°N 72.0898°W | A photograph of the New London Harbor Light | 89 ft (27 m) | 1760/1801 | 1912 | — | Active |
| New London Ledge Light | New London | 41.3059°N 72.0774°W | A photograph of the New London Ledge Light | 58 ft (18 m) | 1760/1909 | 1987 | — | Active |
| Pecks Ledge Light | Norwalk | 41.0774°N 73.3697°W | A photograph of Pecks Ledge Light | 61 ft (19 m) | 1906 | 1933 | — | Active |
| Penfield Reef Light | Fairfield | 41.1171°N 73.2221°W | A photograph of the Penfield Reef Light | 51 ft (16 m) | 1874 | 1971 | — | Active |
| Saybrook Breakwater Light (Note: Also known as Saybrook Outer Light) | Old Saybrook | 41.2632°N 72.3427°W | A photograph of the Saybrook Breakwater Light | 58 ft (18 m) | 1886 | 1959 | — | Active |
| Sheffield Island Light | Norwalk | 41.0488°N 73.4192°W | A photograph of the Sheffield Island Light | 51 ft (16 m) | 1828/1868 | | 1902 | Inactive |
| Southwest Ledge Light | New Haven | 41.2344°N 72.9122°W | A photograph of the Southwest Ledge Light | 57 ft (17 m) | 1877 | 1973 | — | Active |
| Stamford Harbor Ledge Light | Stamford | 41.0136°N 73.5428°W | A postcard with a photograph of the Stamford Harbor Ledge Light | 80 ft (24 m) | 1882 | 1953 | | Active; private aid |
| Stonington Harbor Light | Stonington | 41.3285°N 71.9055°W | A photograph of the Stonington Harbor Light | 62 ft (19 m) | 1823/1840 | 1889 | | Inactive; museum |
| Stratford Point Light | Stratford | 41.1520°N 73.1032°W | A photograph of the Stratford Point Light | 52 ft (16 m) | 1822/1881 | 1970 | — | Active |
| Stratford Shoal Light | Long Island Sound east of Bridgeport | 41.0598°N 73.1013°W | A photograph of the Stratford Shoal Light | 60 ft (18 m) | 1877 | 1970 | — | Active |
| Tongue Point Light (Note: Also known as Bridgeport Breakwater Light or Bug Light) | Bridgeport | 41.1666°N 73.1775°W | A photograph of Tongue Point Light | 31 ft (9.4 m) | 1895 | 1954 | 1954 | Active |
