= Saybrook Breakwater Light =

Saybrook Breakwater Light Saybrook Outer
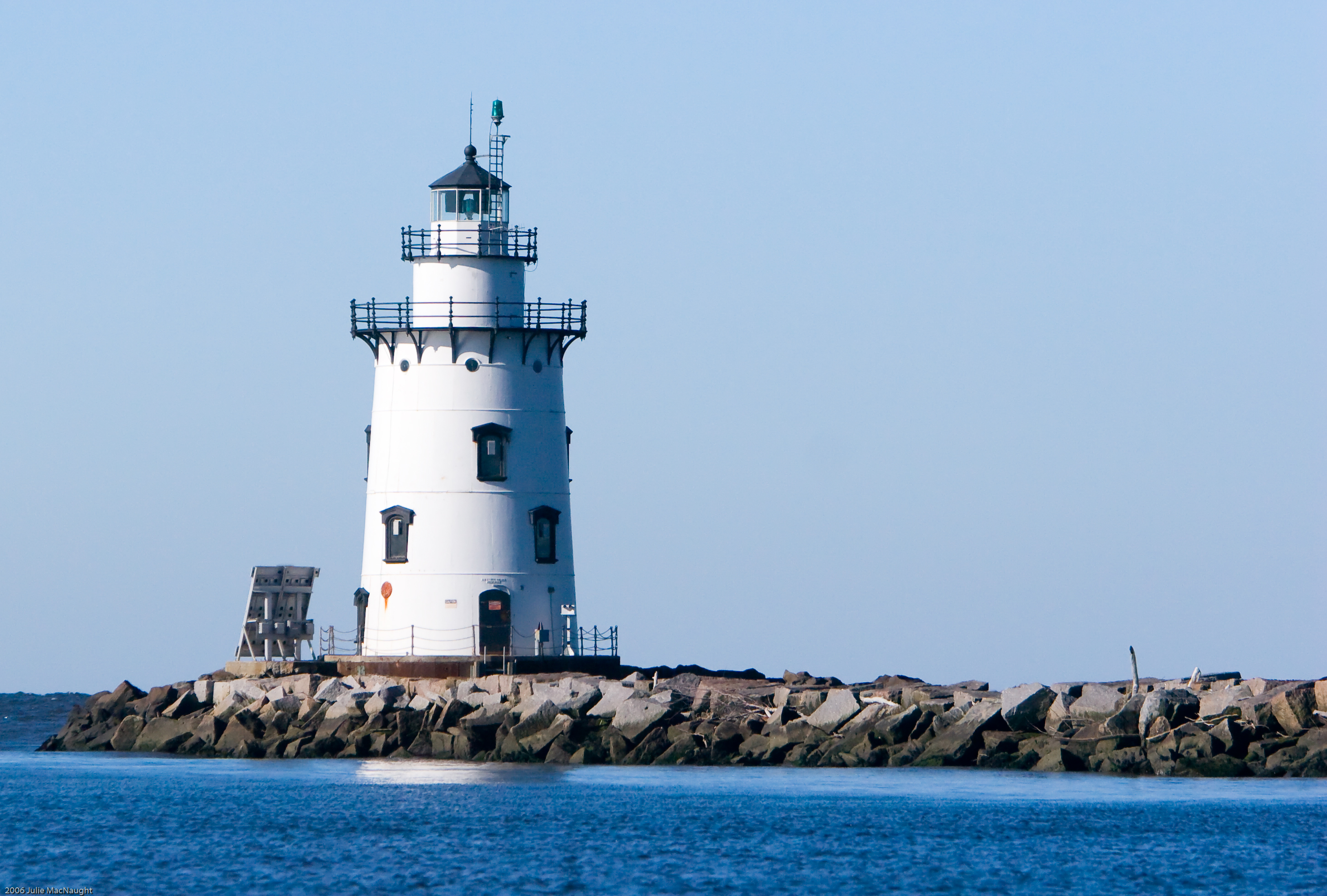
- Saybrook Breakwater Light
- Location: Old Saybrook; Connecticut; United States
- Coordinates: 41°15′47.68″N 72°20′34″W

Tower
- Constructed: 1886
- Foundation: cast iron and concrete caisson
- Construction: sparkplug lighthouse
- Automated: 1959
- Height: 48 feet (15 m)
- Shape: 2-stages cylindrical tower with double balcony and lantern incorporating keeper's quarter
- Power source: solar power
- Operator: United States Coast Guard
- Heritage: National Register of Historic Places listed place

Light
- Focal height: 58 feet (18 m)
- Lens: Fifth order Fresnel lens (original), 300 mm lens (current)
- Characteristic: Fl G 6s.
- Saybrook Breakwater Lighthouse
- U.S. National Register of Historic Places
- Location: Southern terminus of Saybrook Jetty at mouth of Connecticut River, Old Saybrook, Connecticut
- Area: less than one acre
- Built: 1886
- Architect: Smith, G.W. & F. Iron Co.
- MPS: Operating Lighthouses in Connecticut MPS
- NRHP reference No.: 89001474
- Added to NRHP: May 29, 1990

Saybrook Breakwater Lighthouse is a sparkplug lighthouse in Connecticut, United States, at Fenwick Point at the mouth of the Connecticut River near Old Saybrook, Connecticut. It is featured on the state's "Preserve the Sound" license plates.

"That outer lighthouse is the symbol of Old Saybrook," town First Selectman Michael Pace said in 2007, when the town was making plans to buy the lighthouse from the federal government.

The lighthouse is also known simply as "Breakwater Light" or "Outer Light". It is one of two built off Lynde Point in the nineteenth century. The other lighthouse, known as Lynde Point Light or more commonly as "Inner Light", is 75 years older than this lighthouse. The two lighthouses mark the harbor channel at the mouth of the Connecticut River.

== History ==
The Saybrook Breakwater Light forms an integral part of what has been referred to as "lighthouse alley" — a system of navigational safety points along Chimney Point and Fenwick Point that provided secure access to small vessels entering the Connecticut River [^2^]. It stands proud today as one among a few remaining spark-plug styled lighthouses dotted along New England's seacoast.

== Construction And Design ==
The construction process for erecting the Saybrook Breakwater took some time. The original breakwater was constructed between 1874 and 1877 under President Ulysses Grant's administration. However, it wasn't until several years later that Congress appropriated funds for its completion.

Designed by Francis Hopkinson Smith, an author of 'Caleb West' and an experienced civil engineer who contributed to constructing the base for The Statue of Liberty, he drew plans out using selected brownstone from local quarries 3. The material chosen for this light was reflective of others built during this era on the East Coast simplex Americana framework.

A cast-iron lantern atop a round tower served as the light source for passing ships. Originally fitted with a fourth-order Fresnel lens that emitted red flashes every twenty seconds[^4^], it was later upgraded to modern optic lights emanating automated beacon signals distinguished by two seconds flash after every six seconds.

== Operational history ==
Saybrook Breakwater Light, through years of its operational history, underwent a series of modifications both in terms of its physical acquisition and technical changes in lighting apparatuses. Initially run by specially appointed lighthouse keepers, it was fully automated by 1959[^5^].

Since 1986, it has been owned and maintained by the Beacon Preservation group who purchased it from the General Services Administration (GSA) under the National Historic Lighthouse Preservation Act (NHLPA)[^6^]. The group also offers educational programming using the lighthouse as a marine laboratory.

== Public Access and Recognition ==
Saybrook Breakwater Light is not open to public due to its off-shore location. However, it is visible from the shores of Old Saybrook and can be appreciated from a distance through field glasses or telescopes. It still serves as an active aid to navigation.

The lighthouse is featured on Connecticut's 'Preserve America' commemorative quarter released in 2020[^7^]. As indicative of its historic significance, it was listed on The National Register of Historic Places in September 1990.

== Trivia ==
It's interesting to note that Saybrook Breakwater Light became emblematic because of its appearance on a box of Land O' Lakes butter. An artist named Harley W. Griffiths painted it during sunset from a picture taken by Jarvis Andrews in 1959[^8^]. This very replication gained nationwide recognition as butter was distributed throughout the country.

Saybrook Breakwater Light in Old Saybrook, was used as the lighthouse in the 2021 thriller film "A Predator Returns".

[^1^]: Rowlett, Russ (2012). "Lighthouses of the United States: Connecticut". The Lighthouse Directory. University of North Carolina at Chapel Hill.

[^2^]: Department of Commerce - U.S. Coast and Geodetic Survey. (1926). United States Coast Pilot, Atlantic Coast, New York to Point Judith.

[^3^]: Morris, J: Northeast Lights: Lighthouses and Lightships, Rhode Island to Cape May, New Jersey. (1989). Sea Sports Publication

[^4^]: Coast Guard Lighthouses (2021). Naval History & Heritage Command

[^5^]: Wright, Larry P., Old Saybrook (1976). Arcadia Publishing

[^6^]: Programmatic Agreement on the National Historic Lighthouse Preservation Act of 2000

[^7^]: National Park Service News Release: American Memorial Park Quarter Launch and Coin Exchange (April 30, 2019)

== Head keepers ==
- Frank W. Paumlee (1886 – 1890)
- John G. Shipworth (1890 – 1896)
- George W. Fife (1896 – 1897)
- Robert A. Bishop (1897 – 1898)
- Nathaniel Dodge (1898)
- Thomas Burke (1898 – 1899)
- John Dahlman (1899 – 1907)
- Herbert S. Knowles (1907 – 1911)
- Simon Sfvorinich (1911 – 1912)
- Joseph F. Woods (1912 – at least 1917)
- John A. Davis (at least 1919 – 1920)
- Paul G. Peterson (1920 – at least 1921)
- Elwood L. Butler (at least 1923)
- Andrew A. McLintock (1932 – 1935)
- Sidney Z. Gross (at least 1938 – 1940)
- Roger H. Green (1940 – 1943)
- Thomas A. Buckridge (1943 – 1944)
- George E. Sheffield (1948 – 1953)

== See also ==
- List of lighthouses in Connecticut
- List of lighthouses in the United States
- National Register of Historic Places listings in Middlesex County, Connecticut
