= Abisha Woodward =

American architect

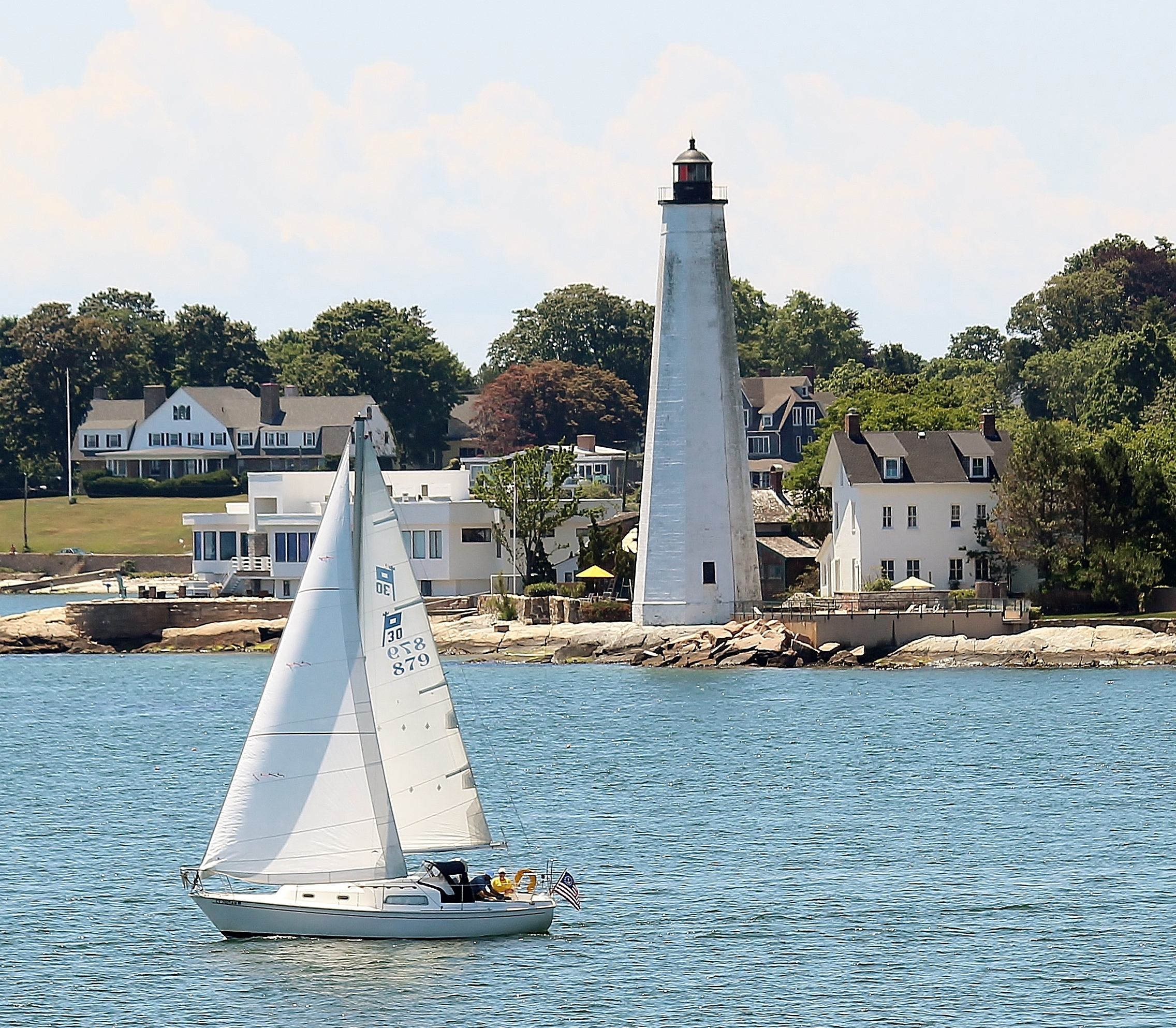
The New London Harbor Lighthouse, completed by Woodward in 1801, remains an active navigational aid.

Abisha Woodward (1752–1809), also known as Abashai Woodward, was an architect and contractor from New London, Connecticut, that is best known for building lighthouses in the United States. He oversaw the construction of many of Connecticut's earliest lighthouses, but also worked in New York and North Carolina during his career. The oldest surviving beacon built by Woodward is the New London Harbor Lighthouse, which he completed in 1801.

== Career ==
Woodward distinguished himself in New London as a fine architect and contractor. Prior to building lighthouses, he was co-named in a contract for building New London's new meetinghouse in 1788. Home construction in town likely kept him busy around 1790, a time during which New London was experiencing significant growth.

Woodward's work on lighthouses began with a federal contract he won in 1793 to complete the Bald Head Light at Cape Fear, North Carolina, which was already partially constructed prior to his arrival. He later submitted a bid in 1796 to build the Montauk Point Lighthouse, but lost the contract to John McComb. After the turn of the century, Woodward secured contracts to oversee the construction of five lighthouses along the Connecticut coast and one in New York on the east end of Long Island.

Woodward constructed both wooden and stone lighthouses during his career. The last and longest-lived of his wooden lighthouses was replaced in 1841 after 36 years of service. Two of Woodward's stone lighthouses, the New London Harbor Lighthouse completed in 1801 and the Faulkner's Island Lighthouse completed 1802, remain standing to this day and still serve as active aids to navigation.

== Personal life ==
Abisha Woodward was born in 1752 and married Mary Spicer on March 20, 1774. He lived in New London, Connecticut where he was a prominent architect, contractor and alderman. Several of his children were born in Preston, Connecticut, suggesting that he probably lived there for some time, as well. Woodward owned extensive property in the southern states and bought some 4,000 acres of land in the north of Ohio, known at that time as the Firelands, to benefit the widows and orphans of Revolutionary War soldiers. He died on April 10, 1809, in New London.

== List of lighthouses constructed ==
Lighthouse	Location	Date of completion	Materials	Extant?
Bald Head Lighthouse	Smith Township, North Carolina	1794		No, replaced in 1817
New London Harbor Lighthouse	New London, Connecticut	1801	granite, brownstone, brick	Yes
Lynde Point Lighthouse	Old Saybrook, Connecticut	1802	wood	No, replaced in 1838
Faulkner's Island Lighthouse	Guilford, Connecticut	1802	brownstone	Yes
Five Mile Point Lighthouse	New Haven, Connecticut	1805	wood	No, replaced in 1841
Little Gull Island Lighthouse	Southold, New York	1805	stone	No, replaced in 1869
Black Rock Harbor Lighthouse	Bridgeport, Connecticut	1808	wood	No, replaced in 1823
