= Mystic Seaport Light =

Lighthouse upriver from Noank, Connecticut

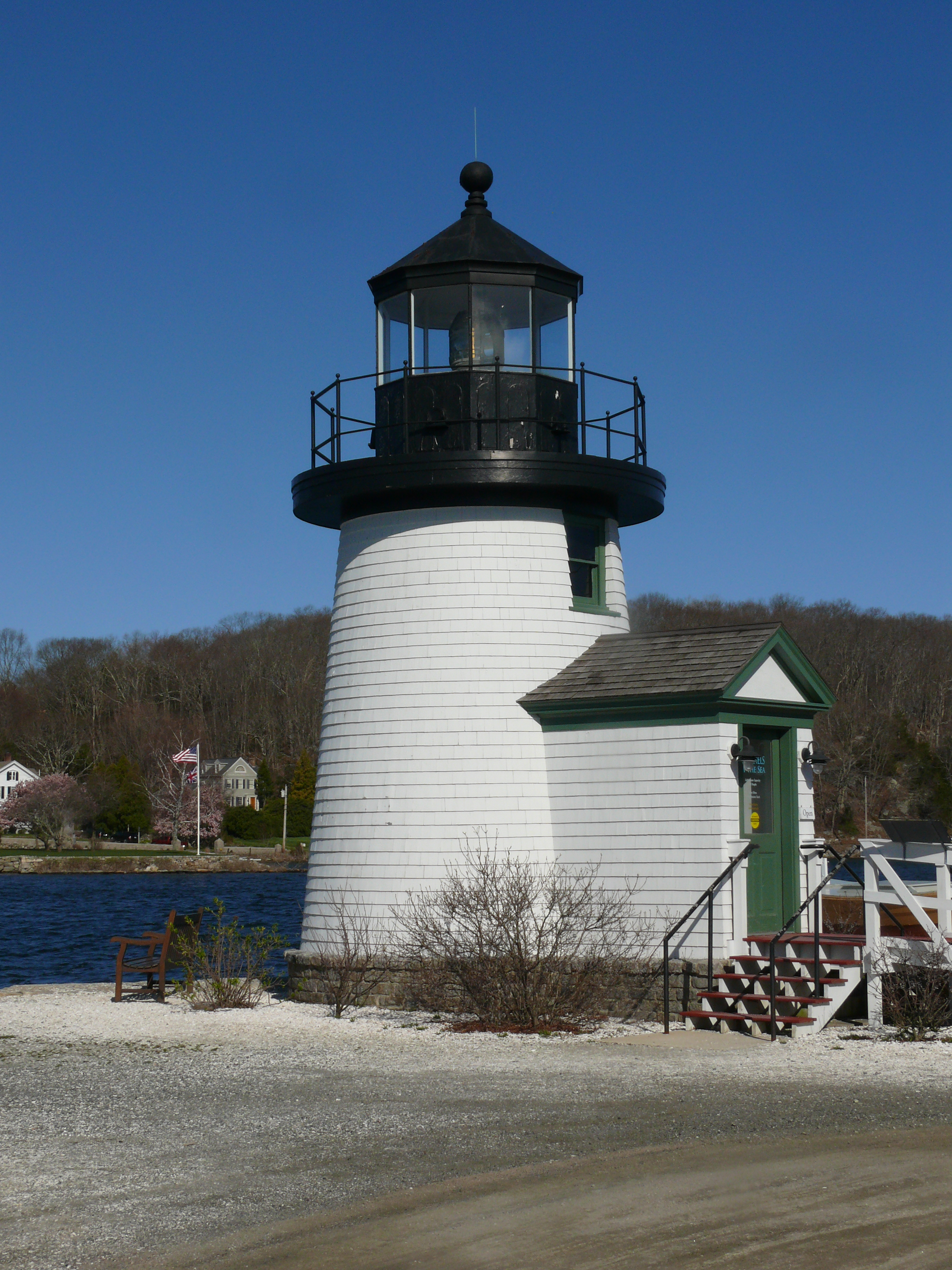
- Mystic Seaport Light in 2008
- Location: Mystic, Connecticut, United States
- Coordinates: 41°21′41″N 71°58′01″W

Tower
- Constructed: 1966
- Construction: wood (tower)
- Height: 25 ft (7.6 m)
- Shape: conical tower with balcony and lantern
- Markings: White (tower), black (lantern)
- Operator: Mystic Seaport

Light
- Focal height: 26 ft (7.9 m)
- Lens: fourth order Fresnel lens
- Characteristic: F W

Mystic Seaport Light is a lighthouse at the south end of Mystic Seaport, 2 miles (3.2 km) upriver from Noank, Connecticut. It is a two-story white shingled structure topped with a glass-enclosed lantern, a replica of the 1901 Brant Point Light. The Mystic Seaport Light was designed by William F. Herman Jr. and constructed in 1966. It was formally dedicated on August 31, 1967, but it remained unlit due to navigational regulations imposed by the United States Coast Guard. The Mystic Seaport light is now an active light, but not an official aid to navigation.

The structure was used as an example of a lighthouse for Mystic Seaport visitors, but it was not part of an exhibit until a 2008 renovation. The interior of the lighthouse was equipped with five LCD televisions to display two short educational films that highlight the history and architectural diversity of American lighthouses.

== Design and construction ==
The Mystic Seaport Light was designed by William F. Herman Jr. and constructed by Engineered Building in 1966. Funds for the project were donated by Mr. and Mrs. John P. Blair. Mr. Blair was a member of the Board of Trustees of the Marine Historical Association since 1963. The Marine Historical Association was the original name for the Mystic Seaport. Coast Guard Auxiliary members from Maine and Delaware donated $5,000 to build the keeper's cottage.

The original artist's conception called for a generic lighthouse that was designed to be representative of all lighthouses, but the design was changed to a replica of the 1901 Brant Point Light located on Nantucket Island in Massachusetts. It is a two-story white shingled structure topped with a glass-enclosed lantern standing at the tip of Shipyard Point. The light measures 18 feet (5.5 m) by 12 feet (3.7 m) by 38 feet (12 m). The lighthouse houses a fourth order Fresnel lens.

The design of the keeper's house did not change much from the original artist's conception, though Tim Harrison notes that "it does not resemble a typical lighthouse keeper's house." The dedication of the lighthouse was held on August 31, 1967, which was described as "another quiet but proud ceremony" by Mystic Seaport. Care and maintenance of the lighthouse is performed by the Mystic Seaport.

== Operational requirements ==
The Mystic Seaport Light is subject to United States Coast Guard regulations to become operational because it is a full-sized replica of a lighthouse; requirements include supervisory schedules and installation of an emergency backup light. This was not a financial priority for Mystic Seaport in 1967 and it was not made a fully functional lighthouse.

In 1979, Brierley noted that the present use of the lighthouse remained as "an example of a lighthouse used as a navigational aid." It was used as the starting mark for the Mystic River Day seine boat race in 1981. It became active in 2014, using a fourth order Fresnel lens on loan from the Coast Guard, but it is not an official aid to navigation.

== Design renovation ==
In late 2007, the Mystic Seaport asked Oudens Ello Architecture of Boston to develop a design proposal for the light. Oudens Ello Architecture developed a "multilayered system of open wood slats and sound absorptive material creating an interior environment evocative of a Nantucket basket." The task called for an "audio-visual display in a single, conical room of little more than 100 square feet." The renovated exhibit was also made wheelchair accessible via a ramp.

== Sentinels of the Sea ==
In July 2008, the Mystic Seaport Light became part of the visitor experience when the interior was opened as part of the "Sentinels of the Sea" exhibit. The exhibit displays two short educational films, The Heyday of Lighthouses and How to Look at a Lighthouse, on five LCD screens. The two films highlight the history and architectural diversity of American lighthouses.

== See also ==
- List of lighthouses in Connecticut
- List of lighthouses in the United States
