= Stratford Point Light =

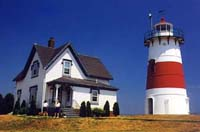
- Stratford Point Lighthouse
- Location: Stratford, Connecticut; United States
- Coordinates: 41°09′07.19″N 73°06′11.78″W

Tower
- Constructed: 1822 (first)
- Foundation: concrete
- Construction: cast iron tower
- Automated: 1970
- Height: 35 ft (11 m)
- Shape: conical tower with balcony and lantern
- Markings: white tower with brias red band, red lantern roof
- Operator: United States Coast Guard
- Heritage: National Register of Historic Places listed place

Light
- First lit: 1881 (current)
- Focal height: 52 ft (16 m)
- Lens: First order Fresnel lens (1855); Third order Fresnel lens (1881); Fourth order Fresnel lens (1906); 190 mm lens (1990)
- Range: 16 nmi (30 km; 18 mi)
- Characteristic: Fl (2) W 20s.
- Stratford Point Lighthouse
- U.S. National Register of Historic Places
- Area: less than one acre
- Built: 1881
- Architectural style: Late Victorian
- MPS: Operating Lighthouses in Connecticut MPS
- NRHP reference No.: 89001476
- Added to NRHP: May 29, 1990

Stratford Point Light is a historic lighthouse in the Lordship neighborhood of Stratford, Connecticut, United States, at the mouth of the Housatonic River. The second tower was one of the first prefabricated cylindrical lighthouses in the country and remains active.

It sits on a 4-acre (1.6 ha) tract at the southeastern tip of Stratford Point.

== History ==
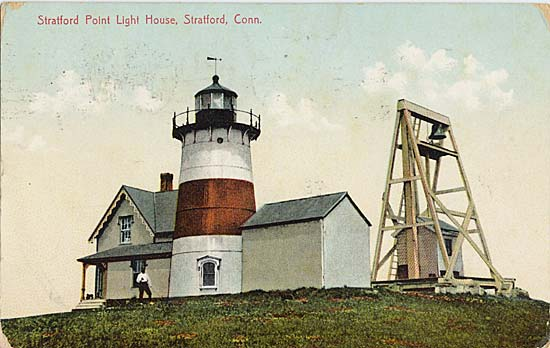
1908 postcard

The first Stratford Point Lighthouse was built in 1822. In 1855 a fifth order lens was added to the 28-foot (8.5 m) wooden tower. In 1881, the tower and dwelling were razed and replaced with a 35-foot (11 m) tall, brick lined cast-iron tower and equipped with a third order Fresnel lens. The light was automated in 1970 with a modern beacon. It is an active aid to navigation and is used for Coast Guard housing.

The lighthouse was added to the National Register of Historic Places in 1990.

== Head keepers ==
- Samuel Buddington (1822 – 1843)
- William Merwin (1843 – 1844)
- Samuel Buddington (1844 – 1848)
- Amy Buddington (1848 – 1861)
- Rufus Warren Buddington (1861 – 1869)
- Benedict Lillingston (1869 – 1874)
- John L. Brush (1874 – 1879)
- Jerome B. Tuttle (1879 – 1880)
- Theodore Judson (1880 – 1919)
- William F. Petzolt (1919 – 1946)
- Daniel F. McCoart (1946 – 1963)
- Richard L. Fox (1963 – )

== See also ==
- List of lighthouses in Connecticut
- List of lighthouses in the United States
- National Register of Historic Places listings in Fairfield County, Connecticut
