= Caisson lighthouse =

Lighthouse whose superstructure rests on a concrete or metal caisson

A caisson lighthouse (also referred to as a sparkplug lighthouse, or bug light) is a type of lighthouse whose superstructure rests on a concrete or metal caisson. Caisson lighthouses were developed in the late nineteenth century as a cheaper alternative to screwpile lighthouses. The caisson design was also more efficient as it could better withstand harsh weather, and was not as fragile. Caisson lighthouses usually have living quarters made of cast iron, although some brick examples are known. The two American nicknames were later coined because of the structure's shape.

== Gallery ==
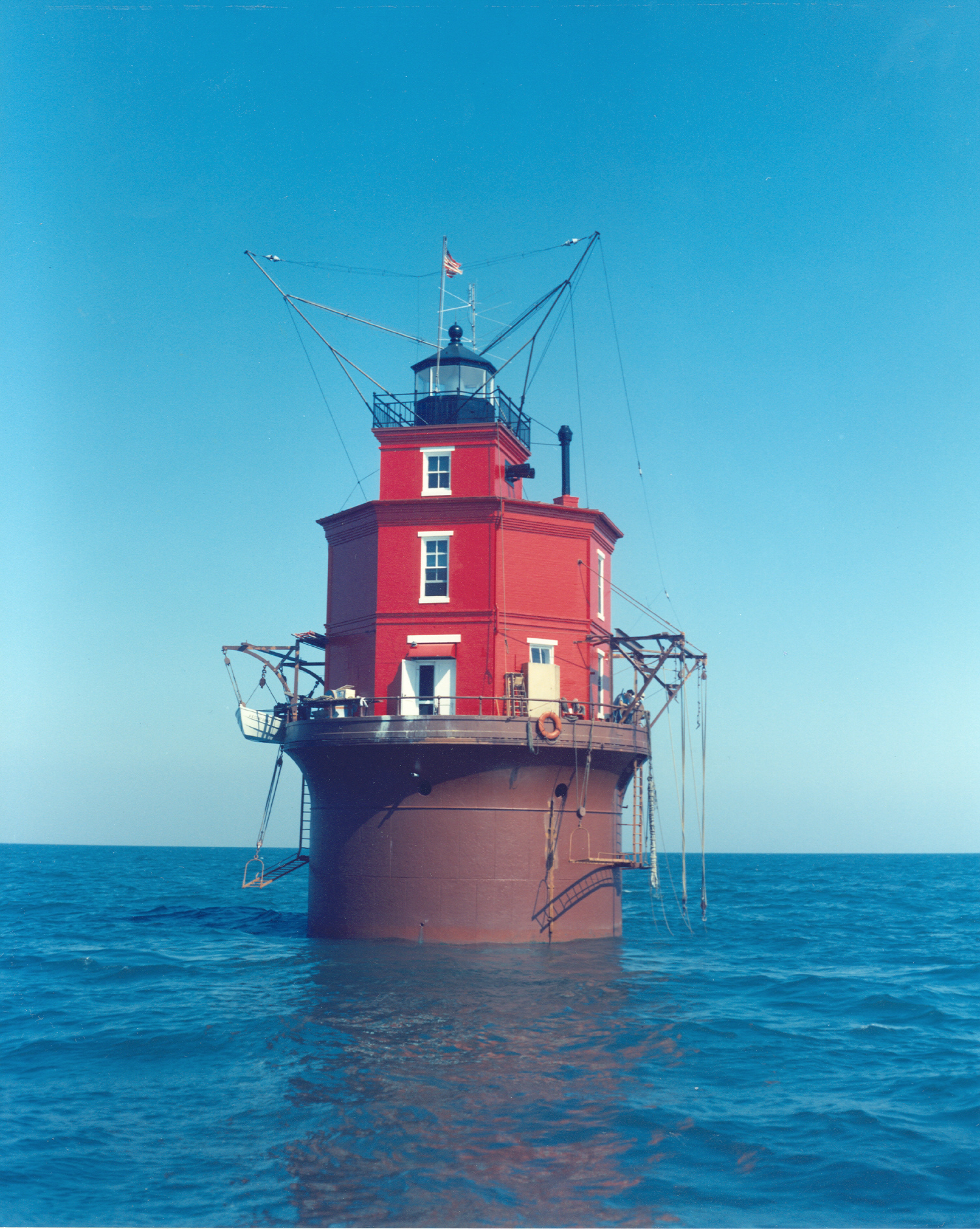
Wolf Trap Light
a caisson lighthouse in the Chesapeake Bay

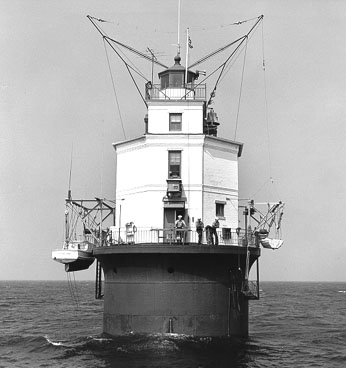
Smith Point Light
located at the mouth of the Potomac River

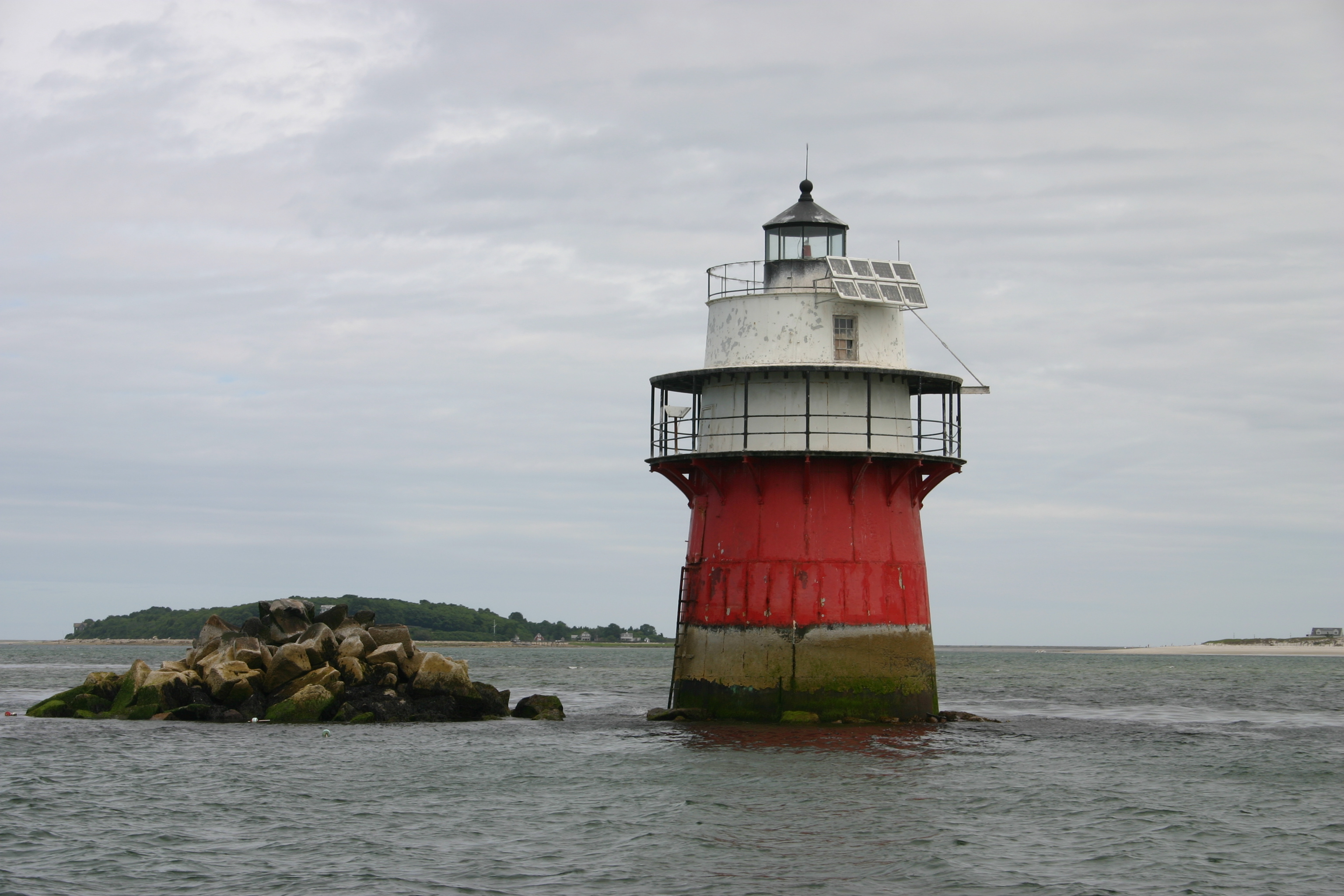
Duxbury Pier Light
in Plymouth Harbor, Massachusetts, was the first of its kind in New England.

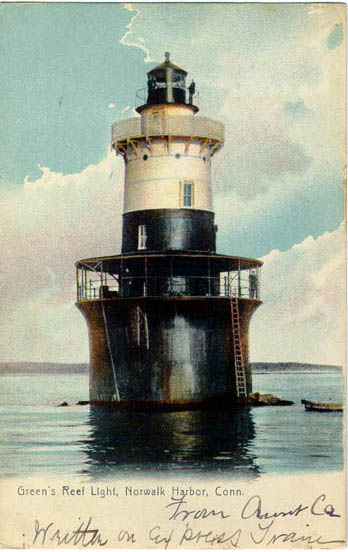
Greens Ledge Light
stands in open water about 10 feet (3.0 m) deep, about 1 km from land

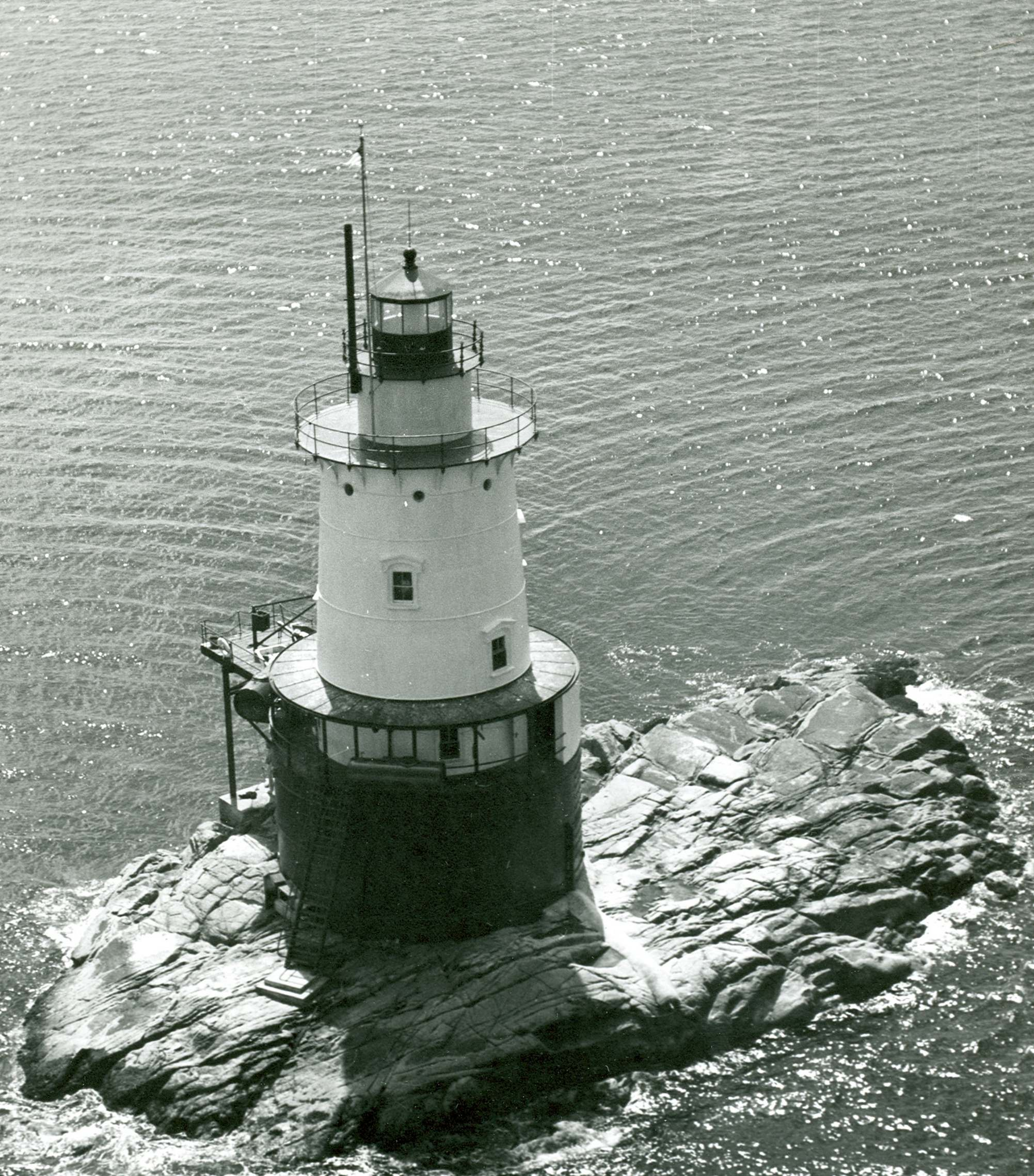
Sakonnet Light
is on a small rock

== See also ==
Media related to Lighthouses built on caissons at Wikimedia Commons
