= New London Harbor Light =

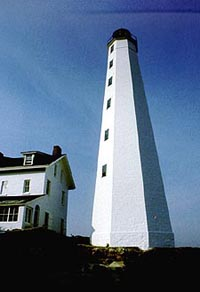
- New London Harbor Light (by USCG/1984)
- Location: Pequot Avenue at Lighthouse Point, New London; Connecticut; United States
- Coordinates: 41°19′00.0″N 72°05′23.1″W

Tower
- Constructed: 1760; 266 years ago (first)
- Foundation: surface rock
- Construction: brownstone tower
- Automated: 1912; 114 years ago
- Height: 89 ft (27 m)
- Shape: tapered octagonal tower with balcony and lantern
- Markings: white tower, black lantern
- Operator: New London Maritime Society
- Heritage: National Register of Historic Places listed place

Light
- First lit: 1801; 225 years ago (current)
- Focal height: 90 ft (27 m)
- Lens: 11 lamps, 13 inch reflectors (original), Fourth order Fresnel lens (current)
- Intensity: 6,000 candela
- Range: 17 nautical miles (31 km; 20 mi)
- Characteristic: Iso W 6s, R sector
- New London Harbor Lighthouse
- U.S. National Register of Historic Places
- Area: less than one acre
- Built: 1801
- Built by: A. Woodward (1801); Charles H. Smith (1833 repairs)
- MPS: Operating Lighthouses in Connecticut MPS
- NRHP reference No.: 89001470
- Added to NRHP: May 29, 1990

New London Harbor Light is a lighthouse in Connecticut on the west side of the New London harbor entrance. It is the nation's fifth oldest light station and the seventh oldest U.S. lighthouse. It is both the oldest and the tallest lighthouse in Connecticut and on Long Island Sound, with its tower reaching 90 feet.

The light is visible for 15 miles and consists of three seconds of white light every six seconds. It was listed on the National Register of Historic Places in 1990. It is currently owned and maintained by the New London Maritime Society as part of the National Historic Lighthouse Preservation Act program.

== Location ==
New London Harbor Light is located at Lighthouse Point in southern New London, just east of Guthrie Beach off Pequot Avenue. In addition to the lighthouse, the station includes the keeper's house, a two-and-a-half-story brick residence. The property once also included a barn, an oil house, and an engine room; all of these structures have been removed.

== History ==
The original New London Harbor Lighthouse was built on the west side of the entrance to New London Harbor in 1760. Connecticut ceded the lighthouse to the United States according to the "Memoranda of Cessions" of 7 August 1789.

On May 7, 1800, Congress appropriated funds to rebuild the lighthouse, and it was removed in 1801 when the current stone tower was built. In 1855, a fourth-order Fresnel lens replaced the original 11 lamps with 13-inch (330 mm) reflectors. Illumination was converted to oil-vapor lamp in 1909 and to acetylene in 1912. The light was electrified in 1930. The present keeper's house was built in 1863, and was enlarged in 1900 to accommodate the families of married keepers. The light was acquired by the New London Maritime Society in 2010.

== Head keepers ==
- Nathaniel Shaw (1761 – at least 1771)
- Daniel Harris (at least 1775 – at least 1802)
- Griswold Harris (1811 – at least 1825)
- Jeremiah Harris (at least 1827 – 1831)
- S.J. Beckwith (1831 – 1832)
- John G. Munn (1832 – 1841)
- John Mason (1841 – 1844)
- Nathan Buddington (1844 – 1845)
- George K. Comstock (1845 – 1850)
- Thomas Fisk (1850)
- John Mason (1850 – 1853)
- Lyman Reed (1853 – 1859)
- Elijah Bolles (1859 – 1861)
- Philip M. Boss (1861 – 1869)
- Charles A. Bunnell (1869 – 1889)
- Henry A. Whaley (1889)
- Charles B. Field (1889 – 1910)
- Theodore De Shong (1910 – 1911)
- Joseph F. Woods (1911 – 1912)

== Gallery ==
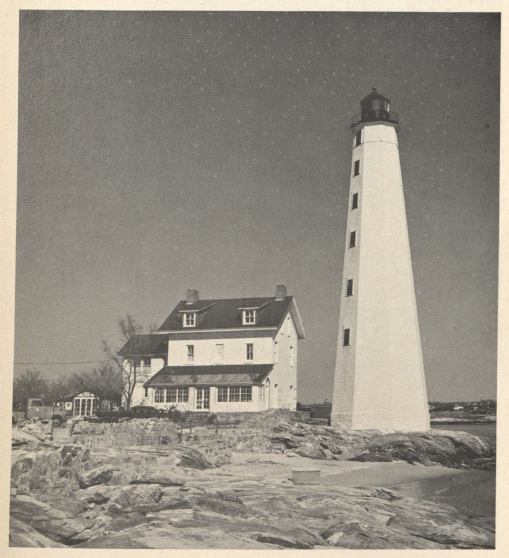
New London Harbor Lighthouse

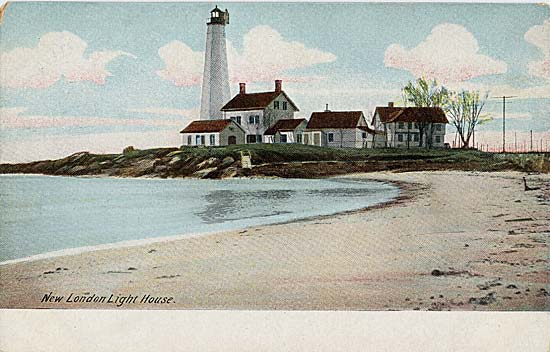
Postcard of the lighthouse, published 1901–1907

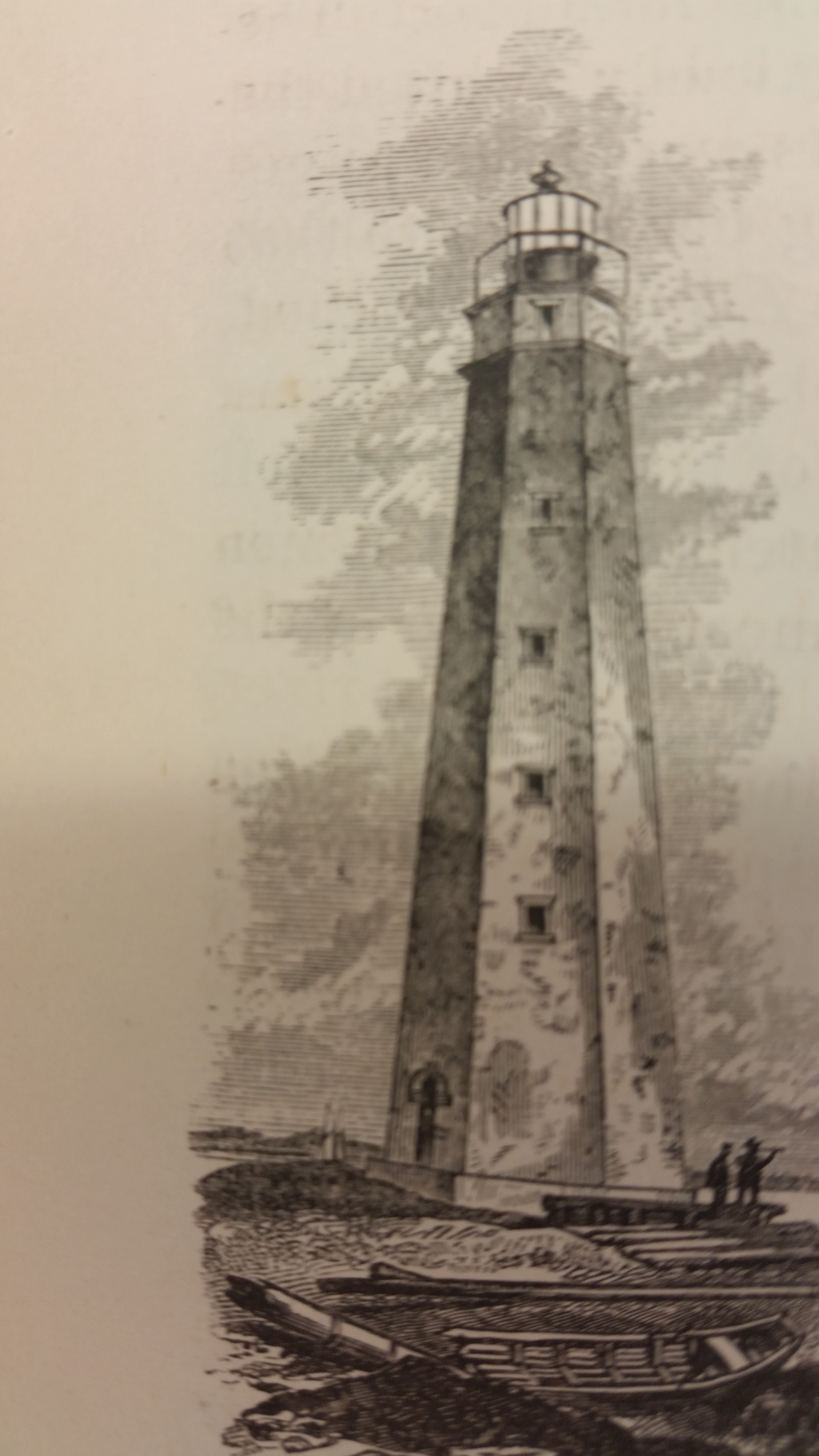
New London Light

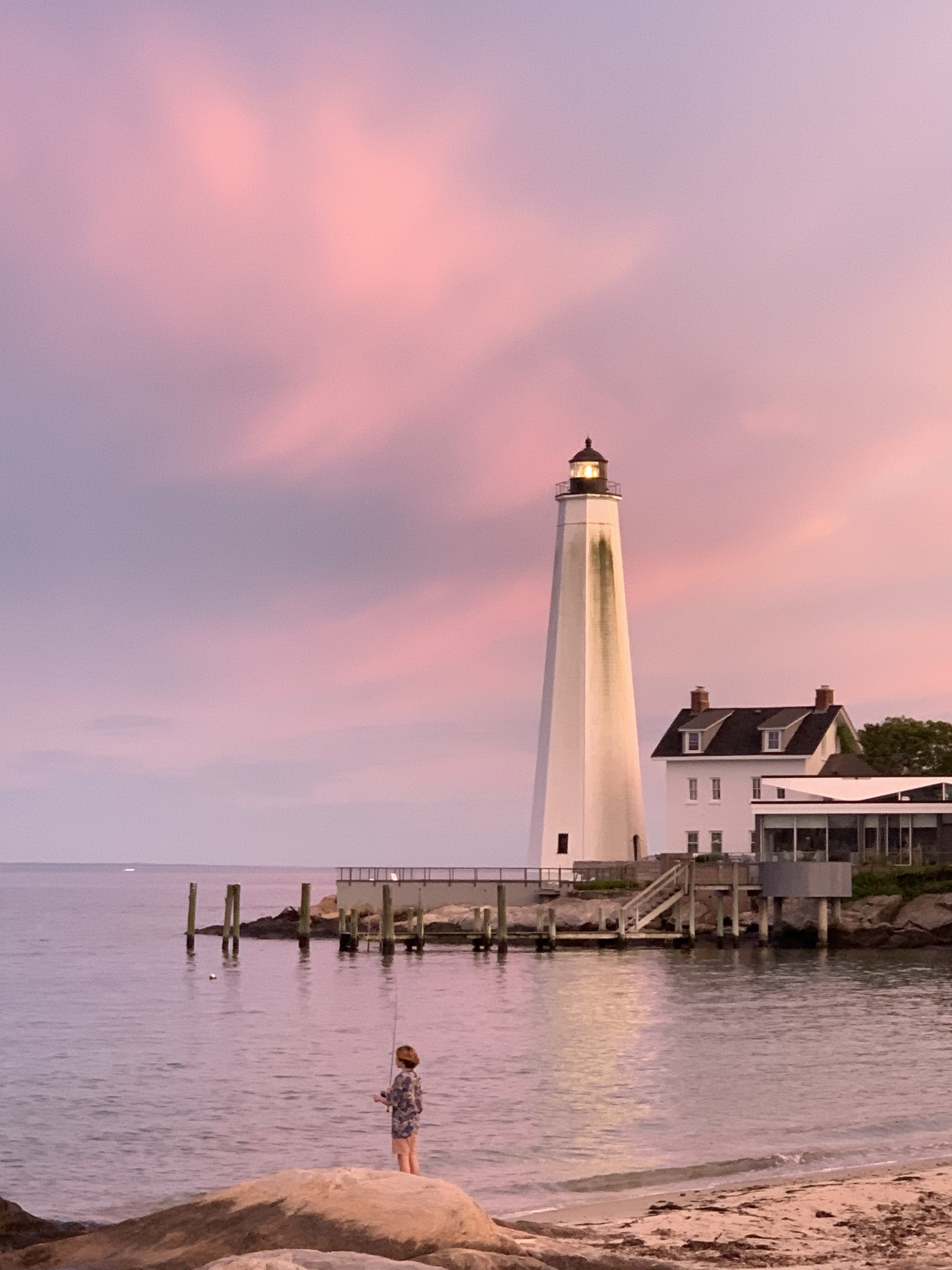
New London Harbor Lighthouse in 2020

== See also ==
- List of lighthouses in Connecticut
- List of lighthouses in the United States
- National Register of Historic Places listings in New London County, Connecticut
