= Geography of Bridgeport, Connecticut =

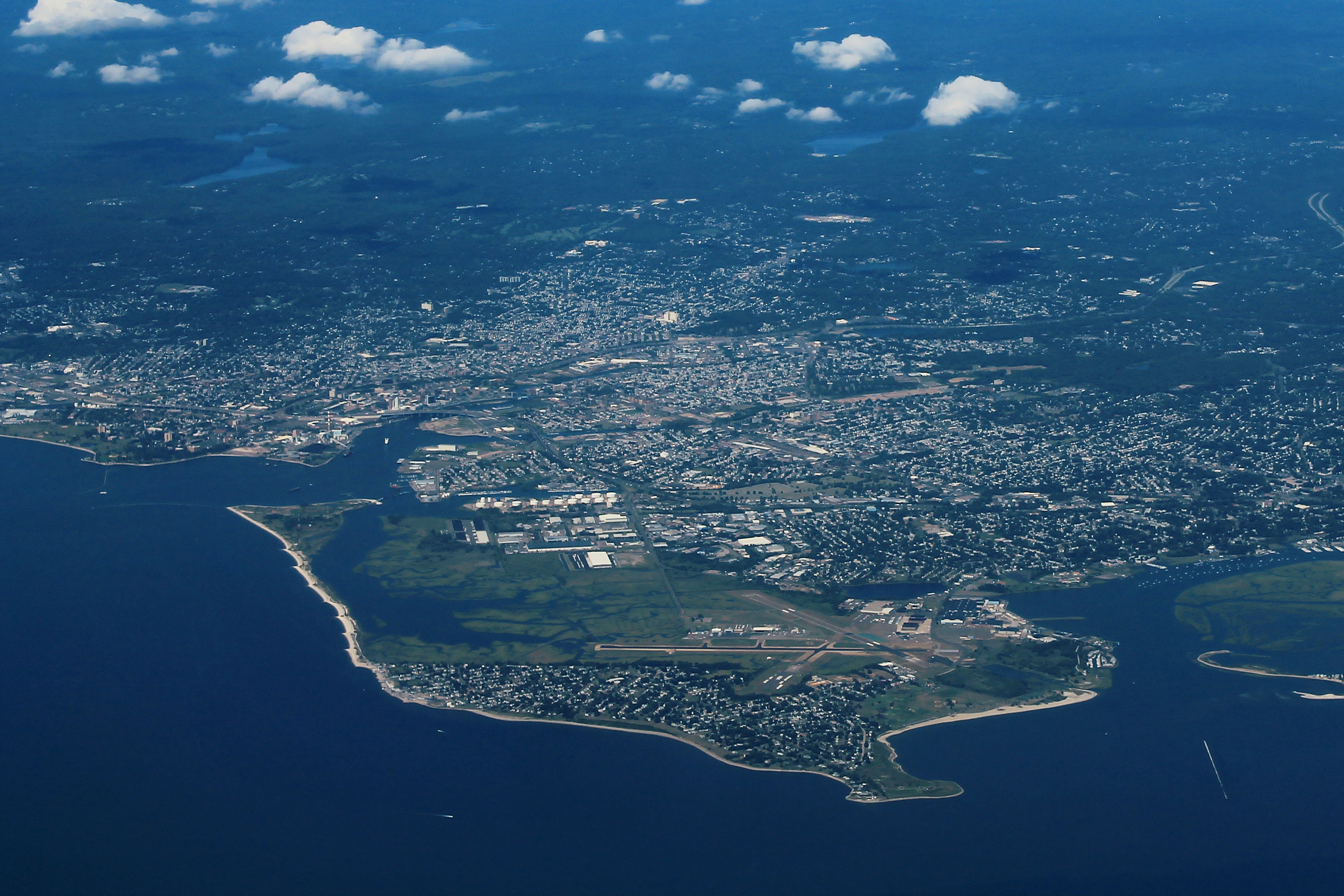
Aerial view of Bridgeport, Connecticut

Bridgeport, Connecticut is a major city of Connecticut located on Long Island Sound at the mouth of the Pequonnock River.

== Physical geography ==
Bridgeport Harbor is bordered by Long Island Sound and is formed by the estuary of the Pequonnock River and Yellow Mill and Johnson's Creeks, both tidal inlets. Between the estuary and Yellow Mill Pond is a peninsula, East Bridgeport, also known as the East Side, which was once the site of some of the largest manufacturing establishments in Connecticut, most of which no longer exist. On the far side of the Yellow Mill Pond inlet is the East End of Bridgeport, which is the easternmost portion of the city, which includes Pleasure Beach. Above the East End is the Mill Hill neighborhood and the border with Stratford, Connecticut. West of the Harbor and the Pequonnock River is the main portion of the city, with Downtown Bridgeport lining the river, the South End fronting on the lower harbor and Long Island Sound, the West Side between Fairfield, Connecticut and Downtown, and the North End extending from Downtown and the West Side to the border with Trumbull, Connecticut. Numerous factories, some of which are no longer in operation, line western sections the Metro North/New Haven Railroad line from the Bridgeport Station in Downtown, under Interstate 95 in the South End, and through the West Side and into Fairfield. The city is surrounded by hills up to 300 feet in height in the North End, the Upper East Side, and Mill Hill.

There are two major parks in Bridgeport, the "Park City." Beardsley is in the northeasterly part of the city and also contains Connecticut's only zoo, the Beardsley Zoo. It borders Bunnell's Pond, a 33-acre lake. Seaside is west of the harbor entrance and along the Sound in the South End. It has statues in honor of Elias Howe, who is credited with the invention of the sewing machine and who built a factory to manufacture his invention in the city 1863; and of P.T. Barnum, the showman, who lived in Bridgeport after 1846. He contributed much to the city, including the development of the East Side, Mountain Grove Cemetery, and Seaside Park. Seaside Park also has a soldiers' and sailors' monument. In the vicinity were located many upscale residences, now mostly demolished or converted to institutional use.

Aside from the Pequonnock River and Yellow Mill Pond, there is Cedar Creek, a canal-like tidal creek that lies between Black Rock and Seaside Park. Black Rock Harbor lies at the mouth of the creek.

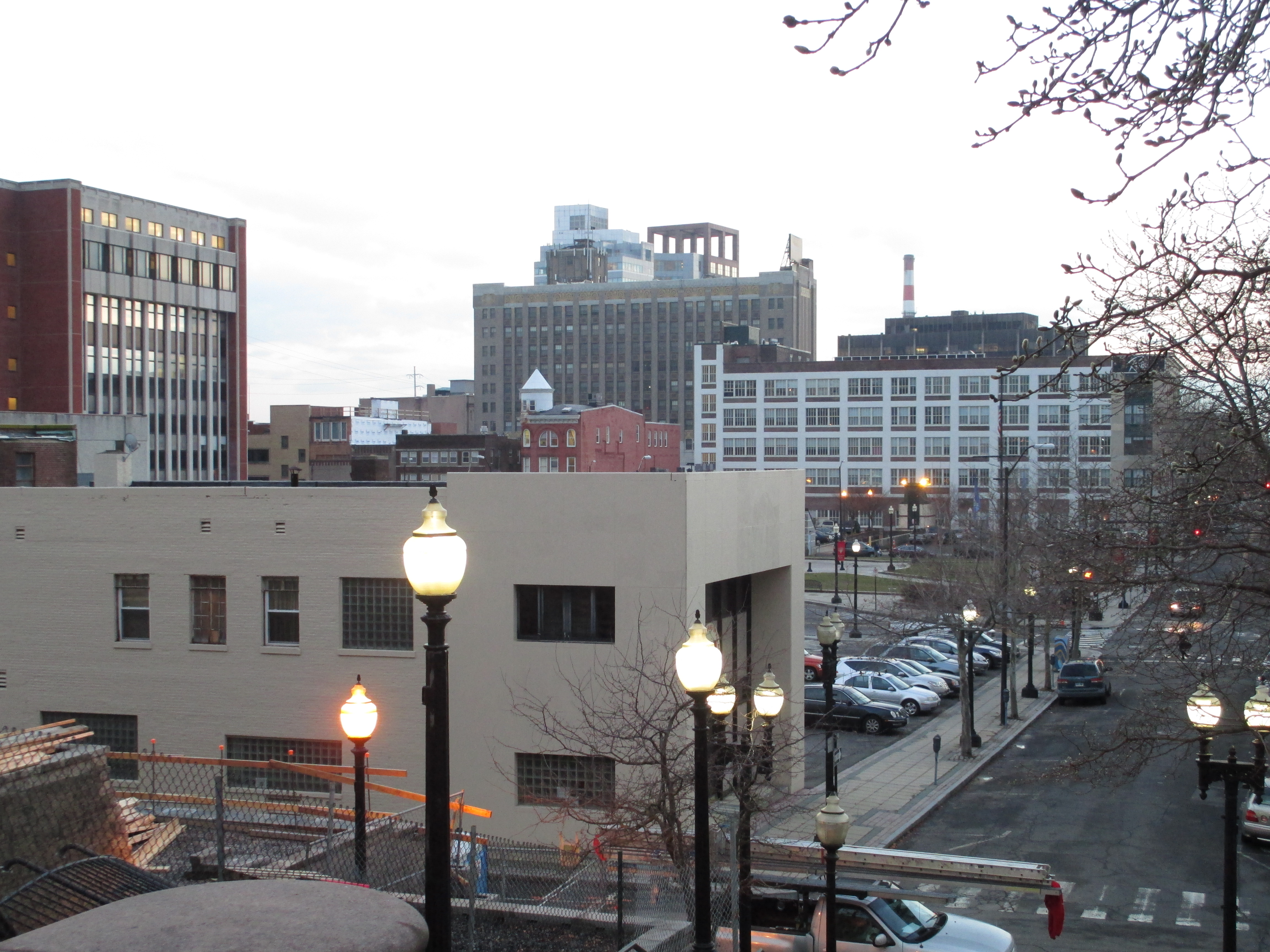
Downtown Bridgeport

The principal municipal buildings in Bridgeport are the city's two hospitals (St. Vincent's Medical Center and Bridgeport Hospital), the Barnum Museum, the Klein Memorial Auditorium, City Hall, the Fairfield County Courthouse, and the Main Post Office.

=== Bays and creeks ===
- Bridgeport Harbor is one of three (with New Haven and New London) major ports in Connecticut. It is formed by the confluence of Johnson's Creek, Yellow Mill Pond, and the Pequonnock River, and is the main outlet for the Great Meadows salt marsh in Stratford. In Colonial times it was known as "Newfield Harbor." Its large size—relative to the volume of the three small streams that empty into it—is attributable to the fact that, prior to the Wisconsin glaciation, it formed the mouth of the Housatonic River.
- Lewis Gut is a tidal strait that separates the Great Meadows marsh from Long Beach/Pleasure Beach. It takes its name from Benjamin Lewis, who cultivated oysters in its waters in the 19th century.
- Johnson's Creek is the estuary of Bruce Brook, at the easterly edge of the city and the westerly limit of the Great Meadows. It is named for the Johnson family, who assembled two large farms on either bank from the small holdings of the "New Field" in the early 19th century. A tide mill was built here shortly after the settlement of Stratford in 1639 (the mill pond backed up waters all the way to Stratford Avenue). In Colonial times it was known as Nessumpaws Creek, Neesingpaws Creek, or even Knees-and-Paws Creek.
- Walker's Creek (aka Power House Channel) was a tidal outlet from a salt marsh that was filled in to form Newfield and Jessup Parks. It survives today in truncated form as the outlet of the East End Sewage Treatment Plant.
- Yellow Mill Pond forms the estuary of Old Mill Brook. In 1792 its waters were dammed for the construction of a major tide mill, four stories in height, that was painted yellow. It burned in 1884 (the foundation can still be seen on the southwest side of the Stratford Avenue Bridge) and the dam was deconstructed shortly afterwards.
- Berkshire Mill Pond was the site of another tide mill at the confluence of the Pequonnock River and Island Brook. The milldam was constructed in 1786 just to the south of the Berkshire Avenue Bridge. The pond was largely filled in the 1940s and '50s for the construction of a shopping center, two drive-in movie theaters, and a collection of automobile junk yards. A small remnant remains.
- Black Rock Harbor is the located in the westerly portion of the city between Seaside Park and Black Rock. Its upper reaches penetrate the West End. In Colonial times this was considered the deepest and best port in Connecticut west of New London. It was able to accommodate ships of up to 1000 tons right up to the main wharves at the foot of the present Brewster Street. The harbor was protected on its south and east flanks by a Fayerweather Island that then included what is now the west end of Seaside Park. To the west and south was another landmass known as Lewis Island, which washed away during the course of the 18th century leaving only the treacherous shoal known as Penfield Reef. After the bar across the mouth of Bridgeport Harbor was dredged in the mid-19th century, Black Rock Harbor slipped into secondary importance.
- Cedar Creek is a navigable waterway through the city's West End that connects with Black Rock Harbor. In its natural state it was very similar to Lewis Gut in the East End and separated a salt marsh from a barrier beach (the present Seaside Park). Beginning in 1878, dikes were constructed and the marshlands drained and filled and the waterway turned into a virtual canal to create a second harbor for a new factory district, under the auspices of P.T. Barnum.
- Burr Creek was a northerly arm of Cedar Creek that extended as far as Fairfield Avenue. In the 1940s the portion above Yacht Street was filled, and the P.T. Barnum and Evergreen apartment complexes were constructed on the new land. The creek took its name from a 17th-century settler; Burr Road (which formerly included the present Dewey Street and Briarwood Avenue) ran down to its headwaters. A westerly embayment that abuts Ellsworth Field is known as "Brewster's Cove" after Captain Caleb Brewster, whose homestead it adjoined.
- Ash Creek forms the western limit of the Black Rock neighborhood and separates it from Fairfield. In Colonial times it was known as the "Uncoway River" and formed the main harbor of Fairfield, until the construction of a causeway across it permitted access to the deeper harbor at Black Rock in the 1760s. Although numerous theories have been advanced by historians as to the origins of the name, it is likely that it comes from the red ash trees (Fraxinus pennsylvanica) that are common to this day along its banks.
- Bridgeport Bight is the collective name for that portion of Long Island Sound offshore from the city between Stratford Point in Stratford and Penfield Reef off Fairfield. In former times these waters were known to have the largest natural-growth oyster beds on the East Coast north of the Chesapeake, source of a major industry in Bridgeport in the 19th and early-20th century.

==== Islands ====
- Fayerweather Island is a 7 1/2-acre wooded island in Long Island Sound connected to Seaside Park by a seawall and forming a natural adjunct to it. The island is the site of the Black Rock Harbor Light.
- Pleasure Beach (formerly known as Steeplechase Island), is a 71-acre (sometimes) island located in Long Island Sound, to the south of city's East End, and is connected by the Long Beach sandspit to Stratford, Connecticut.
- Great Marsh Island is a 14-acre island located near the mouth of Ash Creek in the Black Rock neighborhood.
- South Island (aka 'Lovers Island')is a half-acre island in Bunnell's Pond created by dredging in the 19th century, connected to the mainland by the stone Henry Setzer Memorial Bridge. A corresponding "North Island" became a peninsula with additional dredging in the early 20th century.

==== Bodies of water ====
- Lake Forest (aka Island Brook Reservoir, elevation 165 feet) was created for municipal water supply in 1866 by damming Island Brook. In 1937, after the creation of Easton, Aspetuck, and Hemlock Reservoirs, the 71.4-acre lake had become surplus property, and the watershed lands surrounding it were laid out as a suburban housing development.
- Charcoal Pond (aka Island Brook Lagoon, elevation 154 feet) lies just below Lake Forest and was created at the same time for purposes of filtering the city's drinking water. Its surface area covers 4.5 acres.
- Bunnell's Pond (elevation 34 feet) was created in 1828 by damming the Pequonnock River to supply water power to a woolen mill that manufactured carpeting. To the south and west was a mill village that was named Thatchersville, after its progenitor, Daniel Thatcher (the Bunnell family succeeded him). It became the first source of municipal drinking water in 1854. The dam gave way in a flood in 1905 and was replaced by the current structure. It covers 33.4 acres.
- Lake Success (elevation 47 feet) came into being in 1906 as part of "Powder Park," a 422-acre forested area (known today as 'Remington Woods') that was used to store gunpowder and munitions of the Remington Arms Company a safe distance away from the city's residential areas. The 25-acre lake impounds the water of Old Mill Brook.
- Stillman's Pond (elevation 21 feet) was made by damming Old Mill Brook in 1812 to power a mill operated by Wyllis Stillman that manufactured shirts for the New York City market. The dam and seven-acre pond were reconfigured when the Remington Arms Company Russian Rifle Plant was erected adjoining it in 1915. The water power at this location powered a grist mill beginning in 1652, the "old mill" commemorated in the names of Old Mill Green and Old Mill Hill.
- Pembroke Lake (elevation 8 feet) was created by P.T. Barnum in 1862 as part of his real estate development in East Bridgeport. He erected a dam across the upper reaches of the tidal, salt-water Yellow Mill Pond, causing it to fill with fresh water as a pleasant adjunct to "Lake Village," a suburban community that was laid out along Seaview Avenue between Huron Street and Ogden Street Extension. Much of this lake has been filled in for industrial development.
- Bruce Pond (elevation 16 feet) was created by damming Bruce Brook (aka Stony Brook) at the Bridgeport-Stratford line in 1889. Its main purpose was as a source of ice, cut during the winter months to cool the city's iceboxes. It formerly extended north as far as Barnum Avenue.
- Asylum Pond (elevation 26 feet) was dug out of a swampy area in the late 1860s to water cattle on what was the Town Poor Farm.
- Lily Pond (elevation 16 feet) was one of two ponds dug out of marshy ground to provide drainage with the creation of Mountain Grove Cemetery in 1849.
- Mirror Lake (aka Mummy or Mummichaug Pond—elevation sea level) was created with the first expansion of Seaside Park in 1872. It provides essential drainage to a below-sea-level portion of the park, diked and drained in the manner of a Dutch polder. Originally it was surrounded by a trotting park or racetrack for horses. The colloquial name comes from a type of minnow that could be gathered here in abundance and used for bait.
- Horse Tavern Reservoir, aka Frenchtown Reservoir, survives as an intact earthen dam and dry lake bed in Elton Rogers Park, off Kaechele Place. A similar dry lake bed (constructed by the WPA in 1933) survives in Ninety Acres Park.

==== Waterways ====
- The Pequonnock River, the most significant of Bridgeport's watercourses, is a 16.7 mile waterway that has its headwaters in the town of Monroe and, like all the city's waterways, flows downslope and south toward Long Island Sound. It is dammed above Boston/North Avenues to form Bunnell's Pond. Below the Berkshire Avenue bridge it becomes a tidal salt-water estuary. South of Stillman Street it is a navigable waterway with a dredged channel.
- The Rooster River is a stream in the western part of the city that forms part of the border between Bridgeport and Fairfield. Technically, the "Rooster River" is formed by the confluence of London Brook and Horse Tavern Brook at the rear of the Unquowa School property in Fairfield. Horse Tavern Brook, the larger of the two streams, has its source to the north of Canoe Brook Lake in Trumbull (which is formed by its waters). After flowing beneath the Trumbull Shopping Park, Horse Tavern Brook becomes known for a short stretch in the vicinity of Ox Hill in Bridgeport as "Ox Brook." Above Interstate 95, the Rooster River enters a salt marsh, becomes tidal, and becomes known as Ash Creek. In Colonial times the entire watercourse was known as the "Uncoway River;" the present name is thought to be a corruption of "Rossiter," the name of an early landowner.
- Island Brook is a stream that flows through the North End of Bridgeport that originates in Island Brook Park in Trumbull. It is dammed to impound both Lake Forest and Charcoal Pond. It flows into the Pequonnock River between Island Brook Avenue and River Street. The name is a corruption of "Ireland's Brook," so named from an early settler who resided along its banks on North Avenue.
- Old Mill Brook is formed by the confluence of two streams that flow down from the Nichols section of Trumbull. It is dammed into Success Lake, Stillman's Pond and Pembroke Lake. In its original state, it formed a tidal estuary from Boston Avenue south. It flows into Yellow Mill Pond. It takes its name from a water-powered gristmill erected on the north side of Boston Avenue in 1652.
- Bruce Brook has its source in the North End of Stratford, and forms a portion of Bridgeport's border with the Town of Stratford. It is dammed into Bruce Pond just above the New Haven Railroad tracks. It flows into Johnson's Creek immediately to the south of Lordship Boulevard. The stream takes its name from a Scottish settler who resided on the site of St. Michael's Cemetery in the early 19th century; prior to that time the stream was known as "Stony Brook."

== Parks ==
The "Park City" now has these parks:

- Alice Street Lot, located on Alice Street
- Baldwin Plaza, on Broad Street
- Beardsley Park, located between East Main Street, Noble Avenue, and the Pequonnock River, an idealized rural landscape designed by Frederick Law Olmsted in 1878
- B.J. Brown Park, at the intersection of Oak Street Extension and Madison Avenue. B.J. Brown Park is also known as Beechwood Park.
- Bull's Head Park, at the intersection of Madison Avenue and Washington Avenue, adjacent to the Thomas Merton Center.
- Cal Ripken Field, a baseball diamond named in honor of baseball great, Cal Ripken Jr.
- Clinton Park Militia Grounds, North and Brooklawn Avenues—Located at the center of what was the village of Stratfield, this one-acre site was deeded to the Town of Fairfield in 1666
- Ellsworth Field, on Ellsworth and Brewster Streets
- Fairchild Memorial Park, an old-growth forest left in its natural state, located on Trumbull Road
- Freedom Field, at Luis Muñoz Marín School, off Boston Avenue and Pembroke Street.
- Glenwood Park, features tennis courts, the Wonderland of Ice, and Pequonnock River frontage
- Gold Park, at the intersection of Gold Street and Main Street in Downtown Bridgeport.
- Goosetown Park (aka Goosetown Green), Wood Avenue at Wade Street
- Hedges Field, Home of the Warren Harding High School Presidents, used for track, soccer and football.
- Jessup Park, includes tennis courts off Jefferson Street across from Newfield Park
- James Brown Park (Waterview Park), located on Waterview Avenue and Yellow Mill Pond
- Johnson Oak Park on Logan Street (now occupied by the Tisdale Elementary School)
- Kennedy Stadium, Home of the Central High School Hilltoppers
- Knowlton Park, on Knowlton Street between Hicks Street and Maple Street.
- Lafayette Park (aka Nanny Goat Park), located on Oak Street
- Longfellow Park, on St. Stephens Road
- Marina Park, situated between Marina Park Circle and Waldemere Avenue
- McLevy Green, Main, State, Broad, and Bank Streets, the city's earliest "urban" park (1806) and focal point of the business district
- Newfield/Jessup Park located on Newfield Avenue has a playground
- Old Mill Green (aka Pembroke Park), a Colonial common dating back to 1717, Boston Avenue between East Main and Hallett Streets
- Pleasure Beach, natural barrier beach accessible by ferry from the foot of Seaview Avenue, summer months only
- Perry J. Pilotti Field, a baseball diamond located within Veterans Memorial Park
- Puglio Park on Madison Avenue contains the North Branch Library
- Roberto Clemente Field, specially named baseball diamond located at Seaside Park
- Elton Rogers Park, nature preserve on Frenchtown and Old Town Roads
- Russo Park, off West Avenue between Fairfield Avenue and Washington Avenue
- Seaside Park, 'First waterfront rural park in America,' designed by Olmsted, Vaux, and Viele, creators of New York's Central Park, in 1866; with baseball/softball/soccer fields, fishing areas, picnic areas, playgrounds, mile-long groomed beach and swimming, and boat launch, stretching from Bridgeport Harbor to Black Rock Harbor
- Saint Mary's-By-the-Sea, waterfront promenade located on Grovers Avenue
- Success Park on Granfield Avenue
- Svihra Park on Ezra Street between Fairview Avenue and Sid Green Way
- Upchurch Park on Hallett Street
- Wood Park on Wood Avenue
- Veteran's Memorial Park, formerly, 90 Acres Park, runs between Park and Madison Avenues in the North End, woodland nature preserve
- Washington Park, 1851 formal residential square with historic bandstand, located on East Washington, Noble, Barnum Avenues and Kossuth Street
- Waterfront Park, constructed on wooden piers, located on Water Street Downtown
- Went Field Park on Wordin Avenue (play area, Baseball/softball) was the site of Barnum's Circus winter quarters until 1927
- West Side 2 Park located on Bostwick Avenue
- W.L. Phillips Park, includes baseball diamond, basketball courts and playground at Trumbull Gardens on Trumbull Avenue

== Neighborhoods ==
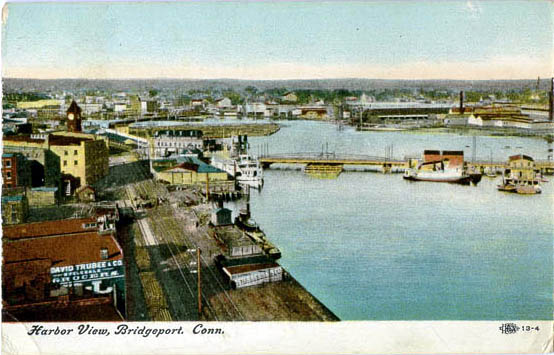
Historical postcard showing Bridgeport Harbor

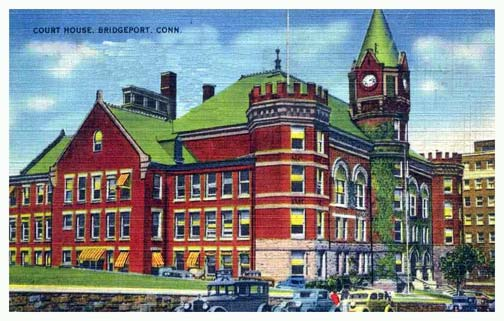
1941 postcard showing Fairfield County Courthouse in Bridgeport

Bridgeport comprises eight major subdivisions, most of which are divided into smaller neighborhoods:

- Downtown Bridgeport is the site of the original seaport village of "Newfield" that began to develop in the 1760s and became an important regional center of commerce in the post-Revolutionary period (‘Newfield' was renamed ‘Bridgeport' in the year 1800). Downtown is bounded on the east by the Pequonnock River and Bridgeport Harbor; on the north and west by the Route 25-8 Expressway (Col. Henry Mucci Highway); and on the south by Interstate 95 (Connecticut Turnpike).
- The East Side, known in the 19th century as East Bridgeport, is the area between Yellow Mill Pond/Old Mill Brook and the Pequonnock River. In the pre-Revolutionary times the portion south of the railroad tracks was Newpasture Point (like Newfield, one of the common fields of the town of Stratford), and the area north of the tracks up to Boston Avenue (developed by P.T. Barnum and William H. Noble beginning in 1850) was Pembroke City, ‘Pembroke' being a corruption of ‘Pann Brook,' after the Pann family of Indians (also dating back to 17th-century deeds). "Pann" in the Quripi language refers to the waterfall located where Boston Avenue crosses Old Mill Brook. From Boston Avenue north to Beardsley Park and the intersection of Huntington Turnpike and East Main Street was laid out in the first years of the 20th century as Beardsley Park Slope, a calculated reference to the Park Slope section of Brooklyn, at that time the most exclusive residential precinct in America. The territory from the Huntington/East Main intersection north to the Trumbull line was known for generations as Briarwood, after the 325-acre farm of the Thompson family that fronted on Huntington Turnpike. In recent decades the name Treeland (after the garden center that was one of the neighborhood's first businesses) has come into common use. Collectively, these last two neighborhoods comprise the Upper East Side.
- The East End is that part of the city to the east of Yellow Mill Pond and Old Mill Creek, the territory annexed from Stratford in 1889. It is subdivided into Newfield (south of Stratford Avenue and west of Blackman's Creek [an arm of Johnson's Creek that adjoins Central Avenue]); East End Proper (north of Stratford Avenue and east of Blackman's Creek up to the New Haven railroad tracks); Old Mill Hill (north of the railroad tracks to Granfield Avenue/Stewart Street); and Success (north of Granfield/Stewart and including much of the present Remington Woods), which is a Native American name in use since the 17th century.
- The South End is that section of the city south of State Street and east of Went Field that abuts Downtown. Since the filling in of a salt marsh and tidal flats to the west of Barnum Dyke after 1919, Fayerweather Island was more-or-less annexed to the South End from Black Rock, with which it was historically associated. The exclusive residential district south of Atlantic Street (now the University of Bridgeport campus) was long known as Marina Park (named for P.T. Barnum's palatial residence) to distinguish itself from the working-class blocks to the north. The blocks around the intersection of Main and Whiting Streets once comprised a village of free people of color called in its early days (1821–47) "Ethiope," and, later (1847-late 1800s) "Liberia." Today this historic community is widely known as Little Liberia.
- The area now known collectively as The Hollow is an amalgamation of several historic communities. Golden Hill was the well-to-do neighborhood (largely obliterated by highway construction and commercial development) that occupied the hill to the west of Pequonnock and Congress Streets. Sterling Hill was an early-19th-century Irish settlement on the north and east slopes (named not for the less-expensive metal but for its progenitor, Daniel H. Sterling). The area north of Harral Avenue to North Avenue, the Hollow Proper of the present day, was known in the 19th century by the bucolic name of Golden Valley. From Madison Avenue west to the Pequonnock River is a section still known as Bull's Head, after a tavern of that name that stood at the corner of Main and Frank Streets that was a favorite stop of cattle drovers from Monroe and Newtown in the 1790s. Island Brook is an area located to the south of North Avenue between the Pequonnock River and Housatonic Avenue. Beginning in 1786 it was the site of a village built around a grist mill that was known prior to the 1850s as "Berkshire."
- Like the East End, the West End was annexed from a neighboring town, in this case Fairfield, in 1870. It occupies that entire portion of the city between Park Avenue and the Rooster River, except for Black Rock and the upper part of the South End. Traditionally, the area to the east of Clinton Avenue was known as the West Side, while to the west of it was the West End Proper. The neighborhood bounded by North, Laurel, Capitol, and Park Avenues (and up to the present Central High School) was laid out as another elite development beginning in 1914 and was called Beach's Woods, site of the Beach family's farm that dated back to the Revolutionary War era. The part to the south of the railroad tracks and turnpike, reclaimed from salt marsh in the 1880s and '90s and demolished in the 1960s, was called Hunktown by virtue of its homogeneous Hungarian-American population. Brooklawn was, historically, entirely within the bounds of Fairfield (laid out as an expensive estate district surrounding Brooklawn Country Club in 1892). That portion of Stratfield Road that extended into Bridgeport was renamed Brooklawn Avenue as part of the development scheme. The name has come into common use in recent years to designate that section north of North Avenue and east of Park Avenue that was known in the 19th century as "Goosetown."
- Black Rock is a peninsula that extends southwesterly from the West End between Black Rock Harbor and Ash Creek. Its boundaries made it even more insular prior to the 1940s, when the filled land that now contains the P.T. Barnum housing project was a saltwater inlet known as Burr Creek. Black Rock was a part of the Town of Fairfield until 1870, and before the Civil War was one of the state's most important seaports and shipbuilding centers (the historic village became the city's first historic district). The elite enclave at the tip of the peninsula was generally known as Grover's Hill until 1926, when the Black Rock Land & Improvement Company felt that St. Mary's by-the-Sea had a better ring to it.
- The North End is bounded by Park and North Avenues, the Trumbull town line, and the Pequonnock River. Starting on the east, the hill that is bisected by Sylvan Avenue was known to previous generations as Rocky Hill. Real estate developers of the 1940s and '50s promoted it as Sylvan Crest. To the west, the next hill over, bisected by Reservoir Avenue and westerly to Island Brook, was known from the late-18th century as Chopsey Hill (after ‘John Pork Chop,' an Indian who occupied a Paugussett Indian reservation where the Trumbull Gardens housing complex is now located). During Prohibition it was still quite rural, and building lots could be procured for as little as $75. After a number of raids on illicit distillery operations the Bridgeport Herald dubbed it "Whiskey Hill." The hill to the west, extending from Island Brook to the vicinity of Wayne Street (with Summit Street appropriately at its summit), has no name in common parlance today. In the 18th and 19th century it was known as Cow Hill, an appropriate mate to Ox Hill located along Main Street above Anton Street. To the south of Cow Hill, from Salem Street down to North Avenue and west to Beachwood Park, is an area commonly known as the Old North End. Two more hills define the North End, Toilsome Hill approximately bounded by Wayne Street, Park and Capitol Avenues and Rooster River Boulevard; and Chestnut Hill (north of Toilsome Hill to the Trumbull line). And completing the circle is Lake Forest (a late-1930s suburban development of the Bridgeport Hydraulic Company's outmoded Island Brook Reservoir, which dates back to 1866), and Charcoal Pond (where the city's drinking water was once filtered).

=== Climate ===
Under the Köppen climate classification, Bridgeport has a temperate climate (Cfa), with long, hot summers, and cool to cold winters, with precipitation spread fairly evenly throughout the year. Bridgeport, like the rest of coastal Connecticut, lies in the broad transition zone between the colder continental climates of the northern United States and southern Canada to the north, and the warmer temperate and subtropical climates of the middle and south Atlantic states to the south.

The warm/hot season in Bridgeport is from mid-April through early November. Late day thundershowers are common in the hottest months (June, July, August, September), despite the mostly sunny skies. The cool/cold season is from late November though mid-March. Winter weather is far more variable than summer weather along the Connecticut coast, ranging from sunny days with higher temperatures to cold and blustery conditions with occasional snow. Like much of the Connecticut coast and nearby Long Island, NY, some of the winter precipitation is rain or a mix and rain and wet snow in Bridgeport. Bridgeport averages about 34 inches (85 cm) of snow annually, compared to inland areas like Hartford and Albany which average 45–60 inches (110–150 cm) of snow annually.

Although infrequent, tropical cyclones (hurricanes/tropical storms) have struck Connecticut and the Bridgeport metropolitan area. Hurricane landfalls have occurred along the Connecticut coast in 1903, 1938, 1944, 1954 (Carol), 1960 (Donna), Hurricane Gloria in 1985, and Hurricane Sandy in 2012.

Bridgeport lies in USDA garden zone 7a, averaging about 92 days annually with freeze. Coastal Connecticut is the broad transition zone where so-called "subtropical indicator" plants and other broadleaf evergreens can successfully be cultivated. As such, Southern Magnolias, Needle Palms, Windmill palm, Loblolly Pines, and Crape Myrtles are grown in private and public gardens. Like much of coastal Connecticut, Long Island, NY, and coastal New Jersey, the growing season is rather long in Bridgeport—averaging 210 days from April 8 to November 5 according to the National Weather Service in Bridgeport.

The average monthly temperature ranges from 31.4 °F (−0.3 °C) in January to 75.7 °F (24.3 °C) in July. The record low is −7 °F (−22 °C), set on January 22, 1984, while the record high is 103 °F (39 °C), set on July 22 in 1957 and 2011.

Precipitation averages 44.9 inches (1,140 mm) annually, and is somewhat evenly distributed throughout the year, with March and April the wettest months. Annual snowfall averages 33.6 inches (85 cm), falling almost entirely from December to March. As is typical of coastal Connecticut, snow cover does not usually last long, with an average of 33 days per winter with snow cover of at least 1 inch (2.5 cm).

Climate data for Bridgeport, Connecticut (Sikorsky Airport), 1991–2020 normals, extremes 1948–present
Month	Jan	Feb	Mar	Apr	May	Jun	Jul	Aug	Sep	Oct	Nov	Dec	Year
Record high °F (°C)	69 (21)	67 (19)	84 (29)	91 (33)	97 (36)	97 (36)	103 (39)	100 (38)	99 (37)	89 (32)	78 (26)	76 (24)	103 (39)
Mean maximum °F (°C)	57 (14)	55 (13)	65 (18)	76 (24)	85 (29)	91 (33)	94 (34)	92 (33)	86 (30)	78 (26)	68 (20)	60 (16)	95 (35)
Mean daily maximum °F (°C)	38.4 (3.6)	40.5 (4.7)	47.4 (8.6)	58.3 (14.6)	68.4 (20.2)	77.7 (25.4)	83.4 (28.6)	81.9 (27.7)	75.4 (24.1)	64.4 (18.0)	53.6 (12.0)	43.8 (6.6)	61.1 (16.2)
Daily mean °F (°C)	31.4 (−0.3)	33.1 (0.6)	39.3 (4.1)	50.0 (10.0)	60.0 (15.6)	69.6 (20.9)	75.7 (24.3)	74.5 (23.6)	67.6 (19.8)	56.4 (13.6)	46.0 (7.8)	37.0 (2.8)	53.4 (11.9)
Mean daily minimum °F (°C)	24.4 (−4.2)	25.7 (−3.5)	32.3 (0.2)	41.7 (5.4)	51.7 (10.9)	61.5 (16.4)	67.9 (19.9)	67.0 (19.4)	59.8 (15.4)	48.3 (9.1)	38.4 (3.6)	30.2 (−1.0)	45.7 (7.6)
Mean minimum °F (°C)	7 (−14)	10 (−12)	18 (−8)	30 (−1)	41 (5)	50 (10)	59 (15)	57 (14)	46 (8)	34 (1)	24 (−4)	16 (−9)	5 (−15)
Record low °F (°C)	−7 (−22)	−6 (−21)	4 (−16)	18 (−8)	31 (−1)	41 (5)	49 (9)	44 (7)	36 (2)	26 (−3)	13 (−11)	−4 (−20)	−7 (−22)
Average precipitation inches (mm)	3.18 (81)	3.12 (79)	4.09 (104)	4.16 (106)	3.58 (91)	3.77 (96)	3.32 (84)	3.98 (101)	3.96 (101)	3.84 (98)	3.11 (79)	3.98 (101)	44.09 (1,121)
Average snowfall inches (cm)	8.5 (22)	10.7 (27)	7.0 (18)	0.9 (2.3)	0 (0)	0 (0)	0 (0)	0 (0)	0 (0)	0.1 (0.25)	0.9 (2.3)	5.5 (14)	33.6 (85.85)
Average precipitation days (≥ 0.01 inch)	11.2	10.4	11.2	11.4	12.12	11.2	8.9	9.2	8.2	9.9	9.4	11.5	124.62
Average snowy days (≥ 0.1 inch)	4.5	4.2	2.6	0.3	0	0	0	0	0	0.1	0.4	2.9	15
Source: NOAA
