= Bridgeport Harbor Light =

Lighthouse in Connecticut, United States

Current light
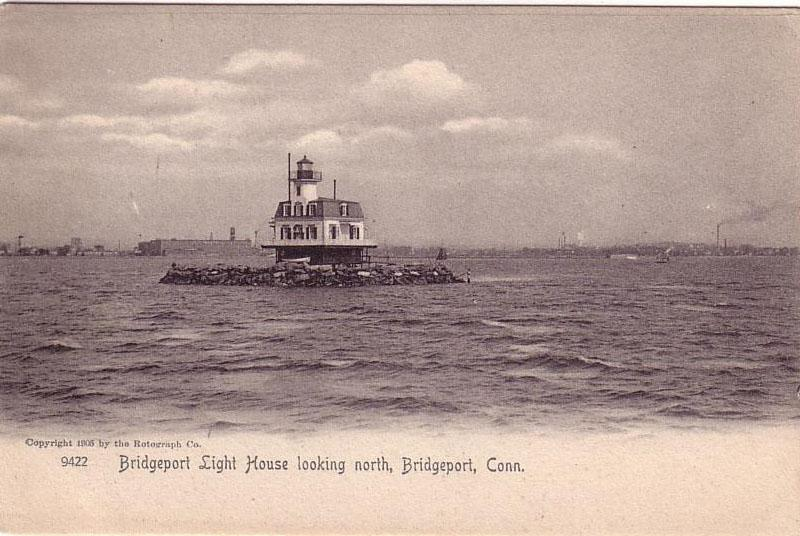
- Location: Fairfield County, Connecticut, United States
- Coordinates: 41°09′24″N 73°10′48″W

Tower
- Constructed: 1953
- Construction: concrete (foundation), metal (tower)
- Height: 52 ft (16 m)
- Shape: square skeletal tower with light
- Markings: Square (green)
- Power source: solar power
- Operator: United States Coast Guard

Light
- Focal height: 57 ft (17 m)
- Characteristic: Q G
- 1871 light
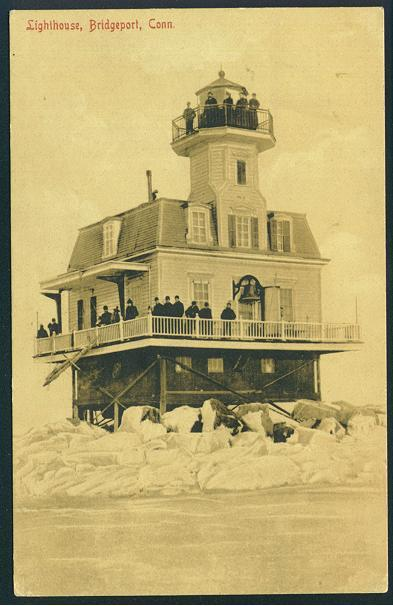
- Early picture postcard of the lighthouse
- Constructed: 1871
- Construction: structural wood (tower)
- Shape: octagonal tower atop keeper's house
- Markings: White (tower), grey (roof), black (lantern)
- First lit: November 1871
- Deactivated: 1953
- Characteristic: F R
- 1851 light
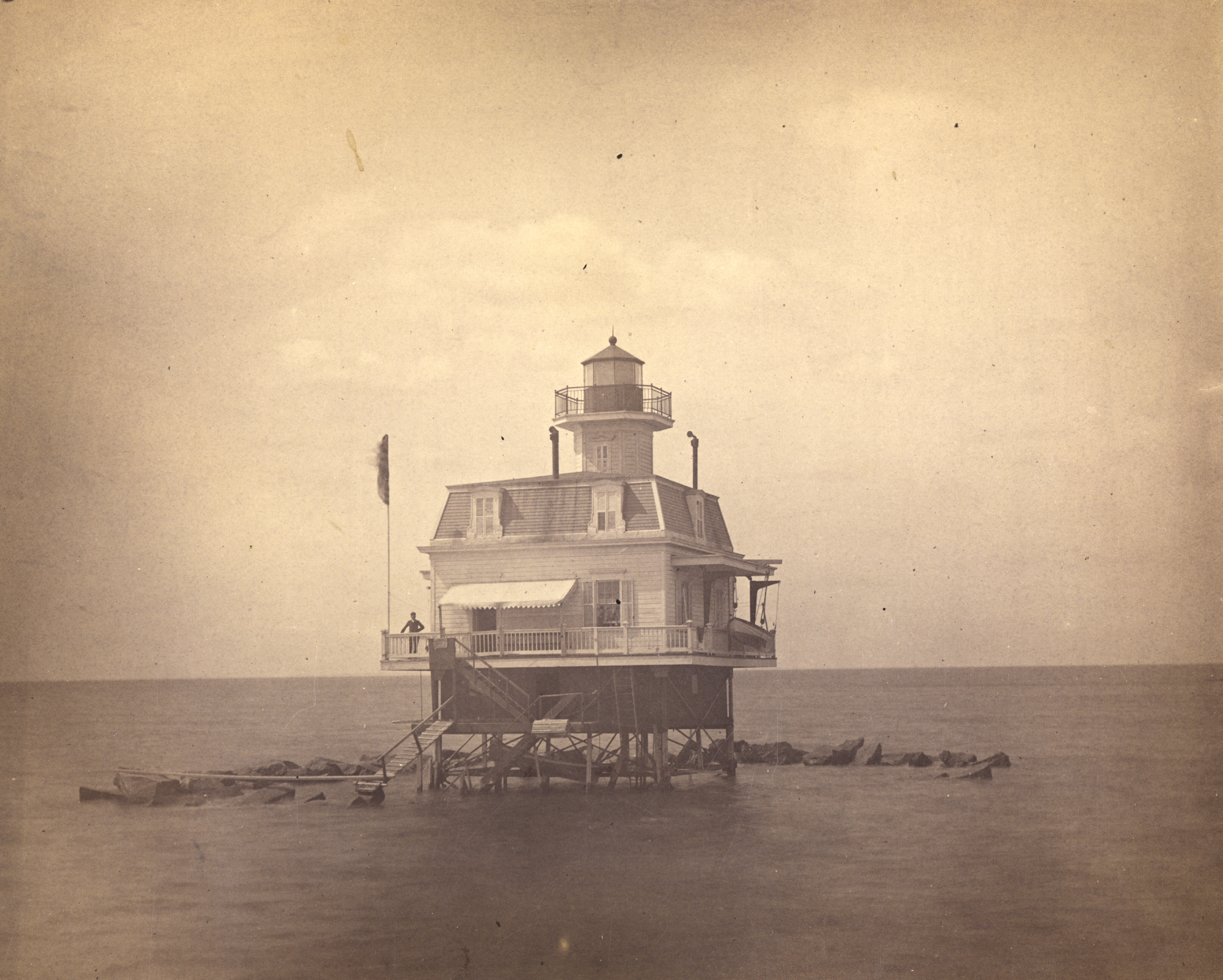
- Constructed: 1851
- Foundation: iron screw piles base
- Construction: structural wood (tower)
- Shape: octagon
- Deactivated: 1871
- Characteristic: F R

The Bridgeport Harbor Light, later the Bridgeport Harbor Lighthouse, was a lighthouse in Bridgeport, Connecticut, United States. It is located on the west side of the Bridgeport Harbor entrance and the north side of Long Island Sound. Originally constructed in 1851 and rebuilt in 1871 with a dwelling, it had a red-fixed light throughout its service life. The builder and first keeper of the light was Abraham A. McNeil who is also credited as improvising the first light for the Bridgeport Harbor in 1844. By 1953, the lighthouse was in poor condition and the United States Coast Guard opted to build a skeleton tower in its place. In the 2014 edition of the Light List Volume 1, the skeleton tower is marked as "Light 13A" with a height of 57 feet (17 m) and a visual marker of a square green dayboard with a green reflective border. The lighthouse was sold and an attempt was made to move it to serve as a monument for Connecticut's maritime history, but it was later decided to scrap the structure. The lighthouse caught fire and was destroyed during the dismantling in 1953.

== 1851 light ==
According to Waldo's History of Bridgeport and Vicinity, Volume 1, Abraham A. McNeil first set a light atop a mast to mark the Bridgeport Harbor in 1844. The next day Captain John Brooks Jr. set up his own improvised light with another boat. Constructed in 1851, the first Bridgeport Harbor Light was an octagonal tower on a box-like structure stood on iron piles. The exact details of its construction are not recorded and there is no complete description, but it is known to have had a fixed red light. Waldo identifies Abraham A. McNeil as the builder of the light. The light had no keeper's quarters and was only accessible by boat. By 1870, a new lighthouse was needed, partly because of the increased maritime traffic.

== 1871 lighthouse ==
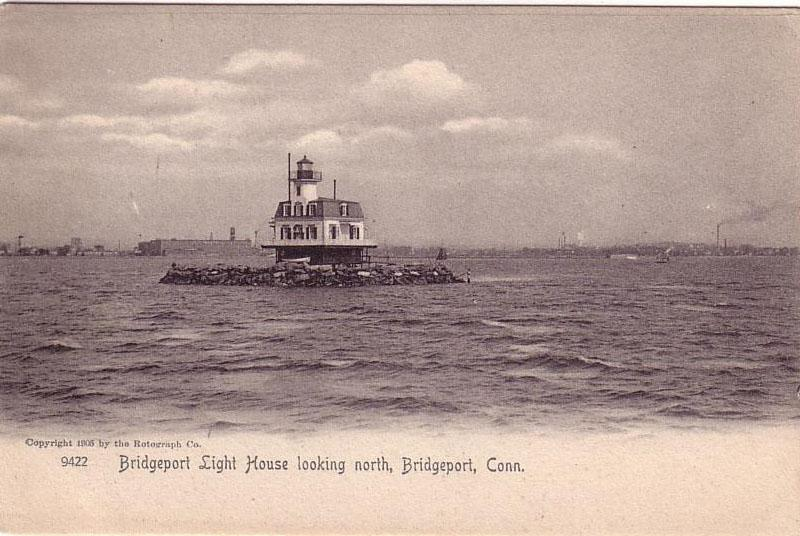
1905 postcard depicting the lighthouse

Completed in 1871, the rebuilt light had a dwelling with the attached tower containing a fourth-order Fresnel lens. It retained the original fixed red light, but also included a fog bell. In 1900, the lighthouse was identified in the Light List as having a red screw-pile structure, a white tower and dwelling with a slate-gray Mansard roof topped with a black lantern. The lighthouse had a fog signal that sounded every 15 seconds and was operated by machinery. Although the focal height of the light is unlisted, the center of the light stood 34 ft (10 m) above the ground.

In 1873, a request for $5,500, equivalent to $148,000 in 2025 was submitted to Congress for the "additional protection" of the "screw-pile light house". During the first session of the 43rd Congress, the $5,500 was appropriated for the lighthouse. In 1898, during the Spanish–American War the lighthouse was equipped with 10-inch guns to ward off enemy attacks, making it one of the few armed American lighthouses in history. These guns never saw action as there was no attack on the coast. In 1920, $5925 was estimated to be needed for riprap protection.

By 1953, the lighthouse was in poor condition and the U.S. Coast Guard opted to replace it with a skeleton tower. The lighthouse was sold to the Fairfield Dock Company, which initially planned to move it ashore, but it was later decided to dismantle and scrap it. A plan existed to move the lighthouse ashore to a city park as a monument to Connecticut's maritime heritage, but the location could not be agreed upon. (Note: Harrison states that a local lighthouse lover brought the lighthouse and planned to move it ashore and writes that it burned during the dismantling. This account is different from D'Entremont, who details the purchaser as the Fairfield Dock Company, the proposed move and the later decision to scrap it.)

== Skeleton tower ==
The skeleton tower constructed from 1953 continues to serve Bridgeport Harbor. In the 2014 edition of the Light List Volume 1, the skeleton tower is marked as "Light 13A" with a height of 57 feet (17 m) and a visual marker of a square green dayboard with a green reflective border.

== List of keepers ==
Name	Year	Reference	Service Notes
Abraham A. McNeil; Charles Hubbell McNeil (assistant)	1851–1873; 1851–1871		Abraham A. McNeil is credited as first lighting the Bridgeport Harbor in 1844 and constructing the light.
Waldo Lester	1873		
Charles Hubbell (McNeil?); Frederick Raymond (assistant)	1874–1875; 1875–1876		
Joseph H. Prindle (Unknown position)	1875–1876		
S. Adolphus McNeil; Edward Burton (assistant)	1876–1901; 1876–1882		
Ole Anderson	1901–1903		
Samuel Wright	1903- Unknown (at least 1907)		
A. G. Baldwin	Around 1915		Rescued C. A. Strat from drowning.
J. A. Miller	Around 1917		
Rudolph Iten	Around 1920		
William Hardwick	Around 1920		Received a letter of commendation from Commerce Secretary Herbert Hoover for his rescue, saving seven.
Daniel McCoart	1921–1945		Involved in at least two rescues.
Ralph Lutinski (Coast Guard)	Unknown - 1953		
Delphin Merritt (Coast Guard)	Unknown - 1953		
Michael J. Walsh, Jr. (Coast Guard)	Unknown - 1953		
Edward J. Sampel (Coast Guard)	Unknown - 1953		
Otto E. Hessmar (Coast Guard)	Unknown - 1953		

== See also ==
- List of lighthouses in the United States
- List of lighthouses in Connecticut
- History of Bridgeport, Connecticut
- Tongue Point Light marks the western side between the inner and outer harbor areas of Bridgeport Harbor.
- Black Rock Harbor Light marks the entrance to the Black Rock Harbor just to the west of Bridgeport Harbor.

== Notes ==
- Page 166 of The Field Guide to Lighthouses of the New England Coast: 150 Destinations in Maine, Massachusetts, Rhode Island, Connecticut misidentifies a photo of the Tongue Point Light as the Bridgeport Harbor Light.
