= Bassick High School =

Location
- 205 Broad Street; Bridgeport, Connecticut 06604; United States; 41°09′54″N 73°11′11″W

Information
- Type: Public
- Established: 1934 (92 years ago)
- CEEB code: 070045
- Principal: Joseph Raiola
- Teaching staff: 62.50 (FTE)
- Enrollment: 1,033 (2023-2024)
- Student to teacher ratio: 16.53
- Colors: Green and white
- Mascot: Lions
- Website: bassick.bridgeportedu.net

Bassick High School is a public high school located in Bridgeport, Connecticut.

== History ==
In 1924, the Bassick family home was demolished to begin construction for a school. The E & F Construction Company was awarded the contract after submitting a bid for $692,946. Architect Ernest G. Southey created a Georgian style plan set back 100 feet from Fairfield Avenue leaving "ample room to the south of the school for a large athletic field."

Bassick Junior High School opened in 1929 with 1,034 students in grades seven through nine and was converted to a senior high school starting in 1934, although seniors did not graduate Bassick until 1936. A new addition was built in 1968 at a cost of $3.5 million.

== Academics ==
As of 2006, the school administration planned to continue developing "Achievement and Career Academies" within the school. "These Academies will create small communities of learners that will personalize the educational experience for each student and provide needed support for increased levels of academic achievement," according to the Federal Department of Education Web site. "Through an Advisory Program, Bassick will ensure that each student is known well by at least one adult member of the school community." The program was also to integrate reading and mathematics instruction.

In the federal 2006 fiscal year, The U.S. Department of Education awarded the school $476,753 for a five-year "Smaller Learning Communities" grant. Since that point, Bassick High School has cycled through various academic models.

== Athletics ==
The school is a former member of the FCIAC conference, having departed for the Constitution State Conference in 2015. They have since left the CSC and now compete as an independent school. Bassick High School offers various athletic teams for both boys and girls. The Bassick Lions compete in football, soccer, cross country, track, basketball, volleyball, baseball, and softball, and there is also an active cheer squad. Bassick's basketball team boasts several great successes, including the 1940 and 1989 Connecticut state championships, and three more finals appearances, in 1939, 2000 and 2004. More recently, the team qualified for the semifinals of the 2015 Connecticut state championship, before losing to Bunnell High School of Stratford.

== Notable alumni ==
- Kevin Belcher, former NFL player
- Angel Echevarria, Class of 1989, former MLB player (Colorado Rockies, Milwaukee Brewers, Chicago Cubs)
- Philip Nastu, former MLB player (San Francisco Giants)
- Daniel Trust, Rwandan genocide survivor, motivational speaker, and founder of the Daniel Trust Foundation
- Darryl Sims, former National Football League player
