= Ernest G. Southey =

American architect (1874 - 1945)

- Born: January 23, 1874
- Died: November 20, 1945 (aged 71); Bridgeport, Connecticut
- Occupation: Architect
- Buildings: Bassick High School

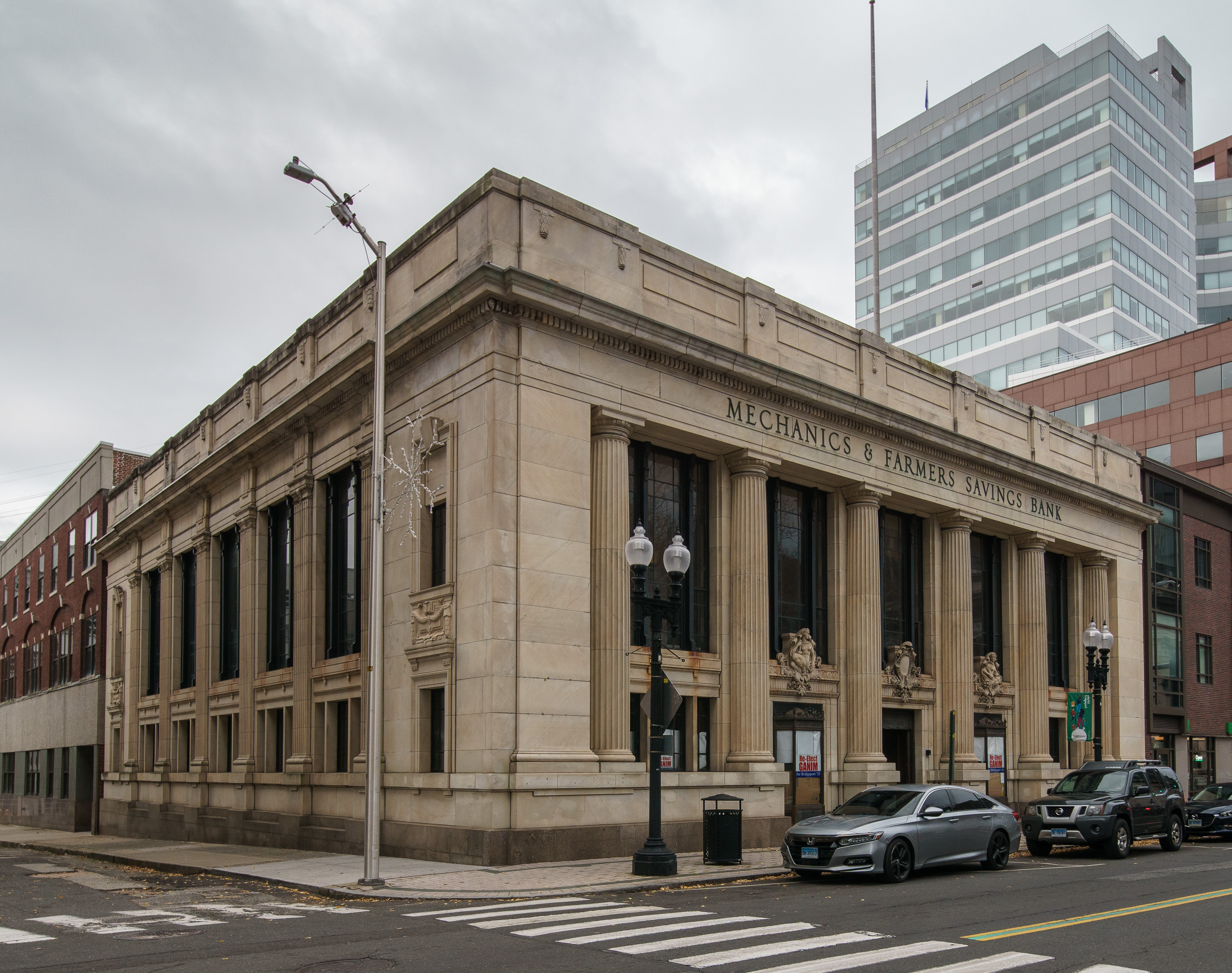
The Mechanics and Farmers Savings Bank Building in Bridgeport, designed by Southey in the Neoclassical style and completed in 1930

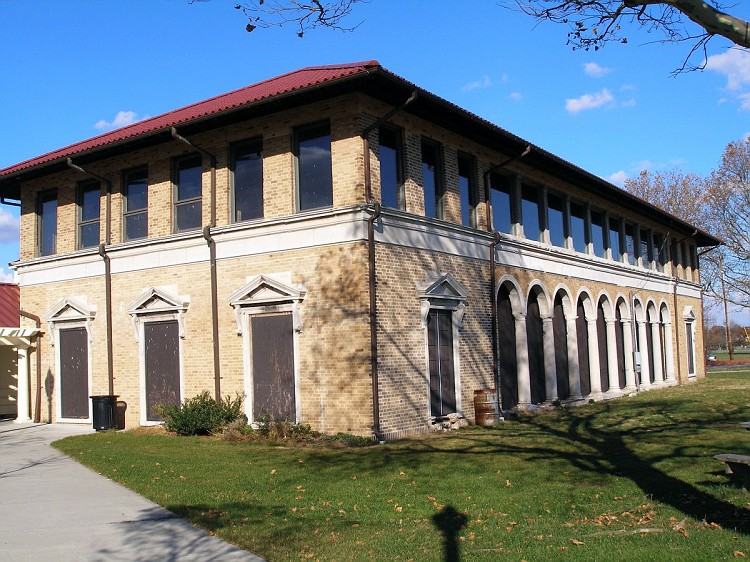
The casino in Seaside Park, designed by Southey in the Italian Renaissance Revival style and completed in 1918

Ernest G. Southey (January 23, 1874 - November 20, 1945) was an American architect in practice in Bridgeport, Connecticut, during the first half of the twentieth century.

== Life and career ==
Ernest Guy Southey was born January 23, 1874. His practice spanned almost the entire first half of the twentieth century. During that period he designed churches, commercial buildings, private homes and the Bassick High School (1929). He was a member of the American Institute of Architects from 1916, and was cited for his architectural achievement during Bridgeport's centennial celebration in 1931.

In 1918 Southey was married to Lena Timoney, née Dean. Her first husband, with whom she had had a son, had died in 1912. From 1936 until the outbreak of World War II Southey worked in partnership with his stepson, David Ludgate Southey, who had been educated at the University of Pennsylvania. Ernest Southey died November 20, 1945, and David Southey, who had returned to Bridgeport, practiced independently until 1952. He then joined the architectural staff of the Bureau of Medicine and Surgery, Department of the Navy. He lived and worked in Washington, DC, until his death in 1974.

Several of his designs contribute to historic districts listed on the United States National Register of Historic Places.

== Architectural works ==
- 1902 — William N. Beardsley house, Park Ave, Bridgeport
  - A contributing property to the NRHP-listed Marina Park Historic District.
- 1902 — Danbury High School, White St, Danbury
  - Demolished.
- 1910 — Bijou Theatre, Fairfield Ave, Bridgeport
- 1910 — William L. Taylor house, Soundview Rd, Westport
  - A contributing property to the NRHP-listed Compo–Owenoke Historic District.
- 1913 — William B. Leigh house, Waldemere Ave, Bridgeport
  - As of 2025, Waldemere Hall of the University of Bridgeport.
- 1914 — City Savings Bank Building, Main St, Bridgeport
- 1915 — Dudley M. Morris House, Linden Ave, Bridgeport
  - As of 2025, Wistaria Hall of the University of Bridgeport.
- 1918 — Casino, Seaside Park, Bridgeport, Connecticut
- 1924 — Bridgeport Gas Light Building, Main St, Bridgeport
- 1924 — Morris Plan Bank Building, Bank St, Bridgeport
- 1925 — Alexander L. DeLaney house, Lyon Ter, Bridgeport
  - A contributing property to the NRHP-listed Golden Hill Historic District.
- 1929 — Bassick High School, Fairfield Ave, Bridgeport
- 1930 — Mechanics and Farmers Savings Bank Building, Main St, Bridgeport
  - A contributing property to the NRHP-listed Bridgeport Downtown South Historic District.
- 1931 — Bridgeport Hydraulic Building, Main St, Bridgeport
  - A contributing property to the NRHP-listed Bridgeport Downtown South Historic District.
