= Thomas Wheeler House =

Historic house in Connecticut, United States

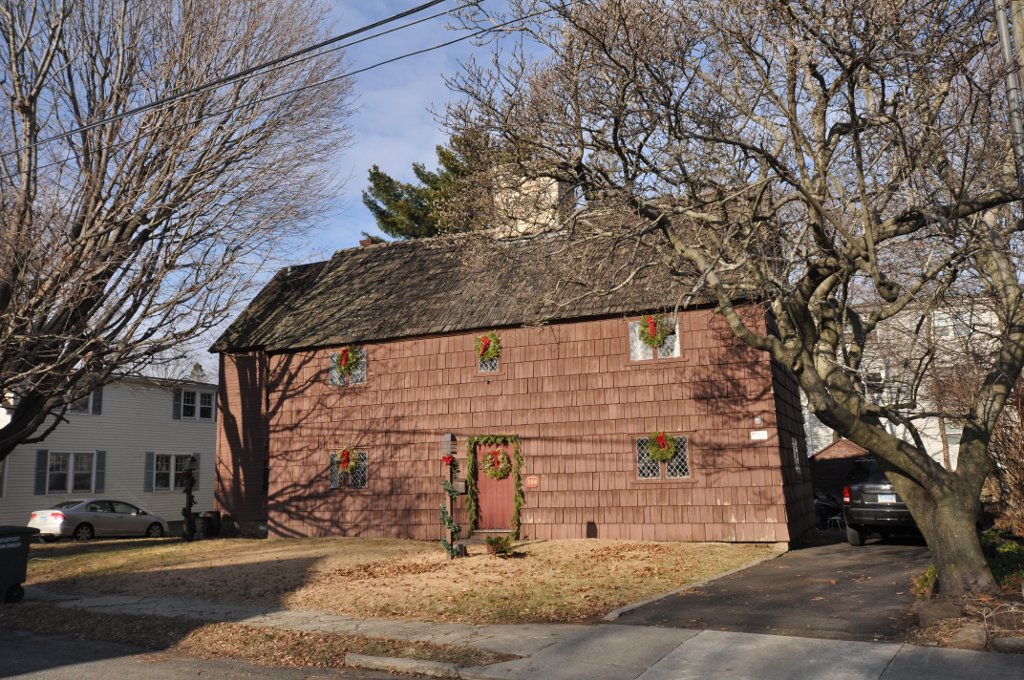
The Wheeler House

The Thomas Wheeler House is a historic Colonial home located at 266 Brewster Street, in the village of Black Rock Harbor in Bridgeport, Connecticut.The core of the house may date to as early as 1680. Thomas Wheeler was Black Rock's first white settler. The house, Bridgeport's oldest, is located near the Fayerweather Boat Yard. The roof pitch is in excess of 60 degrees; the framing timbers (including a 22-inch-wide summer beam) are exposed on the interior. Abbot Lowell Cummings, Professor Emeritus, American Art, Yale University, observed the restoration work done in the late 1980s, when carpenters uncovered an old casement window frame in a wall during restoration work. The house was recently threatened by the encroachment of a large development in 2006. The Wheeler House is listed on the National Register of Historic Places within the Black Rock Historic District added on March 15, 1979.

== See also ==
- History of Bridgeport, Connecticut
- List of the oldest buildings in Connecticut
