= Tongue Point Light =

Tongue Point Light Bridgeport Breakwater
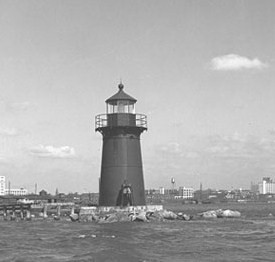
- Bridgeport Breakwater Light
- Location: Bridgeport Harbor; Connecticut; United States
- Coordinates: 41°09′59.8″N 73°10′39″W

Tower
- Constructed: 1895
- Foundation: reinforced concrete pier
- Construction: cast iron tower
- Automated: 1954
- Height: 31 ft (9.4 m)
- Shape: conical tower with balcony and lantern
- Markings: black tower and lantern
- Operator: Wisvest-Connecticut LLC
- Heritage: National Register of Historic Places listed place

Light
- Focal height: 31 ft (9.4 m)
- Lens: Sixth order Fresnel lens (original), 155 mm lens (current)
- Range: 5 nautical miles (9.3 km; 5.8 mi)
- Characteristic: Fl G 4s.
- Tongue Point Lighthouse
- U.S. National Register of Historic Places
- Area: less than one acre
- Built: 1894
- MPS: Operating Lighthouses in Connecticut MPS
- NRHP reference No.: 89001478
- Added to NRHP: May 29, 1990

Tongue Point Light Lighthouse, also known as Bridgeport Breakwater or Bug Light, is a lighthouse on the west side of the Bridgeport Harbor entrance, in the city of Bridgeport, Connecticut in the United States. Built in 1891 and moved to its present location in 1919, it was instrumental in the development of the city's inner harbor as a transshipment point, Connecticut rail and water freight transport systems. It was added to the National Register of Historic Places in 1990.

== Description ==
The Tongue Point Light stands on a projection on the boundary between Bridgeport's inner and outer harbor areas, just east of a power station. It is set on a stone pedestal 10 feet (3.0 m) tall, its square cross section shrinking from 21-foot (6.4 m) sides at the base to 15-foot (4.6 m) sides at the top. The lighthouse is a conical cast iron structure with a 12-foot (3.7 m) diameter at the base, rising 22 feet (6.7 m) to the lantern deck. A heavy metal door provides access on the west side. The interior includes a winding staircase along the outer walls, which leads to a watch room below the lantern deck. The watch room is supported by a central column, with floors made of heavy metal panels. A ladder provides access from the watch room to the lantern deck. The floor of the lantern deck includes eight portholes, providing illumination from the light to the room below.

== History ==
During Bridgeport's industrial growth of the late 19th century, several projects were undertaken to improve access for water-borne freight. In the 1870s the main channel to the downtown port area was widened, and in 1891 a breakwater was extending from Tongue Point to provide additional shelter. The lighthouse was originally built at the end of that breakwater, about 500 feet (150 m) offshore. In 1919, the shipping channel was widened again, and the lighthouse was moved to its present location. The light was automated in 1954. In 1967, the Coast Guard planned to remove the lighthouse but local boaters protested. The lighthouse remains an active aid to navigation. A modern optic replaced the original sixth order Fresnel lens in 1988.

In 1990 Tongue Point Light was added to the National Register of Historic Places under reference number 89001478.

== See also ==
- List of lighthouses in Connecticut
- List of lighthouses in the United States
- History of Bridgeport, Connecticut
- Bridgeport Harbor Light
- Black Rock Harbor Light
- National Register of Historic Places listings in Bridgeport, Connecticut
