= Darryl Sims =

American football player (born 1961)

No. 99, 91
- Position: Defensive end

Personal information
- Born: July 23, 1961 (age 65); Winston-Salem, North Carolina, U.S.
- Listed height: 6 ft 3 in (1.91 m)
- Listed weight: 278 lb (126 kg)

Career information
- High school: Bassick (Bridgeport, Connecticut)
- College: Wisconsin
- NFL draft: 1985: 1st round, 20th overall pick

Career history
- Pittsburgh Steelers (1985–1986); Cleveland Browns (1987–1988)

Awards and highlights
- 2× First-team All-Big Ten (1982, 1984)

Career NFL statistics
- Sacks: 3
- Fumble recoveries: 1
- Stats at Pro Football Reference

Darryl Sims (born June 23, 1961) is an American athletic administrator and former football player. A standout defensive tackle for the Wisconsin Badgers, he played four seasons in the National Football League (NFL) for the Pittsburgh Steelers and Cleveland Browns. After leading the athletic program at the University of Wisconsin-Oshkosh for over a decade, Simms now serves as director of the W Club at the University of Wisconsin–Madison.

== Early life ==
Sims said his mother encouraged him to get involved with sports as a way to stay out of trouble. After two years of high school in Winston-Salem, North Carolina, his mother sent him to live with his uncle in Connecticut. Sims graduated from Bassick High School in Bridgeport, Connecticut. Sims chose to play college football for the Wisconsin Badgers, as did his high school teammate Kevin Belcher the following year.

== Playing career ==
Playing for coach Dave McClain at Wisconsin in 1980, 1981, 1982, and 1984 (he was academically ineligible in 1983), Sims finished 10th in school history with 39 career tackles for loss and tied for 8th with 17 career sacks. His single-season mark of 24 tackles for loss in 1982 is the third-best single-season number in Wisconsin history. He was a first team All-Big Ten selection in 1981, 1982, and 1984.

Sims registered four tackles, including two for loss, in a 21-14 win at Camp Randall Stadium against Bo Schembechler's No. 1-ranked Michigan Wolverines on September 12, 1981. Sims set what was then the school record for sack yardage in a single game (37 yards vs. Northwestern in 1982) and ended his career tied with Tim Jordan for fifth in sacks in a season (11 in 1982). When Sims left the Badgers, he ranked second in program history for most sacks, earning him the nickname "Sack Man."

On January 13, 1985, Sims was named defensive MVP of the Japan Bowl, a college football all-star game played that year at Yokohama Stadium, after recording three combined sacks of Boston College's Doug Flutie and Ohio State's Mike Tomczak. News reports of the game said that Flutie, who won that season's Heisman Trophy, "came under constant pressure" from Sims. Flutie said the defensive line led by Sims was one of the toughest pass rushes he had ever faced in his career. Sims played for the Terry Donahue-coached West, which won 28-14 over the Johnny Majors-coached East with California's Gale Gilbert winning the game's overall MVP.

Sims helped lead the 1984 Badgers to the Hall of Fame Bowl. Overall, 16 players from that year's Badgers team went on to play in the NFL, and Sims was one of the team's three first-round draft picks, along with Al Toon and Richard Johnson.

He was selected by the Steelers as the 20th overall pick of the 1985 NFL draft. The day Sims was drafted, he told news reporters that he expected to be drafted in the second round.

His NFL career lasted four seasons, playing for Chuck Noll’s Pittsburgh Steelers in 1985 and 1986 and Marty Schottenheimer‘s Cleveland Browns in 1987 and 1988. In his two seasons with the Steelers, he recorded 18 tackles and two sacks, earning $924,000 in that span. Art Rooney Jr., who led the Steelers scouting department when Sims was drafted, said the selection of Sims was a "bad mistake."

== Coaching career ==
After his playing career, Sims coached at the University of Wisconsin-Oshkosh as well as in NFL Europe for three different teams: assistant coach of the Amsterdam Admirals from 2000 to 2005, head coach of the Cologne Centurions in 2006, and assistant coach of the Berlin Thunder in 2007. His 2005 Amsterdam Admirals won the World Bowl XIII.

He also was assistant defensive line coach with the Oakland Raiders in 2006 under head coach Art Shell.

== Administration career ==
Beginning in 2010, Sims served as Wisconsin–Oshkosh Titans athletic director and later became assistant chancellor for intercollegiate athletics. Under his tenure, the school won 10 national championships as well as 40 Wisconsin Intercollegiate Athletic Conference (WAIC) regular season titles and 15 tournament titles. In his role, Sims oversaw the expansion of the program in which the university added three intercollegiate varsity sports: women's wrestling, women's flag football, and men's soccer. He also helped improve facilities at UW-Oshkosh, including the Mary Beth Nienhaus Softball Complex, the Kolf Sports Center, the installation of artificial turf at J.J. Keller Field at Titan Stadium, and the resurfacing of the outdoor track at the Oshkosh Sports Complex.

Academically under Sims, Oshkosh athletes earned 30 College Sports Communicators Academic All-America honors and 40 were named WIAC Scholar-Athletes.

In September 2026, Sims announced he was leaving Oshkosh to become the director of the Wisconsin Badgers athletics W Club, replacing Chris Solinsky. The W Club is a membership group that formed in 1948 and serves thousands of alumni athletes.

== Personal life ==
Sims received a bachelor's degree in Speech Communication in 2003 and a master's degree in Educational Leadership in 2005, both from Oshkosh. A profile published in the Milwaukee Journal Sentinel in 2011 noted that he had his wife Carla had been married for 14 years.
