= Black Rock Historic District =

Historic district in Connecticut, United States

- U.S. National Register of Historic Places
- U.S. Historic district
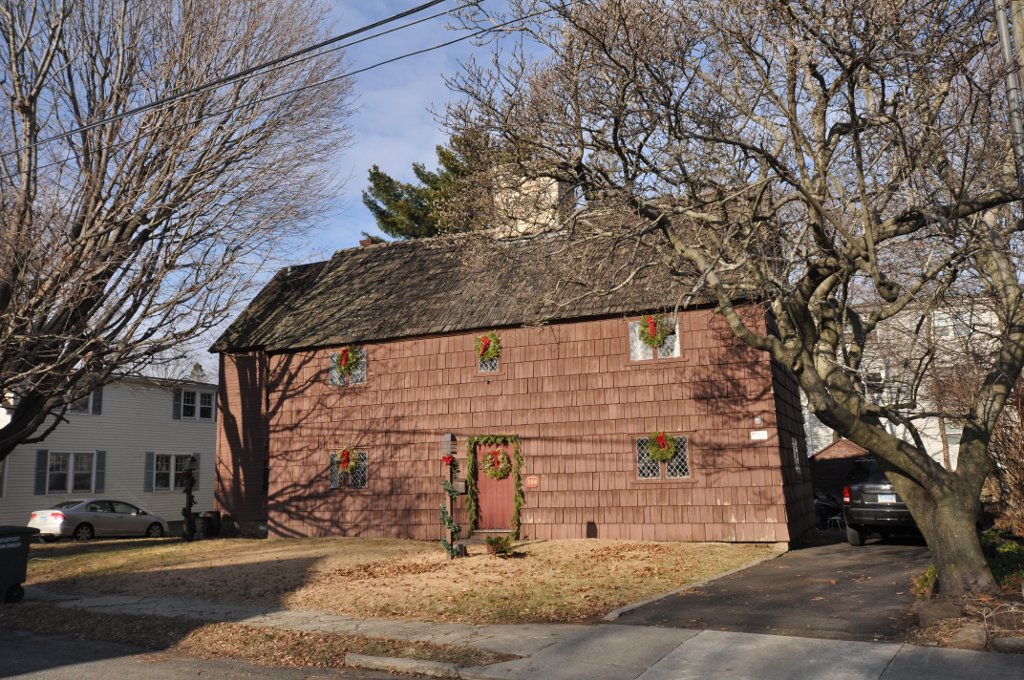
- Wheeler House, on Brewster Street

- Location within Connecticut Location within the United States
- Location: Roughly bounded by Black Rock Harbor, Grovers Avenue, Beacon and Prescott Streets, Bridgeport, Connecticut
- Coordinates: 41°9′11″N 73°13′17″W
- Area: 30.2 acres (12.2 ha)
- Built: 1644-2000
- Architect: Multiple
- Architectural style: Colonial, Federal, Greek Revival, Italian Villa, Second Empire, Queen Anne
- NRHP reference No.: 79002658
- Added to NRHP: March 15, 1979

The Black Rock Historic District is a predominantly residential historic district in the Black Rock section of Bridgeport, Connecticut. It was listed on the National Register of Historic Places in 1979. At that time it included 109 contributing buildings. The historic district surrounds at the upper reaches of Black Rock Harbor.

Black Rock was settled in 1644, and developed as a major shipping and trading center in the 1760s after a bridge over Ash Creek created a direct road connection to Fairfield Center. It was the third largest port in Connecticut at the time of the American Revolutionary War, and became the official Port of Entry for Fairfield County in 1790. The village was originally part of Fairfield before being annexed to Bridgeport in 1870. By that time the port had declined in importance. In subsequent years the once-rural village was gradually incorporated into the city's urban fabric. That portion of the district to the south of Bartram Avenue (88 buildings) is also a City of Bridgeport Local Historic District, where changes to a building's exterior that are visible from a public right-of-way must receive a Certificate of Appropriateness from the Historic District Commission.

The district includes the Thomas Wheeler Sr. House (1644–80), considered the fourth-oldest house in Connecticut, at 266 Brewster Street. Other important structures include the Gershom Sturges/Benjamin Penfield House (1803–1836) at 105 Beacon Street, an example of the Greek Revival style; the Wolcott Chauncey House at 150 Seabright Avenue (1769), an example of a Colonial "Cape" house and birthplace of Commodore Isaac Chauncey; the Captain William Hall House at 87 Ellsworth Street (1856), a Gothic-Italianate villa in the "Hudson River Bracketed" mode and home to a major shipyard owner; and the Gould Brothers House at 119-21 Seabright Avenue (1868), a double-house built in the French Second Empire style for two building contractors.

== See also ==
- History of Bridgeport, Connecticut
- Black Rock Gardens Historic District
- National Register of Historic Places listings in Bridgeport, Connecticut
