= Daniel Trust =

Rwandan motivational speaker

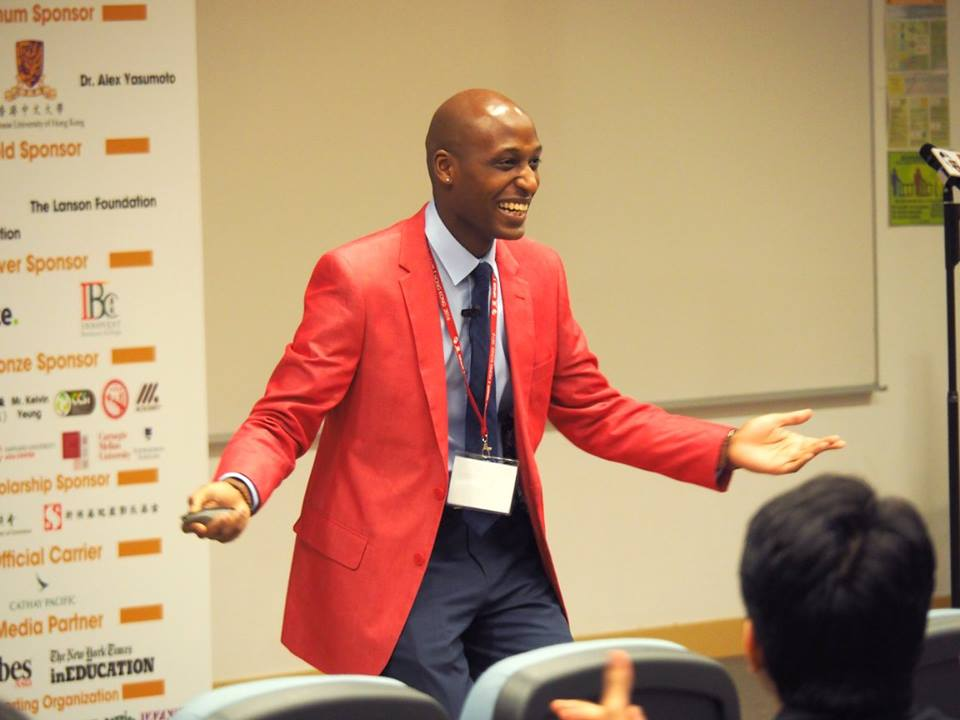
- Daniel Trust speaking at The Harvard Project for Asian and International Relations (HPAIR) Conference in Hong Kong
- Born: Daniel Ndamwizeye; March 9, 1989 (age 36); Gisenyi, Rwanda
- Education: Southern Connecticut State University (Business Management)
- Occupations: Motivational Speaker, Entrepreneur, Philanthropist, President & CEO of The Daniel Trust Foundation
- Website: Official website

Daniel Ndamwizeye (born March 9, 1989), better known in the professional world as Daniel Trust, is an international speaker, social entrepreneur and youth advocate. He is best known for being President and CEO of Daniel Trust Foundation, a non-profit organization that invests in and supports low-income students and teachers who have made a big impact in the lives of their students. Daniel is also well known for surviving the 1994 Rwandan genocide, and sharing his Coming Out story through his speaking career. Daniel has been featured on media such as News 12 Connecticut's "Our Lives," WTNH's "Connecticut Style," WFSB's "Better Connecticut," as well as the New Haven Register, Hartford Courant, Scholastic Magazine, Connecticut Magazine and Fairfield County Business Journal's "40 under 40", and Southern Connecticut State University's Alumni magazine.

== Early life and education ==
Daniel Trust was born in Gisenyi, Rwanda on 9 March 1989. Daniel's mother was Tutsi and his father was Hutu. At age 5, he witnessed his mother, father, and two sisters killed by Hutu extremists. Daniel was hidden by a neighbor during this massacre.

After experiencing abuse, harassment, and discomfort for the next several years, Daniel left as a refugee to Lusaka, Zambia. Daniel hoped to move to the United States one day. In 2005, with the support of a few refugee organizations, Daniel was able to successfully move to Bridgeport, Connecticut. Daniel was granted his American citizenship five years later.

In 2008, Daniel graduated from Bassick High School, in Bridgeport, Connecticut. From 2008 through 2013, Daniel attended and graduated from Southern Connecticut State University. He was a business major.

== Career ==
Early in college, Daniel founded D-Trust Apparel clothing brand. From 2009 to 2014, Daniel worked in the corporate sector with TD Bank, N.A. To make time for his speaking career and non-profit organization, Daniel stepped away from D-Trust Apparel and resigned from TD Bank, N.A. Daniel had a store open for his business and attained the assistant manager position at TD Bank, N.A.

Daniel has spoken and lectured at colleges including University of Connecticut's "True Colors Conference," Duke University's "Genocide Remembrance event," Fairfield University, "Leadership Day" at the University of New Haven. Daniel has also spoken at high school's including Sayville High School, West Haven High School, Warren Harding High School, and other schools.
