= Marina Park Historic District =

- U.S. National Register of Historic Places
- U.S. Historic district
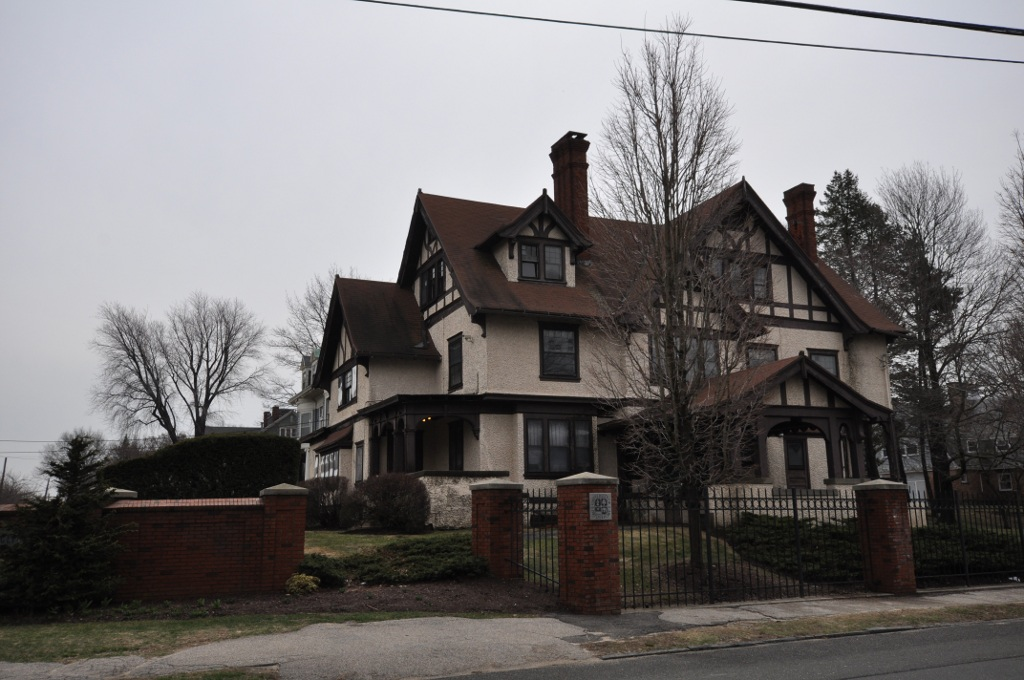

- Location within Connecticut Location within the United States
- Location: Marina Park, Park and Waldemere Avenues Bridgeport, Connecticut
- Coordinates: 41°9′52″N 73°11′30″W
- Area: 11 acres (4.5 ha)
- Built: 1887
- Architect: Longstaff, George
- Architectural style: Queen Anne, International Style, Shingle Style
- NRHP reference No.: 82004382
- Added to NRHP: April 27, 1982

The Marina Park Historic District encompasses the finest collection of high-style late 19th-century residential architecture in the city of Bridgeport, Connecticut. Extending along Park Avenue between Seaside Park and Atlantic Avenue, this area was home to Bridgeport's industrial and civic leaders, and was developed by city booster P.T. Barnum. The district was listed on the National Register of Historic Places in 1982.

== Description and history ==
The Marina Park development is located in the South End of Bridgeport, an area now largely taken up by the campus of the University of Bridgeport. The historic district is a small surviving area of a much larger development initiated by P.T. Barnum, who engineered the acquisition of Seaside Park for the city, and built his own residences (neither standing anymore) in the area. In the 1880s he subdivided his 30-acre (12 ha) estate known as Waldemere, selling off parcels for construction of a series of high-style residences. Many of these have since been demolished, mostly as part of the urban renewal that resulted in the construction of the university campus. A significant number of the surviving buildings are now owned by the university and used for a variety of purposes.

The houses that were built are in a variety of styles popular in the late 19th and early 20th century. The earliest of them is a fine example of the Queen Anne style, while there are several Shingle style houses. A notable exception is the Albert Erslew House at 257 Park Avenue, which is an International style house built in 1938 to a design by Franklin Jenkins Wallace. Credit for designing Barnum's subdivision has been given to George W. Longstaff, a prominent local architect.

== See also ==
- National Register of Historic Places listings in Bridgeport, Connecticut
