= Perry Memorial Arch =

Triumphal arch in Bridgeport, Connecticut

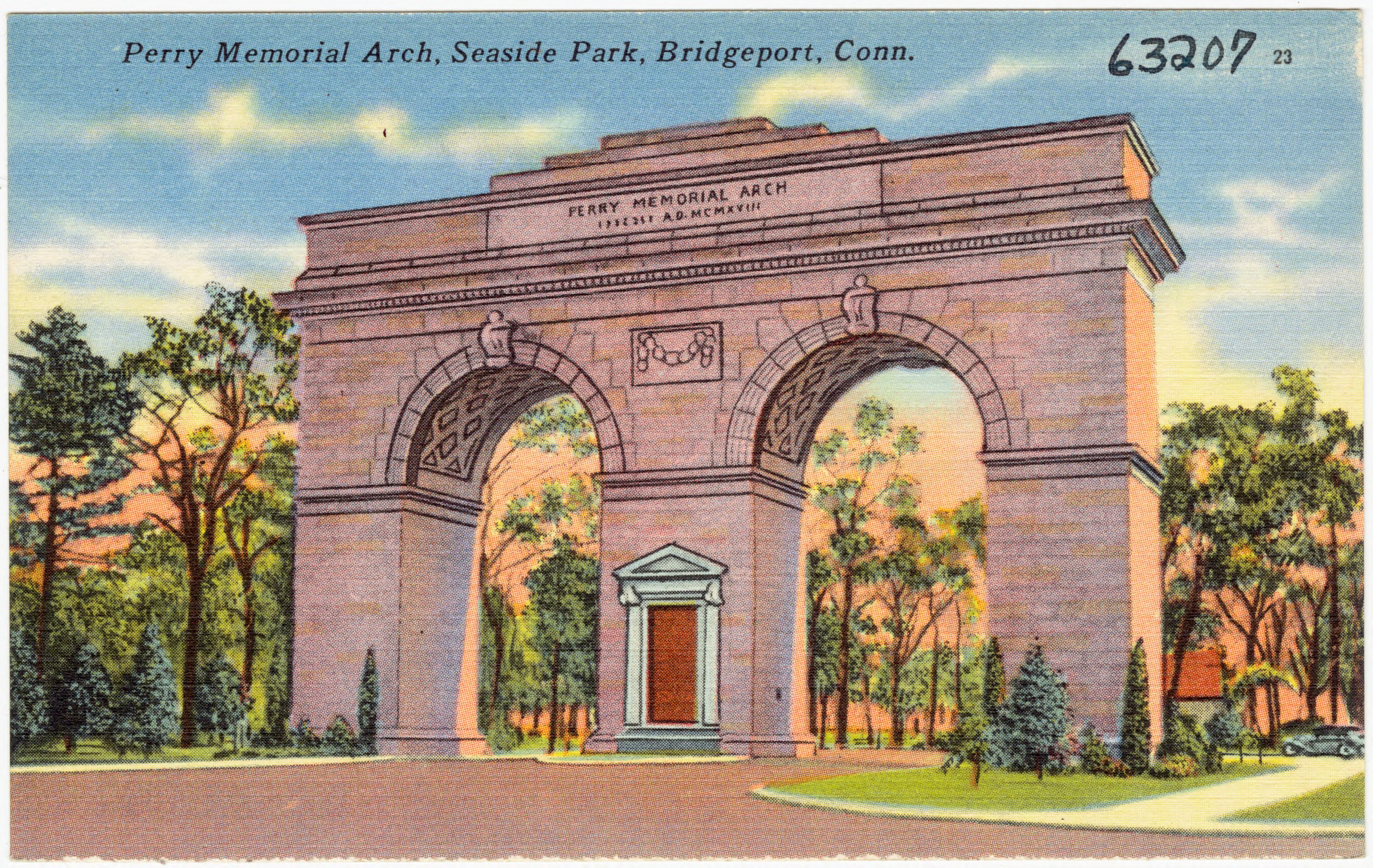
- Perry Memorial Arch (circa between 1930 and 1945)

General information
- Architectural style: Triumphal arch
- Coordinates: 41°09′46″N 73°11′22″W

Design and construction
- Architect: Henry Bacon

Perry Memorial Arch is an arch at the entrance to Seaside Park, Bridgeport, Connecticut. It was built in 1918 and designed by architect Henry Bacon.

== History ==
The archway was built in 1918 using granite. It was built in memory of William H. Perry, who had worked as a superintendent at Wheeler & Wilson Manufacturing Company, a maker of sewing machines. Perry was also the president of Bridgeport city parks commission. He had left money for the construction of an archway to serve as an entrance to Seaside Park. It was designed by Henry Bacon in 1916, who was the lead architect of the Lincoln Memorial in Washington, D.C. The Park has been placed National Register of Historic Places in the United States. In 1961, through the establishment of a fund and with the help of the fire department, the arch was renovated. The monument had been described as "imposing".
