= Success Lake (Connecticut) =

Lake in Bridgeport, Connecticut, United States

- Location within Connecticut Location within the United States
- Location: Fairfield County, Connecticut
- Coordinates: 41°12′39″N 73°09′55″W
- Primary outflows: Yellow Mill Channel
- Basin countries: United States
- Max. length: 1,100 feet (340 m)
- Max. width: 700 feet (210 m)
- Surface area: 25 acres (10 ha)
- Average depth: 10 feet (3.0 m)
- Max. depth: 17 feet (5.2 m)
- Water volume: 119 acre-feet (147,000 m^{3})
- Surface elevation: 46 ft (14 m)
- Islands: 0
- Settlements: Bridgeport, Connecticut

Success Lake is a reservoir in Bridgeport, Connecticut. The elevation of the reservoir is 46 feet. It is located in the 435 acre Lake Success Business Park, which was used to produce ammunition and explosives by the Remington Arms Company from 1905 through 1989 as it was then called "Remington Woods".

== Geography ==
The reservoir is made up of north and south components. The south is about 17 acres (6.9 ha) in size and 10 feet (3.0 m) deep, while the north is made up of two segments covering approximately 6 acres (2.4 ha), ranging from 3–6 feet (0.91–1.83 m) deep. The bottom of the lake is known to not be uniform. The outflow of the dam is the Yellow Mill Channel (also known as Yellow Mill Creek), which empties into Bridgeport Harbor.

== History ==
The lake dates from 1875, when the original dam was constructed.

Success Lake was surveyed by the United States Geological Survey (USGS) in September 1979, and again by the United States Army Corps of Engineers in 1981. The Corps report notes that the reservoir's purpose was for fire suppression.

The DuPont company spent $50 million and nearly twenty years in a remedial cleanup effort of the site's Stratford, Connecticut portion. The lake itself and its surrounding area had not been cleaned as of 2013.

The lake was re-evaluated in spring 2014. The report notes that munitions were disposed of in several areas of the northern section of the lake.

As of 2015, development plans have been slow to materialize for the site, and an advocacy group aligned with the Sierra Club is attempting to have the lake and the land surrounding it preserved as open space.

== Wildlife ==
The pond is renowned for containing no fish. This is likely because the lake is contaminated with both mercury and lead in high concentrations as well as storm water runoff carrying hazardous debris. The area around the lake includes a variety of local animal species including white-tailed deer but none that are considered rare or endangered.
