= Daniel Trust Foundation =

- Founder: Daniel Trust
- Type: 501(c) organization
- Purpose: Youth Mentoring and College Scholarships
- Region served: Bridgeport, CT and New York City

Daniel Trust Foundation is a youth development non-profit organization founded by Daniel Trust. It was launched in 2009 and provides mentorship and scholarship opportunities to high school seniors and student-selected recognition and funding for high school teachers. The foundation has offices in Bridgeport, Connecticut and New York City, and aims to be a student run organization for students by students.

The foundation awards students who have demonstrated academic excellence, activism or community service and commitment to pursuing higher education. The Kathy Silver Award is the foundation's teacher recognition program. In the scholarship application, students nominate an impactful high school teacher who is then considered for the award. It is a 501(c)(3) organization with scholars and teacher honorees from Connecticut, California, New York, and Georgia.

Since its inception, six scholars have appeared on lifestyle Connecticut TV shows life Better Connecticut on WFSB, Connecticut Style on WTNH, and Our Lives on News 12 Connecticut.

== Mission ==
The Daniel Trust Foundation aims to serve low-income, first-generation and underrepresented students. The scholarship and mentorship program helps plan student's education and career goals. The foundation also recognizes and awards deserving teachers with grants.

== Programs ==
The Daniel Trust Scholarship Program is a 4-year $2,000 scholarship designed to support its recipients' educational endeavors. The scholarship is awarded to high school seniors who are working to improve their local and international communities through activism and public service. Recipients of this scholarship receive $500 annually to fund college textbook expenses as well as other college materials.

In 2015, the foundation started a mentorship program for local Bridgeport High School students. The foundation aims to provide resources to students beyond the Scholarship program. The mentorship program provides college readiness, teen driving education and financial literacy.

In 2014, the foundation awarded eight scholarships. Four out of the eight Scholars were from the Bridgeport Education system. In 2015, the foundation awarded seven scholarships. In 2016, the foundation awarded fifteen scholarships, with twelve out of the fifteen scholars from the Bridgeport Education system. The recipients' causes ranged from contributing to the special needs/disabled community, promoting world peace to advocating for human rights to building schools overseas in Africa. Daniel Trust Foundation Scholars are currently attending the country’s most prestigious universities including the University of California at Berkeley, Harvard University, University of North Carolina at Chapel Hill, American University, and Yale.
