= Seaside Park (Connecticut) =

- U.S. National Register of Historic Places
- U.S. Historic district
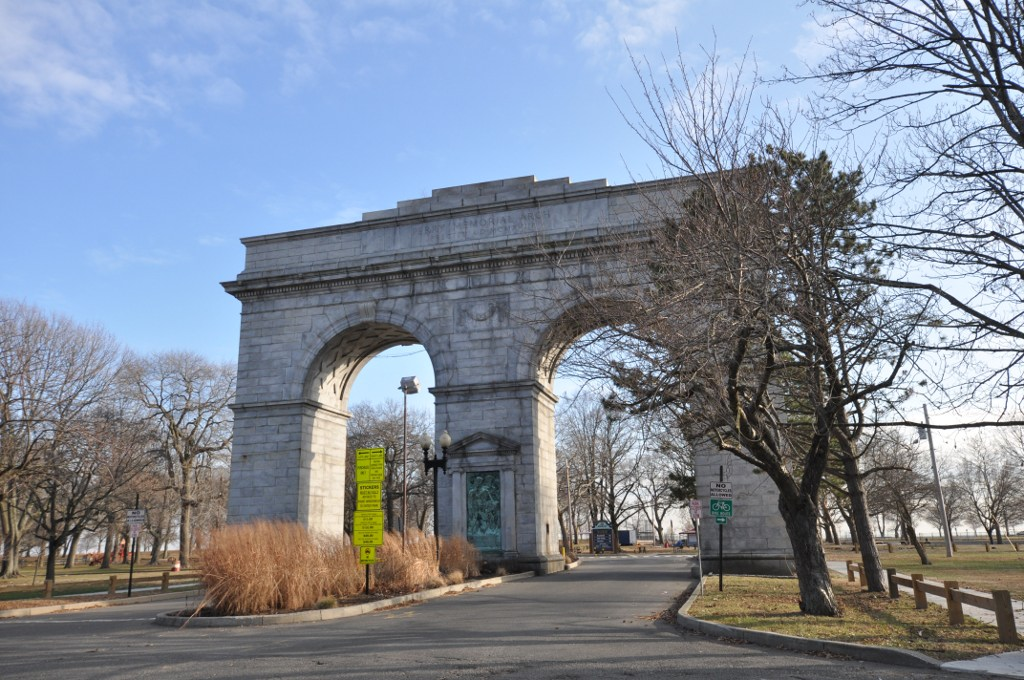
- Perry Memorial Arch

- Location within Connecticut Location within the United States
- Location: South End, Bridgeport, Connecticut
- Coordinates: 41.159°N 73.202°W
- Area: 375 acres (152 ha)
- Architects: Frederick Law Olmsted; Ernest G. Southey
- Architectural style: Classical, American "beautiful"
- NRHP reference No.: 82004373
- Added to NRHP: July 1, 1982

Seaside Park, located in Bridgeport, Connecticut, is a 2.5-mile (4.0 km) long crescent-shaped park bordering Bridgeport Harbor, Long Island Sound, and Black Rock Harbor. The park lies within Bridgeport's South End neighborhood.

== History ==
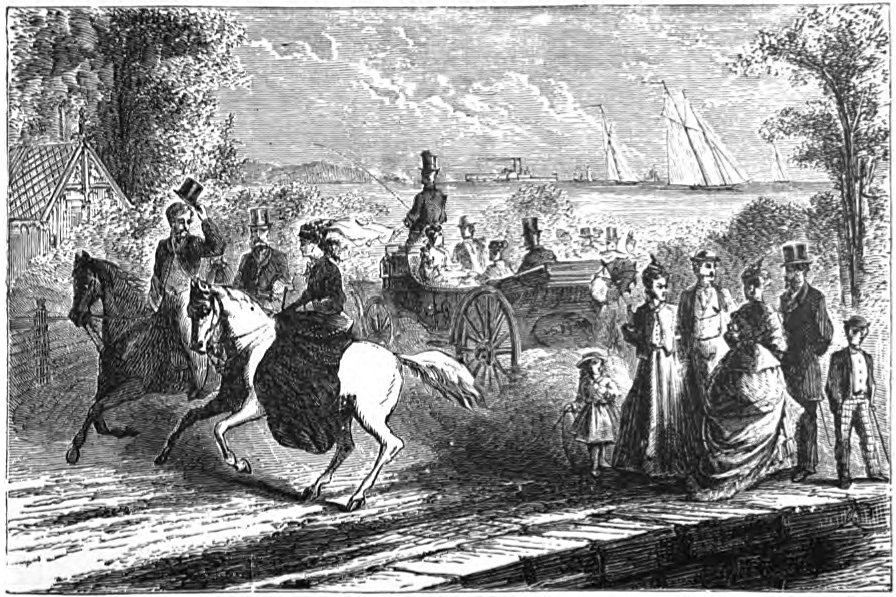
Seaside Park, before 1886

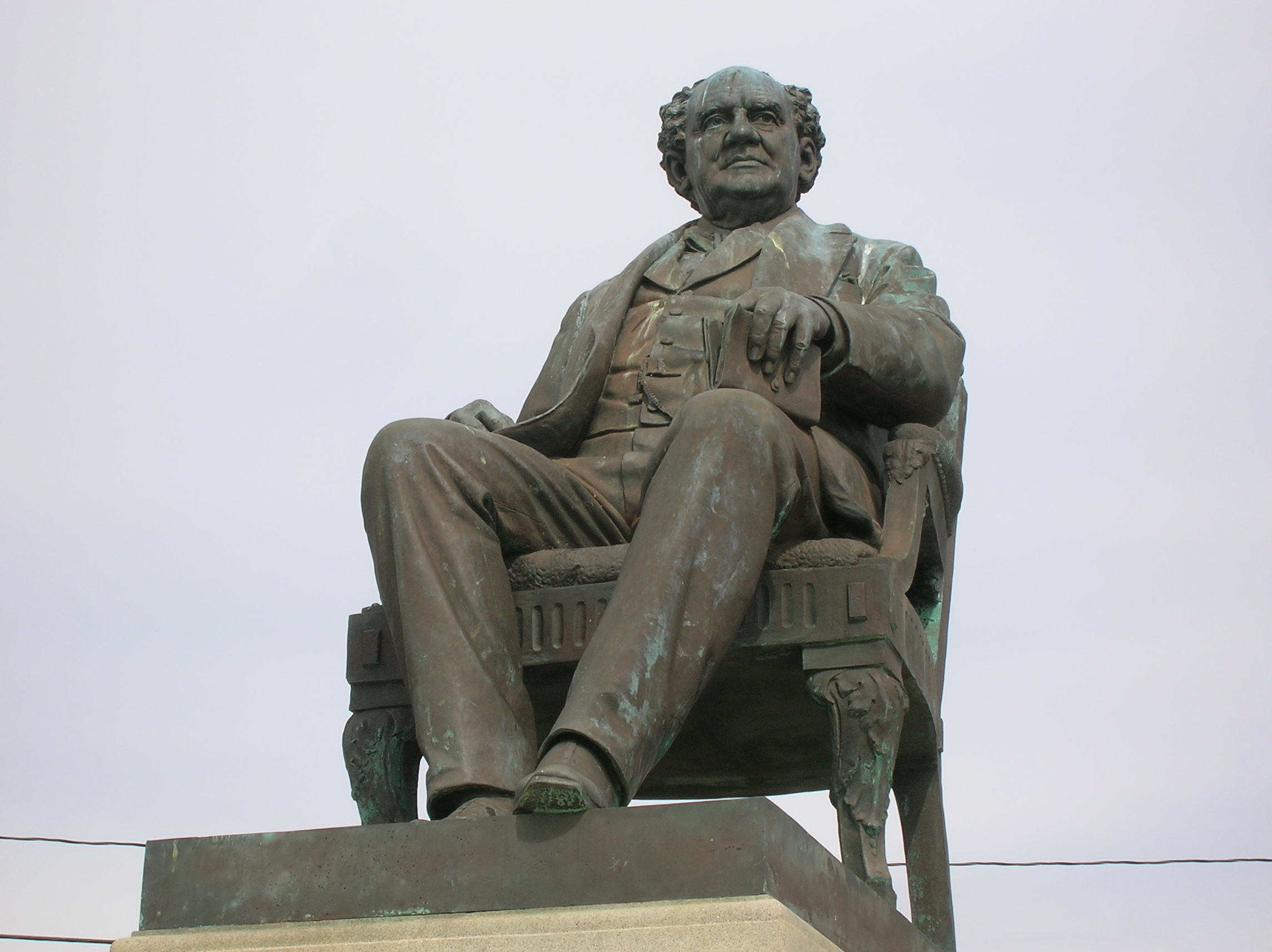
P. T. Barnum Monument, sculpted by Thomas Ball in 1887, and placed at Seaside Park in 1893.

As Bridgeport rapidly grew in population in the 19th century, residents recognized the need for more public parks. In 1863, The Standard urged the creation of one or more public parks in the city and a movement began to create a park along Long Island Sound and Black Rock Harbor. By 1864, P. T. Barnum and other residents had donated approximately 35 acres (14 ha) to create Seaside Park, gradually increased to about 100 acres (40 ha) by 1884. In 1867, plans for a seawall and a driving track and walkway were made and drawings for the park were obtained from Frederick Law Olmsted whose firm completed the work. Barnum donated additional land between Iranistan Avenue, Barnum Dyke, and Waldemere Avenue in 1878. In 1866, work on a Soldiers' monument was begun and the completed monument was dedicated in 1876. In 1884, a statue of Elias Howe was added and a bronze statue of Barnum (created by Thomas Ball) was added in 1893. A final major monument, the William Hunt Perry Memorial Arch (designed by Henry Bacon, architect of the Lincoln Memorial in Washington, D.C.) was added in 1918. In 1884, Olmsted described Seaside Park as "a capital place for a drive or walk.... a fine dressy promenade."

In the early 1900s the park's driving track was still being used for horse driving, but enthusiasts of early automobiles also raced their "steam carriages" and "gasoline cars" on the park's track.

The addition of Fayerweather Island in 1911 and Barnum Field in 1936, coupled with landfill operations, increased the size of the park to its present total of 375 acres (152 ha).

Seaside Park was listed on the National Register of Historic Places in 1982. Frederick Law Olmsted, Calvert Vaux, and Egbert Viele were the principal architects of the design. Bridgeport architect Ernest G. Southey drew plans for the Casino ('old' bath house). The site contains three major historic buildings, the Casino (1918), stables erected at the same time and, on Fayerweather Island, Black Rock Harbor Light erected in 1823.

From 1994 to 2002, Bridgeport's Parks Department spent some $9 million on improvements. Results include a realignment of roads, more parking and a new bathhouse on the west beach with bathrooms, showers and cabanas. Not everyone was pleased about the physical changes. Charles W. Brilvitch, the city's official Historian said of the changes: "They've just disrespected the original design of the park. It was designed to have a boulevard along the waterfront, and now we've got parking lots, and we've got all this junk, this modern sculpture -- stuff that just doesn't belong in an Olmsted, Vaux and Viele park." Joe P. Gresko, the city's spokesperson, said "When Olmsted designed the park, it was back in the 1800s, when vehicles were really rare to be seen. If we kept it as is, you're asking everyone to walk to the park. I think we've improved the park. Keeping the old bathhouse and renovating it is an example of how we're trying to keep the original design in mind."

== Music in the park ==
Seaside Park has a long history of being a venue for concerts. When the idea of Sunday concerts "for the benefit of the working people" was proposed in 1890, many neighboring residents opposed the plan, but Barnum, whose own home abutted the park, championed the cause in the local papers. When there was talk of police interference at the first concert, Barnum told the band leader to come play at his home and that the grounds would be open to all who wanted to hear the music.

In the 1930s, the Bridgeport WPA Orchestra, a statewide unit of the Federal Music Project, gave Thursday night concerts free to the public with amplification provided by the city.

Starting in summer 1999 and 2000, and every year since 2007, Seaside Park has been home to Gathering of the Vibes an annual four-day music, camping and arts festival that celebrates the Grateful Dead and showcases a diverse variety of music.

== Facilities ==
Seaside Park offers many amenities including ball fields, picnic areas, a bathing beach, bath houses, and hiking trails. Parts of the park offering views of the water are wheelchair accessible. Food concessions, an access pier and boat launching facilities are available.

== See also ==
- Fayerweather Island
- Black Rock Harbor Light
- History of Bridgeport, Connecticut
- National Register of Historic Places listings in Bridgeport, Connecticut
