= Kevin Belcher (offensive tackle) =

American football player (1961–1997)

No. 76, 73
- Position: Offensive tackle

Personal information
- Born: November 9, 1961; Bridgeport, Connecticut, U.S.
- Died: April 12, 1997 (aged 35); Howard, Wisconsin, U.S.
- Listed height: 6 ft 6 in (1.98 m)
- Listed weight: 310 lb (141 kg)

Career information
- High school: Bassick (Bridgeport)
- College: Wisconsin
- NFL draft: 1985: 7th round, 186th overall pick

Career history
- Los Angeles Raiders (1985–1986); Denver Broncos (1987)

Career NFL statistics
- Games played: 5
- Games started: 1
- Stats at Pro Football Reference

Kevin Leander Belcher (November 9, 1961 – April 12, 1997) was an American professional football offensive tackle who played two seasons in the National Football League (NFL) with the Los Angeles Raiders and Denver Broncos. He was selected by the Raiders in the seventh round of the 1985 NFL draft. He played college football at the University of Wisconsin–Madison.

== Early life and college ==
Kevin Leander Belcher was born on November 9, 1961, in Bridgeport, Connecticut. He attended Bassick High School in Bridgeport.

He was a member of the Wisconsin Badgers of the University of Wisconsin–Madison from 1981 to 1984 and a three-year letterman from 1982 to 1984.

== Professional career ==
Belcher was selected by the Los Angeles Raiders with the 186th pick in the 1985 NFL draft and played in four games for the team during the 1985 season. He also spent time on injured reserve during the season. He was released by the Raiders in August 1986.

Belcher played in one game, a start, for the Denver Broncos in 1987.

== Personal life ==
Belcher died at his home in Howard, Wisconsin on April 12, 1997.
