= Bridgeport Harbor =

- Interactive map of Bridgeport Harbor

Location
- Country: United States
- Location: Bridgeport, Connecticut
- Coordinates: 41°09′24″N 73°10′48″W
- UN/LOCODE: USBDR

Details
- Type of Harbor: recreational and commercial

Bridgeport Harbor is an inlet on the north side of Long Island Sound in Bridgeport, Connecticut. It was carved by the retreat of the glaciers during the last ice age approximately 13,000 years ago.

Bridgeport Harbor is a federal shipping port and a terminus of the Bridgeport & Port Jefferson Steamboat Company, one of the oldest ferry companies in the nation. It is due east of the smaller Black Rock Harbor which is also in the city of Bridgeport.

A section of the harbor is planned to be reconstructed as an offshore wind port, serving the Vineyard Wind and Park City Wind projects.

== Geography ==
Bridgeport's Success Lake (Connecticut) and Stilman Pond both egress via the Yellow Mill Channel and into the tidal marsh at the top of the harbor. The Pequonnock River empties into the inlet on its north end while the Tongue Point Light is at the western end of the mouth of the harbor.

=== Notable structures in or near the harbor ===
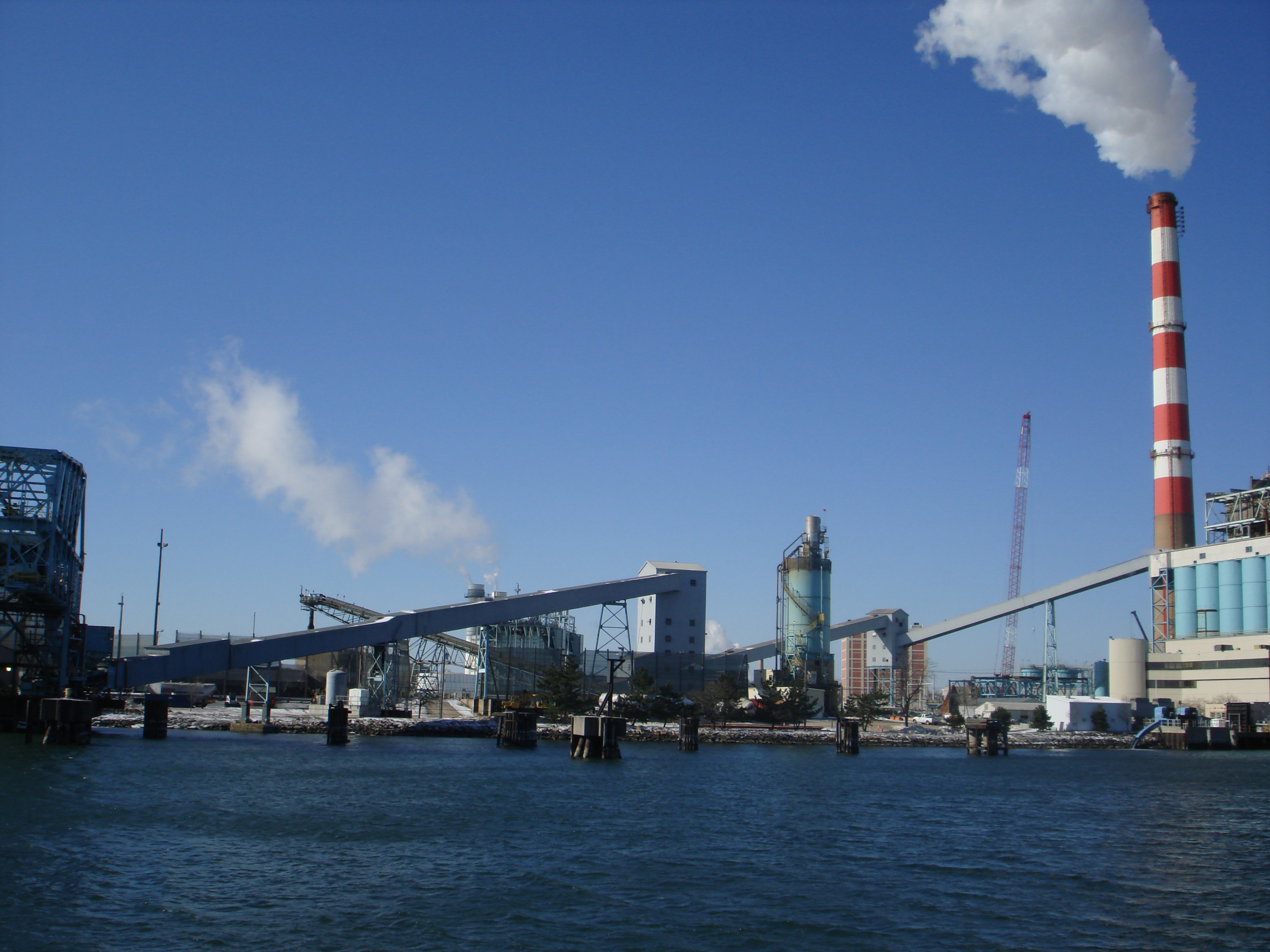
The generation station as seen from the harbor

- Arena at Harbor Yard, a 10,000 seat capacity basketball, hockey and sporting venue.
- The Ballpark at Harbor Yard, a 5,300 seat outdoor venue which is home to the Bridgeport Bluefish baseball team.
- Berkshire No. 7, a shipwreck, sank in 1974 along with the Elmer S. Dailey and the Priscilla Dailey
- Pequonnock River Railroad Bridge is listed on the National Register of Historic Places.
- Pleasure Beach, also known as "Steeplechase Island", is a former amusement park and ghost town. It is the site of the transmission towers for WICC (AM).
- The PSEG Bridgeport Harbor Generating Station is a familiar piece of the Bridgeport skyline. Units 1, 2, and 3, all coal-fired and built between 1957 and 1968, were closed in 2021 and are undergoing demolition. The main plant buildings were imploded on September 29, 2025. The three smokestacks, including the 500-foot tall "candy cane" stack are scheduled for implosion in Spring 2026. The closure of Units 1, 2, and 3 follows the opening of the natural gas-fired Bridgeport Energy station in 1999 and Bridgeport Harbor Generating Station, Unit 5 in 2019.

== History ==
Originally used for shipbuilding, it now operates mainly as a shipping port. The harbor was dredged by the Army Corps of Engineers in 1964. Current plans to dredge it again have met with opposition from residents of New Haven due to plans to dump the dredged material at Morris Cove.

A 4000-ton dry dock was opened in 2010.

== Transportation ==
The Bridgeport & Port Jefferson Ferry is berthed in the harbor. The harbor is located at the end of 8/25 connector, where it merges into Interstate 95, near the Bridgeport (Metro-North station), a stop for Amtrak, Metro-North and Shoreline East trains.

== See also ==
- Bridgeport Harbor Light
