= Fayerweather Island =

Island in the Long Island Sound in Connecticut

Coordinates: 41°8′35″N 73°12′58″W

Fayerweather Island is a 7 1/2-acre land mass in Long Island Sound. Part of the city of Bridgeport, Connecticut, it is located south of the city's Seaside Park. The island contains a resurgent coastal forest composed primarily of white oak (Quercus alba) and Eastern red cedar (Juniperus virginiana) growth. It is home to the Black Rock Harbor Light, located on the south of the island, and first built in 1808.

== Physical description ==
- Elevation: ~3 feet (0.91 m).
- NOAA maintains weather station FWIC3 on the island.

== History ==
- 1807: Island purchased from David Fayerweather by the US Government.
- 1823: The present lighthouse was built by Enoch Foote of Bridgeport, with four-foot-thick rubble walls faced with brownstone ashlar, to replace an earlier wooden structure that had been washed away in a hurricane. A keeper's house was constructed at the same time.
- 1837–38: A granite seawall—called "the fortification"—was constructed to help maintain the integrity of the island and lighthouse station. It was extended across what had become little more than a sandbar to connect with a larger portion of Fayerweather Island in 1849.
- 1844: Lantern of lighthouse reconstructed
- 1873: Keeper's house rebuilt, with self-sufficient cistern water supply.
- 1894: Dredging project completed, providing 6-foot-deep (1.8 m) channel around the island into the harbor at low tide. Seawall repaired & improved.
- 1911: Island acquired by the city of Bridgeport. Reconstruction of the seawall is begun that would connect the island to the western end of Seaside Park.
- 1919: New seawall and roadway completed that connected the upper portion of Fayerweather Island (now the western end of the park mainland) to the older portions of Seaside Park.
- 1933: Lighthouse decommissioned.
- 1977: Keeper's house destroyed by fire.
- 1986: A state-record 17 lb 14 oz weakfish was caught on the island.

== See also ==
- History of Bridgeport, Connecticut
