= Black Rock Harbor =

Black Rock Harbor is adjacent to the Black Rock neighborhood of Bridgeport, Connecticut, United States, on Long Island Sound. The Black Rock Harbor Light on Fayerweather Island marks the entrance to the harbor on its east, while St. Mary's by the Sea forms its western beachhead. Seaside Park runs along the northeastern part of the harbor. The harbor serves as the mouth of Cedar Creek. Initially, it developed as a trade port and shipbuilding center in the 18th century. However, it has now primarily become a recreational harbor, as it was surpassed by the enlarged Bridgeport Harbor, which was enhanced by substantial breakwaters in 1907.

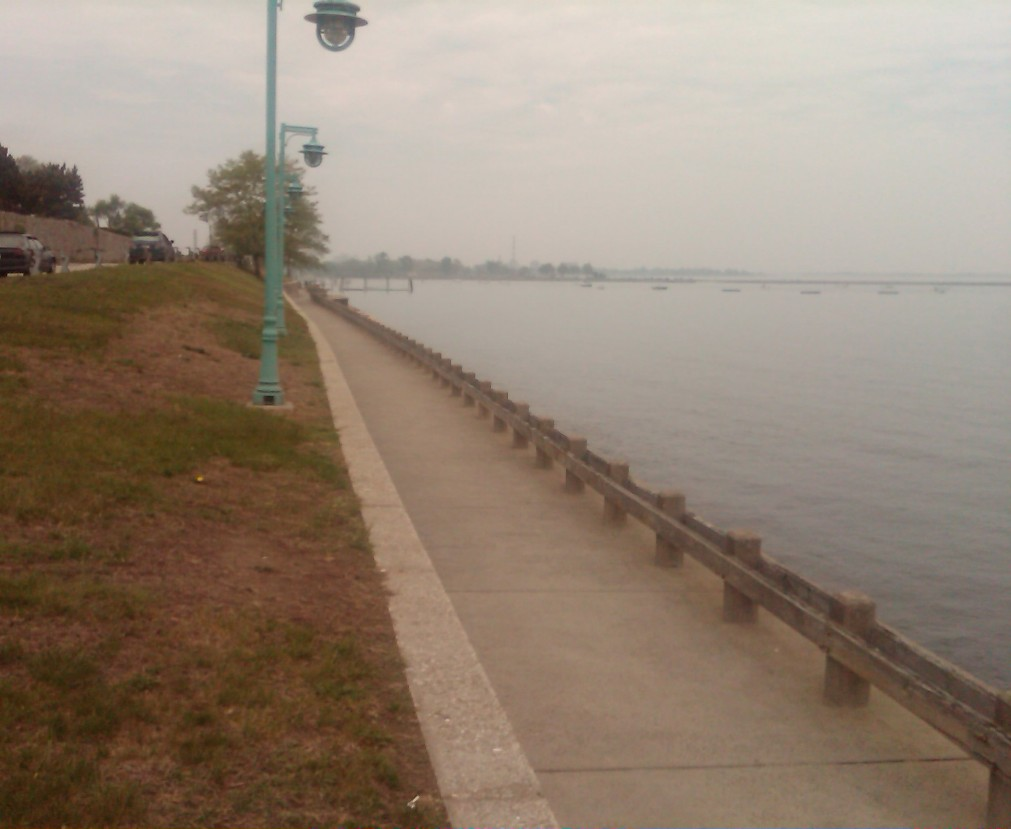
St. Mary's by the Sea walkway at Black Rock Harbor in Bridgeport

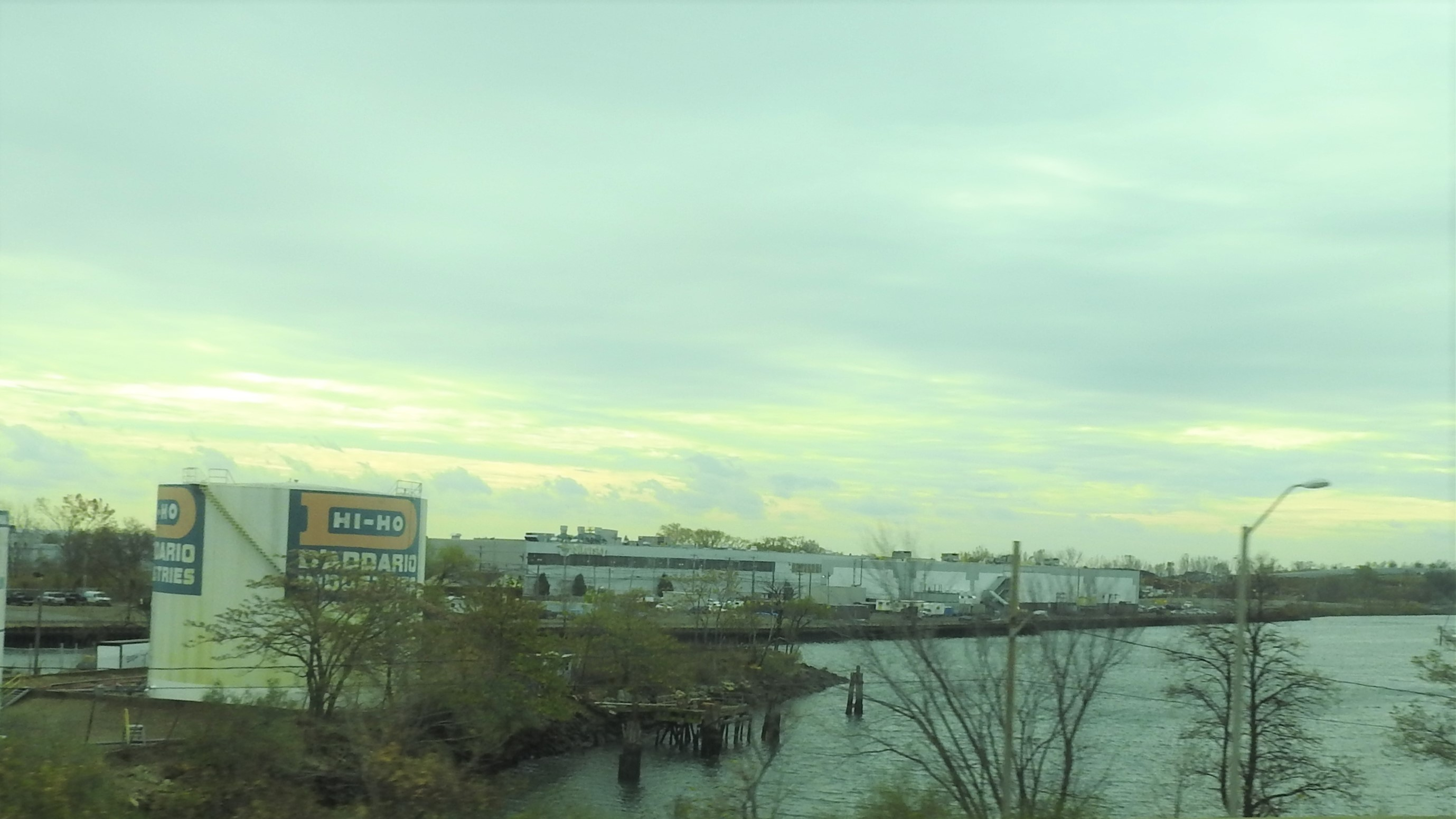
Cedar Creek and Black Rock Harbor as seen from I-95

St. Mary's by the Sea is a residential walkway along Long Island Sound where outdoor enthusiasts can enjoy observing birds and wildlife by bringing binoculars. The area features walkways suitable for power walkers as well as those seeking a leisurely stroll. The site also holds historic and cultural interest for visitors to explore.

== See also ==
- David Hawley
- Thomas Wheeler House
