= Black Rock Harbor Light =

Lighthouse in Connecticut, United States

Black Rock Harbor Light Fayerweather Island
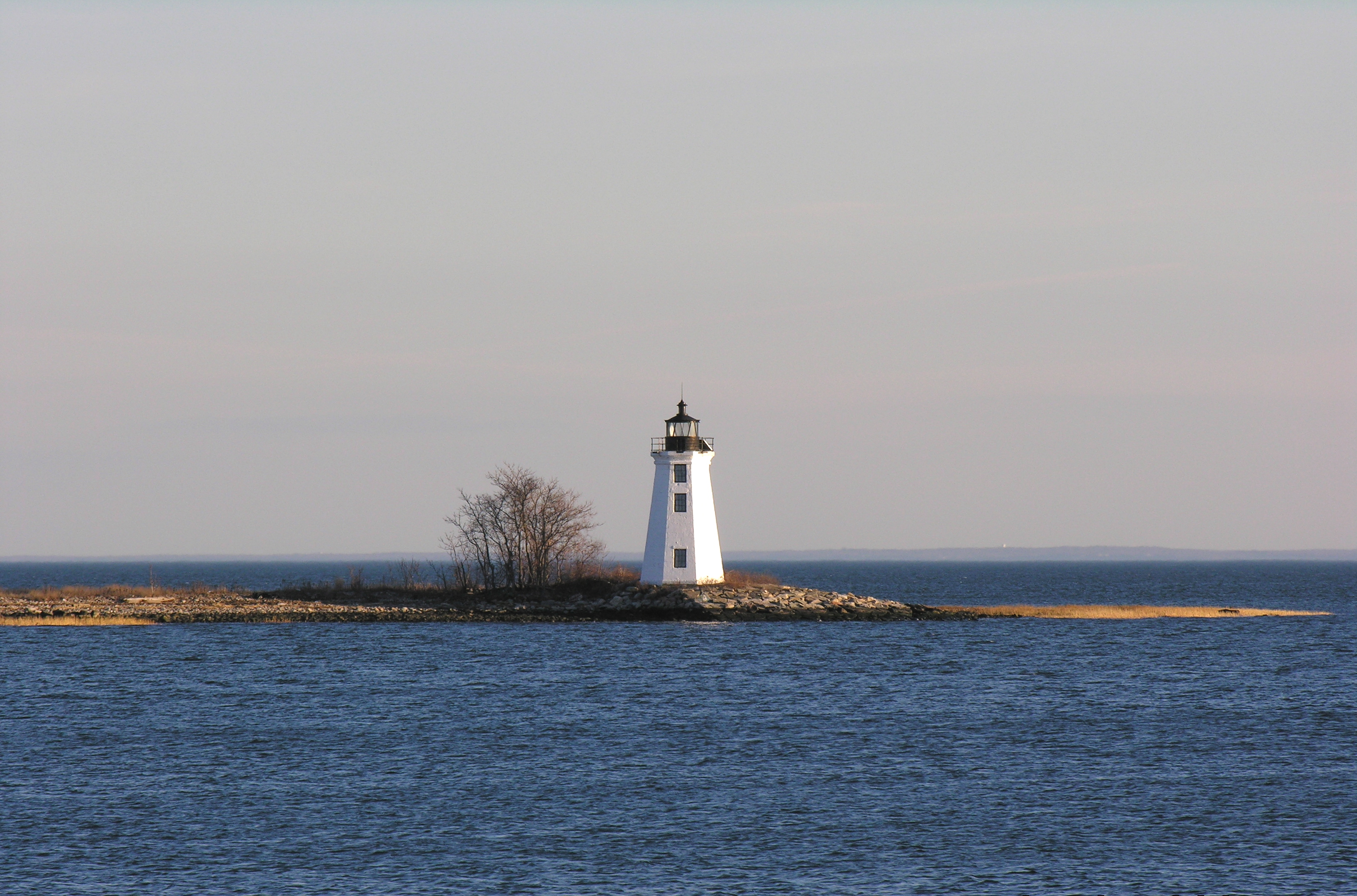
- Black Rock Harbor Light in 2005
- Location: Fayerweather Island, Fairfield County, Connecticut, United States
- Coordinates: 41°08′33″N 73°13′00″W

Tower
- Constructed: 1808 (first)
- Foundation: fieldstone basement
- Construction: granite rubble and brownstone block tower
- Height: 41 ft (12 m)
- Shape: octagonal tower with balcony and lantern
- Markings: White (tower), black (lantern)
- Operator: City of Bridgeport

Light
- First lit: 1823 (current)
- Deactivated: 1932
- Lens: 8 lamps, 14 inches (360 mm) parabolic reflectors (original), decorative solar light (current)
- Range: 11 nmi (20 km; 13 mi)
- Characteristic: F W

Black Rock Harbor Light, also known as Fayerweather Island Light, is a lighthouse in Bridgeport, Connecticut, United States which stands on the south end of Fayerweather Island and marks the entrance to Black Rock Harbor. The first lighthouse at the site, built by Abisha Woodward under contract with the United States government, was a wooden tower that was lit and made operational by 1808. A storm destroyed the tower in 1821 and the current, stone lighthouse was erected in its place in 1823. The Black Rock Harbor Light was an active navigational aid until 1933 when it was replaced by two automatic lights offshore. The beacon was subsequently given to the City of Bridgeport in 1934. Two significant efforts during the 1980s and 1990s served to restore the aging tower and the light was relit as a non-navigational aid in 2000. Black Rock Lighthouse is listed as a contributing property for Bridgeport's Seaside Park historic district.

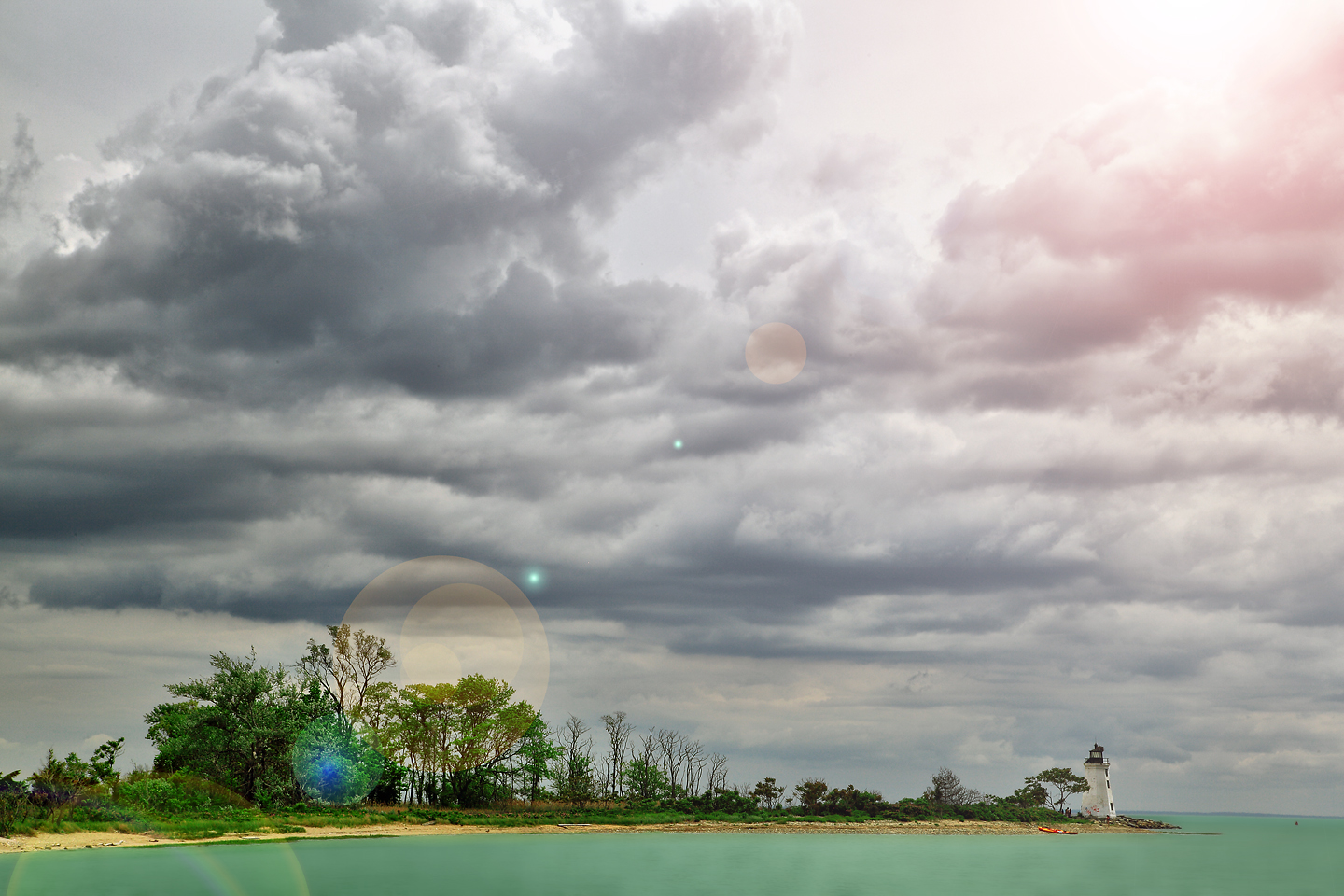
Black Rock Harbor Light on Fayerweather Island

== Construction ==
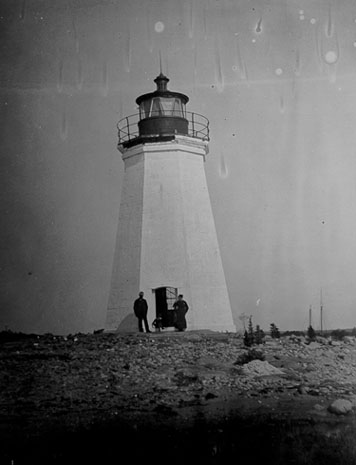
19th century view of the Light

In 1807, the United States government bought the 9.5 acres (3.8 ha) of land upon which the lighthouse stands from Daniel Fayerweather for $200. The government appropriated $5000 for the light station in February 1807 and contracted Abisha Woodward to construct the light. The first Black Rock Harbor Light was a 40-foot (12.1 meter) octagonal wooden tower built in 1808. Abisha Woodward, who previously constructed the 1801 New London Harbor Light and the 1802 Falkner Island Light, constructed a wooden tower that was lit and made operational by October 1808. The lightkeeper's home was a small 1 1/2-story home built on the opposite side of a marsh, several hundred feet away from the tower. Another brick structure was built to house the oil. The total cost of the wooden lighthouse, and likely the accompanying keeper's house and oil house, was listed at $4604.69.

On September 3, 1821, the wooden tower was destroyed in the Norfolk and Long Island hurricane and was replaced with a 40-foot (12.1 meter) octagonal stone tower at a cost of $2300.53. Completed in 1823, the new tower was made of coursed sandstone ashlar and rubble mortar and was claimed by its builder to "withstand the storm of ages." This boisterous claim was countered by Edmund Blunt, an American Coast Pilot, who stated, "a more contemptible Lighthouse does not disgrace Long Island Sound, most shamefully erected and badly kept." In 1835, $2052.63 was used to preserve the buildings on Fayerweather Island, including the lighthouse. Three years later, in 1838, on the report of a Captain Gregory, another $1529.60 was used to build a seawall to protect the buildings. Another $15,000 would be used from 1847 through 1849 to complete the seawall. The original keeper's quarters, then referred to as a "dilapidated old edifice", was replaced in 1879.

== Service ==
The lighthouse originally had a whale oil spider lamp from the Stratford Point Light, but it was upgraded to a system with eight lamps in 1830. In 1838, it was reported by Lieutenant George Bache that the reflectors were out of alignment and the light was barely visible in hazy conditions. In 1854, a fifth-order Fresnel lens was installed. The Black Rock Harbor Light was deactivated in 1932 following the construction of two offshore automatic lights.

== Restoration ==
The lighthouse was given to the city of Bridgeport, Connecticut in 1934 and became a part of Seaside Park. In the following years, vandals "gutted the interior" of the lighthouse. In 1977, the keeper's quarters building was destroyed in a fire. The first restoration effort came in 1983 when the Friends of Seaside Park restored the tower. Fayerweather Island was cleaned of debris, landscaped and established as a nature preserve. They installed steel "windows" and also secured the entry with a steel panel, but vandals again forced their way into the lighthouse.

A second effort was mounted by David Grant Grimshaw and Patricia Roche in 1993. A sum of $25,000 cash and in-kind services was raised with fundraising and annual Preservation Balls; it was later matched by the City of Bridgeport's Board of Park Commissioners with another grant of $25,000. During the night of the 1996 Preservation Ball the lighthouse was mysteriously lit, but Grimshaw did not arrange the illumination. D'Entremont writes that "maybe the spirit of Kate Moore had grown tired of waiting for the restoration." The 1998 restoration was conducted under the direction of David Barbour, a local architect. The restoration included masonry repairs, reglazing the lantern room, rust removal from the railings, new doors and windows with vandal-proof steel panes. The lighthouse was repainted with graffiti-resistant paint in the original paint and mortar colors. The light, relit in 2000, does not serve as an active navigational aid. The light is powered by solar panels on the top of the lighthouse; it was donated by United Illuminating and Bridgeport Energy. In 2004, vandals smashed the solar panels and new panels with protective cages were installed in 2007.

== Access ==
The lighthouse is listed as a contributing property for Bridgeport's Seaside Park historic district, which was listed on July 1, 1982. The grounds are accessible by parking at Seaside Park and crossing a breakwater, but the lighthouse is not open to the public.

== List of keepers ==
Name	Year	Service Notes
John Maltbie	1808‑1809	Died in service after five months.
Charles Isaac Judson	1809‑1814	Died in service.
Daniel Willson (Wilson)	1814‑c. 1817	
Stephen Moore	1817‑1871	A West Indies trader. As his health failed, his duties were performed by his daughter, Catherine Moore, until his death.
Catherine (Kate) Moore	1871‑1878	Daughter of Stephen Moore. Performed the duties of a keeper from the age of 12. Credited with saving 21 lives. Actual service is longer than official service due to her father's failing health; became keeper after his death until her retirement.
Leonard Clark	1878‑1906	Veteran of the Civil War and whaling captain. Served to his death in 1906.
Mary Elizabeth Clark	1906	Keeper for two months after her husband, Leonard Clark, died.
John D. Davis	1906‑1932	Previously in the Irish Lighthouse service. Last official keeper.
Charles H. Gilmore	c. 1933‑1952	Caretaker.

== Notes ==
- The construction date of the lighthouse have been subject to some variance in reports. D'Entremont cites the contractor and that the lighthouse was in operation by October 1808. Various sources, including the National Park Service, lists the established date as 1809. D'Entremont's corrections and details are reflected for these dates.
- According to Lighthouse Friends, Isaac Judson was the second keeper and served from 1808 to 1817, with the position passing to Stephen Moore. D'Entremont's details are reflected due to the comprehensive listing of the keepers.
- Historically, Fayerweather Island was also referred to as Fairweather Island.

== See also ==
- History of Bridgeport, Connecticut
- List of lighthouses in Connecticut
