= Fairfield County Courthouse =

Fairfield County Courthouse may refer to:

- Fairfield County Courthouse (Bridgeport, Connecticut), listed on the NRHP in Fairfield County, Connecticut
- Fairfield County Courthouse (Danbury, Connecticut)
- Fairfield County Courthouse (Ohio)
