= History of Bridgeport, Connecticut =

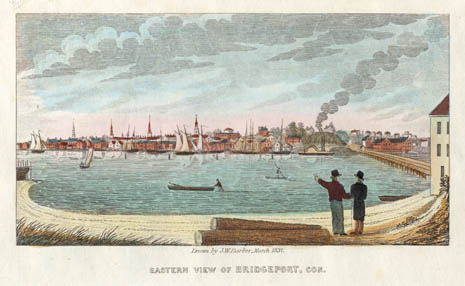
Eastern View of Bridgeport, Con. by John Warner Barber (1837)

The history of Bridgeport, Connecticut was, in the late 17th and most of the 18th century, one of land acquisitions from the native inhabitants, farming and fishing. From the mid-18th century to the mid-19th century, Bridgeport's history was one of shipbuilding, whaling and rapid growth. Bridgeport's growth accelerated even further from the mid-19th century to the mid-20th century with the advent of the railroad, Industrialization, massive immigration, labor movements until, at its peak population in 1950, Bridgeport with some 159,000 people was Connecticut's second most populous city. In the late 20th century, Bridgeport's history was one of deindustrialization and declining population, though it overtook Hartford as the state's most populous city by 1980.

== Pre-colonial period ==
Much of the land that became Bridgeport was originally occupied by the Pequonnock Indians of the Paugussett nation. One village consisted of about five or six hundred inhabitants in approximately 150 lodgings.

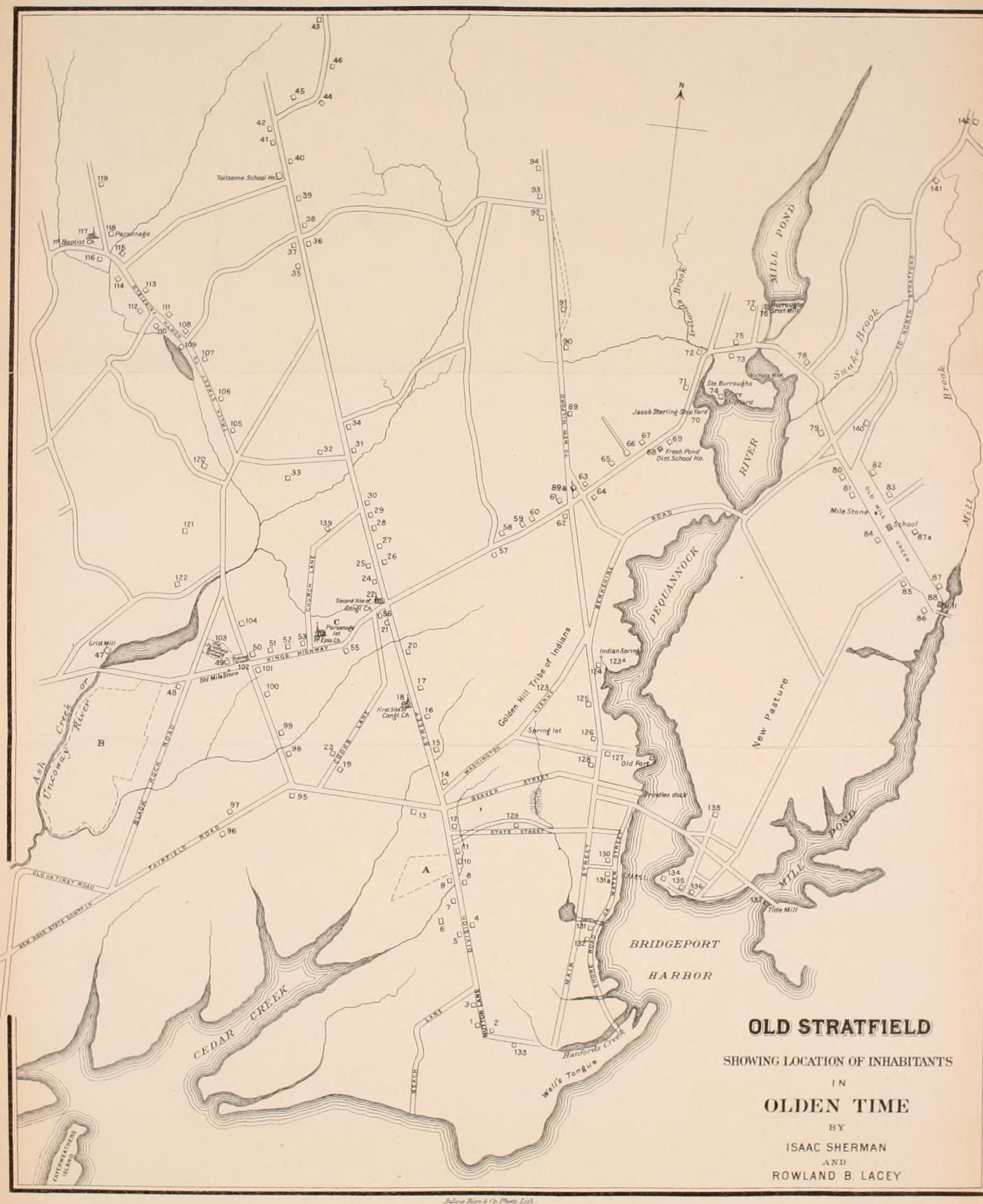
Old Stratfield by Isaac Sherman and Rowland B. Lacey

== Colonial period ==
Other than Black Rock and Parts of Brooklawn which were originally part of the township of Fairfield, Bridgeport was originally a part of the township of Stratford. The first English settlement on the west bank of the mouth of the Pequonnock River was made in about 1665 and was called Pequonnock. (Some sources have the first settlement as early as 1639 or 1659.) This village was renamed Newfield sometime before 1777. More people settled further inland and to the West and the area collectively became known as Fairfield Village in 1694, a name that was officially changed to Stratfield in 1701, likely due to its location between the already existing towns of Stratford and Fairfield. The ecclesiastical history of Bridgeport begins with the formation of the Stratfield Ecclesiastical Society in 1678 for the purpose of forming a school, with reference to a pastor ministering in Stratfield as early as 1688; and the establishment of a Congregational Church in 1695.

== Late 18th century and 19th century ==
During the American Revolution, Bridgeport was a center of privateering. Captain David Hawley of Stratfield brought a number of prizes into Black Rock Harbor. In 1800, Newfield village on the west bank of the Pequonnock was chartered as the borough of Bridgeport, and, in 1821, the township of Bridgeport, including more of Stratfield, was incorporated. Finally, Bridgeport was chartered as a city in 1836.

Bridgeport's early years were marked by a reliance on fishing and farming, much like other towns in New England. The city's location on the deep Newfield harbor (mouth of the Pequonnock) fostered a boom in shipbuilding and whaling in the mid-19th century. To aid navigation, Bridgeport Harbor Light was constructed in 1851 and reconstructed in 1871. Bridgeport's growth accelerated after the opening of a railroad to the city in 1840. Bridgeport was connected by rail first to New Milford in 1840, then Waterbury and New Haven in 1848, and New York City in 1849.

In the 1820s, about the time Connecticut abolished slavery, free blacks started settling in a neighborhood that became known as "Little Liberia", whose oldest surviving buildings date to 1848 and are Connecticut's oldest African-American houses. Per the 1840 Census, Bridgeport's population of "colored persons" totaled 148, or 4.49% of its total population.

In the 1830s, East Bridgeport was still largely farmland but the construction of foot and general traffic bridges over the Pequonnock in the 1840s and 1850s opened the area to development and it was not long before the area became a major area for industry.

=== Abraham Lincoln's visit ===
In February 1860, Abraham Lincoln came east to speak at Cooper Union in New York City, where on February 27 he impressed eastern Republicans as an intelligent, dignified statesman and gained support in his bid for the presidential nomination. Since the speech went over well, he made several others (all similar to his Cooper Union speech) in Connecticut and Rhode Island, traveling by train to various cities. After stopping in Providence, Norwich, Hartford, Meriden and New Haven, he made his final speech in the evening of Saturday, March 10, in Bridgeport.

His train was scheduled to stop at 10:27 a.m. in Bridgeport, and he likely met with Republican leaders. "He was entertained at the home of Mr. Frederick Wood at 67 Washington Avenue, and it is said that there he had his first experience with New England fried oysters," wrote Nelson R. Burr in Abraham Lincoln: Western Star Over Connecticut. "Another tradition is that while he stayed in Bridgeport a little girl, Mary A. Curtis of Stratford, presented him with a bouquet of flowers and a bunch of salt hay from the Stratford meadows. ... Where the flowers came from at that season, and how the hay could be cheerfully green, is not explained."

Lincoln spoke in Washington Hall, an auditorium at what was then Bridgeport City Hall (now McLevy Hall), at the corner of State and Broad streets. Not only was the largest room in the city packed, but a crowd formed outside made up of people who could not get in. He received a standing ovation before taking the 9:07 p.m. train that night back to Manhattan. A plaque now stands at the site in Bridgeport where he gave the speech.

=== P.T. Barnum ===
The city's most famous resident has been circus-promoter and once-mayor P.T. Barnum, who built four houses in the city (Iranistan and Waldemere were the most renowned) and housed his circus in-town during winters. The Barnum Museum, housed in a building that was originally contracted for construction by P. T. Barnum himself, has an extensive collection related to P. T. Barnum and the history of Bridgeport. In 1949, Bridgeport initiated a Barnum Day parade which has grown into an annual multi-day festival. Barnum, as well as many other notables, is buried in Mountain Grove Cemetery, Bridgeport, in the park-like setting he designed.

=== Expansion of parks ===
The 4 acres (16,000 m^{2}) of Washington Park in East Bridgeport were first set aside as a park in 1851 by William H. Noble and P. T. Barnum, with the land being deeded to the city in 1865. As the city rapidly grew in population, residents recognized the need for more public parks. In 1863, The Standard urged the creation of one or more public parks in the city and a movement to create a park along Long Island Sound and Black Rock Harbor began. By 1864, Barnum and other residents had donated approximately 35 acres (140,000 m^{2}) to create Seaside Park, gradually increased to about 100 acres (400,000 m^{2}) by 1884. In 1878, James W. Beardsley, a wealthy farmer, donated over 100 acres (400,000 m^{2}) of hilly, rural land bordering on the Pequonnock River with a distant view of Long Island Sound to the city of Bridgeport on condition that "the city shall accept and keep the same forever as a public park...." In 1881, the city contracted Frederick Law Olmsted, famous for creating New York City's Central Park, to create a design for Beardsley Park. Olmsted described the existing land as "pastoral, sylvan and idyllic" and, in 1884, delivered his plan for a simple, rural park for the residents to enjoy: "[The land donated by Beardsley] is thoroughly rural and just such a countryside as a family of good taste and healthy nature would resort to, if seeking a few hours' complete relief from scenes associated with the wear and tear of ordinary town life.... It is a better picnic ground than any possessed by the city of New York, after spending twenty million on parks.... The object of any public outlay upon it should be to develop and bring out these distinctive local advantages, and make them available to extensive use in the future by large numbers of people." Bridgeport's parks were not all just for picnics and promenades. Newfield Park was the home of a minor league baseball team, the Bridgeport Orators who won their league's championship in 1904. Over time, more parks and attractions were added including 35-acre (140,000 m^{2}) Beechwood Park, a zoo established in a portion of Beardsley Park and Pleasure Beach, home to a popular amusement park for many years.

=== Late 19th century ===
Bridgeport annexed Black Rock and its busy harbor in 1870. The annexation added Black Rock Harbor Light to the city's navigation aids and, in 1874, Penfield Reef Light was soon added on the south side of Black Rock harbor. Bridgeport harbor remained active and Tongue Point Light was constructed in 1895 to mark its west boundary.

In the late 19th century, Bridgeport became the county seat of Fairfield County. County government was abolished in Connecticut in 1960, but the Fairfield County Courthouse built in 1888 still stands as testimony to that time in Bridgeport's history.

== Early 20th century ==
In 1902, rail traffic was simplified with the addition of the Pequonnock River Railroad Bridge. Trolley service also came to Bridgeport and, in 1910, a major repair and storage facility, the Connecticut Railway and Lighting Company Car Barn, was constructed in downtown Bridgeport.

Historical population of Bridgeport
1810	1,089
1820	1,500
1830	2,800
1840	4,570
1850	7,560
1860	13,299
1870	19,835
1880	29,148
1890	48,866
1900	70,996
1910	102,054
1920	143,555
1930	146,716
1940	147,121
1950	158,709
1960	156,748
1970	156,542
1980	142,546
1990	141,686
2000	139,529
2009	137,298 (est.)

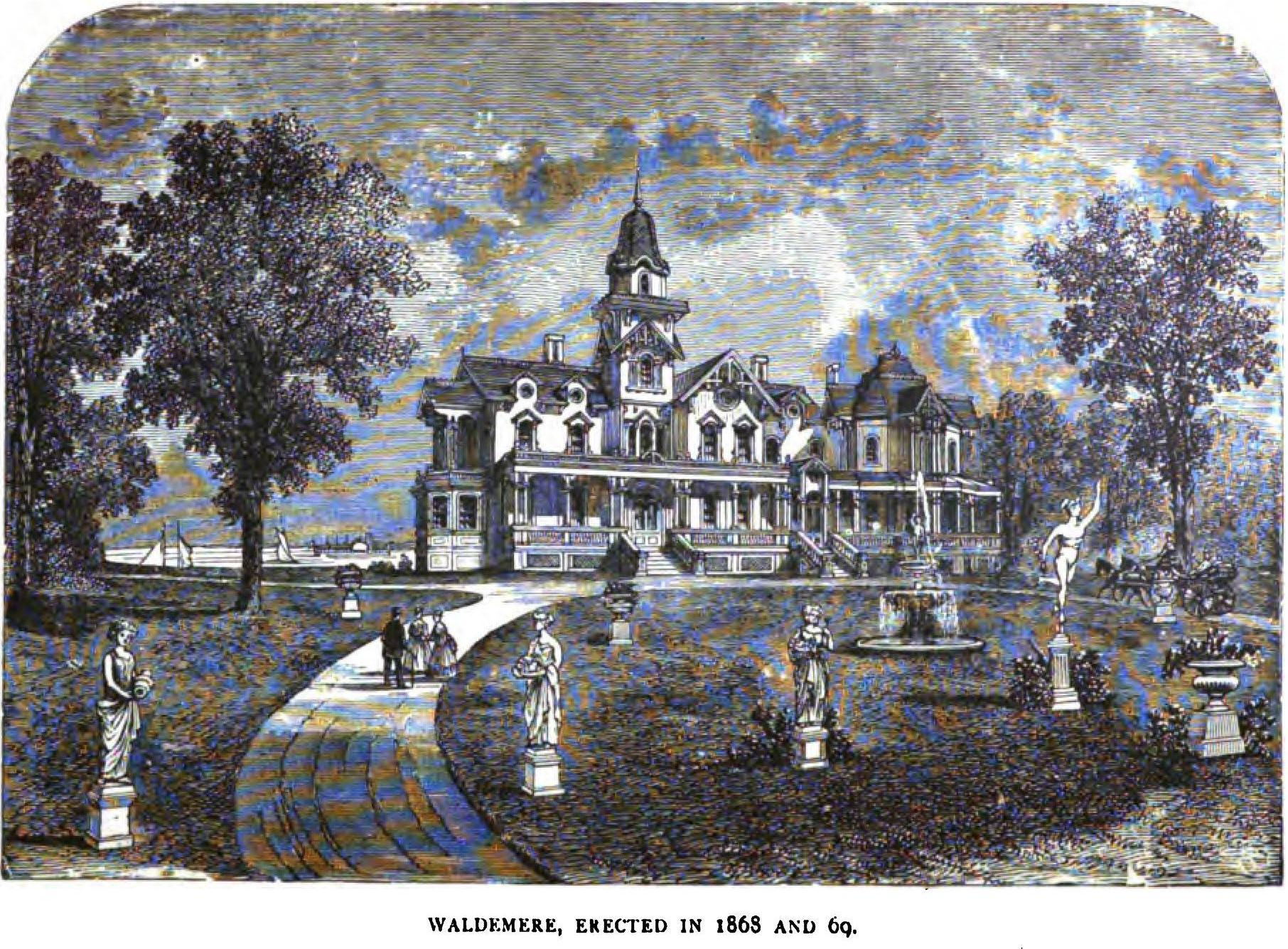
Waldemere, Barnum's Residence after 1869

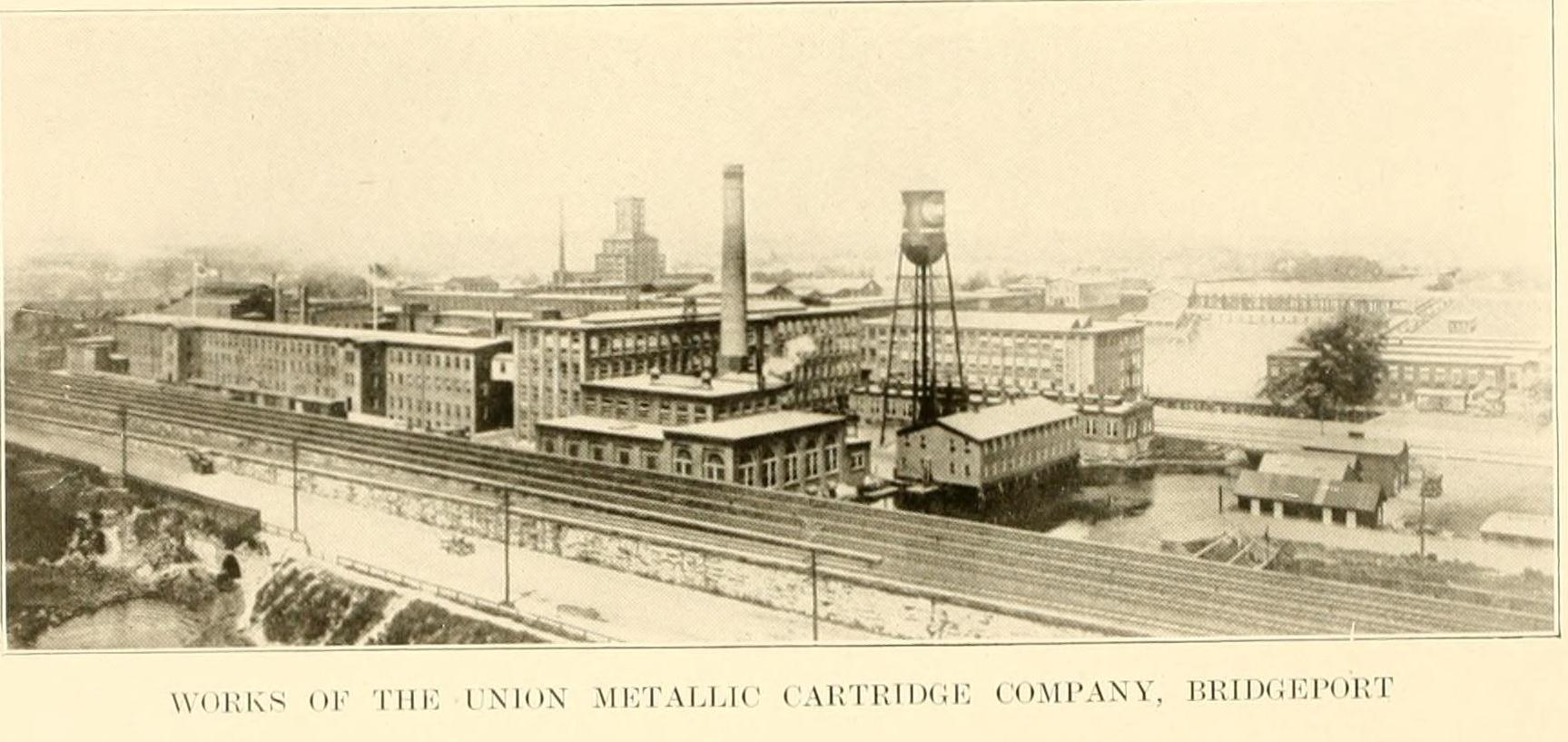
Union Metallic Cartridge plant, before 1917

=== Industrial and commercial growth ===
The city rapidly industrialized in the late-19th century, and became a manufacturing center producing such goods as the famous Bridgeport milling machine, brass fittings, carriages, sewing machines, saddles, and ammunition. Some employers took steps beyond paying wages for the benefit of their employees, such as the Warner Brothers Corset Company which built the Seaside Institute as a social and educational facility for its women workers.

The New York sporting goods firm of Schuyler, Hartley & Graham selected Bridgeport for the site of their Union Metallic Cartridge Company ammunition factory in 1867. The factory became headquarters of Remington UMC in 1912. With the start of World War I in Europe in 1914, Bridgeport became a new world arsenal some called "the Essen of America" and Bridgeport's population exploded, growing by nearly 50 percent in a 20-month period. After receiving an order from the Russian Empire in 1915 for one million rifles with 400,000,000 cartridges, Remington UMC built a factory complex of thirteen buildings with 80 acres of floor space; and hired 1,500 new workers per month until 17,000 were engaged in arms production. The Russian order was nearing completion when the Russian Revolution deposed Czar Nicholas II and refused to pay for the rifles and ammunition. The factory complex exceeded the needs of Remington UMC after Armistice Day, and was used by General Electric after 1920.

By 1930 Bridgeport was a thriving industrial center with more than 500 factories and a booming immigrant population. World War II provided a further boost to the city's industries. Famous factories included Wheeler & Wilson, which produced sewing machines and exported them throughout the world, Remington UMC, Bridgeport Brass, General Electric Company, American Graphophone Company (Columbia Records), Warner Brothers Corset Company (Warnaco) and the Locomobile Company of America, builder of one of the premier automobiles in the early years of the century. The city was home to the Frisbie Pie Company from 1871 to 1958, and therefore it has been argued that Bridgeport is the birthplace of the frisbee. In another "first", Bridgeport had the first dental hygiene school in the country, opened in 1913 by Dr. Alfred Fones with a first class of 34 women.

Bridgeport saw commercial development too, such as the formation of several banks and commercial establishments like D. M. Read's department store in its thriving downtown. In 1933, Lawrence Hoyt, who later went on to found Waldenbooks got his start in the book business when he opened up a small book rental business in a corner of Read's. The city is also home to the first Subway Restaurant, opened in 1965, at 5 corners on North Main Street and Jewett, Tesiny and Beechmont Avenues.

A rapidly expanding Bridgeport also needed more and modern schools, such as Maplewood School, built in 1893 and expanded several times thereafter, Central High School built in 1876 as Bridgeport High School, Warren Harding High School (1924) and Bassick High School (1929).

=== Labor unrest ===
Rapidly growing industry led to labor unrest. As a city planning consultant put it, "Wages have risen, but so have rents, the price of real estate and the cost of living," going on to give an example a worker earning the prevailing wage whose family had been turned out on the street when unable to meet a 25 percent increase in rent. In the summer of 1915, a series of strikes demanding the eight-hour day began in Bridgeport. They were so successful that they spread throughout the Northeast. While thousands took part in the Bridgeport strikes of 1915, few were actually union members and many were women who had been denied membership in craft unions. For instance, the Bryant Electric Company strike was started by five hundred women assemblers and a handful of men who walked off the job. The other workers joined the strike and after two weeks the company acceded to the workers' demands for an eight-hour day, overtime pay and union representation. Similar strikes with similar results played out at factories throughout the city and in the course of a few months, Bridgeport was transformed into an eight-hour day city. Bridgeport came out of World War I and its wartime strikes with a radicalized labor force which, in combination with the labor troubles of the Great Depression, ultimately led to socialist Jasper McLevy occupying city hall from 1933 to 1957.

=== Immigration ===
Bridgeport's industrial growth was fueled by, and attracted, immigration from overseas. By 1920, 32.4 percent of the population was foreign born with another 40.4 percent being the children of immigrants. As for the labor force, 73 percent were foreign born. The immigrant neighborhoods were located mostly south of the railroad line, near the factories and to the shore and included Eastern and Southern Europeans, Scandinavians and Irish. At this point, African Americans constituted 1.6 percent of Bridgeport's population.

A growing city needed more housing and developers provided it, such as the Irish working-class neighborhood of Sterling Hill, the 1880s rental units now preserved as the Bassickville Historic District and the World War I emergency housing for workers that now constitutes the Black Rock Gardens Historic District. The new immigrants wanted their own houses of worship, too, such as the Polish community's St. Michael's built in the East Side in 1907 and the Hungarian Jewish communities Achavath Achim Synagogue built in the West End in 1926.

By the early 1900s, the city was home to a sizable Hungarian American community. Many Hungarian Americans in Bridgeport, including women, worked in industrial jobs such as metalworking.

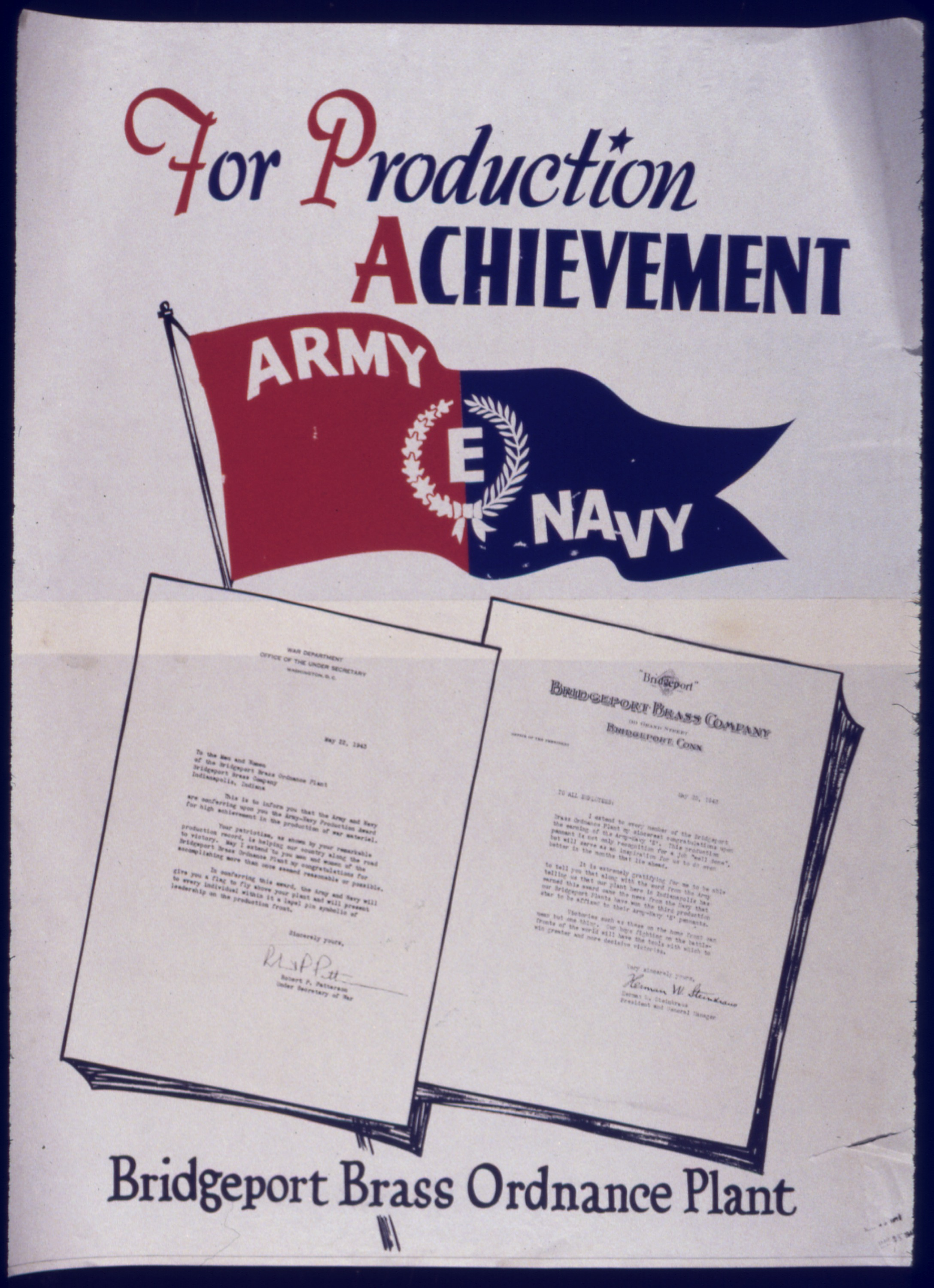
Bridgeport Brass WWII poster

== Late 20th century and deindustrialization ==
Like other urban centers in Connecticut, Bridgeport fared less well during the deindustrialization of the United States in the 1970s and 1980s. Suburban flight as well as overall mismanagement, for which several city officials were convicted, contributed to the decline.

The construction of Interstate 95 in the 1950s demolished many homes throughout Bridgeport, including a largely Hungarian neighborhood in the city's West End.

From the mid-1960s through the early 1990s, Bridgeport was one of the most dangerous cities in Connecticut. As with many urban New England cities, such as New Haven and Hartford, the city had a high crime and murder rate. In following years, Bridgeport soon became ravaged by urban blight. A large white flight occurred in the city, as it started to become a much more dangerous place to work and live. Soon, the population of the city declined as many companies began laying off their employees, thus dropping city employment rate. The total population dropped from 158,709 in 1950 to 141,686 in 1990.

Bridgeport suffered from acute economic inequality during the late 20th century. Much of Bridgeport's violent crime during the late 20th century were concentrated in a handful of public housing complexes, which were described by The New York Times as overcrowded, dilapidated, and "virtual incubators for crime". Conversely, the city's downtown remained highly desirable, and home to numerous corporate offices. Public housing projects seriously affected by crime during this period included Beardsley Terrace/Trumbull Gardens Apartments in the city's North End, P.T. Barnum Apartments on the West Side, Pequonnock Apartments and Marina Village in the South End, the Green Apartments in the Hollow, and Father Panik Village. Father Panik Village opened in 1939 as the first public housing project in New England, and the sixth largest public housing project in the county, located in the Lower East Side. However, by the late 1970s, the complex faced serious neglect, and the city failed to provide it with public services such as police patrols and garbage collection. A high amount of violent crime transpired in the complex in subsequent years. In 1982, Bridgeport Housing Authority's projects were deemed deplorable by federal officials and eventually placed the Housing Authority on the country's "troubled list". By 1986, the city began vacating and demolishing the complex. The final buildings were demolished in late 1993.

By the late 1970s and early 1980s, amid sustained population loss, the city experienced a wave of arson, particularly among older wooden tenement houses, many of which were partially or completely unoccupied. Fires often occurred in the city's East Side. At the time, the city's fire department was significantly understaffed, experienced a hiring freeze amid a lawsuit surrounding discriminatory hiring practices, and generally lacked funding. City officials often struggled at this time to coax witnesses into coming forward due to systemic mistrust, and one Bridgeport Fire Department Lieutenant called Bridgeport's arson problem "a microcosm of the Bronx". At certain points, the city experienced as many as eight arson incidents in a single night.

In the fall of 1978, Bridgeport's public school teachers went a strike that garnered national attention, demanding higher wage increases, class sizes, and an introduction specialist staff such as art, music, and gym teachers. Bridgeport teachers at the time had among the lowest average wages in the state. Teachers' strikes in Connecticut were illegal at that time, but were common in Bridgeport and other cities and town, resulting in teachers being jailed. When the school year began, on September 6th, just 36 of Bridgeport's 1,247 teachers showed up to school, and only about 10% of students entered the city's public schools. Early in the course of the strike, teachers picketed a school bus depot in an attempt to stop school buses from leaving to pick up students. Representatives of the local Amalgamated Transit Union said their bus drivers would honor the picket line, but buses eventually began traveling after the Bridgeport Police Department ordered them to, although few students were picked up. The government's response was harsh, with 274 teachers, about 20% of all city teachers, being arrested by the police. The arrested male teachers were initially sent to the New Haven Correctional Center, while the arrested female teachers were initial sent to the Niantic Correctional Institution, where they were strip searched and sprayed with a delousing chemical. The imprisoned teachers were then sent by the busload, sometimes via school buses, to Camp Hartell, a converted National Guard camp in Windsor Locks. As more teachers were jailed and sent to Camp Hartell, the camp was sent to capacity, and the government began running out of space to imprison teachers. Teachers from other districts began descending on the camp to support the imprisoned teachers. On September 24th, after 19 days, the strike was settled with the city, which some speculate was caused by orders to arrest the daughter of then-Mayor John Mandanici in the strike. The teachers were fined $350 per day for the strike, and the union was fined $10,000 per day. The following year, the state of Connecticut passed a binding arbitration law, which led to the end of teacher strikes in the state. After the strike, class sizes shrunk, specialists were hired. In the following two years, teachers won pay raises of 6.0% and 7.5%, respectively, higher than the city's offer of 5.0%, but lower than the union's proposed increase of over 10.0%. A number of commentators have cited the strike as a pivotal moment in labor history in Bridgeport, and in Connecticut as a whole.

Various prominent manufacturing companies relocated out of Bridgeport during this time.

Martin Luther King Jr., who spoke three times at the Klein Auditorium in 1961, 1964 and 1966 and at Central High School in 1962.

In 1987, the L'Ambiance Plaza, a residential project which was under construction at the time, collapsed, killing 28 construction workers. It was the worst disaster the city had faced at that point and one of the worst in Connecticut. Emergency crews from around New England responded to assist Bridgeport's Fire and Police Departments in the rescue and recovery effort.

In 1991, the city filed for bankruptcy protection but was declared solvent by a federal court.

== 21st century ==
While Bridgeport has seen population growth in the 21st century, problems of violent crime, poverty, and corruption have persisted.

A number large-scale projects have been proposed, and completed in Bridgeport's downtown. In July 2021, the city opened the Hartford HealthCare Amphitheater, a large outdoor amphitheater that hosts concerts. Numerous large projects have been proposed for the city's Steel Point section, including two separate proposals to build a casino, although plans have been hampered by industrial contamination in the area's soil.

During the 21st century, many of Bridgeport's historic buildings have been converted to residential uses. In 2004, the former flagship store of Read's Department Stores on Broad Street was converted into a place for artists to live and work. In 2007, the former headquarters of regional bank Citytrust Bancorp was converted to a 117-unit apartment building. The Great Recession hurt Bridgeport's economy, including real estate development, which saw numerous projects halted and slowed down. In 2009, the City Council approved a new master plan for development designed both to promote redevelopment in selected areas and to protect existing residential neighborhoods. In 2010, the Bridgeport Housing Authority and a local health center announced plans to build a $20 million medical and housing complex at Albion Street, making use of federal stimulus funds and designed to replace some of the housing lost with the demolition of Father Panik Village.

Then-President George W. Bush spoke before a small, selected group of Connecticut business people and officials about health care reform at the Playhouse on the Green, just across the street from McLevy Hall, in 2006.

== Gallery ==
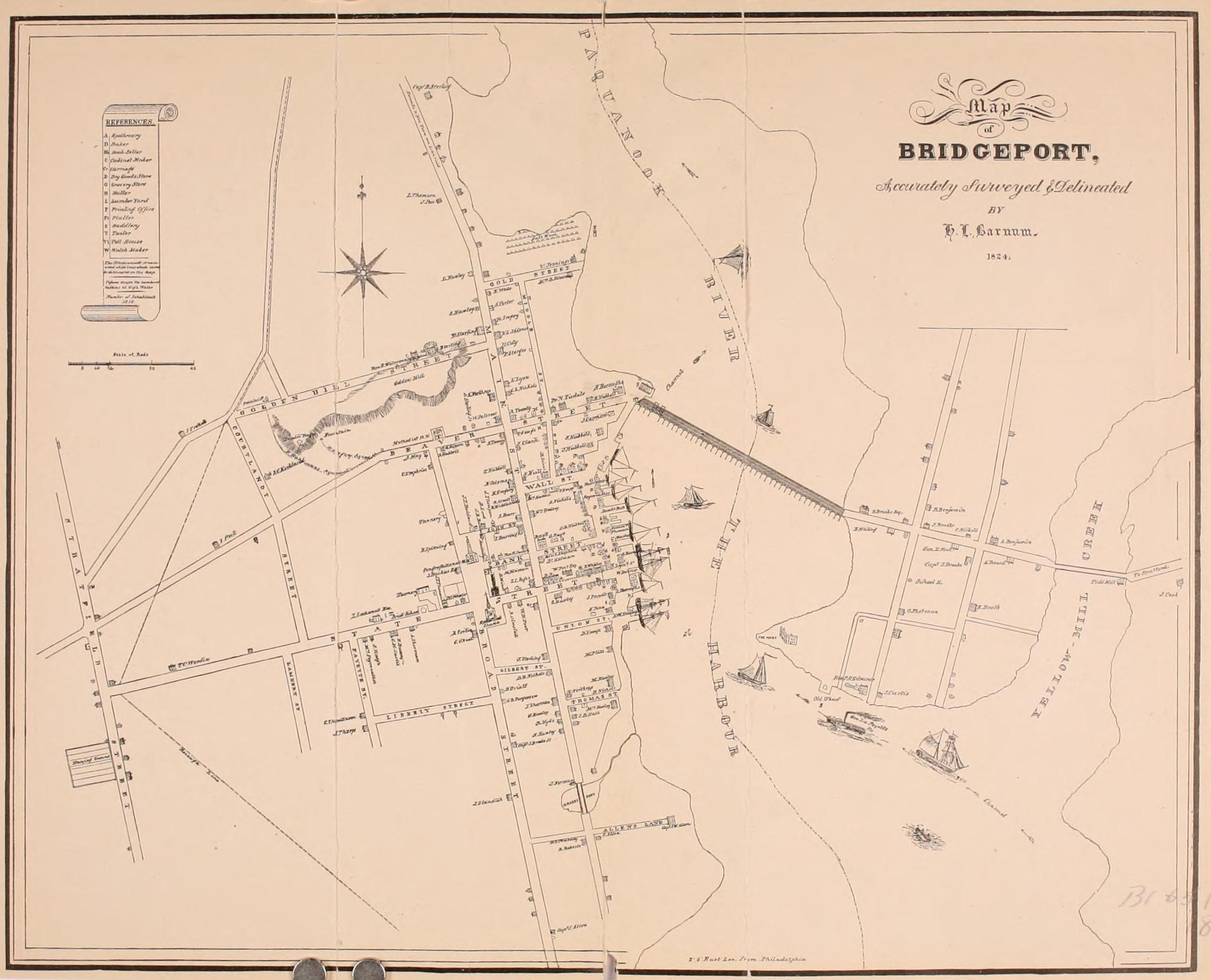
Bridgeport in 1824 by H.L. Barnum

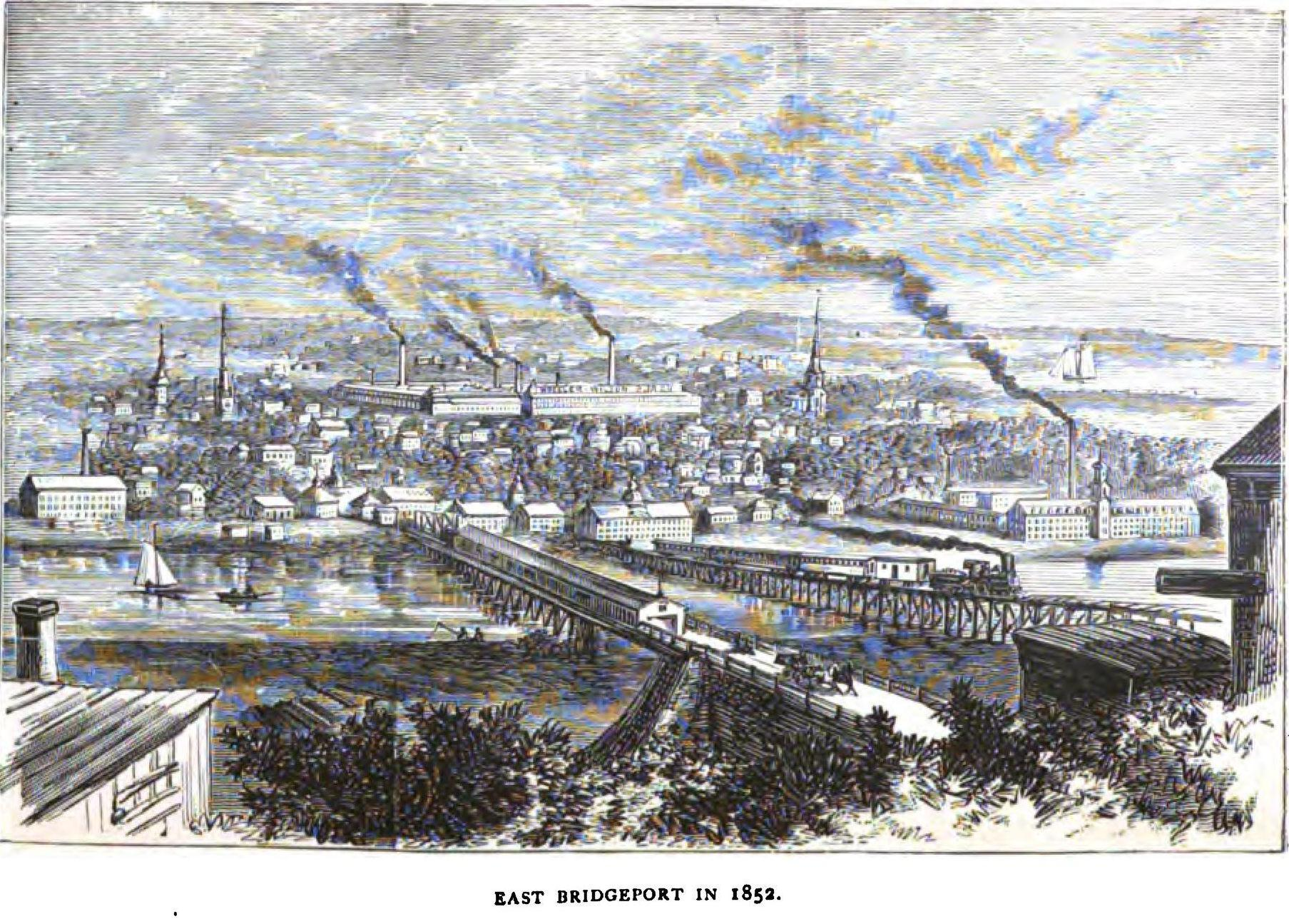
East Bridgeport, 1852

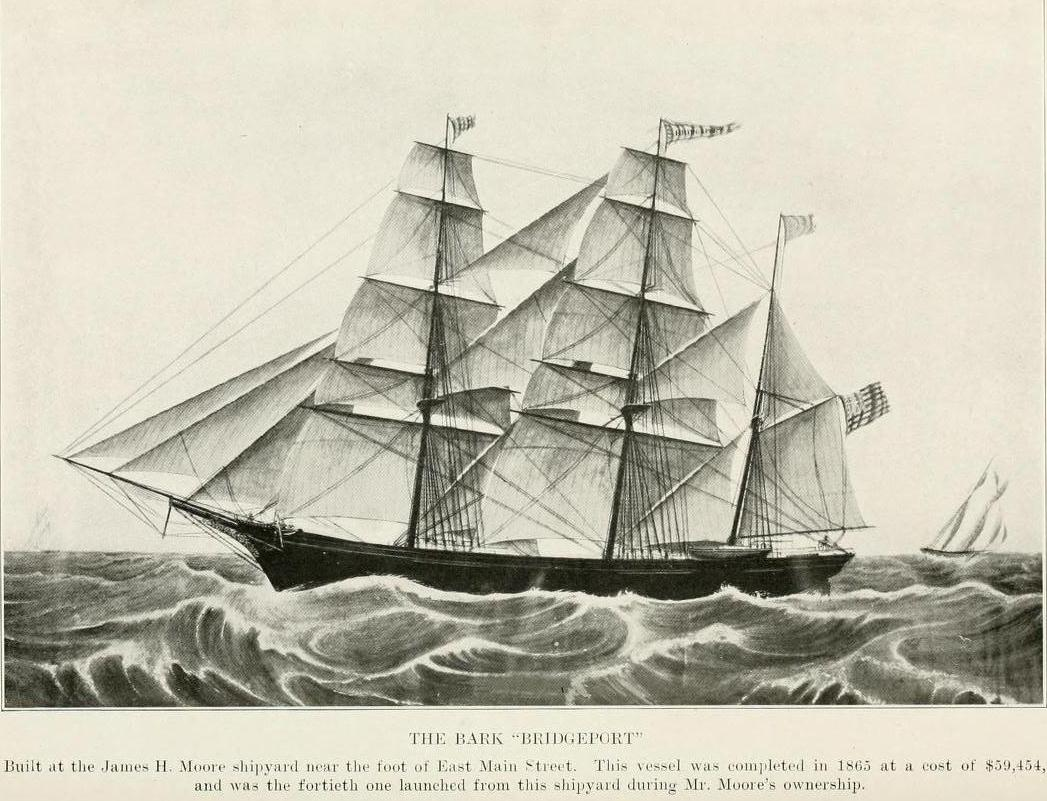
Bark "Bridgeport" built near the foot of East Main St., completed 1865

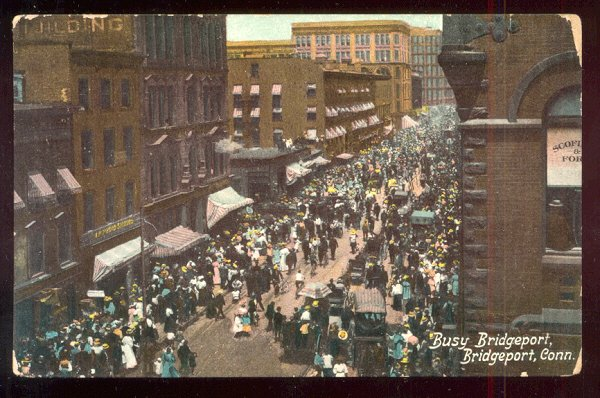
Downtown, about 1910

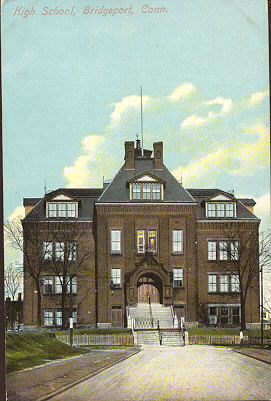
High School, about 1910

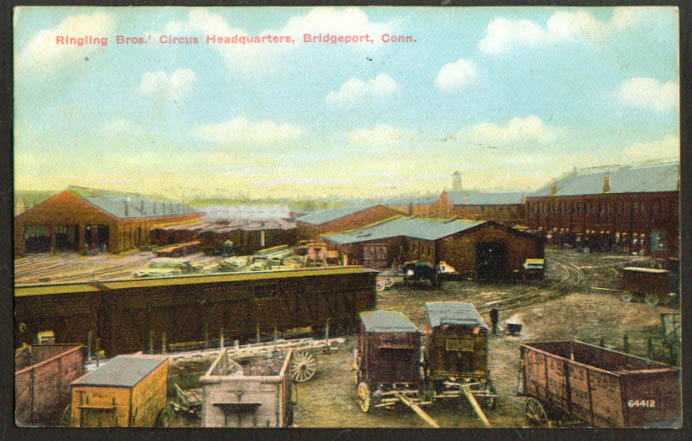
Ringling Brothers Circus headquarters, about 1911

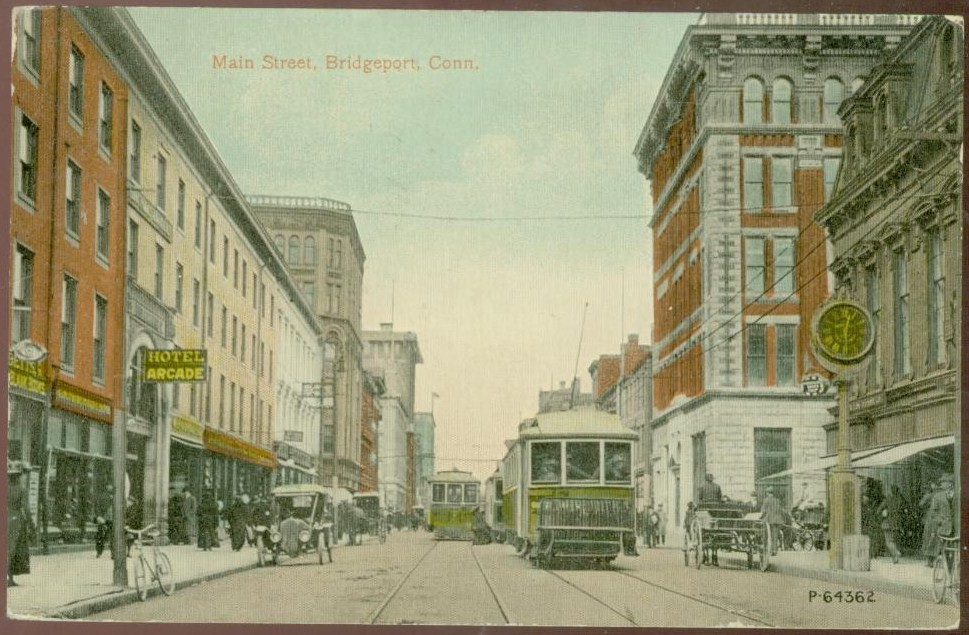
Main Street, 1912

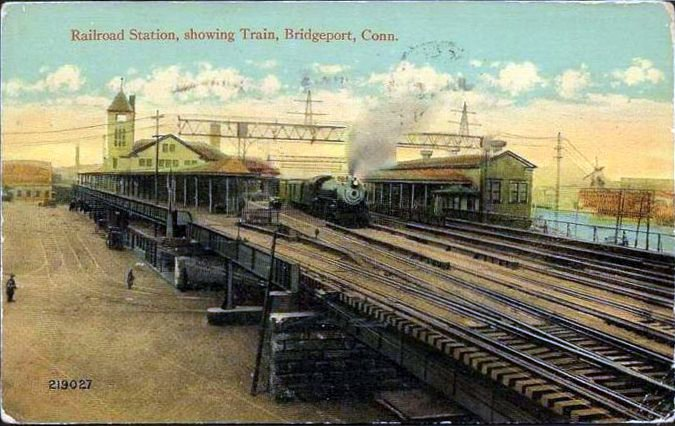
Train Station. 1914

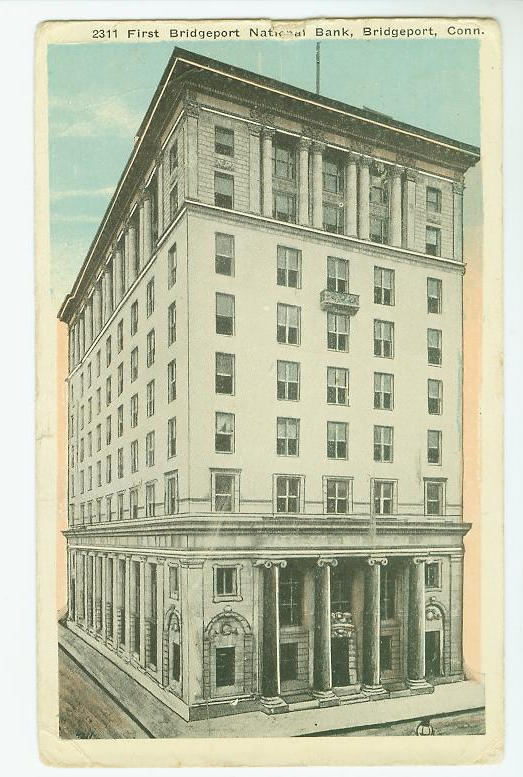
Bank building, 1916

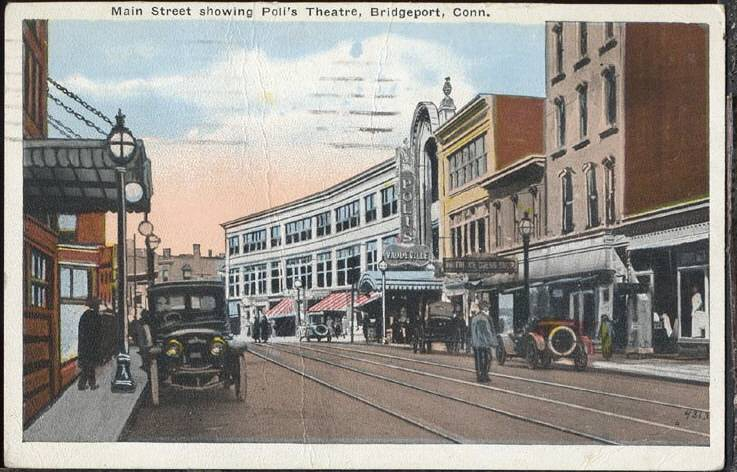
Main Street, showing Poli's Theatre, from a postcard sent in 1921

== See also ==
- National Register of Historic Places listings in Bridgeport, Connecticut
- List of people from Bridgeport, Connecticut
