= Sterling Hill Historic District =

Sterling Hill Historic District may refer to:

- Sterling Hill Historic District (Bridgeport, Connecticut), listed on the NRHP in Connecticut
- Sterling Hill Historic District (Plainfield and Sterling, Connecticut), listed on the NRHP in Connecticut
