= Bridgeport International Academy =

Coordinates: 41.1673°N 73.1881°W

Location
- 285 Lafayette Street; Bridgeport, Connecticut 06604; United States

Information
- Type: Private secondary
- Established: 1997 (29 years ago)
- CEEB code: 070060
- Principal: Emily Kise
- Grades: 9-12
- Website: www.bridgeportacademy.org

Bridgeport International Academy (BIA) is a private college preparatory school in Bridgeport, Connecticut. The school is located adjacent to the seaside campus of the University of Bridgeport. Students have the opportunity to take college courses and use university facilities.

== History ==
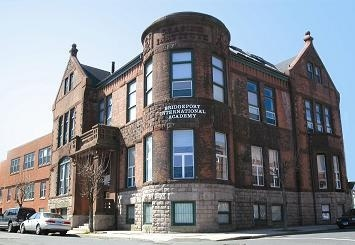
View of the school building, April 2011

On March 9, 2007, BIA was again granted state approval as a nonpublic school by the State of Connecticut. On March 15, 2007, Bridgeport International Academy was elected to institutional membership and was granted accreditation for ten years by the New England Association of Schools and Colleges.

== Facilities ==
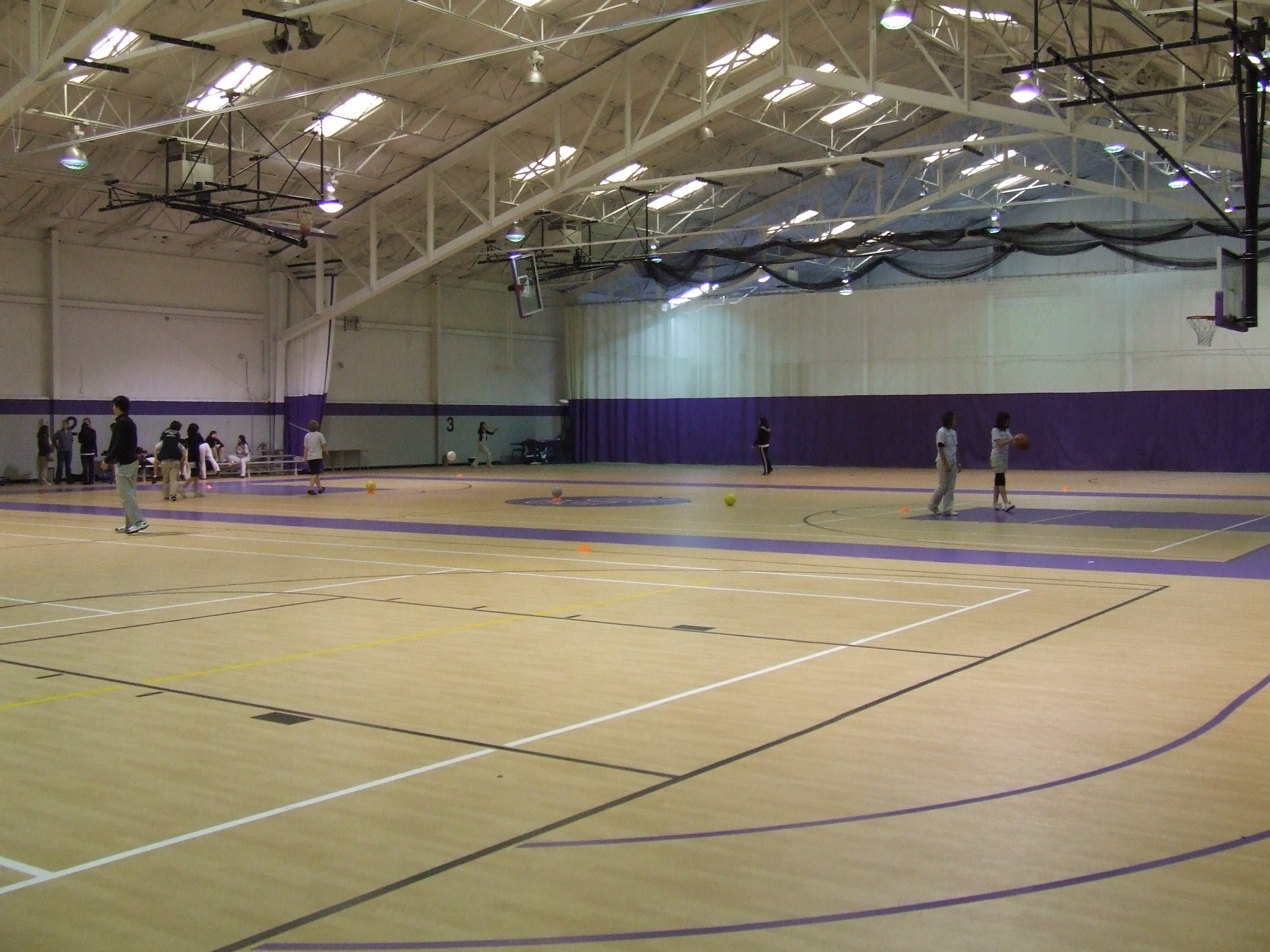
Wheeler Recreation Center

Bridgeport International Academy is located on 285 Lafayette Street, Bridgeport, Connecticut. The school has two dorms, one for boys and one for girls.

Through an arrangement with the University of Bridgeport, BIA students, faculty and administrative staff have access to the following university facilities: The Marina Dining Hall, The Magnus Wahlstrom Library, The Wheeler Recreation Center, The Arnold Bernhard Arts and Humanities Center, and the University Student Center.

== BIA Affiliation with News 12 Varsity ==
The academy is partnered with MSG VARSITY on Cablevision Channel 14 to cover and promote school activities and events (UCCT).

== See also ==
- University of Bridgeport
