= Warren R. Briggs =

American architect (1850–1933)

Warren Richard Briggs
- Born: 1850; Malden, Massachusetts, U.S.
- Died: 1933 (aged 82–83); Stratford, Connecticut, U.S.
- Occupation: Architect
- Buildings: Bridgeport High School, New Britain State Normal School, Taunton High School, Fairfield County Courthouse (Bridgeport), Seaside Institute, Willimantic City Hall/Windham County Courthouse, Fairfield County Courthouse (Danbury)

Lavinia L. Parmly House, Bridgeport, 1890.

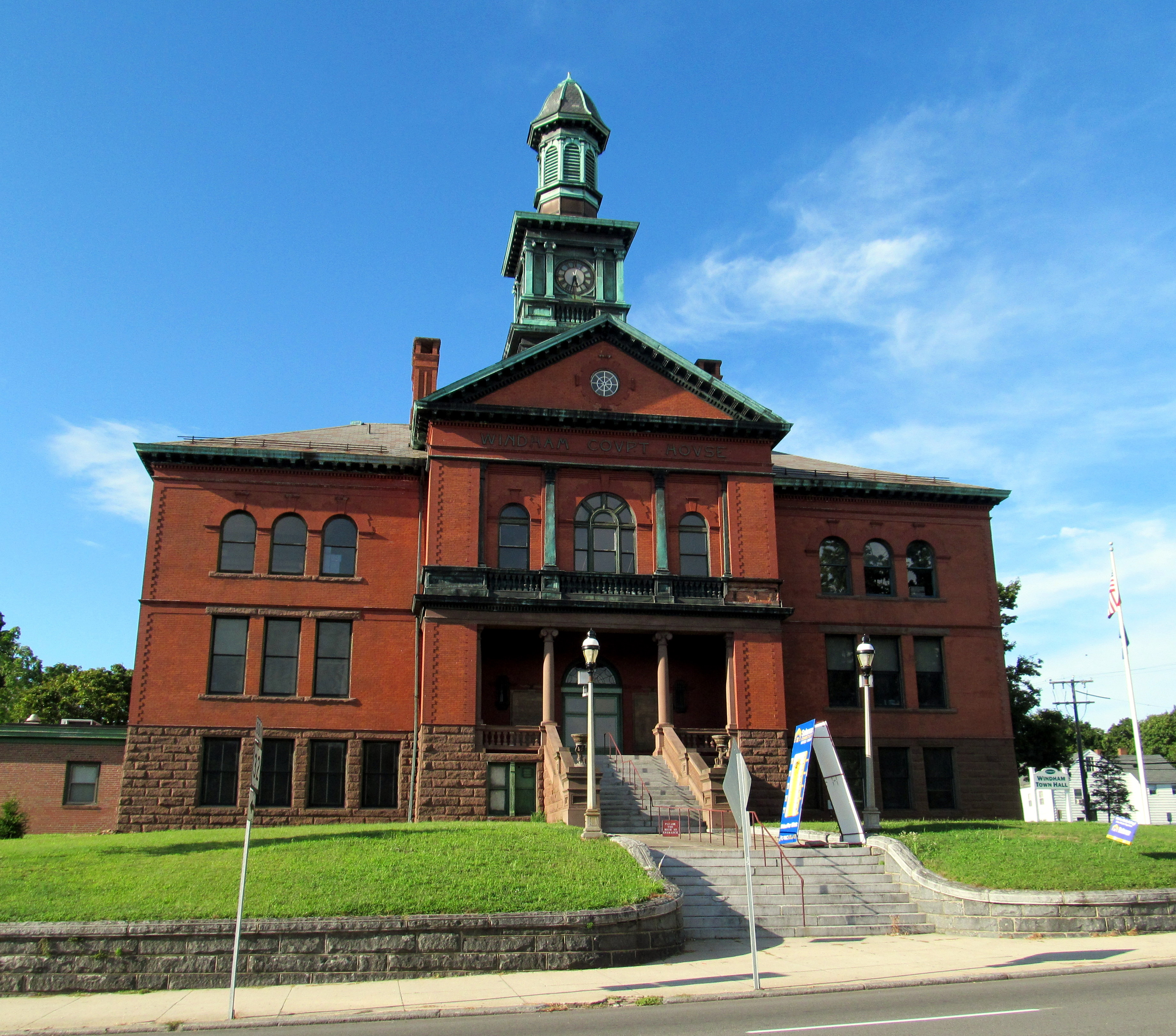
Willimantic City Hall/Windham County Courthouse, Willimantic, 1895.

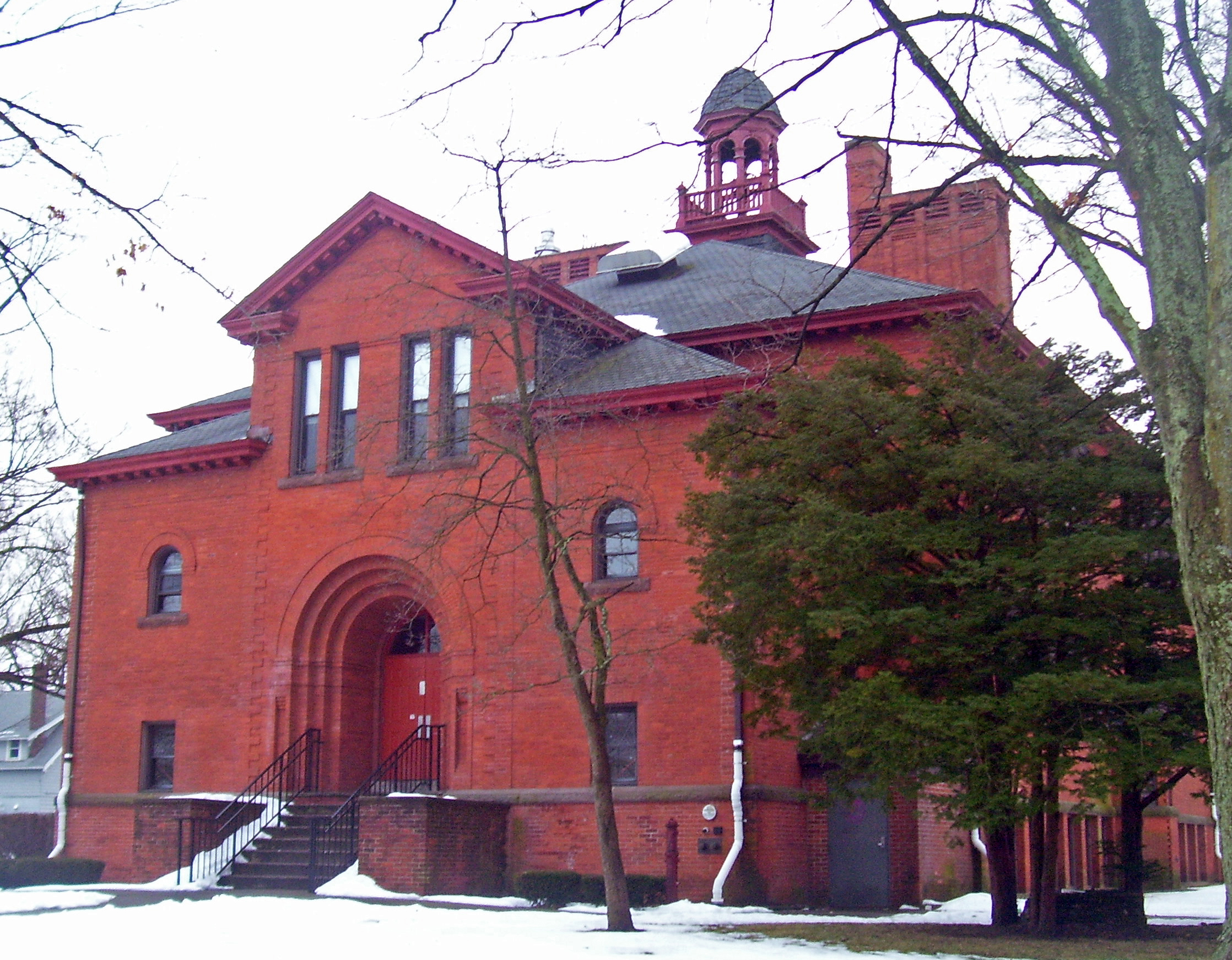
Locust Avenue School, Danbury, 1896.

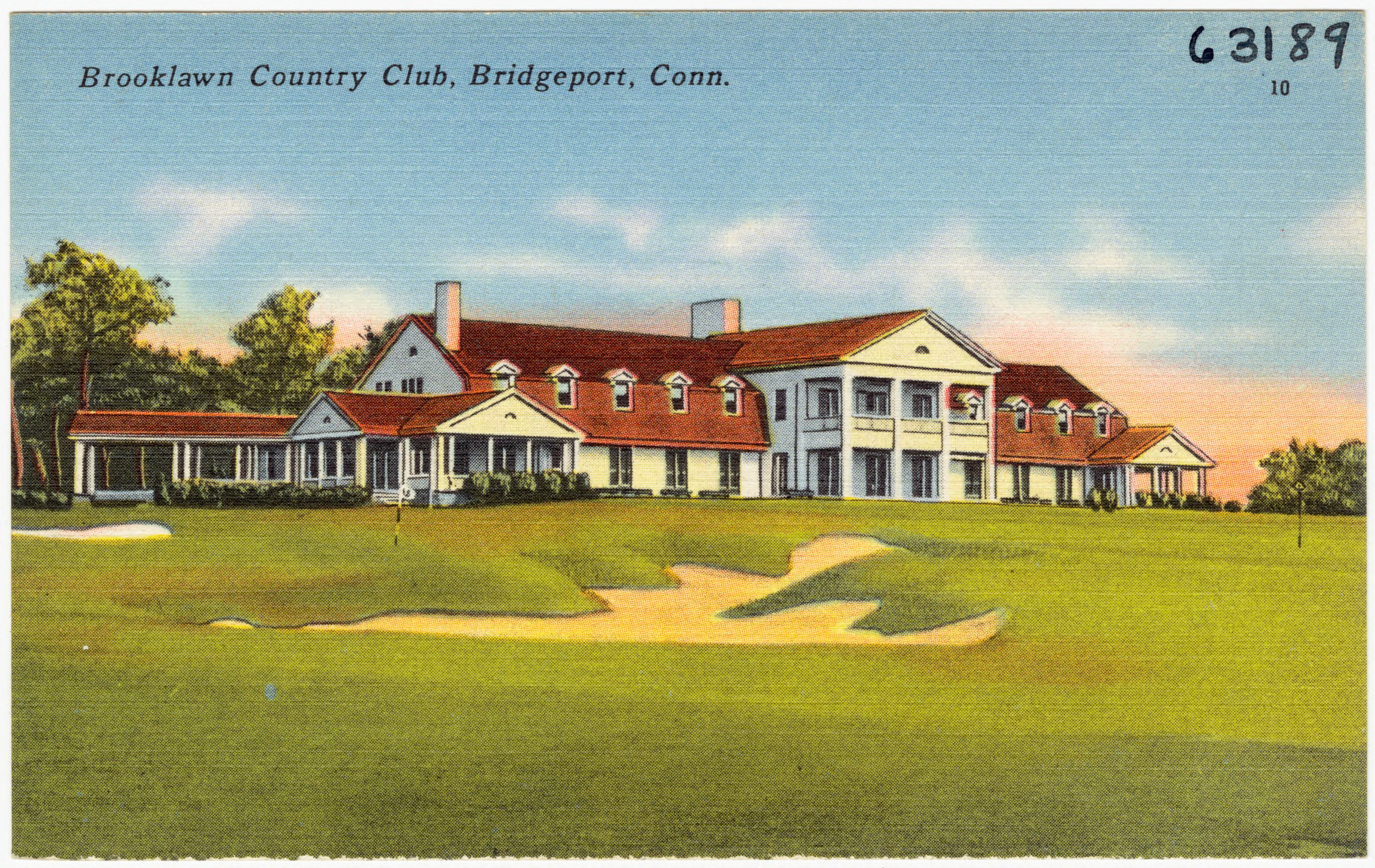
Brooklawn Country Club, Fairfield, 1915.

Warren R. Briggs (1850–1933) was an American architect who worked in Bridgeport, Connecticut.

== Biography ==
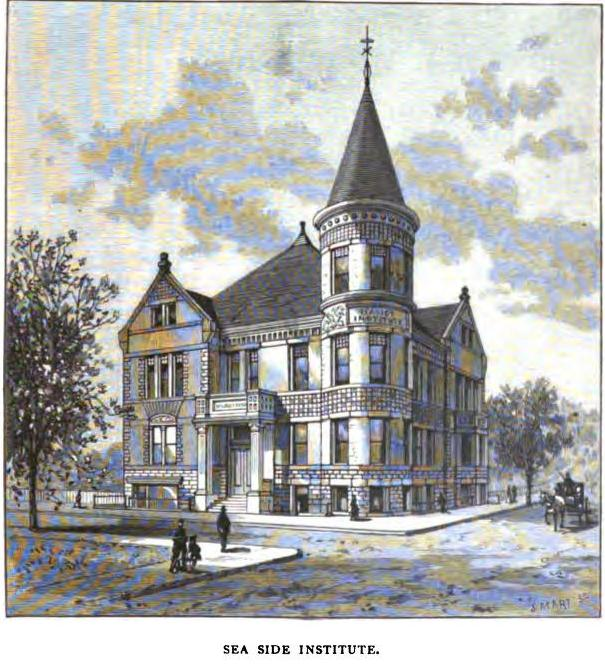
Seaside Institute, Bridgeport, 1887.

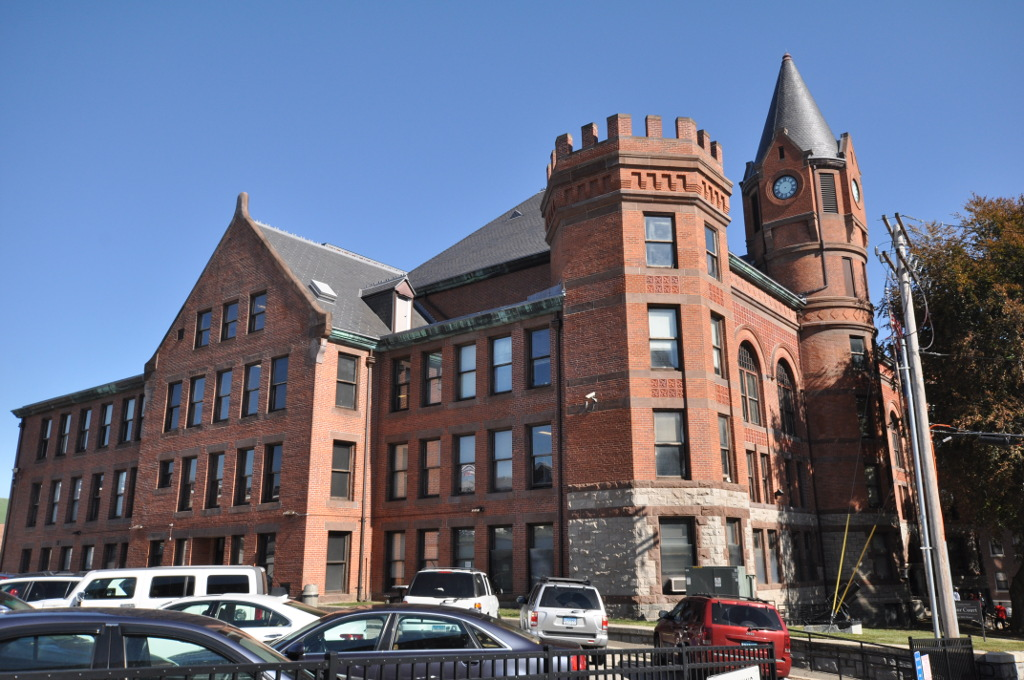
Fairfield County Courthouse, Bridgeport, 1887–88 and 1914–16.

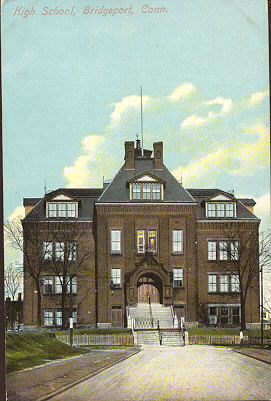
Bridgeport High School, Bridgeport, 1880.

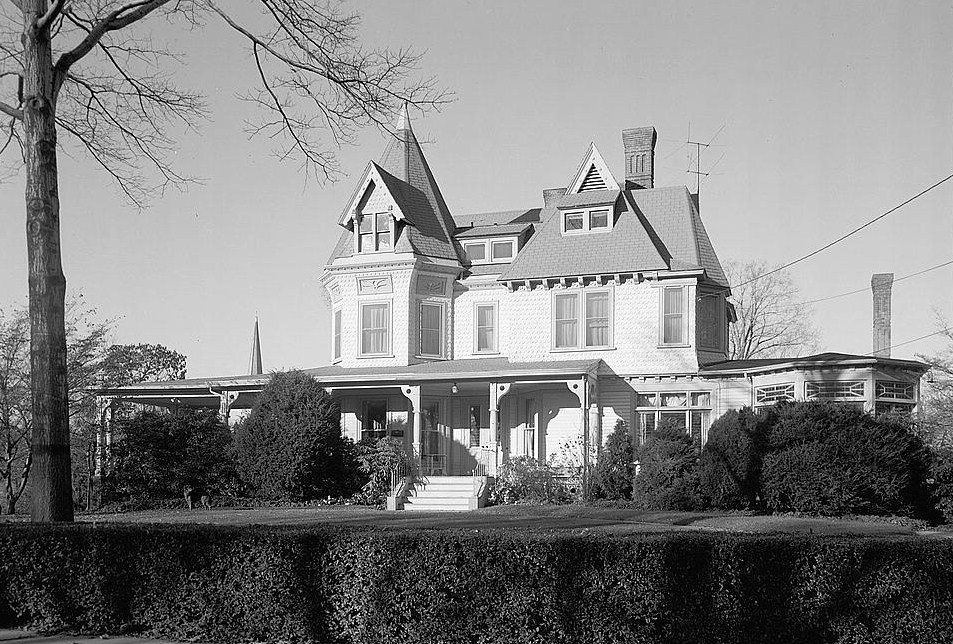
John H. Perry House, Southport, 1880.

Briggs was born 6 June 1850, in Malden, Massachusetts. He attended Harvard University and worked for Boston architects Cummings & Sears. In 1872 he won a scholarship enabling him to attend the Ecole des Beaux-Arts in Paris for two years. He studied there in the atelier of Louis-Jules André, who had also taught Richardson Upon his return in 1874 he secured a position with the noted Boston firm of Peabody & Stearns. In 1876 he began to work for unidentified Bridgeport architect, possibly George Palliser, whose work Briggs' early designs resemble. In 1877 he established an independent practice. In 1878 he submitted designs in the competition for the new Indiana State House in Indianapolis, which were not accepted.

In 1892, Briggs submitted a design for the Connecticut state building at the 1893 Columbian Exposition due to be held in Chicago the following year. The Commissioners responsible for the representation of Connecticut at the Exposition selected his submitted design "for a state building to cost around $10,000". The building was erected at the Exposition grounds in Chicago by the end of 1892 and by the culmination of the Exposition it had seen thousands of visitors pass through its doors and received favourable reviews lauding its "thoroughly homelike structure"

He worked alone until 1914, when he re-established his firm as Briggs & Caldwell, with Edward B. Caldwell, Jr. This firm lasted until 1916 when Caldwell established his own practice, and Briggs returned to his. Briggs has no known works after 1919 or so, possibly retiring after this. He later moved permanently to the town of Stratford, Connecticut, where he died 30 May 1933, at the age of 82. Many of the Briggs & Caldwell-era buildings had Caldwell as primary designer. He became well known as an architect of civic structures, and authored several books on school architecture, most prominent of which was Modern American School Buildings, published in 1899 and reissued in 1909. This work combined new information with that which Briggs had previously published, in book or article form. It was also liberally illustrated with designs by Briggs, both built and not built.

Brigg was a baseball devotee, and played at Harvard while a student there. In 1874, immediately prior to his return to the United States, he organized the first baseball game in England. He is also believed to have assisted in the invention of the catcher's mask.

== Architectural works ==
- Stamford Savings Bank "The Old Red Bank", Stamford, CT
- Sands Seely House, 11 Forest St., Stamford, CT (1878) – Demolished.
- Bridgeport High School, Congress St., Bridgeport, CT (1880) – Demolished.
- John H. Perry House, 134 Center St., Southport, CT (1880)
- C. O. Miller Store, 184 Atlantic St., Stamford, CT (1882) – Altered beyond recognition.
- New Britain State Normal School, 27 Hillside Pl., New Britain, CT (1882) – Now apartments.
- Connecticut State Building, Columbian Exposition Grounds, Chicago, IL (1893) – Dismantled, possibly returned to New Haven.
- Myrtle Avenue School, 325 Myrtle Ave., Bridgeport, CT (1884) – Many of Bridgeport's public schools were built with front lawns. Many schools, including this one, had an addition built there.
- North Avenue School, 1375 North Ave., Bridgeport, CT (1884) – Addition in front.
- Rogers School, 100 Pleasant St., Fairhaven, MA (1884)
- Taunton High School, Washington & N. Pleasant Sts., Taunton, MA (1884) – Demolished.
- United Bank Building, 948 Main St., Bridgeport, CT (1884–85) – Occupied by the Bridgeport National and City Savings Banks. Demolished 1912.
- Danbury National Bank Building, 248 Main St., Danbury, CT (1887–88) – Altered.
- Fairfield County Courthouse, 172 Golden Hill St., Bridgeport, CT (1887–88) – Expanded by Briggs 1914–16.
- Seaside Institute, 299 Lafayette Ave., Bridgeport, CT (1887) – Altered.
- Clinton Avenue School, 287 Clinton Ave., Bridgeport, CT (1888–89) – Addition in front.
- Achille F. Migeon House (Laurelhurst), 215 Forest St., Torrington, CT (1890–91)
- Lavinia L. Parmly House, 219 Park Ave., Bridgeport, CT (1890) – Now Cortright Hall of the University of Bridgeport.
- Meriden City Hall, 142 E. Main St., Meriden, CT (1890–91) – Replaced a building by S. M. Stone. Burned 1904.
- Y. M. C. A. Building, 835 Main St., Bridgeport, CT (1890–91) – Demolished.
- Charles B. Baker House (Greynook), 72 Park Ave., Bridgeport, CT (1891)
- Olivet Congregational Church, 2102 Main St., Bridgeport, CT (1891)
- St. Paul's Universalist Church, 9 Norwood St., Meriden, CT (1891–93)
- Stamford Yacht Club, 97 Ocean Dr. W., Stamford, CT (1891) – Burned 1914.
- Birmingham National Bank Building, 248 Main St., Derby, CT (1892)
- Connecticut State Building, World's Columbian Exposition, Chicago, IL (1892–93) – Demolished.
- Broadview Farm, 72 Hospital Ave., Danbury, CT (1894) – The city almshouse. Demolished.
- Enoch P. Hincks House, 515 Washington Ave., Bridgeport, CT (1894)
- Lincoln School, Stratford & Central Aves., Bridgeport, CT (1895–97) – Demolished.
- Willimantic City Hall & Windham County Courthouse, 979 Main St., Willimantic, CT (1895) – Now the Windham Town Hall.
- Locust Avenue School, 26 Locust Ave., Danbury, CT (1896)
- St. Mary's R. C. School, Elizabeth & Cottage Sts., Derby, CT (1898) – Demolished 1969.
- Bridgeport Protestant Orphan Asylum, Ellsworth St. & Fairfield Ave., Bridgeport, CT (1899–1900) – Demolished.
- Fairfield County Courthouse, 71 Main St., Danbury, CT (1899)
- Boys Club of Bridgeport, 277 Middle St., Bridgeport, CT (1900)
- Department of Police and Public Charities Building, Fairfield Ave. near Courtland St., Bridgeport, CT (1900–01) – Demolished.
- N. Y., N. H., & H. R.R. Station, 710 Water St., Bridgeport, CT (1904) – Demolished.
- Masonic Hall, 16–20 Park Pl., Naugatuck, CT (1907) – Heavily altered.
- Sherman School, Fern St., Southport, CT (1913–14) – Demolished.
- Fairfield County Courthouse (Expansion), 172 Golden Hill St., Bridgeport, CT (1914–16) – Doubled the size of the building.
- Clubhouse, Brooklawn Country Club, 500 Algonquin Rd., Fairfield, CT (1915)
- Dwight C. Wheeler House, 250 Brooklawn Ave., Bridgeport, CT (1915) – Stripped of much detail.
- George W. Hawley House, 108 Lookout Dr. N., Fairfield, CT (1915)
- Southern New England Telephone Co. Building, 2362 Main St., Stratford, CT (1916)
- Stratford Trust Co. Building, 2366 Main St., Stratford, CT (1916)
- City National Bank Building, 929 Main St., Bridgeport, CT (1918) – Demolished.
