= Bassickville Historic District =

Historic district in Connecticut, United States

- U.S. National Register of Historic Places
- U.S. Historic district
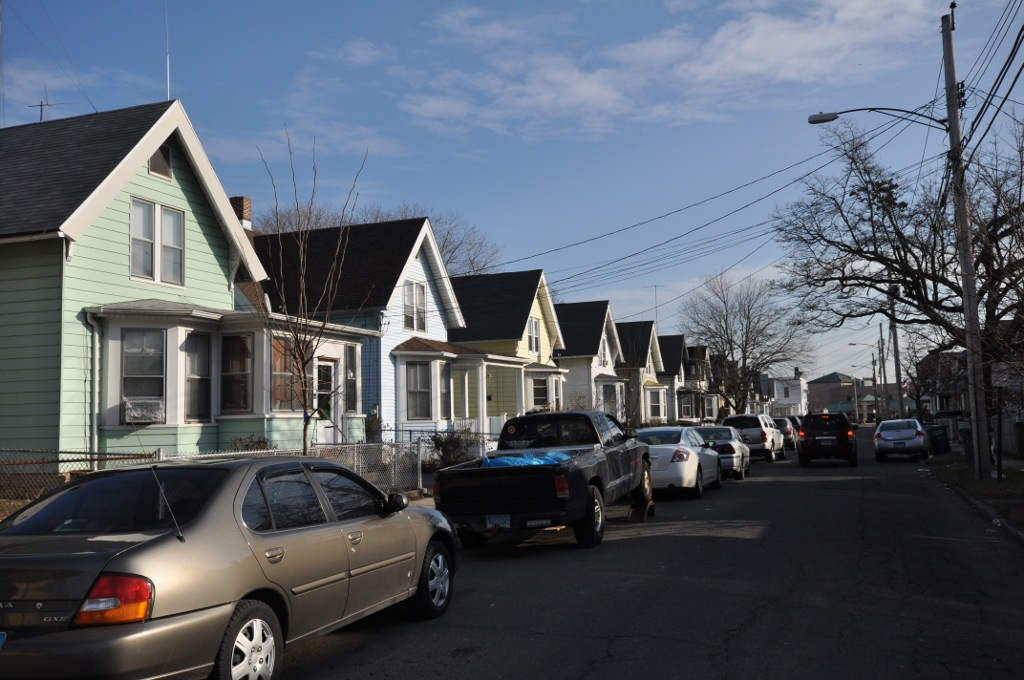
- Bassick Avenue

- Location within Connecticut Location within the United States
- Location: 20-122 Bassick, 667-777 Howard, and 1521-1523 Fairview Avenues, and 1350-1380 State Street, Bridgeport, Connecticut
- Coordinates: 41°10′16″N 73°12′40″W
- Area: 3.4 acres (1.4 ha)
- Architect: Parker, I.W.
- Architectural style: Colonial Revival, Stick/Eastlake
- NRHP reference No.: 87001511
- Added to NRHP: September 08, 1987

Bassickville Historic District is a historic district encompassing a well-preserved late 19th-century residential development on the west side of Bridgeport, Connecticut. Located on Bassick, Howard, and Fairview Avenues, the area was developed as a residential subdivision of worker housing by Edmund Bassick. The development is characterized by nearly identical 1-1/2 story frame cottages exhibiting the Stick style of architecture. The district was listed on the National Register of Historic Places in 1987.

== Description and history ==
Bassickville is located on Bridgeport's west side, occupying all or part of Bassick and Howard Avenues between Fairview Avenue and State Street, as well as a few adjoining properties on those Two Main through Streets. Both sides of Bassick Avenue are lined almost entirely by Bassick's cottages, while the adjacent side of Howard Avenue features several of them. A number of later buildings, mostly residential in character, round out the district. Of all of Bassick's development, all but one building survive. Of 39 buildings in the district, 31 are single-family cottages built by Bassick, and two are duplexes. They are characterized by their cross-gable roofs, decorative Stick elements and finials at the gable ends, bay windows in front and porches to one side, and board-and-batten siding. In some instances, later siding changes have obscured or lost these features, but the uniformity of the development's character is still evident.

The development was the brainchild of Edmund C. Bassick, an entrepreneur who moved to Bridgeport from Chicago in 1880, having made a fortune in the gold mines of the western United States and Australia. It was one first residential developments in the city to feature housing built expressly as rental units. When Bassick began purchasing land in the area, it was little more than scattered housing and farmland. Between 1883 and 1885 he had most of these houses built, hiring I.W. Parker of Waldo, Maine to do the construction. Land that Bassick owner on Hancock Avenue was used as a commercial nursery, and was not developed until after his death in 1898. Most of the early tenants of the development were employed in the building trades; rent was $15 per month.

== See also ==
- History of Bridgeport, Connecticut
- National Register of Historic Places listings in Bridgeport, Connecticut
