= Seaside Institute =

- U.S. National Register of Historic Places
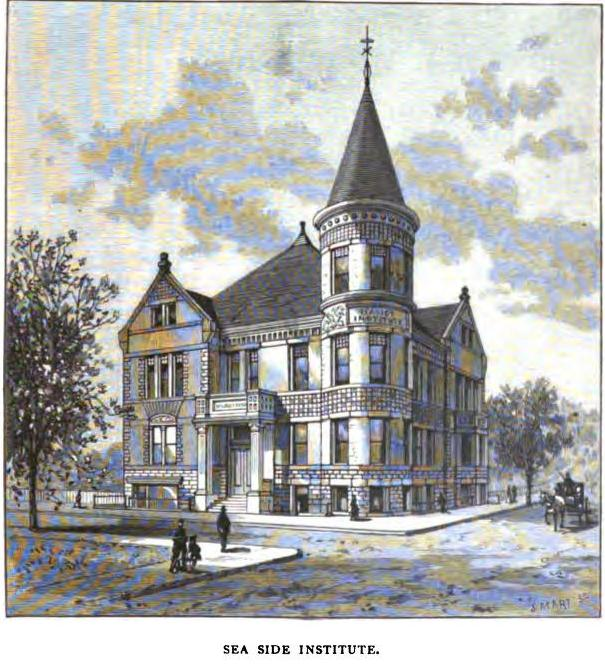

- Location within Connecticut Location within the United States
- Location: 285 Lafayette Street, Bridgeport, Connecticut
- Coordinates: 41.1675°N 73.1883°W
- Built: 1887
- Architect: Warren R. Briggs
- Architectural style: Richardsonian Romanesque
- NRHP reference No.: 82004374
- Added to NRHP: June 14, 1982

The Seaside Institute in Bridgeport, Connecticut is a Richardsonian Romanesque rock-faced granite, brick, brownstone and terracotta building designed by Warren R. Briggs and completed in 1887 at the corner of Lafayette and Atlantic avenues, not far from Seaside Park. Originally built for the use and benefit of the female employees of the Warner Brothers Corset Company, it was listed on the National Register of Historic Places in 1982. The buildings is currently used by the Bridgeport International Academy.

== History ==
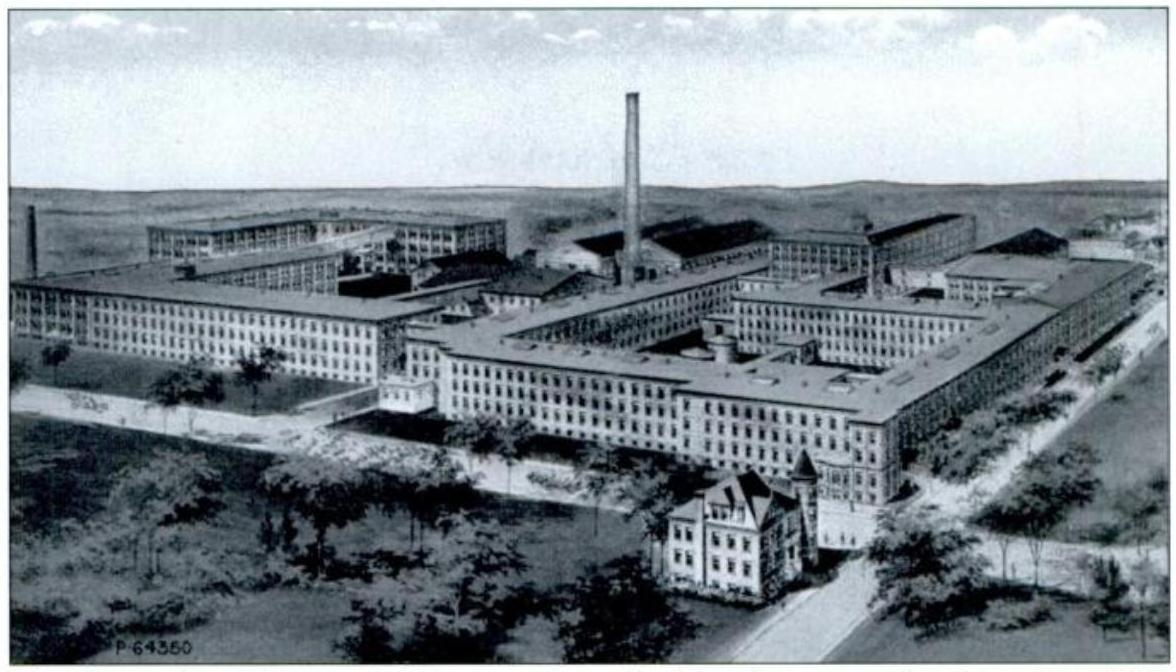
Seaside Institute and Warner Brothers factory, circa 1909

By 1886, the corset factory founded by Drs. I. D. and Lucien C. Warner in Bridgeport employed approximately 1200 people, seven-eighths of whom were women. The Seaside Institute was designed as a dining, lecture and meeting hall with library, music and reading rooms for the benefit of these female employees. Together with similar buildings constructed for the welfare of employees such as the People's Club supported by mill owners in Lowell, Massachusetts, Seaside Institute stands as an example of 19th century philanthropy aimed at the welfare of employees or industrial paternalism. An 1887 account of the purposes of the Institute printed in The Century expresses the particular solicitousness toward women employees:

In these days, when the hearts of the compassionate are torn by so many harrowing tales of man's inhumanity towards working-women, it is pleasant to be able to set forth the good deeds of these two chivalrous employers. Under the law of competition which always pushes the weakest to the wall, women are the slaves of the labor market. They have not learned to combine; they have no power to resist the oppression of conscienceless capital; the price of their labor is therefore fixed by the most rapacious employers.... If the women who work are to be saved from their wretchedness, it must be done by the appearance on their behalf of such knightly employers as these....

The Seaside Institute was dedicated in an 1887 ceremony attended by Frances Folsom Cleveland, the wife of the President, and served its intended purposes for a number of years. By 1917, the Warners employed some 2200 women employees with the Institute providing meals, library and classes taught by organizations such as the Young Women's Christian Association. The institute was much remarked upon as an example of what could be done to fight the perceived negative influences of a variety of then-modern conditions, including, the labor problem: "Hushing the discontent of labor by paying fairly... its builders have erected here an island of peace in the storm, which demagogism linked with dishonesty and unthrift, is trying everywhere to precipitate." Likewise, the institute was seen as pointing towards a solution to the perceived ills of women working outside the home: "It ought to be possible for modern invention ... to carry this admirable enterprise further on, and to provide for the thousand girls [better lodgings]. For the development of the finer elements of character every young girl needs a room which there is some encouragement to keep tidy, and a chance to make pretty, if not beautiful." The institute was even seen as providing a model for ameliorating the perceived problem of saloon patronage by workers. During the labor shortage in World War I, Warner Brothers used the institute's amenities in an attempt to attract women workers who could make more money making cartridges than corsets, describing "club rooms" where employees could take classes in gymnastics, embroidery and English. The offerings of the Institute did not, however, dissuade women workers from organizing and seeking better pay and working conditions, such as in 1915 when the International Textile Workers of America staged a strike seeking the eight-hour day, one of many such strikes in Bridgeport that summer.

== Bridgeport International Academy ==
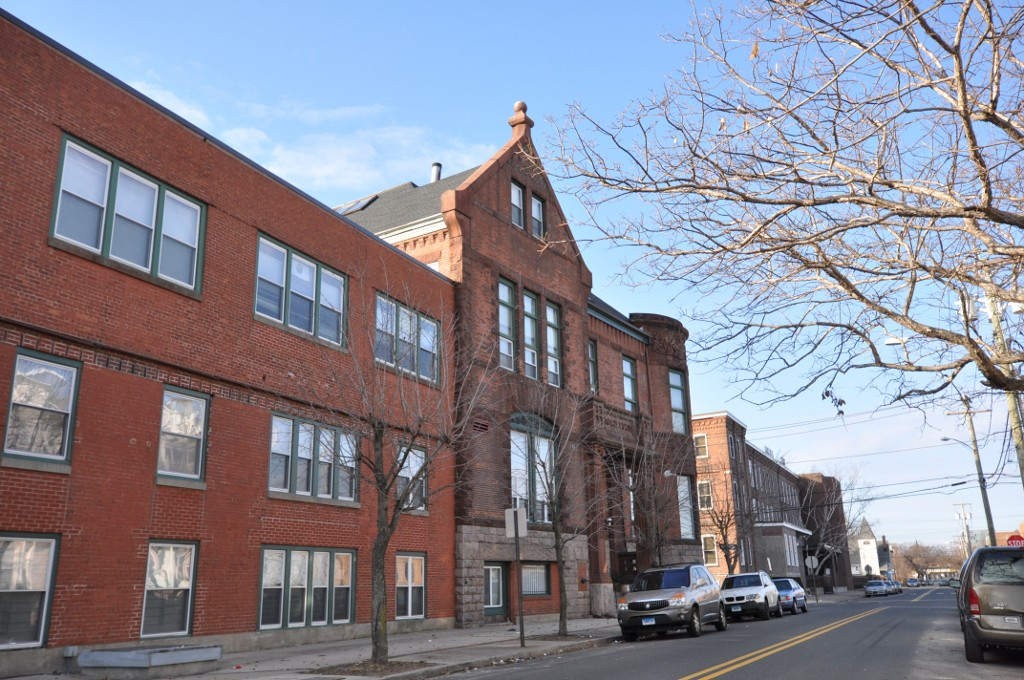
The institute building in 2013

In 1994, UBA Inc. bought the Seaside Institute building and later became home to Bridgeport International Academy . The building currently houses both the academy as well as Bridgeport Hope School, a K-8 private elementary school.

== See also ==
- History of Bridgeport, Connecticut
- National Register of Historic Places listings in Bridgeport, Connecticut
