= Fairfield County Courthouse (Danbury, Connecticut) =

Coordinates: 41.3905°N 73.4475°W

The Fairfield County Courthouse in Danbury, Connecticut is a historic building that was designed by architect Warren R. Briggs, who also designed the Fairfield County Courthouse in Bridgeport

It is a contributing building in the Main Street Historic District.

The courthouse is still in use.
