= Father Panik Village =

Former housing project in Bridgeport, US

Coordinates: 41°11′02″N 73°10′30″W

- Interactive map of Father Panik Village

Construction
- Constructed: 1939

Listing
- Demolished: 1993

Other information
- Governing body: Bridgeport Housing Authority

Father Panik Village was the first housing project located in Bridgeport, and the first in the state of Connecticut, United States. Groundbreaking took place in 1939, and the development initially opened as Yellow Mill Village.

== History ==
By 1936, Father Stephen Panik, a Slovak Catholic priest, had enlisted the support of Mayor Jasper McLevy and Governor Wilbur L. Cross to secure federal funding through the Federal Housing Authority. The Bridgeport branch of the NAACP, local church congregations, and private citizens joined Panik in advocating for the project, which aimed to improve living conditions for city residents. Panik successfully secured $6.5 million in federal funds, and the federal government approved 40 acres of land for construction.

The 1939 groundbreaking was attended by Congressman Albert E. Austin and Governor Wilbur L. Cross, both of whom gave speeches to mark the occasion. The development opened in 1940 with 778 apartments across 47 brick buildings on a 40-acre (16 ha) site on the east side of Bridgeport. At its opening, the population was approximately 5,400, which would have made it the 51st largest municipality in Connecticut at the time and was the sixth largest housing complex in the country.

The first apartments were completed during World War II. The complex, built across 40 acres, originally included parking areas for residents’ mule-drawn transportation to work and church. Father Panik died in 1953. In 1955, Yellow Mill Village was renamed Father Panik Village in his honor. The main access road was later named Martin Luther King Drive after the civil rights leader Martin Luther King Jr.

The development bordered Saints Cyril & Methodius Parish to the northwest, with Crescent Avenue providing bus service operated by the Greater Bridgeport Transit Authority. Buses arrived and departed every fifteen minutes, offering residents access to employment, schools, shopping, and healthcare. The Metro-North Railroad tracks ran along the northern boundary, while the Remington Arms ammunition plant, located directly south, employed many residents. The eastern edge of the complex was defined by the Yellow Mill River, while Pembroke Street marked the western boundary and Hamilton Street the southern.

Businesses in the surrounding area included Singer Manufacturing Company, Lace Manufacturing, Carpenter Steel, Stanley Works, Bridgeport-Lycoming, Bridgeport Brass, General Electric, Jenkin Brothers, Skydale Department Store, along with numerous restaurants and small businesses.

=== Life in the village ===
In 1940, monthly rent at Father Panik Village ranged from $17 to $26, about 20% of the average male wage for a family with two parents and three children. By 1987, rent had risen to $516, or approximately 30% of the income for a single parent with two children. Considered progressive for its time, the development included indoor bathrooms, hot and cold running water, gas stoves, a park, and a community center with a library containing more than 600 children’s books.

In 1963, a fight at a baptismal party in the complex resulted in the death of Pablo Gonzales, a father of four. His attacker, Lorenzo Cora, was charged with murder.

=== Decline and demolition ===
By the 1980s, Father Panik Village had deteriorated into a slum and became a center for crime and drug activity, averaging four to five of Connecticut’s approximately 150 annual gun homicides. In 1986, the city of Bridgeport razed all but 15 of the housing units, with final demolition completed in 1994. By 1987, the remaining population was about 2,500 residents across 816 families. At the time, Mayor Thomas W. Bucci described Father Panik Village as "one of the worst-managed housing complexes in the nation."

== Current site ==
After the demolition of Father Panik Village, the site was divided into three sections. The northeastern portion became Water View Park, the western portion (south of Saints Cyril & Methodius Parish) was redeveloped with single- and multi-family housing, and the southeastern corner was converted into Eastside Park, separated from Water View Park by Waltersville Elementary and Middle School.
