= Sterling Hill Historic District (Bridgeport, Connecticut) =

Historic district in Connecticut, United States

- U.S. National Register of Historic Places
- U.S. Historic district
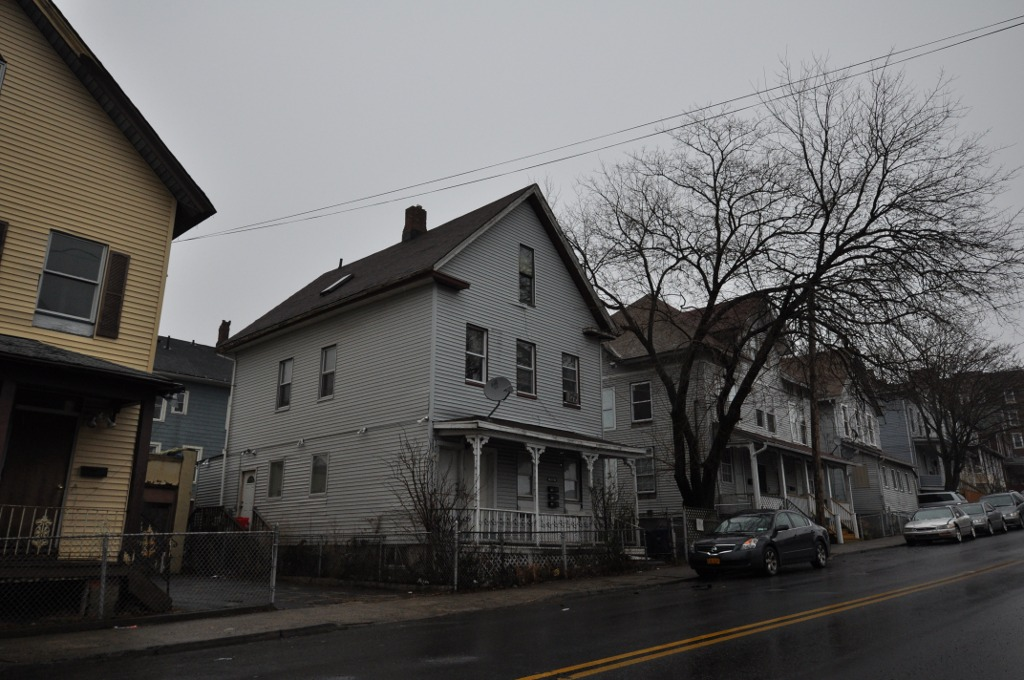
- Pequonnock Street

- Location within Connecticut Location within the United States
- Location: Roughly bounded by Pequonnock Street, Harral Avenue, James Street and Washington Avenue, Bridgeport, Connecticut
- Coordinates: 41°10′53″N 73°11′49″W
- Area: 8 acres (3.2 ha)
- Architect: Multiple
- Architectural style: Greek Revival, Gothic, Federal
- NRHP reference No.: 92000335
- Added to NRHP: April 2, 1992

The Sterling Hill Historic District in Bridgeport, Connecticut is a historic district that was listed on the National Register of Historic Places in 1992. The district is a two-block area of 43 urban residential structures dating as far back as 1821. Most of the buildings are from later in the 19th century when the neighborhood was largely occupied by Irish working-class residents. Most of the early buildings are vernacular wood-frame structures with modest Federal, Greek Revival, or Gothic Revival details, while the later additions include multiunit tenement-style buildings. The area includes the oldest urbanized part of the city.

== Description and history ==
Sterling Hill is located on the northwest side of Bridgeport's Golden Hill. It is named for Sylvanus Sterling, a saddle manufacturer in the early 19th century, whose house still stands on Milne Street, and who developed the area following Bridgeport's incorporation in 1821. Early development of the area provided homes for wealthy local businessmen, who liked the views from the hillside over the developing port and business center. In the 1830s, the construction of the first railroad through Bridgeport brought an influx of Irish laborers, with tenement-style housing accompanying the subdivision of the older residences into multiunit housing. Growth continued after the Civil War, when gentrification replaced many tenement-style buildings with more stylish late Victorian multiunit buildings. Urban renewal claimed a significant portion of the neighborhood in the 20th century, but the area roughly bounded Pequonnock Street, Harral Avenue, James Street, and Washington Avenue retains architectural traces of this development history.

== See also ==
- History of Bridgeport, Connecticut
- National Register of Historic Places listings in Bridgeport, Connecticut
