= Fairfield County Courthouse (Ohio) =

Local government building in the United States

The Fairfield County Courthouse
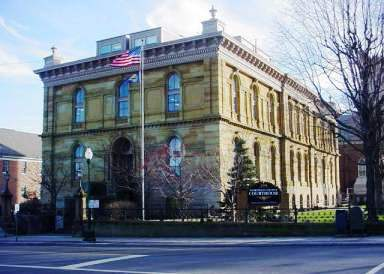
- Fairfield Courthouse shown here. The Hall of Justice is to its right.
- Interactive map of the The Fairfield County Courthouse area

General information
- Location: Lancaster, Ohio, United States
- Coordinates: 39°42′47.71″N 82°35′55.79″W
- Construction started: 1868
- Completed: 1872
- Cost: $138,921
- Client: Fairfield County Commissioners

Design and construction
- Architect: Jacob B. Orman

The Fairfield County Courthouse is located at 224 East Main Street in Lancaster, Ohio. The courthouse is the second for the county.

== History ==
Fairfield County was established by the Legislature of the Northwest Territory from parts of Ross and Washington counties, which would later be transformed into the surrounding counties of Knox, Licking, Perry and Hocking, with small parts becoming Muskingum, Morrow, Pickaway, Franklin, Holmes and Coshocton counties.

The courts held session in leased locations including a log schoolhouse in Lancaster, then known as New Lancaster. The county finally received approval to build a courthouse from the newly formed state of Ohio in 1803, and construction began in 1806. The courthouse was finished in 1807 and was a two-story rectangular brick building located in the center of Broad Street at the northern edge of Main Street.

Space was an issue for the county in 1858, and the county commissioners purchased land on the corner of Main and High Streets for that purpose. The commissioners ordered a vote to determine if a levy would pass for the construction of a new courthouse. The records of this vote were lost but the issue was not heard from for a while. The county issued a contract in 1861 to David Cowden to enlarge the 1807 courthouse. A new roof was placed, iron shutters were hung and several remodels to add offices were accomplished within the next two years, but it didn't take into consideration of the growing population for the next few years.

The commissioners in a stroke of intuition had the public lot leased, cleared and converted into a temporary field. The time came in 1866 when the courthouse was condemned and a proposition was made to the Ohio General Assembly for authorization of $100,000 to build a new courthouse. The next year the old courthouse was razed and the courts were held in the First German Reformed Church on West Church Street. The approval from the Assembly came in 1867 and construction on the public plot began soon thereafter. The construction was completed in 1872 and came in at a total of over $138,000.

The county once again experienced growing pains in 1970 and the county decided on a new building adjacent to the courthouse. The building, dedicated as the "Hall of Justice", was completed in 1975 and houses the courts. When the courts moved into this new hall, the county officials expanded into the new rooms, thereby alleviating much of the cramping.

== Exterior ==
=== Courthouse ===
The rectangular courthouse is constructed of locally quarried stone and rises two-stories on top of a full ground floor. The long arched windows line the facade, three on the front and nine on the sides and are separated by a pair of Doric pilasters. The main entrance is flanked by an inner Corinthian column and an outer Corinthian pilaster. The door is located inside a recessed portico and is topped by a fanlight. The flat roof is supported by an entablature with urns on the corners.

=== Hall of Justice ===
The Hall of Justice is a square two-story brick building located on top of a full ground floor. The entrance is accessed by a flight of stairs and a small stoop. The entrance is flanked by white Doric columns and white trim. A small false balcony tops the tiny porch. The door is flanked by two windows on each side with five windows on the top floor. The hipped roof is pierced by dormer windows and rests on a wide overhang.
