= Fairfield County Courthouse (Bridgeport, Connecticut) =

- U.S. National Register of Historic Places
- U.S. Historic district – Contributing property
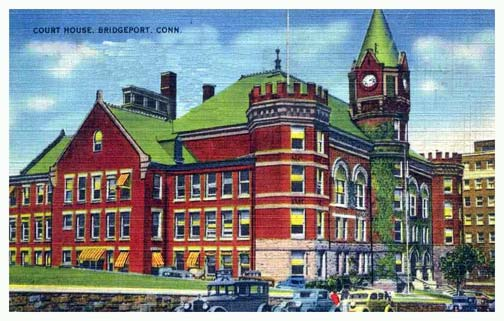

- Location within Connecticut Location within the United States
- Interactive map showing the location of Fairfield County Courthouse
- Location: 172 Golden Hill Street, Bridgeport, Connecticut
- Coordinates: 41°10′50″N 73°11′28″W
- Area: 2 acres (0.81 ha)
- Built: 1888
- Architect: Warren R. Briggs
- Architectural style: Richardsonian Romanesque
- Part of: Bridgeport Downtown North Historic District (ID87001403)
- NRHP reference No.: 82004376

Significant dates
- Added to NRHP: January 21, 1982
- Designated CP: November 2, 1987

The Fairfield County Courthouse, also known as the Court of Common Pleas, is located at 172 Golden Hill Street in Downtown Bridgeport, Connecticut. It is also known as Geographical Area (GA) Courthouse No. 2 at Bridgeport. It is a Richardsonian Romanesque brick building built in 1888. It was listed on the National Register of Historic Places in 1982. It still functions as a courthouse where all but the most serious criminal cases are heard.

== History ==
In 1886, when the then-current city hall/county courthouse (now McLevy Hall) proved insufficient for both the growing needs of Bridgeport and Fairfield County, the county decided to build a new courthouse. Norwalk bid for the new courthouse to be moved there, offering $100,000 towards construction, but the Bridgeport group, including P.T. Barnum, offered $150,000. The building was designed by Bridgeport architect Warren R. Briggs, and was completed and opened in 1888.

== Architecture ==
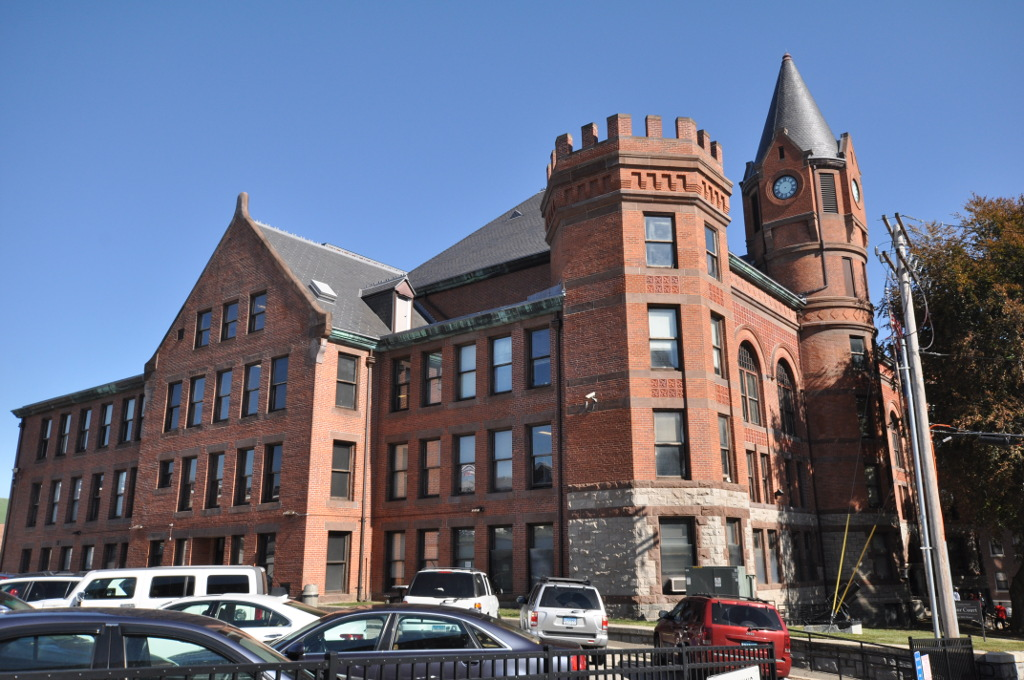

The Fairfield County Courthouse stands on the northside of downtown Bridgeport, on the north side of Golden Hill Street just west of Main Street. It is a three-story masonry structure, with its exterior clad in brick with brownstone and terra cotta trim. It is set on a high foundation of ashlar granite. The main facade is dominated by a six-story tower at its center, which is capped by a pyramidal roof. The building corners are adorned with crenellated turrets. The main entrance is to one side of the tower, in the center of a series of large round-arch bays, with flanking granite columns.

== See also ==
- History of Bridgeport, Connecticut
- National Register of Historic Places listings in Bridgeport, Connecticut
