= First Baptist Church (Bridgeport, Connecticut) =

Historic church in Connecticut, United States

- U.S. National Register of Historic Places
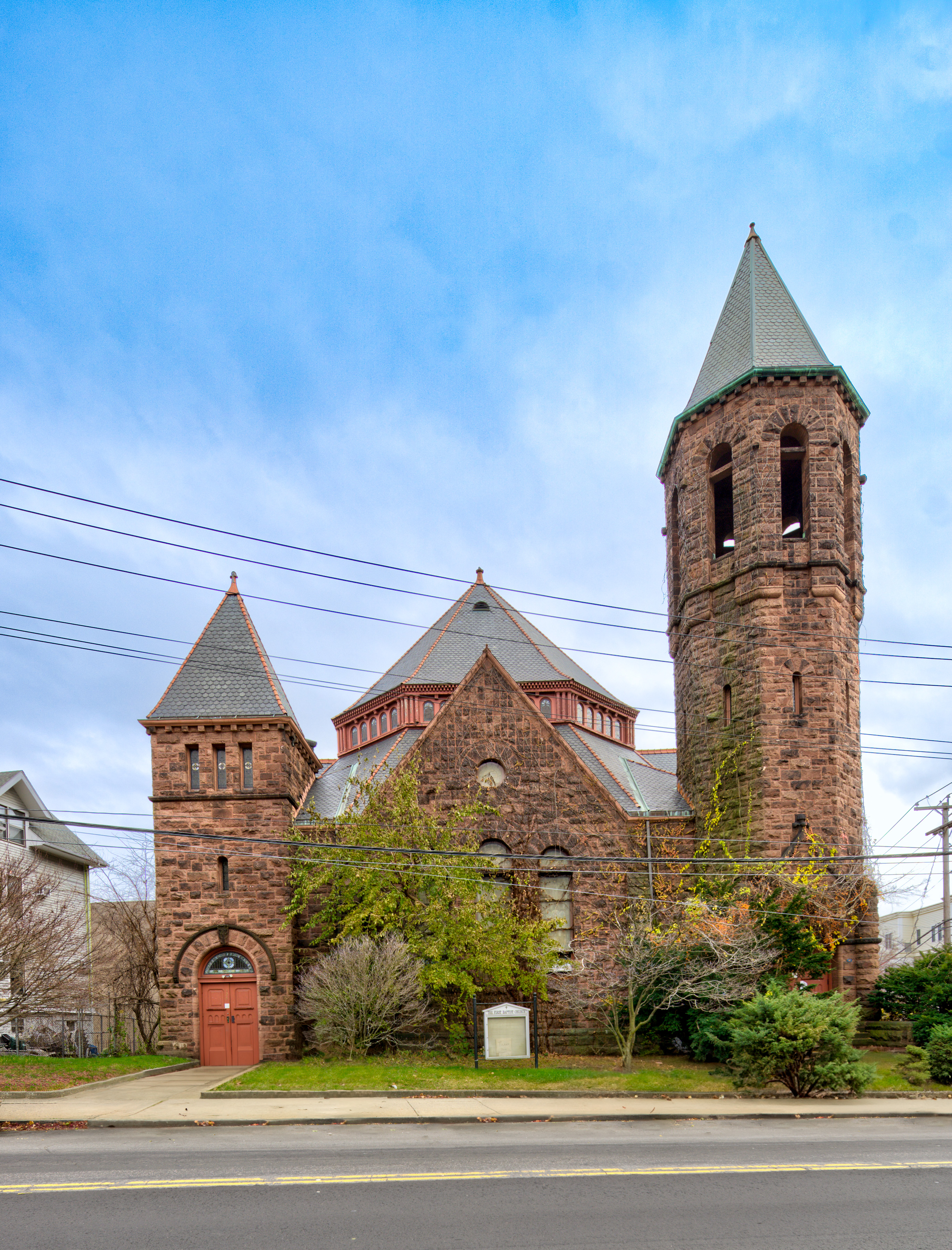

- Location within Connecticut Location within the United States
- Location: 126 Washington Avenue, Bridgeport, Connecticut
- Coordinates: 41°10′35″N 73°11′53″W
- Area: 0.4 acres (0.16 ha)
- Built: 1893
- Architect: Northrop, Joseph
- Architectural style: Richardsonian Romanesque
- NRHP reference No.: 90000154
- Added to NRHP: February 22, 1990

The First Baptist Church is a historic church at 126 Washington Avenue in Bridgeport, Connecticut. Built in 1893, it is a distinctive local example of Richardsonian Romanesque architecture, designed by local architect Joseph W. Northrop for a congregation founded in 1837. It was listed on the National Register of Historic Places in 1990.

== Architecture and history ==
Bridgeport's First Baptist Church stands west of the city downtown at the northeast corner of Washington Avenue and West Street. It is a tall single-story structure, roughly in the shape of an elongated octagon with several projections. It is built of red sandstone from East Haven. The most prominent is the 4-1/2 story octagonal tower at the street corner, which houses the main entrance in a square pavilion at its base. Shorter towers rise from the other corners of the building. The main roof is hipped and rises to support a clerestory window near its apex. The interior is relatively little altered since a 1930 renovation, and still retains many features from its original construction, including the tile floor, plastered walls, and oak pews. Attached to the rear is the parish house, built at the same time with similar materials and styling.

The congregation was established in 1837 and grew from 39 founders to become one of the city's largest Protestant congregations. This building, its third, was built in 1893 to a design by local architect Joseph W. Northrop. It is a prominent local example of Richardsonian Romanesque architecture.

== See also ==
- National Register of Historic Places listings in Bridgeport, Connecticut
