= Taylor Memorial Library =

- U.S. National Register of Historic Places
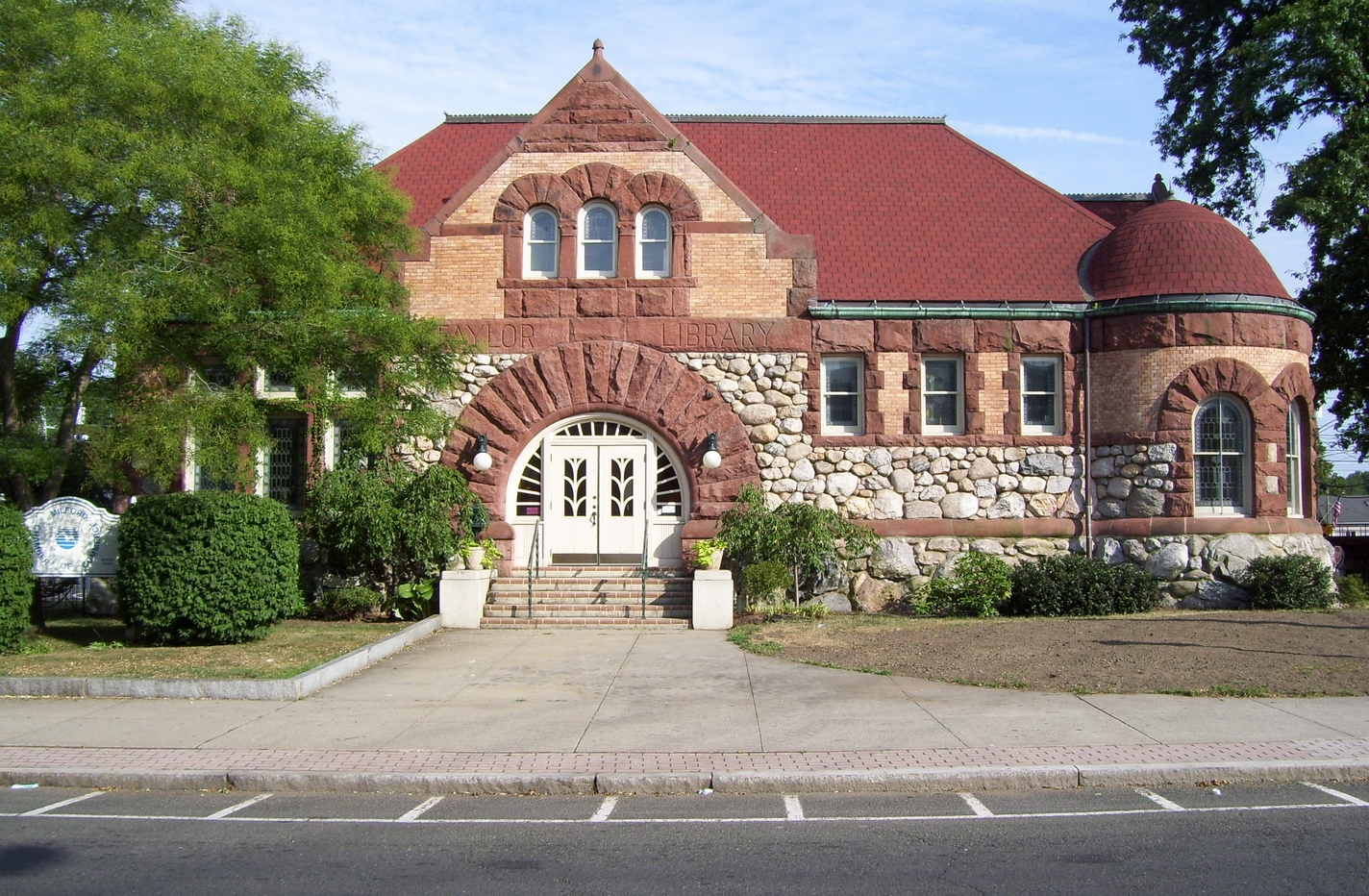
- The Taylor Memorial Library building, now used as the home of the Milford Chamber of Commerce, in 2010.

- Location within Connecticut Location within the United States
- Location: 5 Broad Street, Milford, Connecticut
- Coordinates: 41°13′20″N 73°3′27″W
- Area: 0.3 acres (0.12 ha)
- Built: 1894
- Architect: Joseph W. Northrop
- Architectural style: Romanesque, Richardsonian Romanesque
- NRHP reference No.: 79002642
- Added to NRHP: August 21, 1979

The Taylor Memorial Library, also known as Taylor Library or Old Library, is a historic former library building at 5 Broad Street in Milford, Connecticut. Built in 1894, it is a Richardsonian Romanesque building designed by Joseph W. Northrop. It follows, but departs from, H. H. Richardson's design of the Crane Memorial Library in Massachusetts. The building was listed on the National Register of Historic Places in 1979. It now houses the offices of the Milford Chamber of Commerce.

== Description and history ==
The former Taylor Library building stands at the eastern end of Milford's city center green, on the north side of Broad Street at River Street. It is a 1-1/2 story roughly rectangular masonry structure, built out of a combination of local fieldstone, red sandstone, and yellow brick. It was originally covered by a tile roof, but is now covered by tile-colored shingles. The main entrance is off-center on the south-facing main facade, set in a large half-round arch topped by three-part round-arch window and projecting roof gable. At the front right corner is a projecting rounded area, capped by a bell-shaped roof. The interior retains a number of period features, but others have been lost due to the building's conversion to non-library use.

The library was designed by Bridgeport architect Joseph W. Northrop, and was completed in 1894. Northrop was an eclectic architect conversant in all of the popular styles of the time, and he clearly based this design on the landmark Crane Memorial Library of H. H. Richardson. Construction of the building was funded by Henry Augustus Taylor, a railroad executive who moved to Milford in 1890. The library is one of several buildings Taylor sponsored in memory of his mother Mary. It was used as a library until 1976, when the new Milford Public Library building opened. The building has since been adapted to house the local chambers of commerce.

== See also ==
- National Register of Historic Places listings in New Haven County, Connecticut
