= McLevy Hall =

- Bridgeport City Hall
- U.S. National Register of Historic Places
- U.S. Historic district – Contributing property
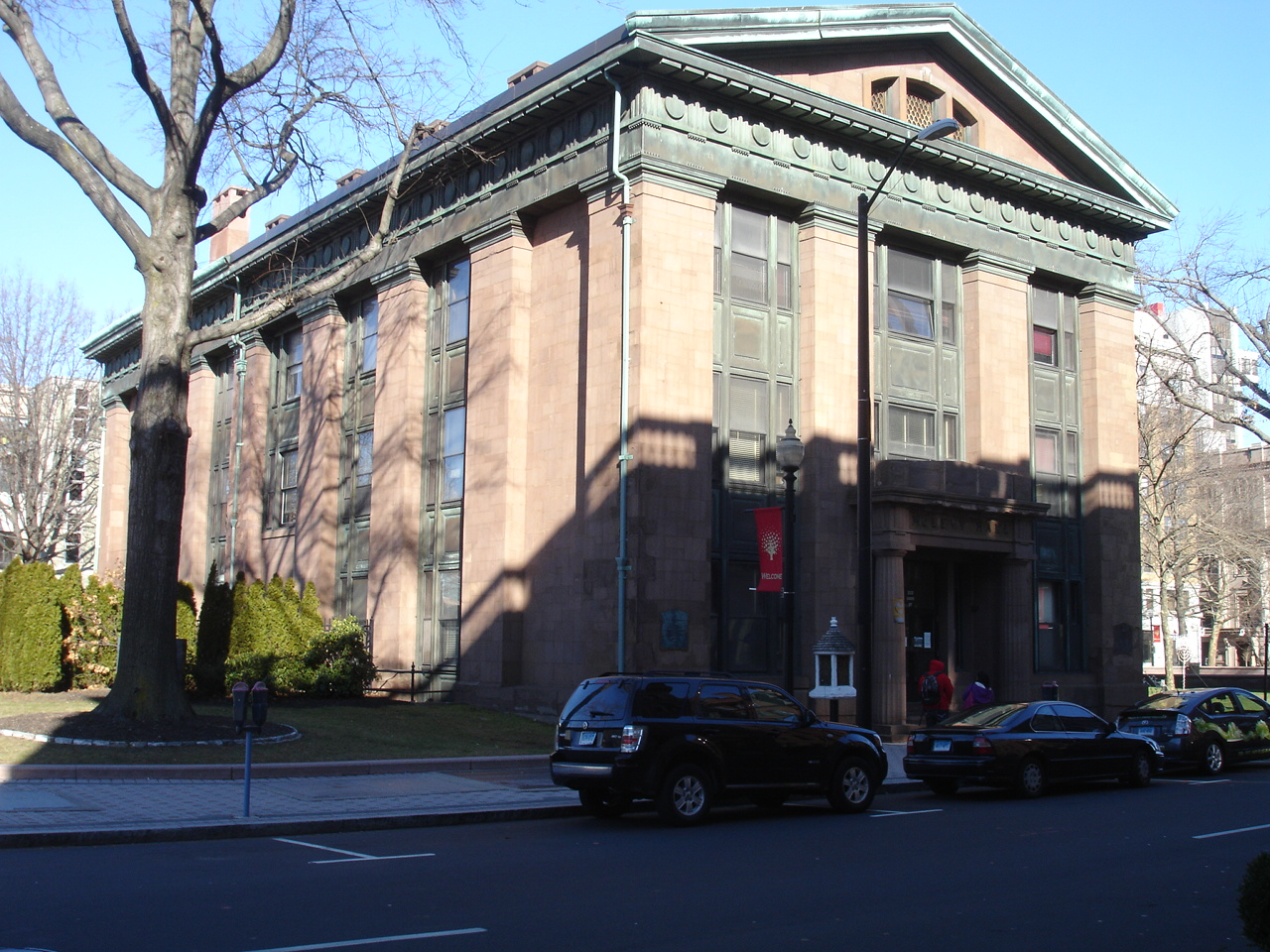
- McLevy Hall in Winter 2012

- Location within Connecticut Location within the United States
- Interactive map showing the location of McLevy Hall
- Location: 202 State Street, Bridgeport, Connecticut
- Coordinates: 41°10′36″N 73°11′27″W
- Area: 1.8 acres (0.73 ha)
- Built: 1854
- Architect: A. J. Davis; J. W. Northrop
- Architectural style: Classical Revival, Greek Revival
- Part of: Bridgeport Downtown South Historic District (ID87001402)
- NRHP reference No.: 77001387

Significant dates
- Added to NRHP: September 19, 1977
- Designated CP: September 3, 1987

McLevy Hall is a historic municipal building at 202 State Street in downtown Bridgeport, Connecticut. The building was built in 1854 to house both the City Hall and the Fairfield County Courthouse, and served as Bridgeport City Hall into the 1930s. It was renamed McLevy Hall after Bridgeport mayor Jasper McLevy in 1966. The current city hall on Lyon Terrace was built in 1916, however municipal offices continued to occupy McLevy Hall through the 1970s. It was added to the National Register of Historic Places on September 19, 1977.

== City Hall and Courthouse ==
Locating the Fairfield County Courthouse in Bridgeport was the result of much debate. Fairfield, Connecticut had been the site of the first county seat and courthouse in Fairfield County but by the mid-19th century, not only was the old courthouse insufficient for the county's needs, but the growth of Bridgeport and Norwalk made them more logical choices for county seat and a new courthouse. Bridgeport's offer to pay for the building of a courthouse and jail decided the matter. Bridgeport City Hall was constructed in 1853-54 between State and Bank Streets and cost $75,000. Alexander Jackson Davis designed it in the Greek Revival style to resemble a temple. The building, opened in 1855, had a large ground floor for use as City Hall, two floors for county government and court use and an auditorium, Washington Hall, for public gatherings. In 1886, when Bridgeport City Hall proved insufficient for both the growing needs of city and county, the Fairfield County Courthouse was built nearby.

== Lincoln speech ==
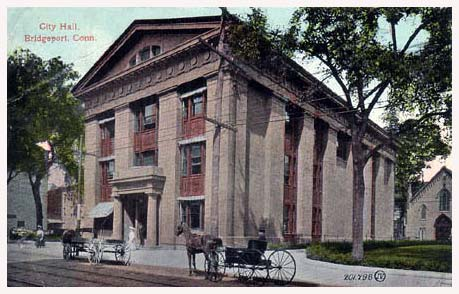
Western view of Bridgeport City Hall, before 1905

On Saturday, March 10, 1860, Abraham Lincoln spoke in Washington Hall at Bridgeport City Hall. Not only was the largest room in the city packed, but a crowd formed outside as well. Lincoln received a standing ovation before taking the 9:07 p.m. train that night back to Manhattan. A plaque marks the site where Lincoln spoke.

== See also ==
- History of Bridgeport, Connecticut
- National Register of Historic Places listings in Bridgeport, Connecticut
