= Connecticut's Beardsley Zoo =

Zoo in Bridgeport, Connecticut, United States

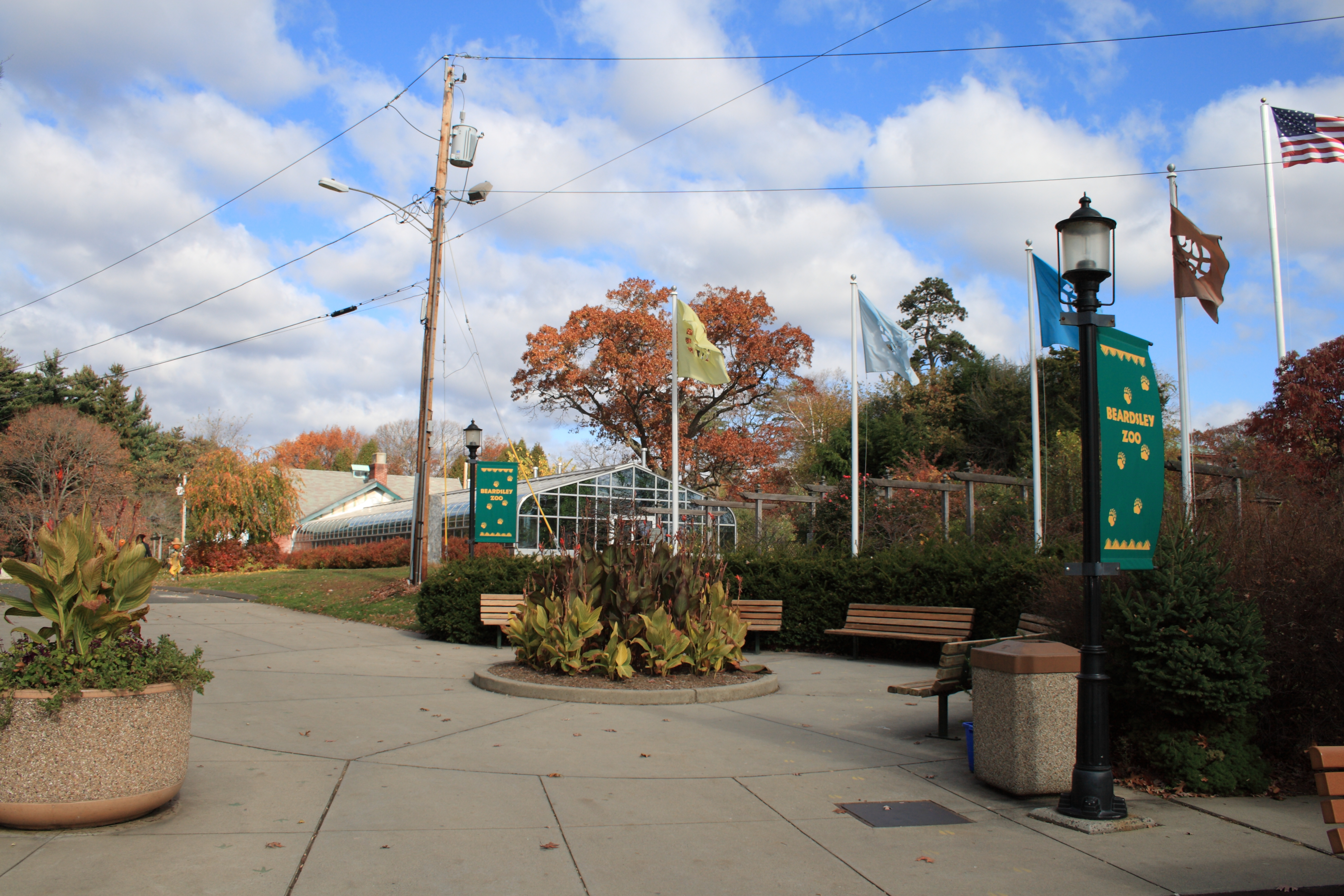
- Interactive map of Connecticut's Beardsley Zoo
- 41.2103°N 73.1815°W
- Date opened: March 16, 1922
- Location: Bridgeport, Connecticut, United States
- No. of animals: 500
- No. of species: 100+
- Annual visitors: 280,000
- Memberships: AZA
- Website: www.beardsleyzoo.org

Connecticut's Beardsley Zoo, located in Bridgeport, Connecticut, is the only Association of Zoos and Aquariums (AZA)–accredited zoo in the state of Connecticut. The zoo includes one of the few carousels in the state. The zoo has around 500 animals, from over 100 species, and welcomes about 280,000 visitors a year.

== History ==
- Beardsley Park
- U.S. National Register of Historic Places
- U.S. Historic district
- Location within Connecticut Location within the United States
- Location: 1875 Noble Avenue Bridgeport, Connecticut
- Coordinates: 41°12′45″N 73°10′56″W
- Area: 181 acres (73 ha)
- Architect: Olmsted, Fredrick Law; Northrup, Joseph W.
- Architectural style: Queen Anne, Modern Movement
- NRHP reference No.: 98000357
- Added to NRHP: March 18, 1999

=== The Park ===
In 1878, James W. Beardsley, a wealthy farmer, donated over 100 acres (40 ha) of hilly, rural land bordering on the Pequonnock River, with a distant view of Long Island Sound, to the city of Bridgeport on the condition that "the city shall accept and keep the same forever as a public park". In 1881, the city contracted Frederick Law Olmsted, famous for creating New York City's Central Park, to create a design for Beardsley Park. Olmsted described the existing land as "pastoral, sylvan and idyllic" and, in 1884, delivered his plan for a simple, rural park for the residents to enjoy:

[The land donated by Beardsley] is thoroughly rural and just such a countryside as a family of good taste and healthy nature would resort to, if seeking a few hours' complete relief from scenes associated with the wear and tear of ordinary town life... It is a better picnic ground than any possessed by the city of New York, after spending twenty million on parks... The object of any public outlay upon it should be to develop and bring out these distinctive local advantages, and make them available to extensive use in the future by large numbers of people.

Olmsted was the principal architect of the site. Architect Joseph W. Northrup designed Island Bridge, a bridge to an island in the park. In 1909, the city erected a statue created by Charles Henry Niehaus in honor of Beardsley at the park's Noble Avenue entrance. Beardsley Park was listed on the National Register of Historic Places in 1999.

=== The Zoo ===
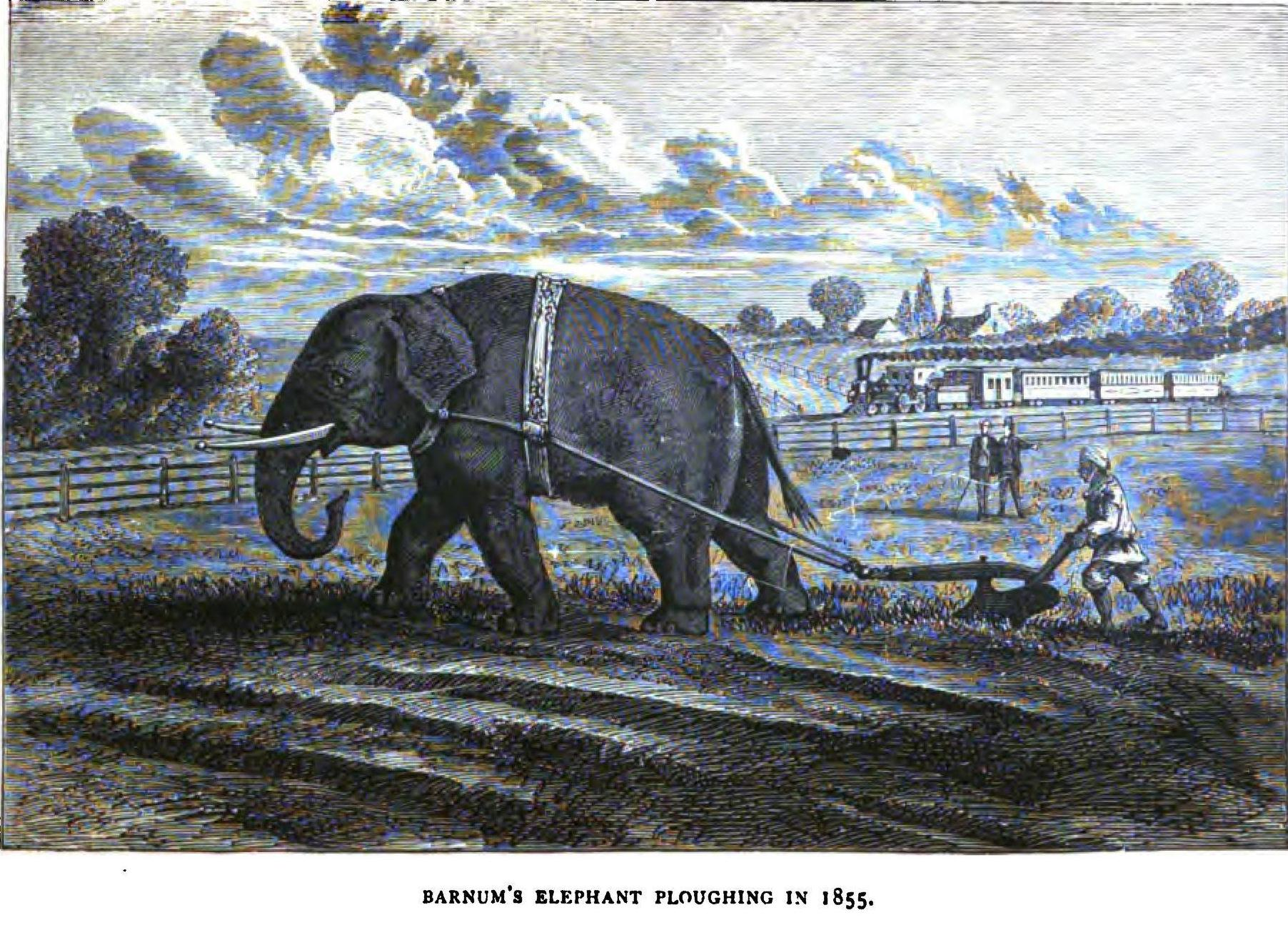
Barnum's elephant plowing in Bridgeport, with onlookers, 1855

At the time of the park's creation, the city of Bridgeport was home to Phineas T. Barnum and his world-famous circus. Barnum would exercise his animals through the streets of Bridgeport, and people gathered in Beardsley Park to see zebras and camels walking by.

In 1920, Bridgeport Parks Commissioner, Wesley Hayes, began a campaign to create a city zoo within the park. He requested that the citizens of Bridgeport contribute animals to start the zoo. Within the first year, eighteen exotic birds were donated. By 1927, the zoo had acquired a variety of exotic animals, including a camel donated by the Barnum and Bailey Circus.

In 1997, the Connecticut Zoological Society, a nonprofit support group for the zoo, purchased the zoo from the city. The society continues to run the zoo as a private, nonprofit institution with assistance from the state of Connecticut and the city of Bridgeport.

In 2007, the zoo became the first in the Northeast to exhibit Chacoan peccaries. In October 2011, it also became the first zoo in the Northeast to breed the species.

On July 25, 2009, the zoo, in partnership with the Connecticut Department of Energy and Environmental Protection (DEEP), held an Exotic Animal Amnesty Day, where people could turn in their exotic pets to the state without fear of prosecution. During the event 135 animals were surrendered, 14 of which were illegal. On March 31, 2012, the zoo and DEEP held another amnesty day, this time only aiming to accept animals which were illegal to own in Connecticut or that were in very bad condition. Seven animals were surrendered, five of them illegal.

In January 2010, the oldest Andean condor in the world, Thaao, died at the zoo after being a resident for 17 years.

On January 22, 2011, an endangered Brazilian ocelot kitten was born at the zoo through oviductal artificial insemination marking the first time that this kind of artificial insemination had successfully worked in an exotic wildcat. The achievement was made with the help of the Cincinnati Zoo's C.R.E.W.

In 2012, Connecticut's Beardsley Zoo celebrated its 90th anniversary. The zoo celebrated its birthday with guest promotions and a temporary summer exhibition of giant tortoises.

In September 2014, the zoo received top honors in the 2014 AZA Education Award for their outstanding education program.

In February 2024, Connecticut’s Beardsley Zoo Arboretum in Bridgeport was awarded a Level 1 Accreditation by The ArbNet Arboretum Accreditation Program and The Morton Arboretum, for achieving particular standards of professional practices deemed important for arboreta and botanic gardens.

In June 2025, the zoo reopened the Rainforest Building and added Evita, a 14-year-old ocelot and two new 10-year-old male Scarlet Ibises, who join the zoo’s existing male ibis to form a bachelor trio.

== Exhibits and animals ==
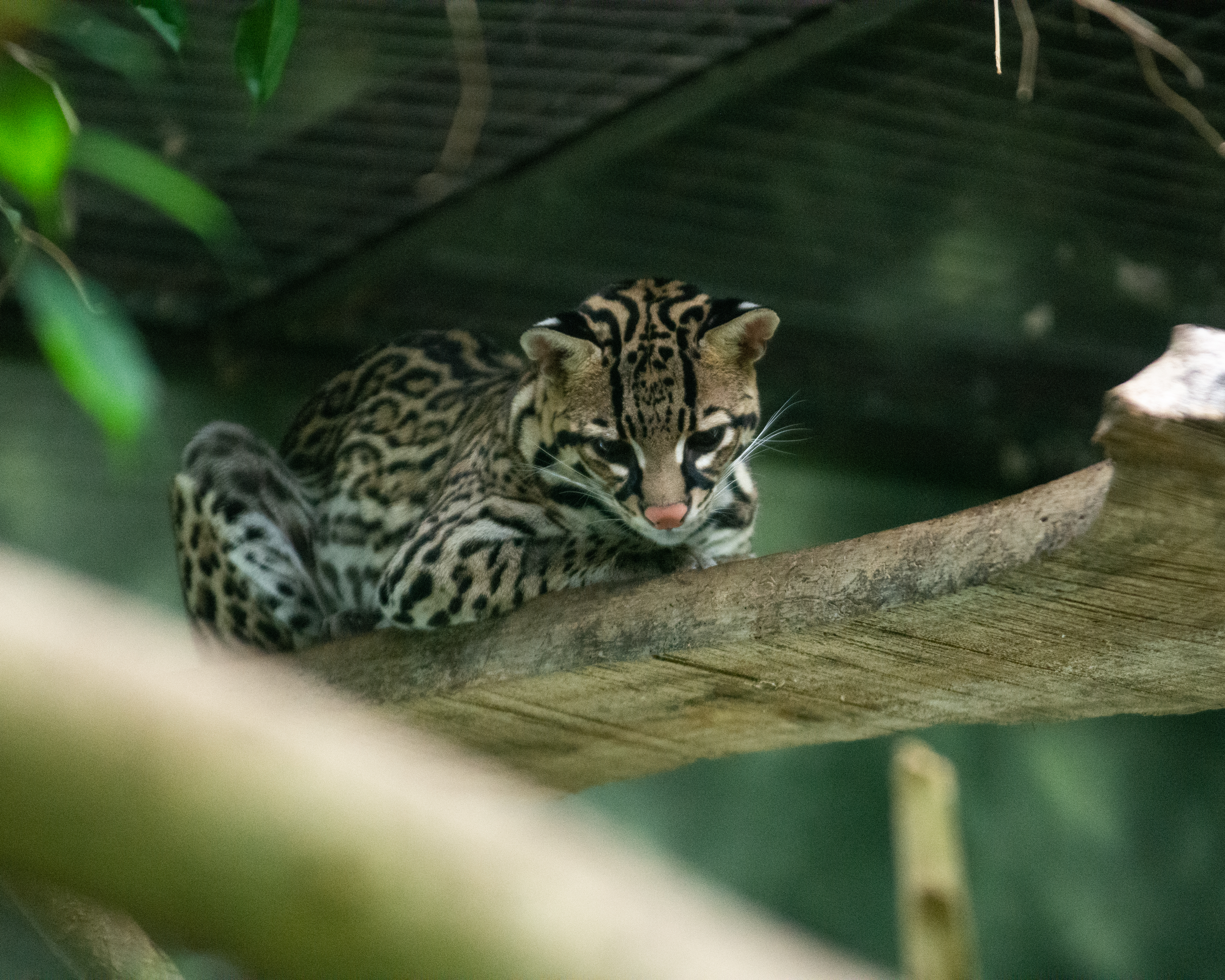
Brazilian ocelot at the Rainforest Building

Connecticut's Beardsley Zoo is divided into nine major exhibits:

1. Rainforest Building: An indoor building featuring several animals from tropical South America, including Brazilian ocelot (Leopardus pardalis mitis), black howler, white-faced saki, golden lion tamarin, Goeldi's monkey, Hoffman's two-toed sloth, Brazilian agouti, common vampire bat, scarlet ibis, Yacare caiman, red-tailed boa, Hispaniolan slider, Amazon milk frog and more. In 2015, the zoo installed a green roof to the building. The roof includes a mix of Sedum plants as well as grasses and chives. The roof is designed to absorb 60–70% of the rainwater that would otherwise drain into the sewage system, as well as naturally insulate the building, absorb heat from the sun instead of reflecting it off, and naturally filter water so it can be reused by the zoo.
2. Predators: A small row of enclosures featuring Amur tigers, and Amur leopards which first arrived in 2013. The zoo plans to build a larger tiger enclosure with glass-window viewing. Former residents include Canada lynx and a rare andean bear named Joaquim.
3. Alligator Alley: A small trail featuring various animals from the Southeastern United States, including grey fox, North American river otter, bald eagle, sandhill crane, and American alligator. The exhibit also features a small walk-through aviary home to various small birds and turtles. The two foxes were rescue animals born in South Carolina, the cranes rescued in Wisconsin, and the eagles were rescued from Alaska and Florida respectively.

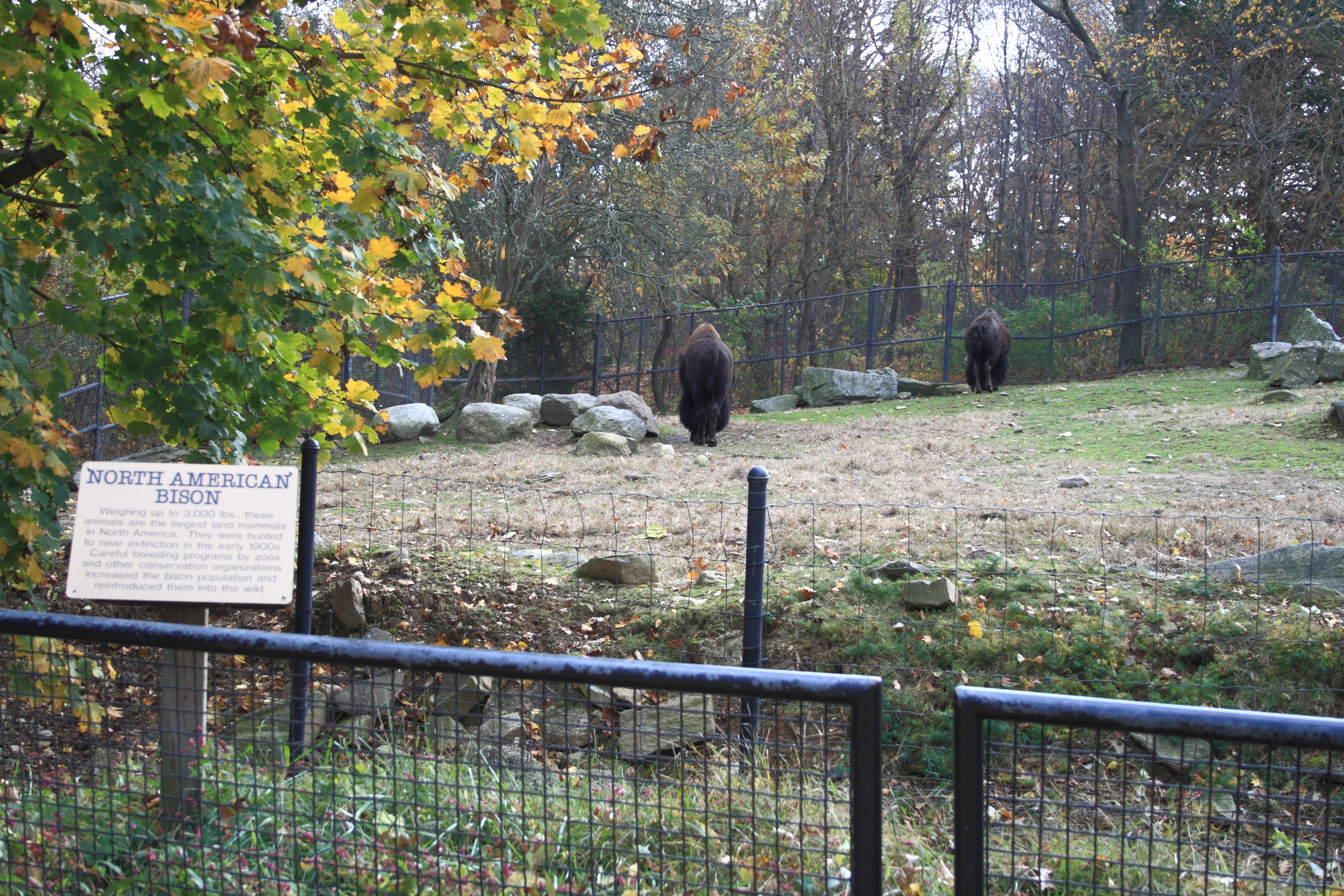
Bison at Hoofstock Trail

1. Hoofstock Trail: A long trail which loops around the zoo from Pampas Plains to Predators. The exhibit features animals native to the Great Plains such as plains bison, pronghorn, white-tailed deer, black-tailed prairie dog, turkey vulture, and barred owl. One of the female deer was orphaned on Beardsley Park grounds in 2005, and was initially exhibited in Alligator Alley. The zoo had a Pronghorn fawn born one June 8, 2012.
2. New England Farmyard: Designed as a small rural farm, the exhibit features a collection of farm animals, mainly of breeds which originated in New England, as well as some wild species that might be found in rural Connecticut. Domestic animals include Dexter cattle, llama, threatened Guinea hog, Cotswold sheep, various goat breeds, a feral cat, domestic rabbit, and various chicken, goose, and duck breeds. Wild animals include North American porcupine, great horned owl, snowy owl, American barn owl, common raven, tundra swan, cackling goose, and diamondback terrapin. The zoo has bred several rare breeds on many occasions, including Guinea hogs almost yearly since 2009.
3. W.O.L.F: A small exhibit near the zoo's entrance which features a Mexican wolf pair and a red wolf pair. The zoo was home to two timber wolves. They were replaced by the Mexican wolves. The exhibit is designed to look like a trapper's cabin and discusses the work the zoo does with these highly endangered species. The zoo has bred red wolves many times, with the latest birth being of four pups in June 2014, and some of the animals born at the zoo have been reintroduced to the wild. The zoo received three female Mexican wolves in 2013, and hope to one day breed the species for reintroduction back into the wild. "W.O.L.F" stands for Wolf Observation Learning Facility.
4. Native Reptile House: A small wooden building near the entrance of the New England Farmyard, the exhibit features various species of reptiles and amphibians native to Connecticut. Species include black rat snake, eastern milk snake, eastern garter snake, common snapping turtle, North American wood turtle, spotted turtle, three-toed box turtle, eastern box turtle, American bullfrog, eastern grey treefrog, and pickerel frog.
5. Professor Beardsley's Research Station: While not always open to the public, the exhibit is used mainly as an education center and is home to several of the zoo's education animals, such as European legless lizard, and bullsnake. The building is also where the zoo raises brook trout to be released into the wild. In June 2015, the zoo added three eastern hellbenders to the exhibit.
6. Pampas Plains: This new exhibit opened in 2015 and is phase one of the zoo's "South American Adventure". It features a raised walkway to allow for better viewing and is home to maned wolves, giant anteaters, Chacoan peccaries, and greater rheas. An anteater was born at the zoo on February 13, 2016, the first in the zoo's history. On July 30, 2018, another anteater was born. Anteaters and peccaries are seen only when the temperature is in the 50s or warmer.
7. Natt Family Red Panda Habitat: In October 2015, the zoo became home to a young male western red panda from the Franklin Park Zoo. He was temporary exhibited in the outdoor monkey enclosure outside the Rainforest Building. In October 2018 the zoo officially opened The Natt Family Red Panda Habitat to the public. The new habitat gives the zoo's two red pandas space to roam and play and gives visitors two new viewing areas.

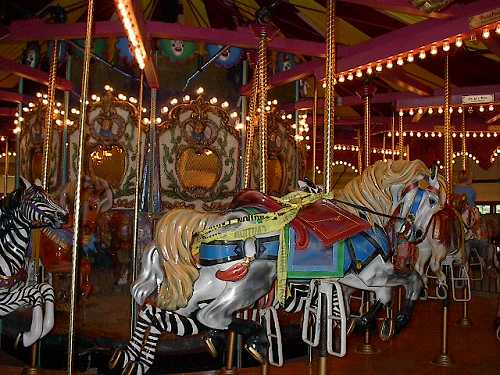
The zoo's carousel

In addition to these exhibit, the zoo is also home to an Andean condor, which can be found by the entrance of the zoo, as well as free-roaming West African helmeted guineafowl and occasionally wild turkeys.

The zoo also has a carousel and one of the largest greenhouses in Connecticut. The Victorian Greenhouse is also home to two agave plants that have grown flower stalks, and are expected to bloom soon as of January 2020. The plants are known as "century plants" because they bloom so rarely, roughly once every 30 years. At the entrance, a pair of brick buildings that once served as trolley barns for the city of Bridgeport now hold administrative offices.

=== Future plans ===
In continuation of the zoo's "South American Adventure", the zoo will receive $2.5 million in state funding to build "Spirit of the Cloud Forest", featuring a new pair of Andean bears and possibly a new enclosure for their condors. The new exhibit will see the return of the bear species to the zoo since their last male left in 2011.

=== Temporary exhibits ===
In August 2011, the zoo hosted the animal rescue organization "Rainforest Reptiles" in a temporary display of several rescued exotic reptiles, including an albino alligator.

In 2012, the zoo temporarily exhibited a Galápagos giant tortoise and Aldabra giant tortoise, from the Cameron Park Zoo, outside of the greenhouse for the 90th anniversary.

In 2014, the zoo held temporary camel rides from a pair of dromedary camels.

In 2015, the zoo brought back the camel rides due to popular demand. The pair from 2014 returned with a third animal. The zoo also exhibited several African spurred tortoises in the same temporary yard the giant tortoises had been in.

On April 26, 2016, the zoo added four African penguins in a temporary exhibit by the zoo's Peacock Café. They were on exhibit until September 30, 2016.

On November 25, 2017, two Amur tigers cubs (two sisters) were born at the zoo. The zoo began a webcam live-streaming of the tiger cubs via a webcam located in their nursery.

== Conservation ==
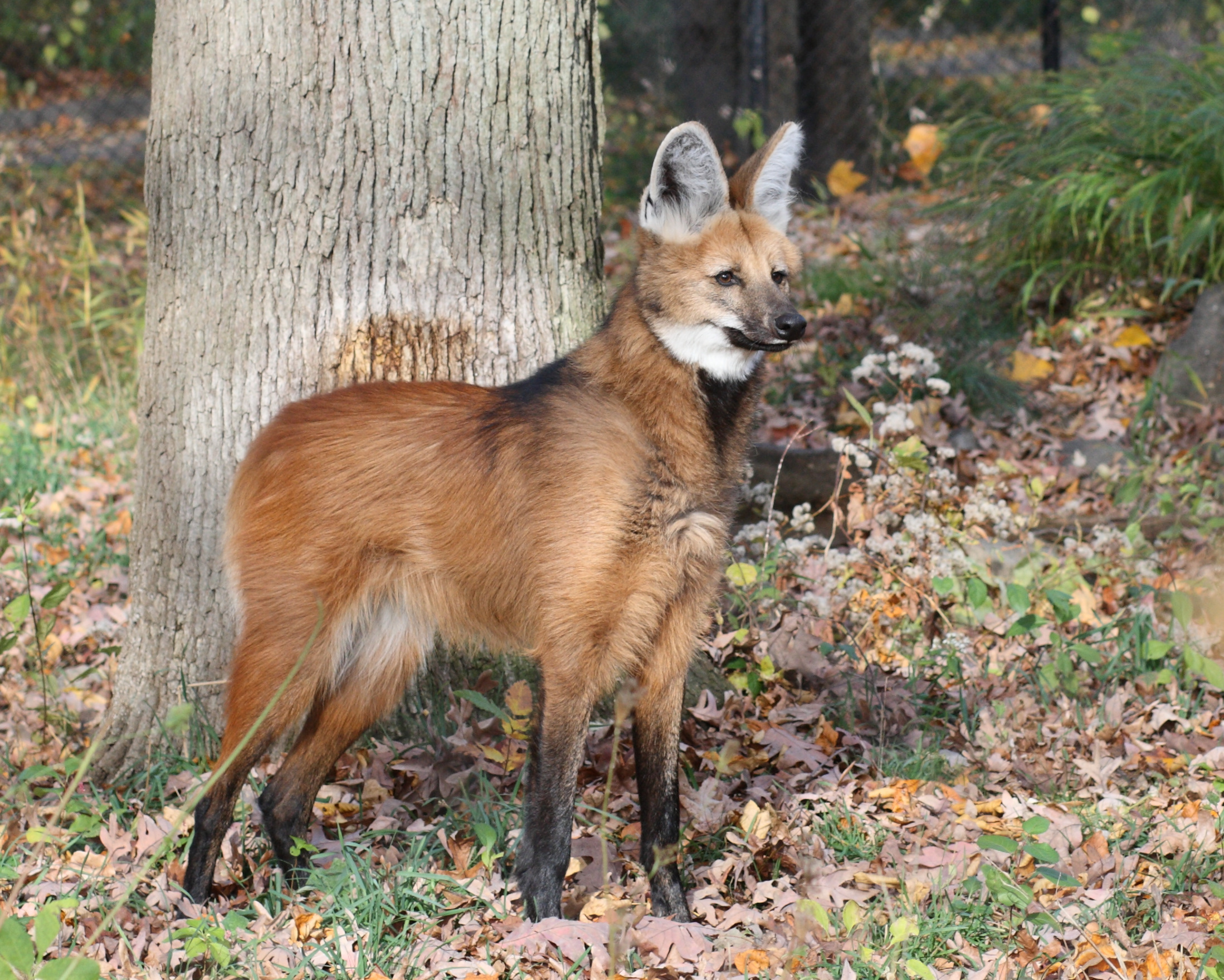
The maned wolf is one of the many animals focused on for conservation at the zoo.

The zoo takes part in several in-situ and ex-situ conservation programs. Being an accredited member of the Association of Zoos and Aquariums (AZA), the zoo partakes in multiple captive breeding programs and Species Survival Plans. The zoo works to care for and breed multiple endangered species such as Amur tigers, Amur leopards, Canada lynx, Brazilian ocelots, red wolves, Mexican wolves, maned wolves, giant anteaters, Chacoan peccaries, golden lion tamarins, North American river otters, Andean condors, spotted turtles, and eastern hellbenders.

The Connecticut's Beardsley Zoo Conservation Fund, established in 2002, awards up to $15,000 in funds to worldwide conservation programs. To date, the fund has supported the following programs:

- Alaska brown bear research
- AZA Bear Taxon Advisory Group
- AZA Small Carnivore Taxon Advisory Group
- Belize Zoo
- Carnivore Status Survey in Paraguay
- Connecticut animal track identification training
- Connecticut wetlands restoration project
- International Otter Colloquium
- Lion Tamarins of Brazil
- Zoo Conservation Outreach program

The zoo has also sent animals in their collection to be reintroduced into the wild to help boost wild populations. Species the zoo has contributed to the reintroduction of include red wolves, golden lion tamarins, Andean condors, and brook trout. The zoo hopes to soon breed and reintroduce Mexican wolves as well.

The zoo also takes in animals orphaned or injured in the wild that cannot be released:

- In June 2005, a two-week-old female white-tailed deer was found orphaned on Beardsley Park grounds. She was taken in by the zoo and exhibited in Alligator Alley before being moved in with bison and other deer in the Hoofstock Trail.
- In early 2010, a trio of male bald eagles arrived at the zoo. Two arrived from the Alaska Raptor Center and one from the Florida Audubon Society. All three had wing injuries which have made them unable to fly and thus were not able to be released back into the wild.
- In September 2010, a pair of sandhill cranes arrived from the Bay Beach Wildlife Sanctuary in Green Bay, Wisconsin. The pair had been raised separately by humans before being orphaned and eventually donated to the sanctuary. While the pair got along fine, they did not fit in with the other cranes at the sanctuary and the decision was made to move them elsewhere. Since the pair were raised by people, it was doubtful they would fare well in the wild and were taken in by the zoo instead.
- In May 2012, the zoo took in a three-week-old male bobcat which had been separated from its mother shortly after birth. Rescued in Connecticut, the zoo took in the animal after being contacted by the Connecticut Department of Energy and Environmental Protection due to there not being a licensed bobcat rehabilitation center in the state. The animal has been named "Beeze" (pronounced "B-Z") and is used as an animal ambassador by the zoo's education department.
- In August 2012, a pair of grey foxes arrived from Alligator Adventure in North Myrtle Beach, South Carolina. They were rescued as pups from the wild about four or five years prior to arriving at the zoo.
- The zoo's female barred owl was given to the zoo by a wildlife rehabilitator after being rescued in Southbury, Connecticut. She has damaged left wing and a cataract in her left eye, making her unable to survive in the wild.

=== Education programs ===
The zoo's core education program, the Conservation Discovery Corps (CDC), is a science and conservation-based program for high school students ages 14–18. Participants are trained in both zoo and field research, and are given an inside perspective on the operations of the zoo and gain experience in conservation education, public service, and public speaking. The students also work side by side with licensed field biologists, study the role of zoos in conservation, and help educate zoo visitors.

In September 2014, the CDC received top honors in the 2014 AZA Education Award for its outstanding ability to promote conservation knowledge, educate youth, and obtain success in its projects.

== Gallery ==
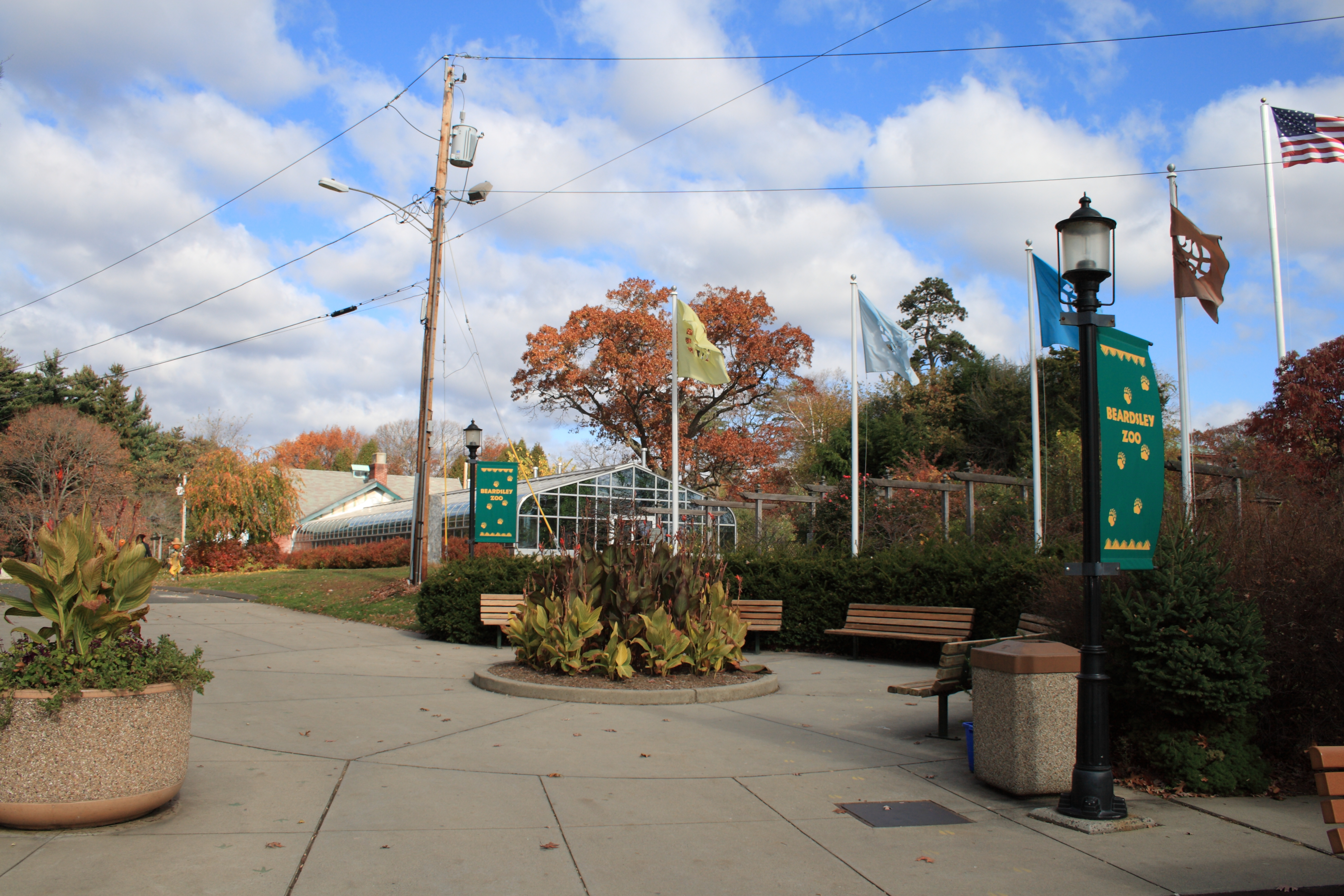
Entrance to the zoo

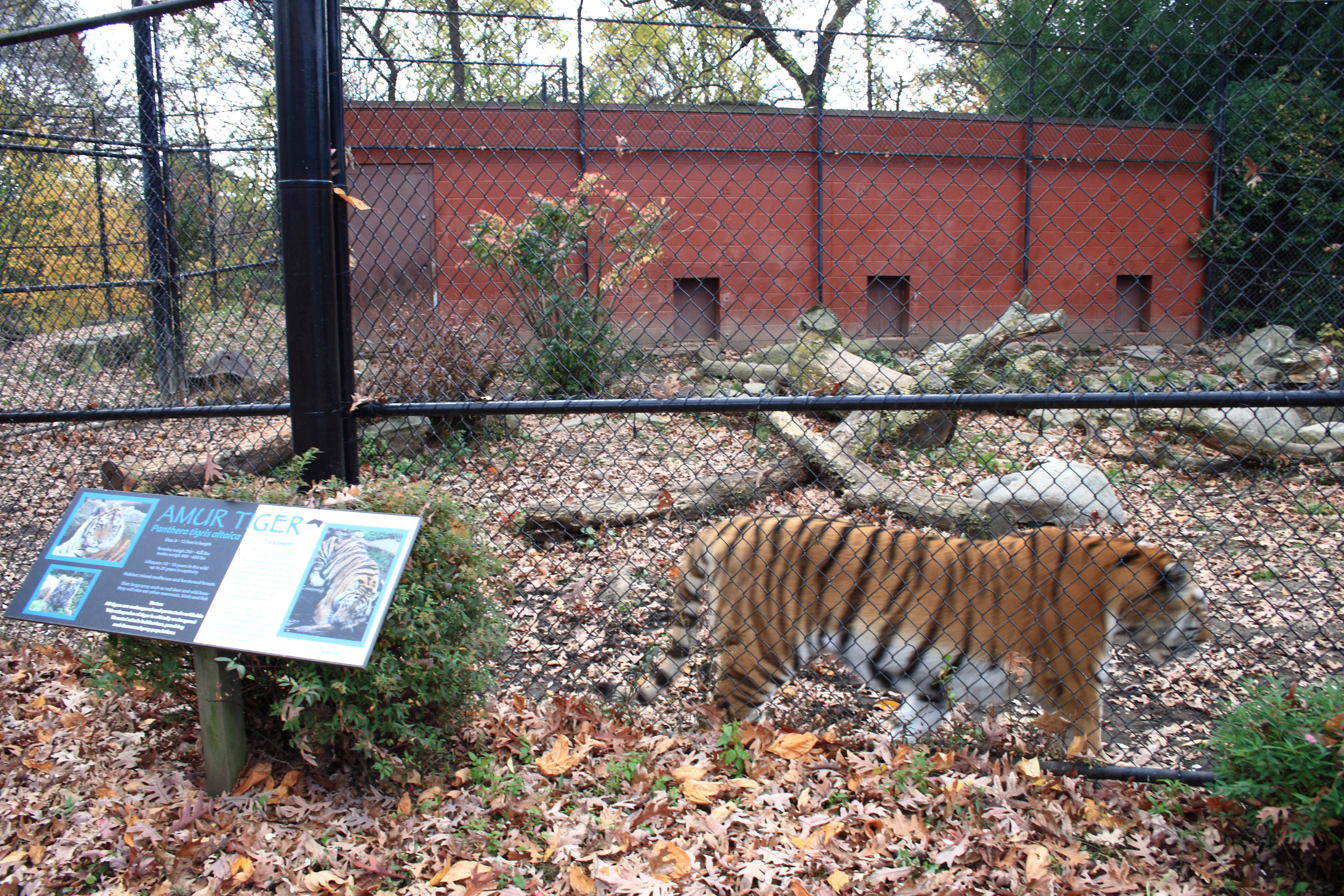
Siberian tiger

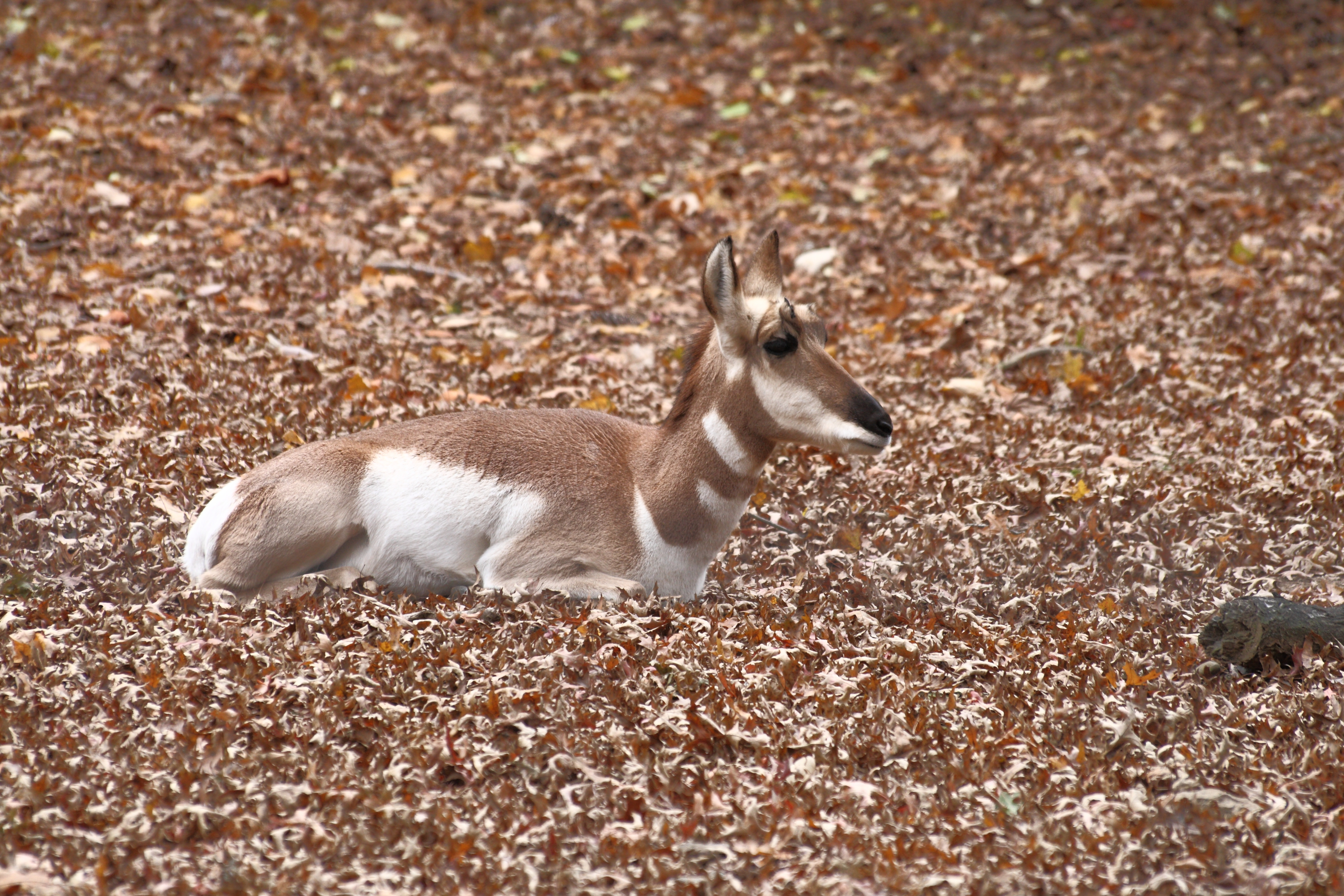
Pronghorn (Antilocapra americana)

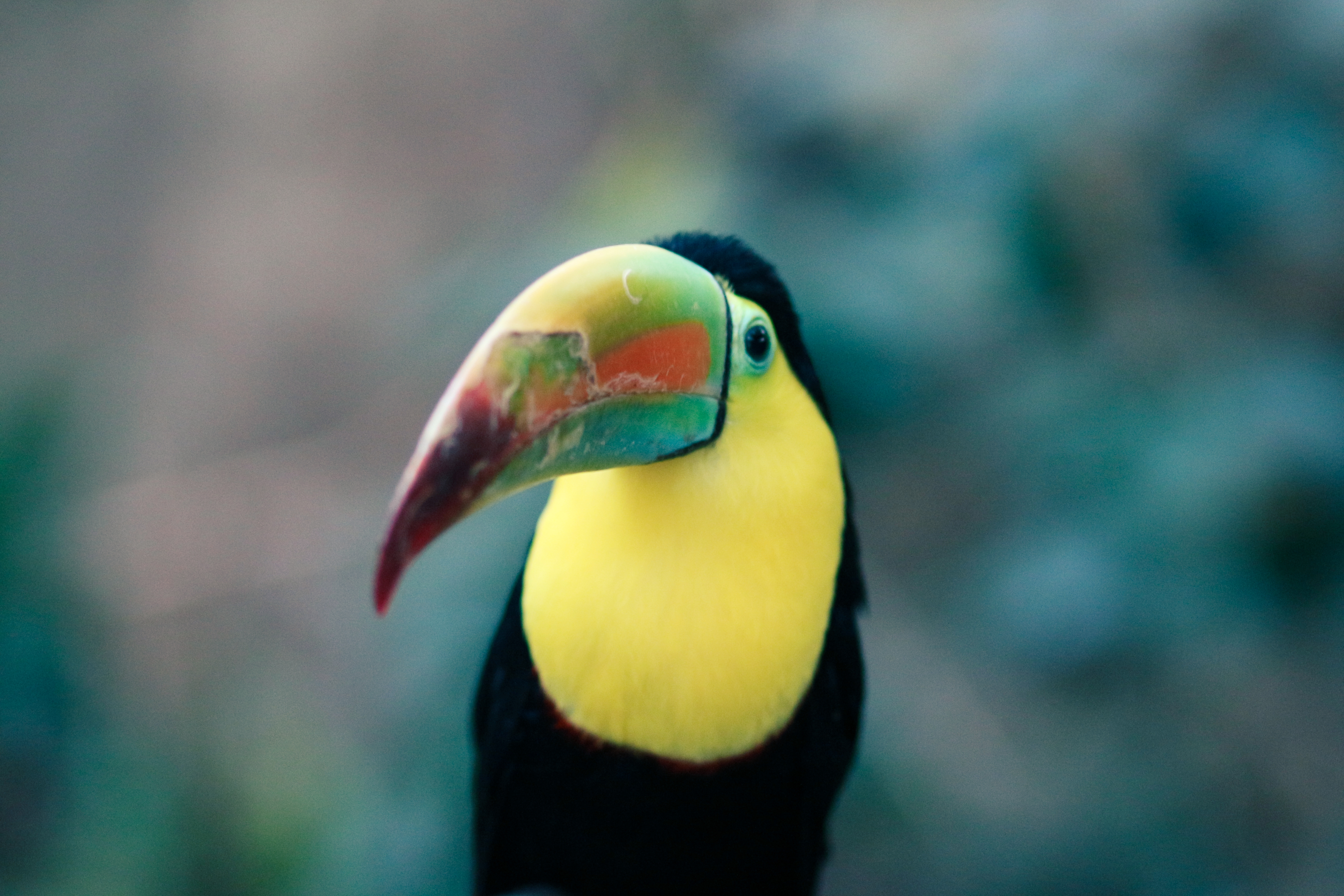
Toucan

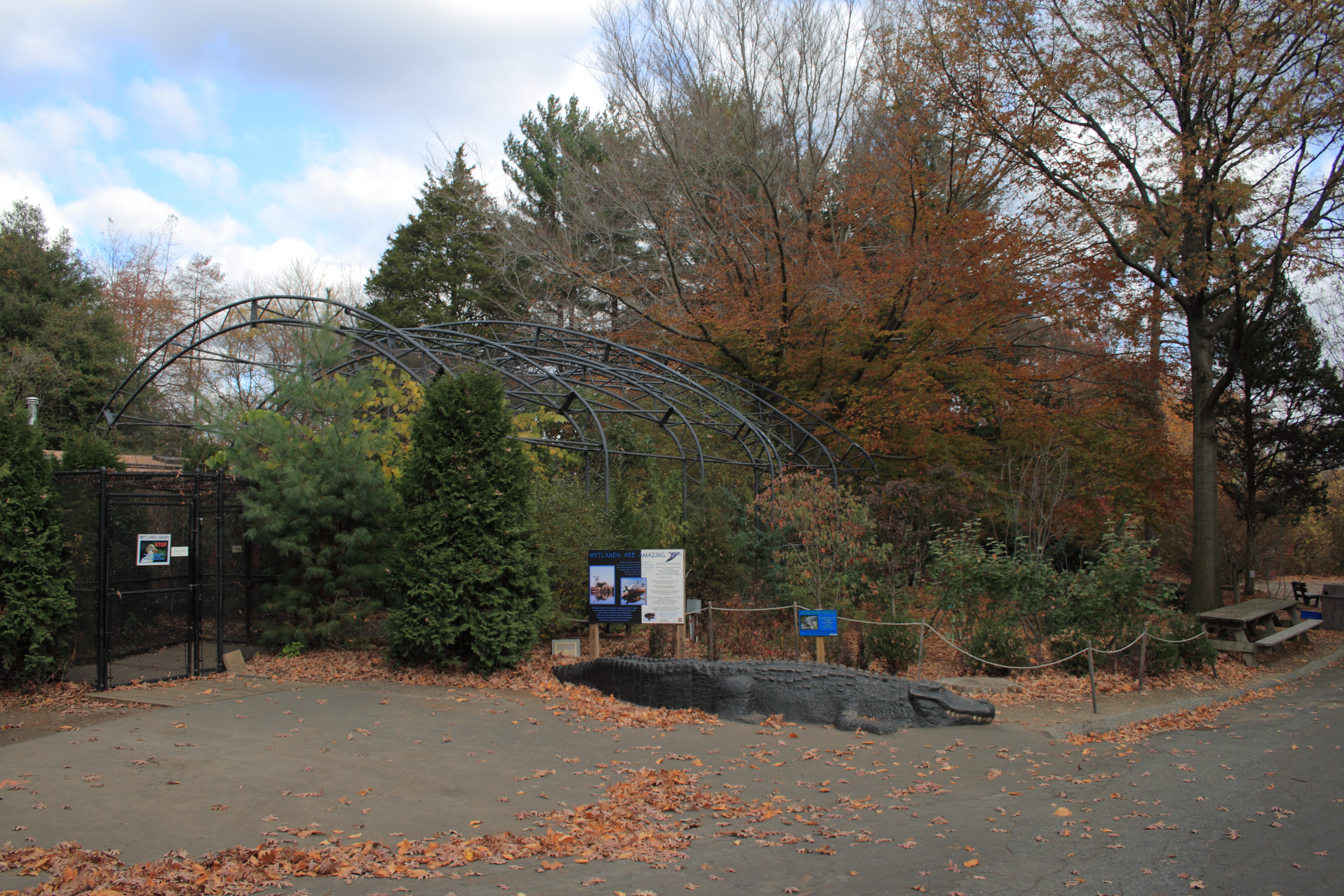
Wetlands Aviary

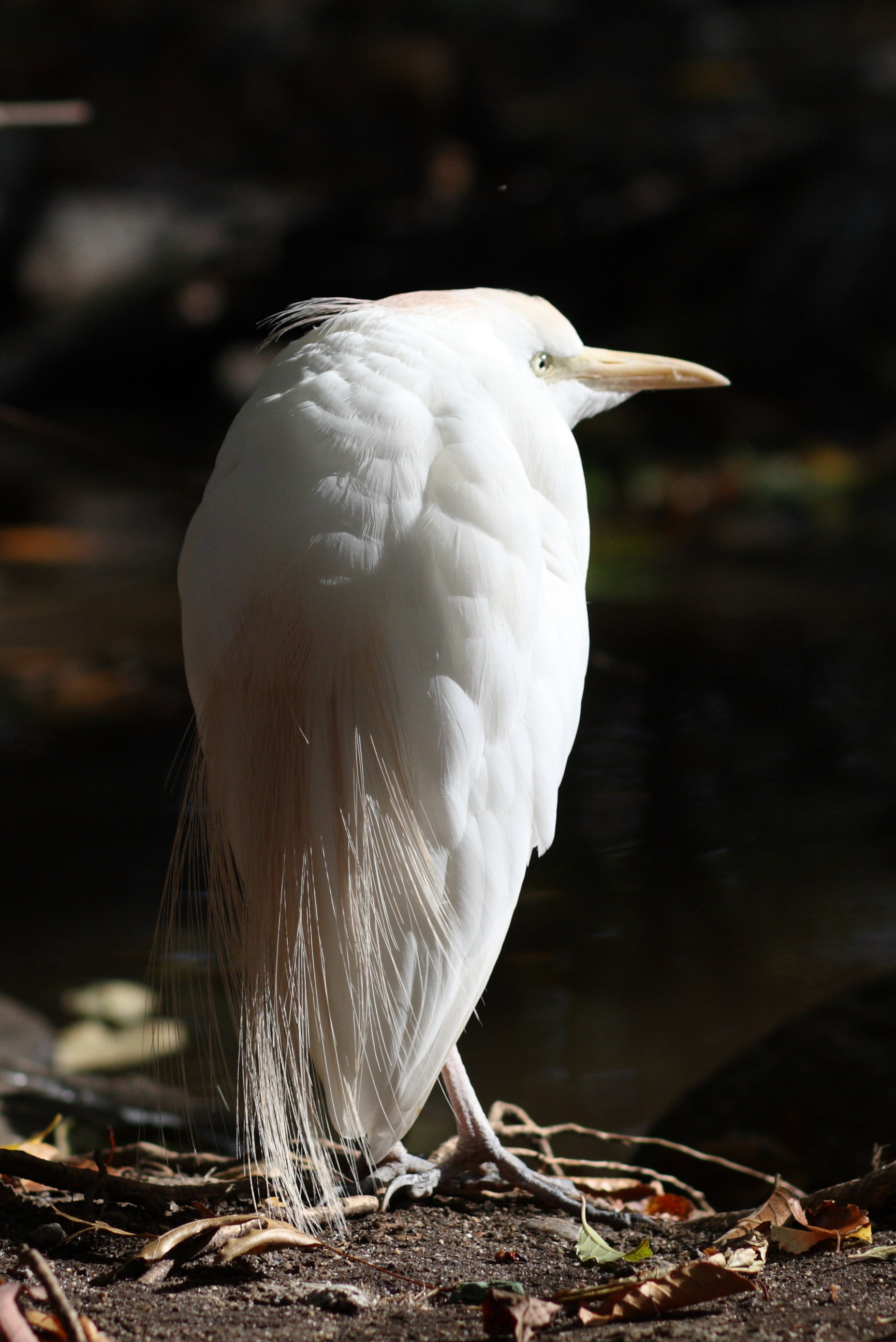
Cattle egret (Bubulcus ibis)

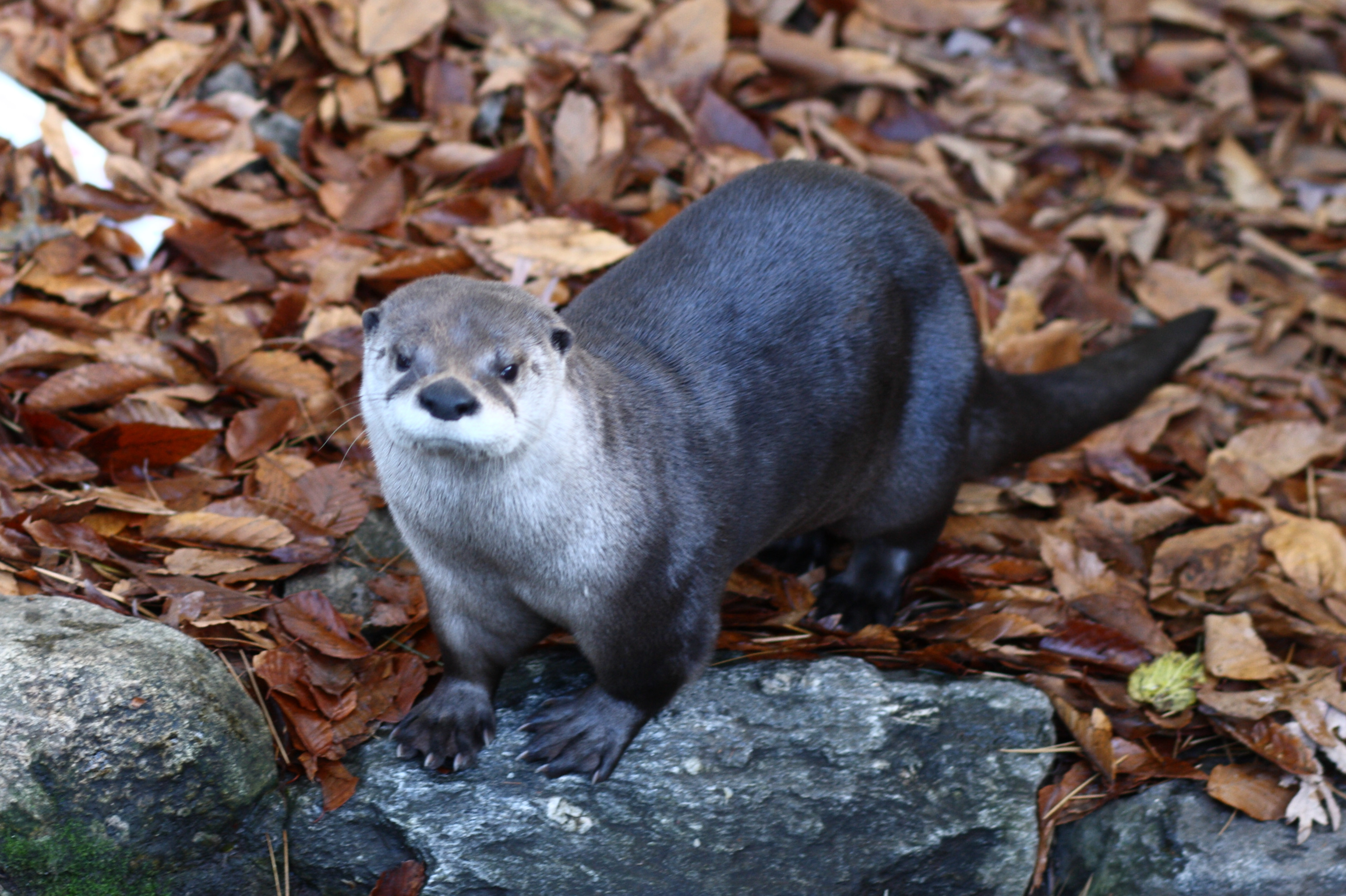
North American river otter (Lontra canadensis)

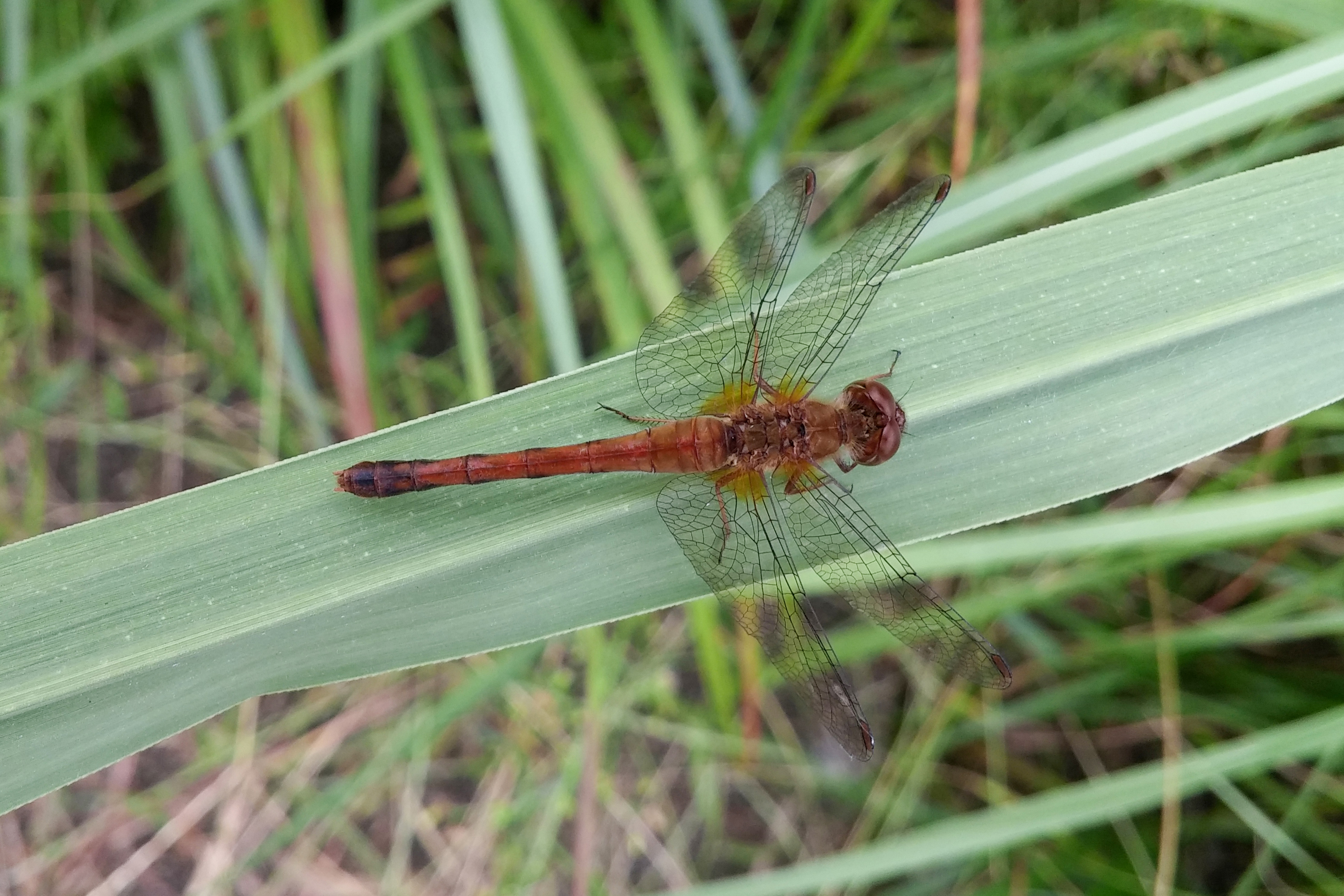
Autumn meadowhawk (Sympetrum vicinum)

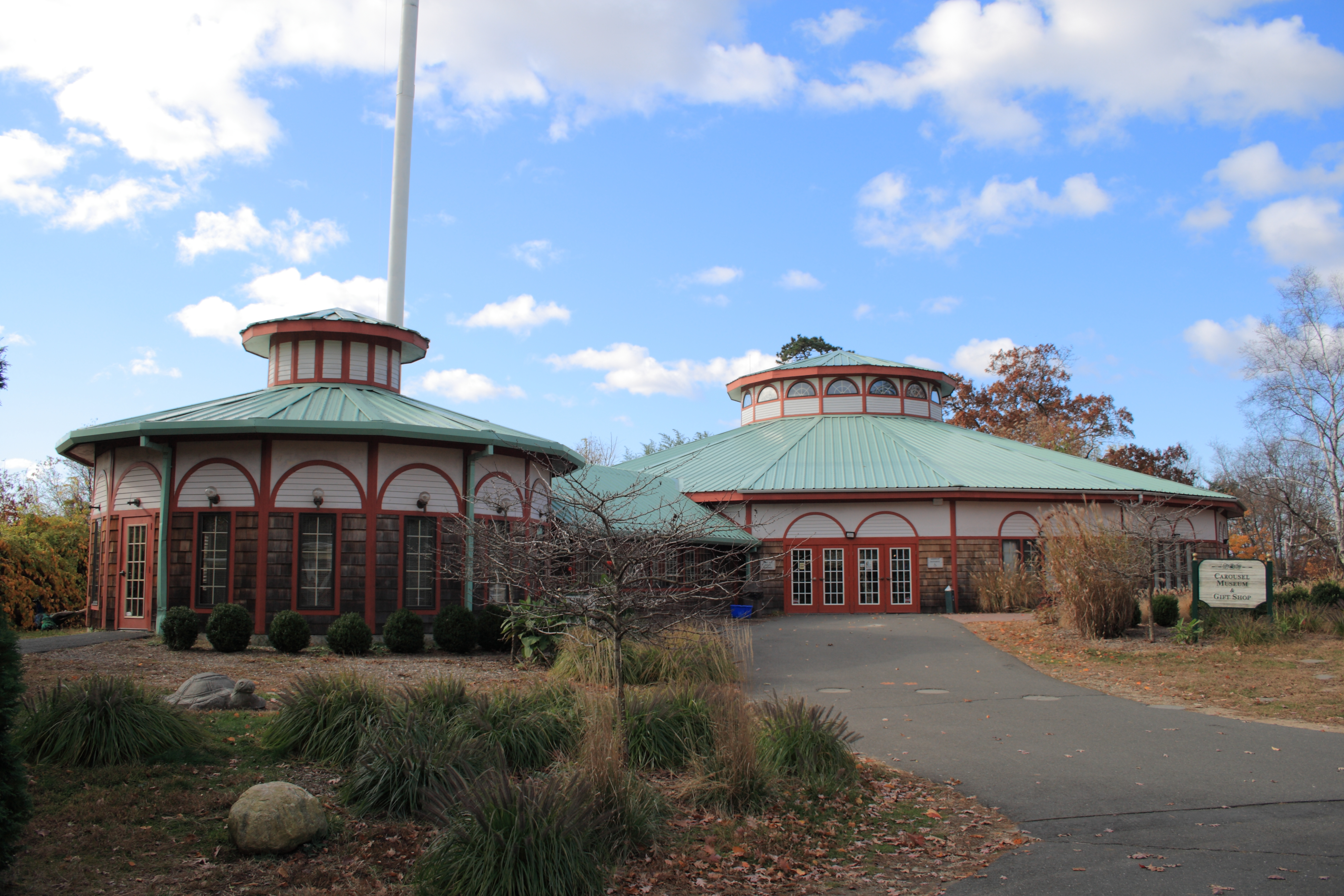
Carousel Museum and Gift Shop

== See also ==
- History of Bridgeport, Connecticut
- National Register of Historic Places listings in Bridgeport, Connecticut
