= Joseph W. Northrop =

American architect (1860-1940)

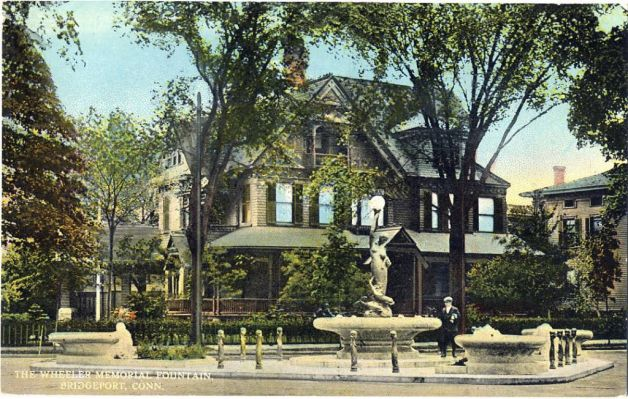
I. W. Birdseye House, Bridgeport, 1886.

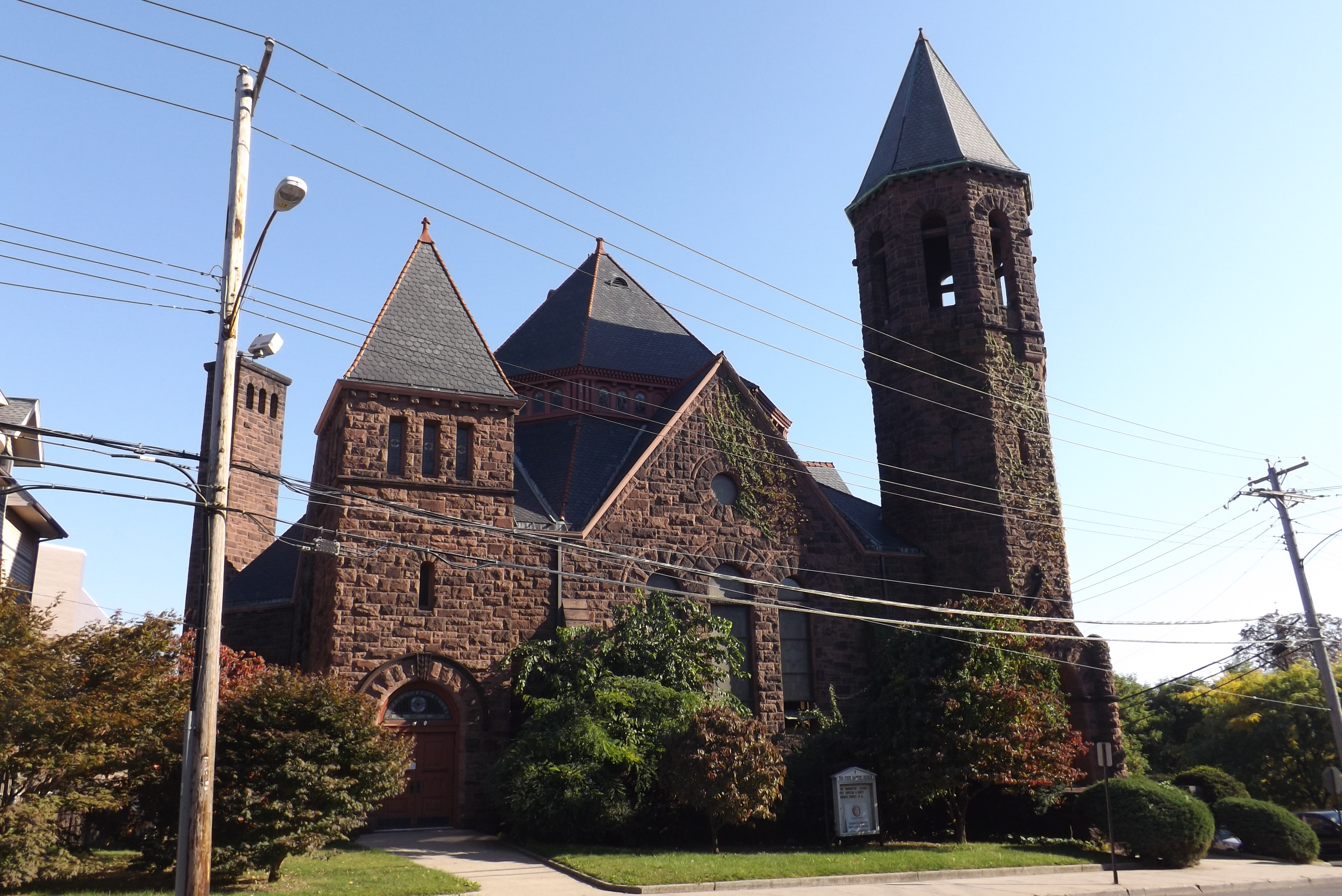
First Baptist Church, Bridgeport, 1893.

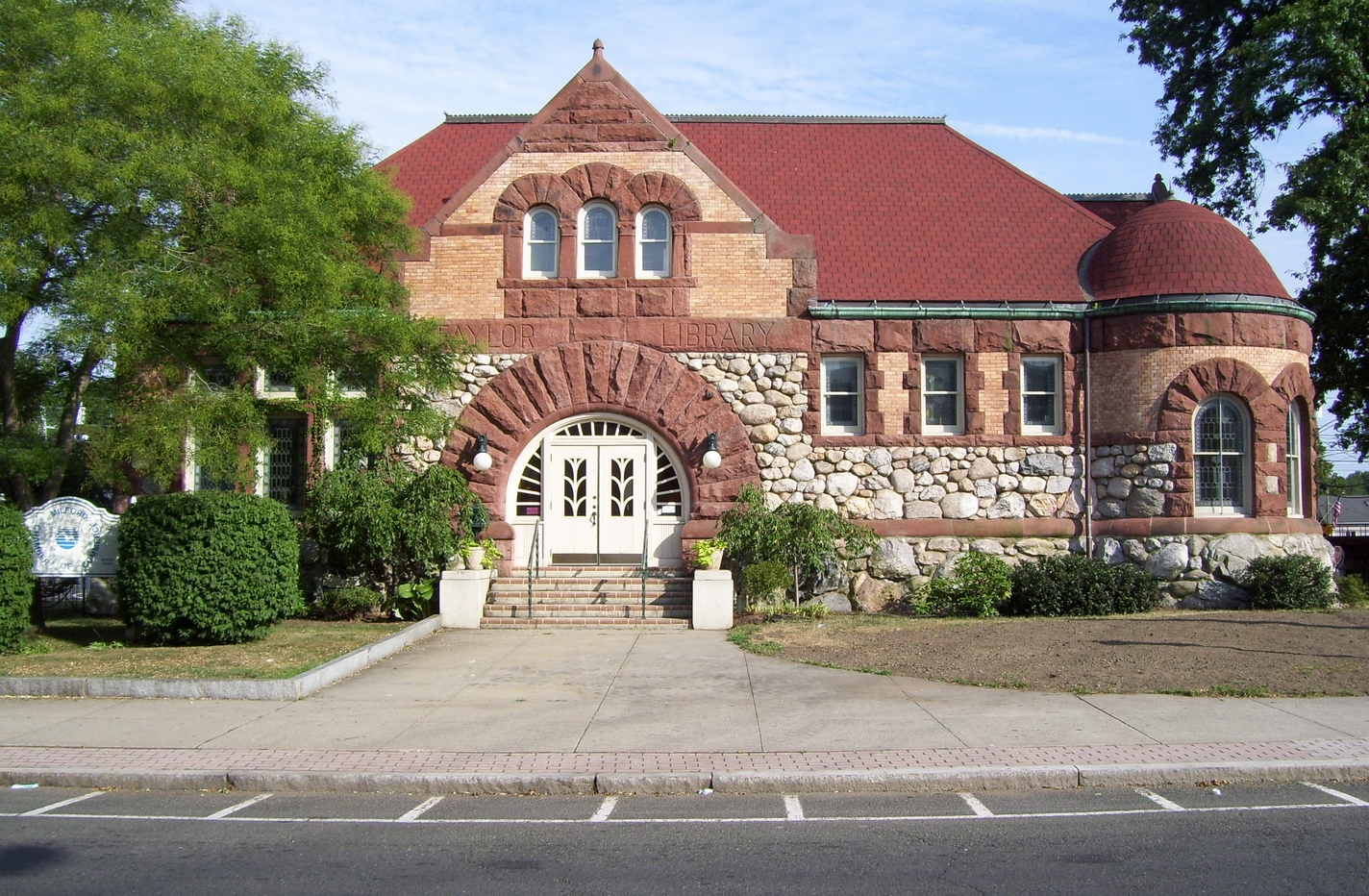
Taylor Memorial Library, Milford, 1894.

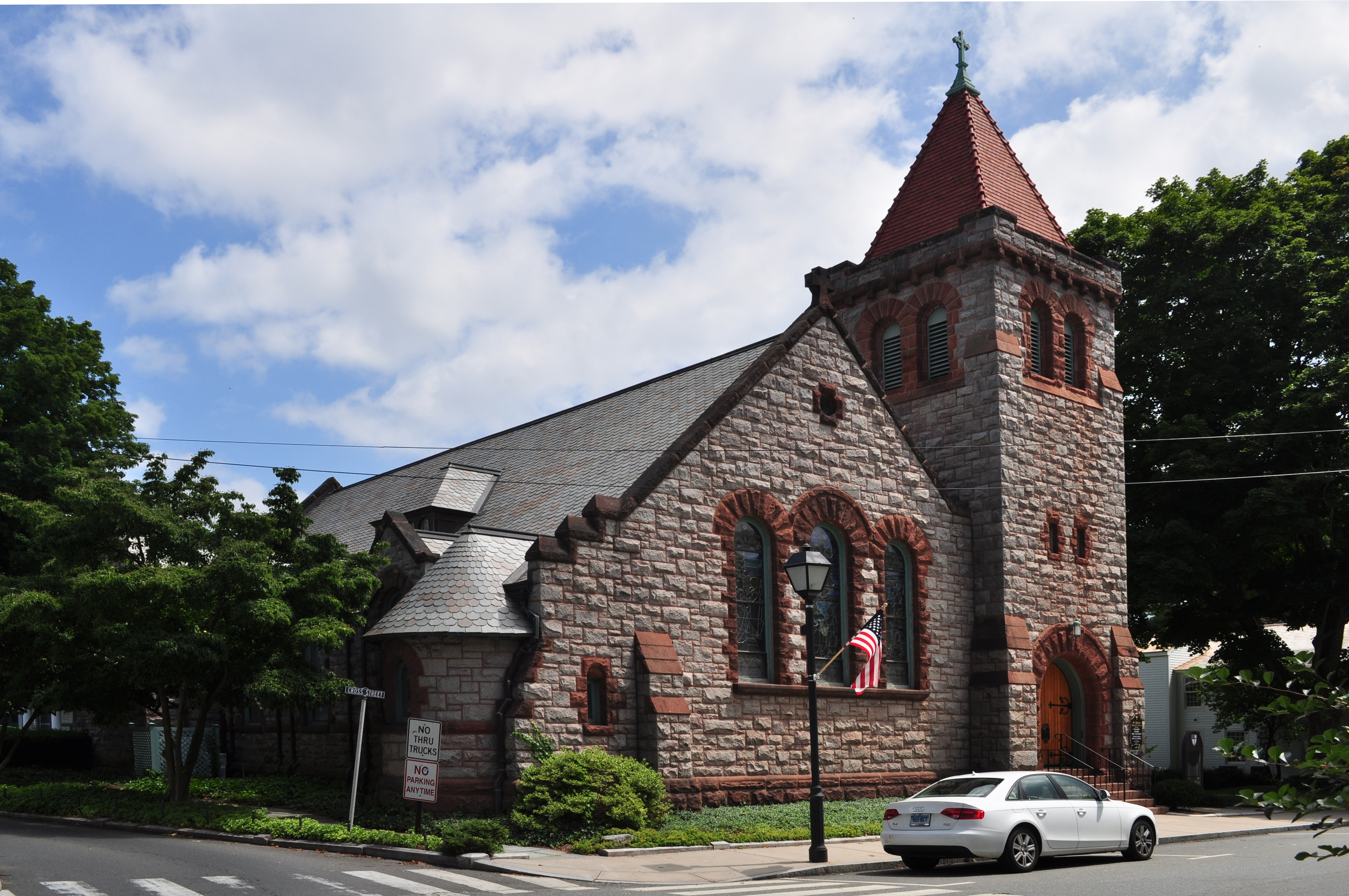
St. John's Episcopal Church, Essex, 1897.

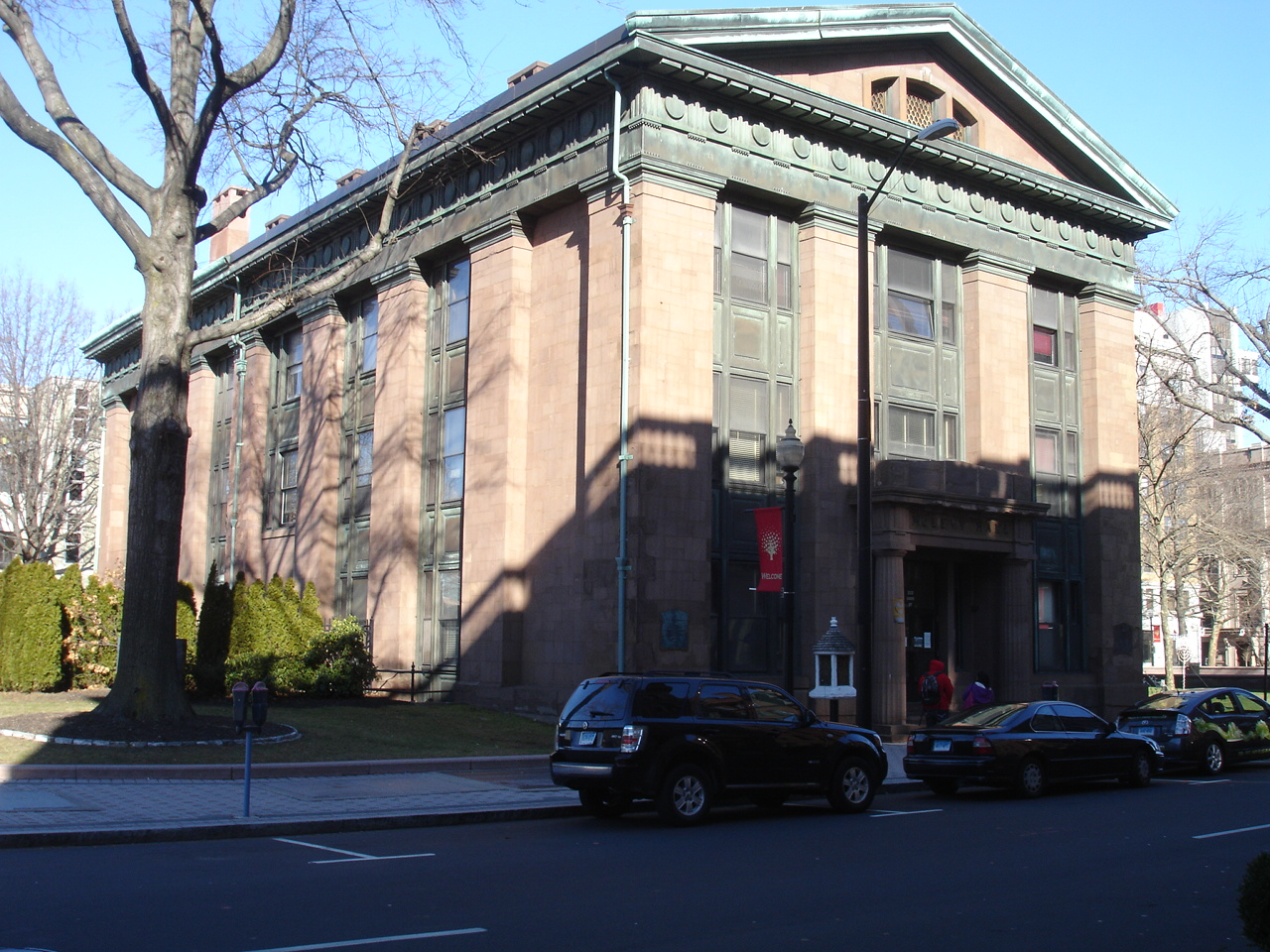
Bridgeport City Hall, Bridgeport, 1905.

Joseph Walter Northrop (1860–1940) was an American architect.

He practiced in Bridgeport, Connecticut and was prominent in that city in the late 19th and early 20th centuries. Northrop was born in New Haven on July 8, 1860. In 1882 he moved to Hartford where he worked for architect George Keller. In 1885 he relocated to Bridgeport to open his own office. He married Mary Alvira (Ogden) Northrop. He had a son, Joseph W. Northrop, Jr. (b. 1886), who would go on to be a prominent architect in Houston, Texas. Northrop died in Bridgeport May 24, 1940.

== Architectural works ==
=== Bridgeport, Connecticut ===
- Isaac W. Birdseye House, 733 Fairfield Avenue (1886) - Demolished
- Charles G. Downs House, 127 Broad Street (1887) - Demolished
- George Comstock House, 239 Park Avenue (1887) - still extant at the corner of Park Ave and Atlantic St
- Benjamin F. Squire House, 1601 Fairfield Avenue (1888–89) - Altered
- Edward W. Marsh House, 984 Fairfield Avenue (1888) - Demolished
- Frank Ashley Wilmot, Sr. House (President of American Tube & Stamping Mfg. Co.-formerly Wilmot & Hobbs Mfg. Co.) (1865-1915), 633 Clinton Avenue (1889) 'Stratfield Historic District' 'Number 3 in a series titled "Our Attractive Homes", published weekly in Bridgeport Standard; appeared 31 January 1891.' Currently (2017) used as office of Dr. James Caserta, DDS
- Willis F. Hobbs House (President of The Bridgeport Hardware Manufacturing Co.) (1854-1939) (Brother in Law of Frank Ashley Wilmot, Sr.), 579 Clinton Avenue (originally 303 Clinton Avenue) (1891) - Altered
- Thomas C. Wordin House, 1139 Fairfield Avenue (1892) - Now home to the local union of the Teamsters
- First Baptist Church, 126 Washington Avenue (1893–94)
- Thomas C. Wordin House, 33 Yale Street (1893) - An investment property. Altered
- Edward W. Harral House, 123 Harrison Street (1899) - Demolished. Currently the corner of Golden Hill & Lafayette
- Second Baptist Church, 774 Kossuth Street (1902)
- Burroughs Home for Women, 2470 Fairfield Avenue (1903) - Now the Burroughs Community Center
- Remodeling of Bridgeport City Hall, 202 State Street (1905) - No longer the city hall
- William R. Webster House, 208 Brooklawn Avenue (1906)
- Maplewood Avenue School Annex, 434 Maplewood Avenue (1908)
- Richard I. Neithercut House, 180 Brooklawn Avenue (1908)
- George T. Hatheway House, 800 Clinton Avenue (1910)
- Henry C. Stevenson House, 57 Coleman Street (1912)
- Read School, North Avenue between Garland & Reamer Streets (1914) - Demolished
- Edwin M. Jennings Co. Building, 2 Lafayette Square(1919) - Altered beyond recognition
- Stone Bridge, Beardsley Park(1921) - Connects Bunnell Island to the park mainland
- Summerfield M. E. Church, 110 Clermont Avenue (1922)
- D. M. Read Co. Department Store, 1142 Broad Street (1924–25) - In association with architects and engineers Monks & Johnson of Boston.
- Golden Hill Apartments, 225 Golden Hill Street (1925)
- Shelton (Cambridge) Apartments, 2209 Main Street (1931–32)

=== Other locations ===
- St. John's Episcopal Church, 23 Main Street, Essex, Connecticut (1897)
- Essex Public Library, 3 South Main Street, Essex, Connecticut (1898) - No longer used as the library
- Mary Taylor Memorial M. E. Church, 168 South Broad Street, Milford, Connecticut (1892)
- Taylor Memorial Library, 5 Broad Street, Milford, Connecticut (1894) - Now home to the Milford Chamber of Commerce.
- Lauralton Hall, 200 High Street, Milford, Connecticut (1897) - Built as the estate of Charles H. Pond in 1864. Henry A. Taylor had Northrop redesign the entire house. Now a girls' catholic school
- Colin M. Ingersoll House, 475 Whitney Avenue, New Haven, Connecticut (1896) - Described as a "knowledgeable variant of the Chateauesque mansions of Richard Morris Hunt"
- Lexington Tower, 369 Lexington Avenue, New York, New York (1926)
- First Reformed Church, 35 South Broadway, Yonkers, New York (1894) - Demolished
- St. Paul's Episcopal Church, 20 Fair Street, Nantucket, Massachusetts (1901–02)
