= Wisconsin Intercollegiate Athletic Conference =

NCAA Division III athletic conference

- Formerly: Inter-Normal Athletic Conference of Wisconsin (1913–1926); Wisconsin State Teachers College Conference (1926–1951); Wisconsin State College Conference (1951–1964); Wisconsin State University Athletic Conference (1964–1997)
- Association: NCAA
- Founded: 1913; 113 years ago
- Commissioner: Danielle Harris (since July 2020)
- Sports fielded: 24; men's: 11; women's: 13
- Division: Division III
- No. of teams: 8
- Headquarters: Madison, Wisconsin
- Region: Wisconsin
- Website: wiacsports.com

Locations
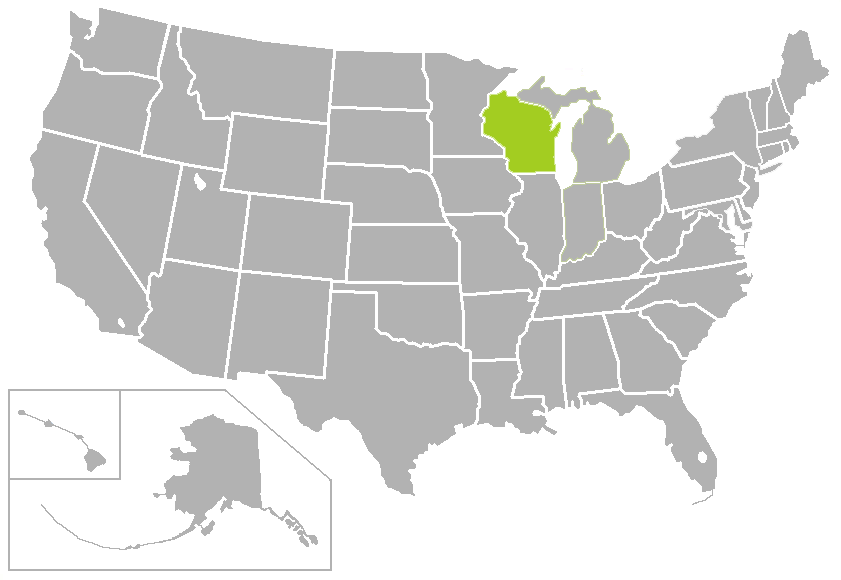

The Wisconsin Intercollegiate Athletic Conference (WIAC) is an intercollegiate athletic conference that competes in the NCAA's Division III. In women's gymnastics, it competes alongside Division I and II members, as the NCAA sponsors a single championship event open to members of all NCAA divisions. As the name implies, full members are located in the state of Wisconsin. There are 13 associate members, two from Wisconsin and 11 from various states. All full members are part of the University of Wisconsin System.

== History ==
In 1913, representatives from Wisconsin's eight normal schools—Superior Normal School (now the University of Wisconsin–Superior), River Falls State Normal School (now the University of Wisconsin-River Falls), Stevens Point Normal School (now the University of Wisconsin–Stevens Point), La Crosse State Normal School (now the University of Wisconsin–La Crosse), Oshkosh State Normal School (now the University of Wisconsin–Oshkosh), Whitewater Normal School (now the University of Wisconsin–Whitewater), Milwaukee State Normal School (now the University of Wisconsin–Milwaukee) and Platteville Normal School (now the University of Wisconsin–Platteville)—met in Madison to organize the Inter-Normal Athletic Conference of Wisconsin. The Stout Institute (now the University of Wisconsin–Stout Polytechnic) joined in 1914, followed by Eau Claire State Normal School (now the University of Wisconsin–Eau Claire) in 1917.

The conference evolved with the growing educational mission of its member schools. It changed its name to the Wisconsin State Teachers College Conference in 1926, and the Wisconsin State College Conference in 1951. Finally, in 1964, it became the Wisconsin State University Conference.

In 1971, the member schools of the WSUC joined with the University of Wisconsin–Madison, University of Wisconsin–Parkside and Carthage College to form the Wisconsin Women's Intercollegiate Athletic Conference. By 1975, UW–Milwaukee, Carroll College, the University of Wisconsin–Green Bay and Marquette University had also joined. With the dissolution of the Association of Intercollegiate Athletics for Women in 1982, the member schools joined their male counterparts in either the NCAA or NAIA. By 1993, the non-NCAA Division III members had all dropped out, resulting in the WWIAC having the same membership as the WSUC. Under the circumstances, a merger was inevitable. In 1996, Gary Karner was named commissioner of both the WSUC and the WWIAC. The two conferences formally merged in 1997 to form the current WIAC.

Effective with the 2001–02 academic year, Lawrence University joined the conference in the sport of wrestling. Three Minnesota schools, Gustavus Adolphus College, Hamline University and Winona State University, became members of the conference in the sport of women's gymnastics during the 2004–05 academic year. In 2009–10, the conference added men’s soccer as a sponsored sport with the announcement of Michigan school Finlandia University as an affiliate member. Lawrence discontinued its affiliation with the WIAC in wrestling.

The conference remained unusually stable over the years; the only changes in full membership being the departures of UW–Milwaukee in 1964 and UW–Superior in 2015.

=== Centennial celebration ===
The ninth-oldest conference in the nation, the WIAC celebrated its centennial year during the 2012–13 academic year. Additionally, the WIAC is the most successful NCAA Division III conference in history, boasting NCAA National Championships in 14 different sports. At the beginning of the 2011–12 academic year, the conference had claimed a nation-leading 92 NCAA National Championships.

To celebrate its centennial, the conference named All-Time Teams in each sport that is currently or was previously recognized as a "championship" sport within the conference. Furthermore, the WIAC commissioned a commemorative work of art, created by Tim Cortes, and has also created a two-year calendar in celebration of its centennial.

The celebration was headlined by its Centennial Banquet held on August 4, 2012, at the Alliant Energy Center in Madison, Wisconsin. Among the honorees at the event were the All-Time Team members and the inaugural class to the WIAC Hall of Fame.

=== Chronological timeline ===
WIAC, full members
- 1913 – The WIAC was founded as the Inter-Normal Athletic Conference of Wisconsin (INACW). Charter members included La Crosse State Normal School (now the University of Wisconsin–La Crosse), Milwaukee State Normal School (now the University of Wisconsin–Milwaukee), Oshkosh State Normal School (now the University of Wisconsin–Oshkosh), Platteville Normal School (now the University of Wisconsin–Platteville), River Falls State Normal School (now the University of Wisconsin–River Falls), Stevens Point Normal School (now the University of Wisconsin–Stevens Point), Superior Normal School (now the University of Wisconsin–Superior) and Whitewater Normal School (now the University of Wisconsin–Whitewater), beginning the 1913–14 academic year.
- 1914 – Stout Institute (now the University of Wisconsin–Stout Polytechnic) joined the INACW in the 1914–15 academic year.
- 1917 – Eau Claire State Normal School (now the University of Wisconsin–Eau Claire) joined the INACW in the 1917–18 academic year.
- 1926 – The INACW was rebranded as the Wisconsin State Teachers College Conference (WSTCC), beginning the 1926–27 academic year.
- 1951 – The WSTCC was rebranded as the Wisconsin State College Conference (WSCC), beginning the 1951–52 academic year.
- 1964:
  - Wisconsin–Milwaukee (UW Milwaukee) left the WSTCC to become an NCAA College Division Independent after the 1963–64 academic year.
  - The WSCC was rebranded as the Wisconsin State University Conference (WSUC), beginning the 1964–65 academic year.
  - The WSCC was also affiliated with the National Association of Intercollegiate Athletics (NAIA), beginning the 1964–65 academic year.
- 1993 – The WSUC left the NAIA and became affiliated as a member of the Division III ranks of the National Collegiate Athletic Association (NCAA), beginning the 1993–94 academic year.
- 1997 – The WSUC was merged with the Wisconsin Women's Intercollegiate Athletic Conference (WWIAC, a women's athletic conference) and was rebranded as the Wisconsin Intercollegiate Athletic Conference (WIAC), beginning the 1997–98 academic year.
- 2001 – Lawrence University joined the WIAC as an affiliate member for men's wrestling in the 2001–02 academic year; although it began competition a season later.
- 2004 – Gustavus Adolphus College, Hamline University and Winona State University joined the WIAC as affiliate members for women's gymnastics in the 2004–05 academic year.
- 2009:
  - Lawrence left the WIAC as an affiliate member for men's wrestling after the 2008–09 academic year.
  - Finlandia University joined the WIAC as an affiliate member for men's soccer in the 2009 fall season (2009–10 academic year).
- 2014 – Men's soccer was dropped as a conference sport after the fall 2014 season (2014–15 academic year).
- 2015:
  - Finlandia left the WIAC as an affiliate member for men's soccer when the WIAC dropped that sport.
  - Wisconsin–Superior (UW Superior) left the WIAC to join the Upper Midwest Athletic Conference (UMAC) after the 2014–15 academic year; while remaining in the conference as an affiliate member for men's & women's ice hockey, beginning the 2015–16 school year.
- 2017 – The Illinois Institute of Technology (Illinois Tech or IIT) joined the WIAC as an affiliate member for baseball in the 2018 spring season (2017–18 academic year).
- 2018:
  - Illinois Tech (IIT) left the WIAC as an affiliate member for baseball after the 2018 spring season (2017–18 academic year).
  - Finlandia rejoined the WIAC as an affiliate member (this time for baseball) in the 2019 spring season (2018–19 academic year).
- 2019 – Northland College joined the WIAC as an affiliate member for men's and women's ice hockey in the 2019–20 academic year.
- 2023:
  - Finlandia left the WIAC as an affiliate member for baseball after the 2023 spring season (2022–23 academic year); as the school ceased operations.
  - Three institutions joined the WIAC as affiliate members, all effective in the 2024 spring season (2023–24 academic year):
    - Colorado College and Southwestern University of Texas for women's lacrosse
    - and Rutgers University–Camden, Ramapo College, the State University of New York at Oneonta (SUNY Oneonta) and The College of New Jersey (TCNJ) for men's tennis
- 2024:
  - Ramapo left the WIAC as an affiliate member for men's tennis after the 2024 spring season (2023–24 academic year).
  - Men's soccer was reinstated as a conference sport effective with the 2024 fall season.
  - Augsburg University and College of Saint Benedict (with Hamline alongside) joined the WIAC as affiliate members for women's lacrosse in the 2025 spring season (2024–25 academic year).
- 2025:
  - Northland (WI) left the WIAC as an affiliate member for men's and women's ice hockey after the 2024–25 academic year, as the school announced its closure.
  - Beloit College joined the WIAC as an affiliate member for men's and women's ice hockey in the 2025–26 academic year.
- 2026:
  - SUNY Oneonta left the WIAC as an affiliate member for men's tennis to join the Empire 8 at the end of the 2026 spring season (2025–26 academic year).
  - Greenville University joined the WIAC as an affiliate member for women's gymnastics, beginning with the 2026–27 academic year.
  - UW Superior added women's lacrosse to its affiliate membership, beginning in the 2027 spring season (2026–27 academic year).

== Member schools ==
=== Current members ===
The WIAC currently has eight full members; all are public schools and part of the University of Wisconsin System:

Institution	Location (Note: All cities are located with the State of Wisconsin.)	Founded	Affiliation	Enrollment	Nickname	Joined (Note: Represents the calendar year when fall sports competition begins.)	Colors
University of Wisconsin–Eau Claire (UW–Eau Claire)	Eau Claire	1916	Public	10,043	Blugolds	1917	
University of Wisconsin–La Crosse (UW–La Crosse)	La Crosse	1909	Public	9,708	Eagles	1913	
University of Wisconsin–Oshkosh (UW–Oshkosh)	Oshkosh	1871	Public	15,111	Titans	1913	
University of Wisconsin–Platteville (UW–Platteville)	Platteville	1866	Public	8,134	Pioneers	1913	
University of Wisconsin–River Falls (UW–River Falls)	River Falls	1874	Public	5,725	Falcons	1913	
University of Wisconsin–Stevens Point (UW–Stevens Point)	Stevens Point	1894	Public	8,792	Pointers	1913	
University of Wisconsin–Stout Polytechnic (UW–Stout Polytechnic)	Menomonie	1891	Public	7,555	Blue Devils	1914	
University of Wisconsin–Whitewater (UW–Whitewater)	Whitewater	1868	Public	11,722	Warhawks	1913	

=== Affiliate members ===
The WIAC currently has thirteen affiliate members, all but five are private schools:

Institution	Location	Founded	Affiliation	Enrollment	Nickname	Joined (Note: Represents the calendar year when fall sports competition begins.)	Colors	WIAC sport(s)	Primary conference
Augsburg University	Minneapolis, Minnesota	1869	Lutheran ELCA	3,152	Auggies	2024		Women's lacrosse	Minnesota (MIAC)
Beloit College	Beloit, Wisconsin	1846	Nonsectarian	1,358	Buccaneers	2025		Men's ice hockey	Midwest (MWC)
Beloit College	Beloit, Wisconsin	1846	Nonsectarian	1,358	Buccaneers	2025		Women's ice hockey	Midwest (MWC)
College of Saint Benedict	St. Joseph, Minnesota	1913	Catholic (Benedictines)	1,410	Bennies	2024		Women's lacrosse	Minnesota (MIAC)
Colorado College	Colorado Springs, Colorado	1874	Nonsectarian	2,266	Tigers	2023		Women's lacrosse	Southern (SCAC)
Greenville University	Greenville, Illinois	1892	Free Methodist	1,088	Panthers	2026		Gymnastics	St. Louis (SLIAC)
Gustavus Adolphus College	St. Peter, Minnesota	1862	Lutheran ELCA	2,600	Golden; Gusties	2004		Gymnastics	Minnesota (MIAC)
Hamline University	Saint Paul, Minnesota	1854	United; Methodist	2,100	Pipers	2004		Gymnastics	Minnesota (MIAC)
Hamline University	Saint Paul, Minnesota	1854	United; Methodist	2,100	Pipers	2024		Women's lacrosse	Minnesota (MIAC)
Rutgers University–Camden	Camden, New Jersey	1950	Public	5,450	Scarlet; Raptors	2023		Men's tennis	New Jersey (NJAC)
Simpson College	Indianola, Iowa	1860	Private	1,225	Storm	2024		Gymnastics	American Rivers (A-R-C)
Southwestern University	Georgetown, Texas	1840	United; Methodist	1,536	Pirates	2023		Women's lacrosse	Southern (SAA)
The College of New Jersey	Ewing, New Jersey	1855	Public	7,400	Lions	2023		Men's tennis	New Jersey (NJAC)
University of Wisconsin–Superior (UW Superior)	Superior, Wisconsin	1893	Public (Note: Part of the University of Wisconsin System.)	2,294	Yellowjackets	2015 (Note: Wisconsin–Superior had been a full member of the WIAC from 1913–14 to 2014–15. However, they remain as affiliate members for men's and women's ice hockey.)		Men's ice hockey	Upper Midwest (UMAC)
University of Wisconsin–Superior (UW Superior)	Superior, Wisconsin	1893	Public	2,294	Yellowjackets	2015		Women's ice hockey	Upper Midwest (UMAC)
University of Wisconsin–Superior (UW Superior)	Superior, Wisconsin	1893	Public	2,294	Yellowjackets	2026		Women's lacrosse (Note: UW-Superior women's lacrosse became an affiliate member of WIAC in 2026.)	Upper Midwest (UMAC)
Winona State University	Winona, Minnesota	1858	Public	8,896	Warriors	2004		Gymnastics	Northern Sun (NSIC) (Note: Currently an NCAA Division II athletic conference.)

=== Former members ===
The WIAC had two former full members, both were public schools:

Institution	Location (Note: Both cities are located within the State of Wisconsin.)	Founded	Affiliation	Enrollment	Nickname	Joined (Note: Represents the calendar year when fall sports competition begins.)	Left (Note: Represents the calendar year when spring sports competition ends.)	Current conference
University of Wisconsin–Milwaukee (Note: Now known for athletics purposes as "Milwaukee".) (UW–Milwaukee)	Milwaukee	1885	Public (Note: Part of the University of Wisconsin System.)	22,767	Cardinals (Note: Nickname changed to the current "Panthers" name, effective in the 1964–65 school year, immediately after leaving the league.)	1913	1964	Horizon (Note: Currently an NCAA Division I athletic conference.)
University of Wisconsin–Superior (UW–Superior)	Superior	1893	Public	2,294	Yellowjackets	1913	2015	Upper Midwest (UMAC)

=== Former affiliate members ===
The WIAC had five former affiliate members, all but one were private schools:

Institution	Location	Founded	Affiliation	Enrollment	Nickname	Joined (Note: Represents the calendar year when fall sports competition begins.)	Left (Note: Represents the calendar year when spring sports competition ends.)	WIAC sport(s)	Current conference
Finlandia University	Hancock, Michigan	1896	Lutheran ELCA	500	Lions	2009	2015	Men's soccer	Closed in 2023
Finlandia University	Hancock, Michigan	1896	Lutheran ELCA	500	Lions	2018	2023	Baseball	Closed in 2023
Illinois Institute of Technology (Illinois Tech)	Chicago, Illinois	1890	Nonsectarian	2,977	Scarlet Hawks	2017	2018	Baseball	Northern (NACC)
Lawrence University	Appleton, Wisconsin	1847	Nonsectarian	1,555	Vikings	2002	2009	Men's wrestling	Midwest (MWC)
Northland College	Ashland, Wisconsin	1906	United Church of Christ	700	LumberJacks & LumberJills	2019	2025	Men's ice hockey	Closed in 2025
Northland College	Ashland, Wisconsin	1906	United Church of Christ	700	LumberJacks & LumberJills	2019	2025	Women's ice hockey	Closed in 2025
State University of New York at Oneonta	Oneonta, New York	1889	Public (Note: Part of the State University of New York System.)	6,543	Red Dragons	2023	2026	Men's tennis	S.U. New York (SUNYAC)
Ramapo College	Mahwah, New Jersey	1969	Public	5,145	Roadrunners	2023	2024	Men's tennis	New Jersey (NJAC)

=== Membership timeline ===
Full member (all sports) Full member (non-football) Associate member (football) Associate member (sport)

== Sports ==
Member institutions field men's and women's teams in cross country, basketball, ice hockey, soccer, track and field, and swimming and diving. Men's teams are fielded for baseball, football, and wrestling. Women's teams are fielded for golf, gymnastics, lacrosse, softball, tennis and volleyball.

Conference sports
Sport	Men's	Women's
Baseball	✓	
Basketball	✓	✓
Cross country	✓	✓
Football	✓	
Golf		✓
Gymnastics		✓
Ice hockey	✓	✓
Lacrosse		✓
Soccer	✓	✓
Softball		✓
Swimming & diving	✓	✓
Tennis	✓	✓
Track and field (indoor)	✓	✓
Track and field (outdoor)	✓	✓
Volleyball		✓
Wrestling	✓	

=== Men's sponsored sports by school ===
School	Baseball	Basketball	Cross country	Football	Ice hockey	Soccer	Swimming & diving	Tennis	Track & field (indoor)	Track & field (outdoor)	Wrestling	Total WIAC sports
Wisconsin–Eau Claire	✓	✓	✓	✓	✓	✓	✓	✓	✓	✓	✓	11
Wisconsin–La Crosse	✓	✓	✓	✓	✗	✗	✓	✓	✓	✓	✓	9
Wisconsin–Oshkosh	✓	✓	✓	✓	✗	✗ (Note: UW–Oshkosh will reinstate men's soccer in 2027–28.)	✓	✗	✓	✓	✓	8
Wisconsin–Platteville	✓	✓	✓	✓	✗	✓	✗	✗	✓	✓	✓	8
Wisconsin–River Falls	✓	✓	✓	✓	✓	✓	✗	✗	✓	✓	✗	7
Wisconsin–Stevens Point	✓	✓	✓	✓	✓	✓	✓	✓	✓	✓	✓	11
Wisconsin–Stout Polytechnic	✓	✓	✓	✓	✓	✓	✗	✗	✓	✓	✗	8
Wisconsin–Whitewater	✓	✓	✓	✓	✗	✓	✓	✓	✓	✓	✓	10
Totals	8	8	8	8	4+1 (Note: Affiliate member Wisconsin–Superior.)	6	5	4+2 (Note: Affiliate members Rutgers–Camden and TCNJ.)	8	8	6	77

==== Men's varsity sports not sponsored by the WIAC ====
School	Golf	Volleyball
Wisconsin–Eau Claire	Ind.	No
Wisconsin–Stevens Point	Ind.	Ind.
Wisconsin–Stout Polytechnic	Ind.	No

=== Women's sponsored sports by school ===
School	Basketball	Cross country	Golf	Gymnastics (Note: De facto Division I sport; the NCAA women's gymnastics championship is open to members of all NCAA divisions.)	Ice hockey	Lacrosse	Soccer	Softball	Swimming & diving	Tennis	Track & field (indoor)	Track & field (outdoor)	Volleyball	Total WIAC sports
Wisconsin–Eau Claire	✓	✓	✓	✓	✓	✓	✓	✓	✓	✓	✓	✓	✓	13
Wisconsin–La Crosse	✓	✓	✓	✓	✗	✓	✓	✓	✓	✓	✓	✓	✓	12
Wisconsin–Oshkosh	✓	✓	✓	✓	✗	✗	✓	✓	✓	✓	✓	✓	✓	11
Wisconsin–Platteville	✓	✓	✓	✗	✗	✗	✓	✓	✗	✗	✓	✓	✓	8
Wisconsin–River Falls	✓	✓	✓	✗	✓	✓	✓	✓	✗	✓	✓	✓	✓	11
Wisconsin–Stevens Point	✓	✓	✓	✗	✓	✓	✓	✓	✓	✓	✓	✓	✓	12
Wisconsin–Stout Polytechnic	✓	✓	✓	✓	✗	✓	✓	✓	✗	✓	✓	✓	✓	11
Wisconsin–Whitewater	✓	✓	✓	✓	✗	✗	✓	✓	✓	✓	✓	✓	✓	11
Totals	8	8	8	5+5 (Note: Affiliate members Greenville,. Gustavus Adolphus, Hamline, Simpson, and Winona State.)	3+1 (Note: Affiliate member Wisconsin–Superior.)	5+6 (Note: Affiliate members Augsburg, Colorado College, Hamline, Saint Benedict, Southwestern (TX), and UW Superior.)	8	8	5	7	8	8	8	89+10

==== Women's varsity sports not sponsored by the WIAC ====
School	Bowling (Note: De facto Division I sport. The NCAA championship is open to members of all NCAA divisions through the 2026–27 season. Its status with respect to Division III is not expected to be affected by the establishment of a dedicated Division II championship in 2027–28.)	Flag football (Note: Part of the NCAA Emerging Sports for Women program.)	Wrestling (Note: De facto Division I sport through the 2026–27 season. A dedicated Division III championship will be established in 2027–28.)
Wisconsin–Oshkosh	No	Ind.	Ind.
Wisconsin–Stevens Point	No	No	Ind.
Wisconsin–Stout Polytechnic	No	Ind.	No
Wisconsin–Whitewater	Ind.	No	No

== National championship teams ==
=== NCAA Division III national championships ===
Listed below are the NCAA Division III team national championships won by WIAC members.

- Baseball

UW–Oshkosh: 1985, 1994
UW–Whitewater: 2005, 2014, 2025

- Men's basketball

UW–Whitewater: 1984, 1989, 2012, 2014
UW–Platteville: 1991, 1995, 1998, 1999
UW–Stevens Point: 2004, 2005, 2010, 2015
UW–Oshkosh: 2019

- Women's Basketball

UW–Stevens Point: 1987, 2002
UW–Oshkosh: 1996

- Men's Cross Country

UW–Oshkosh: 1988, 1989, 1990, 2002
UW–La Crosse: 1996, 2001, 2005, 2024, 2025
UW–Eau Claire: 2015

- Women's Cross Country

UW–La Crosse: 1983
UW–Oshkosh: 1987, 1988, 1991, 1996
UW–Eau Claire: 2009

- Football

UW–La Crosse: 1992, 1995
UW–River Falls: 2025
UW–Whitewater: 2007, 2009, 2010, 2011, 2013, 2014

- Men's Golf

UW–Eau Claire: 2001

- Men's Ice Hockey

UW–River Falls: 1988, 1994
UW–Stevens Point: 1989, 1990, 1991, 1993, 2016, 2019
UW–Superior: 2002
UW–Eau Claire: 2013

- Softball

UW–Stevens Point: 1998
UW–Eau Claire: 2008

- Women's Ice Hockey

UW-River Falls: 2024, 2025, 2026

- Men's Indoor Track & Field

UW–La Crosse: 1987, 1988, 1991, 1992, 1993, 1994, 1997, 2001, 2002, 2003, 2004, 2005, 2006, 2008, 2009, 2013, 2014, 2017, 2023, 2024, 2025
UW–Oshkosh: 2009
UW–Eau Claire: 2015, 2016, 2022

- Men's Outdoor Track & Field

UW–La Crosse: 1988, 1991, 1992, 1993, 1997, 2001, 2002, 2003, 2004, 2006, 2007, 2013, 2015, 2016, 2017, 2024, 2025, 2026
UW–Oshkosh: 2009
UW–Eau Claire: 2019, 2022

- Women's Indoor Track & Field

UW–Oshkosh: 1994–96, 2004, 2005, 2006, 2011, 2013, 2014
UW–La Crosse: 2015, 2023

- Women's Outdoor Track & Field

UW–La Crosse: 1983, 1984, 2015, 2023, 2026
UW–Oshkosh: 1990, 1991, 1995, 1996, 1997, 2004, 2006, 2007, 2011
UW–River Falls: 2008

- Women's Volleyball

UW–Whitewater: 2002, 2005
UW–Eau Claire: 2021
UW-Oshkosh: 2025

=== Non-NCAA national championships ===
Many members of the WIAC have also won national championships from organizations other than the NCAA, including: NAIA, AIAW, NGCA, and National Collegiate Gymnastics Association (NCGA).

==== UW–Eau Claire ====
Women's Cross Country: 1984^

Men's Ice Hockey: 1984^

Women's Swimming and Diving: 1983^, 1987^, 1988^

==== UW–La Crosse ====
Women's Basketball: 1981^^

Men's Bowling: 1967^, 1968^, 1969^

Football: 1985^

Men's Gymnastics: 1975^, 1976^, 1977^

Women's Gymnastics: 1986*, 1988*, 1995*, 1997*, 1999*, 2001*, 2002*, 2003*, 2004*, 2005*, 2006*, 2008*, 2009*, 2010*, 2011*, 2015*, 2016*, 2025*

Women's Outdoor Track and Field: 1982^^

==== UW–Oshkosh ====
Men's Gymnastics: 1973^, 1974^, 1978^, 1979^, 1980^ (and NCAA Div. II), 1981^ (and NCAA Div. II), 1982^ (and NCAA Div. II), 1983^

Women's Gymnastics: 1980^^, 1986^, 1989*, 2007*, 2022*, 2023*, 2024*, 2026*

==== UW–River Falls ====
Men's Ice Hockey: 1983^

==== UW–Stout Polytechnic ====
Men's Gymnastics: 1984^

==== UW–Whitewater ====
Women's Golf: 1985%

Women's Gymnastics: 2012*, 2013*, 2014*, 2017*, 2018*

==== UW–Superior (former member) ====
Men's Ice Hockey: 1976^

==== Marquette University (former member) ====
Women's Cross Country: 1982^

==== UW–Green Bay (former member) ====
Women's Swimming and Diving: 1984^

==== UW–Parkside (former member) ====
Women's Cross Country: 1980^

^ National Association of Intercollegiate Athletics (NAIA)

^^ Association for Intercollegiate Athletics for Women (AIAW)

* National Collegiate Gymnastics Association (NCGA)

% National Golf Coaches Association (NGCA)

== Conference facilities ==
School	Football stadium	Capacity	Basketball arena	Capacity
UW–Eau Claire	Carson Park	6,500	Sonnentag Event Center	5,000
UW–La Crosse	Veterans Memorial Stadium	10,000	Mitchell Hall	2,880
UW–Oshkosh	Titan Stadium	9,800	Kolf Sports Center	5,800
UW–Platteville	Ralph E. Davis Pioneer Stadium	10,000	Williams Fieldhouse	2,300
UW–River Falls	Ramer Field	4,800	Don Page Arena	2,149
UW–Stevens Point	Goerke Field	4,000	Quandt Fieldhouse	3,281
UW–Stout Polytechnic	Don and Nona Williams Stadium	4,500	Johnson Fieldhouse	1,800
UW–Whitewater	Forrest Perkins Stadium	21,000	Williams Center	3,000
