= Titan Stadium (UW–Oshkosh) =

Sports stadium in Oshkosh, Wisconsin

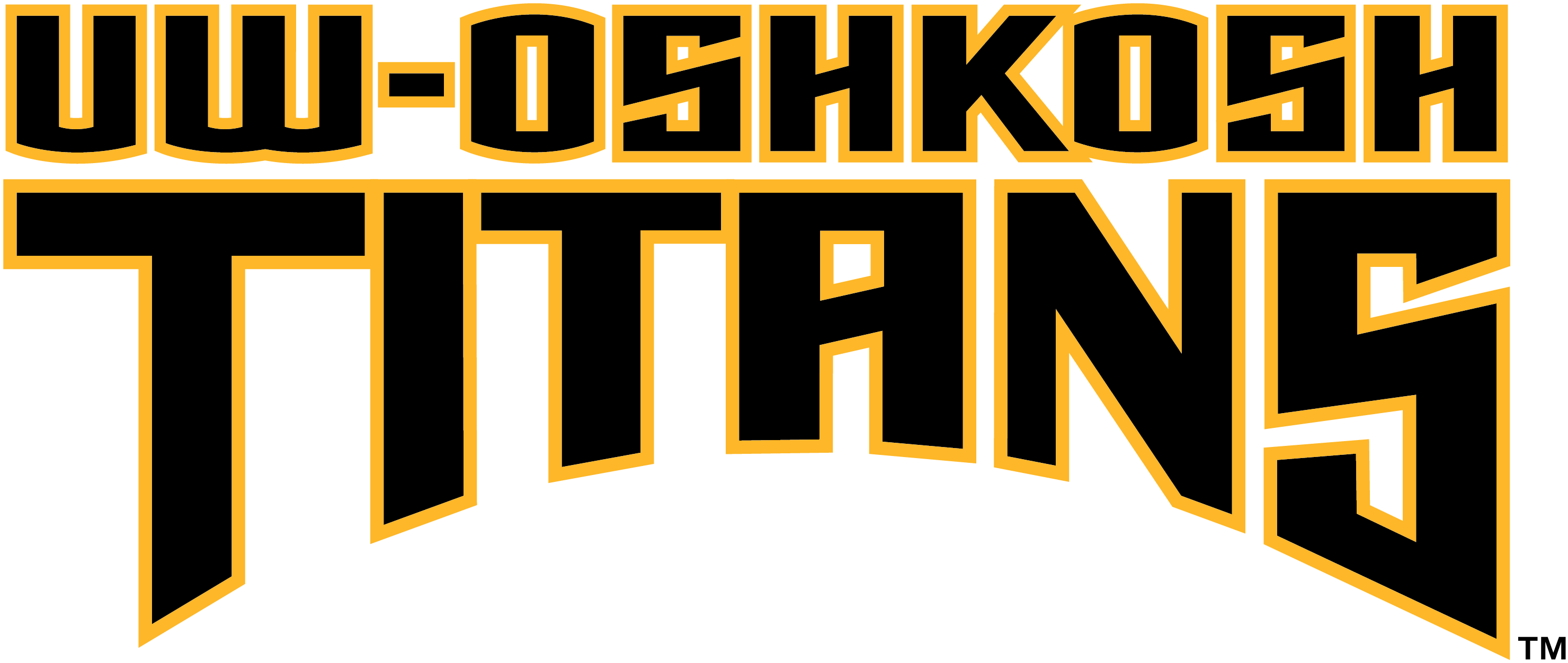

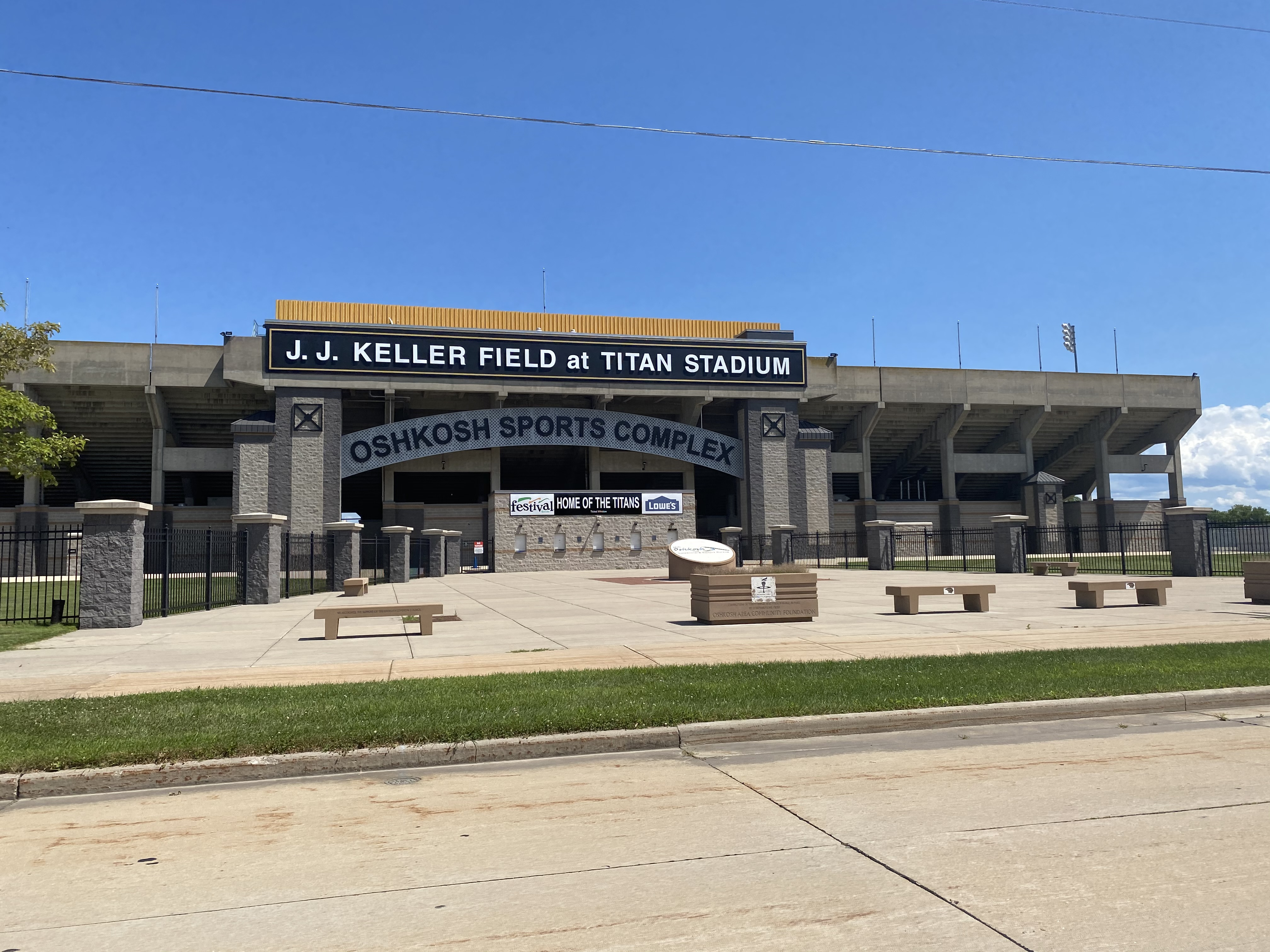
- Exterior view of the stadium in 2020
- Interactive map of Titan Stadium
- Full name: J. J. Keller Field at Titan Stadium
- Address: 450 Josslyn Street; Oshkosh, Wisconsin; United States
- Coordinates: 44°1′25″N 88°33′47″W
- Owner: UW-Oshkosh
- Operator: UW-Oshkosh Athletics
- Capacity: 9,800
- Type: Stadium
- Surface: Synthetic turf
- Current use: Football; Soccer; Track and field

Construction
- Opened: 1970; 56 years ago
- Renovated: 2004

Tenants
- Wisconsin–Oshkosh Titans teams: football, soccer, track and field

Website
- uwoshkoshtitans.com/titan-stadium

J. J. Keller Field at Titan Stadium is a multi-purpose stadium at the University of Wisconsin–Oshkosh in Oshkosh, Wisconsin. It was named after John J. Keller, founder of J. J. Keller & Associates, Inc., a safety and compliance solutions company located in Neenah, Wisconsin, with funds from the John J. & Ethel D. Keller fund at the Community Foundation of the Fox Valley Region.

The stadium is home venue to the Wisconsin–Oshkosh Titans football, soccer, and track and field teams.

== History ==
The stadium was built in 1970. The stadium accommodates up to 9,800 people. It was renovated in 2004 for nearly $10 Million to upgrade the facility, include the capability to play soccer, as well as a turf field.

The stadium has one large grandstand on the West side of the field. There is a running track around the stadium. The football playing field is not centered, rather it is closer to the grandstand, improving visibility from there.

There is, in addition, a smaller running track/soccer field located next to Titan Stadium.

In 2007 and 2008, the DIII National Track and Field Championships were hosted at Titan Stadium.

The stadium is also used for home games/meets for the Oshkosh high schools; Oshkosh West Wildcats, Oshkosh North Spartans, and Oshkosh Lourdes Knights. Other sports facilities at the university are Kolf Sports Center, Tiedemann Field, and Albee Hall.
