= University of Wisconsin–Oshkosh =

Public university in Oshkosh, Wisconsin, US

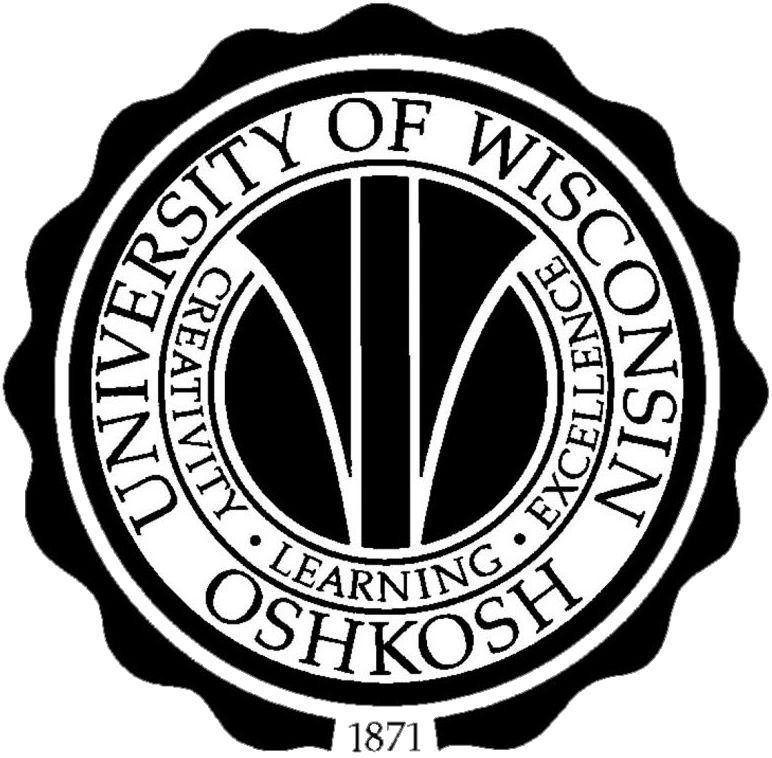
- Former names: Oshkosh State Normal School (1871–1927); Oshkosh State Teachers College (1927–1951); Wisconsin State College Oshkosh (1951–1971)
- Type: Public university
- Established: 1871; 155 years ago
- Parent institution: University of Wisconsin System
- Accreditation: HLC
- Endowment: $22 million (2017)
- Budget: $250.5 million (2019)
- Chancellor: Manohar Singh
- Provost: Edwin Martini
- Students: 12,964 (fall 2024)
- Undergraduates: 6,927 (fall 2024)
- Postgraduates: 959 (fall 2024)
- Location: Oshkosh, Wisconsin, United States; 44.0267°N 88.5508°W
- Campus: 173.5 acres (70 ha); Small city
- Other campuses: Fond du Lac; Menasha
- Newspaper: The Advance-Titan; The Fox Journal
- Colors: Black, gold, and white
- Nickname: Titans
- Sporting affiliations: NCAA Division III - WIAC
- Mascot: Clash
- Website: uwosh.edu
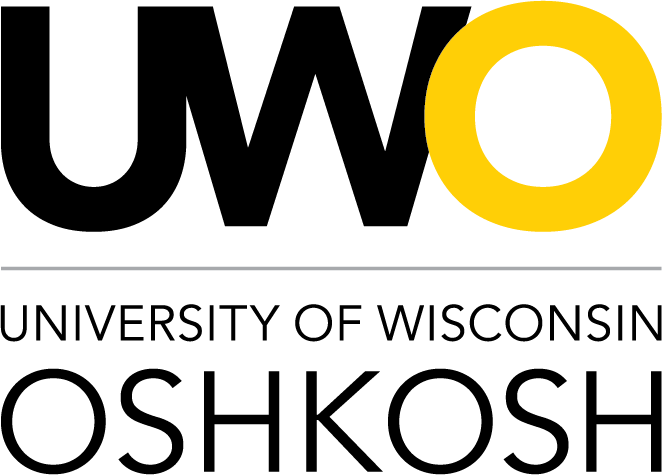

The University of Wisconsin–Oshkosh (UWO or UW–Oshkosh) is a public university in Oshkosh, Wisconsin, United States. It is part of the Universities of Wisconsin System and offers bachelor's, master's, and doctoral degree programs.

== History ==
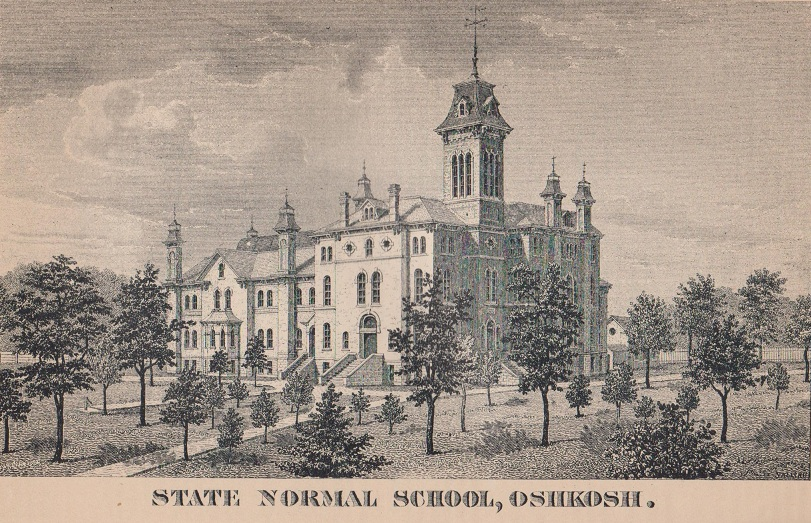
Oshkosh Normal School in 1885

In 1871, Oshkosh State Normal School, a teacher-training school was established. It became the first school of this type in the nation to have a kindergarten; Professor Rose C. Swart introduced practice teaching in 1872. Tuition was originally free to all who declared their intention to teach in Wisconsin public schools.

Fire destroyed the main campus building in 1916; Dempsey Hall replaced it in 1918. The institution changed its name to Oshkosh State Teachers College in 1927 and Wisconsin State College-Oshkosh in 1951. Graduate school was added in 1963. In 1971, the institution merged into the University of Wisconsin System, becoming the University of Wisconsin–Oshkosh. The university has pledged a campus goal of being carbon-neutral by 2030.

The University of Wisconsin System dissolved the University of Wisconsin Colleges in 2018 and their campuses became affiliated with area universities in the system. University of Wisconsin–Oshkosh formerly operated satellite campuses in Fond du Lac, Wisconsin as University of Wisconsin–Oshkosh, Fond du Lac Campus (formerly UW-Fond du Lac) and Menasha, Wisconsin as University of Wisconsin–Oshkosh, Fox Cities Campus (formerly UW-Fox Valley).

In 2023, the university faced significant financial challenges. State legislators had imposed a tuition freeze through 2021, enrollment had declined, and the state legislature cut the university system's budget by $32 million (the amount equal to what they believed was previously spent on diversity and equity programs and services throughout the system). In response, the university planned to address its $18 million deficit by requiring all employees to take furlough days and eliminating 200 non-faculty jobs. In April 2024, the faculty responded with a vote of no confidence in then-Chancellor Andrew Leavitt's leadership.

== Campus ==
Four locations on the campus have been listed on Registered Historic Places.

- Oshkosh State Normal School Historic District
- U.S. National Register of Historic Places
- U.S. Historic district
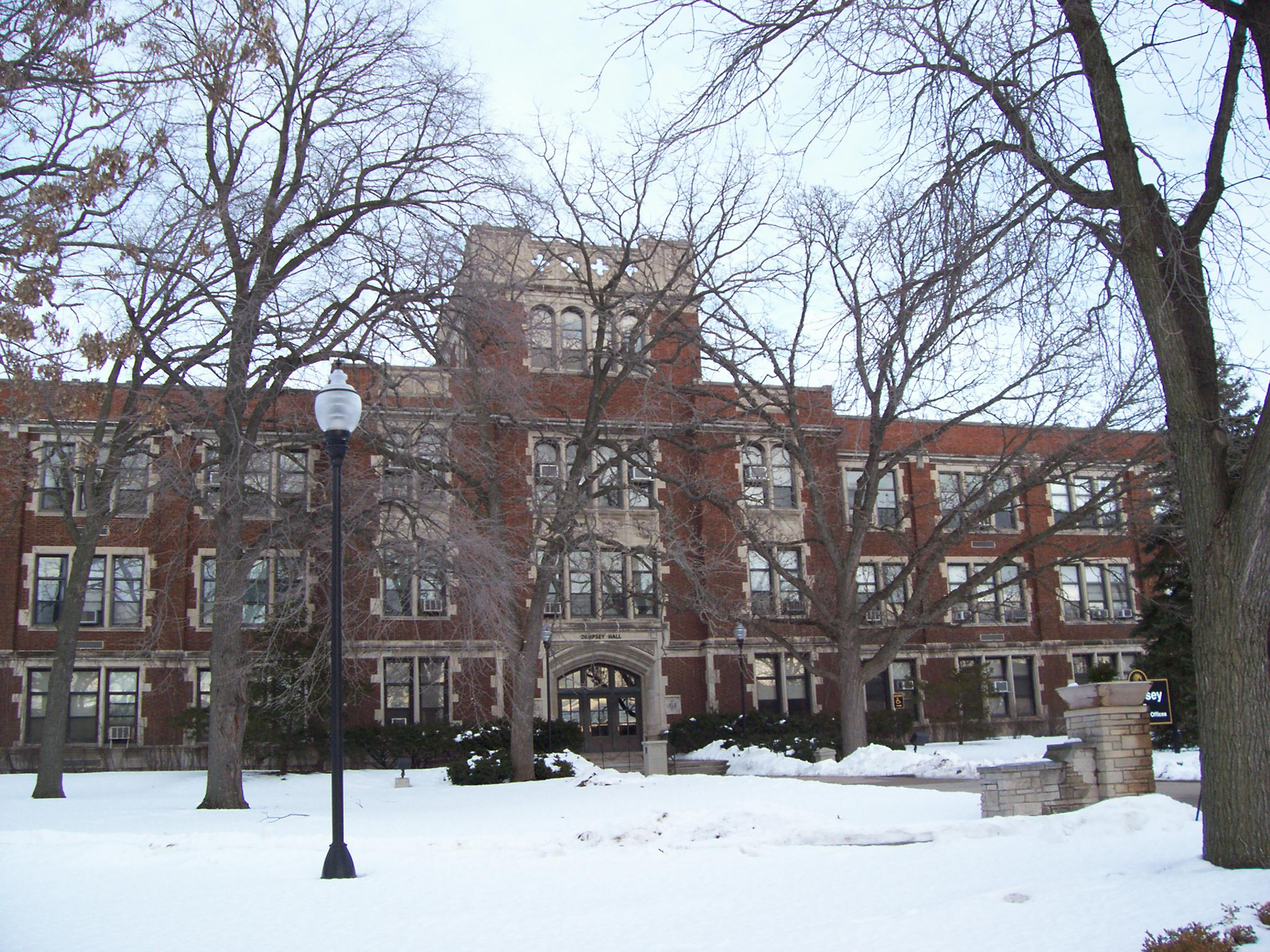
- Dempsey Hall

- Location within Wisconsin Location within the United States
- Location: Buildings at 800, 842, and 912 Algoma Blvd., and 845 Elmwood Ave., Oshkosh, Wisconsin
- Area: 9 acres (3.6 ha)
- Built: 1934
- Architects: Van Ryn & DeGelleke
- Architectural style: Gothic, Collegiate Gothic
- NRHP reference No.: 84000722
- Added to NRHP: December 6, 1984

=== Oshkosh State Normal School Historic District ===
Three buildings on the original campus comprise this historic district. Dempsey Hall serves as the administration center of the campus. Harrington Hall hosts geology classes. Swart Hall, completed in 1928, is used by the mathematics, social work, and sociology departments and houses the Center for Economic Education. It was originally used as a lab school where student teachers taught kindergarten through ninth grade students.

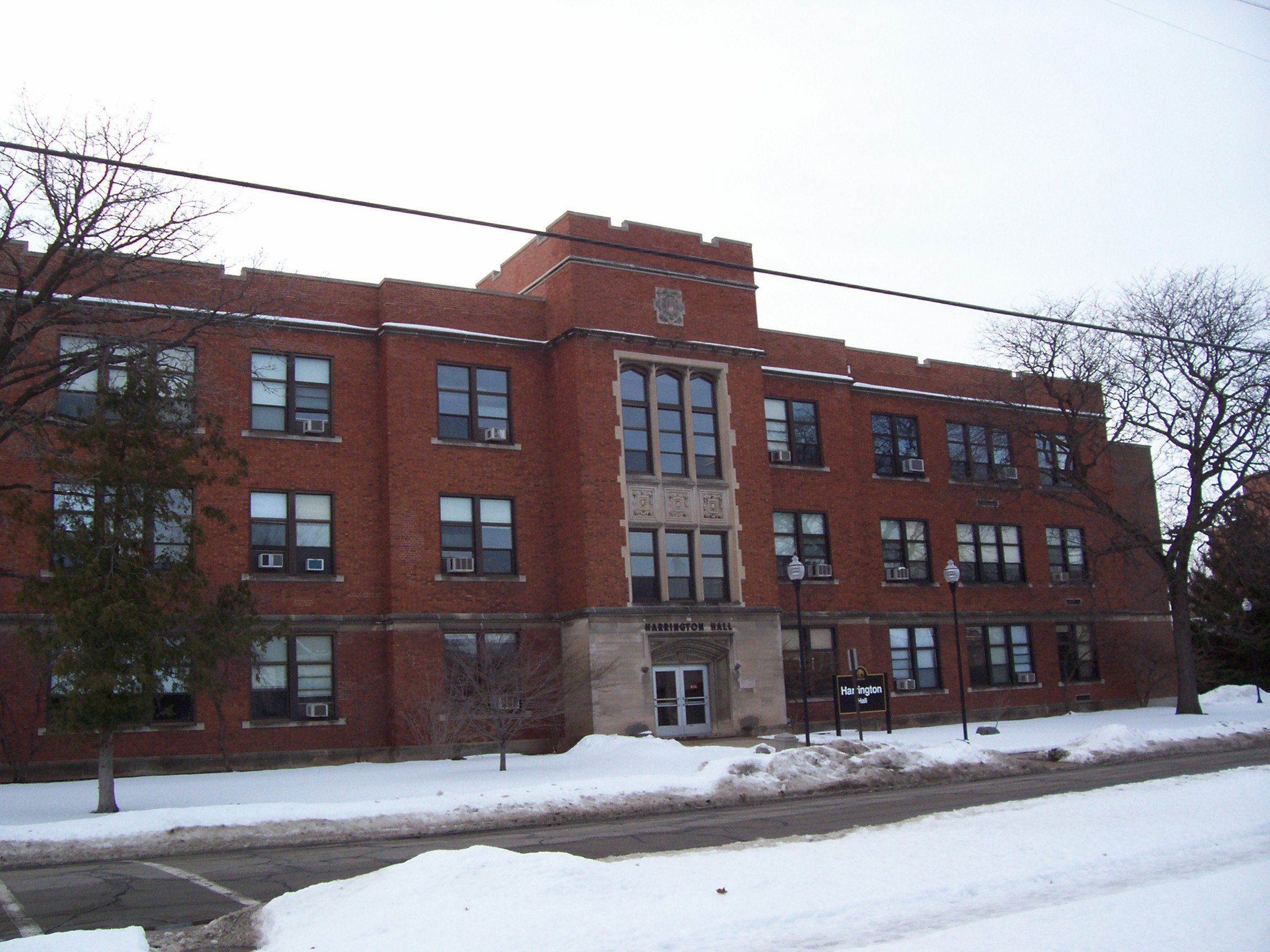
Harrington Hall

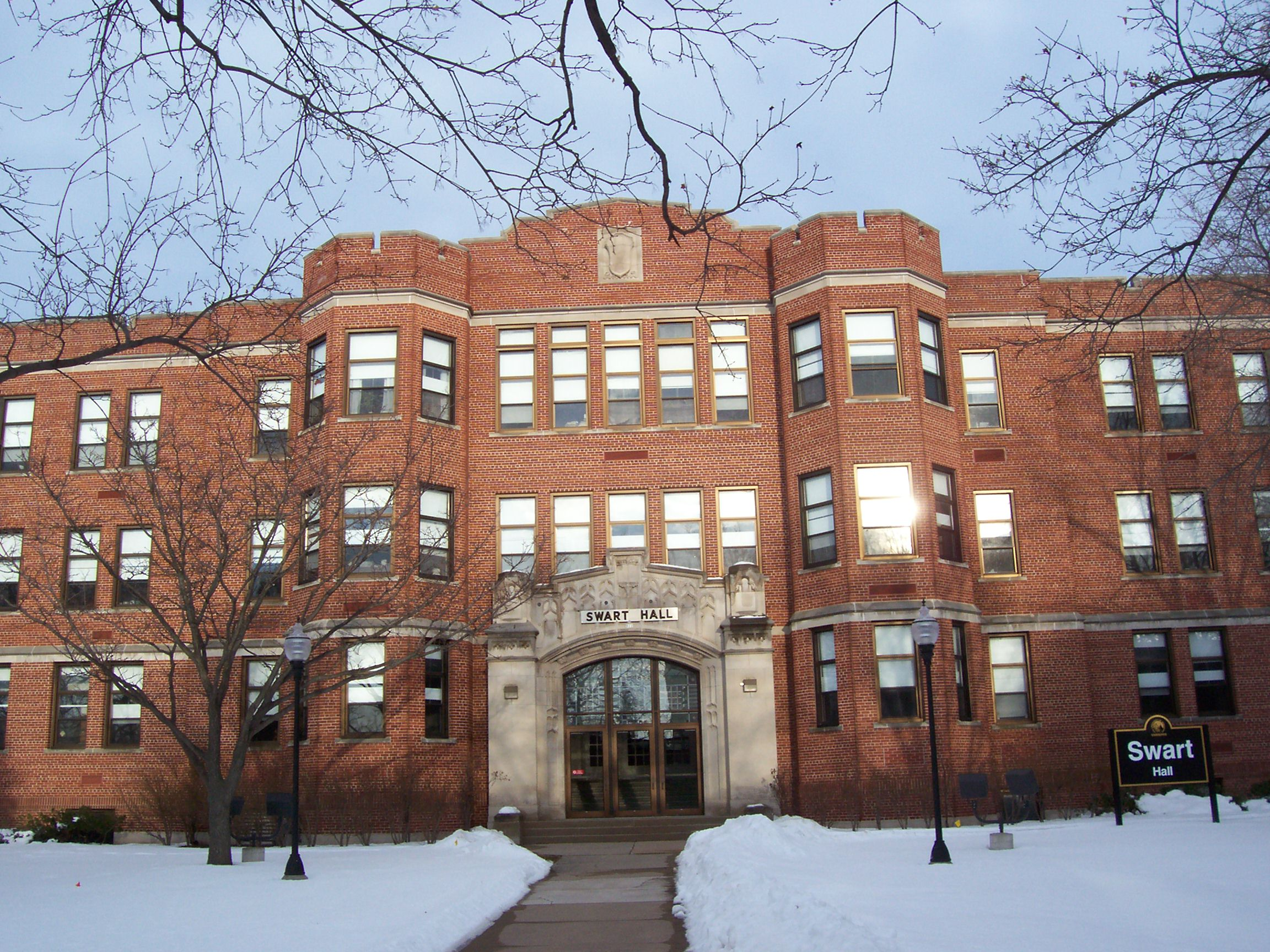
Swart Hall

- Oviatt House
- U.S. National Register of Historic Places
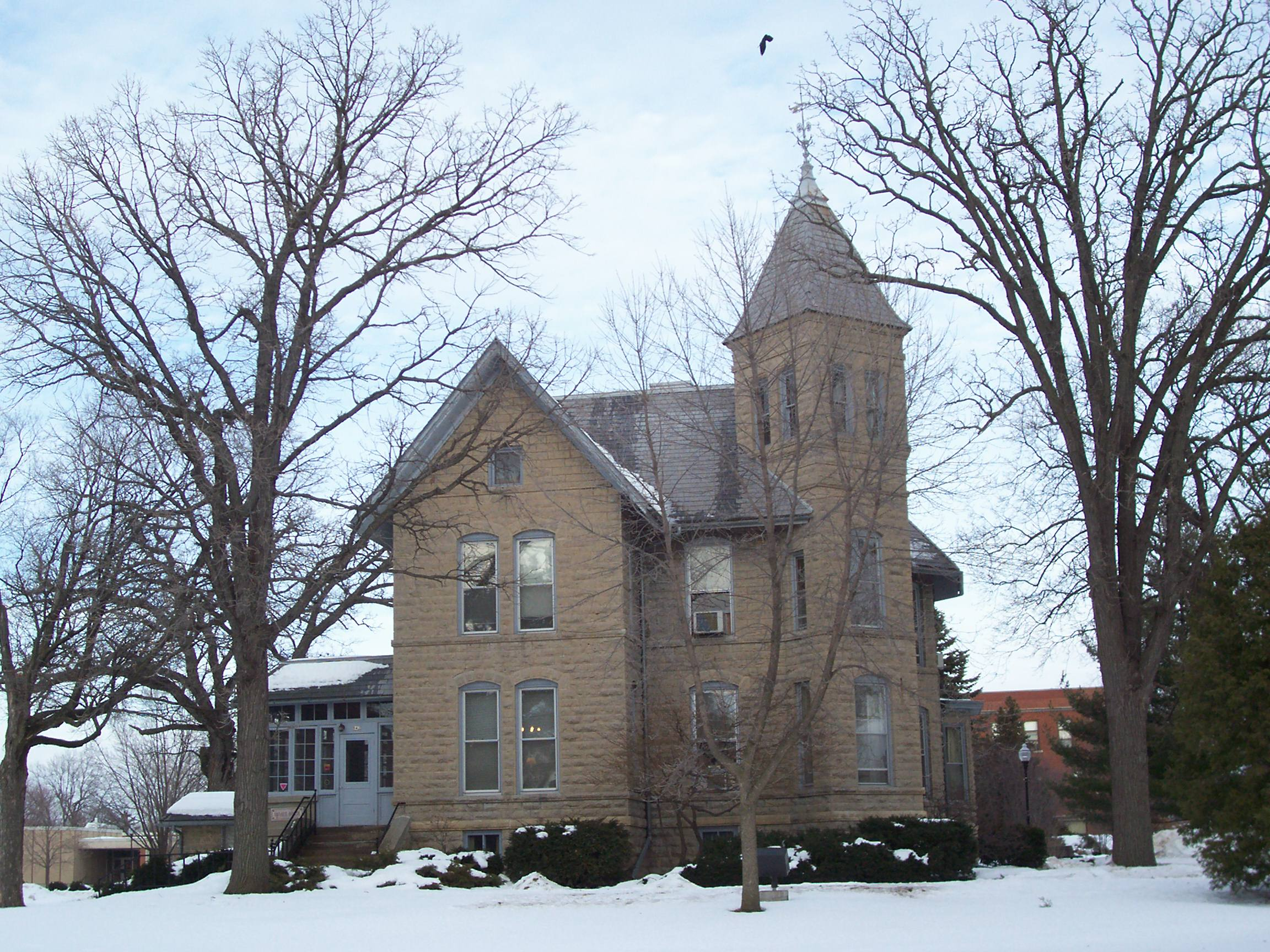
- Oviatt House
- Location: 842 Algoma Blvd., Oshkosh, Wisconsin
- Area: 1.2 acres (0.49 ha)
- Built: 1883
- Architect: William Waters
- Architectural style: Late Victorian
- NRHP reference No.: 79000121
- Added to NRHP: August 27, 1979

=== Oviatt House ===
Moses Hooper moved to Oshkosh in 1863 and started construction of the house in 1882. It was located at the north edge of the Wisconsin State Normal School at Oshkosh. It cost approximately $20,000 to build. Hooper moved into his new residence on October 31, 1883. The structure had modern amenities including hot water, heat, and running water. The interior was painted by local painters Frank Waldo and Gustav Behncke. The house was sold on September 20, 1900, to Dr. Charles W. Oviatt, a surgeon who paid $18,000 for the property. After Oviatt's death in 1912, his heirs sold the house and grounds to the State Normal School Regents in 1913 with the agreement that the heirs could live in the house until June 1914.

The house was first used by the school as a women's dormitory, the first on campus. Because the dormitory operated at a loss, school president Polk discontinued the venture in 1932. After considering dismantling the building, Polk started renting the house from the school in 1934. The following three presidents of the school also resided in the house, ending with President Penson in 1989. The University of Wisconsin Oshkosh Foundation moved its office in the house the following year.

The Oviatt House was placed on the National Register of Historic Places in 1979.

Currently the Oviatt House is head for the Honors College.

- William E. Pollock Residence
- U.S. National Register of Historic Places
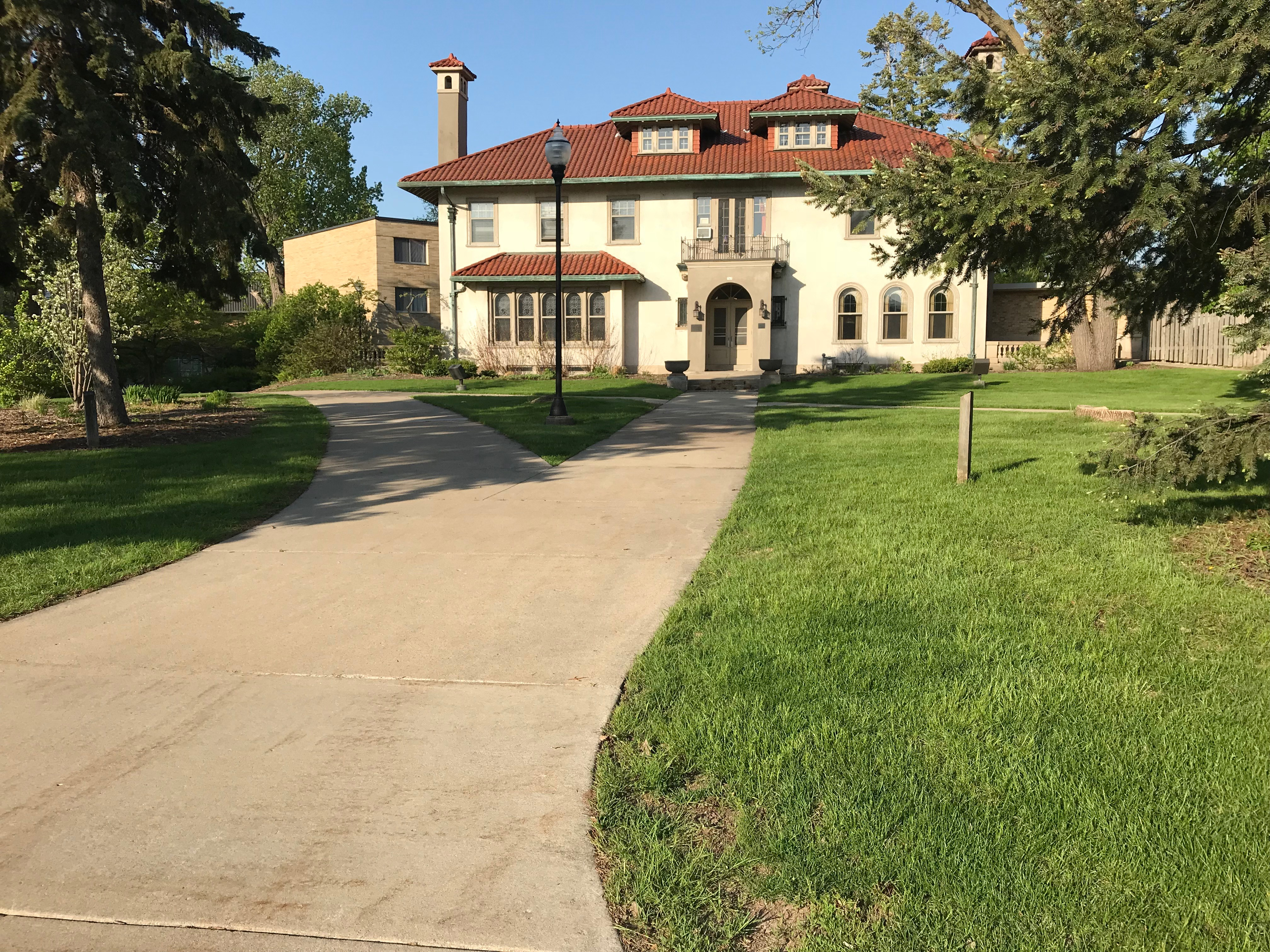
- Pollock Alumni House
- Location: 765 Algoma Blvd., Oshkosh, Wisconsin
- Area: less than one acre
- Built: 1920
- Architectural style: Mission/Spanish Revival, Spanish-Mediterranean
- NRHP reference No.: 84000728
- Added to NRHP: December 6, 1984

=== Thomas R. Wall Residence ===
The Thomas R. Wall Residence is a Colonial Revival-style house located on campus. It was added to the National Register of Historic Places on November 7, 1984. The Thomas R. Wall Residence was built between 1898 and 1900 by the prominent local architect William Waters. In 1947, the residence was purchased by the university and has been used in various functions. It is currently used as the Multi-Cultural Education Center, which it has done so since 1972.

=== William E. Pollock Residence ===
William E. Pollock managed OshKosh B'Gosh. He had Fluor Brothers construction company build the house in 1920 for $19,000. The yard included a three-car garage, garden, and fishing pond. Pollock lived in the house from 1920 until 1937. He sold the house on a land contract, but the house was returned to him after the contract was unfulfilled. Pollock then donated the house to the Oshkosh State Teachers College in 1943.

The college turned the residence into a women's dormitory which could house up to 32 students. In the 1960s it was used as an honors dormitory until closing in 1967. From 1967 until 1970 it housed the College of Nursing offices. When the College of Nursing was relocated to a new building, the structure was taken over by the Alumni Association, who have occupied it since 1970. It is occasionally used for special functions. Notable visitors have included President Jimmy Carter, United Nations ambassador Jeane Kirkpatrick, and Edward Albee.

The house is designed as a Mediterranean Revival style house with Italian and Spanish motif. The entrance has an ornate semi-circular wrought iron door leading into a large foyer. The front entry hall opens into a large living room and a smaller parlor. A formal staircase rises to an open landing and to a study. The second story bedrooms are used as offices for Alumni and Foundation staff. The rear consists of a formal dining room, kitchen, and pantry. The building has three chimneys capped with campaniles that resemble Italian bell towers. The residence's exterior is framed by concrete planters and topped by a wrought iron balcony outside of the second-story French windows. The roof is low-pitched red-barrel tile.

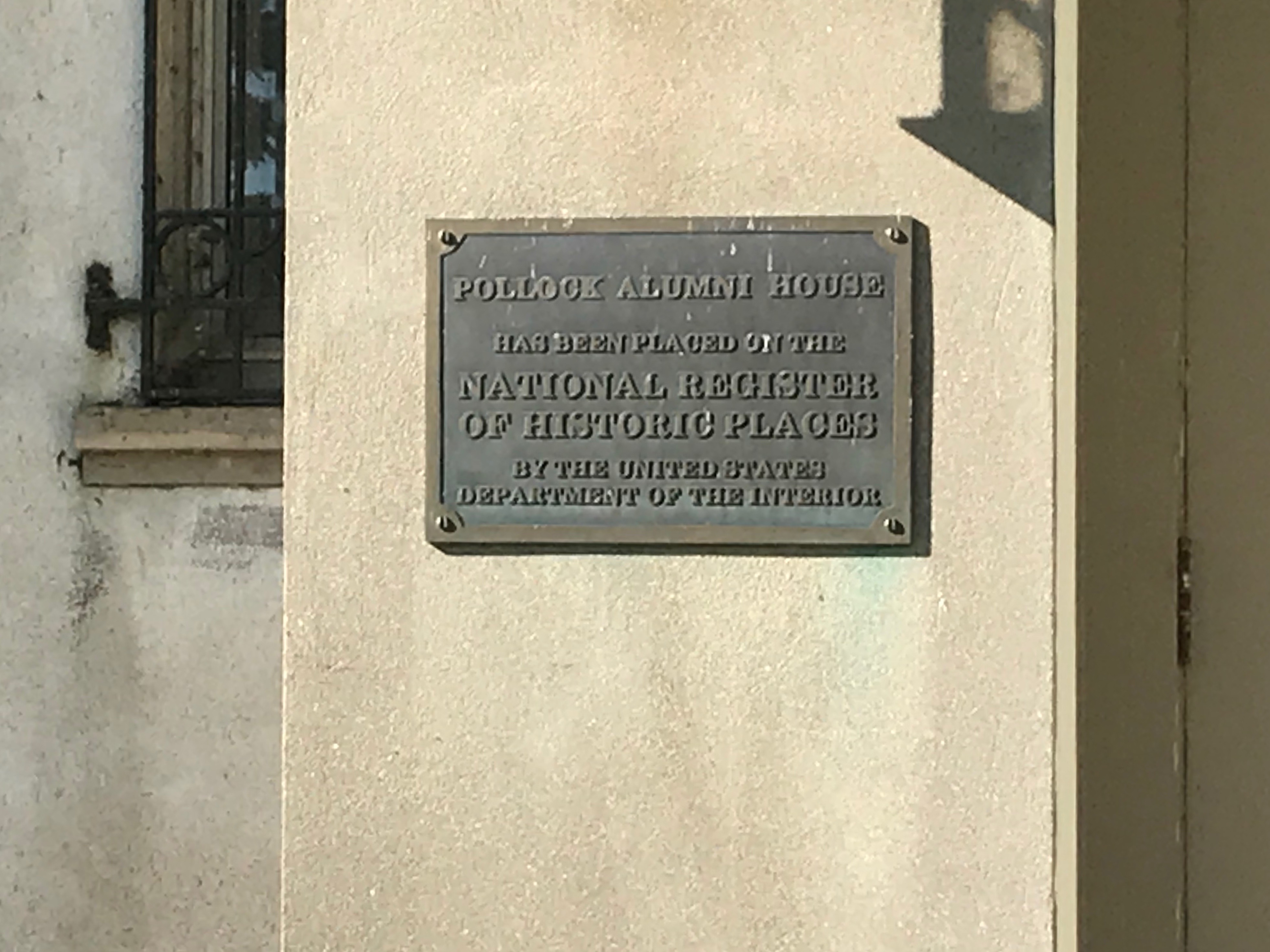
Sign on the Exterior of the William E. Pollock Residence

== Student life ==
=== Greek life ===
Fraternities and sororities (as of Spring 2023)

Fraternities

- Alpha Phi Alpha - chapter founded in 1971, chapter recharted 2022
- Beta Theta Pi - chapter founded 1991
- Delta Sigma Phi - chapter founded 1965
- Omega Delta Phi - chapter founded 2006, inactive Fall 2024
- Sigma Pi - chapter founded 1985

Sororities

- Alpha Xi Delta - chapter founded 1965, re-founded 1986
- Gamma Alpha Omega - chapter founded 1999, re-chartered 2022
- Gamma Phi Beta - chapter founded 1966, re-founded 1980
- Zeta Tau Alpha - chapter founded 1997
- Sigma Sigma Sigma - chapter founded 1987

Among campus dormant chapters, Phi Sigma Kappa was present since 1925, first as the Periclean Club, which in 1965 renamed itself as a chapter of Phi Sigma Epsilon, closing with most other groups in the late 1970s. Its national merged with the larger and older Phi Sigma Kappa in 1985, and its alumni remain active today. Phi Beta Sigma was founded in 1984 but is currently inactive. Delta Chi became dormant in December 2022.

From this downturn, fraternities and sororities began to re-emerge in the mid-1980s, according to the Fraternity & Sorority Life office.

=== Media ===
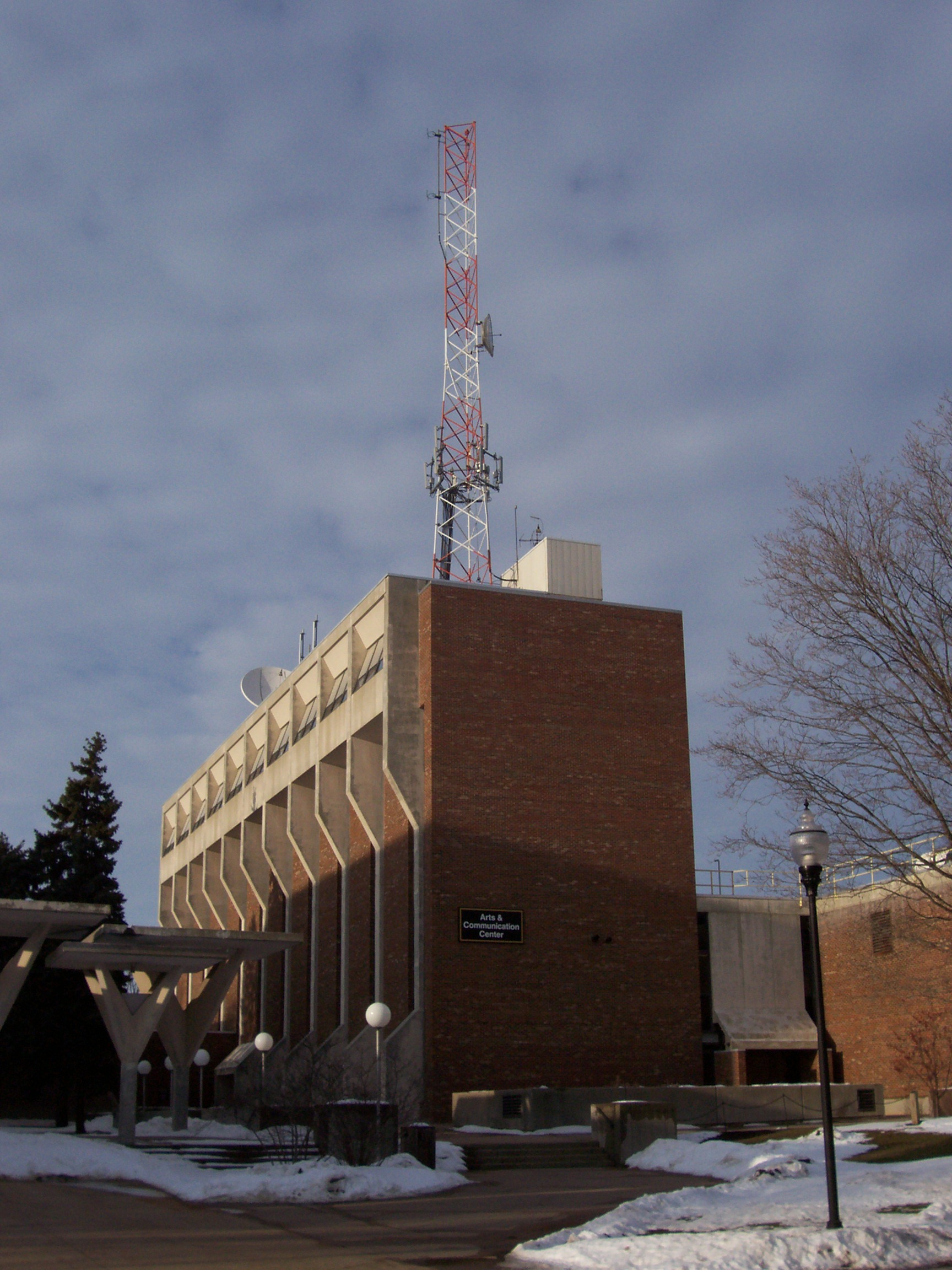
Arts & Communications building

The school's newspaper is the Advance-Titan, a weekly publication produced by students. It was founded in 1894 by students and faculty.

The school's radio station, WRST-FM 90.3, is located in the Arts & Communications building. The call letters stand for "Radio Station of the Titans". The station carries Wisconsin Public Radio and student programming.

Robert "Doc" Snyder founded the Radio-TV-Film program in 1964, with the aim of motivating students by fostering considerate and responsible communication. The department offers a comprehensive media curriculum that includes critical media analysis and extensive practical experience. Additionally, the program provides various extracurricular organizations such as Film Society and the International Film Series.

The Radio-TV-Film program broadened its reach across the nation by introducing Titan TV in 1974, a national satellite station that featured a complete lineup of student-produced programming.

== Athletics ==
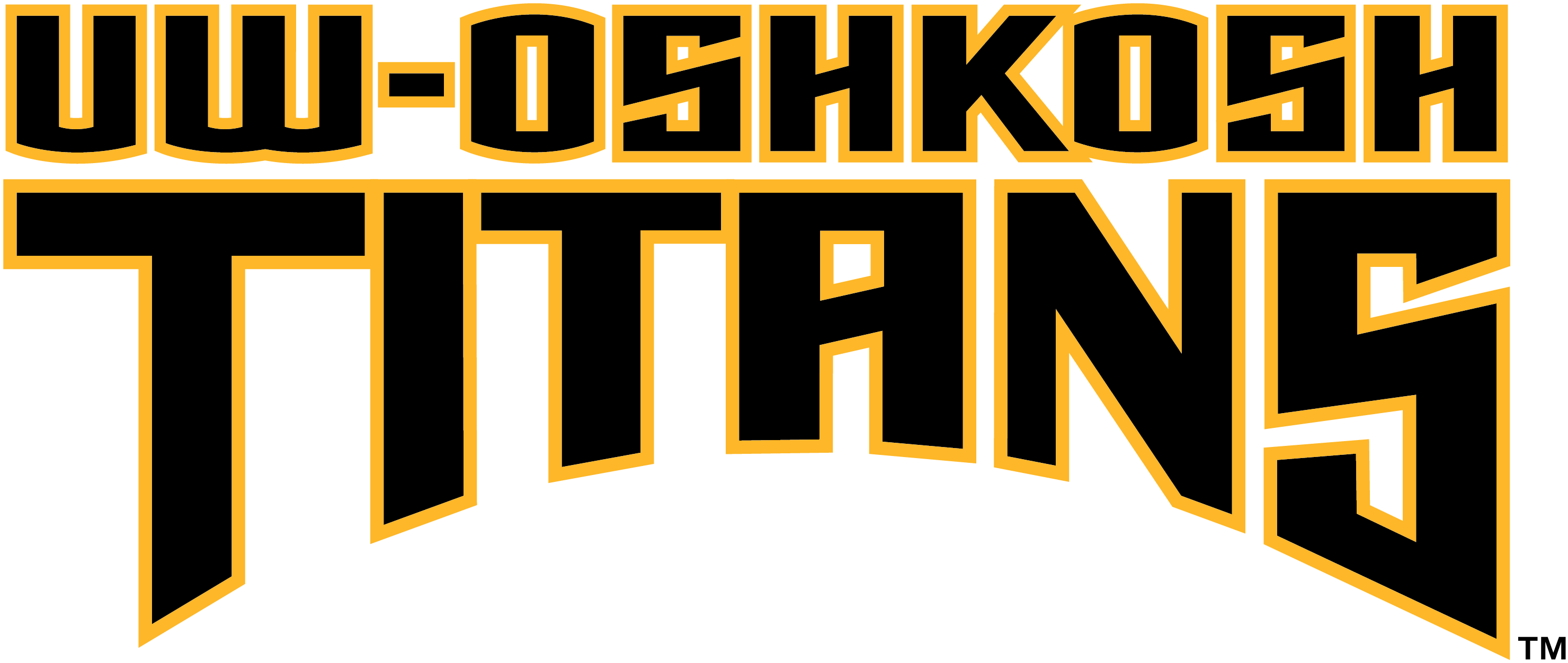
Athletics wordmark

The main on-campus sports facility is Kolf Sports Center, which contains facilities for basketball, gymnastics, indoor track & field, volleyball, and wrestling. Other events held there include commencement ceremonies, concerts, and regional conventions. Albee Hall & Pool hosts swimming & diving events. Titan Stadium (football/soccer/outdoor track), Tiedemann Field at Alumni Stadium (baseball), and the Mary Beth Nienhaus Softball Complex, all of which make up the Oshkosh Sports Complex, are located across the Fox River, 1.3 miles from campus.

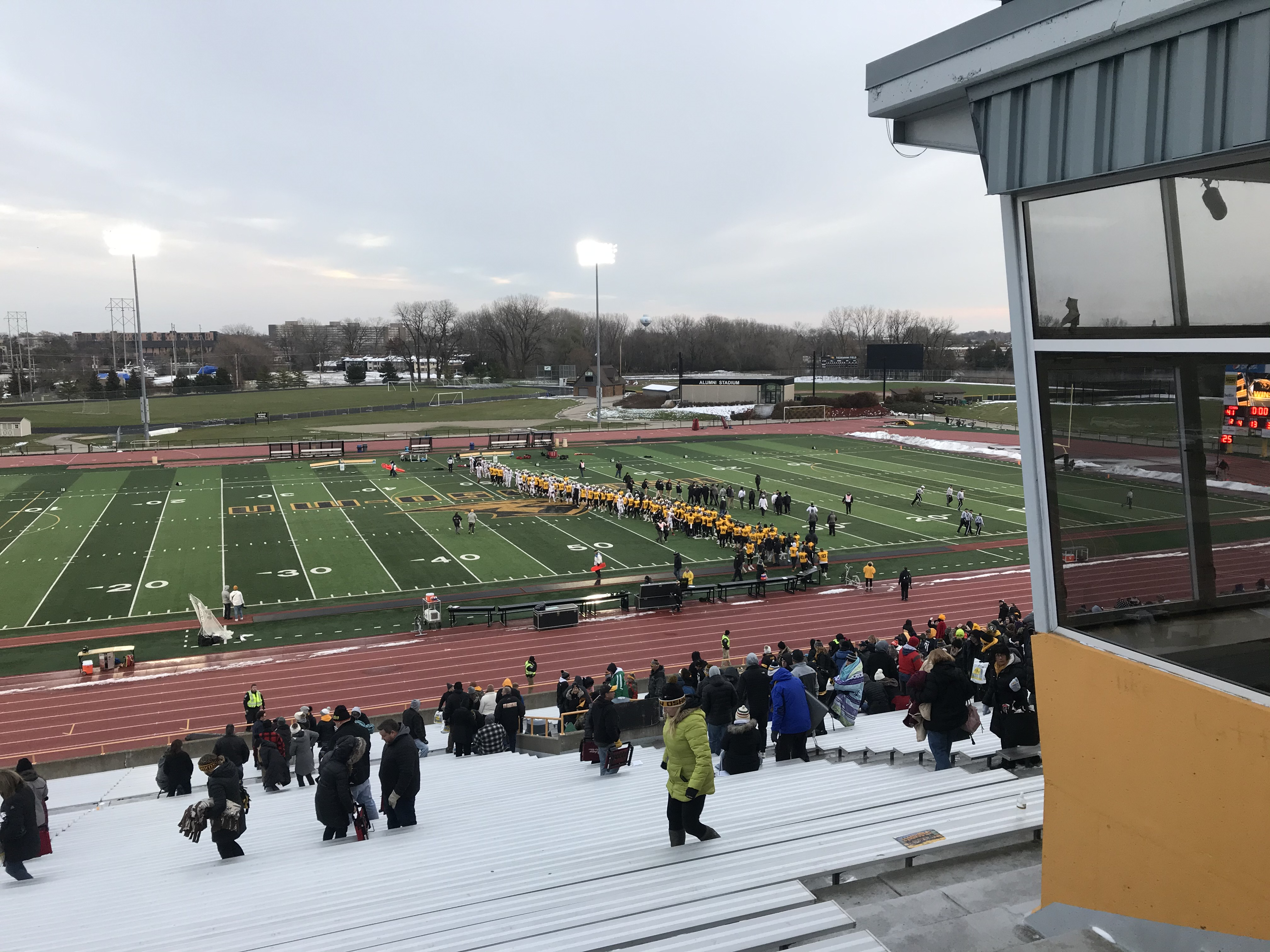
Titan Stadium

The baseball program appeared in 5 Division III championship games between 1985 and 1994. There have been eight Titans players to play in Major League Baseball: Jim Magnuson, Dan Neumeier, Jim Gantner, Dorian "Doe" Boyland, Gary Varsho, Terry Jorgensen, Jarrod Washburn, and Jack Taschner.

In 2012, the Wisconsin–Oshkosh Titans football team advanced to the NCAA Division III Semifinals before falling to St. Thomas in St. Paul, Minnesota. The Titans finished with a 13-1 (7-0 WIAC) record and ranked as the #4 team by d3football.com. In 2015, the Titans were again undefeated in the WIAC regular season and advanced to the NCAA Division III Quarterfinals before losing to WIAC rival UW-Whitewater. The Titans were 2016 national runners-up, losing to the University of Mary Hardin–Baylor in the Amos Alonzo Stagg Bowl, the NCAA Division III Championship game. In 2017 the Titans were again undefeated and were the #1-seeded team in the Division III NCAA tournament. They were defeated in the semifinal game in Oshkosh by eventual national champion, the University of Mount Union.

The men's basketball program was in the NAIA Men's Basketball Championships in 1960, 1963, 1967, and 1968; and the NCAA Division III men's basketball tournaments in 1996–1998, and 2002–2003. In 2019, the men's team won the Division III National Championship. The women's basketball program played in the NCAA Division III Women's Basketball Championship every year from 1990 to 1992, and again from 1994 to 2000. In 1995, they reached the Final Four, and the following year (1996), won the national championship.

The women's gymnastics program won the AIAW Championship for Division III in 1980, the NAIA national women's gymnastics championship in 1986, and National Collegiate Gymnastics Association championships in 1989, 2007, 2022, 2023, 2024, and 2026. The men's gymnastics program won NAIA gymnastics championships under Titans Hall of Fame coach Ken Allen in 1973, 1974, and then 5 straight years from 1978 to 1982. In addition, they won the NCAA Men's Gymnastics championship in Division II in 1980, 1981, and 1982, before the two divisions were merged in 1984.

The women's track and field team has won the Division III outdoor championship in 1990, 1991, 1995, 1996, 2004, 2006, 2007, and 2011. They won the Division III indoor championship in 1994, 1996, 2004, 2005, 2006, 2011, and 2013. The Titans finished as runners-up in the 1989, 1992, 1999, 2005, 2009, 2010 and 2012 at the Division III outdoor championships, and finished as runners-up in the 1990, 1991, 1992, 2002, 2010 and 2012 at the Division III indoor championships. The women's cross-country team won the NCAA Division III Championship in 1987, 1988, 1991, and 1996, and were runners-up in 1989, 1990, and 1995.

The men's track and field team won both the Division III Indoor and Outdoor Championships in 2009 and were runners-up in the NCAA Division III Indoor Track and Field meet in 1999, 2001, 2003, 2013, and 2025. The Titans finished as the runners-up at the 2024 national meet. The men's cross-country team won the NCAA Division III Championship in 1988, 1989, 1990, and 2002.

The softball program went to the World Series in 1988. They also made NCAA tournament appearances in 2007 and 2008 coming up one game short of the World Series after losing the regional championship game to conference rival Wisconsin-Eau Claire. The Titans returned to the NCAA tournament in 2017, losing to Trine University in the NCAA Division III Super Regional round. In 2021 and 2024, Oshkosh returned to the World Series. The 2021 super regional was cancelled due to the coronavirus pandemic and the Titans defeated Trine in the 2024 super regional round.

Between 2003 and 2026, the men's club volleyball team finished in the top five every year except 2008 at the National Intramural Recreational Sports Association (NIRSA) championships. In 2005, the team finished second, and first in 2006, 2007 and 2011. The small Division 3 team won back-to-back to back NCVF Division 1 men's club volleyball national championships in 2014, 2015 and 2016.

== Notable alumni and faculty ==
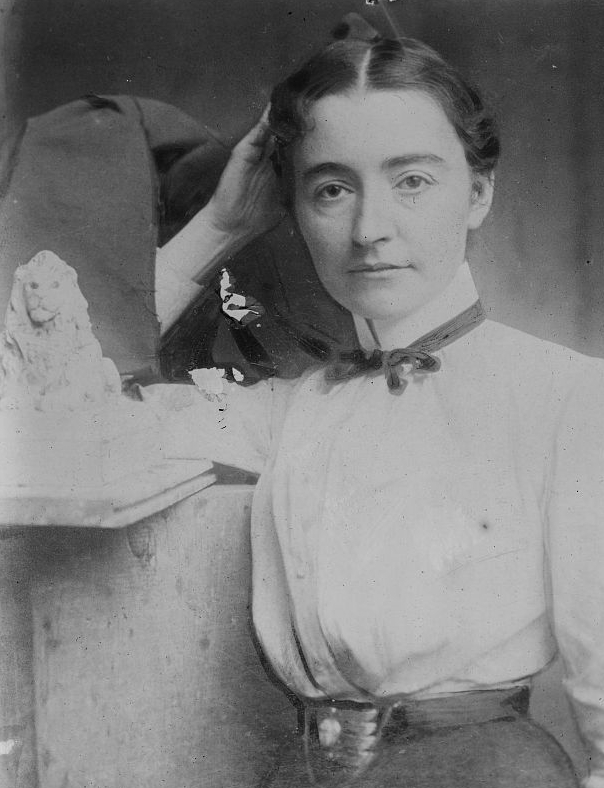
Helen Farnsworth Mears, American sculptor

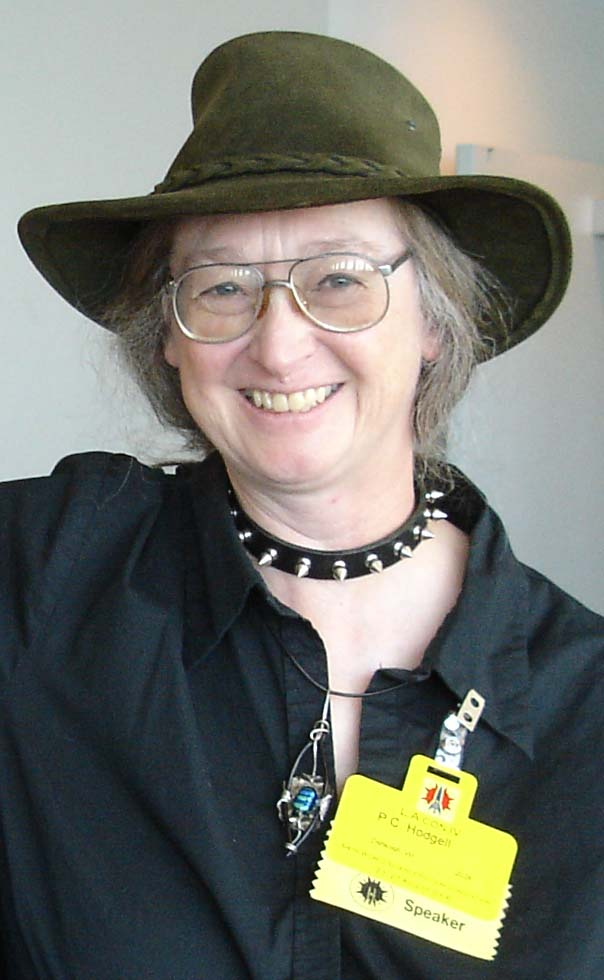
P. C. Hodgell, fantasy writer, artist and UW Oshkosh lecturer

== See also ==
- Board of Regents of State Colleges v. Roth
