= Kolf Sports Center =

Multi-purpose area in Oshkosh, Wisconsin

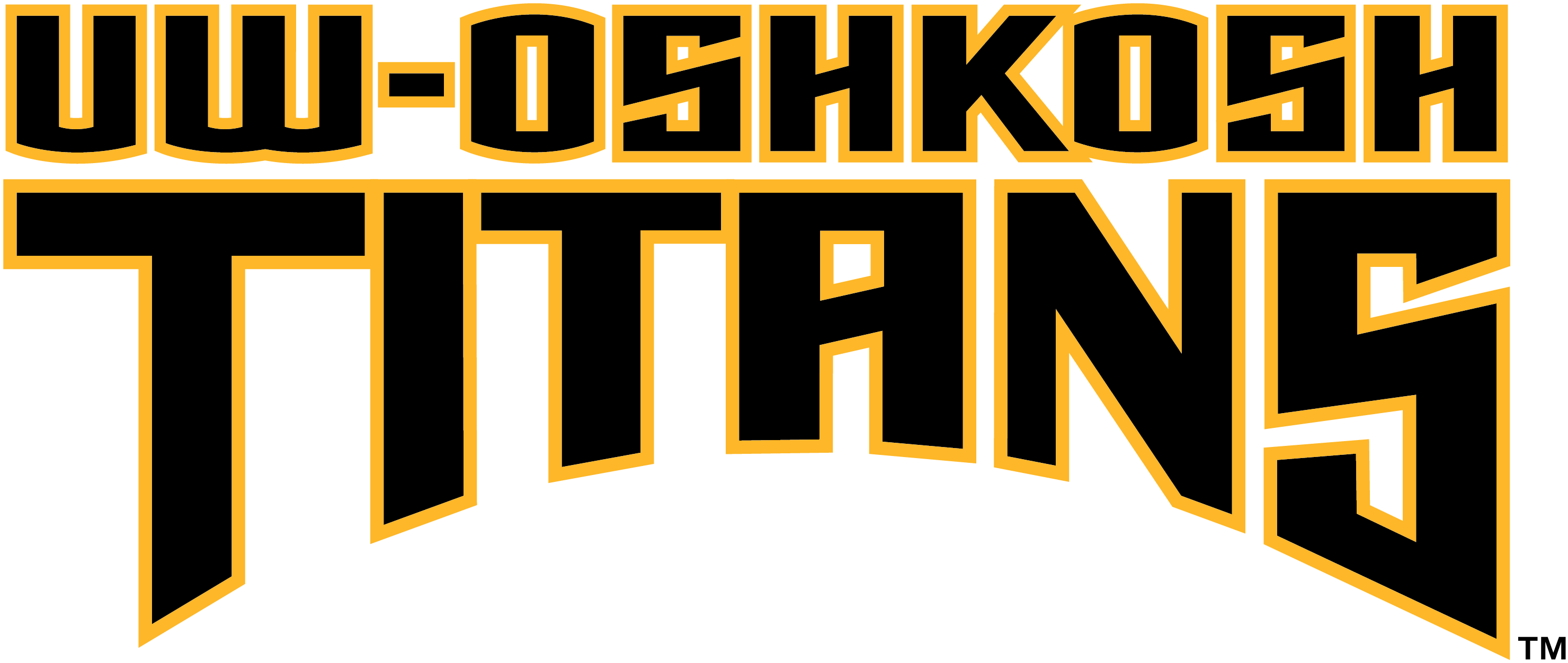

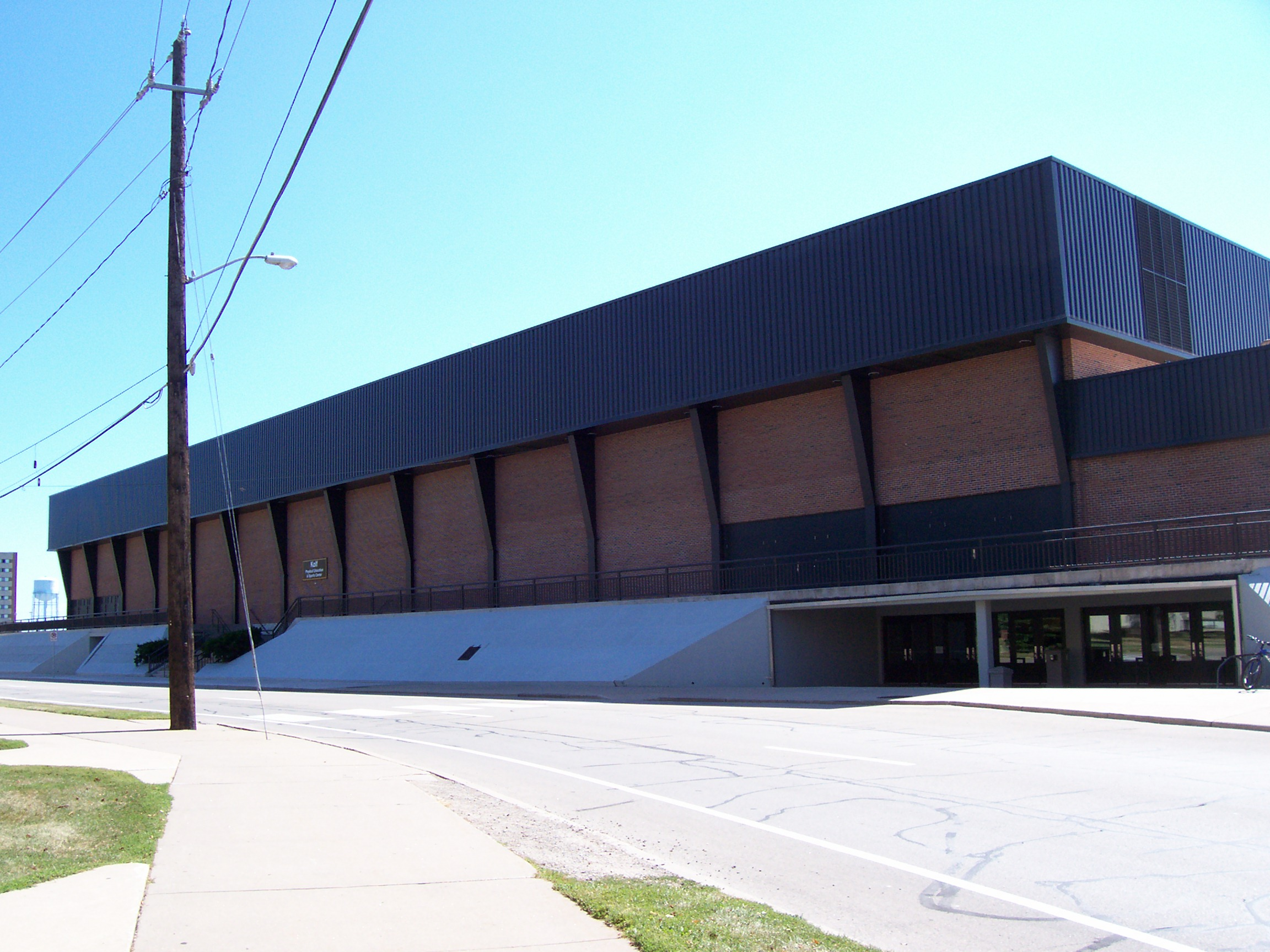
- Exterior view of the arena
- Interactive map of Kolf Sports Center
- Address: 785 High Avenue; Oshkosh, Wisconsin; United States
- Location: 785 High Avenue, Oshkosh, Wisconsin
- Coordinates: 44.024186°N 88.552101°W
- Owner: UW–Oshkosh
- Operator: UW–Oshkosh Athletics
- Capacity: 5,600 (basketball/volleyball); 1,000 (indoor track)
- Type: Arena
- Current use: Basketball; Volleyball; Gymnastics; Indoor track and field Wrestling

Construction
- Opened: 1971; 55 years ago
- Renovated: 1993; September 20, 2012
- Cost: $1.4 million (2012 renovation)

Tenants
- Wisconsin–Oshkosh Titans (NCAA) teams: basketball, volleyball, gymnastics, track and field (indoor), wrestling

Website
- uwoshkoshtitans.com/kolf-sports-center

The Kolf Sports Center is a 5,800-seat multi-purpose arena at the University of Wisconsin–Oshkosh in Oshkosh, Wisconsin. It was named for Robert Kolf, the university's head track coach from 1931 to 1959.

The arena is home to the Wisconsin–Oshkosh Titans basketball, volleyball, gymnastics, track and field (indoor), and wrestling teams.

== History ==
Kolf Sports center was considered to be a state-of-the-art facility when it was built in 1971. It contains a one eighth of a mile all-weather indoor track on the second floor. The track hosted the 1994, 1997 and 2001 NCAA Division III Indoor National Championship meets.

== Uses ==
=== Athletics ===
The UW-Oshkosh Titans track and field teams practice in the indoor track. The track hosts the annual Oshkosh High School Invitational, which is attended by a large number of Wisconsin high school track teams.

The basketball court is the home of the University of Wisconsin–Oshkosh Titans men's and women's basketball teams.

The university also uses the facility for wrestling and gymnastics.

The university holds physical education classes at Kolf. The offices of the physical education department, the university's athletic director, athletic coaches, and the Military Science Department are located at Kolf.

=== Professional wrestling ===
Numerous professional wrestling house shows have been held at the Kolf Center. Apart from a television taping in 1986, the American Wrestling Association held house shows there between 1986 and 1988. WWE/WWF held house shows between 1992 and 2009.

=== Commencement ===
Kolf is used for the spring commencement ceremony for Fox Valley Technical College.

=== Concert venue ===
Kolf has been used for concerts since the early 1970s. Artists such as Wishbone Ash, The Cars, Goo Goo Dolls, Everclear, Jason Mraz, Michelle Branch, Bob Dylan, Lifehouse, Simple Plan, Sugar Ray and comedian Dave Chappelle have performed there.

=== Political rallies ===
On February 15, 2008, Democratic presidential candidate Barack Obama made a campaign speech at Kolf.
