= Charles T. Beardsley Jr. =

American architect (1861–1937)

- Born: 1861; Derby, Connecticut
- Died: 1937 (aged 75–76); Bridgeport, Connecticut
- Occupation: Architect
- Buildings: Willimantic State Normal School; Plumb Memorial Library; Wakeman Memorial Building

Charles T. Beardsley Jr. (1861–1937) was an American architect practicing in Bridgeport, Connecticut.

Beardsley was born in Derby, Connecticut in 1861. At the age of 15 he went to New Haven, where he took a position in the office of Henry Austin. After nearly a decade had gone by, Beardsley relocated to Bridgeport in 1885, where he established his own office. He initially became noted as a designer of private residences, though in the 1890s he added the design of schools to his repertoire.

During the first 15 years or so of his professional career, Beardsley preferred the Queen Anne, Richardsonian Romanesque, and Shingle Styles. In later years, he adapted to the Colonial and Tudor revivals.

At least one of Beardsley's works is listed independently on the National Register of Historic Places, and many others are contributing resources to listed historic districts.

== Architectural work ==
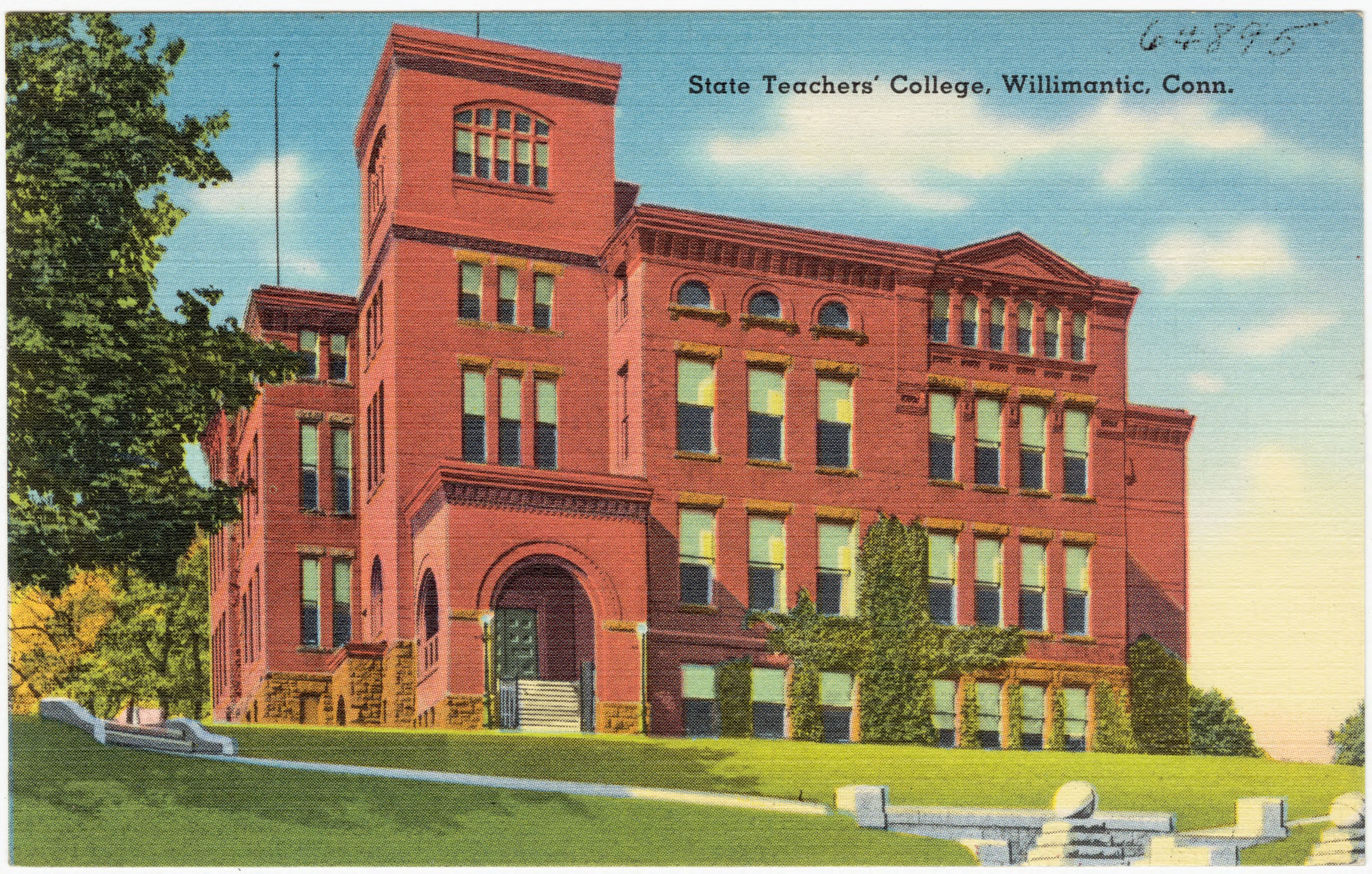
Normal School, Willimantic, 1892.

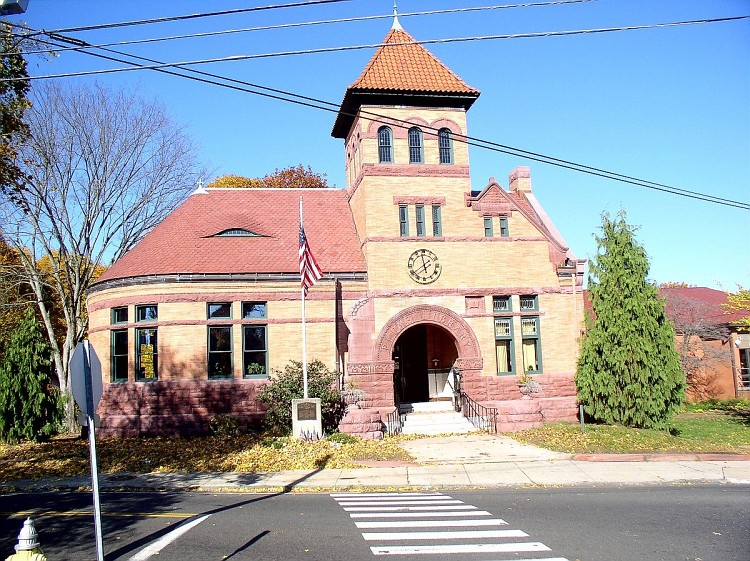
Plumb Memorial Library, Shelton, 1894.

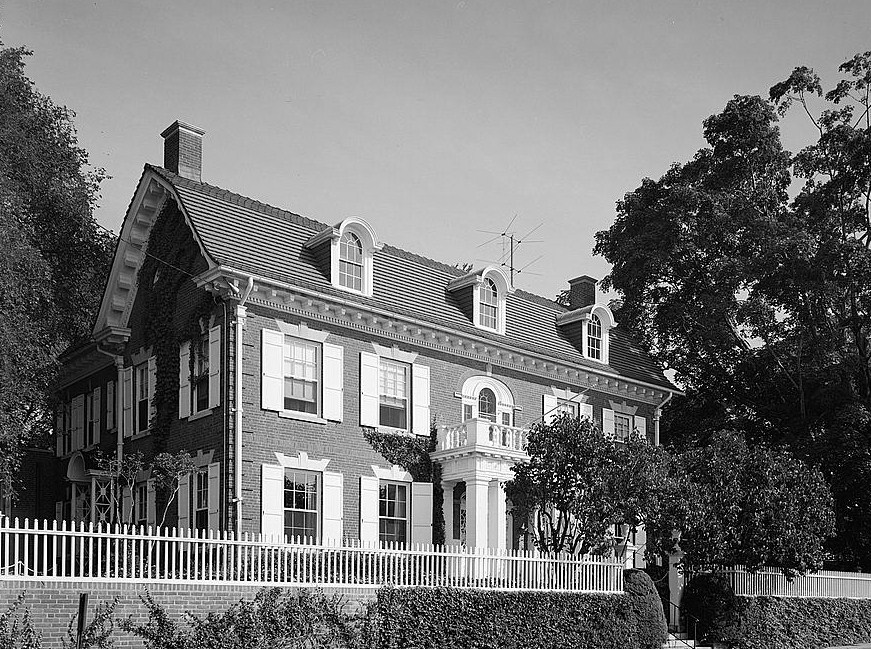
Wakeman Memorial, Southport, 1912.

- 1886 – Eli Dewhurst House, 409 Noble Ave, Bridgeport, Connecticut
- 1887 – Frederick J. Lockwood Duplex, 234–236 West Ave, Bridgeport, Connecticut
- 1888 – James A. McAvoy Duplex, 63 Maple Ave, Willimantic, Connecticut
- 1888 – Isabelle Nash House, 586 Clinton Ave, Bridgeport, Connecticut
- 1889 – Arthur R. Carpenter House, 156 Prospect St, Willimantic, Connecticut
- 1890 – Edwin J. Nettleton Houses, 77–93 William St, Bridgeport, Connecticut
- 1890 – Edwin J. Nettleton Houses, 311-321 E Washington Ave, Bridgeport, Connecticut
- 1891 – Frank M. Wilson House, 196 Church St, Willimantic, Connecticut
- 1892 – Willimantic State Normal School, Valley St, Willimantic, Connecticut
  - Not completed until 1895. Burned in 1943.
- 1893 – Mrs. Frederick J. Lockwood House, 298 Prospect St, Bridgeport, Connecticut
- 1894 – Masonic Building, 1007 Broad St, Bridgeport, Connecticut
  - Demolished.
- 1894 – Plumb Memorial Library, 65 Wooster St, Shelton, Connecticut
- 1896 – William H. Siebs House, 158 Brooklawn Ave, Bridgeport, Connecticut
- 1899 – Albert H. Canfield House, 116 Elmwood Pl, Bridgeport, Connecticut
- 1900 – Hamilton S. Shelton House, 1464 Fairfield Ave, Bridgeport, Connecticut
  - Demolished.
- 1905 – Newfield School, 405 Newfield Ave, Bridgeport, Connecticut
- 1909 – Jesse B. Cornwall House, 625 Clinton Ave, Bridgeport, Connecticut
- 1910 – Garfield School, 655 Stillman St, Bridgeport, Connecticut
- 1911 – Bryant School, 230 Poplar St, Bridgeport, Connecticut
- 1911 – Lafayette School, 54 Grove St, Shelton, Connecticut
- 1912 – Wakeman Memorial Building, 648 Harbor Rd, Southport, Connecticut
