= Gateway Village Historic District =

- U.S. National Register of Historic Places
- U.S. Historic district
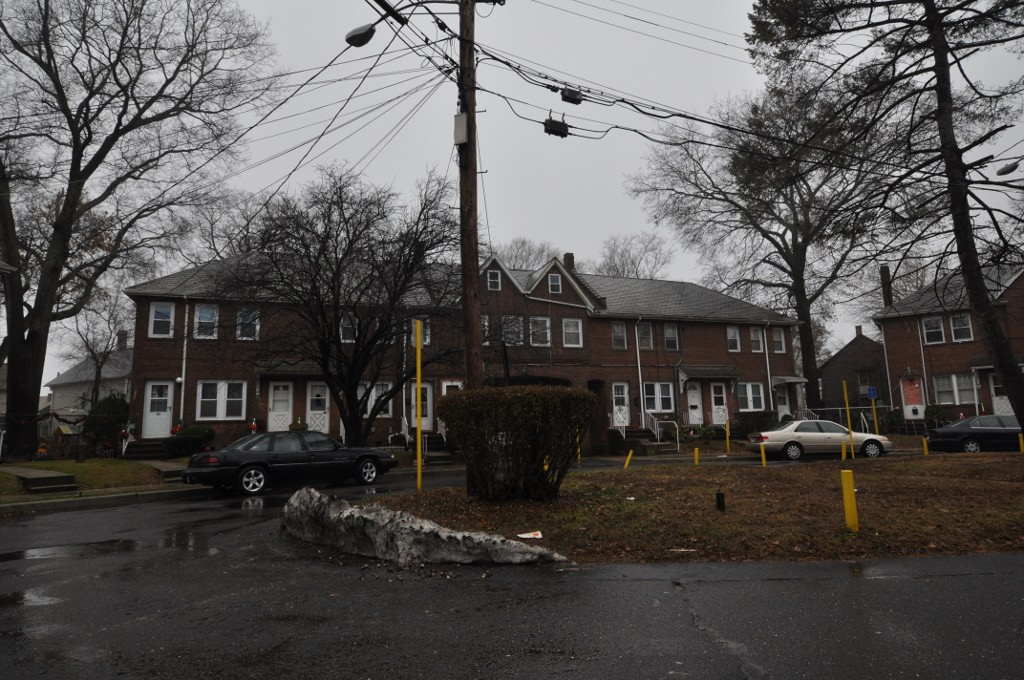
- The central courtyard area on Alanson Road

- Location within Connecticut Location within the United States
- Location: Roughly bounded by Waterman Street, Connecticut Avenue and Alanson Avenue, Bridgeport, Connecticut
- Coordinates: 41°09′27″N 73°13′30″W
- Area: 8.9 acres (3.6 ha)
- Architect: Mead & Schenck
- Architectural style: Tudor Revival
- MPS: Wartime Emergency Housing in Bridgeport MPS
- NRHP reference No.: 90001429
- Added to NRHP: September 26, 1990

The Gateway Village Historic District encompasses a World War I-era housing project on the east side of Bridgeport, Connecticut. Centered on Alanson Road, the project was developed in the later years of the war to provide emergency housing for workers in the city's munitions factories. It is a rare design attributed to the female-led architectural firm Mead & Schenk, led by Marcia Mead and Anna P. Schenk. Gateway Village is an early example of Garden City movement design. It was listed on the National Register of Historic Places in 1990.

== Description and history ==
Gateway Village is located on Bridgeport's East Side, occupying most of a block bounded by Connecticut Avenue, Stratford Avenue, Hewitt Street, and Waterman Street. It consists of a series of grouped rowhouses, all built out of brick in the Tudor Revival style. They are 2 1/2 stories in height, and share a common architectural vocabulary of dormered slate roofs, entries with bracketed shed roof hoods, and sash windows topped by pointed-arch lintels. Much of the complex is oriented around Alanson Road, which functions as a large courtyard space for many of the units.

The development begun in 1916, and was the first project of the Bridgeport Housing Company, which was established by the city to provide worker housing needed for the city's war-related businesses. The project was the design work of Mead & Schenk, a New York City firm that was one of the first to be headed by women and whose known works are small in number. The development is a good early example of design inspired by the Garden City movement.

== See also ==
- National Register of Historic Places listings in Bridgeport, Connecticut
