= Railroad Avenue Historic District =

Railroad Avenue Historic District may refer to:

in the United States

(by state)

- Railroad Avenue Historic District (Opelika, Alabama), listed on the NRHP in Lee County, Alabama
- Railroad Avenue Historic District (Willcox, Arizona), listed on the NRHP in Cochise County, Arizona
- Railroad Avenue Industrial District, Bridgeport, CT, listed on the NRHP in Bridgeport, Connecticut
- Railroad Avenue Historic District (Las Vegas, New Mexico), listed on the NRHP in San Miguel County, New Mexico
