= Palace and Majestic Theaters =

- U.S. National Register of Historic Places
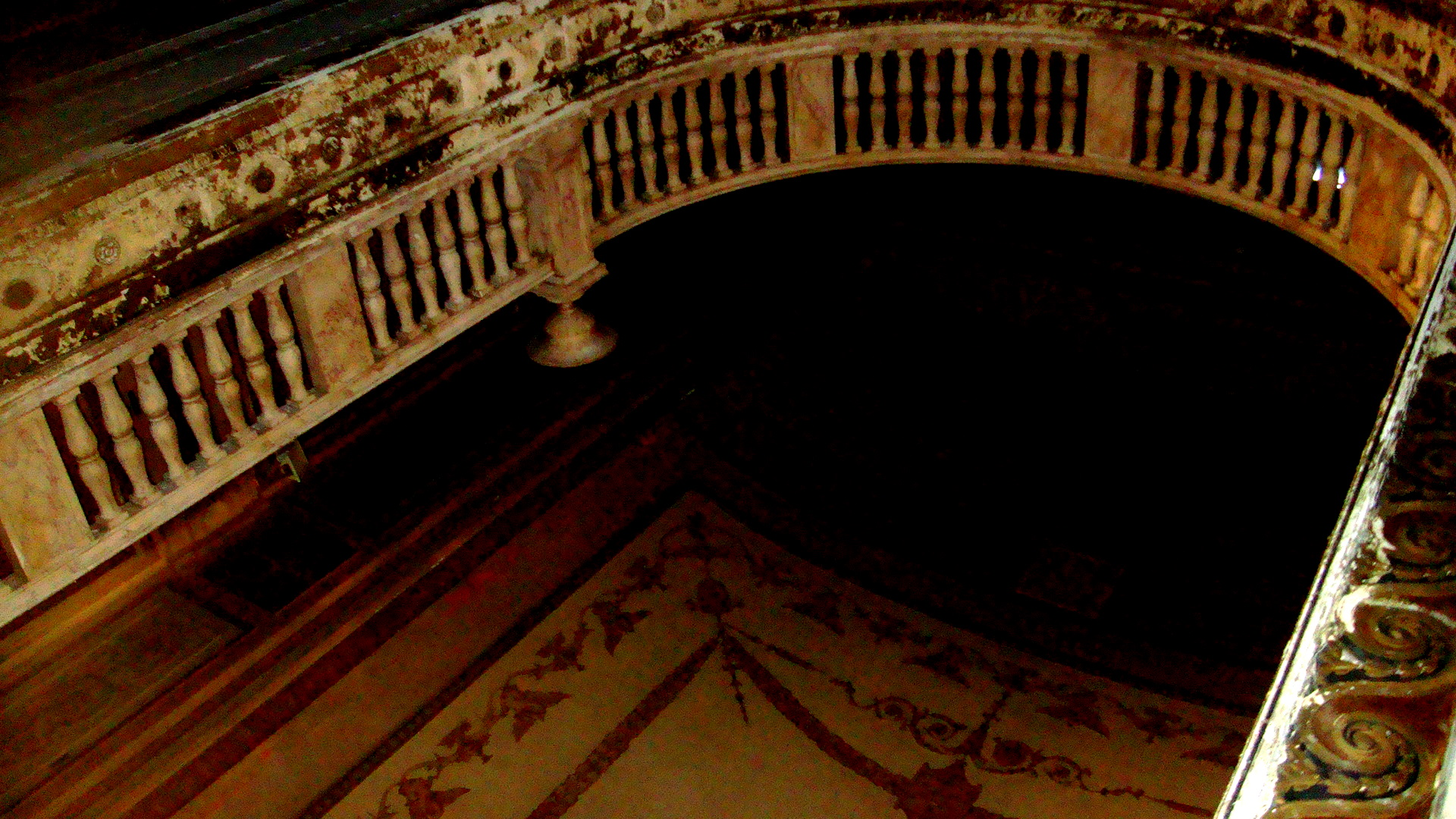
- Decaying balcony in Palace Theater

- Location within Connecticut Location within the United States
- Location: 1315-1357 Main Street, Bridgeport, Connecticut
- Coordinates: 41°10′56″N 73°11′28″W
- Area: 1.3 acres (0.53 ha)
- Built: 1921
- Architect: Lamb, Thomas W.
- Architectural style: Beaux Arts
- NRHP reference No.: 79002626
- Added to NRHP: December 14, 1979

The Palace Theater and the Majestic Theater are a pair of historic performance and film venues at 1315-1357 Main Street in Downtown Bridgeport, Connecticut. Built in 1921-22 by Sylvester Z. Poli in a single building that also housed a hotel, they were in their heyday a posh and opulent sight, designed by noted theater architect Thomas W. Lamb. The building has stood vacant and decaying since the 1970s, despite repeated attempts to restore its grandeur. The building was listed on the National Register of Historic Places in 1979.

== Description ==
The Palace/Majestic building is located at the northern end of Bridgeport's downtown area, its main facade occupying an entire block of Main Street between Congress and Arch Streets. It is a five-story building, built out of steel and reinforced concrete, with an elegant Beaux Arts exterior. The exterior is a combination of brick and concrete finished to resemble granite on the main facade, and mainly brick on the other sides. The interior is organized with the hotel in the front portion of the building, and the theaters side by side in the rear. The Palace Theater, on the left, has an original seating capacity of 3700, while the Majestic seated 2600.

== History ==
The complex was the inspiration of theater mogul Sylvester Z. Poli, who built a chain of vaudeville theaters across the northeastern United States in the late 19th and early 20th centuries. Poli hired the well-known theater architect Thomas W. Lamb, then at his creative peak, to design the structure. The theater bears some resemblance to another Poli/Lamb collaboration, the Palace Theater in Waterbury, Connecticut, also completed in 1922. The hotel built on top of the theaters was originally intended to cater to the traveling shows that played there and others associated with the performers. The theaters originally showed live vaudeville performance, but eventually transitioned to showing movies. The Palace was purchased by Loew's in 1934, and was known for a time as "Loew's Poli Theater".

When Bridgeport's factories began to close in the 1960s and 1970s, the fortunes of the complex declined, and both theaters closed in the 1970s. The Majestic in 1971 followed by the Palace in 1975. The entire building has stood vacant since then; there have been recurring efforts to restore it to its former glory.

== See also ==
- National Register of Historic Places listings in Bridgeport, Connecticut
