= Park Apartments =

Park Apartments may refer to:

- Park Apartments (Santa Rosa, California), listed on the National Register of Historic Places in Sonoma County, California
- Park Apartments (Bridgeport, Connecticut), listed on the National Register of Historic Places in Fairfield County, Connecticut
