= National Register of Historic Places listings in Bridgeport, Connecticut =

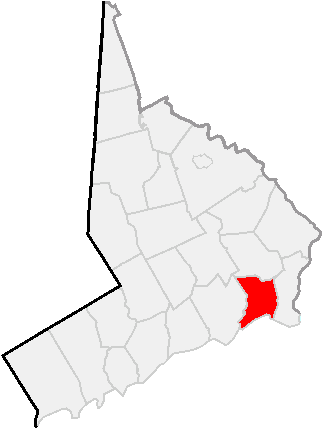
Location of Bridgeport in Fairfield County, Connecticut

This is a list of the National Register of Historic Places listings in Bridgeport, Connecticut.

This is intended to be a complete list of the properties and districts on the National Register of Historic Places in the city of Bridgeport, Connecticut, United States. The locations of National Register properties and districts for which the latitude and longitude coordinates are included below, may be seen in an online map.

There are 299 properties and districts listed on the National Register in Fairfield County, including 10 National Historic Landmarks. The city of Bridgeport is the location of 57 of these properties and districts, and one National Historic Landmark; they are listed here. Ones in Greenwich or Stamford are covered in National Register of Historic Places listings in Greenwich, Connecticut or in National Register of Historic Places listings in Stamford, Connecticut. The remainder are covered in National Register of Historic Places listings in Fairfield County, Connecticut.

Contents: Counties and municipalities in Connecticut

Fairfield (city of Bridgeport | town of Greenwich | city of Stamford) | Hartford (city of Hartford | town of Southington | town of West Hartford | town of Windsor) | Litchfield | Middlesex (city of Middletown) | New Haven (city of New Haven) | New London | Tolland | Windham

This National Park Service list is complete through NPS recent listings posted October 16, 2026.

== Current listings ==
	Name on the Register	Image	Date listed	Location	City or town	Description
1	Barnum Museum	Barnum Museum	November 7, 1972 (#72001300)	820 Main Street; 41°10′32″N 73°11′18″W	Downtown	Designated a National Historic Landmark in 2023.
2	Barnum/Palliser Historic District	Barnum/Palliser Historic District	December 16, 1982 (#82000995)	Roughly bounded by Myrtle and Park Avenues, Atlantic and Austin Streets (both sides); 41°10′04″N 73°11′03″W	South End	
3	Bassickville Historic District	Bassickville Historic District	September 8, 1987 (#87001511)	20-122 Bassick, 667-777 Howard, and 1521-1523 Fairview Avenues, and 50-1380 State Street; 41°10′16″N 73°12′40″W	West End - West Side	
4	Beardsley Park	Beardsley Park	March 18, 1999 (#98000357)	1875 Noble Avenue; 41°12′45″N 73°10′56″W	North Bridgeport	
5	Berkshire No. 7	Berkshire No. 7	December 21, 1978 (#78002837)	Bridgeport Harbor; 41°10′42″N 73°11′14″W	Downtown	One of three barges sunk in the harbor
6	Bikur Cholim Synagogue	Bikur Cholim Synagogue	November 27, 1995 (#95001341)	1545 Iranistan Avenue; 41°10′49″N 73°12′22″W	West End - West Side	
7	Peyton Randolph Bishop House	Peyton Randolph Bishop House	August 25, 1987 (#87000803)	135 Washington Avenue; 41°10′38″N 73°11′54″W	The Hollow	
8	William D. Bishop Cottage Development Historic District	William D. Bishop Cottage Development Historic District	June 28, 1982 (#82004388)	Cottage Place and Atlantic, Broad, Main and Whiting Streets; 41°10′05″N 73°11′14″W	South End	
9	Black Rock Gardens Historic District	Black Rock Gardens Historic District	September 26, 1990 (#90001430)	Bounded by Fairfield Avenue, Brewster Street and Nash Lane, including Rowsley and Haddon Streets; 41°09′27″N 73°13′30″W	Black Rock	
10	Black Rock Historic District	Black Rock Historic District	March 15, 1979 (#79002658)	Roughly bounded by Black Rock Harbor, Grovers Avenue, Beacon and Prescott Streets; 41°09′11″N 73°13′17″W	Black Rock	
11	Bridgeport City Hall	Bridgeport City Hall	September 19, 1977 (#77001387)	202 State Street; 41°10′36″N 73°11′27″W	Downtown	This listing is for the old city hall, known as McLevy Hall.
12	Bridgeport Downtown North Historic District	Bridgeport Downtown North Historic District	November 2, 1987 (#87001403)	Roughly bounded by Congress, Water, Fairfield Avenue, Elm, Golden Hill & Chapel Streets; 41°10′49″N 73°11′25″W	Downtown	
13	Bridgeport Downtown South Historic District	Bridgeport Downtown South Historic District	September 3, 1987 (#87001402)	Roughly bounded by Elm, Cannon, Main, Gilbert, and Broad Streets; 41°10′37″N 73°11′30″W	Downtown	
14	Cassidy House	Cassidy House	October 19, 2011 (#11000749)	691 Ellsworth Street; 41°09′48″N 73°13′26″W	Black Rock	An 1849 Italianate farmhouse in pristine condition; originally constructed by John Plumb, it was owned by the Cassidy family for over 109 years.
15	Connecticut Railway and Lighting Company Car Barn	Connecticut Railway and Lighting Company Car Barn	December 3, 1987 (#87001405)	55 Congress Street; 41°10′56″N 73°11′17″W	Downtown	
16	Deacon's Point Historic District	Deacon's Point Historic District	August 21, 1992 (#92001019)	Roughly bounded by Seaview Avenue and Williston, Bunnell and Deacon Streets; 41°10′59″N 73°10′13″W	East End	
17	Division Street Historic District	Division Street Historic District	June 3, 1982 (#82004385)	Roughly bounded by State Street, Iranistan, Black Rock and West Avenues; 41°10′19″N 73°15′00″W	Downtown and West End - West Side	
18	Downtown Bridgeport Historic District	Downtown Bridgeport Historic District	May 30, 2025 (#100011926)	Bounded by Congress Street, Water Street, Amtrak Railroad Tracks, I-95, and CT 8 & CT 25. 41°10′45″N 73°11′25″W	Downtown	
19	Eagle's Nest	Eagle's Nest	March 5, 1979 (#79002630)	282-284 Logan Street; 41°10′43″N 73°09′37″W	East End	Demolished.
20	East Bridgeport Historic District	East Bridgeport Historic District	April 25, 1979 (#79002659)	Roughly bounded by Railroad Tracks, Beach, Arctic, and Knowlton Streets; 41°11′14″N 73°11′09″W	East Side	
21	East Main Street Historic District	East Main Street Historic District	February 21, 1985 (#85000306)	Bounded by Walters and Nichols Streets from 371-377, 741-747, 388-394 and to 744 East Main Streets; 41°10′57″N 73°10′51″W	East Side	
22	Ein Jacob (Ayn Yacob) Synagogue	Ein Jacob (Ayn Yacob) Synagogue	November 27, 1995 (#95001342)	746 (aka 748) Connecticut Avenue; 41°10′50″N 73°09′51″W	East End	
23	Elmer S. Dailey	Elmer S. Dailey	December 21, 1978 (#78002838)	Bridgeport Harbor; 41°10′43″N 73°11′14″W	Downtown	One of three barges sunk in the harbor
24	Fairfield County Courthouse	Fairfield County Courthouse	January 21, 1982 (#82004376)	172 Golden Hill Street; 41°10′50″N 73°11′28″W	Downtown	The old courthouse, now a superior courthouse.
25	Fairfield County Jail	Fairfield County Jail	April 18, 1985 (#85000841)	1106 North Avenue; 41°11′25″N 73°12′07″W	Brooklawn - St. Vincent	Listed building demolished in 1997.
26	First Baptist Church	First Baptist Church	February 22, 1990 (#90000154)	126 Washington Avenue; 41°10′35″N 73°11′53″W	Downtown	
27	Mary and Eliza Freeman Houses	Mary and Eliza Freeman Houses	February 22, 1999 (#99000110)	352-4 and 358-60 Main Street; 41°10′11″N 73°11′12″W	South End	
28	Gateway Village Historic District	Gateway Village Historic District	September 26, 1990 (#90001429)	Roughly bounded by Waterman Street, Connecticut Avenue and Alanson Avenue; 41°09′27″N 73°13′30″W	East End	
29	Golden Hill Historic District	Golden Hill Historic District	September 3, 1987 (#87001404)	Roughly bounded by Congress Street, Lyon Terrence, Elm, and Harrison Streets; 41°10′52″N 73°11′36″W	Downtown	
30	Hotel Beach	Hotel Beach	December 14, 1978 (#78002839)	140 Fairfield Avenue; 41°10′45″N 73°11′26″W	Downtown	
31	Lakeview Village Historic District	Lakeview Village Historic District	September 26, 1990 (#90001428)	Roughly bounded by Essex Street, Boston Avenue, Colony Street, Plymouth Street and Asylum Street; 41°11′50″N 73°10′41″W	North Bridgeport	
32	Maplewood School	Maplewood School	February 21, 1990 (#90000153)	434 Maplewood Avenue; 41°10′42″N 73°12′35″W	West End - West Side	
33	Marina Park Historic District	Marina Park Historic District	April 27, 1982 (#82004382)	Marina Park, Park and Waldemere Avenues; 41°09′52″N 73°11′30″W	South End	
34	Nathaniel Wheeler Memorial Fountain	Nathaniel Wheeler Memorial Fountain	April 4, 1985 (#85000706)	Park and Fairfield Avenues; 41°10′29″N 73°11′55″W	West End - West Side	Built in 1912-1913, the fountain consists of four elements: a central bronze figure of a mermaid holding aloft a lamp and rising out of a polished granite pool and three individually ornamented polished granite watering troughs at the angles of the triangular parcel of land raised above the street. The fountain was a mid-career work of maverick American sculptor Gutzon Borglum.
35	Palace and Majestic Theaters	Palace and Majestic Theaters	December 14, 1979 (#79002626)	1315-1357 Main Street; 41°10′56″N 73°11′28″W	Downtown	
36	Park Apartments	Park Apartments	September 26, 1990 (#90001427)	59 Rennell Street; 41°09′39″N 73°11′40″W	South End	
37	Penfield Reef Light house	Penfield Reef Light house	September 27, 1990 (#89001473)	Long Island Sound off Shoal Point; 41°07′00″N 73°13′18″W	Long Island Sound	
38	Pequonnock River Railroad Bridge	Pequonnock River Railroad Bridge	June 12, 1987 (#87000843)	AMTRAK Right-of-way at Pequonnock River; 41°10′59″N 73°11′11″W	Downtown and East Side	
39	David Perry House	David Perry House	March 22, 1984 (#84000814)	531 Lafayette Street; 41°10′13″N 73°11′25″W	Downtown	
40	Priscilla Dailey	Priscilla Dailey	December 21, 1978 (#78002840)	Bridgeport Harbor; 41°10′43″N 73°11′14″W	Downtown	One of three barges sunk in the harbor
41	Railroad Avenue Industrial District	Railroad Avenue Industrial District	September 30, 1985 (#85002697)	Roughly bounded by State and Cherry Streets, Fairfield and Wordin Avenues; 41°04′40″N 73°12′49″W	West End - West Side	A cluster of old factory buildings in southern Bridgeport; some seem to have been torn down.
42	Remington City Historic District	Remington City Historic District	September 26, 1990 (#90001426)	Roughly, Bond, Dover, and Remington Streets and Palisade Avenue, between Stewart and Tudor Streets; 41°11′53″N 73°09′56″W	Boston Avenue - Mill Hill	
43	Remington Village Historic District	Remington Village Historic District	September 26, 1990 (#90001425)	Roughly, Willow and East Avenues between Boston and Barnum Avenues; 41°11′38″N 73°09′36″W	Boston Avenue - Mill Hill	
44	St. John's Episcopal Church	St. John's Episcopal Church	August 2, 1984 (#84000820)	768 Fairfield Avenue; 41°10′31″N 73°11′59″W	West End - West Side	
45	Seaside Institute	Seaside Institute	June 14, 1982 (#82004374)	299 Lafayette Street; 41°10′03″N 73°11′18″W	South End	A Richardsonian Romanesque rock-faced granite, brick, brownstone and terracotta building designed by Warren R. Briggs and completed in 1887, it was originally built for the use and benefit of the female employees of the Warner Brothers corset manufacturers (now Warnaco).
46	Seaside Park	Seaside Park	July 1, 1982 (#82004373)	Long Island Sound; 41°09′41″N 73°11′19″W	South End	
47	Seaside Village Historic District	Seaside Village Historic District	September 26, 1990 (#90001424)	East Side of Iranistan Avenue between South Street and Burnham Street; 41°09′59″N 73°11′56″W	South End	
48	Sterling Block-Bishop Arcade	Sterling Block-Bishop Arcade	December 20, 1978 (#78002841)	993-1005 Main Street; 41°10′41″N 73°11′24″W	Downtown	
49	Sterling Hill Historic District	Sterling Hill Historic District	April 2, 1992 (#92000335)	Roughly bounded by Pequonnock Street, Harral Avenue, James Street and Washington Avenue; 41°10′53″N 73°11′49″W	The Hollow	
50	Stratfield Historic District	Stratfield Historic District	June 23, 1980 (#80004060)	CT 59 and U.S. 1; 41°10′40″N 73°12′49″W	Brooklawn - St. Vincent and West End - West Side	300 buildings along Clinton, Brooklawn, and Laurel Avenues that made up an elite residential district of the Edwardian era and has the original 17th century town green, Clinton Park Militia Ground, and the city's oldest cemetery, Stratfield Burying Ground, also dating back to the 17th century; this area along North Avenue is the first European settlement in what is now Bridgeport.
51	Tongue Point Lighthouse	Tongue Point Lighthouse	May 29, 1990 (#89001478)	Western side of Bridgeport Harbor at Tongue Point; 41°09′58″N 73°10′42″W	South End	
52	United Congregational Church	United Congregational Church	July 19, 1984 (#84000822)	703 State Street; 41°10′30″N 73°12′00″W	West End - West Side	The building was acquired from United Congregationalist Church by the local Muslim community. The architectural design is colonial revivalist and was built in the 1920s. Colonial era Ivy League college pastors are interred here.
53	United Illuminating Company Building	United Illuminating Company Building	February 21, 1985 (#85000301)	1115-1119 Broad Street; 41°10′41″N 73°11′31″W	Downtown	
54	US Post Office-Bridgeport Main	US Post Office-Bridgeport Main	March 17, 1986 (#86000453)	120 Middle Street; 41°10′50″N 73°11′20″W	Downtown	
55	Waltersville School		January 21, 2025 (#100011334)	167 Steuben Street; 41°10′55″N 73°10′40″W		
56	West End Congregation-Achavath Achim Synagogue	West End Congregation-Achavath Achim Synagogue	May 11, 1995 (#95000574)	725 Hancock Avenue; 41°10′12″N 73°12′44″W	West End - West Side	
57	Wilmot Apartments Historic District	Wilmot Apartments Historic District	September 26, 1990 (#90001423)	Junction of Connecticut and Wilmot Avenues; 41°10′58″N 73°09′44″W	East End	

== Former listings ==
	Name on the Register	Image	Date listed	Date removed	Location	City or town	Description
1	Capt. John Brooks Sr. House		October 15, 1970 (#70000738)	January 23, 1979	199 Pembroke Street	Bridgeport, Connecticut	Dismantled in 1975

== See also ==
- History of Bridgeport, Connecticut
- National Register of Historic Places listings in Fairfield County, Connecticut
- National Register of Historic Places listings in Stamford, Connecticut
- National Register of Historic Places listings in Greenwich, Connecticut
