= David Perry House =

Historic house in Connecticut, United States

- U.S. National Register of Historic Places
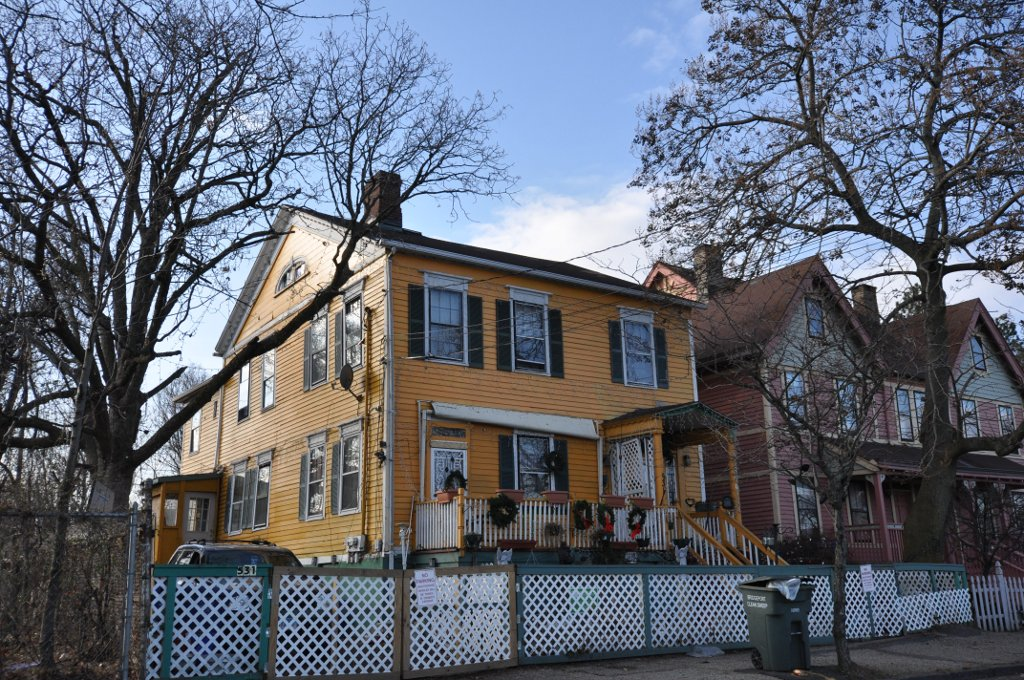

- Location within Connecticut Location within the United States
- Location: 531 Lafayette Street, Bridgeport, Connecticut
- Coordinates: 41°10′13″N 73°11′25″W
- Area: less than one acre
- Built: 1826
- Architectural style: Federal
- NRHP reference No.: 84000814
- Added to NRHP: March 22, 1984

The David Perry House is a historic house at 531 Lafayette Street in Bridgeport, Connecticut. Built in 1826, it is the only known Federal period dwelling extant within the historic bounds of Bridgeport's original village center. It was listed on the National Register of Historic Places in 1984.

== Description and history ==
The David Perry House stands at the southern fringe of Bridgeport's downtown area, near the northwest corner of Lafayette Street and Railroad Avenue. It is a 2 1/2-story wood-frame structure, with a clapboarded exterior and a side gable roof pierced by an off-center brick chimney. Its main facade is three bays wide, with the main entrance in the rightmost bay, sheltered by a gabled porch supported by round columns. Sash windows occupy the other bays, which are irregularly spaced; the upper-level windows have headers with projecting cornices. The south-facing side elevation is four bays wide, with a half-oval window in the gable end.

The house was built in 1826 for David Perry, a local businessman active in the city's whaling industry. The house was originally located nearer the waterfront, where Perry had several docks devoted to his business. Perry was apparently ultimately unsuccessful in whaling; his business was already in decline when his wharves and warehouses were destroyed by fire in 1845. The house was moved to its present location in 1871, when the waterfront property it occupied was slated for construction of a new factory. It was then used as a tenement for lower-income workers for many years.

== See also ==
- National Register of Historic Places listings in Bridgeport, Connecticut
