= Sterling Block-Bishop Arcade =

- U.S. National Register of Historic Places
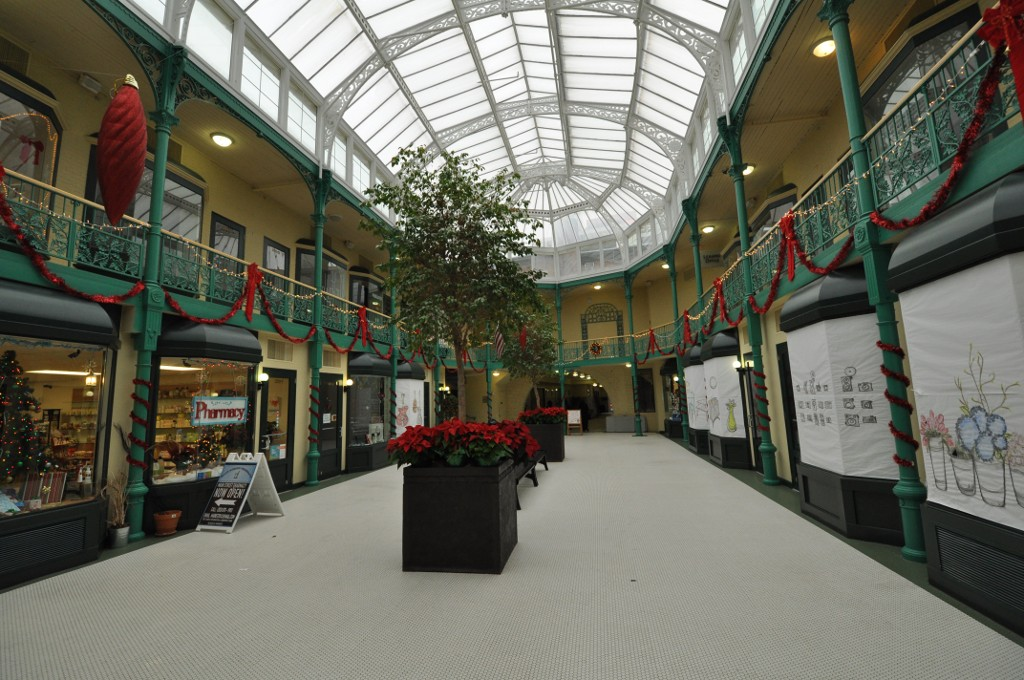
- Interior view of the arcade

- Location within Connecticut Location within the United States
- Location: 993-1005 Main Street, Bridgeport, Connecticut
- Coordinates: 41°10′41″N 73°11′24″W
- Area: 0.8 acres (0.32 ha)
- Built: 1841
- Architect: Longstaff & Hurd
- Architectural style: Greek Revival, Gothic
- NRHP reference No.: 78002841
- Added to NRHP: December 20, 1978

The Sterling Block-Bishop Arcade is a historic commercial building at 993-1005 Main Street in Downtown Bridgeport, Connecticut. Built in 1841 and expanded several times in the 19th century, it is one of the oldest of the city's commercial buildings. It was also the first indoor shopping mall in the state. It was listed on the National Register of Historic Places in 1978.

== Description and history ==
The Sterling Block-Bishop Arcade is located in Bridgeport's Downtown commercial area, on the West Side of Main Street midway between Cannon and John Streets. It is a four-story masonry building, fifteen bays wide. The exterior retains only minimal elements of its original 19th-century styling, while its principal interior feature, the glass-roofed two-story arcade, retains original iron columns, arches, and scrollwork.

The northerly portion of the building is its oldest section, dating to 1841. It was built as part of the Sterling Hotel, which opened in a wood-frame structure in 1835, when the area was still mainly residential. That building's site is now occupied by this building's southern six bays. In 1850, the hotel demolished the wood-frame structure and built an addition to the 1841 structure. In 1889 William D. Bishop, a prominent local businessman, oversaw a second expansion of the building and construction of the arcade, which was designed as a connector between Main Street and the city's post office. The arcade rapidly became a high-profile shopping location.

== See also ==
- National Register of Historic Places listings in Bridgeport, Connecticut
