= Deacon's Point Historic District =

Historic district in Connecticut, United States

- U.S. National Register of Historic Places
- U.S. Historic district
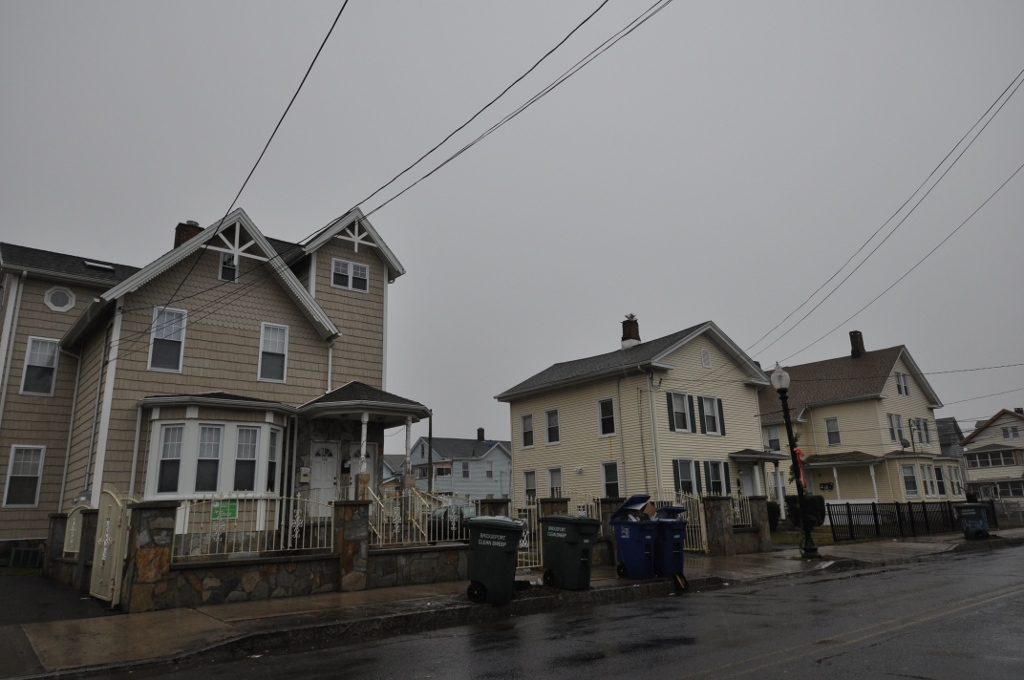
- Seaview Avenue

- Location within Connecticut Location within the United States
- Location: Roughly bounded by Seaview Avenue and Williston, Bunnell and Deacon Streets, Bridgeport, Connecticut
- Coordinates: 41°10′59″N 73°10′13″W
- Area: 16.5 acres (6.7 ha)
- Architect: Lamson, Harrison A.; Et al.
- Architectural style: Bungalow/craftsman, Late Victorian, Italianate
- NRHP reference No.: 92001019
- Added to NRHP: August 21, 1992

The Deacon's Point Historic District encompasses a historic 19th-century residential area of eastern Bridgeport, Connecticut. Roughly bounded by Seaview Avenue and Williston, Bunnell and Deacon Streets, the district was first laid out for development shortly after the American Civil War, and contains modest examples of residential architecture dating from 1866 to the early 20th century. The district was listed on the National Register of Historic Places in 1992.

== Description and history ==
Deacon's Point is a residential area in Bridgeport's East End, located on the east side of the Yellow Mill Channel, a finger of Bridgeport's harbor. The historic district consists of most of the single blocks of Williston, Holly, and Deacon Streets extending east from Seaview Avenue, as well as houses on the connecting sections of Seaview Avenue. There are 79 buildings, most of which are residential. About one third were built before 1880, and are vernacular examples of period Italianate architecture. About one half of the buildings were built between 1880, and are modest examples of Queen Anne, Stick style, and other typically late Victorian styles. Most of the few 20th-century buildings are multiunit residences.

The Deacon's Point area was first developed in the post-Civil War years, when it was part of Stratford. In 1889, the area was annexed to Bridgeport, which spurred a housing boom in the neighborhood. The area has since been surrounded by later development, but is still distinguished from those areas by its distinct Victorian architecture.

== See also ==
- National Register of Historic Places listings in Bridgeport, Connecticut
