= Plumb Memorial Library =

- U.S. National Register of Historic Places
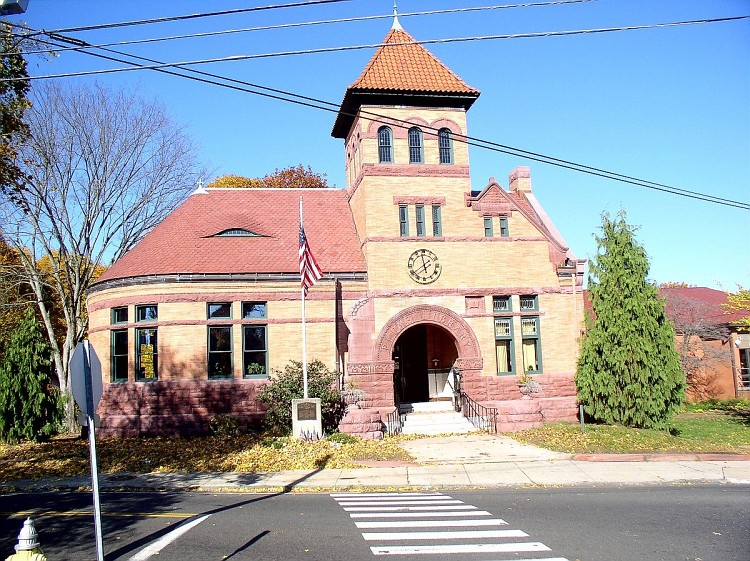

- Location within Connecticut Location within the United States
- Location: 65 Wooster Street Shelton, Connecticut
- Coordinates: 41°19′9″N 73°5′56″W
- Area: 0.2 acres (0.081 ha)
- Built: 1895
- Architect: Charles T. Beardsley, Jr.
- Architectural style: Romanesque Revival
- NRHP reference No.: 78002845
- Added to NRHP: November 7, 1978

The Plumb Memorial Library is a public library in Shelton, Connecticut. It is located at 65 Wooster Street in an architecturally distinguished Richardsonian Romanesque building designed by Bridgeport architect Charles T. Beardsley, Jr. and built in 1895. It was listed on the National Register of Historic Places in 1978. The building is named in memory of David Wells Plumb, a local businessman and philanthropist, whose widow donated land for its construction. A modern addition was added in 1975, significantly enlarging the library's space and look.

== See also ==
- National Register of Historic Places listings in Fairfield County, Connecticut
