= Palace Theater (Waterbury, Connecticut) =

- U.S. National Register of Historic Places
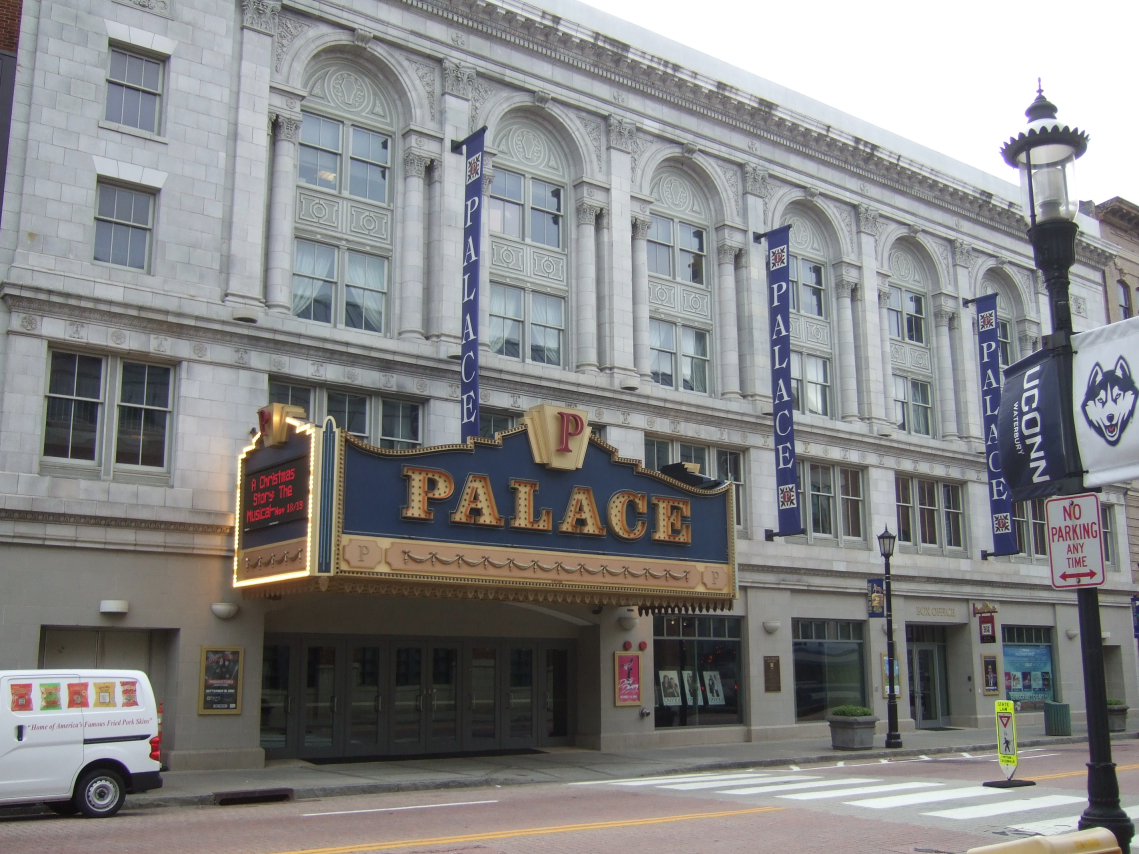

- Location within Connecticut Location within the United States
- Location: 100 East Main Street, Waterbury, Connecticut
- Coordinates: 41°33′19″N 73°02′23″W
- Area: 1.5 acres (0.61 ha)
- Built: 1921
- Architect: Lamb, Thomas W.
- Architectural style: Late 19th And 20th Century Revivals, 2nd Renaissance Revival
- NRHP reference No.: 83001284
- Added to NRHP: June 30, 1983

The Palace Theater is a 2,570-seat auditorium at 100 East Main Street in downtown Waterbury, Connecticut. The theater currently presents a variety of live entertainment, hosting traveling productions and locally produced events. It was built in 1921 to a Renaissance Revival design by Thomas W. Lamb, and is an architecturally prominent element of the city's downtown. It underwent a major restoration in the early 21st century, and is listed on the National Register of Historic Places.

== Architecture ==
The Palace Theater is located in downtown Waterbury, on the south side of East Main Street, east of the city green. It occupies about 125 feet (38 m) of street frontage, with a series of small storefronts on the ground floor to the right of the theater entrance. The entrance sheltered by a large marquee that projects over the sidewalk. The upper levels of the four-story building are organized into eight bays, with the center six having the most elaborate treatment. The second floor has bands of three windows in each of these bays, and is separated from the upper two floors by a cornice. The upper bays have two-story round-arch windows, flanked by round columns and separated from each other by Corinthian pilasters. A frieze band and cornice cap the building. The interior lobby and auditorium spaces are richly decorated.

== History ==
The theater was built in 1922 to a design by Thomas W. Lamb, one of the foremost designers of theaters of the period. When it opened, it was judged to be the city's finest performance venue, hosting traveling vaudeville shows and the latest movies. It was part of the business empire of Sylvester Z. Poli, who controlled as many as thirty theaters, most in the northeastern United States. Only two of Poli's theaters survive in some form, and this one is exceptionally well preserved. The theater closed in 1987, and stood shuttered for eighteen years. It was given a $30 million restoration completed by the Tomasso Group and reopened in 2004.

== Concert Venue ==
The Palace Theater has hosted a number of music concerts including two by the Grateful Dead in September 1972, one by Old and in the Way a bluegrass band with Jerry Garcia on banjo and vocals in June 1973, and two by the Jerry Garcia Band in May 1976 and November 1977.

== See also ==
- National Register of Historic Places listings in New Haven County, Connecticut
