= East Main Street Historic District (Bridgeport, Connecticut) =

Historic district in Connecticut, United States

- U.S. National Register of Historic Places
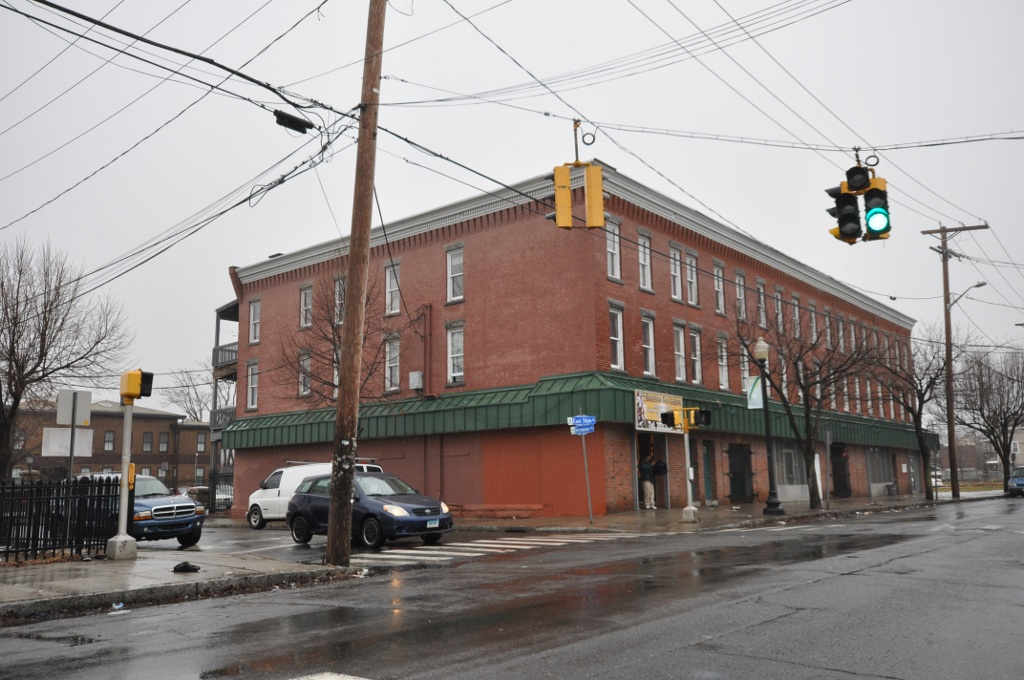

- Location within Connecticut Location within the United States
- Location: Bounded by Walters and Nichols Streets from 371-377, 741-747, 388-394 and to 744 East Main Streets, Bridgeport, Connecticut
- Coordinates: 41°10′57″N 73°10′51″W
- Area: 16 acres (6.5 ha)
- Built: 1855
- Architect: Multiple
- Architectural style: Late Victorian
- NRHP reference No.: 85000306
- Added to NRHP: February 21, 1985

The East Main Street Historic District encompasses a well-preserved late 19th-century commercial area on the east side of Bridgeport, Connecticut. Extending along East Main Street from Interstate 95 to Crescent Place, the district arose as part of a major development push orchestrated by P.T. Barnum in the 1850s, and contains one of Connecticut's finest assemblages of late Victorian commercial architecture. The district was listed on the National Register of Historic Places in 1985.

== Description and history ==
The East Main Street Historic District is located along several blocks of Bridgeport's East Main Street, a north–south spine of commercial activity on the city's East Side. The district extends roughly from the Interstate 95 junction in the south, to the railroad tracks in the north. It is characterized by densely built masonry commercial buildings, set close to the sidewalk, and often directly abutting adjacent buildings. Most buildings are two to four stories in height, and feature some level of late 19th-century Victorian architectural styling on their facades. Many buildings have modified storefronts in which such details have been removed, while others merely obscure the surviving details under later coverings.

Bridgeport's East Side was developed beginning in the 1850s through the efforts of P.T. Barnum, one of the city's major boosters of the period, and William H. Noble, whose father had purchased much land on the east side with an eye towards development. Barnum had a vision of developing the area as a new commercial, industrial, and residential area, forming what became in some respects a second city. He built factory buildings to attract business, and sold off other parcels for housing and commercial development. East Main Street became the commercial hub for much of this economic activity, providing services to local workers for whom downtown Bridgeport (across the Pequonnock River was less convenient. Because architectural parts were one of the city's industrial outputs, the area features a particularly fine array of detail, not often found elsewhere in the state.

== See also ==
- National Register of Historic Places listings in Bridgeport, Connecticut
