= Peyton Randolph Bishop House =

Historic house in Connecticut, United States

- U.S. National Register of Historic Places
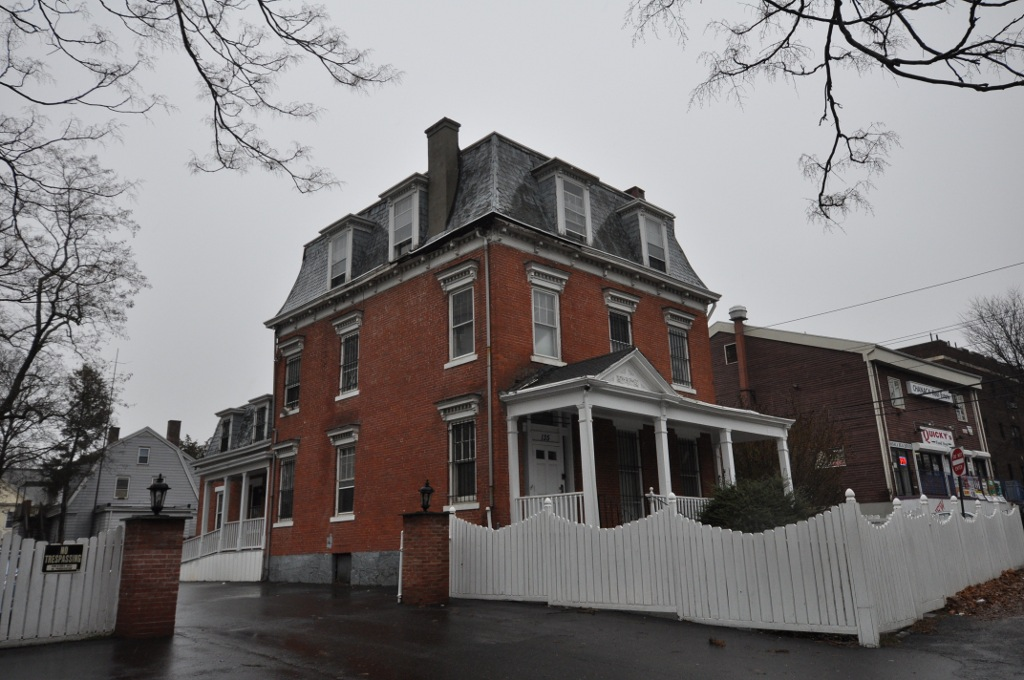

- Location within Connecticut Location within the United States
- Location: 135 Washington Avenue, Bridgeport, Connecticut
- Coordinates: 41°10′38″N 73°11′54″W
- Area: 0.2 acres (0.081 ha)
- Built: 1839
- Built by: Bishop, Peyton Randolph
- Architectural style: Greek Revival, Late Victorian
- NRHP reference No.: 87000803
- Added to NRHP: August 25, 1987

The Peyton Randolph Bishop House is a historic house at 135 Washington Avenue in Bridgeport, Connecticut. Built in 1839 by a local building contractor and later given Second Empire features, it is a rare surviving example of Greek Revival architecture in Bridgeport's urban core. The house was listed on the National Register of Historic Places in 1987.

== Description and history ==
The Peyton Randolph Bishop House is located on the ridge known as Golden Hill overlooking Bridgeport's downtown area, on the west side of Washington Avenue at Washington Terrace. It is a three-story brick structure, three bays wide, with a side entrance, single-story front porch, and a mansard roof. A 1 1/2-story ell extends to the rear of the main block. The front ground floor windows are full length, a Greek Revival feature. Other windows have dentillated and bracketed cornices, echoing similar features of the main roof line and dormers. The interior has a typical Greek Revival side staircase plan, and retains many original Greek Revival features.

The house was built in 1839, a time when some of Bridgeport's growing upper class built houses in this part of the new city. Peyton Bishop was a native of Guilford who was hired to build a complex of worker housing on the north slope of Golden Hill. His house appears to be one of the only residences to survive from that period in this area. The house's third owner, Philo Skidmore, purchased the house in 1864, and probably made the Second Empire modifications (mansard roof and decorative moulding) that are also relatively rare in the city. The front porch is also a later addition, made by Skidmore's son along with some interior alterations.

== See also ==
- National Register of Historic Places listings in Bridgeport, Connecticut
