= Eagle's Nest (Bridgeport, Connecticut) =

Historic house in Connecticut, United States

- U.S. National Register of Historic Places
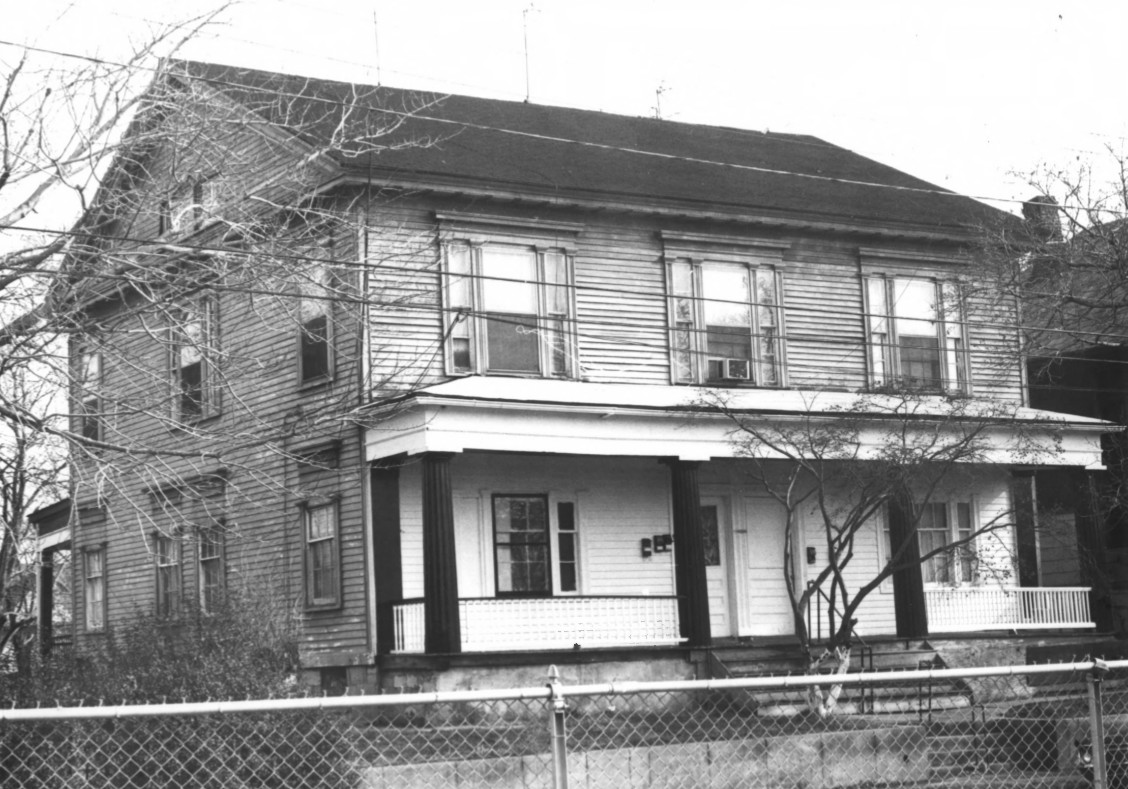
- 1977 photo

- Location within Connecticut Location within the United States
- Location: 282-284 Logan Street, Bridgeport, Connecticut
- Coordinates: 41°10′43″N 73°9′37″W
- Area: 0.8 acres (0.32 ha)
- Built: 1830-1832
- Built by: Wooster Curtis
- Architectural style: Greek Revival, Federal
- NRHP reference No.: 79002630
- Added to NRHP: March 5, 1979

The Eagle's Nest, also once known as the Johnson-DeRivera House, was a house at 282-284 Logan Street in Bridgeport, Connecticut. Constructed 1830-32, it was the centerpiece of a large farm prior to the area's subdivision and residential development, and was home to what is believed to be Connecticut's first Puerto Rican immigrant. The house was listed on the National Register of Historic Places in 1979. The house was subsequently damaged by an arsonist and demolished; on its site is the Jettie Tisdale School.

== Description and history ==
The Eagle's Nest was located on Logan Street in eastern Bridgeport, on a parcel bounded by Logan, Hewitt, Kelsey, and Alex Streets; this was a small surviving fraction of the original 300-acre (120 ha) estate at whose center it stood. It was a two-story wood-frame structure, with a gabled roof and clapboarded exterior. Its main facade was three bays wide, with a hip-roof porch sheltering its first floor. Windows on the facade were three-section units, with narrow sash windows flanking a central sash, the sections separated and flanked by slender pilasters.

The house was built in 1830-32 by Edwards Johnson, who was a gentleman farmer and an oyster cultivator, and who was a grandson of statesman William Samuel Johnson. Johnson apparently sought unsuccessfully to subdivide the property for residential development, and sold it in 1844 to Jose DeRivera, a Puerto Rican wine and sugar merchant. DeRivera is believed to be one of the state's first known Puerto Rican immigrants, and later anglicized his name to "Revere". DeRivera remained only ten years, selling the farm and moving to Ohio in 1854, where he developed some of the islands in western Lake Erie. The property continued to be farmed until about 1910, when the house was converted into a multiunit rental property. By the time of its listing on the National Register in 1979, it was in deteriorated condition.

== See also ==
- National Register of Historic Places listings in Bridgeport, Connecticut
