= Ein Jacob (Ayn Yacob) Synagogue =

- U.S. National Register of Historic Places
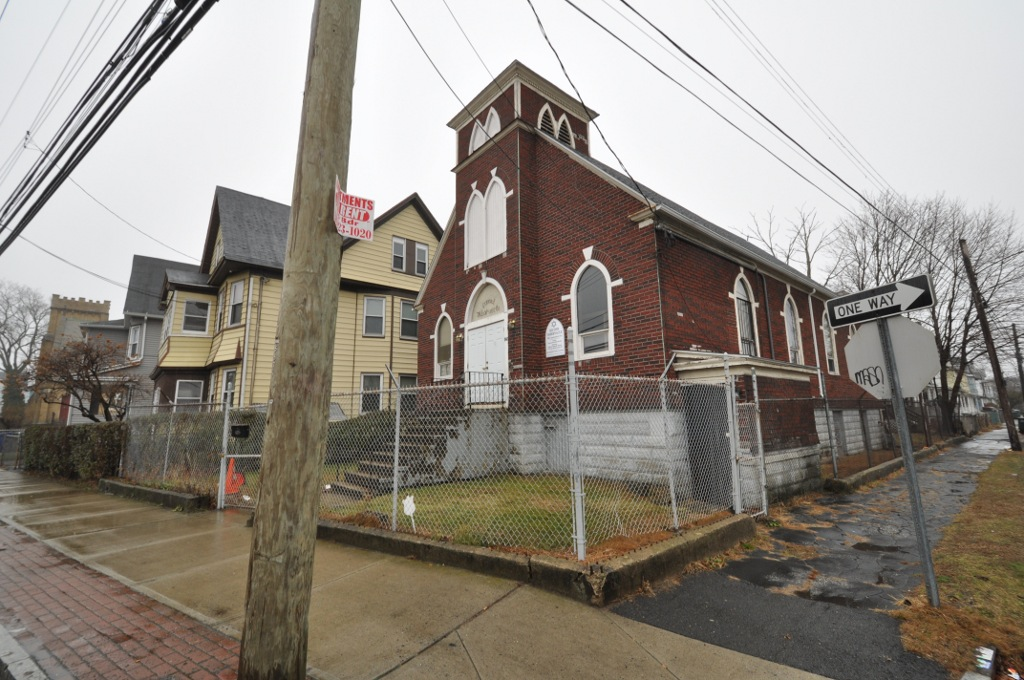

- Location within Connecticut Location within the United States
- Location: 746 (aka 748) Connecticut Avenue, Bridgeport, Connecticut
- Coordinates: 41°10′50″N 73°9′51″W
- Area: less than one acre
- Built: 1911
- Architectural style: Late Gothic Revival, Colonial Revival
- MPS: Historic Synagogues of Connecticut MPS
- NRHP reference No.: 95001342
- Added to NRHP: November 27, 1995

Ein Jacob (Ayn Yacob) Synagogue (also known previously as the Swedish (East End) Lutheran Church and currently as The Church of God and Saints-Christ) is a historic religious building at 748 Connecticut Avenue in Bridgeport, Connecticut. Built in 1918, it is notable for its relatively sophisticated architectural appearance, despite a use of relatively low-cost materials for the period. The building was added to the National Register of Historic Places in 1995.

== Description and history ==
The former Ein Jacob Synagogue is located in Bridgeport's East End neighborhood, at the southeast corner of Connecticut Avenue and Carroll Avenue. It is a single-story wood-frame structure, set on a foundation of concrete blocks finished to resemble quarry-cut stone. The building is sided with asbestos siding scored to resemble brick. The main facade is three bays wide, with a central projecting section which houses the main entrance and rises to a low square tower. The flanking windows have Gothic points, and are topped by brick headers with keystones at the top and impost blocks at the sides.

The building was constructed in 1918 for a Christian congregation of Swedish Lutherans. By 1918 it had been taken over by the Ein Jacob congregation, which occupied the premises until disbanding in 1962. The building was then sold to the present congregation, the Church of God and Saints-Christ. The building is architecturally distinguished for its unusual use of low-cost materials to produce a comparatively sophisticated Gothic appearance.

The building was one of fifteen Connecticut synagogues added to the National Register of Historic Places in 1995 and 1996 in response to an unprecedented multiple submission, nominating nineteen synagogues.

== See also ==
- National Register of Historic Places listings in Bridgeport, Connecticut
