= Remington Village Historic District =

- U.S. National Register of Historic Places
- U.S. Historic district
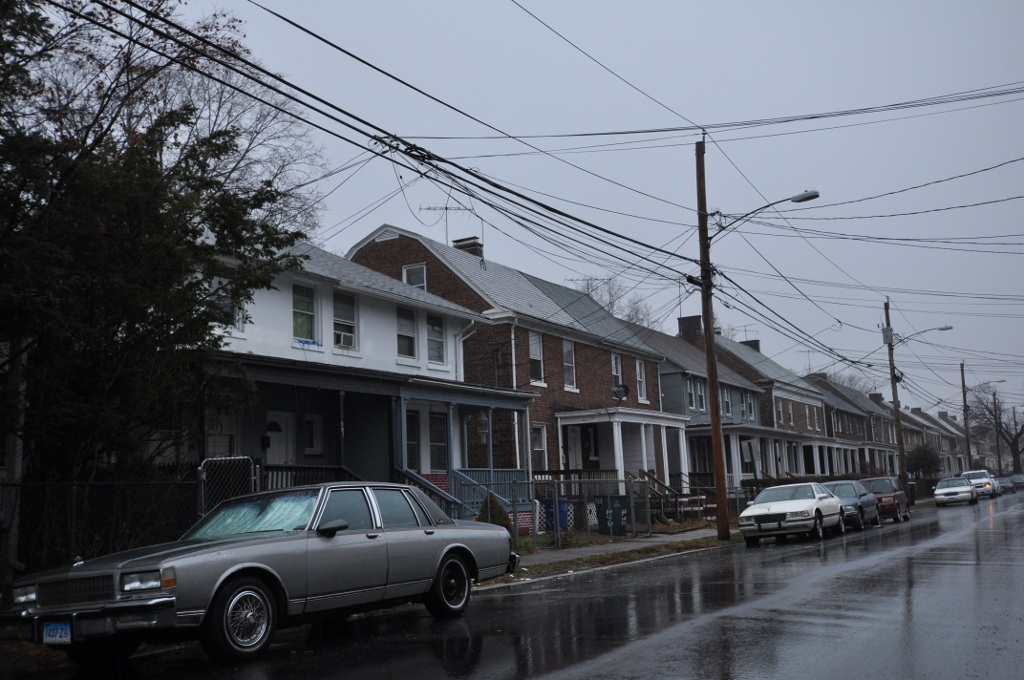
- Housing on East Avenue

- Location within Connecticut Location within the United States
- Location: Roughly, Willow and East Avenues between Boston and Barnum Avenues, Bridgeport, Connecticut
- Coordinates: 41°11′38″N 73°9′36″W
- Area: 14 acres (5.7 ha)
- Architect: Hiss & Weeks; Bossom, Alfred
- Architectural style: Colonial Revival
- MPS: Wartime Emergency Housing in Bridgeport MPS
- NRHP reference No.: 90001425
- Added to NRHP: September 26, 1990

The Remington Village Historic District encompasses a World War I-era housing development in northeastern Bridgeport, Connecticut. Located on Willow Street and East Avenue between Boston and Barnum Avenues, the area was developed by the Remington Arms company to attract workers to its nearby munitions factory. The complex is a well-preserved example of wartime housing in the city, and was listed on the National Register of Historic Places in 1990.

== Description and history ==
Remington Village is located in northeastern Bridgeport, forming a densely built residential enclave in what is now a mixed-use residential/commercial/industrial area. It is located a short way southeast of the former Remington Arms factory site, now the location of Warren Harding High School. The north–south roads in the district, Willow Street and East Avenue, are lined with duplexes that share a common vocabulary of brick exteriors and Colonial Revival styling. There are ten different designs present among the 76 buildings in the district, placed randomly to give an appearance of organic growth to what was in fact a planned development. The principal variations in design are to the roof (typically either gabled or gable-on-hip), and to the front porches, some of which extend across the entire front of the building as opposed to occupying only one or two bays, and some that rise two stories instead of just one.

Land for the complex was acquired in 1915 by the Remington Arms company, and construction took place over the following years. The development was designed by the New York City firm Hiss and Weekes, under the supervision of Alfred Bossom. It is one of the oldest surviving residential developments made in the city to attract workers to meet local industrial demand during World War I.

== See also ==
- National Register of Historic Places listings in Bridgeport, Connecticut
