= Bikur Cholim Synagogue =

- U.S. National Register of Historic Places
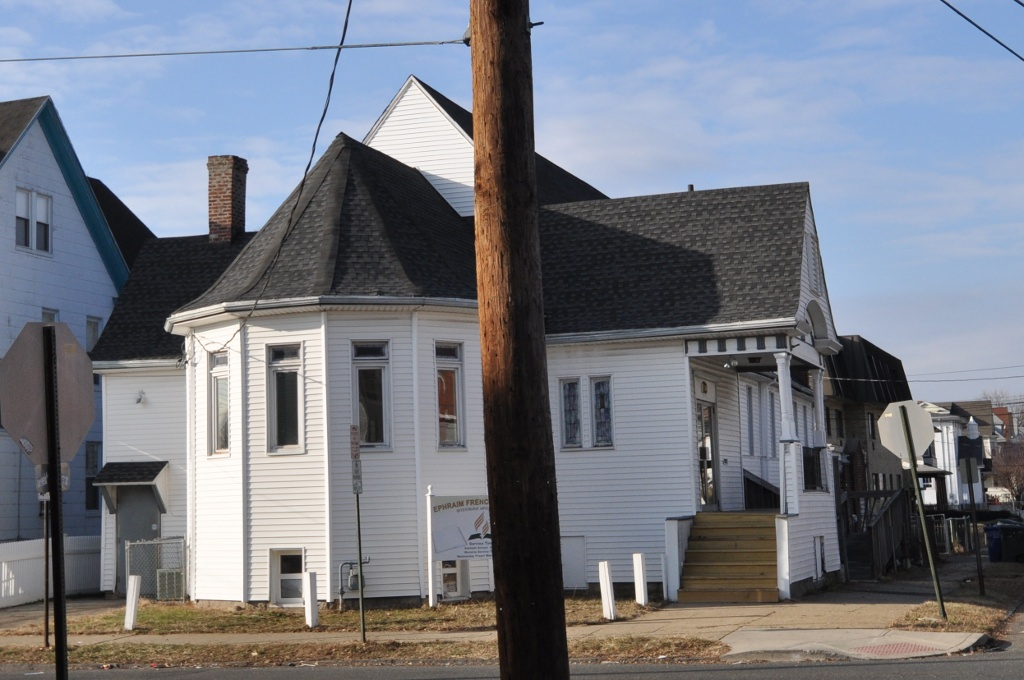

- Location within Connecticut Location within the United States
- Location: 1545 Iranistan Avenue, Bridgeport, Connecticut
- Coordinates: 41°10′49″N 73°12′22″W
- Area: less than one acre
- Built: c. 1894
- Architectural style: Shingle Style
- MPS: Historic Synagogues of Connecticut MPS
- NRHP reference No.: 95001341
- Added to NRHP: November 27, 1995

The Bikur Cholim Synagogue is a historic religious building at 1545 Iranistan Avenue in Bridgeport, Connecticut, in the United States. Built about 1894 for a Congregational church, it housed two different Jewish congregations from 1929 to 1989. After serving as a commercial establishment for a time, it now houses a Seventh-day Adventist congregation. The building is a distinctive example of the Shingle style of architecture, and was listed on the National Register of Historic Places in 1995.

== Description and history ==
The former Bikur Cholim Synagogue is located on Bridgeport's west side, at the northwest corner of Maplewood and Iranistan Avenues. It is a single-story frame structure, with its main section covered by a gabled roof. A polygonal apse section projects toward Maplewood Avenue from the main section, with the entrance in a transept section projecting toward Iranistan Avenue from the junction of these two sections. The exterior is now mostly clad in synthetic siding, with the northeastern end of the building finished in brick.

The building was constructed about 1894 as a mission outpost of Bridgeport's South Congregational Church, and was used by that church until 1907. It has housed First Christian Church (Christ's Disciples) (1907–1914), Congregation Rodeph Sholom (which used the building from 1923 until 1949 when the congregation move to Capitol Avenue), Congregation Bikur Cholim (which used the building until the congregation moved to Capitol Avenue in 1989), and Metamorphosis an interior decorating design business (until 1993). The building is now the home of Ephraim French Speaking Seventh-day Adventist Church.

The building was one of fifteen Connecticut synagogues added to the National Register of Historic Places in 1995 and 1996 in response to an unprecedented multiple submission, nominating nineteen synagogues.

It is unusual as an example of Shingle Style architecture applied for a religious building in an urban setting; Shingle Style was primarily used for residences, often ocean-side residences in resort areas.

== See also ==
- National Register of Historic Places listings in Bridgeport, Connecticut
