= Remington City Historic District =

- U.S. National Register of Historic Places
- U.S. Historic district
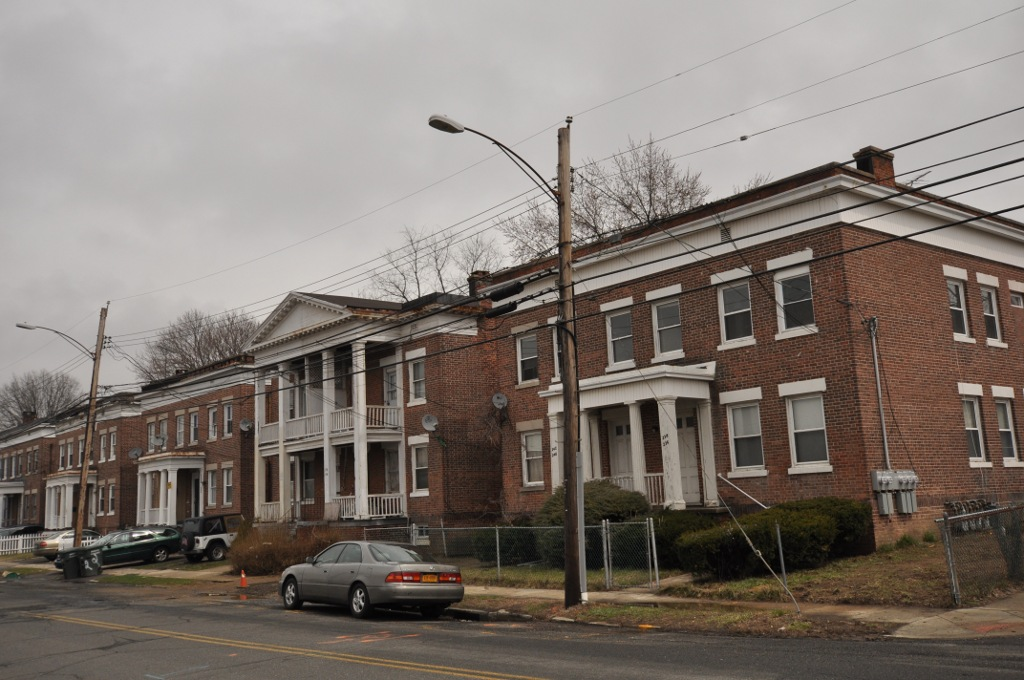
- Housing on Bond Street

- Location within Connecticut Location within the United States
- Location: Roughly, Bond, Dover, and Remington Streets and Palisade Avenue between Stewart and Tudor Streets Bridgeport, Connecticut
- Coordinates: 41°11′53″N 73°9′56″W
- Area: 18 acres (7.3 ha)
- Architect: Hiss & Weeks; Bossom, Alfred
- Architectural style: Colonial Revival
- MPS: Wartime Emergency Housing in Bridgeport MPS
- NRHP reference No.: 90001426
- Added to NRHP: September 26, 1990

The Remington City Historic District encompasses a World War I-era housing development in northeastern Bridgeport, Connecticut. Bounded by Stewart, Tudor, and Bond Streets, and Palisade Avenue, the area was developed by the Remington Arms company to attract workers to its nearby munitions factory. The complex is a well-preserved example of wartime housing in the city, and was listed on the National Register of Historic Places in 1990.

== Description and history ==
Remington City is located in northeastern Bridgeport, forming a densely built residential enclave in what is now a mixed-use residential/commercial/industrial area. It is located a short way northeast of the former Remington Arms factory site, now the location of Warren Harding High School. The north–south roads in the district, Bond, Dover, and Remington Streets, are all lined with a mixture of duplexes and rowhouses, with a small number of interspersed single-family dwellings. All three stricts exhibit a similar rhythm in the layout and construction of these buildings, which all feature predominantly brick construction and Colonial Revival features. Palisade Avenue, which forms the area's eastern boundary, includes three nearly identical large apartment houses also built by Remington Arms. Each is three stories in height and forms a U shape with a center entry pavilion rising either one or two stories.

Land for the complex was acquired in 1916 by the Remington Arms company, and construction took place over the following years. The development was designed by the New York City firm Hiss and Weekes, under the supervision of Alfred Bossom. It is one of the oldest surviving residential developments made in the city to attract workers to meet local industrial demand during World War I.

== See also ==
- National Register of Historic Places listings in Bridgeport, Connecticut
