= Anna Pendleton Schenck =

American architect (1874–1915)

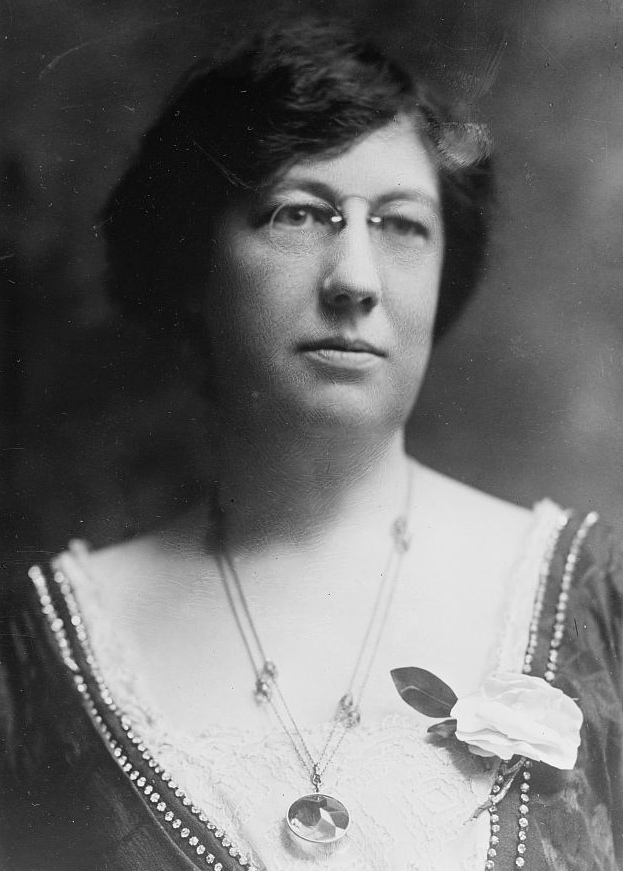
- Born: January 8, 1874; Brooklyn, NY
- Died: April 29, 1915 (aged 41); Manhattan, New York
- Occupation: Architect
- Parents: Noah Hunt Schenck (father); Ann Pierce Pendleton (mother)

Anna Pendleton Schenck (January 8, 1874 – April 29, 1915) was an architect. She was the business partner of Marcia Mead (1879–1967) and they established the first female architectural firm in New York City in 1914.

== Biography ==
Schenck was born on January 8, 1874, in Brooklyn, New York to Noah Hunt Schenck and Ann Pierce Pendleton.

Schenck attended Columbia University and was one of the first female graduates. In Paris she studied under Aubertin.

In March 1914, Schenck and Mead established an architectural firm. They completed some country houses in New York and New Jersey, a neighborhood center for children, and the Ellen Wilson Memorial Homes in Washington, DC. They were awarded first honor for their concept of a neighborhood center for the Bronx by the Chicago City Club in March 1915.

Schenck died of pneumonia on April 29, 1915, at New York Hospital. Mead retained the name Schenck and Mead for several years after Schenck's death.
