= Bridgeport Islamic Community Center =

Mosque in Bridgeport, Connecticut

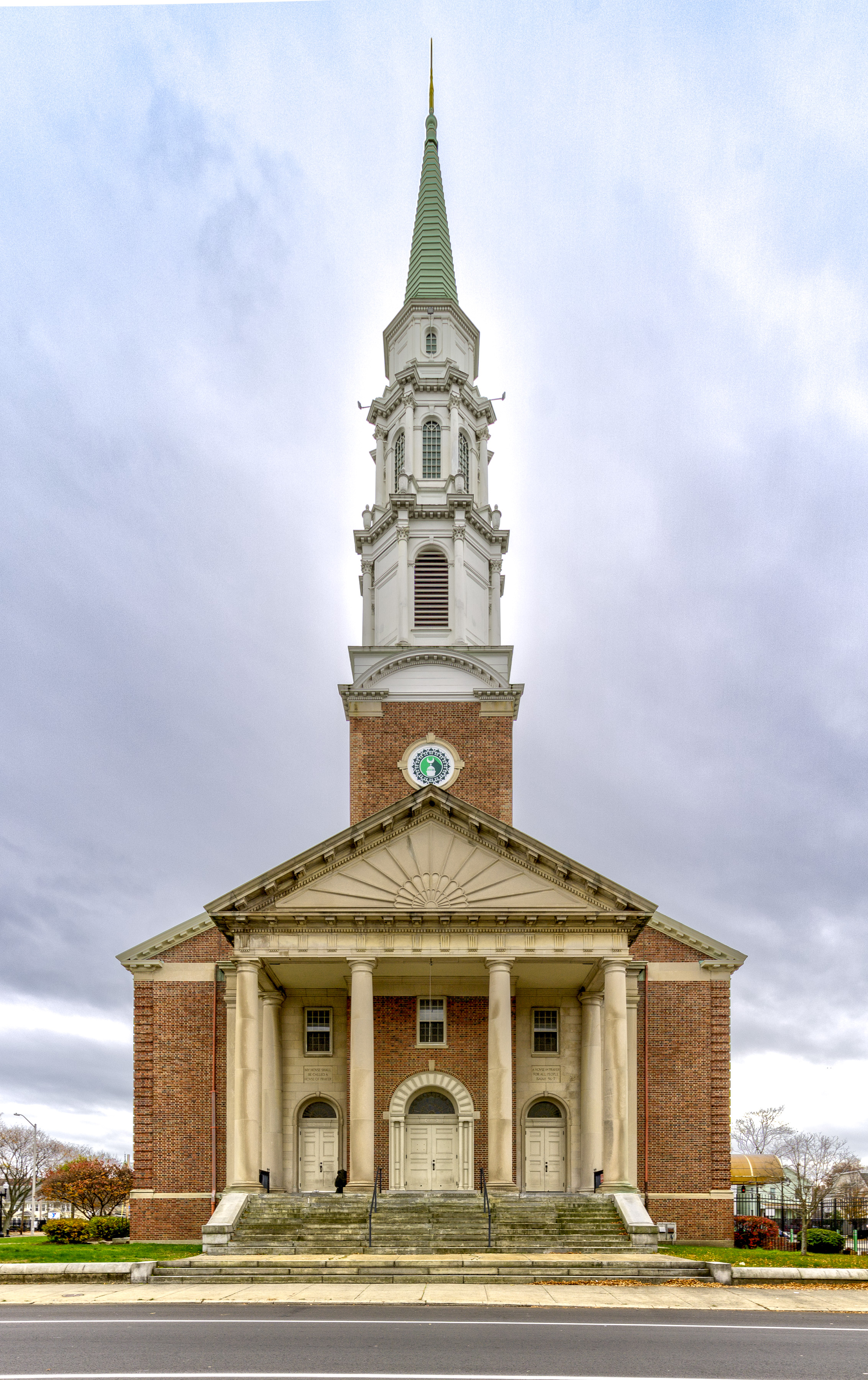

Religion
- Affiliation: Islam

Location
- Location: 703 State Street, Bridgeport, Connecticut
- Interactive map of Bridgeport Islamic Community Center
- Coordinates: 41°10′30″N 73°12′00″W

Architecture
- Architects: Allen & Collens
- Style: Colonial Revival
- Completed: 1926

U.S. National Register of Historic Places
- Added to NRHP: July 19, 1984
- NRHP Reference no.: 84000822

Website
- https://www.mybicc.org

The Bridgeport Islamic Community Center is a religious center serving the Muslim population in the greater Bridgeport, Connecticut area. Founded in 2002, it is located at 703 State Street in the city's west end, in a former Congregational Church built in 1926. The building is listed on the National Register of Historic Places for its architecture and association with its former congregation, whose history dates to the 17th century. The center provides educational, support, and outreach services to the community.

== History ==
The Bridgeport Islamic Community Center was incorporated in 2002, having its origins in educational programs begun in 2000 and held in facilities provided by the University of Bridgeport. It purchased the present building in 2017.

== Building architecture ==
The center's building is a locally notable example of Colonial Revival architecture, and was one of the last churches built in the city before the advent of the Great Depression. It was designed by the New York City firm Allen & Collens, which was better known for its Gothic Revival works. It was built for the reunited North and South Congregational Church congregations, which had split the area's 1695 congregation over doctrinal differences in the 19th century. The building is a two-story brick structure, with a symmetrical facade facing State Street. The three-bay facade has a projecting cast stone portico which has fluted columns and pilasters rising to a decorative frieze and pediment with sunburst pattern. Each bay has a doorway on the ground floor, set in a round-top archway. A multistage tower rises above the facade, with a rectangular clock section in brick at the base, and octagonal sections rising above to a spire.

== See also ==
- United Congregational Church (Bridgeport, Connecticut)
