= Park Apartments (Bridgeport, Connecticut) =

- U.S. National Register of Historic Places
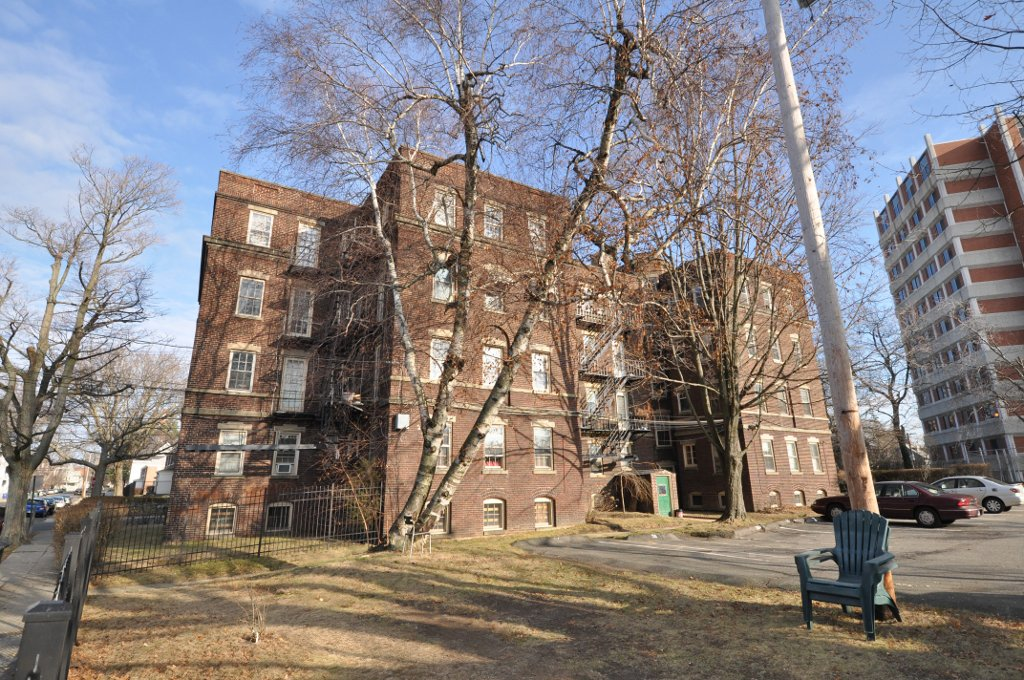

- Location within Connecticut Location within the United States
- Location: 59 Rennell Street, Bridgeport, Connecticut
- Coordinates: 41°09′39″N 73°11′40″W
- Area: less than one acre
- Architect: Lucas,Herbert
- Architectural style: Colonial Revival
- MPS: Wartime Emergency Housing in Bridgeport MPS
- NRHP reference No.: 90001427
- Added to NRHP: September 26, 1990

The Park Apartments are a historic apartment building at 59 Rennell Street in Bridgeport, Connecticut. Built in 1916 during the First World War, it was the first development of the Bridgeport Housing Corporation, established to provide emergency housing for workers in the city's war-related industries. The building was listed on the National Register of Historic Places in 1990.

== Description and history ==
The Park Apartments stand in Bridgeport's South End, adjacent to the campus of the University of Bridgeport at the southwest corner of Atlantic and Rennell Streets. It is an H-shaped four-story brick building, set on a high foundation and covered by a flat roof obscured by a low parapet. Most windows are topped by capped cast-stone lintels; those on the fourth floor are capped by simpler lintels that lie just below the building cornice. A course of moulded cast stone separates the third and fourth floors. The main building entrance is flanked by Doric columns and topped by a fanlight.

The apartment house was built in 1916 under the auspices of the Bridgeport Housing Company, and was designed by local architect Herbert Lucas. It is believed to be the earliest extant example of a large-scale apartment building in the city. It was built to house workers in the city's war-related industries, and is reflective of what was the city's single largest period of growth. Lucas, writing in American Architect, used the building as an example of the benefits of providing modest worker housing to a local economy.

== See also ==
- National Register of Historic Places listings in Bridgeport, Connecticut
