= Railroad Avenue Industrial District =

Historic district in Connecticut, United States

- U.S. National Register of Historic Places
- U.S. Historic district
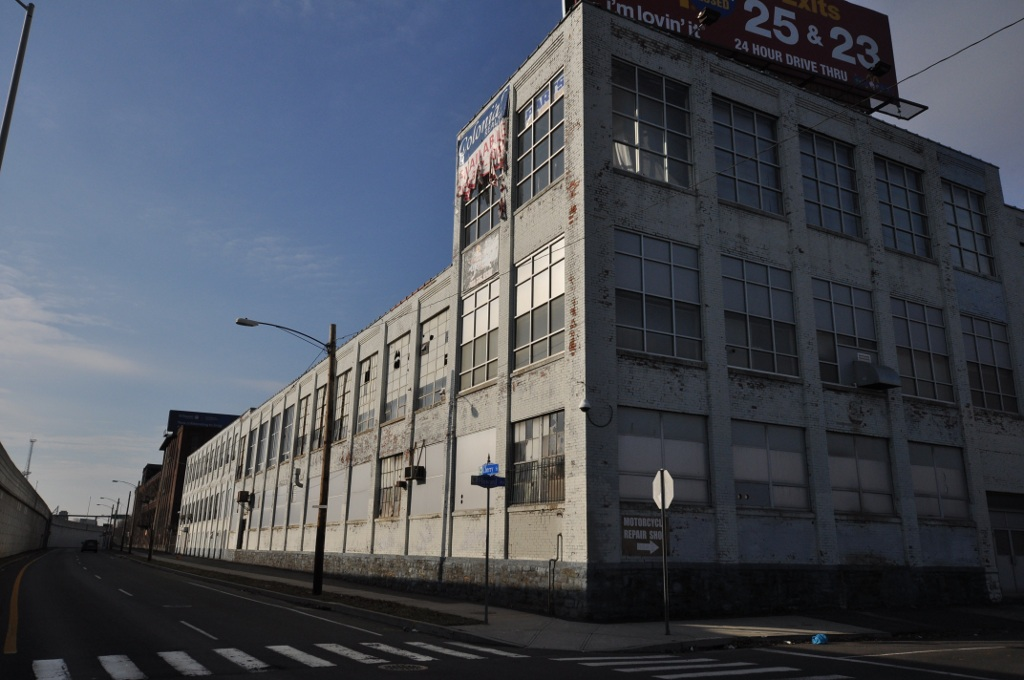
- The former American Graphaphone Company plant in 2013

- Location within Connecticut Location within the United States
- Location: Roughly bounded by State and Cherry Streets, Fairfield and Wordin Avenues, Bridgeport, Connecticut
- Area: 50 acres (20 ha)
- Architectural style: Romanesque
- NRHP reference No.: 85002697
- Added to NRHP: September 30, 1985

The Railroad Avenue Industrial District is a historic industrial area on the west side of Bridgeport, Connecticut. It extended along both sides of Railroad Avenue between Fairfield Street and Wordin Avenue, and was roughly bounded on the north by State Street and the south by Cherry Avenue. It was listed on the National Register of Historic Places in 1985, then featuring multiple industrial complexes dating to the late 19th and early 20th centuries. Since then, most of these complexes have been demolished as part of urban renewal, leaving only a handful of buildings south of Railroad Avenue.

The principal defining feature of the district today is the viaduct carrying the railroad tracks of the Northeast Corridor. Faced in large granite blocks and rising to a height of 15 feet (4.6 m) above the surrounding area, the viaduct was probably built in the 1890s, when the corridor was widened from two to four tracks and many grade-level crossings were eliminated. Railroad Avenue runs as a pair of one-way streets on either side of the viaduct, and developed beginning in the 1880s as one of the city's major industrial areas. Industrial concerns in this area manufactured all manner of goods, including typewriters, organs, sewing machines, tableware, and corsets. The area declined along with Bridgeport's economic fortunes in the 1930s, and had by the late 20th century become a vacant and blighted introduction to the city when approached from the east. Urban renewal activities of the late 20th and early 21st centuries resulted in the demolition of many of the buildings, with the properties repurposed to other commercial, industrial activities. Only one major complex, that of the former American Graphaphone Company, now survives to some degree as a residential property.

== See also ==
- National Register of Historic Places listings in Bridgeport, Connecticut
