= Marcia Mead =

American architect (1879–1967)

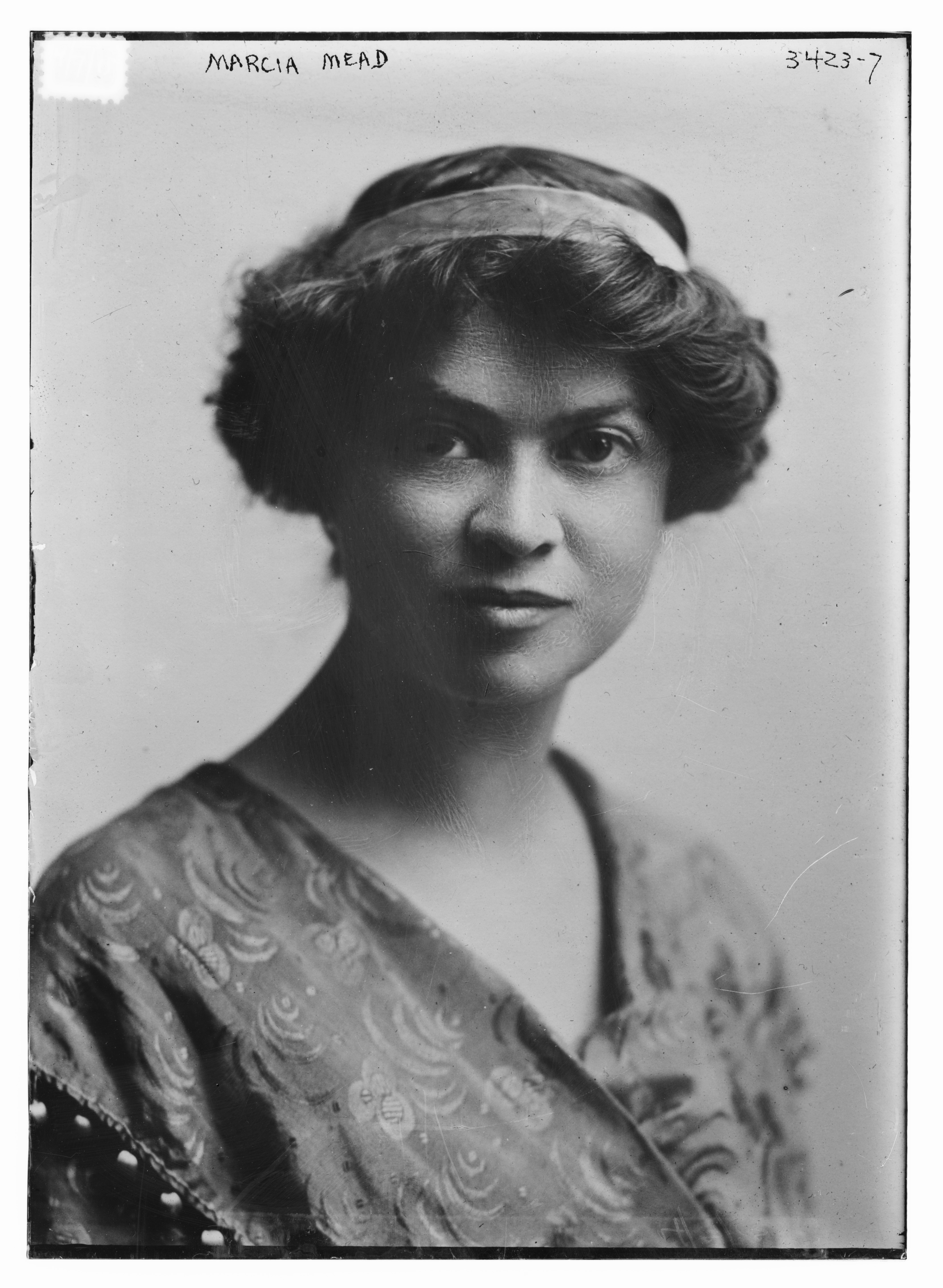
- Born: 1879; Pittsfield, Pennsylvania, U.S.
- Died: 1967 (aged 87–88); Los Angeles, California, U.S.
- Education: Columbia University
- Occupation: Architect
- Practice: Schenck & Mead (1914–1915)

Marcia Mead (1879–1967) was an early 20th century American architect known for taking a neighborhood-centered approach to the design of low-cost housing. With Anna P. Schenck (1874–1915), she was a partner in the firm of Schenck & Mead, which was acclaimed in 1914 as the first team of women architects in America but was actually formed later than both Gannon and Hands and the partnership of Florence Luscomb and Ida Annah Ryan. Schenck died early in their partnership, after which Mead pursued a solo career.

== Education ==
Marcia Mead was born in Pittsfield, Pennsylvania, in 1879, and in 1898 she received a degree from the State Normal College in Edinboro. She went on to the School of Architecture at Columbia University and in 1913 became the first woman to graduate from that program. Around this time, she worked for the university's superintendent of buildings and grounds, and she also placed among the top ten finalists in a contest to design structures for a piece of land in Chicago. Although Mead's plan wasn't ultimately chosen, it was featured in promotional literature.

Anna Pendleton Schenck was born on January 8, 1874, and studied architecture privately before gaining work as a draftsperson with various New York architectural firms.

== Career ==
Mead and Schenck may have begun working together as early as 1912. When they formed the partnership of Schenck & Mead in early 1914, they were (incorrectly) hailed by the New York Times as the first firm of women architects in America; that milestone had actually been set two decades earlier by Gannon and Hands. After Mead and Schenck opened their offices in midtown Manhattan, their first commissions included a summer home and a bungalow-style residence. Their main interest, however, lay in designing housing that was practical for women, modern tenements for the poor, and neighborhood developments for the working classes. They planned to work from "the feminist side" of things, giving priority to matters like closets, clothes chutes, and water pumps that they felt made a world of difference in women's lives but were often neglected by male architects. In addition, they approached community planning and design holistically, taking into account not just individual residences but also street layouts, store locations, and open space.

In 1915, Schenck & Mead won a nationwide architectural competition sponsored by the City Club of Chicago for a neighborhood center. Their proposal was for a center an area of the Bronx between Washington Bridge and Macombs Dam Park. Around the same time, they put forward a proposal for a group of model homes for the poor in Washington, D.C., to be known as the Ellen Wilson Memorial Homes after the late wife of then-President Woodrow Wilson. The plan was ambitious, comprising a playground, day nursery, laundry, small emergency hospital, communal kitchen, library, and club rooms, alongside 130 individual residences.

On April 29, 1915, just a few months after the firm won the Chicago competition, Schenck died of pneumonia. Mead continued to use the firm's name for several years while establishing a solo practice.

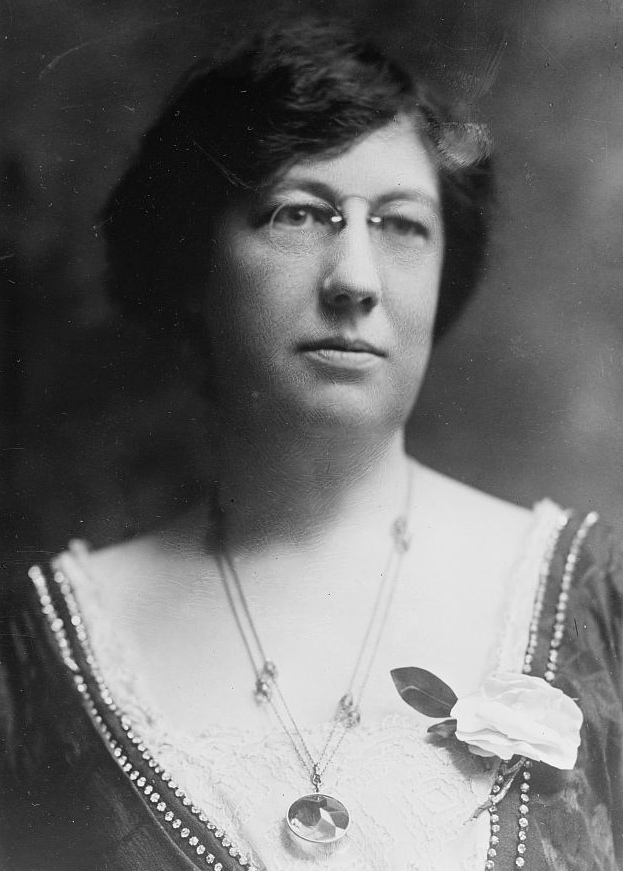
Anna Pendleton Schenck ca 1915.

One large 1917–18 project for which Mead was the lead architect was in Bridgeport, Connecticut, which had a shortage of affordable housing as a consequence of the rapid development of war-related industries like shipbuilding during World War I. A local firm, Bridgeport Housing Company, financed construction of a group of 87 one- and two-family row houses designed by Mead. The development occupied a city block and was laid out around a central playground, keeping the children away from automobile traffic. Unusually for the time, about half of the houses had a hot water system supplied from a nearby powerhouse. In discussing her design for this community housing, Mead stressed the importance of cross-ventilation and windows for light, and she paid close attention to the structure of a housewife's day since "the work of taking care of the home falls to her lot." During this project, for example, she managed to get the local standards for sink and washtub heights changed to be higher, using live demonstrations to convince officials that basins set too low strained women's backs.

In 1918, Mead became the fourth woman member of the American Institute of Architects, and in 1929 she was made a Life Member.

In 1923–24, the Canadian architect Esther Hill worked for Mead as an apprentice.

Mead died in Los Angeles in 1967.

== Legacy ==
Since 1983, Barnard College has had the Marcia Mead Design Award for undergraduate excellence in architectural design.

== Publications ==
- Mead, Marcia, ed. Small House: A Group of Homes Designed by America's Foremost Architects. New York: McCall's Magazine, 1924. (Trade catalog)
- Mead, Marcia. "The Architecture of the Small House". Architecture vol. 37 (June 1918), p. 145.
- Mead, Marcia. Homes of Character.New York: Dodd, Mead & Company, 1926.
