= East Bridgeport Historic District =

Historic district in Connecticut, United States

- U.S. National Register of Historic Places
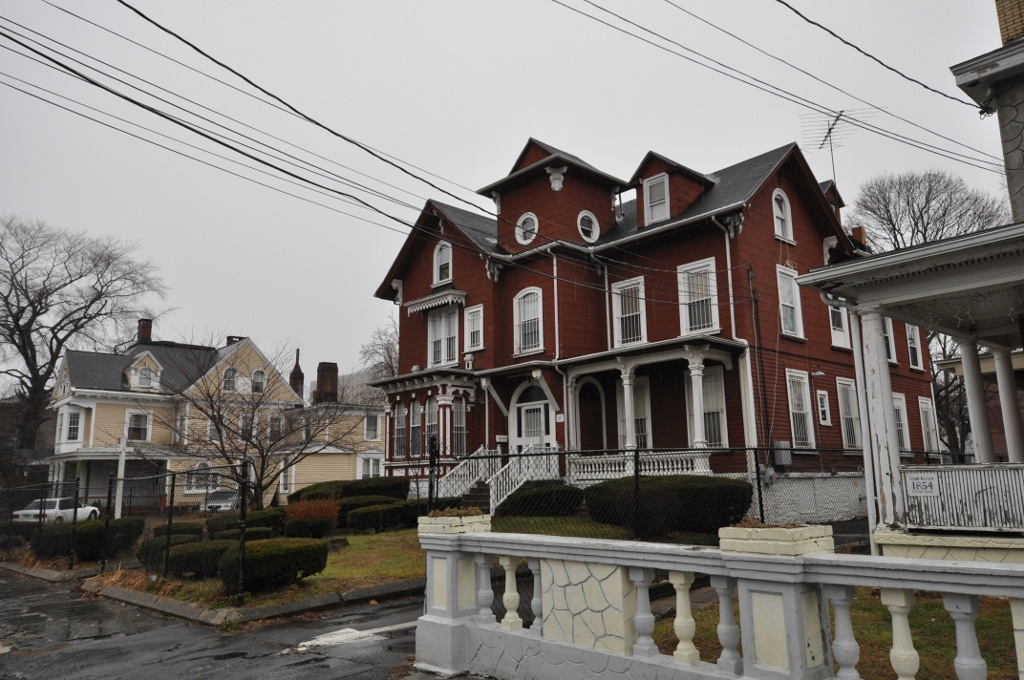

- Location within Connecticut Location within the United States
- Location: Roughly bounded by Railroad Tracks, Beach, Arctic, and Knowlton Streets Bridgeport, Connecticut
- Coordinates: 41°11′14″N 73°11′09″W
- Area: 93.8 acres (38.0 ha)
- Built: 1851
- Architect: Skaats, Abram; Multiple
- Architectural style: Greek Revival, Italianate, Queen Anne
- NRHP reference No.: 79002659
- Added to NRHP: April 25, 1979

The East Bridgeport Historic District encompasses one of the best-preserved 19th-century Neighborhoods of Bridgeport, Connecticut. Bounded by Arctic Street, East Main Street, the Railroad Tracks, and the Pequonnock River, this area was a planned development of Bridgeport promoter P.T. Barnum and landowner William H. Noble. Its development prompted the significant growth of industry and economic activity east of the Pequonnock River. The district was listed on the National Register of Historic Places in 1979.

== Description and history ==
The East Bridgeport Historic District is located roughly north of downtown Bridgeport, from which it is separated by a bend in the Pequonnock River. The area contains a well-defined rectilinear grid of streets, near whose center stands Washington Park. The waterfront areas in the western part of the district are primarily industrial in character, including 19th-century buildings dating to the period of the area's development. The area around the park is dominated by formerly high-status residences in a variety of 19th-century styles, many of which have been subsequently subdivided into multiunit housing. The other areas of the district are mainly populated by housing built for the working classes, consisting of rowhouses, tenement-style triple deckers, and smaller single family and two-family houses.

This area was developed beginning in 1851 through the efforts of showman and Bridgeport civic booster P.T. Barnum. Barnum purchased the core of the land in this area from William H. Noble, who had inherited it as farmland from his father. In addition to laying out the street grid and Washington Park, Barnum sold house lots and built a factory on the riverfront which was sold to a consortium of carriage manufacturers. Sewing machine manufacturers Wheeler & Wilson and Elias Howe also established facilities either in the district or nearby, spurring development of the area. It was estimated that the East Bridgeport area housed three-fourths of the city's manufacturing base and one quarter of its population by 1869. The area's mixed-income character, with wealthy businessmen, artisans and craftsmen, and the working class all living in close proximity, was compromised in the years after World War I, and it is now a largely working-class community. The district retains much of its original Victorian character, with generally modest or reversible alterations to building exteriors.

== See also ==
- National Register of Historic Places listings in Bridgeport, Connecticut
