= United Congregational Church (Bridgeport, Connecticut) =

Church in the United States

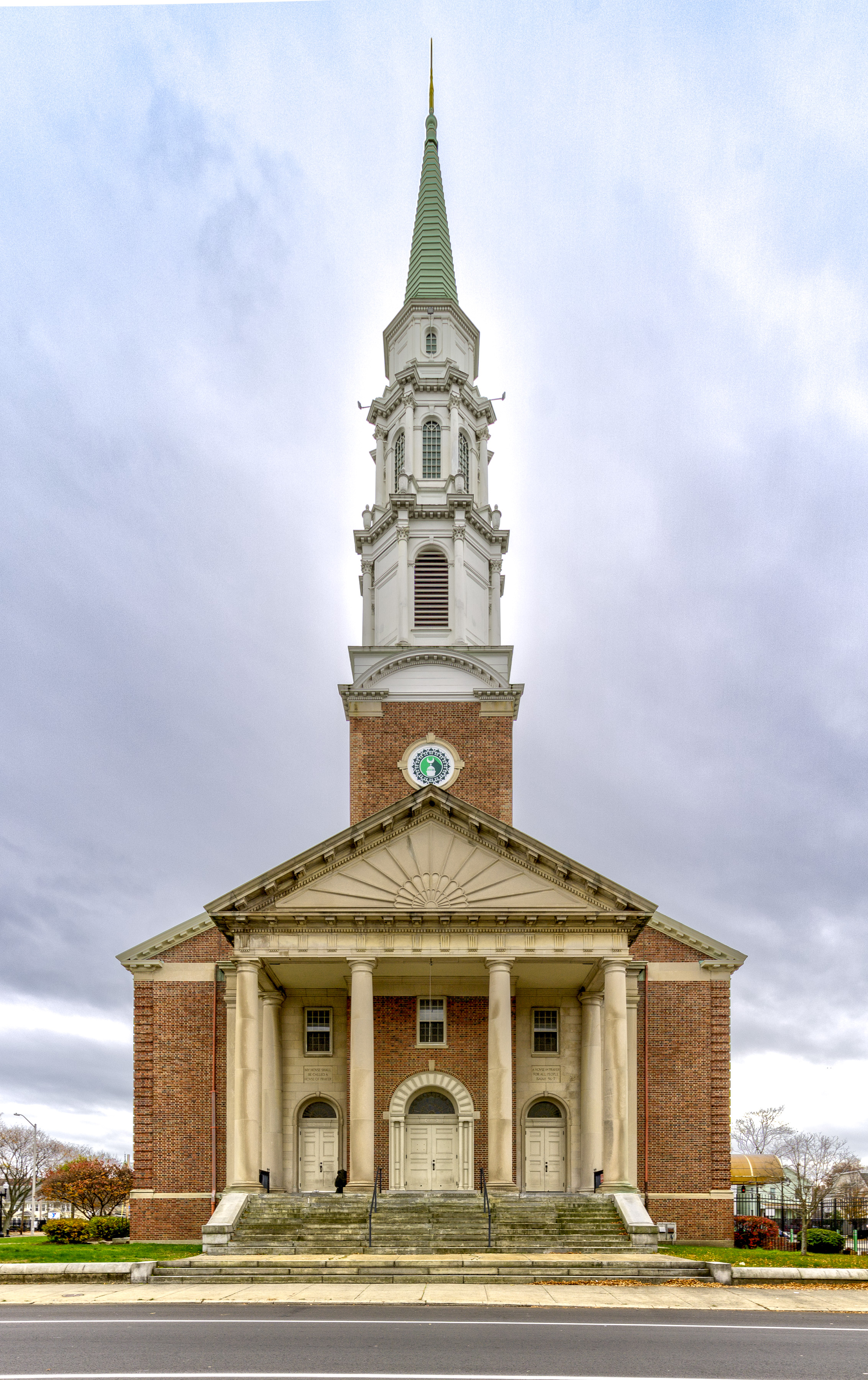
The former United Congregational Church on Park Avenue at State Street

United Congregational Church of Bridgeport – a congregation of the United Church of Christ – was gathered in 1695 by the English settlers (Pilgrims) who settled along the Pequonock (now Housatonic) River, in the area known then as Strat-field – because it was located between Fairfield and Stratford. That area is now the City of Bridgeport. Throughout its 328-year history and eight buildings, United has been a community anchor for the city. The congregation's former building at 877 Park Ave is listed on the National Register of Historic Places -- it is now home to the Bridgeport Islamic Community Center.

United founded the nOURish BRIDGEPORT, Inc. as Norma Pfriem Urban Outreach Initiatives, Inc. (NPUOI) in 2010 – nOURish is the church's not-for-profit 501(c)3 charity, which provides direct services such as a Food Pantry and Baby Center, ESL classes, Feel the Warmth Hot Meal, nOURish indoor hydroponic farm, and seasonal programs to help meet the needs of its neighbors in Bridgeport.

Today United is an active community of faith led by Senior Minister, Reverend Sara D. Smith, Esq. Its tradition of music and choral program is carried on by Mr. Tom Cuffari, the Minister of Music. United is a multi-cultural, ethnically diverse, open community.

In 2022, United Congregational Church purchased its 8th building, the Bessemer Center, at 2200 North Avenue, Bridgeport, renaming the building the nOURish Center. The building at 2200 North Ave is home for several organizations:

- United Congregational Church, Bridgeport (Building Owner)
- nOURishBridgeport - Nourish Bridgeport Inc
- Kids Empowered by Your Support, Inc.— KEYS
- ill|Connecticut Institute for Refugees and Immigrants|qid=Q132717317— CIRI
