= Division Street Historic District (Bridgeport, Connecticut) =

Historic district in Connecticut, United States

- U.S. National Register of Historic Places
- U.S. Historic district
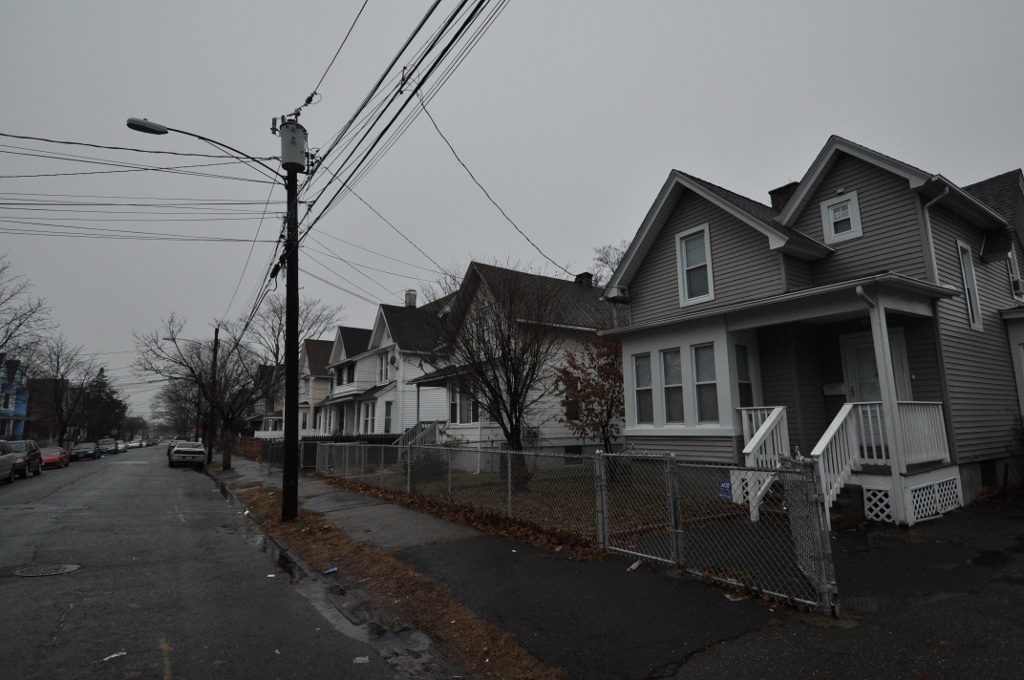
- Cottage Street view

- Location within Connecticut Location within the United States
- Location: Roughly bounded by State Street, Iranistan, Black Rock and West Avenues, Bridgeport, Connecticut
- Coordinates: 41°10′19″N 73°15′0″W
- Area: 39 acres (16 ha)
- Built: 1850
- Architect: Palliser, Palliser & Co.; Et al.
- Architectural style: Greek Revival, Gothic, Italianate
- NRHP reference No.: 82004385
- Added to NRHP: June 3, 1982

The Division Street Historic District encompasses one of the best-preserved 19th-century residential areas of Bridgeport, Connecticut. Now separated from downtown Bridgeport by the Connecticut Route 25 highway, the area includes a cross-section of 19th-century architectural styles, as well as a diversity of sophistication, from working-class accommodations to high-style Victorian mansions. The district was listed on the National Register of Historic Places in 1982.

== Description and history ==
The Division Street Historic District is located in Bridgeport's West Side-West End area, bounded roughly by State Street to the north, Iranistan Avenue to the west, Black Rock Avenue to the south, and West Avenue to the east. Much of this area was historically part of Fairfield; the area west of Park Avenue (known historically as Division Street) was annexed to the city in 1870. It was by that time already undergoing development to provide housing for the city's burgeoning workforce. The earliest worker-oriented housing predates the annexation, with Black Rock Avenue and Hanover Street already populated with worker-oriented housing by 1862.

The area from Park Street east was an enclave for some of Bridgeport's most affluent and influential residents. The surviving elements (portions were demolished during urban renewal actions of the 20th century) include a number of high-style Queen Anne Victorian houses on Park Street and West Street.

One of the city's most controversial 19th-century developments took place along Cottage and Lewis Streets, in the heart of the district. P.T. Barnum, the circus showman and city booster, sought to place a residential development on the site of an old cemetery in this area. He successfully engineered the passage of state and city legislation (during his periods of service in the state legislature and as city mayor) to make this possible. The process by which this was accomplished, and the manner in which the graves were relocated, were both high controversial. The development is also notable for the consistent use of the designs of Palliser, Palliser & Company in its construction.

== See also ==
- National Register of Historic Places listings in Bridgeport, Connecticut
