= Stratfield Historic District =

Historic district in Connecticut, United States

- U.S. National Register of Historic Places
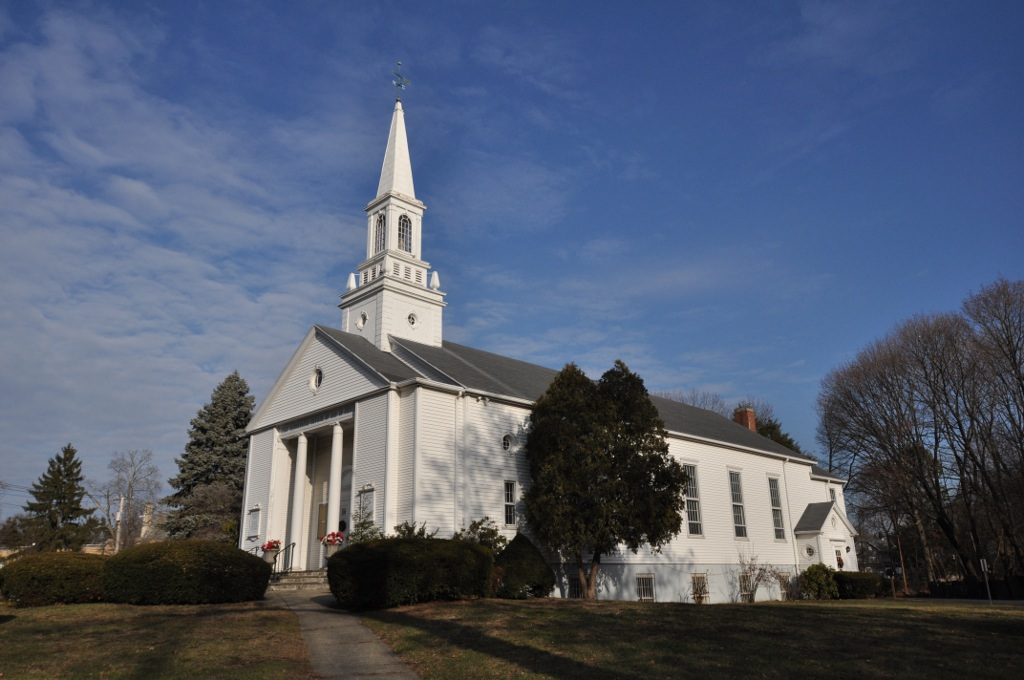
- West Parish Church

- Location within Connecticut Location within the United States
- Location: CT 59 and US 1, Bridgeport, Connecticut
- Coordinates: 41°10′40″N 73°12′49″W
- Area: 110 acres (45 ha)
- Built: 1896
- Architectural style: Late 19th And Early 20th Century American Movements, Late 19th And 20th Century Revivals, Late Victorian
- NRHP reference No.: 80004060
- Added to NRHP: June 23, 1980

The Stratfield Historic District is a historic residential area on the west side of Bridgeport, Connecticut. In the late 19th and early 20th century, it was one of the highest-status and most fashionable neighborhoods in the city. At more than 100 acres (40 ha) in size, it is one of the largest assemblages of high-status residential architecture in the state. It was listed on the National Register of Historic Places in 1980.

== Description and history ==
The Stratfield area is located on Bridgeport's west side, and is a roughly north–south district centered at the junction of North Avenue (US 1), Clinton Avenue, and Brooklawn Avenue (CT 59). It extends eastward in several places, including a complete city block bounded by Clinton, North, Laurel, and Beechwood Avenues. The area is mostly residential, with only six churches as exceptions. The majority of homes were built here between 1880 and 1920, in popular revival styles of the period. Earlier buildings include a Federal period house that was given a Queen Anne makeover in the late 19th century, and two Italianate houses dating to the 1850s, when the area was divided into country estates. The area also has some of the city's oldest surviving early history, in a small park that was once the site of a colonial militia training ground.

Bridgeport's economy grew rapidly in the second half of the 19th century, and earlier fashionable districts were overtaken by increasing urbanization. The Stratfield area was developed piecemeal by multiple developers, and was desirable for its balance between distance and proximity to the city's expanding urban core to the east.

== See also ==
- History of Bridgeport, Connecticut
- National Register of Historic Places listings in Bridgeport, Connecticut
