= Sylvester Z. Poli =

Italian-American theatre manager (1858–1937)

Sylvester Zefferino Poli (December 31, 1858 – May 31, 1937) was an Italian immigrant to the USA who became a theatre magnate during the late 19th century and early decades of the 20th century. By 1916 he controlled 30 theatres, and was heralded as the largest individual theatre owner in the world at that time, establishing himself throughout the Northeastern United States. Starting with a career in wax sculpting, he quickly moved on to dime museums, curios, variety shows, and ultimately vaudeville theatres and movie palaces.

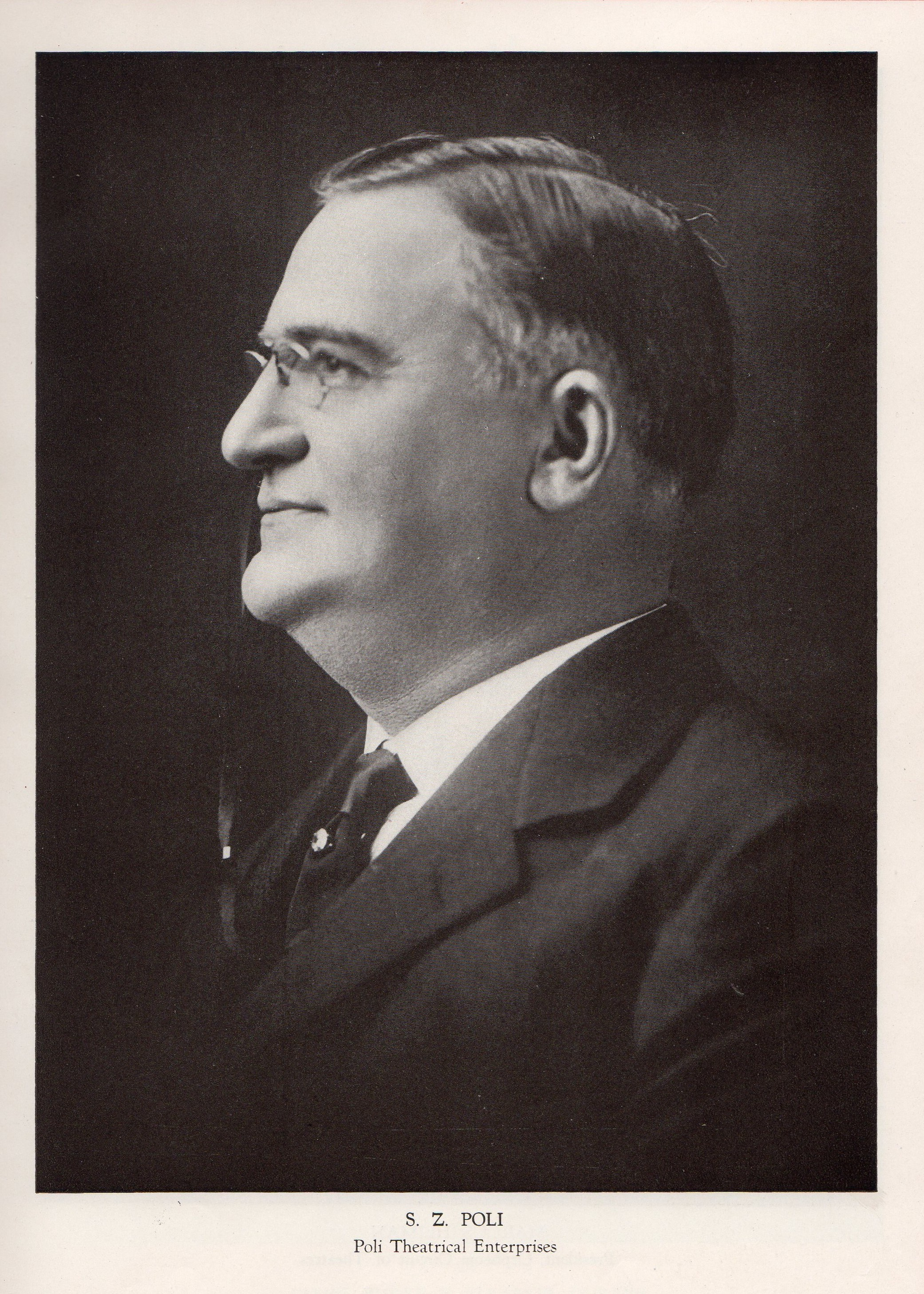
Photograph of S.Z. Poli

== Early years ==
Born in the village of Piano di Coreglia, a suburb of Lucca, Tuscany, Italy on New Year's Eve, 1858, his father was a church organist, and his mother made cakes and candies to sell. He began to show a talent for sketching and modeling at a young age, which his mother encouraged. During the Franco-Prussian War, the Poli's gave refuge to the family of noted French sculptor, and intimate friend of Napoleon, M. Dublex. Sylvester left his home at the young age of 13 to accompany Dublex back to Paris, where he would take on an apprenticeship to learn the art of modeling in clay and wax. He returned to Italy for 32 months to complete his military obligation, then went back to France to resume his studies and accept employment with the Musée Grévin in Paris. He worked with the gallery's historical wax collection becoming skilled at modeling from sketches and photographs. He modeled kings, queens, presidents, and also constructed groups like the Chambor of Horrors, "Fulton's Invention of the Steamboat", and Life of Christ.

== Moving to America ==
After several years of service with the Musee Grevin in Paris, Poli went to America in September 1881, and was employed by the Eden Musee in New York. He met his lifelong partner and wife, Rosa Leverone, there. They were married on August 25, 1885. In 1886, Poli went to work for the Egyptian Museum in Philadelphia as chief modeler. While seven anarchists were under sentence of death for participation in the Haymarket Riots in Chicago, Poli secured permission from the authorities, and families of the prisoners, to reproduce them in wax using their real clothes. He opened a store show with these figures, and then took to the road giving exhibitions in various cities. In 1888, he made the decision to open a permanent museum.

== Building an empire ==
In 1888, Poli formed a partnership and opened a combination of museums and theatres in Toronto, Canada, Rochester NY, and Staten Island. Eventually, he went solo in Troy, New York. In 1892, he settled in New Haven, Connecticut, and opened the Poli Eden Musee. Deciding he needed a bona fide theatre where he could stage continuous "high class vaudeville" shows, he built Poli's Wonderland Theatre in 1893. From 1897 until 1926, Poli continued to build theatres, in Waterbury, Bridgeport, Meriden and Hartford Connecticut, in Springfield and Worcester, Massachusetts, in Jersey City, NJ, in Wilkes-Barre and Scranton, PA, and Washington, D.C. The growing success of his business seemed to parallel the industrial expansion in Northeastern cities. Some cities had as many as three theatres, and Poli would often rebuild the same theatre two to three times, to stay competitive. Poli went through a period without rivals until B.F. Keith gained a powerful circuit. Wherever one began to advertise, the other would soon follow suit. After much wasted energy, the two agreed to stay out of each other's way. Poli sold all properties pertaining to the Keith feud except Jersey City.

== Family ==
Sylvester Poli married Rosa Leverone (1/17/1869-1/5/1960) from Genoa, Italy in 1885. He taught her the meticulous art of needling into the wax figures hairs for the head and beard. In later years, while Sylvester was busy with his theatres, Rosa supported important community and philanthropic causes. She was a prominent figure with the Veterans of Foreign War, and also received the Italian Cross of Honor from Queen Elena of Italy. They had five children together; Edward (10/12/1891-11/11/1922), Adelina (7/19/1889-11/13/1966), Juliette (6/21/1897-4/1/1976), Laurina (10/1/1899-1/26/1978), and Lillian (4/3/1903-12/16/1976). Poli built the Villa Rosa Terrace(named after his wife) in Woodmont, Milford, Connecticut, consisting of the main house, and ten (10) waterfront cottages, which he gave to their children. The family would spend summers together at the Villa Rosa enjoying lavish parties. He also purchased winter homes for each of the girls, with the exception of Lillian (Lily), who would go on to marry Marquis Lippi Gerini, and move back to Italy with her new husband. Poli spent much time preparing their son, Edward, to take over the business in 1923. However, in November 1922, the son contracted appendicitis and although the surgery was performed successfully, an embolism occurred and Edward died on 11 November. Overwhelmed with grief, Poli had a marble mausoleum erected in their son's memory in St. Lawrence Cemetery, West Haven, CT.

== Retirement ==
When Poli retired at the age of 70, he had amassed over 20 theatres, three hotels (including the Savoy in Miami), 500 offices and two building sites. In July 1928, Poli sold to Fox New England Theatres, retaining 3/4 interest and creating Fox-Poli's. With the stock market crash of 1929, Fox went into receivership in 1932. Poli regained control and in May 1934, Loew's Theatres purchased the remaining theatres, which became known as Loew's-Poli New England Theatres. Sylvester Poli spent his final years at his summer home, the Villa Rosa in Woodmont, CT. He died on May 31, 1937, at the age of 78 due to pneumonia.

== Anecdotes ==
George M. Cohan – Poli was bargaining with the Four Cohans for a return engagement. Young George M. Cohan felt that their act was worth more than S.Z. felt his theatre could pay. After much haggling, the Cohans agreed to go on for the old salary. During that performance, Cohan's parents were in the audience celebrating their 25th wedding anniversary. The house lights were raised and ushers came down the aisle carrying an elaborate silver serving set. The service was presented to the elder Cohans, with congratulations from the Poli's. After the show, S.Z. and Rosa gave a reception for them. George asked S.Z. why he had made such a fuss over their salary, as the anniversary gift and party cost far more than the increase he had wanted. S.Z. replied, "George, the salary was business, the gift is friendship."

Al Jolson first appeared for Poli in New Haven, CT as part of a trio, "Jolson, Palmer and Jolson". S.Z. suggested that Jolson might do better as a single act in blackface. Jolson went out on his own to stardom.

== Quotes ==
Sylvester Z. Poli a.k.a. The Grand Old Monarch

About being born at 10:00PM on New Year's Eve: "I was a year old, two hours after I was born."

About his shows: "Always, and at all times, I have been a strong believer in morality. I have insisted always on clean shows, and have never tolerated anything that could be fairly regarded as unfit for public presentation."

Some of the reasons for his remarkable success: "And like the shoemaker, who sticks to his task, I have never run to strange channels; I have remained always a showman. My attention, my resources, my investments, my capacities have been kept always in the theatrical groove. I have sought neither diversion nor profit outside the theatrical field. Possibly to that fact of concentration I owe, as much as to anything, what success has come to me in the theatrical profession.

From the New Haven Civic Improvement Committee representing the Italian-American voice: "Our race has found a sure refuge behind the Stars and Stripes, and we feel that among all her sons who are striving to carry this banner to victory, none will bring enthusiasm and more steadfast loyalty than her sons of Italian blood."

== Chronology ==
(completion dates and names may vary)

- 1892 – Poli's Eden Musee – New Haven, CT
- 1893 – Poli's Wonderland Theatre – New Haven, CT Vaudeville
- 1897 – Poli's – Waterbury, CT
- 1901 – Poli's Plaza – Bridgeport, CT
- 1903 – Poli's – Hartford, CT
- 1904 – Poli's – Springfield, MA
- 1905 – Palace Theatre – New Haven, CT (first from the ground up)
  - Poli's – Worcester, MA (1912 renamed Plaza)
  - Poli's – Jersey City, NJ
- 1906 – Poli's – Meriden, CT
- 1907 – Poli's – Scranton, PA
  - Bijou Theatre – New Haven, CT
- 1908 – Poli's – Wilkes-Barre, PA
- 1909 – Garden Theatre – Waterbury, CT
  - The Grand – Worcester, MA Hanover Theatre for the Performing Arts
- 1912 – Poli's – Worcester, MA
  - Poli's – Washington, DC
  - Poli's – Bridgeport, CT
- 1913 – The Strand – Waterbury, CT
  - Poli's Palace – Springfield, MA
  - The Palace – Hartford, CT
- 1914 – Poli's (Hyperion) – New Haven, CT
- 1918 – The Lyric – Bridgeport, CT
- 1920 – Capitol Theatre – Hartford, CT
- 1922 – Poli's Palace – Waterbury, CT Thomas W. Lamb, Architect
  - Poli's Majestic – Bridgeport, CT Thomas W. Lamb, Architect
  - Poli's Palace – Bridgeport, CT Thomas W. Lamb, Architect
- 1924 – Poli's Palace – Meriden, CT
- 1926 – Poli's Palace – Worcester, MA

== The players ==
Harry Houdini, Shirley Booth, Bert Lahr, Jimmie Durante and Eddie Jackson, Mae West, Georgie Jessel, George Burns and Gracie Allen, Jack Benny, Edgar Bergen, Ray Bolger, Bill "Bo Jangles" Robinson, Will Rogers, Sophie Tucker, Eva Tanguay, Theda Bara, Fred Allen, Baby Rose Marie, and the list goes on. Poli also had his own summer stock company, The Poli Players, with performers like Clara Blandick and Izetta Jewel and Doris Eaton Travis.

== Recognition & associations ==
Chevalier of the Crown of Italy by King Victor Emmanuel of Italy

The New Haven Civic Improvement Committee

Poli Theatrical Enterprises, President

General Central Committee, N.V.A. Benefit Fund Campaign
