= List of shipwrecks in 1974 =

The list of shipwrecks in 1974 includes ships sunk, foundered, grounded, or otherwise lost during 1974.

table of contents
1974
Jan	Feb	Mar	Apr
May	Jun	Jul	Aug
Sep	Oct	Nov	Dec
Unknown date

== January ==
=== 1 January ===
List of shipwrecks: 1 January 1974
Ship	State	Description
Transocean III	United States	The drilling rig sank 100 nautical miles (190 km; 120 mi) east of the Orkney Islands, United Kingdom. All 56 crew were rescued.

=== 7 January ===
List of shipwrecks: 7 January 1974
Ship	State	Description
HDMS Fremad V	Royal Danish Navy	The tug capsized and sank at Fredrikshavn whilst towing HDMS Herluf Trolle (Royal Danish Navy) with the loss of two of her crew.

=== 16 January ===
List of shipwrecks: 16 January 1974
Ship	State	Description
Jadestone Glory	United Kingdom	The 102.2-foot (31.2 m), 179-ton trawler hit a submerged rock off Roney Point, County Wexford, Ireland (52°34′N 6°12′W). Later refloated and sold for scrap.
John and Olaf	United States	The 161-gross register ton, 79.9-foot (24.4 m) fishing vessel experienced icing during a gale in Portage Bay and washed up on rocks in Jute Bay (57°32′30″N 155°51′00″W) on the south coast of the Alaska Peninsula in Alaska. Her entire crew of four perished.
Merc Enterprise	Denmark	The coaster sank off the south coast of Devon, United Kingdom with the loss of eight crew.
Prosperity	Cyprus	The cargo ship struck La Conchée reef, broke in half and was wrecked west of Guernsey, Channel Islands. All eighteen crew were lost.

=== 19 January ===
List of shipwrecks: 19 January 1974
Ship	State	Description
Nhật Tảo	Republic of Vietnam Navy	Battle of the Paracel Islands: The Chi Lang II-class patrol boat was sunk by an anti-tank missile fired by No. 389 ( People's Liberation Army Navy) There were 37 survivors from her 104 crew.
No. 389	People's Liberation Army Navy	Battle of the Paracel Islands: The Type 6610 minesweeper was shelled and damaged in the Paracel Islands by South Vietnamese ships and was beached to prevent sinking. Refloated, repaired and returned to service.

=== 22 January ===
List of shipwrecks: 22 January 1974
Ship	State	Description
USS Raymond	United States Navy	The decommissioned John C. Butler-class destroyer escort was sunk as a target off the coast of Florida.

=== 26 January ===
List of shipwrecks: 26 January 1974
Ship	State	Description
Star of Shaddia	Cyprus	The 4,033-ton cargo vessel was wrecked 35 nautical miles (65 km) south of Zubair Island in the Red Sea.

=== 27 January ===
List of shipwrecks: 27 January 1974
Ship	State	Description
Captayannis	Greece	Captayannis in 2006 The cargo ship was wrecked in the Firth of Clyde, Scotland. Her 30 crew were rescued by Rover (United Kingdom). Captayannis was on a voyage from East Africa to Greenock, Renfrewshire, United Kingdom.

=== 29 January ===
List of shipwrecks: 29 January 1974
Ship	State	Description
Hedwig Lünstedt	West Germany	The coaster capsized and sank in the English Channel with the loss of all eight crew.

=== Unknown date ===
List of shipwrecks: Unknown date January 1974
Ship	State	Description
Batavia Road	Australia	The tourist boat struck rocks and foundered 30 kilometres (19 mi) north of Geraldton, Western Australia.
Scaldis	United Kingdom	The fishing boat foundered in the English Channel off Chesil Beach, Dorset in late January with the loss of five lives.

== February ==
=== 1 February ===
List of shipwrecks: 1 February 1974
Ship	State	Description
Irish Trader	United Kingdom	Irish Trader in 2008 The motor coaster was stranded off Baltray, County Louth, Ireland (53.43°N 6.15°W), inward from Sharpness for Drogheda with fertilizer.

=== 3 February ===
List of shipwrecks: 3 February 1974
Ship	State	Description
Collette	United States	The 16-gross register ton, 43.8-foot (13.4 m) fishing vessel sank south of Spruce Cape (57°49′15″N 152°20′00″W) on Alaska′s Kodiak Island.

=== 4 February ===
List of shipwrecks: 4 February 1974
Ship	State	Description
Suzanna II	United States	The motor vessel sank in Kachemak Bay in Cook Inlet on the south-central coast of Alaska.

=== 9 February ===
List of shipwrecks: 9 February 1974
Ship	State	Description
Gaul	United Kingdom	The factory ship sank in the Barents Sea off Norway. All 36 crew were lost.

=== 10 February ===
List of shipwrecks: 10 February 1974
Ship	State	Description
Tania	Cuba	The vessel stranded on the Corona del Tingo rocks (22°46′N 83°58′W). Declared a constructive total loss.

=== 13 February ===
List of shipwrecks: 13 February 1974
Ship	State	Description
Normar	United States	The 95-foot (29.0 m) shrimp-fishing vessel iced, capsized, burned, and sank in the Shelikof Strait less than 20 nautical miles (37 km; 23 mi) from Jute Bay (57°32′30″N 155°51′50″W) on the coast of the Alaska Peninsula.

=== 15 February ===
List of shipwrecks: 15 February 1974
Ship	State	Description
Martin D	United States	The 147-gross register ton, 80.2-foot (24.4 m) tug foundered with the loss of three lives in Sumner Strait in the Alexander Archipelago in Southeast Alaska at the entrance to Wrangell Narrows when the wind blew the barge she was towing ahead of her, causing her to capsize and sink. There was one survivor.

=== 19 February ===
List of shipwrecks: 19 February 1974
Ship	State	Description
Mahiri	United Kingdom	The Empire F type coaster sprang a leak south east of Tobago. Taken in tow but capsized and sank in Gulf of Paria (10°37′N 61°34′W).

=== 22 February ===
List of shipwrecks: 22 February 1974
Ship	State	Description
Giovanna Lolli-Ghetti	Italy	The empty ore-bulk-oil carrier caught fire and a string of explosions ripped open the ten central holds. The vessel sank within three hours 900 miles (1,400 km) northeast of Hawaii (31°50′N 145°15′W). Seven sailors perished. Thirty-one survivors were rescued by Tamerlane (Norway), Novikov Priboya (Soviet Union), and USCGC Mellon (United States Coast Guard).

=== Unknown date ===
List of shipwrecks: Unknown date February 1974
Ship	State	Description
Snoqualmie	United States	The 98-foot (30 m) shrimp hauler, a former fireboat, caught fire at a fueling pier at Kodiak, Alaska, in late February. To prevent the fire from spreading, the United States Coast Guard towed her into the harbor, where she burned for 36 hours and became a total loss.
Two unidentified fishing vessels	South Korea	Two fishing vessels along with the 30 crewmen aboard them were captured by North Korean ships. North Korean coastal artillery batteries later sank the two fishing vessels with gunfire.

== March ==
=== 5 March ===
List of shipwrecks: 15 March 1974
Ship	State	Description
Lucky Debonair	United States	Last seen on 3 March near Marmot Island in Alaska's Kodiak Archipelago during a voyage from Kodiak to Cordova, Alaska, the 50-foot (15.2 m) crab-fishing vessel presumably sank during a storm on 5 March with the loss of all four people – three men and a woman – on board. The body of one of them was found on 2 June floating in Cape Chiniak Lagoon (58°31.1′N 153°52.8′W) on Afognak Island in the Kodiak Archipelago.

=== 6 March ===
List of shipwrecks: 6 March 1974
Ship	State	Description
USS Kenneth M. Willett	United States Navy	The decommissioned John C. Butler-class destroyer escort was sunk as a target off the coast of Puerto Rico.

=== 8 March ===
List of shipwrecks: 8 March 1974
Ship	State	Description
Fearless II	United States	The 32-foot (9.8 m) vessel sank in Shearwater Bay (57°20′N 152°55′W) on the south-central coast of Alaska.

=== 10 March ===
List of shipwrecks: 10 March 1974
Ship	State	Description
Oregis	United Kingdom	The support ship ran aground on the Black Midden Rocks in the Tyne Estuary.

=== 23 March ===
List of shipwrecks: 23 March 1974
Ship	State	Description
Giulia L	Panama	The coaster sprang a leak off "La Nouvelle". She was towed in to Marseille, Bouches-du-Rhône, France, where she was declared beyond economic repair. She was consequently scrapped.
Straitsman	Australia	The livestock carrier capsized and sank in the Yarra River, Melbourne, Australia, with the loss of two crew and many of her cargo of 2,000 sheep.

=== 27 March ===
List of shipwrecks: 27 March 1974
Ship	State	Description
Versa	Cyprus	The cargo ship sank off Roche Douvres, France. All sixteen crew rescued by the Guernsey lifeboat.

== April ==
=== 4 April ===
List of shipwrecks: 4 April 1974
Ship	State	Description
Aukai	United States	The Tollycraft fishing vessel was wrecked on Kayak Island in the Gulf of Alaska off the south-central coast of Alaska.

=== 8 April ===
List of shipwrecks: 8 April 1974
Ship	State	Description
USS Wickes	United States Navy	The decommissioned Fletcher-class destroyer was sunk as a target.

=== 15 April ===
List of shipwrecks: 15 April 1974
Ship	State	Description
Astra	Norway	The factory ship collided with Karonga (Singapore) off the coast of Portuguese Guinea. She sank on 17 April with the loss of a crew member.

== May ==
=== 6 May ===
List of shipwrecks: 6 May 1947
Ship	State	Description
Prawn	United Kingdom	The dredger ran aground on the Winner Bank, off Portsmouth, Hampshire, and sank. She was refloated in 1975 and scrapped.

=== 9 May ===
List of shipwrecks: 9 May 1974
Ship	State	Description
St Pierre	Canada	The coaster capsized and sank in the Lachine Canal at Montreal, Quebec, Canada.

=== 12 May ===
List of shipwrecks: 12 May 1974
Ship	State	Description
Anna Lee	United States	The barge sank in Kennedy Entrance (59°00′N 151°50′W) on the south-central coast of Alaska below Cook Inlet during a storm.
Knik Wind	United States	The tug was lost while being carried as cargo aboard the barge Anna Lee (United States) when Anna Lee sank in Kennedy Entrance (59°00′N 151°50′W) on the south-central coast of Alaska below Cook Inlet during a storm. Knik Wind later was salvaged.

=== 16 May ===
List of shipwrecks: 16 May 1974
Ship	State	Description
Master Deviedem	Soviet Union	The tanker sank after colliding with a French ferry 21 nautical miles (39 km; 24 mi) north of Tunisia.

=== 19 May ===
List of shipwrecks: 19 May 1974
Ship	State	Description
USS Ingersoll	United States Navy	The decommissioned Fletcher-class destroyer was sunk as a target in the Pacific Ocean off the coast of California at 33°34′8″N 118°34′7″W.

=== 24 May ===
List of shipwrecks: 24 May 1974
Ship	State	Description
USS Stockdale	United States Navy	The decommissioned Edsall-class destroyer escort was sunk as a target off the coast of Florida.

=== 26 May ===
List of shipwrecks: 26 May 1974
Ship	State	Description
Sygna	Norway	Sygna, 1974 The cargo ship ran aground at Stockton Beach, New South Wales, Australia.

== June ==
=== 1 June ===
List of shipwrecks: 1 June 1974
Ship	State	Description
Albacore	United States	The motor vessel was destroyed by fire at Pelican, Alaska.

=== 4 June ===
List of shipwrecks: 4 June 1974
Ship	State	Description
Theodore Parker	United States	The Liberty ship was scuttled 3 nautical miles (5.6 km) off Atlantic Beach, North Carolina.

=== 20 June ===
List of shipwrecks: 20 June 1974
Ship	State	Description
USS Burns	United States Navy	The decommissioned Fletcher-class destroyer was sunk as a target.

=== 23 June ===
List of shipwrecks: 23 June 1974
Ship	State	Description
Miss Alaska	United States	The 197-gross register ton motor vessel sank off Kodiak Island, Alaska.

=== 28 June ===
List of shipwrecks: 28 June 1974
Ship	State	Description
No. 863	Republic of Korea Navy	The patrol ship was sunk by three North Korean ships. 28 crewmen were killed.

== July ==
=== 1 July ===
List of shipwrecks: 1 July 1974
Ship	State	Description
Aleutian Salvor	United States	While towing log rafts, the 90-foot (27.4 m) tug burned and sank northeast of Pinta Point (57°07′12″N 133°53′20″W) near Kake, Alaska, after her engine exploded. The tug Kiowa (United States) rescued all six members of her crew.
Ketchikan	United States	While the barge was under tow by the tug Sudbury II (United States) off the Aleutian Islands, heavy seas washed 8,323 tons of oil pipe off her deck, causing her to capsize and sink.

=== 13 July ===
List of shipwrecks: 13 July 1974
Ship	State	Description
Elizabeth	United States	The 12-gross register ton, 35.8-foot (10.9 m) fishing vessel was destroyed by fire at Tenakee Springs, Alaska.

=== 16 July ===
List of shipwrecks: 16 July 1974
Ship	State	Description
Millie M	United States	The 27-foot (8.2 m) vessel burned and sank near Kodiak, Alaska.
Northfield	United States	The tanker ran aground off Bombay, India. She was on a voyage from Beaumont, Texas to Bombay. Consequently scrapped.

=== 21 July ===
List of shipwrecks: 21 July 1974
Ship	State	Description
Cloy E	United States	The tug sank near Marshall, Alaska.
TCG Kocatepe	Turkish Navy	Turkish invasion of Cyprus: The Gearing-class destroyer was sunk in the Mediterranean Sea off Cyprus by Turkish Air Force aircraft that mistook her for a Greek warship. Fifty-four of her crew were lost.

=== 23 July ===
List of shipwrecks: 23 July 1974
Ship	State	Description
Libby No. 9	United States	The 60-foot (18.3 m) fishing vessel sank in Veta Bay (55°21′N 133°39′W) in Southeast Alaska near Craig, Alaska, with the loss of one life. Another fishing vessel rescued her five survivors.

=== 24 July ===
List of shipwrecks: 24 July 1974
Ship	State	Description
Skagway Helen	United States	The gillnetter was destroyed in Lynn Canal near Haines, Alaska, by a fire that started in a cook stove.

=== 29 July ===
List of shipwrecks: 29 July 1974
Ship	State	Description
Emmonak	United States	The fish processing barge broke away from her moorings and sank in the Bering Sea approximately 25 nautical miles (46 km; 29 mi) off the coast of Alaska near Savoonga on Saint Lawrence Island.

== August ==
=== 1 August ===
List of shipwrecks: 1 August 1974
Ship	State	Description
Tula	United States	The motor vessel was wrecked at Unga Island in the Shumagin Islands in Alaska.

=== 2 August ===
List of shipwrecks: 2 August 1974
Ship	State	Description
Skippy Jack	United States	The motor vessel sank at the mouth of Resurrection Bay (58°57′N 152°15′W) on the south-central coast of Alaska.

=== 3 August ===
List of shipwrecks: 3 August 1974
Ship	State	Description
Kabbarli	Cambodia	Caught fire after being hit by a rocket on 21 July 1974, reached its destination of Phnom Penh, sank due to the weight of fire fighting water onboard

=== 8 August ===
List of shipwrecks: 8 August 1974
Ship	State	Description
Eagle	United States	The 37-foot (11.3 m) motor vessel burned and sank 18 nautical miles (33 km; 21 mi) southeast of Yakutat, Alaska.
Rainbow	Cyprus	The vessel ran aground in the Guadalquivir river. Sold for scrap in situ.

=== 9 August ===
List of shipwrecks: 9 August 1974
Ship	State	Description
Metula	Netherlands Antilles	The tanker ran aground in the Strait of Magellan. Subsequently refloated, declared a total loss and scrapped.

=== 11 August ===
List of shipwrecks: 11 August 1974
Ship	State	Description
Produce	Norway	The tanker ran aground off Durban, South Africa. All 33 crew were rescued.

=== 12 August ===
List of shipwrecks: 12 August 1974
Ship	State	Description
Caribia	Greece	The loss of Caribia The ocean liner ran aground at Guam and was wrecked.
Crystal S	United States	The 199-gross register ton fishing vessel capsized and sank in the Bering Sea approximately 3.5 nautical miles (6.5 km; 4.0 mi) northwest of Akutan Island in the Aleutian Islands.

=== 22 August ===
List of shipwrecks: 22 August 1974
Ship	State	Description
USS Thorn	United States Navy	USS Thorn being sunk. The decommissioned Gleaves-class destroyer was sunk as a target in the Atlantic Ocean approximately 75 nautical miles (139 km; 86 mi) east of Jacksonville, Florida, by aircraft from the aircraft carrier USS Saratoga (United States Navy).

=== 26 August ===
List of shipwrecks: 30 August 1974
Ship	State	Description
Alexander Ramsey	United States	The Liberty ship was scuttled 3 nautical miles (5.6 km) off Wrightsville Beach, North Carolina.

=== 30 August ===
List of shipwrecks: 30 August 1974
Ship	State	Description
Otvazhny	Soviet Navy	The Kashin-class destroyer exploded and sank in the Black Sea with 24 casualties.

=== Unknown date ===
List of shipwrecks: Unknown date August 1974
Ship	State	Description
Keta	United States	The 7-gross register ton pump-jet vessel was destroyed by fire at Haines, Alaska.

== September ==
=== 2 September ===
List of shipwrecks: 2 September 1974
Ship	State	Description
Nuage de Matin	United Kingdom	The yacht sank off Gorey Castle, Jersey, after she broke from her moorings.

=== 3 September ===
List of shipwrecks: 3 September 1974
Ship	State	Description
Mark F	United States	The logging barge became disabled in high winds near Whittier, Alaska, and sank after her cargo of logs broke loose.

=== 5 September ===
List of shipwrecks: 5 September 1974
Ship	State	Description
Morning Cloud	United Kingdom	The yacht was sunk by a large wave while sailing from Cowes to Burnham-on-Crouch, England, with the loss of two of her seven crew members.

=== 7 September ===
List of shipwrecks: 7 September 1974
Ship	State	Description
Invader	United States	The trawler was sunk in a collision off Baja California (29°28′N 117°12′W).

=== 9 September ===
List of shipwrecks: 9 September 1974
Ship	State	Description
Kim	United States	The motor vessel was wrecked at Glacier Point (59°06′10″N 135°22′45″W) in Southeast Alaska near Haines, Alaska.

=== 13 September ===
List of shipwrecks: 13 September 1974
Ship	State	Description
Verona	United States	The motor vessel was wrecked on the east coast of Kodiak Island, Alaska.

=== 18 September ===
List of shipwrecks: 18 September 1974
Ship	State	Description
Martisant	(United Kingdom) Dominica	The cargo ship sank at Puerto Castilla, Honduras.

=== 19 September ===
List of shipwrecks: 19 September 1974
Ship	State	Description
Aries	United States	During a voyage from Tacoma, Washington, to the Juneau, Alaska, area, the 86-foot (26.2 m) crab-fishing vessel sank west of Anderson Island, British Columbia, Canada. Her crew of five abandoned ship in a life raft and was rescued by a Canadian fishing vessel.
Focomar	Cyprus	The coaster ran aground on Andros Island, Greece, then sank in deep water. She was on a voyage from Piraeus, Greece to Constanţa, Romania.

=== 23 September ===
List of shipwrecks: 23 September 1974
Ship	State	Description
Kaffir	United Kingdom	The VIC-type lighter was driven ashore and wrecked at Newton, Ayrshire.

=== 26 September ===
List of shipwrecks: 26 September 1974
Ship	State	Description
Transhudson	United States	The tanker ran aground on Kiltan Island, India. She was on a voyage from Ras Tanura, Saudi Arabia to Subic Bay, Philippines. Declared a total loss.

=== 29 September ===
List of shipwrecks: 29 September 1974
Ship	State	Description
Nauticus Ena	United Kingdom	The coaster collided with Thuringa (West Germany) and sank 15 nautical miles (28 km) off Ostend, Belgium.

=== 30 September ===
List of shipwrecks: 30 September 1974
Ship	State	Description
Babs	United States	The motor vessel foundered and was lost at Sullivan Rock (58°53′50″N 135°18′00″W) in Southeast Alaska.
Pep	United States	The motor vessel sank at Entrance Island (58°11′49″N 135°05′59″W) in Southeast Alaska.
USS Pettit	United States Navy	The decommissioned Edsall-class destroyer escort was sunk as a target off Puerto Rico.

== October ==
=== 4 October ===
List of shipwrecks: 4 October 1974
Ship	State	Description
Ammersee	Cyprus	The coaster was abandoned in the English Channel. She was sunk by gunfire by the frigate Le Champenois (French Navy) as a danger to shipping.

=== 5 October ===
List of shipwrecks: 5 October 1974
Ship	State	Description
Jadestone Gypsy	United Kingdom	The 102-foot (31 m), 179-ton trawler sank at dock at Milford Haven. Later refloated, repaired and returned to service after being laid up.

=== 13 October ===
List of shipwrecks: 13 October 1974
Ship	State	Description
Barge 221	United States	The 1,255-gross register ton barge sank in the Gulf of Alaska.

=== 14 October ===
List of shipwrecks: 14 October 1974
Ship	State	Description
Crescent	United States	The 24-gross register ton, 57-foot (17.4 m) motor vessel was wrecked in Totem Bay (56°28′N 133°23′W) on the coast of Kupreanof Island in the Alexander Archipelago in Southeast Alaska.

=== 15 October ===
List of shipwrecks: 15 October 1974
Ship	State	Description
Kenai	United States	While under tow to the Pacific Northwest with a cargo of fertilizer, the refrigerated barge broke away from her towing vessel during a storm and sank in 120 feet (37 m) of water off Snipe Bay (56°25′N 134°57′W) in Southeast Alaska.

=== 17 October ===
List of shipwrecks: 17 October 1974
Ship	State	Description
Helenka B	United States	The motor vessel was swamped and lost in the Gulf of Alaska off Icy Bay on the south-central coast of Alaska.

=== 18 October ===
List of shipwrecks: 18 October 1974
Ship	State	Description
Wyre Majestic	United Kingdom	The 131.9-foot (40.2 m), 338-ton trawler hit the rocks at speed at Rubha a’Mhail, Bunnahabhain, Islay, Hebrides and was wrecked, declared a constructive total loss, and abandoned (55°52′N 6°7′W).

=== 28 October ===
List of shipwrecks: 28 October 1974
Ship	State	Description
Eurabia Sun	Lebanon	The cargo ship sank off the coast of the Netherlands. All 28 crew were rescued.
Great Luck	Cyprus	The turnaround of the freighter (4,300 GRT) failed after her auxiliary diesel engine failed in a storm. The ship was moored at Scharhörn until her salvage on 17 November.

=== 29 October ===
List of shipwrecks: 29 October 1974
Ship	State	Description
HMS Whirlwind	Royal Navy	The decommissioned W and Z-class destroyer sank at her moorings in Cardigan Bay, Wales, while in use as a target ship.

== November ==
=== 1 November ===
List of shipwrecks: 1 November 1974
Ship	State	Description
Unknown	Argentina	Dirty War: The 36-foot (11 m) cabin cruiser was blown up by a limpet mine placed by "Montoneros", assassinating Federal Police General Alberto Viller and his wife, off the Asarsa Shipyard at Tigre, Argentina on the Río de la Plata.

=== 4 November ===
List of shipwrecks: 4 November 1974
Ship	State	Description
Tommy Boy	United States	The private vessel disappeared at Shelter Island in the Alexander Archipelago in Southeast Alaska with the loss of all three people on board.

=== 19 November ===
List of shipwrecks: 19 November 1974
Ship	State	Description
USS Cockrill	United States Navy	The decommissioned Edsall-class destroyer escort was sunk as a target off Florida.

=== 21 November ===
List of shipwrecks: 21 November 1974
Ship	State	Description
Roy A. Jodrey	Canada	The bulk carrier struck a buoy, then ran aground on Pullman Shoal near Alexandria Bay, New York. Efforts to save the ship failed and the vessel turned on its side before sinking at 44°20′N 75°56′W.

=== 23 November ===
List of shipwrecks: 23 November 1974
Ship	State	Description
Quicksilver	United States	The 15-gross register ton motor vessel was destroyed by fire in Ernest Sound in Southeast Alaska.

=== 24 November ===
List of shipwrecks: 24 November 1974
Ship	State	Description
Geranium	Liberia	During a voyage from Port Angeles, Washington, to Osaka, Japan, with a cargo of logs and scrap metal and a Taiwanese crew of 28, the 11,477-gross register ton cargo ship disappeared with the loss of all hands in a storm in the North Pacific Ocean approximately 80 nautical miles (150 km; 92 mi) south of Kiska in the Aleutian Islands. Seaarchers found only an empty lifeboat and a large number of floating logs.

=== 28 November ===
List of shipwrecks: 28 November 1974
Ship	State	Description
Yuyu Maru	Japan	The tanker was bombed and torpedoed by Japanese Maritime Self-Defence Force ships and Japan Air Self-Defence Force aircraft and sunk 300 nautical miles (560 km; 350 mi) off Cape Inubo.

== December ==
=== 4 December ===
List of shipwrecks: 4 December 1974
Ship	State	Description
Illex	France	The cargo ship, built as Malakoff in 1918 as a Navarin-class minesweeper for the French Navy, foundered in Bay Roberts, Newfoundland and Labrador; it was later lifted and scuttled.

=== 12 December ===
List of shipwrecks: 12 December 1974
Ship	State	Description
Zane Grey	United States	The Liberty ship was scuttled 4 nautical miles (7.4 km) south of the Oregon Inlet, North Carolina.

=== 24 December ===
List of shipwrecks: 24 December 1974
Ship	State	Description
Booya	Australia	The schooner sank in Darwin Harbour, Australia during Cyclone Tracy with the loss of five crew.

=== 25 December ===
List of shipwrecks: 25 December 1974
Ship	State	Description
HMAS Arrow	Royal Australian Navy	HMAS Arrow The Attack-class patrol boat was driven ashore and sank in shallow water at Darwin, Australia during Cyclone Tracy. Two crew killed.

=== 31 December ===
List of shipwrecks: 31 December 1974
Ship	State	Description
Koromiko	Hong Kong	The ship ran aground at the mouth of the Ganges (21°34′N 89°45′E). She was on a voyage from the Philippines to Chalna, India. Koromiko was abandoned on 9 January 1975.

== Unknown date ==
List of shipwrecks: Unknown date 1974
Ship	State	Description
A. Mackenzie	United States	The United States Army Corps of Engineers dredge was sunk in a collision at the entrance to the Houston-Galveston shipping channel. The wreck was removed two months later.
Berkshire No. 7	United States	The barge sank in Bridgeport Harbor at Bridgeport, Connecticut, in the spring of 1974 while lashed to the barges Elmer S. Dailey and Priscilla Dailey when one of them began to take on water, sank, and dragged the other two down with her.
Creteboom	Ireland	The concrete hulled hulk, an engineless former tugboat, sank in the River Moy, County Mayo sometime in 1937. Refloated sometime in 1974 and resunk.
Daniel Huger	United States	The Liberty ship was scuttled off the coast of Alabama.
Elmer S. Dailey	United States	The barge sank in Bridgeport Harbor at Bridgeport, Connecticut, in the spring of 1974 while lashed to the barges Berkshire No. 7 and Priscilla Dailey when one of them began to take on water, sank, and dragged the other two down with her.
RVNS Long Dao	Republic of Vietnam Navy	Vietnam War: The Long Dao-class landing ship was probably sunk by North Vietnamese 126th Special Naval Commandos.
Priscilla Dailey	United States	The barge sank in Bridgeport Harbor at Bridgeport, Connecticut, in the spring of 1974 while lashed to the barges Berkshire No. 7 and Elmer S. Dailey when one of them began to take on water, sank, and dragged the other two down with her.
Ridgetown	Canada	The bulk carrier was scuttled as a breakwater at Port Credit, Ontario sometime in the summer of 1974.
Southern Explorer	United States	The 87-foot (27 m) vessel sank without loss of life near Sand Point, Alaska.
RVNS Than Tien	Republic of Vietnam Navy	Vietnam War: The Long Dao-class landing ship was probably sunk by North Vietnamese 126th Special Naval Commandos.
