= Sunken barges of Bridgeport =

The Sunken barges of Bridgeport are several ships sunk in Bridgeport Harbor, Bridgeport, Connecticut:

- Berkshire No. 7 - Built in 1935 and sunk in 1974. National Register of Historic Places (NRHP) listed
- Priscilla Dailey - Built in 1929 and sunk in 1974. NRHP listed
- Elmer S. Dailey - Built in 1915 and sunk in 1974. NRHP listed
