= CSB 8022 =

US Coast Guard high endurance cutter

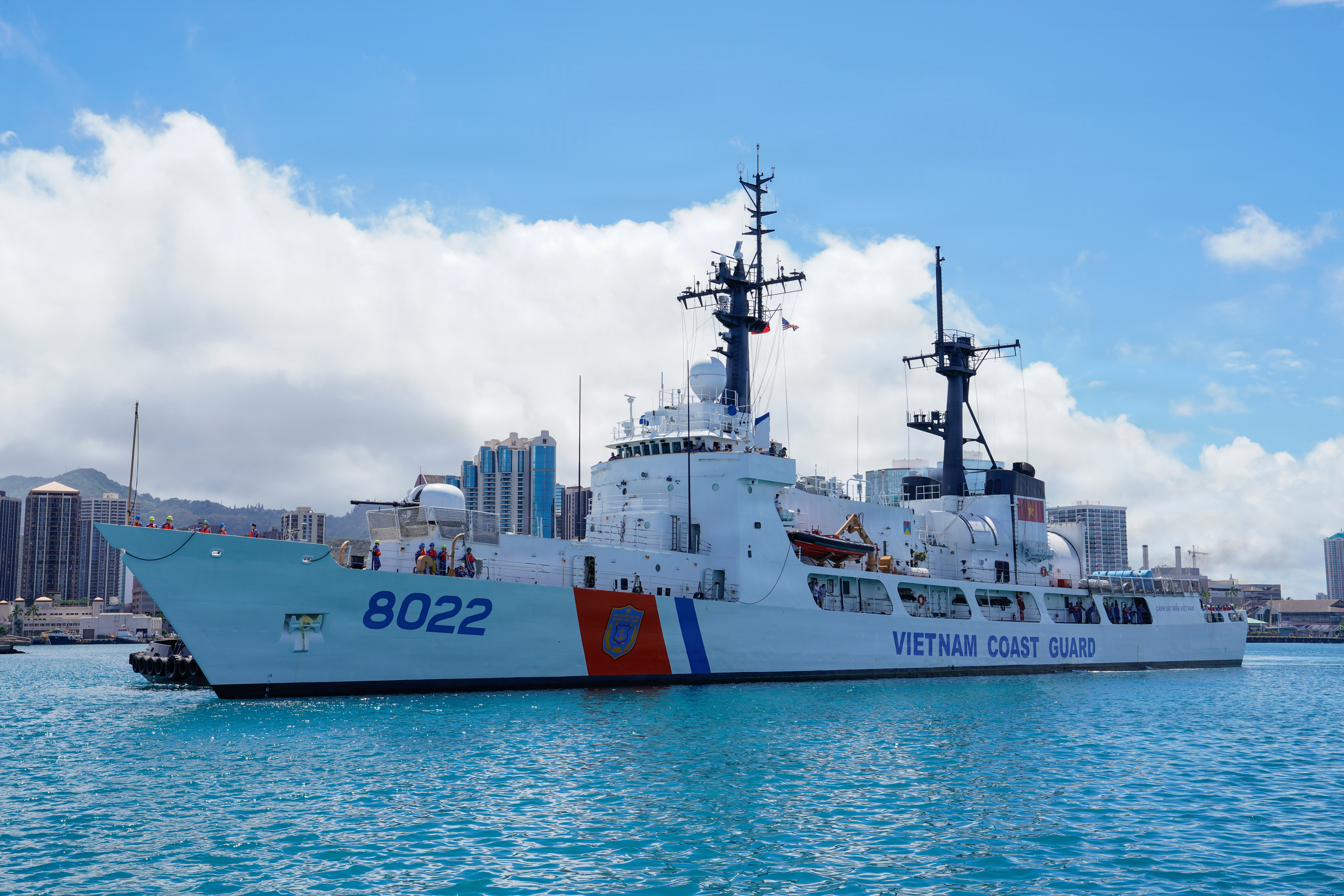
- CSB 8022 during its formal transfer, 2025.

History

United States
- Builder: Avondale Shipyards
- Laid down: 25 July 1966
- Launched: 11 February 1967
- Commissioned: 9 January 1968
- Decommissioned: 20 August 2020
- Home port: Seattle, Washington
- Identification: MMSI number: 367248000; Callsign: NMEL
- Motto: Primus inter pares; (First among equals)
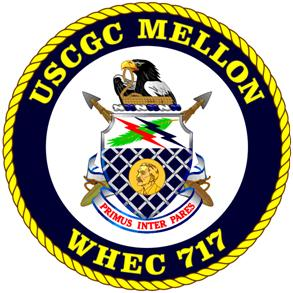
- Badge

History

Vietnam
- Name: CSB-8022
- Owner: Vietnam Coast Guard
- Acquired: 21 August 2020
- Status: In service

General characteristics
- Type: High endurance cutter
- Displacement: 3,250 metric tons
- Length: 378 ft (115 m)
- Beam: 43 ft (13 m)
- Draft: 15 ft (4.6 m)
- Installed power: 2 × 550KW GM 8-645 diesel generators; 1 × 500KW Solar Model 101506-2001 gas generator
- Propulsion: CODOG system; 2 × Fairbanks-Morse 38TD8-1/8-12 12-cylinder diesel engines generating 7,000 hp (5,200 kW) and 2 × Pratt & Whittney FT4A-6 gas turbines producing 36,000 hp (27,000 kW)
- Speed: 29 kn (54 km/h; 33 mph)
- Range: 14,000 nmi (26,000 km; 16,000 mi)
- Endurance: 45 days
- Complement: 167 and can carry up to 186
- Sensors & processing systems: AN/SPS-40E Air Search Radar; AN/SPS-78 Surface Search Radar; AN/WLR-1H Electronic Support Surveillance Equipment; MK 92 Fire Control System; TACAN
- Electronic warfare & decoys: 2 × MK 36 SRBOC launcher system
- Armament: 1 × OTO Melara Mark 75 76 mm/62 caliber naval gun; 2 × 25 mm Mk38; 1 × MK 15 Block 1 20 mm Phalanx CIWS; 6 × .50 caliber machine guns
- Aircraft carried: 1 × MH-65 Helicopter
- Aviation facilities: Flight deck and Hangar

CSB 8022 is a Vietnamese coast guard boat. She served previously as the USCGC Mellon (WHEC-717), the third United States Coast Guard Hamilton-class high endurance cutter constructed. The 2,748-ton cutter’s ocean crossing range was 10,000 miles at 20 knots.

Mellon was laid down on 25 July 1966 at Avondale Shipyards near New Orleans, Louisiana. She was named for Andrew W. Mellon, the 49th U.S. Secretary of the Treasury from 1921-1932, and launched on 11 February 1967 by Mrs. John W. Warner, Jr., sponsor and granddaughter of the late Secretary Andrew Mellon. Mellon was commissioned 9 January 1968.

Mellon was built with a welded steel hull and aluminum superstructure. She was one of the first naval vessels built with a combined diesel and gas turbine propulsion plant. Her twin screws can use 7,000 diesel shaft horsepower to make 17 knots, and a total of 36,000 gas turbine shaft horsepower to make 28 knots. The two diesel engines are Fairbanks-Morse and are larger versions of their 1968 diesel locomotive design. Her two Pratt-Whitney marine gas turbine engines are similar to those installed in Boeing 707 passenger jet aircraft. The Hamilton-class cutters were among the first American vessels to use jet aircraft-type turbines for propulsion.

She was decommissioned on 21 August 2020 and transferred to the Vietnam Coast Guard as CSB 8022, joining her sister ships Morgenthau and John Midgett.

== Operational history ==
USCGC Mellon was originally homeported in Honolulu, Hawaii. Mellon saw extensive service during the conflict in Vietnam. She was twice awarded the Meritorious Unit Commendation during the Vietnam War. During her service in the waters adjacent to Vietnam, Mellon conducted numerous naval gunfire support missions, rescue operations, medical civic action programs, and training programs for Vietnamese military personnel. In March 1970, Mellon was involved in pursuit of mutineers involved in the SS Columbia Eagle incident during the Vietnam War.

Upon returning from Vietnam, Mellon’s primary theater of operation shifted to an area of the Pacific Ocean known as "Ocean Station November." Here she performed search and rescue and oceanographic research missions. Coast Guard cutters conducting Ocean Station operations were a primary communication link for commercial aircraft making trans-oceanic flights in the era before satellite communications and satellite GPS navigation. By the mid-1970s, Mellon’s primary area of operation shifted northward to the icy waters of the Gulf of Alaska and the Bering Sea.

In February 1974, Mellon played a major role rescuing the crew of the empty Italian ore-bulk-oil carrier Giovanna Lolli-Ghetti. They survived a series of explosions, fire, and then sinking of the combination carrier within three hours. At midnight Mellon was advised of a distress call from 900 miles northeast of Hawaii. At roughly 1115 hrs the next morning, Mellon reached the area where the vessel Tamerlane (Norway) was rescuing survivors from the now deserted tanker.

The survivors transferred to Mellon for medical treatment, warm food and clean clothes. The nearby Novikov Priboy from Russia arrived to give additional medical aid. Seven of the crew were not recovered. Two survivors with severe burns were airlifted off Mellon by a USCG Sikorsky HH-52 Seaguard helicopter carried out and flown off the Australian light aircraft carrier HMAS Melbourne. The rest were taken back to Honolulu on Mellon.

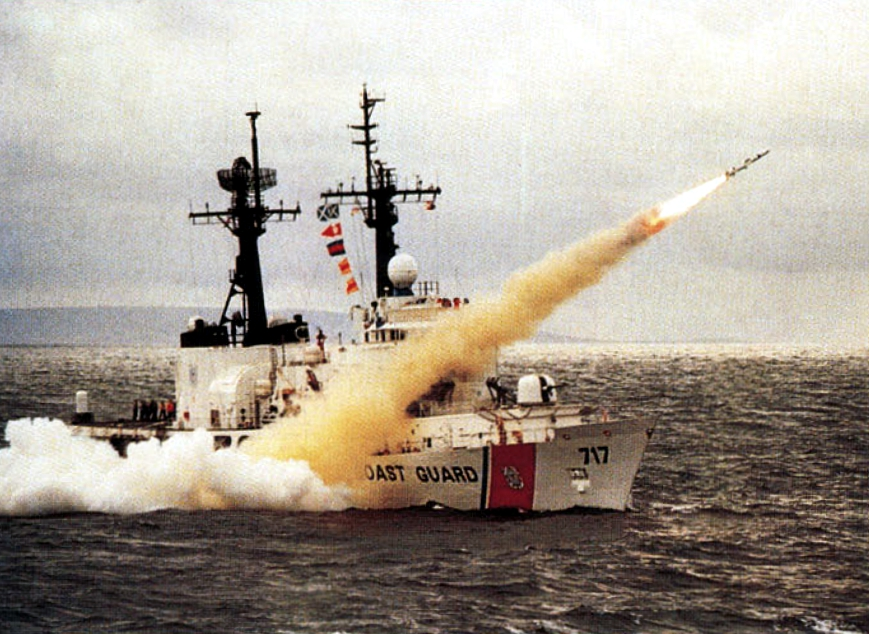
USCGC Mellon launching an RGM-84 Harpoon missile in 1990.

In October 1980, Mellon assisted in the rescue of 520 passengers and crew of the MS Prinsendam, a 427 foot long luxury cruise liner in distress in the Gulf of Alaska when fire broke out in her engine room. The vessel’s master declared the fire out of control after an hour and ordered the vessel abandoned. Most of the passengers and crew made it into lifeboats, while some were left on board. Eventually all the lifeboats and all passengers and crew were found and recovered with no deaths or serious injuries. After the rescue operations were completed, the Mellon remained on scene in a futile attempt to fight the fire that had originated in the Prinsendam engine room and progressed throughout the ship. While the Prinsendam was under tow by salvage tugs, and escorted by Mellon, the burning ship suddenly listed hard over to port and sank within a few minutes.

In 1981, Mellon moved to her new homeport of Seattle, Washington.

Mellon was modernized from 1985 to 1989 during the Fleet Rehabilitation and Modernization (FRAM) program. She and at least two other Hamilton-class cutters (Hamilton and Morgenthau) were outfitted with all-weather, over-the-horizon RGM-84 Harpoon anti-ship missiles, and test firings of the Harpoon were conducted on the Mellon in January 1990.

All Hamilton-class cutters also carried an ASW suite that was upgraded during FRAM, this included MK 32 Mod 7 Surface Vessel Torpedo Tubes, AN/SQS-38 sonar, Mk-309 Mod 0 Underwater Battery Fire Control System, and AN/SLQ-25 (NIXIE) torpedo countermeasures. After the collapse of the Soviet Union, the joint Navy/USCG board decided there was no military threat to require the installation of anti-ship missiles and anti-submarine weapons on board cutters, and subsequently removed the weapons. However the fitting and firing of Harpoons on these cutters served as a proof of capability for all Hamilton-class USCG cutters. On 21 August 2020, Mellon was retired and transferred to the Vietnam Coast Guard where she was renamed to CSB 8022.

== In popular culture ==
In the 1980 Disney film The Last Flight of Noah's Ark, the Mellon found and rescued the crew of an airplane that had been converted into a makeshift life raft.

== Gallery ==
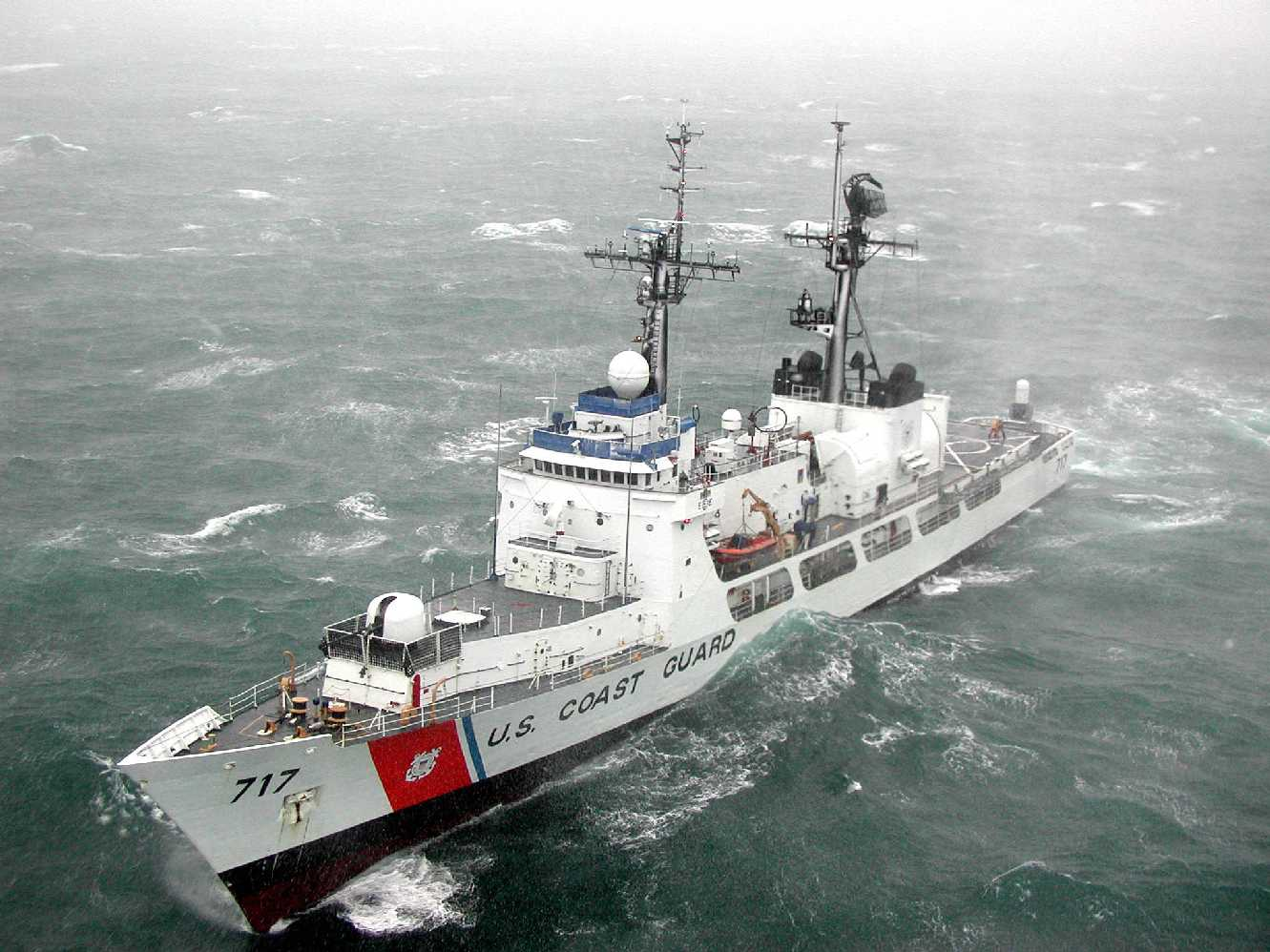
USCGC Mellon (WHEC-717) in the Bering Sea, 2001.

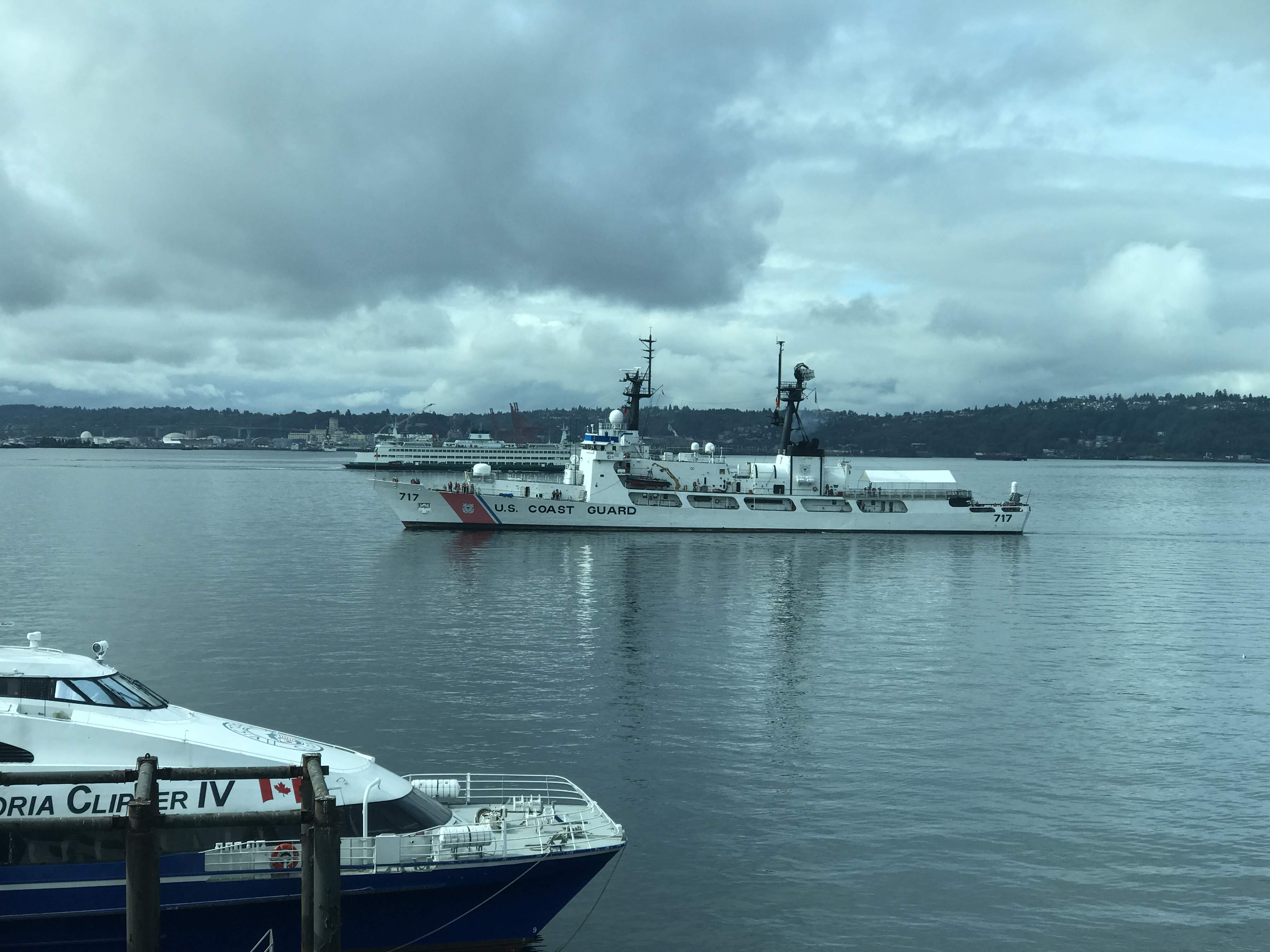
USCGC Mellon in Seattle for SeaFair Fleet Week, 2018

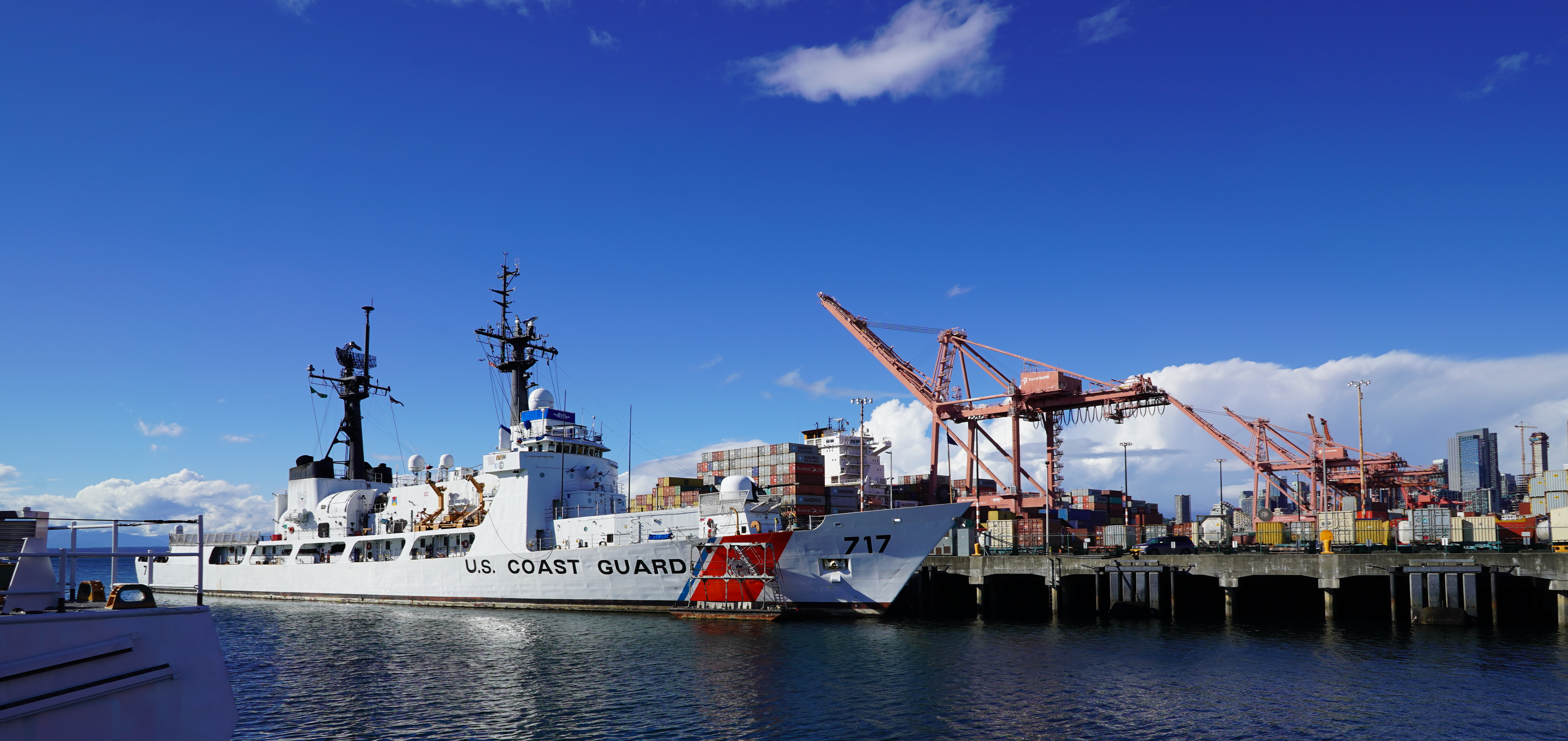
In Seattle in 2018 repainting her "Racing Stripe".
