= USS Wickes =

Two ships in the United States Navy have been named USS Wickes, in honor of Lambert Wickes.

- The first USS Wickes (DD-75) was the lead ship in her class of destroyers during World War I.
- The second USS Wickes (DD-578) was a Fletcher-class destroyer during World War II.
