= Berkshire No. 7 =

Wood and steel barge constructed in 1935

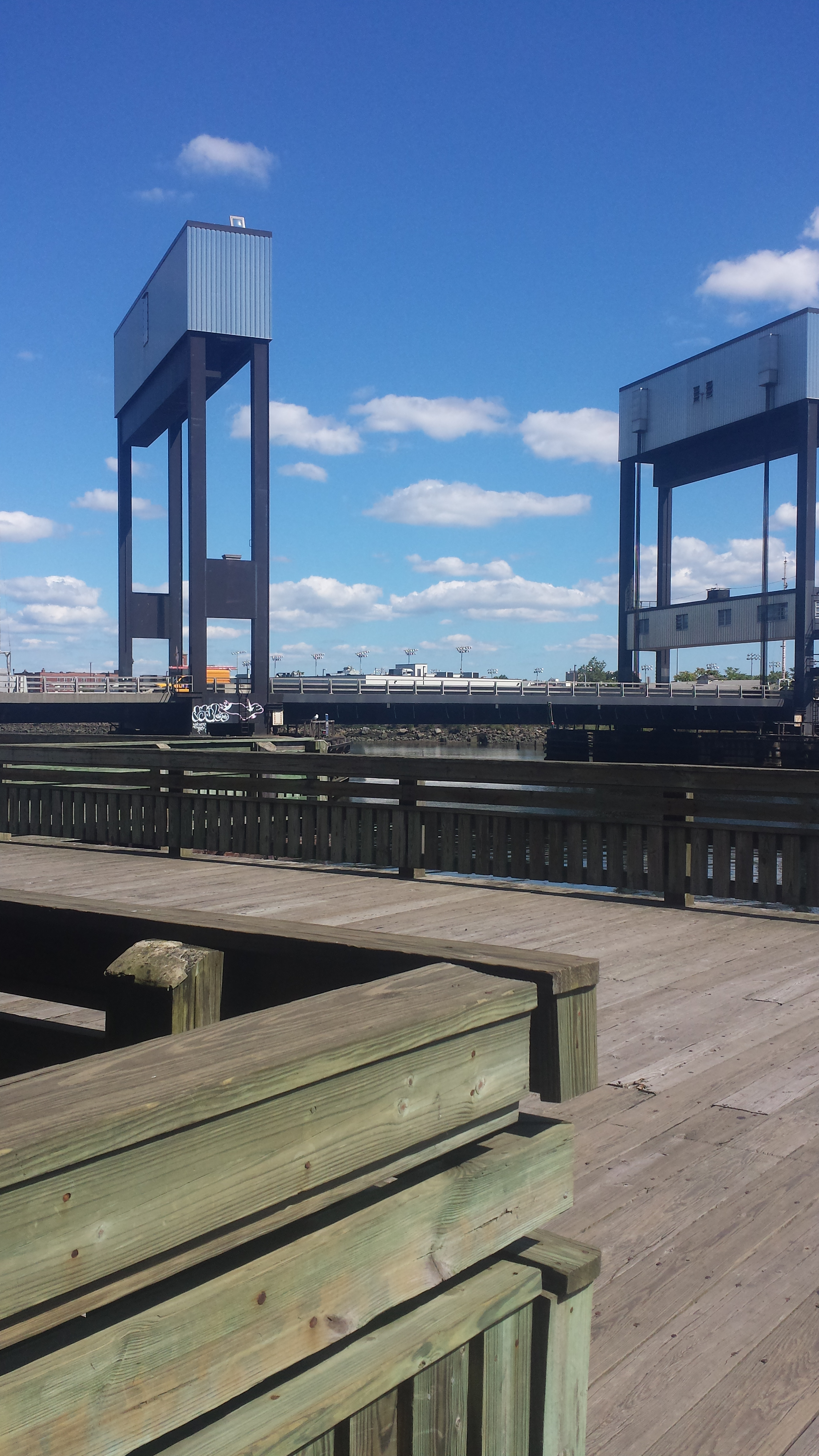
- Site of the sunken Berkshire No. 7

History
- Owner: Steward J. Dailey
- Operator: S. J. Dailey Company
- Route: Connecticut–Long Island Sound
- Ordered: 1935
- Builder: Jacobson and Peterson, Inc.
- Completed: 1935
- Out of service: 1974
- Fate: Sunk in 1974

General characteristics
- Type: Canal barge
- Tonnage: 216
- Length: 104 feet (32 m)
- Beam: 20 feet (6.1 m)
- Depth of hold: 10 feet (3.0 m)
- Berkshire No. 7
- U.S. National Register of Historic Places
- Location within Connecticut Location within the United States
- Location: Bridgeport Harbor, Bridgeport, Connecticut
- Coordinates: 41°10′42″N 73°11′14″W
- Area: less than one acre
- Built: 1935
- Architect: Jacobson, Irving
- NRHP reference No.: 78002837
- Added to NRHP: December 21, 1978

Berkshire No. 7 is a wood and steel barge constructed in 1935. It is historically important as a transitional canal barge and as one of the few surviving wooden-hulled canal boats. It was used to transport bulk cargo, including shipping fertilizer, from Connecticut to Long Island Sound. It sank in 1974 along with the Elmer S. Dailey and the Priscilla Dailey in the harbor of Bridgeport, Connecticut, on the west side of the Pequonnock River. The sunken vessel has deteriorated to the point that a salvage operation could result in breaking it apart. The Berkshire No. 7 was added to the National Register of Historic Places on December 21, 1978.

== Description ==
The Berkshire No. 7 is a small wood and steel canal barge that measures 104 feet (32 m) long with a 20 feet (6.1 m) beam. The depth of the hold is listed at 10 feet (3.0 m) and it had a listed capacity of 216 tons. It is a transitional canal barge with steel framing and wood planking over the skeleton. Clouette describes the hull as being "nearly rectangular in profile, section and plan, with squared-off stern and bluntly rounded bow. Low bulwarks with scuppers rise slightly to a peak where they join the prominently projecting stem". The superstructure is primarily of a single low coaming with convex hatch covers that runs almost the full length of the shop. A rectangular cabin rises up above the coaming and has a companionway in the rear. The Berkshire No. 7 is listed in the U.S. Registry as #172071.

== History ==
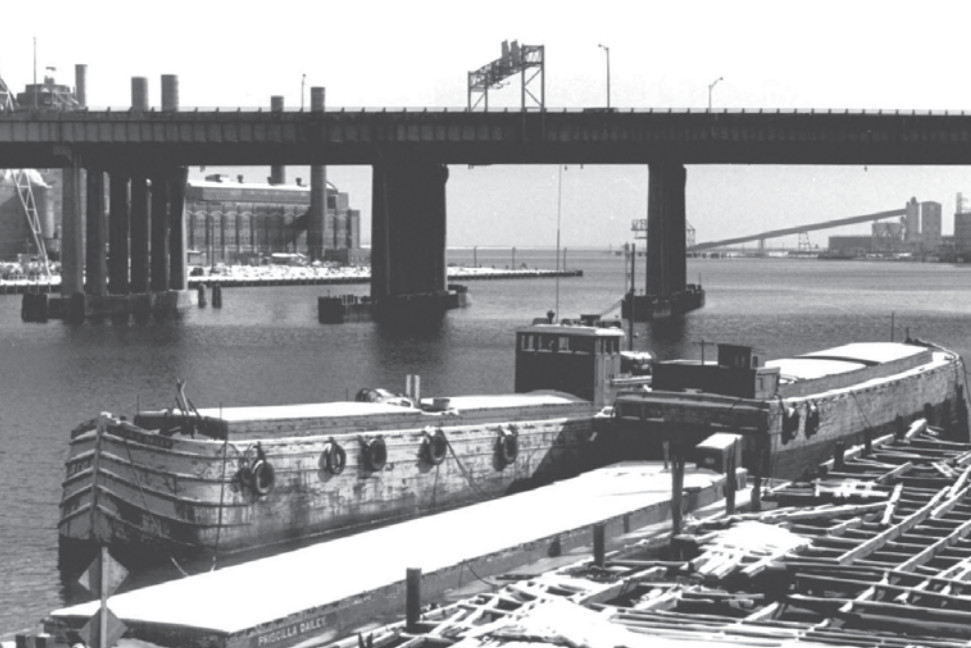
1973 image of the three barges; the Berkshire No. 7 is the one with the distinctive bow

The Berkshire No. 7 was constructed in 1935 by Jacobson and Peterson, Inc. in Brooklyn, New York, for Stewart J. Dailey, a former mule driver on the Erie Canal who later became a partner in a Tonawanda, New York, shipbuilding company and afterwards opened his own business, S. J. Dailey Company. The barge was used to ferry materials, including shipping fertilizer from Connecticut to Long Island Sound between 1941 and 1972. Afterwards it was moored in Bridgeport Harbor together with the Elmer S. Dailey and Priscilla Dailey, two other barges. In the spring of 1974, one of the barges began to take on water, dragging down the other two. No part of the Berkshire No. 7 is visible above water.

== Importance ==
The Berkshire No. 7 has historical importance because of its design, which reflects the construction of 19th-century canal boats. However, there is no record that the barge was ever used on a canal. The barge is one of two surviving wooden-hulled canal boats in existence. It was added to the National Register of Historic Places on December 21, 1978. Its nomination and listing is unusual because the Berkshire No. 7 was not yet 50 years old at the time of its nomination, and it sank in 1974. It and the other two barges that sank with it are the only shipwrecks in Connecticut listed on the National Register of Historic Places.

In 1998, the historic status of the barges was a concern for the Port Authority of Bridgeport Harbor, as the sunken ships interfered with a billion-dollar redevelopment project. Over the years, the barges had deteriorated so that a salvage operation would likely result in them breaking apart. No action had been taken by 2003, but a report noted that prior to any activity of the Berkshire No. 7, the Federal Transit Administration and/or the City of Bridgeport should document the barge with photos and a technical description. Specifics regarding the documentation based on the activity would be archived at the State Historic Preservation Office and the Mystic Seaport Museum.

== See also ==
- National Register of Historic Places listings in Bridgeport, Connecticut

== Notes ==
The New York Times article notes that the barges sunk in 1974, but inaccurately says that the ships were placed on the National Register of Historic Places "shortly before they went down". The Berkshire No.7's nomination form was produced in May 1978 and it was added on December 21, 1978. Another document relating to the Intermodal Transportation Center erroneously states the Berkshire No. 7's National Register of Historic Places listing date and that it sank because of Hurricane Gloria in 1985.
