= Elmer S. Dailey =

Wooden barge by Willian H. Follette

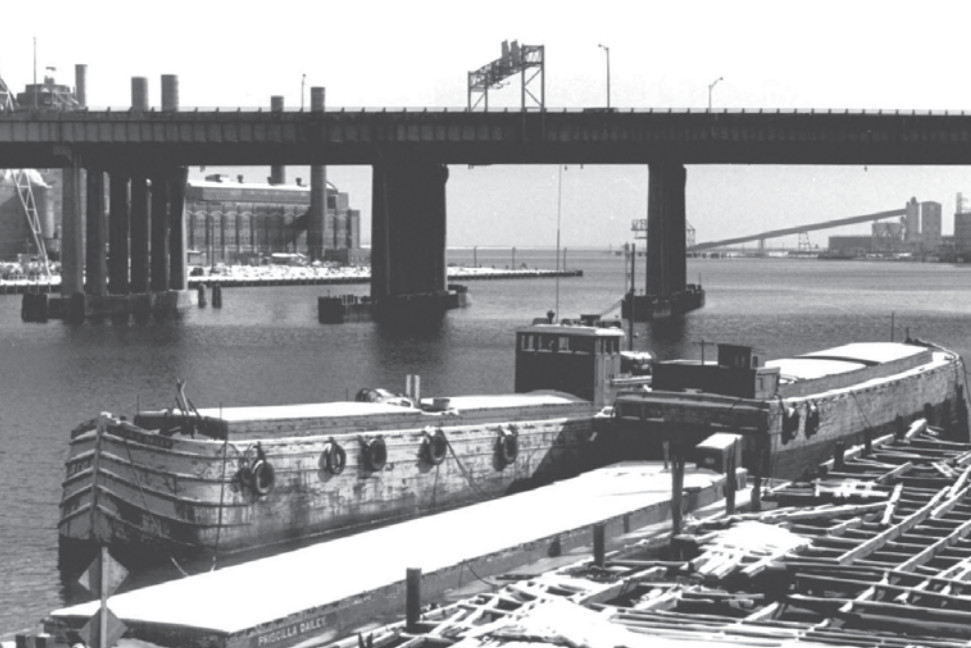
- 1973 image of the three barges; Elmer S. Dailey is the rightmost

History
- Owner: Steward J. Dailey
- Operator: S. J. Dailey Company
- Route: Connecticut–Long Island Sound
- Builder: William H. Follette
- Completed: 1915
- Out of service: 1974
- Fate: Sunk in 1974

General characteristics
- Type: Canal barge
- Tonnage: 101
- Length: 105.2 feet (32.1 m)
- Beam: 17.9 feet (5.5 m)
- Depth of hold: 9.9 feet (3.0 m)
- Propulsion: Fairbanks-Morse diesel engines
- Elmer S. Dailey
- U.S. National Register of Historic Places
- Location within Connecticut Location within the United States
- Location: Bridgeport Harbor, Bridgeport, Connecticut
- Coordinates: 41°10′42″N 73°11′14″W
- Area: less than one acre
- Built: 1935
- Architect: Follette, William H.
- NRHP reference No.: 78002837
- Added to NRHP: December 21, 1978

Elmer S. Dailey, originally known as the Claire B. Follette, is a wooden barge built by William H. Follette in 1915 at Tonawanda, New York, and rebuilt and renamed in 1928 by Brown Drydock on Staten Island, New York. It was used to transport materials from New York, New Jersey and Connecticut. It is the only known surviving Erie Canal boat and is one of a few remaining wooden-hulled canal boats. It sank in 1974 along with the Priscilla Dailey and the Berkshire No. 7 in the harbor of Bridgeport, Connecticut on the west side of the Pequonnock River. It has deteriorated to the point that a salvage operation could result in it breaking apart. It was added to the National Register of Historic Places on December 21, 1978.

== Description ==
The barge is an Erie Canal boat that has two Fairbanks-Morse in-line six-cylinder diesel engines. It measures 105.2 feet (32.1 m) long with a 17.9 feet (5.5 m) beam. The depth of the hold is listed at 9.9 feet (3.0 m) and it had a listed capacity of 101 tons.

Clouette describes the Elmer S. Dailey as having an "almost rectangular hull in section and plan, with bluntly rounded bow and stern...the bulwarks, perforated by scuppers, rise up to the stem which is slightly raked back. There are prominent strakes in the bow and topside along the sides of the vessel. A coaming about 2 feet (0.61 m) high frames the single large cargo opening which occupies about two-thirds of the boat's length". The cargo opening is covered by convex hatch covers. Towards the stern is a rectangular pilothouse and a low cabin with a companionway which has a protruding stack.

== History ==
The Elmer S. Dailey was originally known as the Claire B. Follette when it was built by William H. Follette in 1915 at Tonawanda, New York. In 1928, the ship was rebuilt by Brown Drydock on Staten Island and acquired the name Elmer S. Dailey. Brown Drydock installed two Fairbanks-Morse in-line six-cylinder diesel engines and added the pilothouse and stack. At an unspecified later date, one engine was removed and a direct-drive engine, rated at 180 or 210 horsepower, operated on compressed air. In its final configuration, the vessel was manned by a three-man crew.

The ship was owned by Stewart J. Dailey, a former mule driver on the Erie Canal who later became a partner in a Tonawanda shipbuilding company and afterwards opened his own business, S. J. Dailey Company.

The barge was used to transport materials between ports in New York, New Jersey, and Connecticut, and after the diesel engines were added, it was able to push another barge. It was in service between 1941 and 1972, and afterwards was moored in Bridgeport Harbor together with the Berkshire No. 7 and Priscilla Dailey, two other barges.

In the spring of 1974, one of the barges began to take on water, dragging down the other two. No part of the barge is visible above water. Elmer S. Dailey is listed in the U.S. Registry as #166315.

== Importance ==
The Elmer S. Dailey is historically significant because it is the only known surviving Erie Canal boat and is one of a few remaining wooden-hulled canal boats. It was added to the National Register of Historic Places on December 21, 1978. It and the other two barges that sank with it are the only shipwrecks in Connecticut listed on the National Register of Historic Places.

In 1998, the historic status of the barges was a concern for the Port Authority of Bridgeport Harbor, as the sunken ships interfered with a billion-dollar redevelopment project. Over the years, the barges had deteriorated so that an operation to salvage them would likely result in it breaking apart. No action had been taken by 2003, but a report noted that prior to any activity of the Elmer S. Dailey the Federal Transit Administration and/or the City of Bridgeport should document the barge with photos and a technical description. Specifics regarding the documentation based on the activity would be archived at the State Historic Preservation Office and the Mystic Seaport Museum.

== See also ==
- National Register of Historic Places listings in Bridgeport, Connecticut

== Notes ==
The New York Times article notes that the barges sank in 1974, but inaccurately states that the ships were placed on the National Register of Historic Places "shortly before they went down". The Elmer S. Dailey's nomination form was produced in February 1978 and it was added on December 21, 1978. Another document relating to the Intermodal Transportation Center erroneously states the Elmer S. Dailey National Register of Historic Places listing date and that it sank because of Hurricane Gloria in 1985.
