= Priscilla Dailey =

Canal boat on the National Register of Historic Places

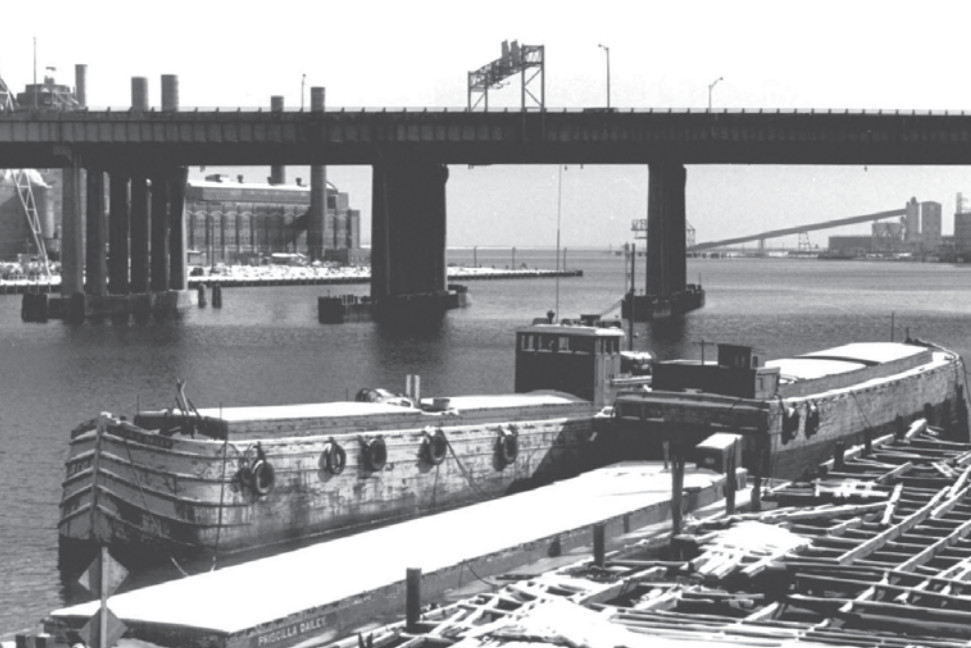
- 1937 photo of the three barges; Priscilla Dailey is in the forefront

History
- Owner: Steward J. Dailey
- Operator: S. J. Dailey Company
- Route: Connecticut–Long Island Sound
- Builder: William J. Ryan
- Completed: 1929
- Out of service: 1974
- Fate: Sunk in 1974

General characteristics
- Type: Canal barge
- Tonnage: 311
- Length: 111.1 feet (33.9 m)
- Beam: 24 feet (7.3 m)
- Depth of hold: 11.8 feet (3.6 m)
- Priscilla Dailey
- U.S. National Register of Historic Places
- Location within Connecticut Location within the United States
- Location: Bridgeport Harbor, Bridgeport, Connecticut
- Coordinates: 41°10′42″N 73°11′14″W
- Area: less than one acre
- Built: 1935
- Architect: Ryan, William J.
- NRHP reference No.: 78002837
- Added to NRHP: December 21, 1978

Priscilla Dailey, previously known as the Elizabeth E. Newell, is a wooden canal boat constructed in 1929 in Whitehall, New York. The barge was used to transport bulk cargo in New York, New Jersey, and Connecticut harbors. It sank in 1974 along with the Elmer S. Dailey and the Berkshire No. 7 in the harbor of Bridgeport, Connecticut on the west side of the Pequonnock River. The sunken boat has deteriorated to the point that a salvage operation could result in it breaking apart. It was added to the National Register of Historic Places on December 21, 1978.

== Description ==
The barge measures 111.1 feet (33.9 m) long with a 24 feet (7.3 m) beam. The depth of the hold is listed at 11.8 feet (3.6 m) and it had a listed capacity of 311 tons. Clouette describes the Priscilla Dailey as having a "nearly rectangular hull in profile, section and plan, with squared-off stern and bluntly rounded bow. Low bulwarks with scuppers rise slightly to a peak where they join the prominently projecting stem. There are several raised strakes in the bow. The superstructure consists mainly of a single low coaming which extends nearly the length of the vessel". Toward the stern is a small cabin that has the same width and height of the coaming. In 1978, the National Register of Historic Places nomination noted that the convex hatch covers likely floated away and that the squarish hood over the companionway had washed away.

== History ==
The wooden canal boat Priscilla Dailey was originally known as Elizabeth E. Newell until it was purchased by Stewart J. Dailey in 1941. It was constructed in 1929 in Whitehall, New York, by William J. Ryan for Anthony O'Boyle. The ship was built 24 years after the Champlain Canal's enlargement, but more closely resembles the specifications of the 19th-century canal boats. It was used to transport materials in New York, New Jersey and Connecticut harbors between 1941 and 1972, and afterward was moored in the harbor of Bridgeport, Connecticut together with the Elmer S. Dailey and Berkshire No. 7.

In the spring of 1974, one of the barges began to take on water, dragging down the other two. At neap tide, one-third of the hull of the Priscilla Dailey is visible above water. Priscilla Dailey is listed in the U.S. Registry as #170368.

== Importance ==
The Priscilla Dailey is historically significant because it is one of the few surviving wooden canal boats and is "a rare and representative artifact of canal transportation". Its design is characteristic of its 19th-century predecessors despite being a 20th-century vessel. It was added to the National Register of Historic Places on December 21, 1978. Its nomination and listing is unusual because it was not yet 50 years old at the time of its nomination, and it sunk in 1974. It and the other two barges that sank with it are the only shipwrecks in Connecticut listed on the National Register of Historic Places.

In 1998, the historic status of the barges was a concern for the Port Authority of Bridgeport Harbor, as the sunken ships interfered with a billion-dollar redevelopment project. Over the years, the barges had deteriorated so that an operation to salvage them would likely result in them breaking apart. No action had been taken by 2003, but a report noted that prior to any activity of the Priscilla Dailey, the Federal Transit Administration and/or the City of Bridgeport would document the barge with photos and a technical description. Specifics regarding the documentation based on the activity would be archived at the State Historic Preservation Office and the Mystic Seaport Museum.

== See also ==
- National Register of Historic Places listings in Bridgeport, Connecticut

== Notes ==
The New York Times article notes that the barges sank in 1974, but inaccurately says that the ships were placed on the National Register of Historic Places "shortly before they went down". The Berkshire No.7's nomination form was produced in May 1978 and it was added on December 21, 1978. Another document relating to the Intermodal Transportation Center erroneously states the Priscilla Dailey National Register of Historic Places listing date and that it sunk because of Hurricane Gloria in 1985.
