= Embassy Towers =

Skyscraper in Bridgeport, Connecticut, US

- Embassy Towers Bridgeport, Connecticut (cropped) Embassy Towers in 2025

General information
- Status: Completed
- Type: Residential
- Architectural style: Modern
- Location: 2625 Park Avenue, Bridgeport, Connecticut, United States
- Coordinates: 41°11′35.74″N 73°13′00.37″W
- Completed: 1964

Height
- Roof: 184 ft (56 m)

Technical details
- Floor count: 16

Embassy Towers is a 184 ft (56 m) tall modern style residential building located at 2625 Park Avenue in Bridgeport. The building has 16 floors and was built in 1964. Upon its completion, it became the tallest building in Bridgeport, surpassing the 180 ft (55 m) tall, St. Augustine Cathedral which held the title since 1868. The building would stay the tallest building in Bridgeport until 1973, when it was surpassed by the 218 ft (66 m) tall, Park City Plaza. It is now the 3rd-tallest building in Bridgeport, under Park City Plaza and the Bridgeport Center, and the tallest residential building in Bridgeport.

In 2010, the building was evacuated after a fire broke out on the tenth floor. The fire resulted in 3 injuries.

In 2020, a gas line was struck, causing a brief evacuation of the building.

== See also ==
- 1000 Lafayette Boulevard
- St. Vincent's Medical Center (Bridgeport)
- Bridgeport Hospital
- Park Apartments (Bridgeport, Connecticut)
- United States Post Office–Bridgeport Main
- P.T. Barnum Bridge
- Hotel Beach
- Remington Shot Tower
