= City Trust Apartments =

Skyscraper in Bridgeport, Connecticut, US

- City Trust Apartments Bridgeport, Connecticut downtown (cropped) City Trust Apartments in June 2026
- Interactive map of the City Trust Apartments area

General information
- Status: Completed
- Type: Mixed-use
- Architectural style: Art Deco
- Location: 955 Main Street, Bridgeport, Connecticut, United States
- Coordinates: 41°10′39.34″N 73°11′21.50″W
- Completed: 1929

Height
- Roof: 165 ft (50 m)

Technical details
- Floor count: 10

Design and construction
- Architect: Dennison & Hirons

City Trust Apartments (also known as the City Trust Building) is a 165 ft (50 m) tall art deco style mixed-use building located at 955 Main Street in Bridgeport, Connecticut. The building has 10 floors and was built in 1929. The building was designed by the New York City based architectural firm, Dennison & Hirons.

It was originally built as a office building. After the Bridgeport City Trust Company failed in 1991, it was renovated and converted into a mixed use building.

The building was put up for sale in late 2024. In 2026, it was bought by Abraham Gottesman for $21.5 million.

The building is a part of the Bridgeport Downtown South Historic District, which was listed on the National Register of Historic Places in 1987.

== See also ==
- Bridgeport Center
- 1000 Lafayette Boulevard
- Hotel Beach
- Park City Plaza
