= Barnum Museum =

History museum in Connecticut, US

The Barnum Museum

General information
- Architectural style: Byzantine, Islamic, Gothic and Romanesque influences
- Location: 820 Main Street; Bridgeport, Connecticut, United States
- Completed: 1893
- Client: P. T. Barnum

Technical details
- Structural system: Stone and terra cotta
- Size
- Barnum Institute of Science and History
- U.S. National Register of Historic Places
- U.S. National Historic Landmark
- U.S. Historic district – Contributing property
- Location within Connecticut Location within the United States
- Location: 820 Main Street, Bridgeport, Connecticut
- Coordinates: 41°10′31″N 73°11′19″W
- Part of: Bridgeport Downtown South Historic District (ID87001402)
- NRHP reference No.: 72001300

Significant dates
- Added to NRHP: November 7, 1972
- Designated NHL: December 11, 2023
- Designated CP: September 3, 1987

Design and construction
- Architect: Longstaff & Hurd
- Engineer: Longstaff & Hurd

The Barnum Museum is a museum at 820 Main Street in Bridgeport, Connecticut, United States. It has an extensive collection related to P. T. Barnum and the history of Bridgeport. The building in which it is housed was built with funding from Barnum, and initially housed the Barnum Institute of Science and History. The building is on the National Register of Historic Places, and was designated a National Historic Landmark for its association with Barnum.

The building and its exhibits are connected to a portion of Bridgeport Center, a complex of buildings completed in 1989 on the same grounds as the Barnum Museum.

== Construction ==
The building was originally contracted for construction by P. T. Barnum himself. The funds and land for the building and museum were provided by Barnum to house the work of the Bridgeport Scientific Society and the Fairfield County Historical Society. The structure was completed in 1893 and is home to the Barnum Museum today.

The three-story museum in downtown Bridgeport is constructed of stone and terra cotta with architectural influences ranging from Byzantine to Romanesque architecture. As designed, the building was to house the societies as noted above, with the first floor of the building holding commercial establishments. There is a frieze lining the top of the building by Henri Plasschaert that contains five reliefs of imagery from America's history. They are entitled "Native American (1670)", "Early Settler (1760)", "Maritime (1840)", "Civil War (1861)" and "Industrial Revolution (1870)." There are also busts interspersed among the relief panels of a Native American, Christopher Columbus, George Washington, Elias Howe, Civil War General Winfield Scott and Grover Cleveland.

== History ==
Before his death, P. T. Barnum bequeathed the sum of US$100,000 for the establishment of the structure. Completed in 1893, the building was originally called The Barnum Institute of Science and History and opened on February 18 of that year. As imagined, it originally operated as a resource library and a lecture hall, attracting industrialists including the Wright brothers and Thomas Edison to speak.

Though designed to include them, no commercial properties ever occupied the first floor of the building. This led to financial instability in the original societies that resided in the building, as it was expected that income from those interests would help support the societies. With the onset of the depression, both societies faced fiscal hardship and were forced to cease operation. In 1933, the City of Bridgeport assumed ownership of the building. In 1936, the city opened the Barnum Museum.

With the building in the hands of the city, it was closed in 1943 for remodeling. It reopened in 1946 as a city hall annex, with the third floor reserved for displaying selected collections from the now defunct societies. The building functioned in this capacity into the 1960s.

In 1965, at the urging of concerned citizens and city officials, plans were set in motion to return the building to its former status as a museum. All city offices housed in the building were removed in 1965. Subsequent to this, the building was repaired and remodeled to support renewed operations as a museum. These efforts included creating spaces to feature exhibits on the history of Bridgeport and exhibits on the life of Barnum. When re-opened as the P. T. Barnum Museum in 1968, it was staffed by employees of the City of Bridgeport.

In 1972, the building was added to the National Register of Historic Places. It was designated a National Historic Landmark in 2023, in recognition of its association with Barnum, a prominent figure in developing American cultural values in the late 19th century.

Starting in 1986, the building was managed by The Barnum Museum Foundation. The foundation is a public-private interest group with the goal of maintaining The Barnum Museum. Renovations began in the same year, costing US$7.5 million. Subsequent to renovations, the building was re-opened again in June 1989. New galleries were added detailing history related to the local industrial age and the life of P. T. Barnum. As part of the renovation, an 7,000 sq ft (650 m^{2}). addition was made to the original building to house rotating exhibitions and events.

It also included a recreation of P.T. Barnum's personal library in his former Iranistan estate and a number of other artifacts and displays of 19th Century life in Bridgeport. Also housed on the property was an exhibit devoted to Tom Thumb, one of P. T. Barnum's most famous acts. The oldest artifact owned by the museum is a 2500-year-old Egyptian mummy verified as authentic by Quinnipiac University personnel. Storms damaged many artifacts between 2010 and 2012.

In 2016, the Barnum Museum, in partnership with the Bridgeport History Center (part of the Bridgeport Public Library) was awarded a grant from the National Endowment for the Humanities to digitize a portion of their collections. The P.T. Barnum Digital Collection is hosted on the University of Connecticut's digital preservation platform, the Connecticut Digital Archive. This digital collection holds over 1,200 items that range from letters and ledgers to clothing worn by P.T. Barnum, Lavinia Warren, and Tom Thumb, as well as more unusual items such as a slice of fruitcake from Warren and Thumb's 1863 wedding. It also includes furniture from Barnum's Iranistan home that was previously displayed by the museum as a part of a recreation of his library, and a rare letterpress copybook of letters written by P.T. Barnum from 1845 to 1846 when he was touring Europe with Tom Thumb.

The museum is a member of the North American Reciprocal Museums program.

== See also ==
- History of Bridgeport, Connecticut
- Barnum's American Museum – in New York City, 1841–1865
- Hotel Barnum, also listed on the NRHP in Bridgeport
- National Register of Historic Places listings in Bridgeport, Connecticut
