= Hoffmann Architects =

American architecture and engineering firm

Hoffmann Architects, Inc.
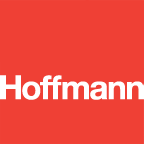

Practice information
- Key architects: John J. Hoffmann, FAIA, Russell M. Sanders, AIA
- Founded: 1977
- Location: New Haven, Connecticut; New York City; Alexandria, Virginia

Website
- hoffarch.com

Hoffmann Architects, Inc., d/b/a Hoffmann Architects + Engineers, is a private architecture and engineering firm based in New Haven, Connecticut, United States, with offices in New York City and Alexandria, Virginia. Founded in 1977 by Hungarian-born architect John J. Hoffmann, the firm specializes in the rehabilitation of the building envelope, including facades, roofs, plazas, terraces, and parking structures, as well as historic / landmark building restoration.

== History ==
Hoffmann Architects was established in 1977 by architect John J. Hoffmann and incorporated in Connecticut in 1985. In 1992, the American Institute of Architects (AIA) elevated John Hoffmann to Fellowship, in recognition of "significant contributions to architecture and to society." From 2004-2006, he served on the AIA Board of Directors as Director for the New England Region. At the conclusion of his term, the AIA awarded Hoffmann the Upjohn Fellowship, named for AIA co-founder Richard Upjohn, which "honors recipients' exemplary contributions in service of the Institute."

In July 2011, Hoffmann offered ownership stakes in the company to seven senior managers, in preparation for the continuation of the company after his retirement. In July 2013, an eighth manager became part owner of the firm. Three more team members accepted joint ownership in Hoffmann Architects in August 2016, and four more became owners in 2017. In 2022, 2023, and 2024, the number of shareholders grew, with early career professionals now joining senior staff as part of the firm's leadership. In 2018, Avi Kamrat and Russell Sanders were appointed as members of the firm's board of directors by John Hoffmann, the sole existing director.

As part of the firm's leadership transition plan, Russell Sanders assumed the role of president of Hoffmann Architects in July 2019. John Hoffmann, who was president of the company for 42 years, continues to serve on the board of directors as executive chairman.

In 2022, the firm moved its headquarters from Hamden, Connecticut, to New Haven, Connecticut, and adopted the d/b/a Hoffmann Architects + Engineers to reflect the firm's practice in both architecture and structural engineering.

== Practice ==
Hoffmann Architects + Engineers is a specialty architecture and engineering practice. Rather than design new buildings, Hoffmann investigates causes of distress and failure in existing structures and develops rehabilitation strategies. The firm's architects and engineers also provide consultation services for new construction, particularly in the areas of waterproofing, design details, structural engineering, and building envelope elements.

With an emphasis on construction technology and building science, the practice encompasses facades, including curtain walls, bearing walls, and fenestration; roofs, both low-slope and pitched; plazas and terraces over occupied space; parking structures, especially concrete and structural elements; and historic and landmark structures. The firm's client base predominantly derives from the institutional, commercial, and government sectors, including educational institutions, real estate management and investment companies, corporations, religious institutions, health care facilities, hotels, museums, libraries, and foundations. The company also specializes in exterior restoration of the works of major architects.

Most projects are in the Northeast and Mid-Atlantic regions of the US, although the firm has performed work in 34 states, as well as in Puerto Rico, Canada, the United Kingdom, and South Korea.

== Notable projects ==
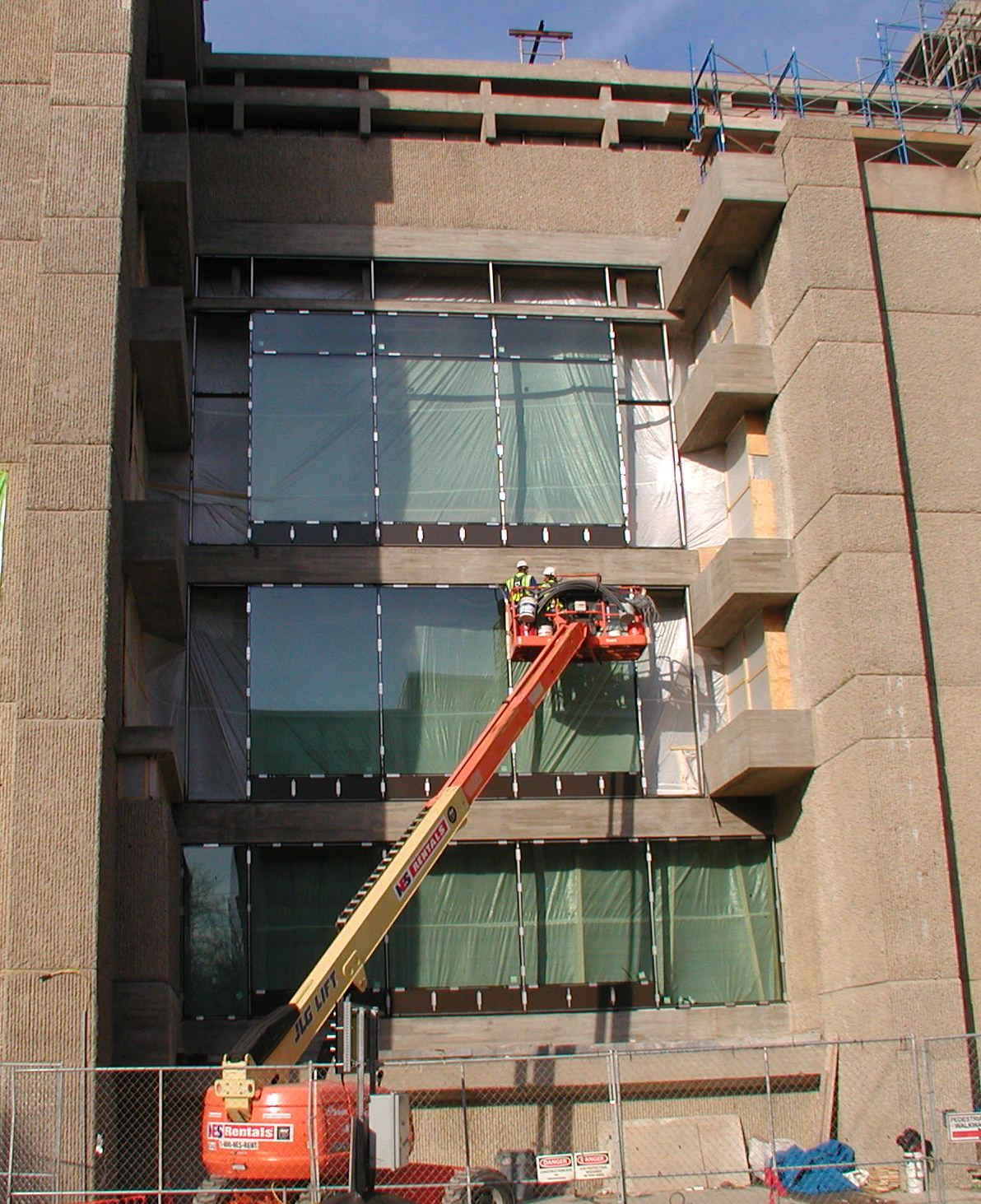
Rehabilitation of the Yale Art and Architecture Building, now renamed Paul Rudolph Hall.

- Ford Foundation Building, New York, building envelope investigations and rehabilitation, 1981–2011.
- United Nations Headquarters, New York, building envelope investigations and roof rehabilitations, 1986–2000.
- Chrysler Building, New York, spire and facade restoration, 1989–1997.
- United States Capitol dome, Washington DC, Historic preservation, 1990–2015.
- New York Stock Exchange Building, New York, historic facade and roof repair, 1990–2012.
- Marsh Inc. Headquarters, 1166 Avenue of the Americas, New York, building exterior and plaza rehabilitation, 1990–2011.
- Travelers Plaza and Tower Square, Hartford CT, plaza rehabilitation, 1991–2011.
- New York City Public Schools, New York City School Construction Authority, New York, building envelope maintenance manual and exterior rehabilitations, 1996–2005.
- Goodwin Hotel, Hartford CT, historic facade and roof restoration, 1998–2001.
- MetLife Building, New York, facade restoration, 1998–2004.
- Bank of New York, One Wall Street, New York, exterior condition study and rehabilitation, 1998, 2007–2008.
- Folger Shakespeare Library, Washington DC, exterior rehabilitation and water infiltration mitigation, 2002–2011.
- Scholastic Inc. Headquarters, New York, exterior restoration, 2003–2012.
- Smithsonian Institution, Arts and Industries Building, Washington DC, roof and facade rehabilitation, 2003–2012.
- Yale University Art + Architecture Building (Paul Rudolph Hall), New Haven CT, exterior restoration and third party review, 2006–2008. With Gwathmey Siegel & Associates Architects.
- Columbia University College Walk, campus thoroughfare rehabilitation, 2006–2009.
- Broad Exchange Building, 25 Broad Street, New York, facade investigation and repair, 2006–2011.
- MasterCard International Global Headquarters, Purchase NY, facade and entry plaza rehabilitation, 2008–2011.
- Baltimore City Public Parking Facilities, Baltimore MD, garage condition assessments, 2008–2012.
- One M&T Plaza, Buffalo, New York, plaza, parking garage, and entrance pavilion rehabilitation, 2013.
- Park City Plaza, Bridgeport, Connecticut, tower, parking garage rehabilitation and redesign, 2016–2019.
- 69th Regiment Armory, New York, historic facade rehabilitation and window replacement, 2011-2022.

== Awards ==
- National Trust for Historic Preservation Honor Award (1990) for Restoration of Radio City Music Hall, GE Building, and Rainbow Room at Rockefeller Center in New York, NY.
- AIA New England Regional Council Design Award (1991) for Dome Water Penetration Study of U.S. Capitol Building in Washington DC.
- New York Landmarks Conservancy Lucy G. Moses Award (1997) for Restoration of the Chrysler Building in New York.
- Associated Builders and Contractors Excellence in Construction Award (2003) for Stabilization of Jacobson Barn at the University of Connecticut in Storrs CT.
- International Masonry Institute Golden Trowel Award (2002) and AIA Connecticut Preservation Award (2005) for Facade Restoration of the Goodwin Hotel in Hartford CT.
- International Concrete Repair Institute Award of Merit (2007) for Facade Restoration of Ross Hall at the George Washington University in Washington DC.
- New York Landmarks Conservancy Lucy G. Moses Award (2007) and AIA Connecticut Design Award Honorable Mention(2007) for Exterior Restoration and Preservation of Scholastic Inc Headquarters in New York.
- International Masonry Institute Golden Trowel Award, Special Recognition (2009) for Facade Rehabilitation of Schering-Plough Headquarters in Summit NJ.
- AIA Connecticut Design Award (2009), AIA New York State Award of Excellence (2009), Connecticut Building Congress Project Team Award (2009), International Concrete Repair Institute Award of Excellence (2009), New York Construction Magazine Award of Merit (2009), and New Haven Preservation Trust Landmark Plaque (2014) for Renovation of Paul Rudolph Hall (formerly the Art + Architecture Building) at Yale University in New Haven CT.
- Massachusetts Historical Commission Preservation Award (2012) for Restoration of the Washburn Shops at Worcester Polytechnic Institute in Worcester MA.
- Engineering News-Record Award of Merit (2013) for Restoration of the United States Capitol dome skirt in Washington DC.
- American Institute of Architects Buffalo/Western New York Chapter Design Honor Award (2014) for Addition/Renovation of the Entrance Pavilion at One M+T Plaza in Buffalo NY.
- Engineering News-Record Mid-Atlantic Best Renovation/Restoration Project Award (2015) for The Catholic University of America, Father O'Connell Hall in Washington DC.
- Connecticut Trust for Historic Preservation Connecticut Preservation Award of Merit (2017) for Restoration of the New Haven County Courthouse in New Haven CT.
- AIA Virginia Honor Award for Excellence in Preservation (2018) and AIA|DC Design Award for Excellence in Historic Resources & Preservation (2018) for Restoration of the Dome of the United States Capitol in Washington DC.
- Connecticut Building Congress Project Team of the Year Award (2018) for Litchfield Judicial District Courthouse in Torrington, Connecticut.
- New York Landmarks Conservancy Lucy G. Moses Award (2022) for Adaptive Reuse of One Wall Street in Manhattan.
- Copper Development Association, North American Copper in Architecture Award (2022) for Lupton Hall at the State University of New York Farmingdale State College.
- New York Landmarks Conservancy Lucy G. Moses Award (2023) for Historic Facade Rehabilitation and Window Replacement at the 69th Regiment Armory in Manhattan.
- New York Landmarks Conservancy Lucy G. Moses Award (2024) for Historic Facade Restoration of Masonic Hall NYC.
Cast Iron Facade Restoration Process at Scholastic Inc. Headquarters in New York City
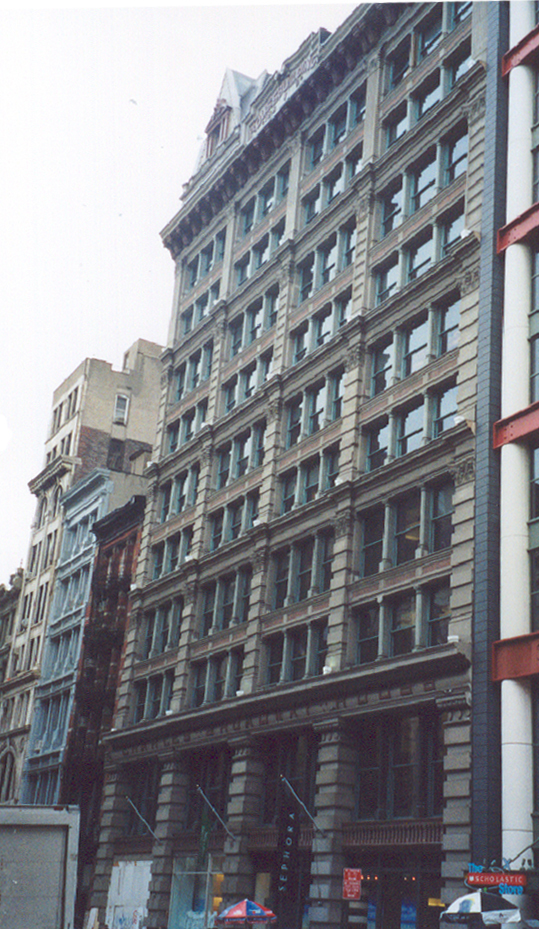
Scholastic Inc. Headquarters facade before restoration.

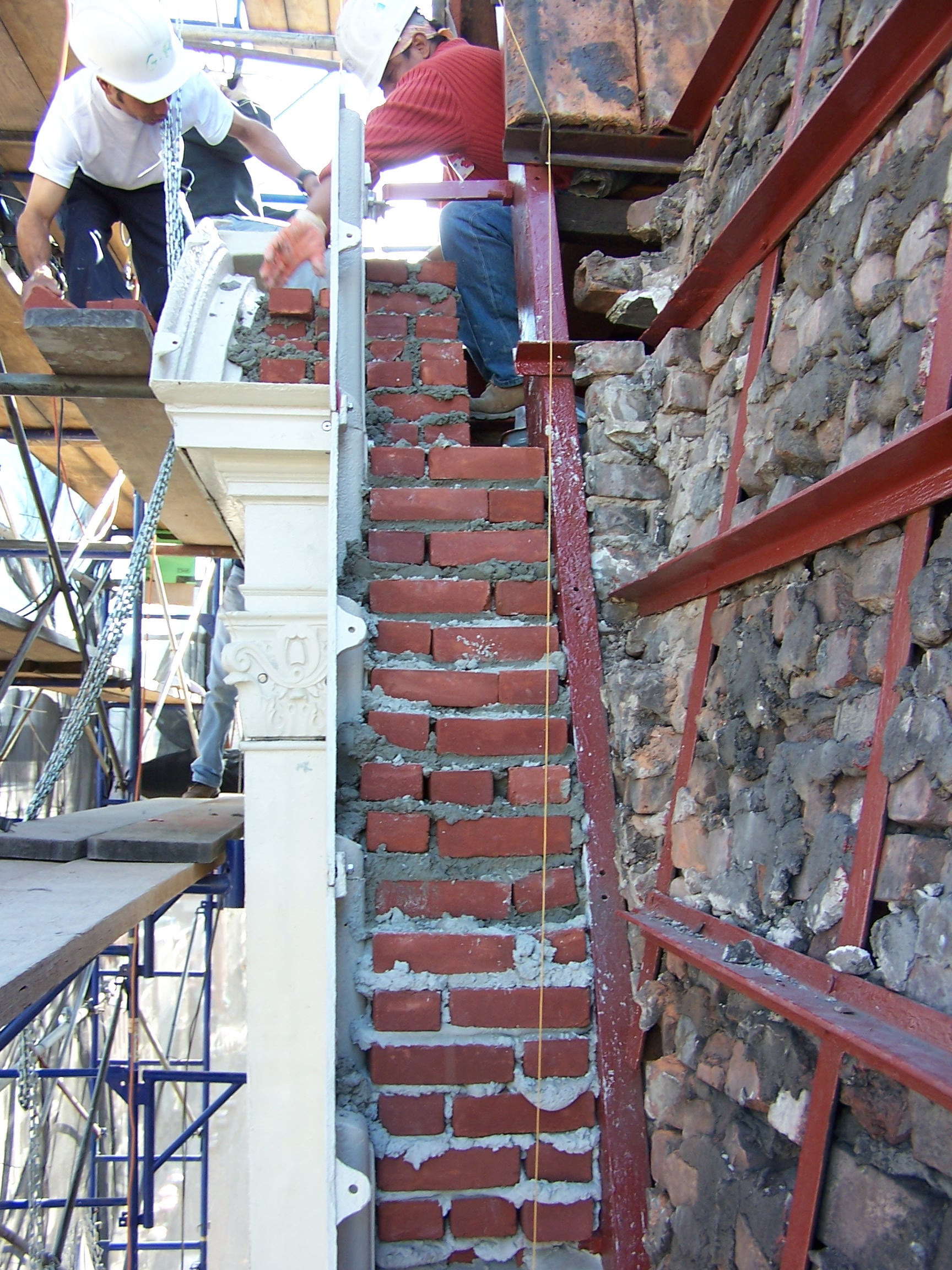
Masonry rehabilitation in process. Cast iron was restored off-site.

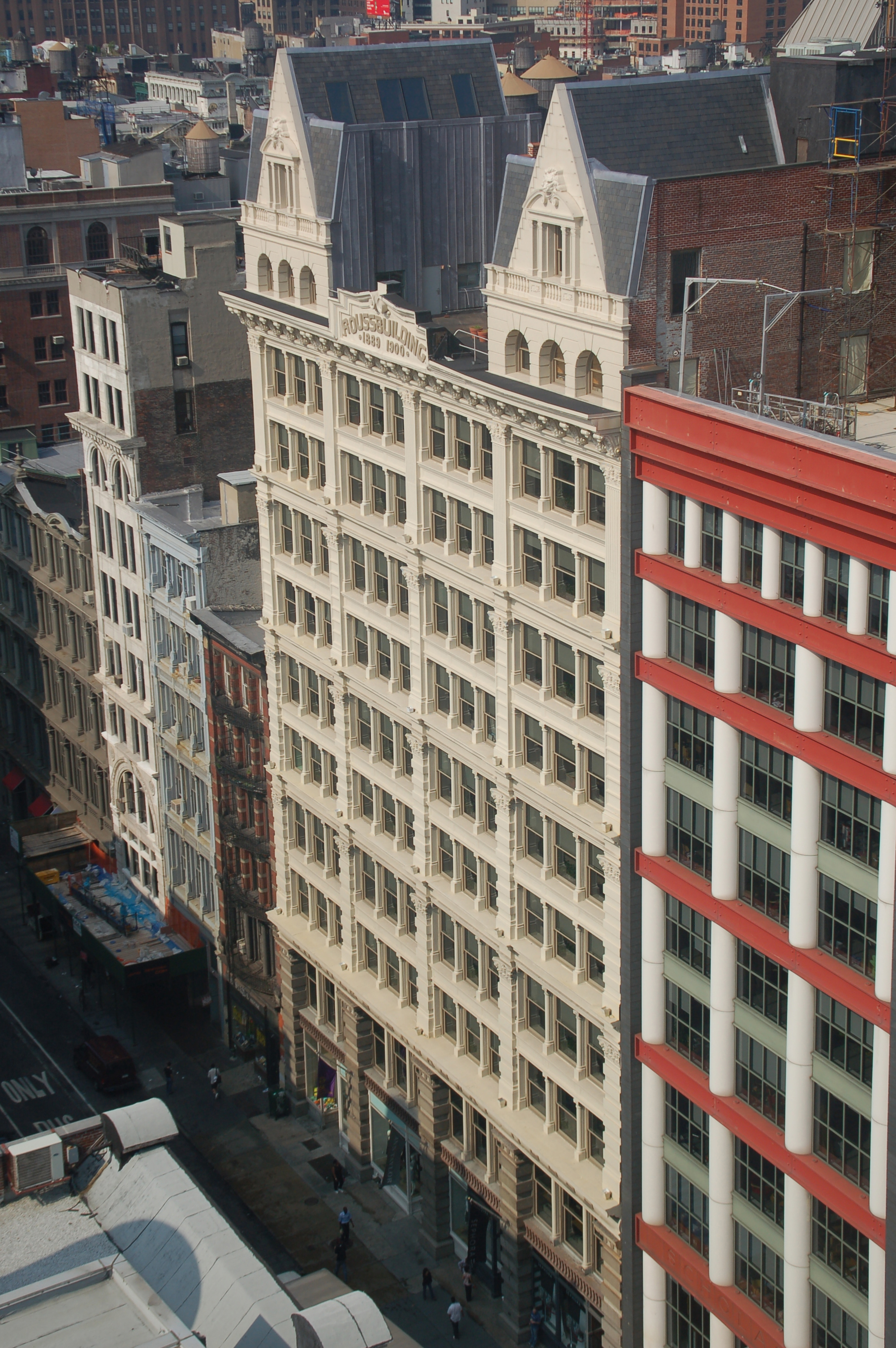
The restored facade received a 2007 New York Landmarks Conservancy Award.

== Technical Journal ==
Hoffmann Architects + Engineers self-publishes articles on a quarterly basis, covering topics related to building enclosure rehabilitation and professional practice. The eight-page, color publication, the JOURNAL, has been produced by the firm since 1983. Beginning with the first issue of 2011, the JOURNAL has been accredited by the AIA to provide Continuing Education System Learning Units. Recent topics include historic window rehabilitation, roof replacement, preservation of Modernist buildings, professional standard of care, precast concrete parking structures, and stone veneer facade systems.

== Hoffmann Diversity Advancement Scholarship Fund ==
Beginning in 2021, Hoffmann Architects + Engineers partnered with the Connecticut Architecture Foundation (CAF) to establish the Hoffmann Diversity Advancement Scholarship Fund, which provides tuition scholarships to students from underrepresented minorities studying architecture or engineering. Awardees also have the opportunity for a paid summer internship at one of Hoffmann's three offices. The first scholarship was awarded in 2023, and a second scholarship was awarded in 2024. For this and other initiatives, Hoffmann received several awards for diversity, equity, and inclusion, including the inaugural J.E.D.I. Award from the American Institute of Architects Connecticut chapter in 2021 and the Special Industry Recognition Award from the Construction Institute in 2023.
