= Union Metallic Cartridge Company =

Subsidiary of Remington Arms

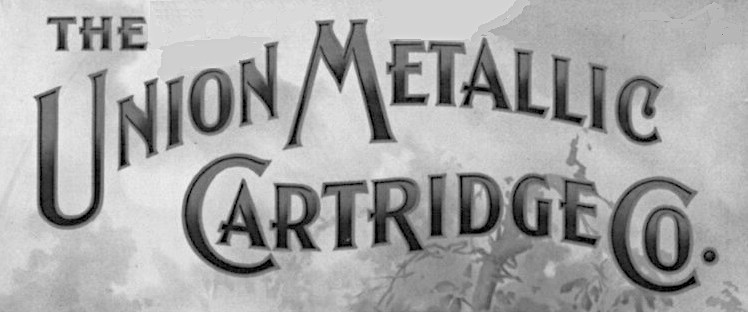
- Type: Private
- Industry: Weapons
- Founded: 1867
- Founder: Schuyler, Hartley & Graham
- Headquarters: Bridgeport, Connecticut, United States
- Products: Ammunition

The Union Metallic Cartridge Company (UMC) was an early manufacturer of cartridge ammunition for small arms. The company was founded in 1867 during the most rapid evolution of cartridge design to date. Following merger with Remington Arms in 1912, the company manufacturing complex in Bridgeport, Connecticut became a major arms supplier during World War I. The factory was Remington headquarters until 1984 and the source of sporting and police ammunition headstamped REM-UMC until 1970.

== Independent history ==
The New York sporting goods firm of Schuyler, Hartley & Graham purchased two small New England cartridge manufacturers in 1866. Machinery from the Crittenden & Tibbals Manufacturing Company of South Coventry, Connecticut, and from C.D. Leet of Springfield, Massachusetts, was moved to Bridgeport where ammunition production began as the Union Metallic Cartridge & Cap Company until the operation was incorporated as Union Metallic Cartridge Company in September 1867.

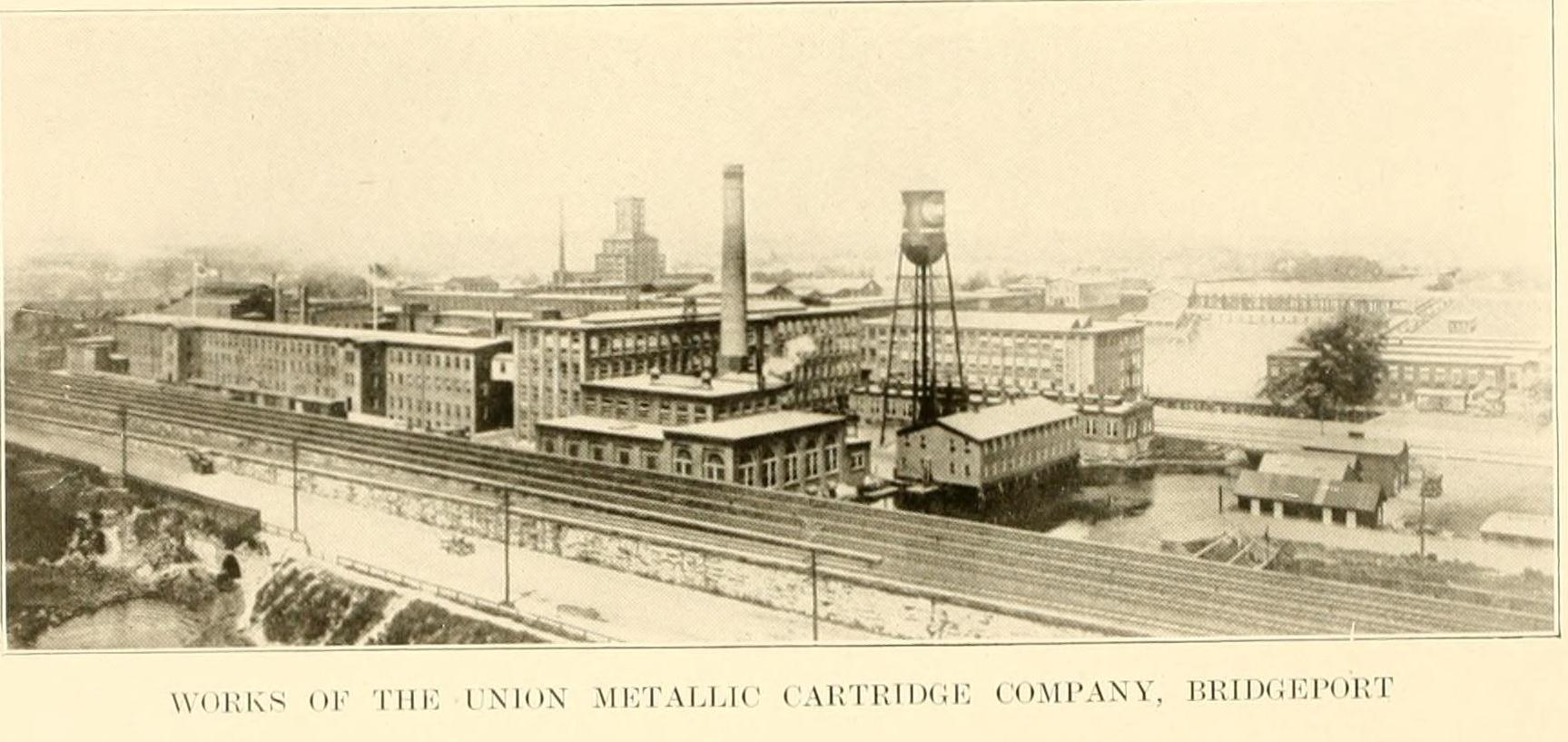
Works of the Union Metallic Cartridge Company, 1917

A powder magazine on Success Hill was destroyed by explosion of 16 tons of gunpowder on 14 May 1906. There were no deaths, but damage was reported as far away as Long Island. In February 1909 UMC completed a 190-foot (58 m) shot tower which was the tallest building in Connecticut for many years. The red brick shot tower functioned by dropping molten lead from a height of 133 feet (41 m) into vats of cold water 6 feet (1.8 m) deep.

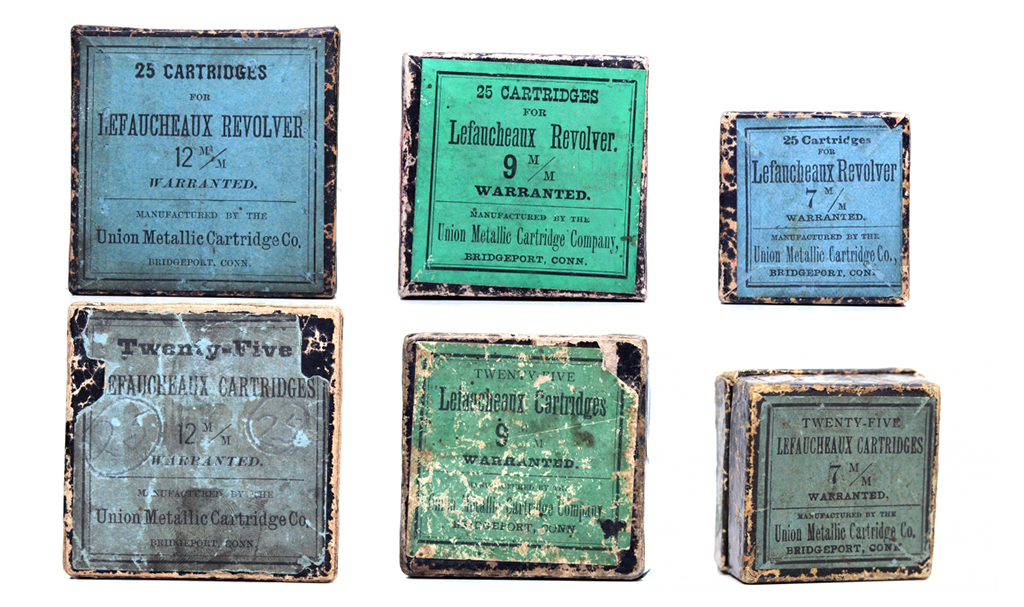
Pinfire Cartridge Boxes by Union Metallic Cartridge Company

== Merger with Remington ==
Schuyler, Hartley & Graham had purchased the firearms manufacturing firm of E. Remington and Sons in 1888 and formed Remington Arms as the firearms manufacturing arm of their sporting goods business. Remington merged with UMC in 1912 and Bridgeport became Remington-UMC corporate headquarters while firearms production stayed in Ilion, New York. Manufacture of ammunition continued at Bridgeport until 1970. In 1970, Remington/UMC built a new ammunition factory in Lonoke, Arkansas. Remington corporate headquarters moved to Delaware in 1984, and Remington had completely vacated the Bridgeport factory complex by 1988.
