= Park City Plaza =

Office building in Bridgeport, Connecticut

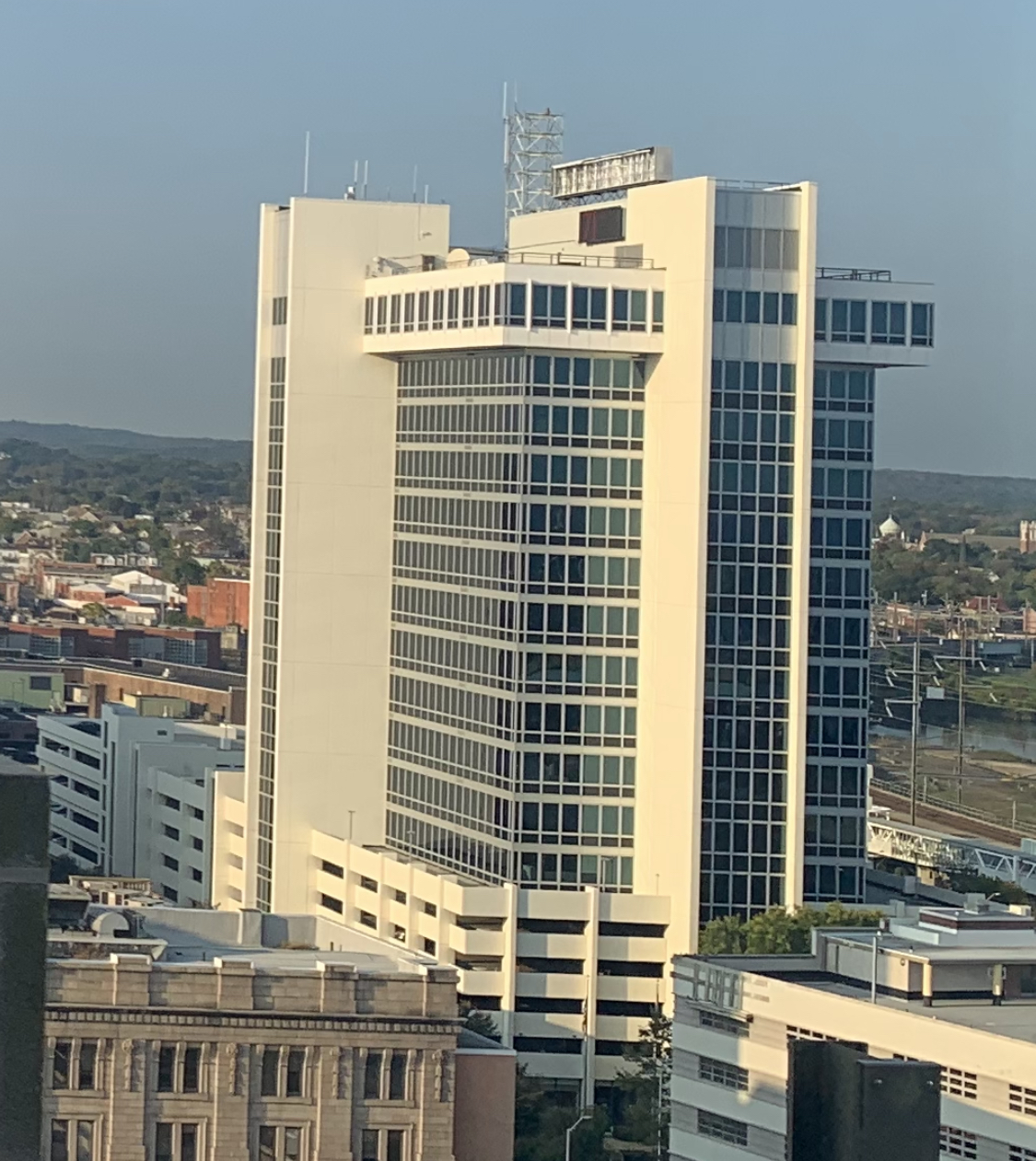
- Park City Plaza in 2021

General information
- Type: Office Building
- Location: 10 Middle Street; Bridgeport, Connecticut, U.S.
- Coordinates: 41.1786°N 73.1902°W
- Completed: 1973
- Renovated: 2019
- Owner: Trefz Properties

Height
- Roof: 218 ft (66 m)

Technical details
- Floor count: 18

Design and construction
- Architect: Victor Bisharat

Park City Plaza (also known as 10 Middle Street) is an office building in Bridgeport, Connecticut. The building serves as the headquarters of the Trefz Corporation and their subsidiary company, Trefz Properties. It was designed by architect Victor Bisharat and completed in 1973. This 18-story modernist style building, at 218 feet (66 m) tall, is the 2nd tallest building in Bridgeport. It was the tallest in the city upon completion, surpassing Embassy Towers.

The building was renovated through 2016–2019 by Hoffmann Architects.

== Design ==
Park City Plaza's base consists almost entirely of a parking garage which serves tenants and the public. The tower features two thin, rectangular pieces that protrude from the southern and western faces of the building, extending upward to the roof. The top floor has a greater floor area as it extends outward from the rest of the building below.

The roof of the building has two digital signs on its east and western faces that display the current time and temperature at all times. The signs are mounted on the side of a mechanical penthouse.

== History ==
The tower was built by the F.D. Rich Company in 1973 with plans to construct a second, identical tower near the building, but the project was ultimately canceled due to financial issues.

The building was bought by Trefz Properties in the 1980s.

=== Renovation ===
Park City Plaza's original facade, seen in 2012.

In 2016, Trefz Properties was looking to improve the appearance and energy efficiency of the building and its attached garage. The building's original facade, consisting of a curtain wall with dark-tinted spandrel glass, outlined with bronze anodized aluminum, containing some operable windows, and vertical precast concrete panels, was exhibiting signs of deterioration. In 2006, facade recaulking and recoating of the building's precast concrete panels were performed. While water infiltration was not a primary issue, leaks were reported during periods of wind-driven rain.

Trefz Properties chose Hoffmann Architects to investigate the existing curtain wall facade and recommend renovation options. On-site evaluation uncovered evidence of failed window gaskets, failed or dried sealant, and faded or stained finishes at aluminum components. Hoffmann Architects presented Trefz Properties with a few schematic design options to achieve their renovation objectives and address the intermittent leak issues.

Trefz Properties chose to replace the existing windows with blue-tinted reflective glass and replace the spandrel glass covers with colored panels. Replacement of the windows produced greater savings in energy costs. To withstand the weight of the thicker insulated glazing and meet current building codes for wind resistance, Hoffmann Architects recommended a new exterior metal trim to be installed over the existing mullions. The renovation project also included stabilization of the soffit at the top level of the building.

== See also ==
- List of tallest buildings in Connecticut
- Bridgeport Center
- 1000 Lafayette Boulevard
- City Trust Apartments
