= Bridgeport Downtown North Historic District =

Historic district in Connecticut, United States

- U.S. National Register of Historic Places
- U.S. Historic district
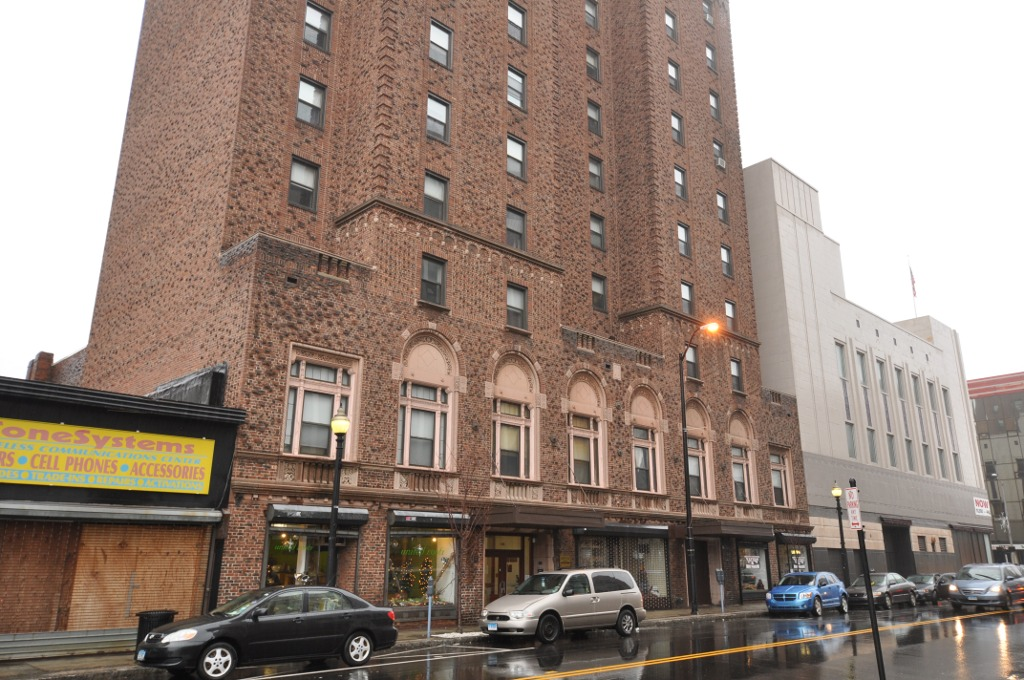
- The Hotel Beach

- Location within Connecticut Location within the United States
- Location: Roughly bounded by Congress, Water, Fairfield Avenue, Elm, Golden Hill & Chapel Streets Bridgeport, Connecticut
- Coordinates: 41°10′49″N 73°11′25″W
- Area: 20 acres (8.1 ha)
- Architect: Multiple
- Architectural style: Late 19th and 20th Century Revivals, Moderne, Late Victorian
- MPS: Downtown Bridgeport MRA
- NRHP reference No.: 87001403
- Added to NRHP: November 2, 1987

The Bridgeport Downtown North Historic District encompasses a portion of the commercial downtown of Bridgeport, Connecticut. It is roughly bounded on the north by Congress Street, the east by Water and Middle Streets, the south by Fairfield Avenue, and the west by Lyon Terrace (although it does not include any properties on the latter Street), roughly the northeastern quadrant of the downtown area. It is one of two large clusters of historically significant commercial and civic buildings (the other is the Bridgeport Downtown South Historic District) encapsulating the city's growth as an urban industrial and regional government center. It was listed on the National Register of Historic Places in 1987.

== Description and history ==
Bridgeport was a relatively modest coastal community until the post-Civil War era, at which time it began an explosive period of growth to become one of Connecticut's major industrial and population centers. Its downtown area is reflective of this growth, with buildings surviving from all phases of its post-Civil War history. The Downtown North Historic District contains representative samples of the city's architectural changes between 1860 and the 1930s, including several buildings designed by notable local and regional architects. Local architect Warren Briggs is credited with two buildings in the district: the Romanesque Bridgeport Boys Club (1900) and the imposing Romanesque Fairfield County Courthouse (1888). The Art Deco Hotel Beach (1927) was designed by Thomas, Martin & Kirkpatrick, and the Art Deco Main Post Office was designed by Charles Wellington Walker.

The historic district roughly covers the northeast quadrant of Bridgeport's downtown. It is bounded on the south by Fairfield Avenue, which is mainly lined with more modern buildings, on the west by Lyon Terrace (which is part of the Golden Hill Historic District), the north by Congress Street and the west by Water Street. There are 51 contributing properties in the district, which is about 20 acres (8.1 ha) in size. Most of the buildings have exteriors of stone, brick, or concrete. The oldest building in the district is the Italianate c. 1860 Fox Building at 166-174 Middle Street.

== See also ==
- National Register of Historic Places listings in Bridgeport, Connecticut
