= Bridgeport Downtown South Historic District =

Historic district in Connecticut, United States

- U.S. National Register of Historic Places
- U.S. Historic district
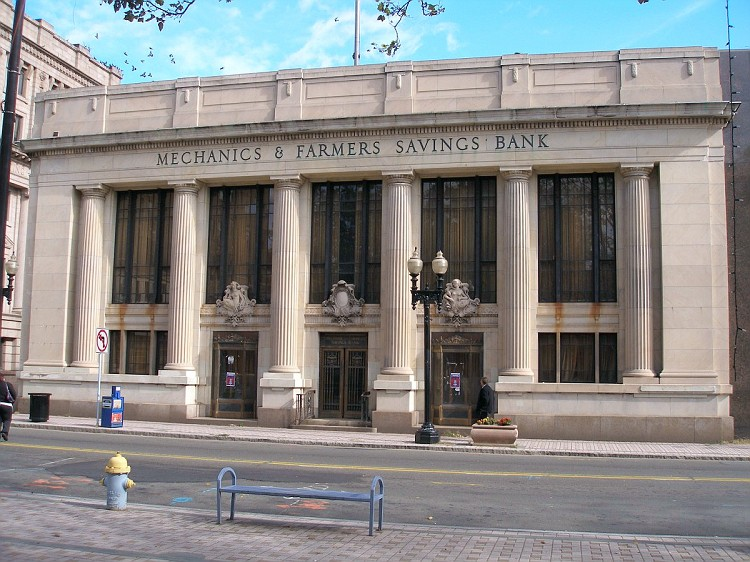
- The former Mechanics & Farmers Savings Bank building

- Location within Connecticut Location within the United States
- Location: Roughly bounded by Elm, Cannon, Main, Gilbert, and Broad Streets Bridgeport, Connecticut
- Coordinates: 41°10′37″N 73°11′30″W
- Area: 27 acres (11 ha)
- Architect: Cass Gilbert and others
- Architectural style: Late 19th and 20th Century Revivals, Late Victorian, Moderne
- MPS: Downtown Bridgeport MRA
- NRHP reference No.: 87001402
- Added to NRHP: September 3, 1987

The Bridgeport Downtown South Historic District encompasses the historic elements of the southern part of downtown Bridgeport, Connecticut. It is 27 acres (11 ha) in size, roughly bordered on the east by Main and Middle Streets, on the north by Elm Street, the west by Broad Street, and the south by Cesar Batalla Way. This area includes the highest concentration of buildings developed in the commercial downtown between about 1840 and the 1930s, the period of the city's major growth as a manufacturing center, and includes a diversity of architectural styles representative of that time period. The district was listed on the National Register of Historic Places in 1987.

== Description and history ==
The Bridgeport Downtown South Historic District includes 50 contributing buildings and 12 non-contributing buildings. The district includes one building, 149-165 State Street, designed by architect Cass Gilbert. Other notable buildings include the separately-listed Barnum Museum, Sterling Block-Bishop Arcade and United Illuminating Company Building, as well as McLevy Hall, the former city hall and county courthouse. It is bordered in most areas by more modern construction, with part of the northwesternmost section bordering the Golden Hill Historic District. It is separated from the Bridgeport Downtown North Historic District by a section of modern development along Fairfield Avenue.

In the late 18th century, Bridgeport was known as Newfields, a village of the town of Stratford. With a location adjacent to a good harbor, the village became a significant center of maritime commerce, and it was separately incorporated as a town in 1821, and as a city in 1836. Rail connections to New York City and the northwestern interior of Connecticut cemented its role as a major commercial hub by the early 1850s. Industrial development followed in the second half of the 19th century, with the core financial and commercial services focused on the downtown area that had arisen near the waterfront. The result of this development pattern was the surviving architectural diversity now seen in its downtown area.

== See also ==
- Bridgeport Downtown North Historic District
- Golden Hill Historic District (Bridgeport, Connecticut)
- National Register of Historic Places listings in Bridgeport, Connecticut
