= 1000 Lafayette Boulevard =

Skyscraper in Bridgeport, Connecticut, US

- 1000 Lafayette Boulevard Downtown Bridgeport, Connecticut (cropped) 1000 Lafayette Boulevard in 2026
- Interactive map of the 1000 Lafayette Boulevard area
- Former names: Wright Building, Wright International Finance Tower, RBS Building

General information
- Status: Completed
- Type: Office
- Architectural style: Postmodern
- Location: 1000 Lafayette Boulevard, Bridgeport, Connecticut, United States
- Coordinates: 41°10′34.45″N 73°11′32.52″W
- Completed: 1990

Height
- Roof: 171 ft (52 m)

Technical details
- Floor count: 11

1000 Lafayette Boulevard (formerly known as the Wright Building, Wright International Finance Tower, and RBS Building) is a 171 ft (52 m) tall postmodern style office building located on 1000 Lafayette Boulevard in Downtown Bridgeport. The building has 11 floors and was built in 1990. It is the 6th-tallest building in Bridgeport.

The building has been the headquarters for WorkPlace since 2020.

== See also ==
- Park City Plaza
- Bridgeport Center
- Bridgeport Hospital
- Remington Shot Tower
- St. Vincent's Medical Center (Bridgeport)
