= United States Post Office–Bridgeport Main =

- US Post Office-Bridgeport Main
- U.S. National Register of Historic Places
- U.S. Historic district – Contributing property
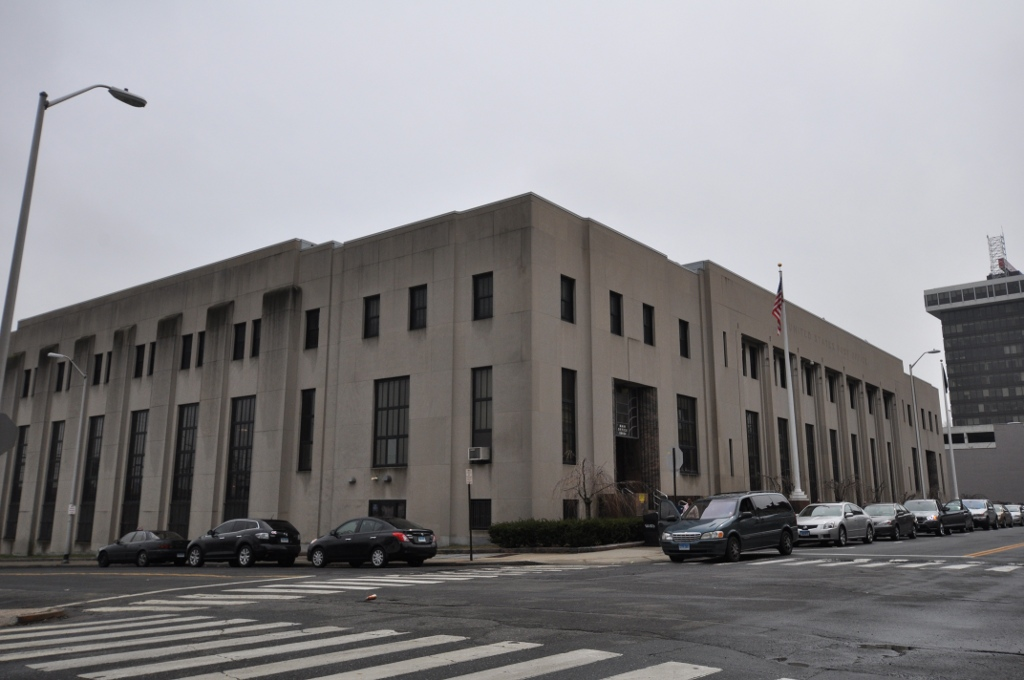
- The post office as seen from the intersection of Golden Hill and Middle Streets.

- Location within Connecticut Location within the United States
- Location: 120 Middle Street, Bridgeport, Connecticut
- Coordinates: 41°10′50″N 73°11′20″W
- Area: 1.2 acres (0.49 ha)
- Built: 1934
- Architect: Simon, Louis A.; Walker, Charles Wellington
- Architectural style: Moderne, Art Deco
- Part of: Bridgeport Downtown North Historic District (ID87001403)
- NRHP reference No.: 86000453

Significant dates
- Added to NRHP: March 17, 1986
- Designated CP: November 2, 1987

The Bridgeport Main Post Office is located at 120 Middle Street in Bridgeport, Connecticut. It is a three-story Moderne/Art Deco, designed by Louis A. Simon, the supervising architect of the United States Treasury Department, and completed in 1934. The building notably includes artwork funded by the department's Section of Painting and Sculpture, with murals in its lobby area drawn by R. L. Lambden depicting mail delivery through the ages.

The building was listed on the National Register of Historic Places in 1986.

== See also ==
- National Register of Historic Places listings in Bridgeport, Connecticut
- List of United States post offices
