= Golden Hill Historic District (Bridgeport, Connecticut) =

Historic district in Connecticut, United States

- U.S. National Register of Historic Places
- U.S. Historic district
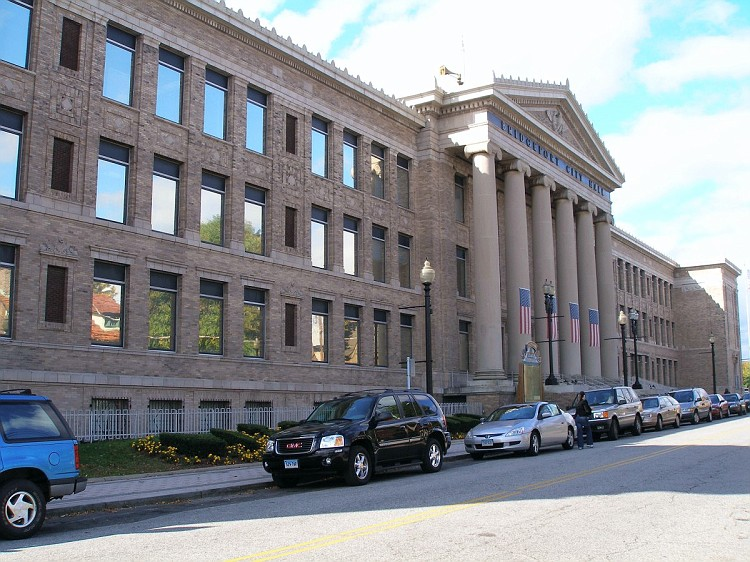
- Bridgeport City Hall, formerly a high school, built 1914-16

- Location within Connecticut Location within the United States
- Location: Roughly bounded by Congress Street, Lyon Terrace, Elm, and Harrison Streets, Bridgeport, Connecticut
- Coordinates: 41°10′52″N 73°11′36″W
- Area: 10 acres (4.0 ha)
- Architect: Rogers, John Gamble; Et al.
- Architectural style: Late 19th And 20th Century Revivals, Late Victorian, Neo-Classical
- MPS: Downtown Bridgeport MRA
- NRHP reference No.: 87001404
- Added to NRHP: September 3, 1987

The Golden Hill Historic District encompasses a well-preserved formerly residential area on the northwest fringe of Downtown Bridgeport, Connecticut. Located mainly on Lyon Terrace, Gold Hill Street, and Congress Street, the district includes 11 formerly residential buildings now mainly in commercial use, which were built between about 1890 and 1930. It also includes Bridgeport City Hall (a 1916 high school building which has been repurposed), and the Golden Hill United Methodist Church. The district was listed on the National Register of Historic Places in 1987.

== Description and history ==
Golden Hill is a rise overlooking the commercial heart of downtown Bridgeport to its southeast. The historic district, an area of about 10 acres (4.0 ha), is visually separated from the rest of downtown by parking lots to the east and southeast. The main cluster of buildings, a series of residential buildings, extend along the east side of Lyon Terrace and the south side of Congress Street, ending at Chapel Street. The northernmost buildings are a series of Queen Anne tenement houses built about 1890, while the southern group are a later disparate group of Colonial Revival houses built in the first two decades of the 20th century.

Occupying the entire west side of Lyon Terrace is Bridgeport's city hall, which was built in 1914-16 as a high school to a design by James Gamble Rogers, and was repurposed to its present use in the 1930s. Rogers was prominent in the region, but this is his only known work in Bridgeport. Rounding out the district are a few noncontributing commercial buildings on the south side of Golden Hill Road, two residences (c. 1850 Italianate and 1910 Colonial Revival), and the Methodist Church, an imposing Gothic Revival structure built in 1928-29 to a design by Southey, Allen, and Collens. Attached to the church is its Tudor Revival parish house.

The Golden Hill area was owned in the late 19th century by the Lyon family, which oversaw its eventual subdivision for development. It was developed somewhat speculatively as a residential area located conveniently close to the downtown area. The c. 1850 Thorp House on Golden Hill Road is a rare Italianate hip-roofed house to survive anywhere in Bridgeport's downtown.

== See also ==
- Bridgeport Downtown North Historic District
- National Register of Historic Places listings in Bridgeport, Connecticut
