= Remington Shot Tower =

Shot tower in Bridgeport, Connecticut, US

- Remington Arms shot tower (54531387451) (cropped) The Remington Shot Tower in 2024
- Interactive map of the Remington Shot Tower area

General information
- Status: Completed
- Type: Industrial
- Architectural style: Neo-Classical
- Location: 800 Arctic Street, Bridgeport, Connecticut, United States
- Coordinates: 41°11′19.09″N 73°10′26.70″W
- Completed: 1909

Height
- Roof: 167 ft (51 m)

Technical details
- Floor count: 10

The Remington-Union Metallic Cartridge Shot Tower (more commonly referred to as the Remington Shot Tower) is a historic shot tower located on 800 Arctic Street in Bridgeport, Connecticut. Standing 167 ft (51 m) tall with 10 floors, it was the 2nd-tallest building in Bridgeport and the 6th-tallest building in Connecticut upon its completion in 1909. (Note: The steeple that makes up most of the height of St. Mary's Church in New Haven was built in 1982.) The building is one of the few remaining shot towers in the world.

The building was a part of the Remington Arms Factory. In 1970, Remington moved its ammunitions factory to Lonoke, Arkansas, and by the late 1980s, the factory had been abandoned.

The building is last surviving part of the Remington Arms Factory, as the rest of the factory was demolished in 2023. There are currently plans to redevelop the tower into a business center.

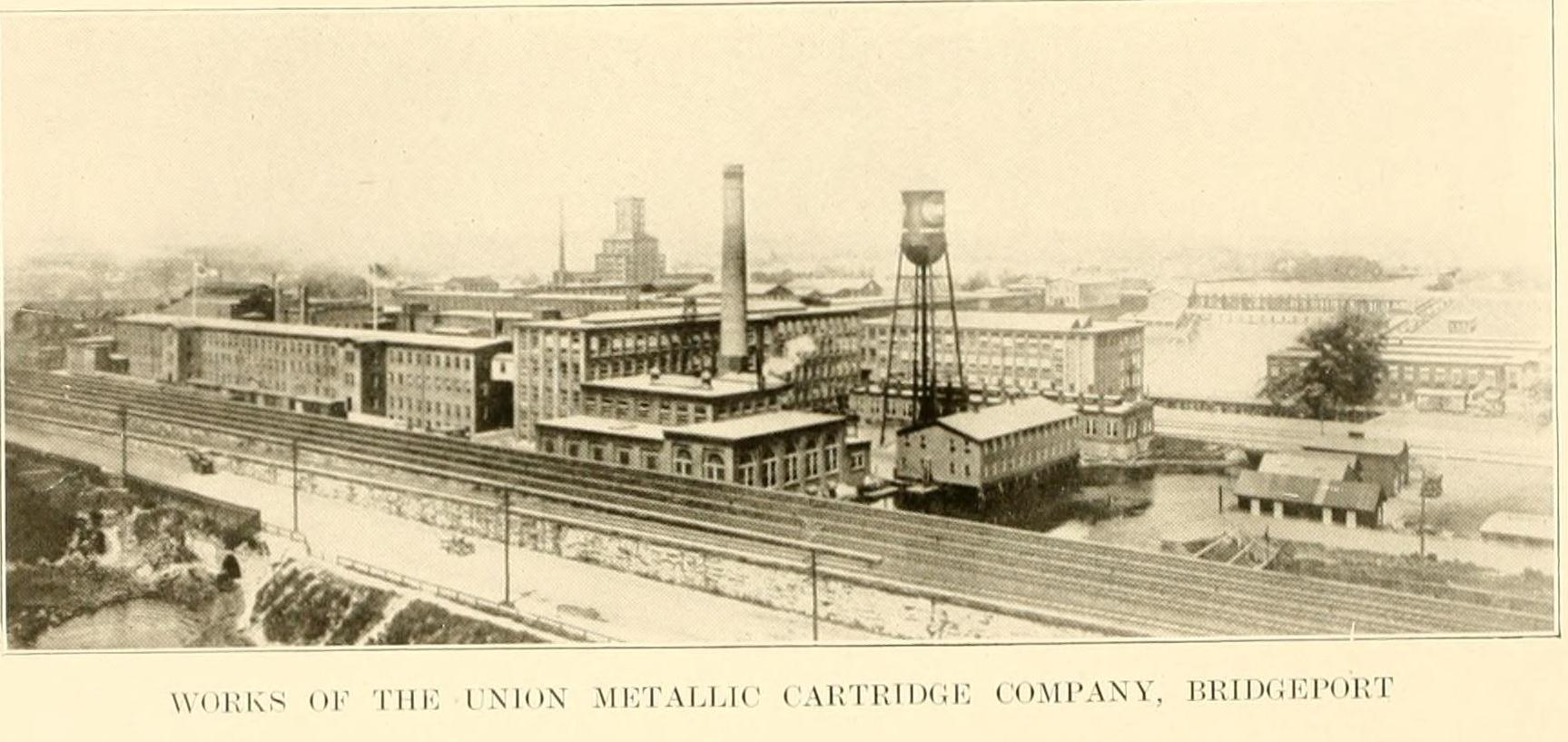
The Remington Arms Factory in the 1910s. The Remington Shot Tower can be seen in the background

== See also ==
- Phoenix Shot Tower
- Shot Tower (Dubuque, Iowa)
- Coop's Shot Tower
