= Bridgeport Center =

Office building complex in Bridgeport, Connecticut

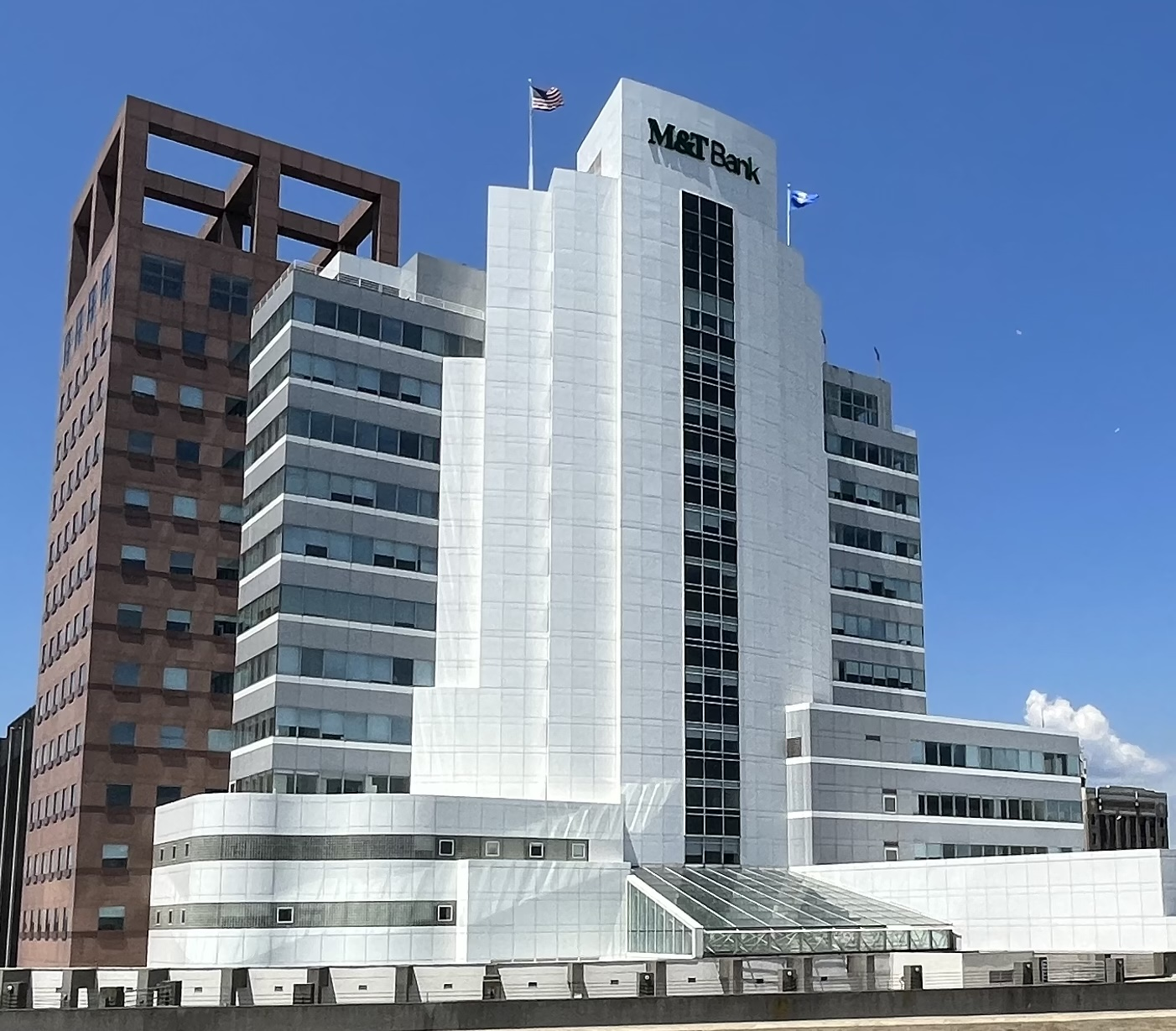
- Bridgeport Center in 2022
- Interactive map of the Bridgeport Center area

General information
- Type: Office Complex
- Location: 850 Main Street; Bridgeport, Connecticut, U.S.
- Coordinates: 41.1765°N 73.1877°W
- Construction started: 1984
- Completed: 1989

Height
- Architectural: 267 ft (81 m) (Main roof)
- Roof: 248 ft (76 m) (Red wing)

Technical details
- Floor count: 18

Design and construction
- Architect: Richard Meier & Partners Architects LLP

Bridgeport Center (also known as the People's Bank Building) is a continuous complex of low to mid-rise office buildings in downtown Bridgeport, Connecticut. The complex served as the headquarters of People's United Financial, now a subsidiary of M&T Bank. It serves as the regional headquarters of M&T Bank in New England. It was designed by Richard Meier & Partners Architects LLP and finished construction in 1989. The complex was built in part of efforts to revitalize the city's Downtown. Perhaps best known for its central tower, this 18-story postmodern style building, at a roof height of 267 feet (81 m), is the tallest building in Bridgeport. It is adjacent to the Barnum Museum.

The building is located at 850 Main Street on the site of the First National Bank Building, which shared the same address.

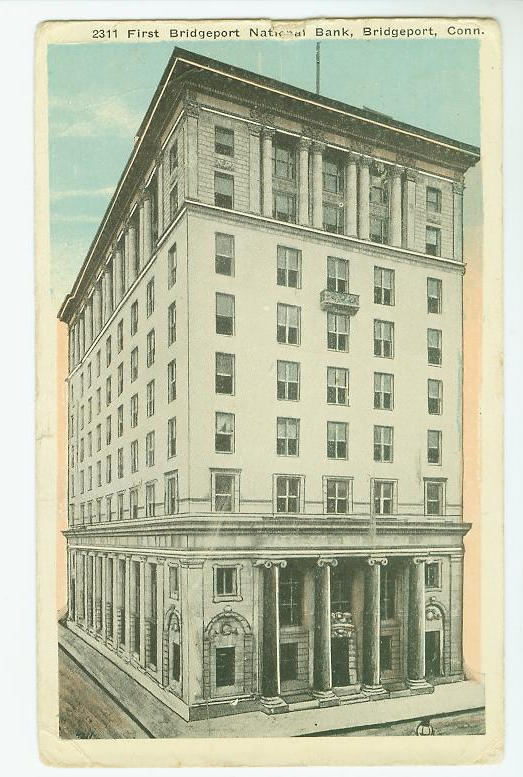
The 10 story Bridgeport National Bank, later the Connecticut National Bank headquarters, which was demolished and replaced by Bridgeport Center in the 80s.

Law firm Pullman & Comley LLC also has space in the complex.

== Design ==
Bridgeport Center has a gross total of 304,500 sq ft (28,290 m^{2}) of interior space. The form of the building consists of a continuous fabric of low to mid-rise office buildings. A seven-story parking garage resides on the eastern portion of the building's base, with access to the lobby atrium and elevators. The ground floor also houses an M&T Bank branch.

=== Tower ===
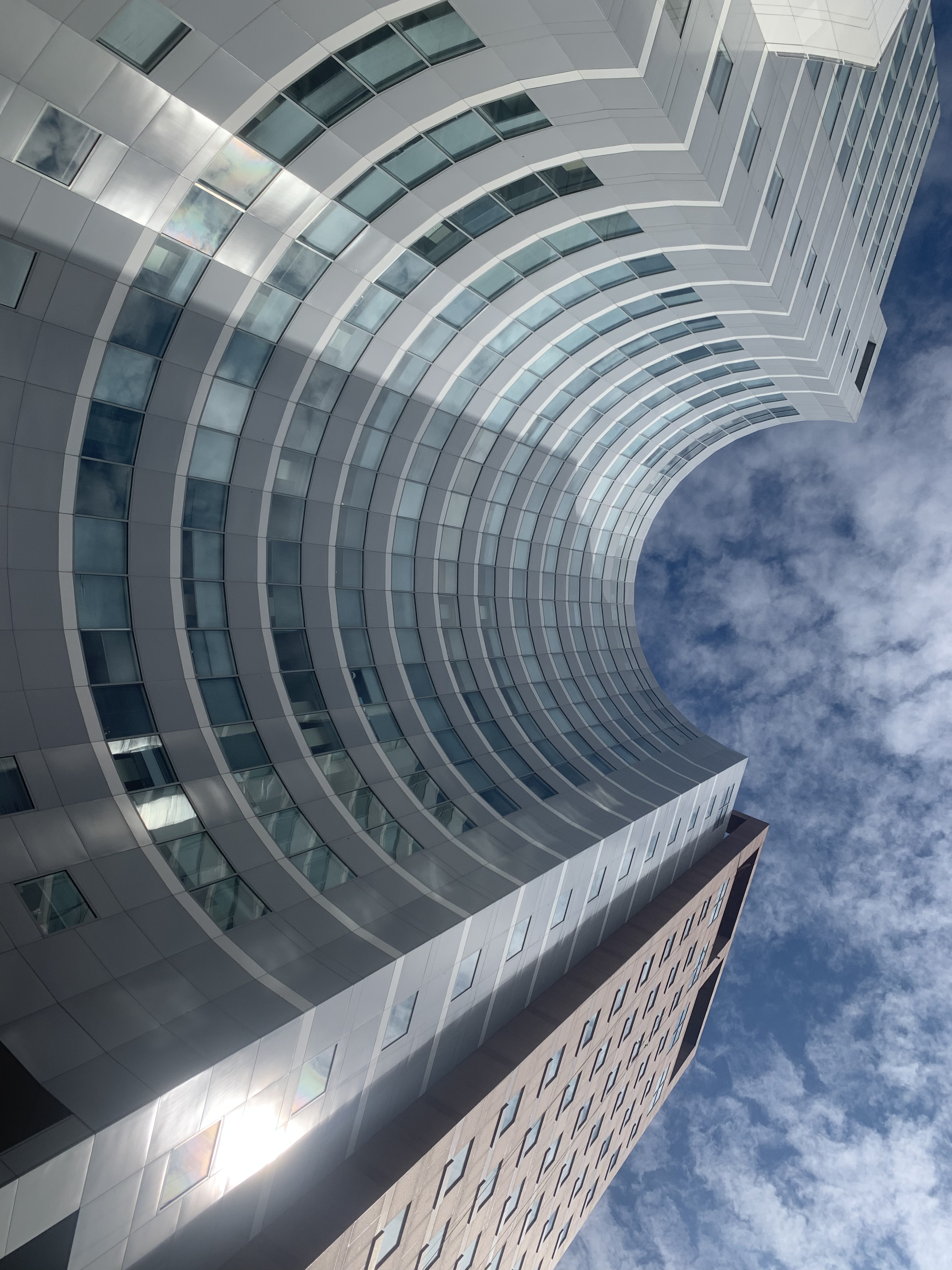
Bridgeport Center viewed from the ground, on its west facade.

An 18-story tower rises from the complex, clad with steel and granite facades. The red wing to the south is primarily made of granite and rises to a height of 248 feet, with an arrangement of thick granite pillars forming the tower's distinguishing roof piece. To the north of the red wing, a wider white portion holds most of the tower's area. On the west face, this part of the building has a central curve inward. The roof of this portion contains two mechanical penthouses that are stacked on top of each other, each having a greater setback than the last, reaching the building's ultimate height of 267 feet.

== In popular culture ==
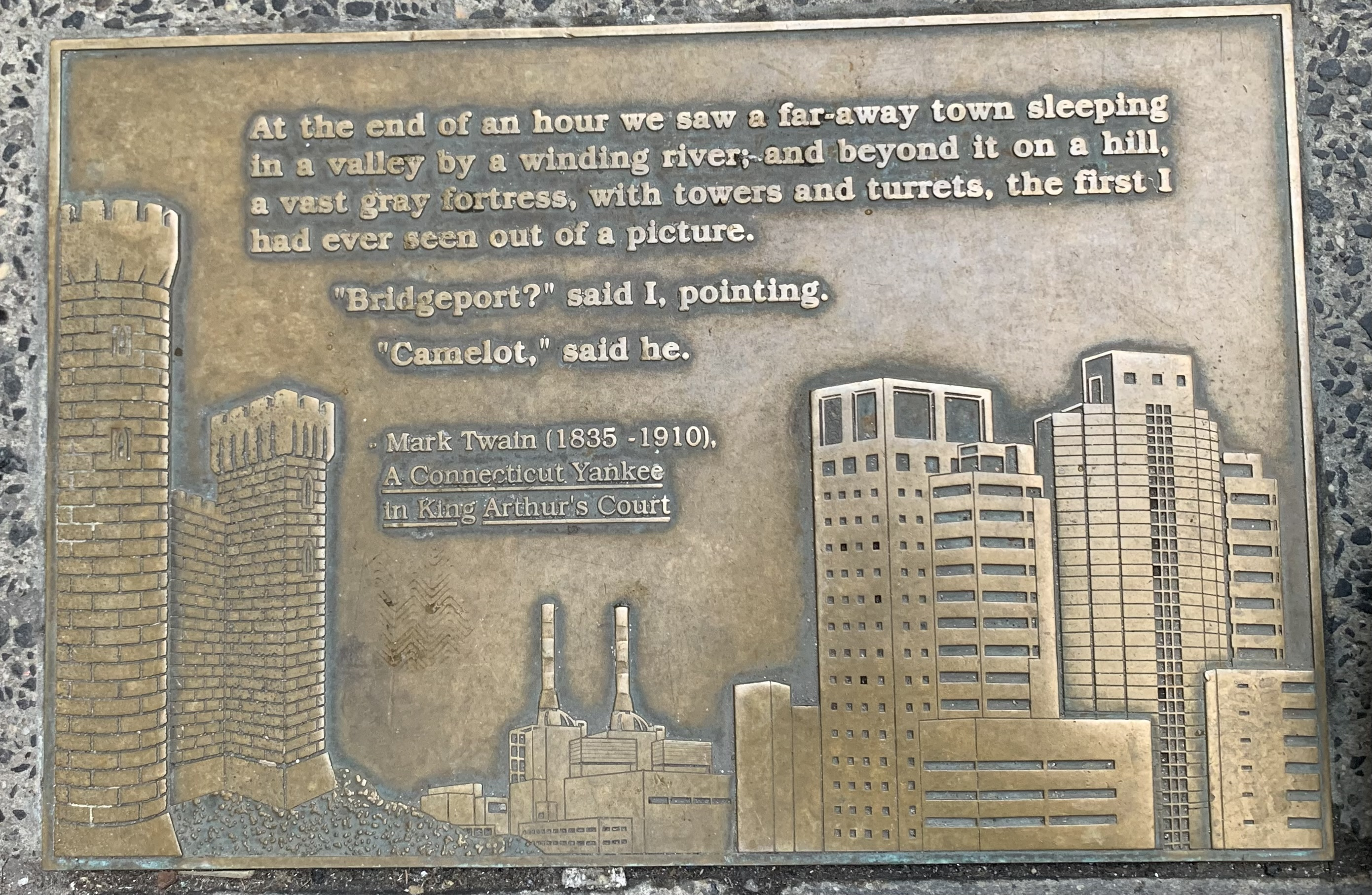
Bridgeport Center seen on the right

- The building is featured on a plaque on Library Way in Midtown Manhattan, New York City

== See also ==
- List of tallest buildings in Connecticut
- Barnum Museum
- Park City Plaza
- 1000 Lafayette Boulevard
