= Hotel Beach =

Historic hotel in Bridgeport, Connecticut

- U.S. National Register of Historic Places
- U.S. Historic district – Contributing property
- Hotel Barnum
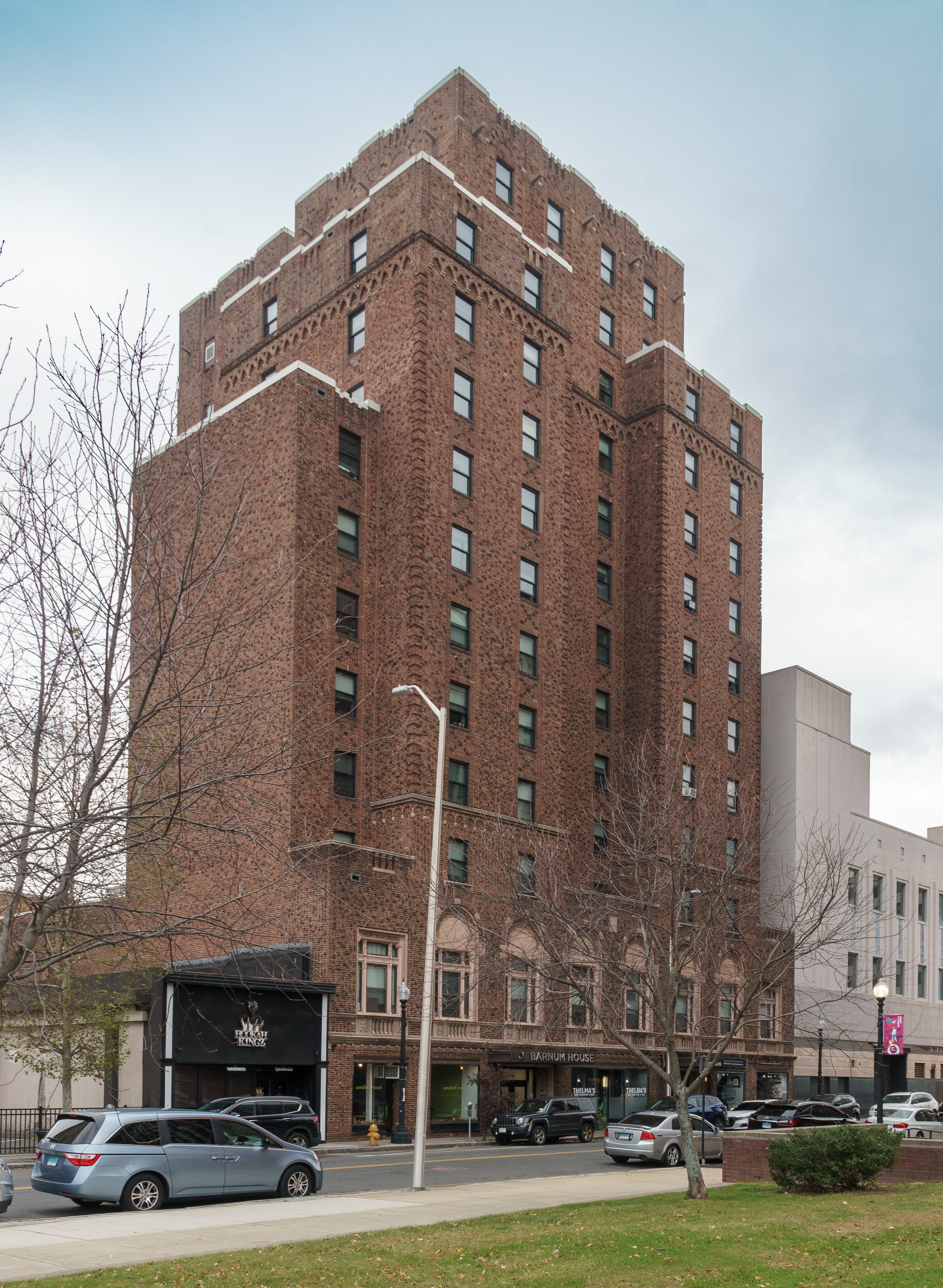

- Location within Connecticut Location within the United States
- Location: 140 Fairfield Avenue, Bridgeport, Connecticut
- Coordinates: 41°10′45″N 73°11′26″W
- Area: 0.6 acres (0.24 ha)
- Built: 1927-1928
- Architect: Thomas, Martin & Kirkpatrick
- Architectural style: Art Deco
- Part of: Bridgeport Downtown North Historic District (ID87001403)
- NRHP reference No.: 78002839

Significant dates
- Added to NRHP: December 14, 1978
- Designated CP: November 2, 1987

The Hotel Beach, also known historically as the Hotel Barnum, is a historic hotel building at 140 Fairfield Avenue in Bridgeport, Connecticut. It is a thirteen-story Art Deco tower built in 1927 and designed by Thomas, Martin & Kirkpatrick. It is one of the city's outstanding Art Deco buildings, built when the city was at its peak. It was listed on the National Register of Historic Places in 1978. It is a contributing building in the Bridgeport Downtown North Historic District, NRHP-listed in 1987. It is currently a residential apartment building called Barnum House.

== Description and history ==
The former Hotel Beach is located on the north side of downtown Bridgeport, facing south toward Fairfield Avenue between Main and Broad Streets. It is a thirteen-story building, with a steel and concrete frame covered in colored bricks. Its main tower has two ten-story protruding sections, and is flanked on either side by eight-story sections, giving the building a stepped appearance. The second story facade consists of a band of Romanesque round-arch windows. The interior of the second floor, which housed the hotel's lobby, retains many period features and finishes.

The hotel was built in 1927–29 to a design by the New York firm Thomas, Martin & Kirkpatrick, which had a track record of hotel design. It was originally named for the landowner, businessman Francis Beach, but was soon renamed in honor of Bridgeport booster P.T. Barnum. Because it was built just before the Great Depression, it was foreclosed on just a year after its 1929 opening.

The early country music singer Vernon Dalhart, originally from Texas, worked at the hotel after stardom.

== See also ==
- National Register of Historic Places listings in Bridgeport, Connecticut
