= Estate (land) =

Comprises the buildings and supporting farmland and woods of a very large property

An estate is a large parcel of land under single ownership, which generates income for its owner.

== British and Irish context ==
In the United Kingdom, historically an estate comprises the houses, outbuildings, supporting farmland, tenanted buildings, and natural resources (such as woodland) that surround the gardens and grounds of a very large property, such as a country house, mansion, palace or castle. It is the modern term for a manor, but lacks a manor's now-abolished jurisdiction.

The same concept is apparent in Australia, though the word homestead is used more commonly, with "estate" typically being used for larger, historic properties.

=== Country house estate ===
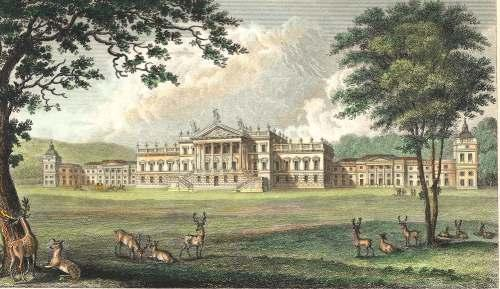
Wentworth Woodhouse is a large rural estate, extending to 15,000 acres including the country house.

The "estate" formed an economic system where the profits from its produce and rents (of housing or agricultural land) sustained the main household, formerly known as the manor house. Thus, "the estate" may refer to all other cottages and villages in the same ownership as the mansion itself, covering more than one former manor. Examples of such great estates are Woburn Abbey in Bedfordshire, England, and Blenheim Palace, in Oxfordshire, England, built to replace the former manor house of Woodstock.

Before the 1870s, these estates often encompassed several thousand acres, generally consisting of several farms let to tenants; the great house was supplied with food from its own home farm (for meat and dairy) and a kitchen garden (for fruit and vegetables). A dower house may have been present on the estate to allow the widow of the former owner her own accommodation and household when moved out of the primary house on the estate. Gatekeeper's lodges replaced the gatehouses of the medieval manor. Grounds were landscaped in line with social trends.

The agricultural depression from the 1870s onwards and the decline of servants meant that the large rural estates declined in social and economic significance, and many of the country houses were destroyed, or land was parcelled off to be sold.

In Ireland, much of the land conquered from the Gaelic Irish kings in the Norman conquest (12th century), Tudor conquest (16th century) and Cromwellian conquest (17th century) was turned into estates for British settlers and planters, as well as some loyal Irish lords. The Anglo-Irish big house was at the centre of about 4,000 Irish estates in 1800. These estates were broken up in the Irish Land Acts of the late 19th century which transferred most of their land to tenant ownership. Many of the big houses were also destroyed in the Irish War of Independence and Civil War (1919–23). Many of the old estates and surviving houses are tourist attractions. Curraghmore Estate is one of few surviving large estates, comprising 2,500 acres (10 km^{2}) in County Waterford belonging to the de la Poer Beresford family.

=== The great estates ===
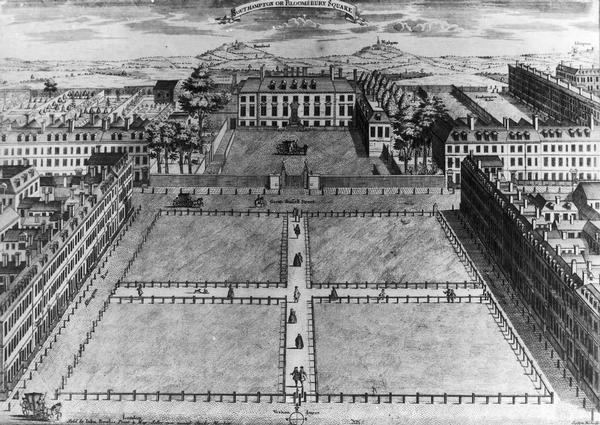
Looking north across Bloomsbury Square on the Bedford Estate with Bedford House behind, c. 1725, London town house of the Dukes of Bedford

An urban example of the use of the term estate is presented by the "great estates" in Central London such as the Grosvenor and Portman, which continue to generate significant income through rent. Sometimes London streets are named after the rural estates of aristocratic landowners, such as in the case of Wimpole Street.

=== Sporting estate ===
From the Norman era, hunting had always been a popular pastime with the British royalty and nobility, and dating from the medieval era, land was parcelled off and put aside for the leisurely pursuits of hunting. These originated as royal forests and chase land, eventually evolving into deer parks, or sometimes into the Royal Parks if owned by the royal family. The ownership of these estates for hunting was in practice strictly restricted until the 19th century when legal changes to game hunting meant the nobility, gentry and other wealthy families could purchase land for the purposes of hunting. At the administrative centre of these sporting estates is usually a sporting lodge. These are also often known as shooting or hunting estates.

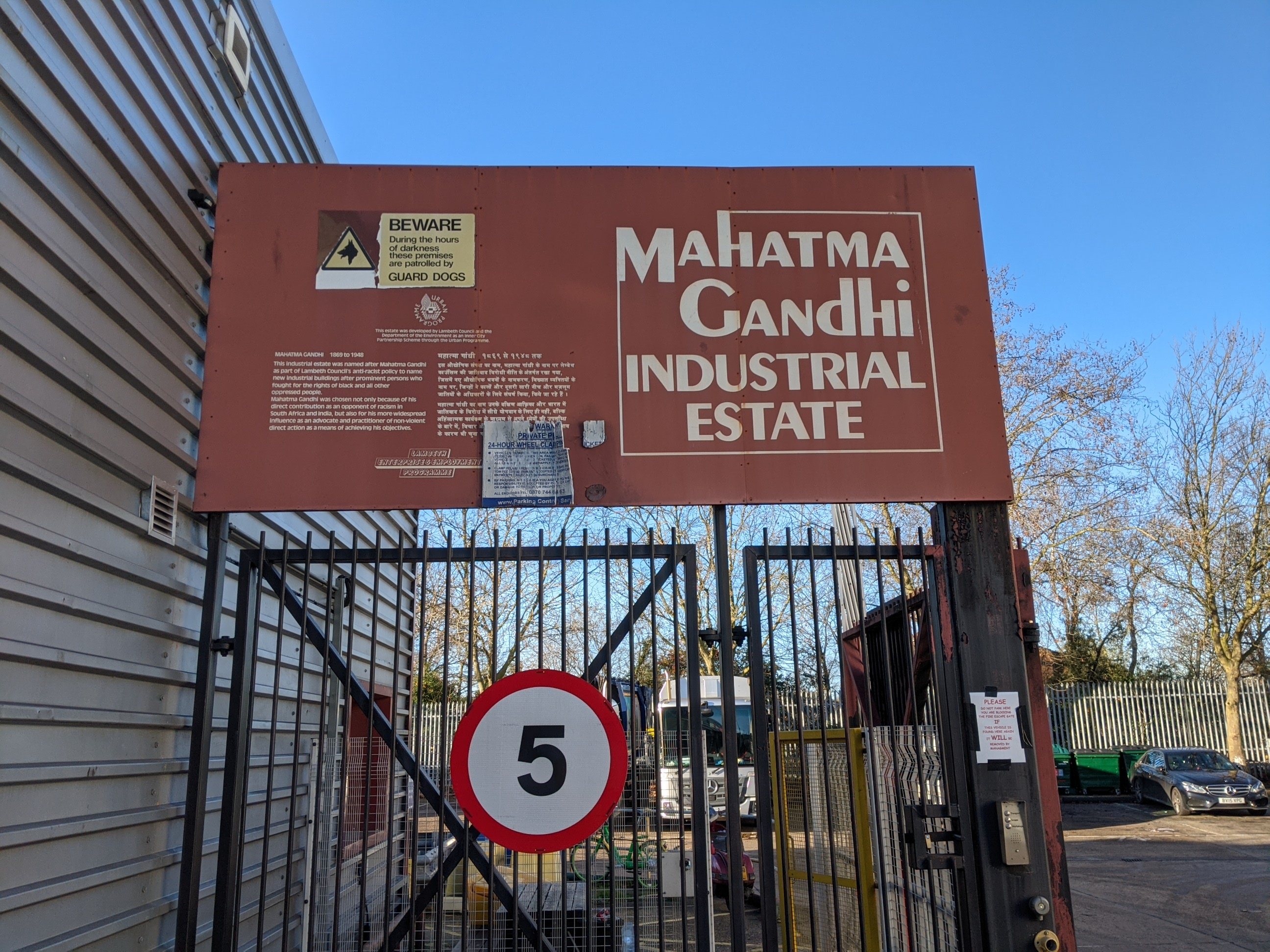
A modern industrial estate in Lambeth, London

=== Other uses ===
In modern British English, the term "estate" has been generalised to any large parcel of land under single ownership, such as a housing estate or industrial estate.

== In the United States ==
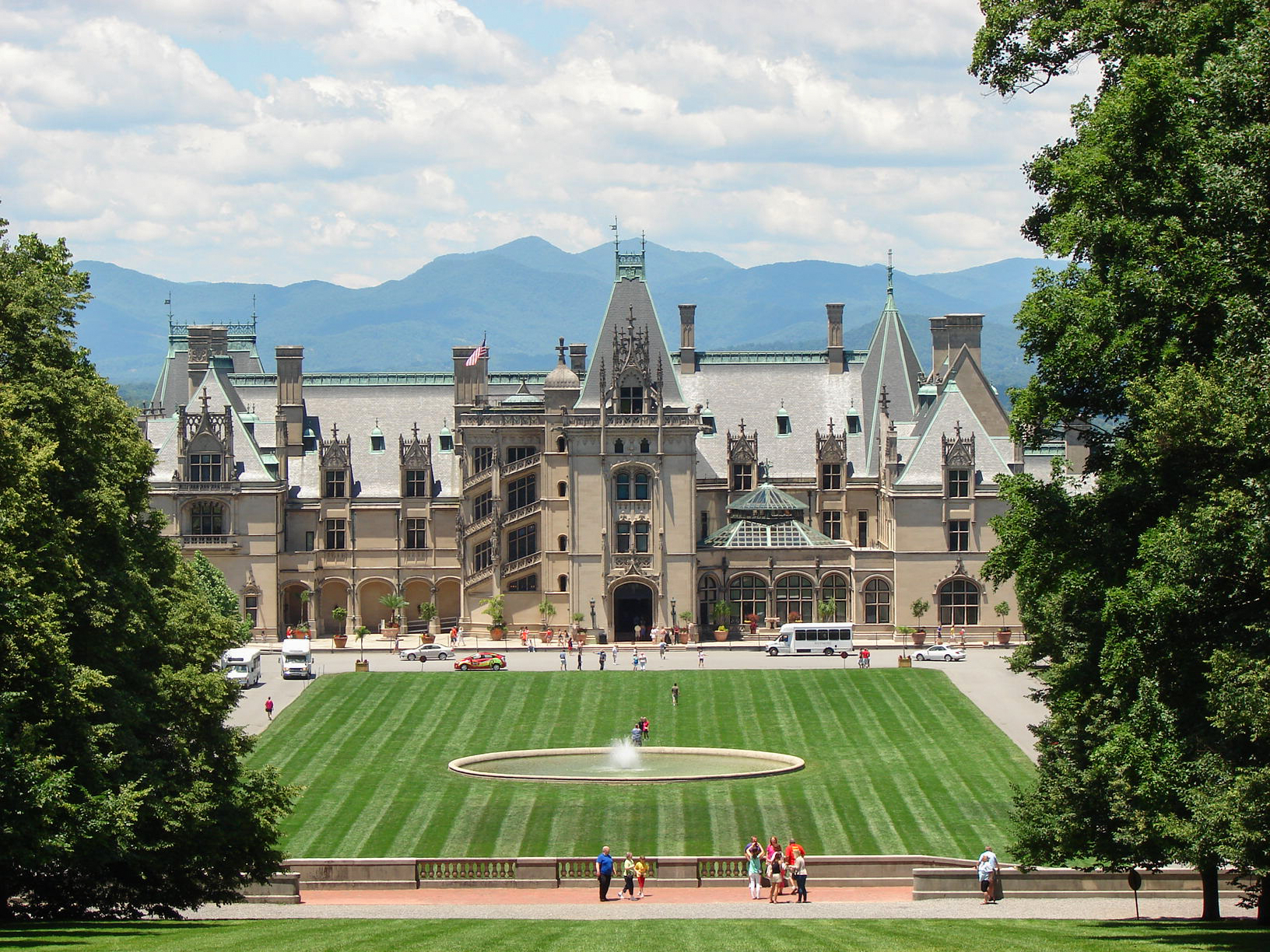
Biltmore Estate, Asheville, North Carolina

Large country estates were traditionally found in New York's Long Island, and Westchester County, the Philadelphia Main Line, Maine's Bar Harbor on Mount Desert Island, and other affluent East Coast enclaves; and the San Francisco Bay Area, early Beverly Hills, California, Montecito, California, Santa Barbara, California and other affluent West Coast enclaves. All these regions had strong traditions of large agricultural, grazing, and productive estates modeled on those in Europe. However, by the late 1940s and early 1950s, many of these estates had been demolished and subdivided, in some cases resulting in suburban villages named for the former owners, as in Baxter Estates, New York.

An important distinction between the United States and England is that "American country estates, unlike English ones, rarely, if ever, supported the house." American estates have always been about "the pleasures of land ownership and the opportunity to enjoy active, outdoor pursuits." Although some American estates included farms, they were always in support of the larger recreational purpose.

Today, large houses on lots of at least several acres in size are often referred to as "estates", in a contemporary updating of the word's usage. Most contemporary American estates are not large enough to include significant amounts of self-supporting productive agricultural land, and the money for their improvement and maintenance usually comes from fortunes earned in other economic sectors besides agriculture. They are distinguished from ordinary middle-class American houses by sheer size, as well as their landscaping, gardens, outbuildings, and most importantly, recreational structures (e.g., tennis courts and swimming pools). This usage is the predominant connotation of "estate" in contemporary American English (when not preceded by the word "real"), which is why "industrial estate" sounds like an oxymoron to Americans, as few wealthy persons would deliberately choose to live next to factories.

Traditional American estates include:

- Biltmore, Asheville, North Carolina; estate of George Washington Vanderbilt II
- Hearst Castle, Central Coast of California; estate of William Randolph Hearst
- Castle Hill, Ipswich, Massachusetts; estate of Richard Teller Crane Jr.
- Hillside Farm, Northport, Maine; estate of Ira M. Cobe
- Meadow Farm, East Islip, New York; estate of H. B. Hollins (demolished)
- Westbrook, Great River, New York; estate of William Bayard Cutting
- Coe Hall, Oyster Bay, New York; estate of William R. Coe
- Indian Neck Hall, Oakdale, New York; estate of Frederick Gilbert Bourne
- Inisfada, Manhasset, New York; estate of Nicholas Brady
- Idle Hour, Oakdale, New York; estate of William Kissam Vanderbilt
- Oheka Castle, Cold Spring Harbor, New York; estate of Otto Hermann Kahn
- Harold Lloyd Estate, 'Greenacres' Beverly Hills, California; estate of Harold Lloyd
- Filoli, Woodside, California; estate of William Bowers Bourn II.
- Riven Rock, Montecito, California; estate of Stanley and Katharine McCormick (demolished)
- Carolands, Hillsborough, California; estate of Harriett Pullman Carolan (daughter of George Pullman)
- Dumbarton Oaks, Georgetown, Washington, D.C.; estate of the Woods—Bliss Family, landscape architecture by Beatrix Farrand

== See also ==
- English country house
- Estate map
- Finca
- Gentry
- Hacienda
- Patroon
- Real estate
- Real estate business
- Real estate development
- Real estate bubble
- Shōen
- Villa
