= Ira M. Cobe =

American investor and financier (1866–1931)

- Born: October 29, 1866
- Died: July 9, 1931 (aged 64)
- Education: Boston University
- Occupations: Businessman, investment banker, lawyer

Ira Maurice Cobe (October 29, 1866 – July 9, 1931) was an American lawyer, investment banker, financier, art collector, and early automobile investor, known for his influence on Chicago’s transportation infrastructure and early American auto racing. He co‑founded the investment firm Cobe & McKinnon and later led key street‑rail and utility companies including the Chicago City Railway Company, Calumet & South Chicago Railway, Hammond, Whiting & East Chicago Railway, and Chicago Elevated Railroads. Cobe sponsored the Cobe Trophy Race (1909–1910) a precursor to the Indianapolis 500.

== Early life and education ==
Ira Maurice Cobe was born in Boston, Massachusetts, on October 29, 1866, the son of Mark H. and Eva (Morris) Cobe. He attended Boston public schools and earned a law degree from Boston University School of Law. He was admitted to the bar in June 1888 and practiced law in Boston. He married Anne Elizabeth Watts in 1892.

== Chicago career ==
In 1892, Cobe relocated to Chicago and established the investment firm Cobe & McKinnon.

The firm secured Eastern financing for Midwestern infrastructure projects and acquired a variety of commercial interests . He later helped form and became president of the Assets Realization Company.

Cobe held prominent roles: chairman of Chicago City Railway Company and board member for Calumet & South Chicago Railway, Hammond, Whiting & East Chicago Railway, and Chicago Elevated Railroads. He also served as director at Chicago Title & Trust, National Bank of the Republic, and Financial Corporation of America, and led the merger of Chicago South Side Traction lines into the Chicago City and Connecting Railways.

A contemporary of utilities magnate Samuel Insull, Cobe was considered part of a powerful network of executives—known informally as the "Big Five"—who oversaw several major transportation and utility enterprises in the city.

== Automobile Racing ==
An early investor in automobile racing, Cobe served as president of the Chicago Automobile Club, and sat on the Cup Commission for the Vanderbilt Cup Race. He sponsored the Cobe Trophy Race, one of the first long-distance car races in the U.S. The 1909 race, held on Indiana public roads, was won by Louis Chevrolet. The 1910 race, at Indianapolis Motor Speedway, was won by Joe Dawson. Both are considered precursors to the Indianapolis 500.

== Maine estate ==
In 1909, Cobe acquired 100 acres in Northport, Maine in the village of Bayside to build a mansion, Oak Hall (also known as Hillside Farm), designed by Benjamin H. Marshall of Marshall and Fox and landscaped by Warren H. Manning. Completed circa 1914, it featured a two-story Aeolian organ and served as a venue for cultural and social events. Cobe reputedly filled the house with over half a million dollars in fine art.

Cobe served as the first President of the Northport Village Corporation from 1915 until 1927.

== Death ==
Anne Elizabeth Cobe died in New York City in 1928. Ira Cobe died on July 9, 1931, at Oak Hall.
