= Bayside Historic District (Northport, Maine) =

Historic district in Maine, United States

- U.S. National Register of Historic Places
- U.S. Historic district
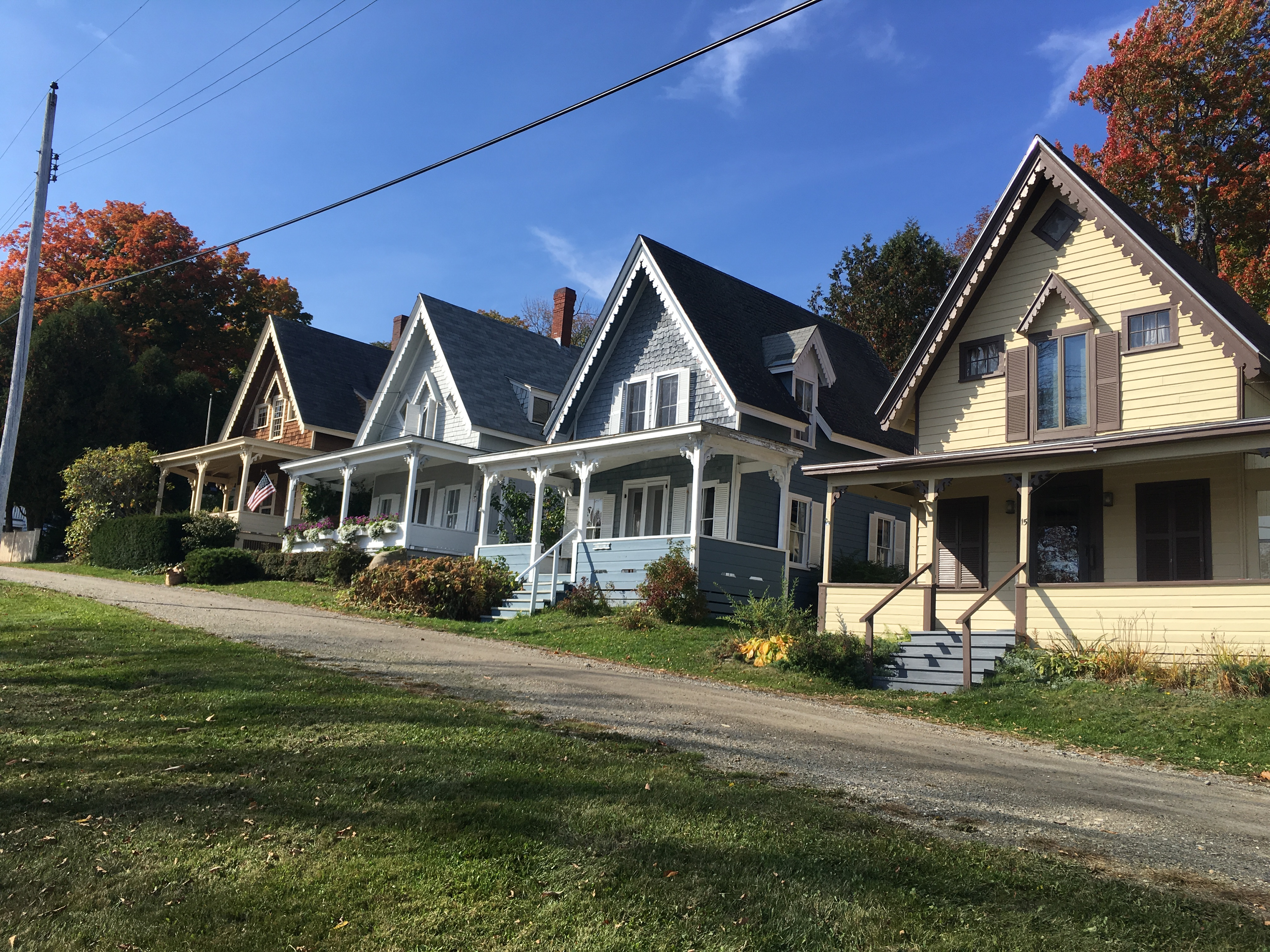
- Park Row

- Location within Maine Location within the United States
- Location: Roughly bounded by Penobscot Bay, Clinton Ave., George St., and Bay View Park, Bayside, Maine
- Coordinates: 44°22′49″N 68°58′6″W
- Area: 30 acres (12 ha)
- Built: 1850
- Architect: Multiple
- Architectural style: Gothic Revival, Queen Anne, Bungalow/craftsman
- NRHP reference No.: 96001477
- Added to NRHP: December 30, 1996

The Bayside Historic District encompasses the historic core of a former religious summer camp meeting community in Northport Village (also known as Bayside), which sits entirely within the town of Northport, Maine, USA. It includes the original grounds of the Northport Wesleyan Grove Camp Meeting, established in 1848, with most of surviving architecture built between about 1870 and 1920. It is the largest surviving such area in the state, and was listed on the National Register of Historic Places in 1996. It is now the heart of the Bayside village, a secular seaside summer resort community.

== Description and history ==
The Northport Camp Meeting has its origins in the 1848 purchase of land on the shore of Penobscot Bay, which was transferred to a formal organization in 1850, made up of 23 Methodist churches in Knox and Waldo Counties. The early years of the camp meeting are poorly documented; it is during this time that some of the features of the grounds, including Auditorium Park, were laid out. Accommodations in those years was in boarding houses and tents, none of which have survived. In 1873, the organization was formally chartered by the state, and it acquired more land, with an eye toward developing more permanent infrastructure, including cottages for attendees. By 1878, more than 100 cottages had been built on the association's grounds, a road network laid out, and sewerage services provided. The camp meeting declined in popularity in the 1920s and 1930s and was dissolved in 1937.

The district is centered on the waterfront of Penobscot Bay and extends inland as far as George Street. It is bounded at the northwest by Clinton Street and North Avenue, and on the southeast by Sea Street. Most of the buildings in the district are small single story or 1-1/2 story wood frame cottages, many with vernacular Gothic Revival styling. Typical features include bargeboard on the gables, board-and-batten siding, and decorative sawn details on porches and other trim elements. An 1885 store and bakery stand on Clinton Avenue, and the Bayside Inn on Bay Street (c. 1900-20) is the only surviving hotel building from the period. Auditorium Park, the traditional centerpiece of the camp meeting community, is where its auditorium stood until it was demolished in 1936, and has been retained as a public park, along with several other smaller parks.

== Village government ==
In 1915, the former campground was incorporated by the Private and Special Laws of the Maine State Legislature as the Northport Village Corporation with rights to tax and govern its territory. Chicago financier and early automobile enthusiast Ira M. Cobe, who had earlier built an estate at Hillside Farm, served as president of the Northport Village Corporation from 1915-1927. Today the village corporation is overseen by a board of Overseers and President.

== See also ==
- National Register of Historic Places listings in Waldo County, Maine
- Wesleyan Grove Campmeeting Association Records
- Northport Village Corporation
