= Marshall and Fox =

American architectural firm

Practice information
- Founders: Benjamin H. Marshall; Charles E. Fox
- Founded: 1905
- Dissolved: 1926
- Location: Chicago, Illinois, U.S.

Marshall and Fox was a United States architectural firm based in Chicago from 1905 to 1926. The principals, Benjamin H. Marshall and Charles E. Fox, designed a number of significant buildings of many types in Chicago and other cities, but they were best known for luxury hotels and apartment buildings.

== Partners ==
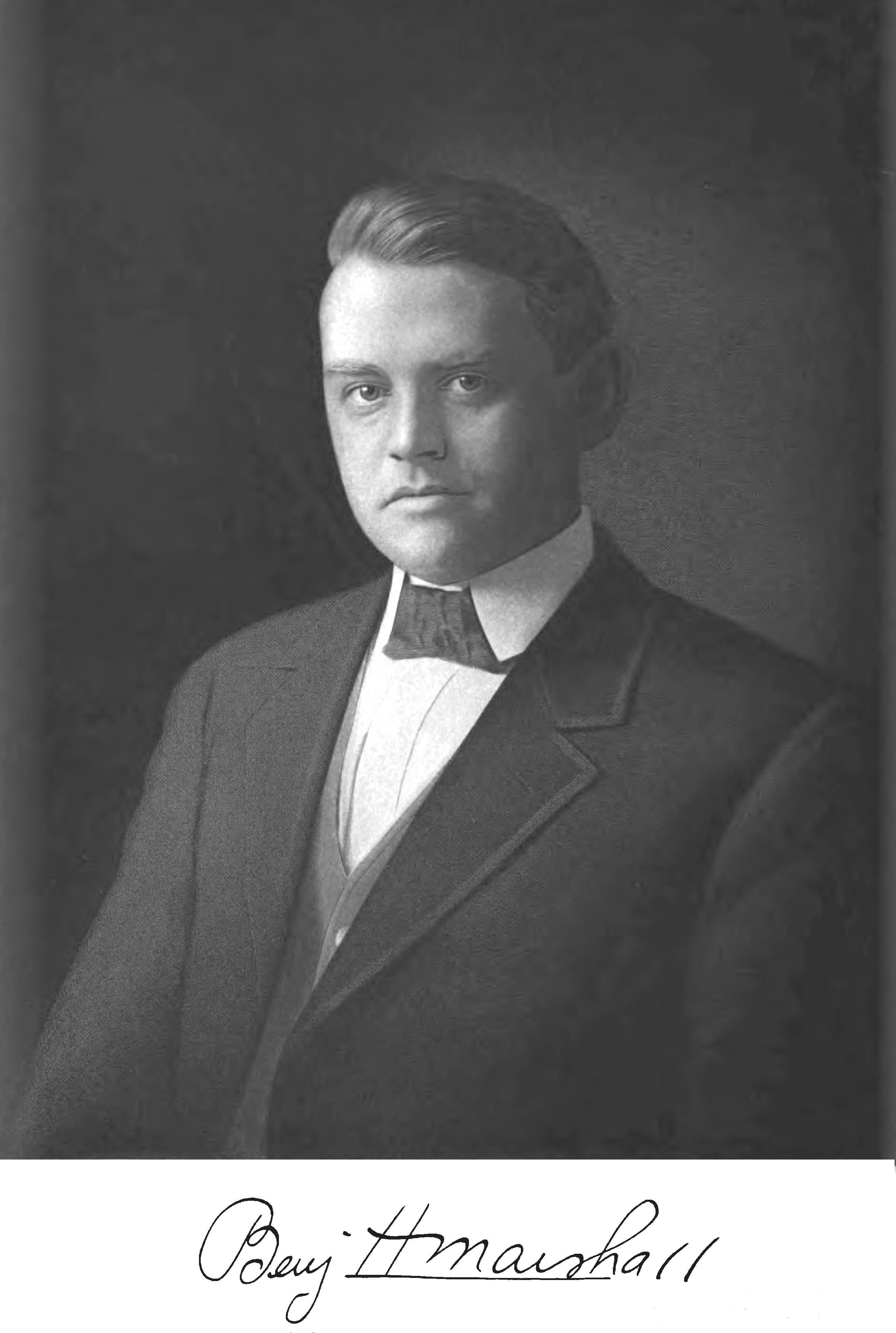
Benjamin Marshall c. 1919

=== Benjamin Howard Marshall ===
Benjamin H. Marshall (May 5, 1874 – June 19, 1944) was a native of Chicago. His formal education did not extend beyond his years at a private preparatory academy, the Harvard School, in then-suburban Kenwood. Impressed by the buildings being erected for the World's Columbian Exposition of 1893 near his south side home, the young Marshall decided on a career in architecture. At the age of 19, he became an apprentice in the firm of Marble and Wilson and two years later, at the time of Marble's death, he was named a full-fledged partner. In 1905, he established his own practice hiring MIT-trained architect and engineer, Charles Eli Fox.. One of his earliest commissions was destroyed a month after its completion in an event remembered as one of Chicago's worst disasters, the Iroquois Theater Fire of 1903.

Marshall's career was only temporarily affected by the disaster, and from 1905 to 1925, the firm of Marshall and Fox went on to build many of the most iconic structures in Chicago. His work was also part of the architecture event in the art competition at the 1928 Summer Olympics. Marshall was handsome and wealthy and entrepreneurial, and he has been described as a cross between the fictional playboy Jay Gatsby and real-life showman Florenz Ziegfeld. Although not an original stylist, nor great structural innovator, he was a creative re-worker of style in popular building projects. After Fox's death in 1926, Marshall continued to operate the firm alone until his retirement in the 1930s when he was bankrupted by the Great Depression. He later moved into one of his buildings, the Drake Hotel, where he continued to design several of its interiors.

Marshall designed and constructed an extravagant mansion for himself in Wilmette, Illinois.

=== Charles Eli Fox ===
Charles Fox (July 1, 1870 – October 31, 1926) was born in Reading, Pennsylvania. After studying architecture at Massachusetts Institute of Technology he moved to Chicago in 1891. He was employed by the noted firm of Holabird & Roche, working primarily as a specialist in steel construction. The final 21 years of his career from 1905 to 1926 were spent in the partnership with Marshall. He was the firm's construction specialist and project manager.

== Works ==
The Steger Building

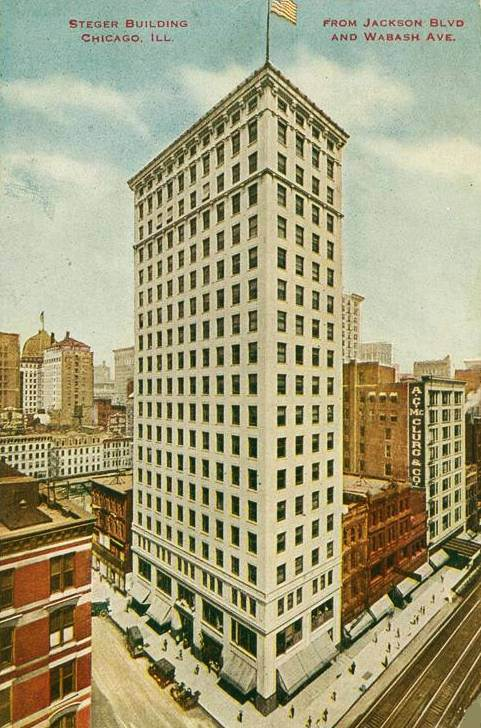
The Steger Building, 28 East Jackson Blvd., Chicago. John Steger built this nineteen story skyscraper in downtown Chicago in 1910 to create a high-profile focus for Steger & Sons Piano Manufacturing Co. The building was the first high-rise building designed by Marshall and Fox and is today a designated Chicago landmark.

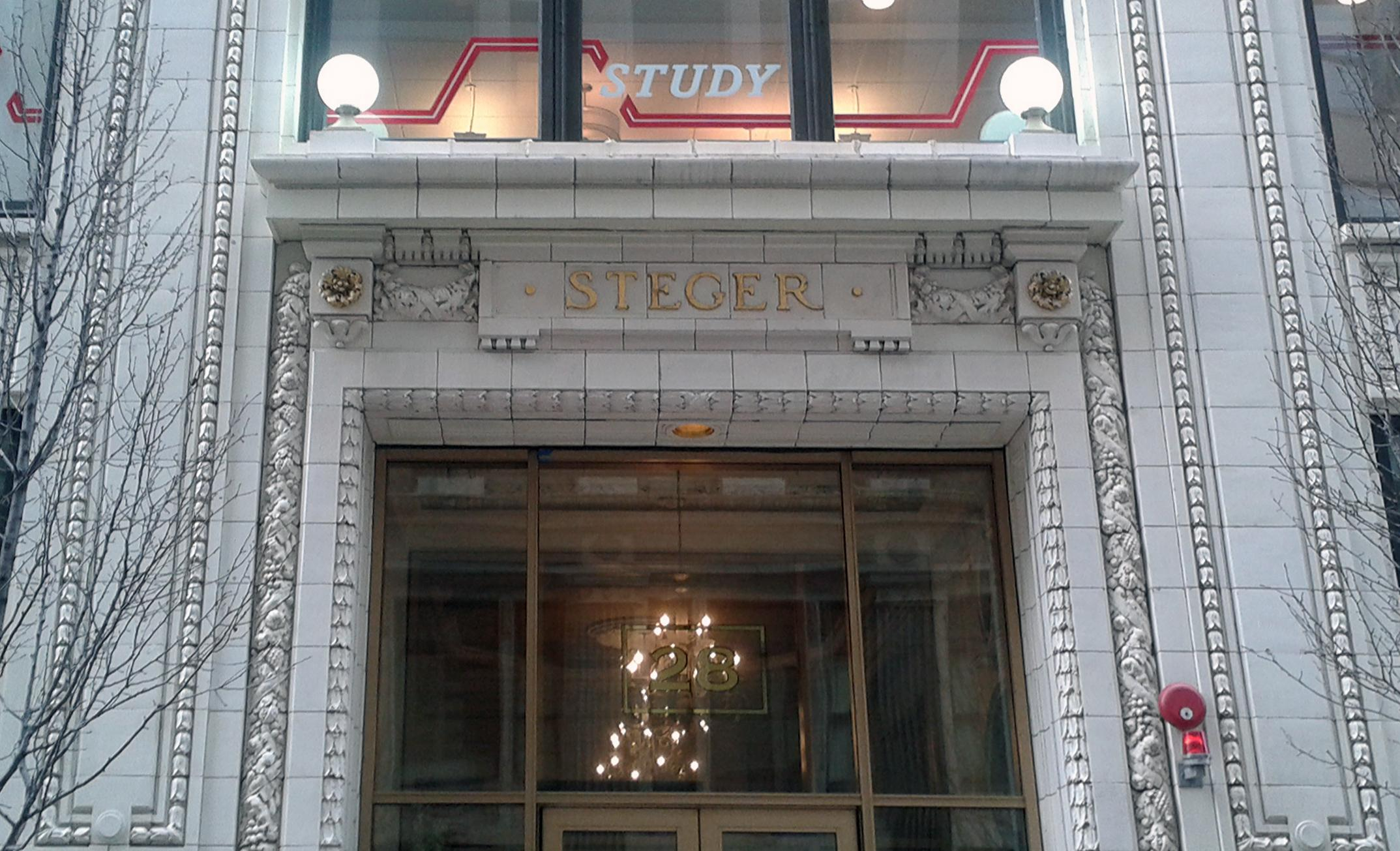
Main entrance

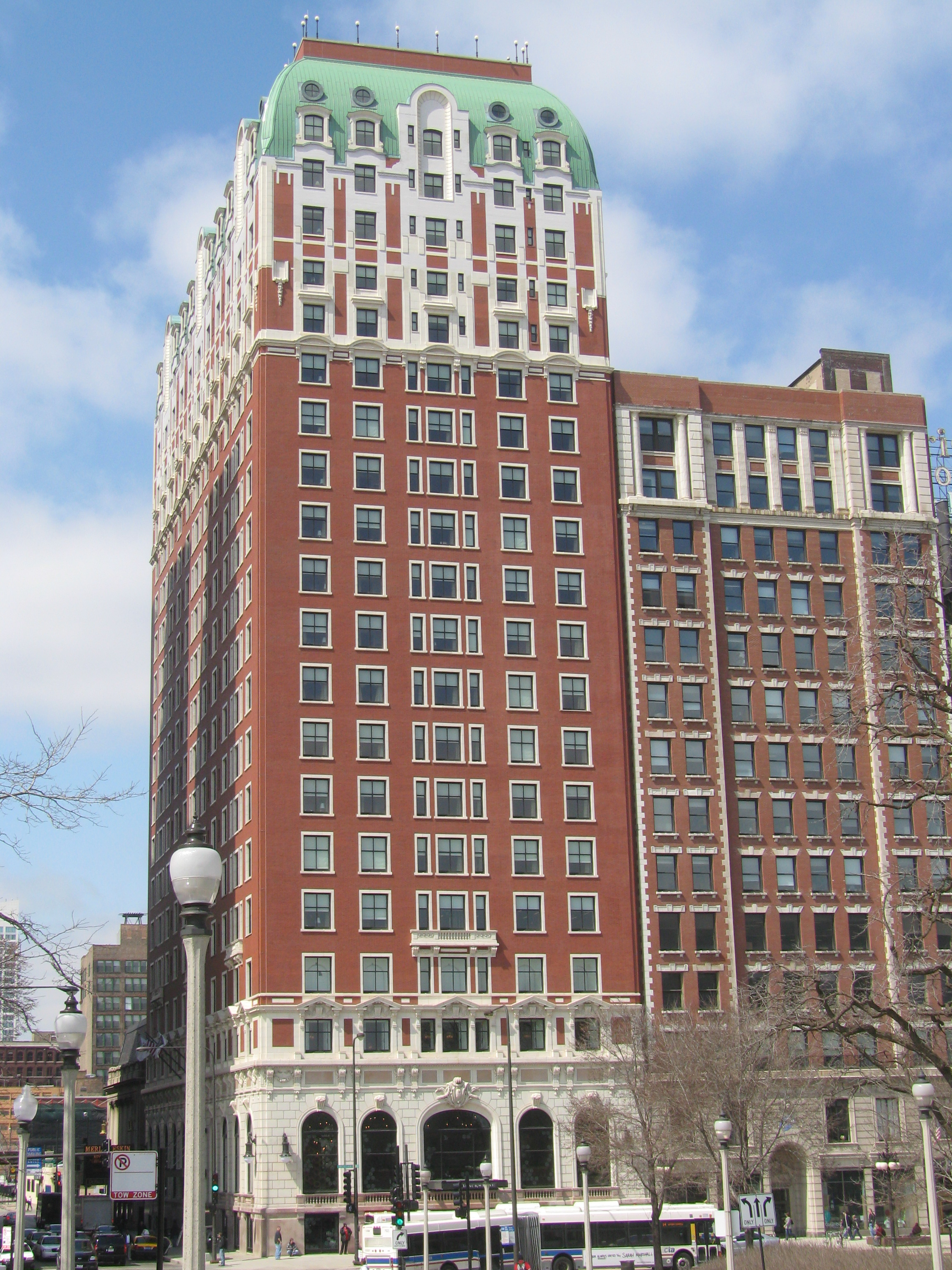
The Blackstone Hotel in Chicago

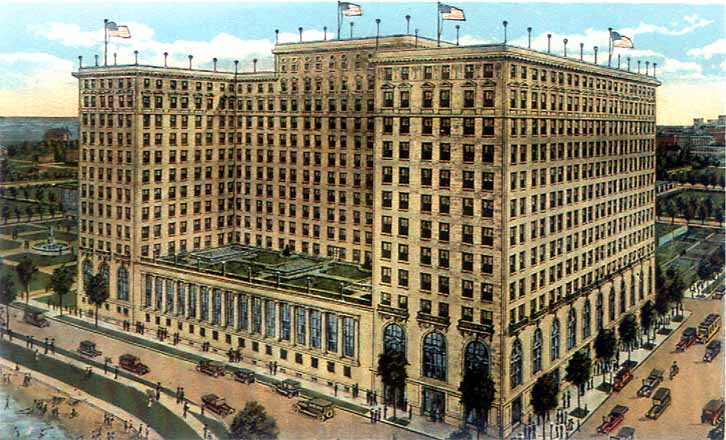
The Drake Hotel (Chicago)

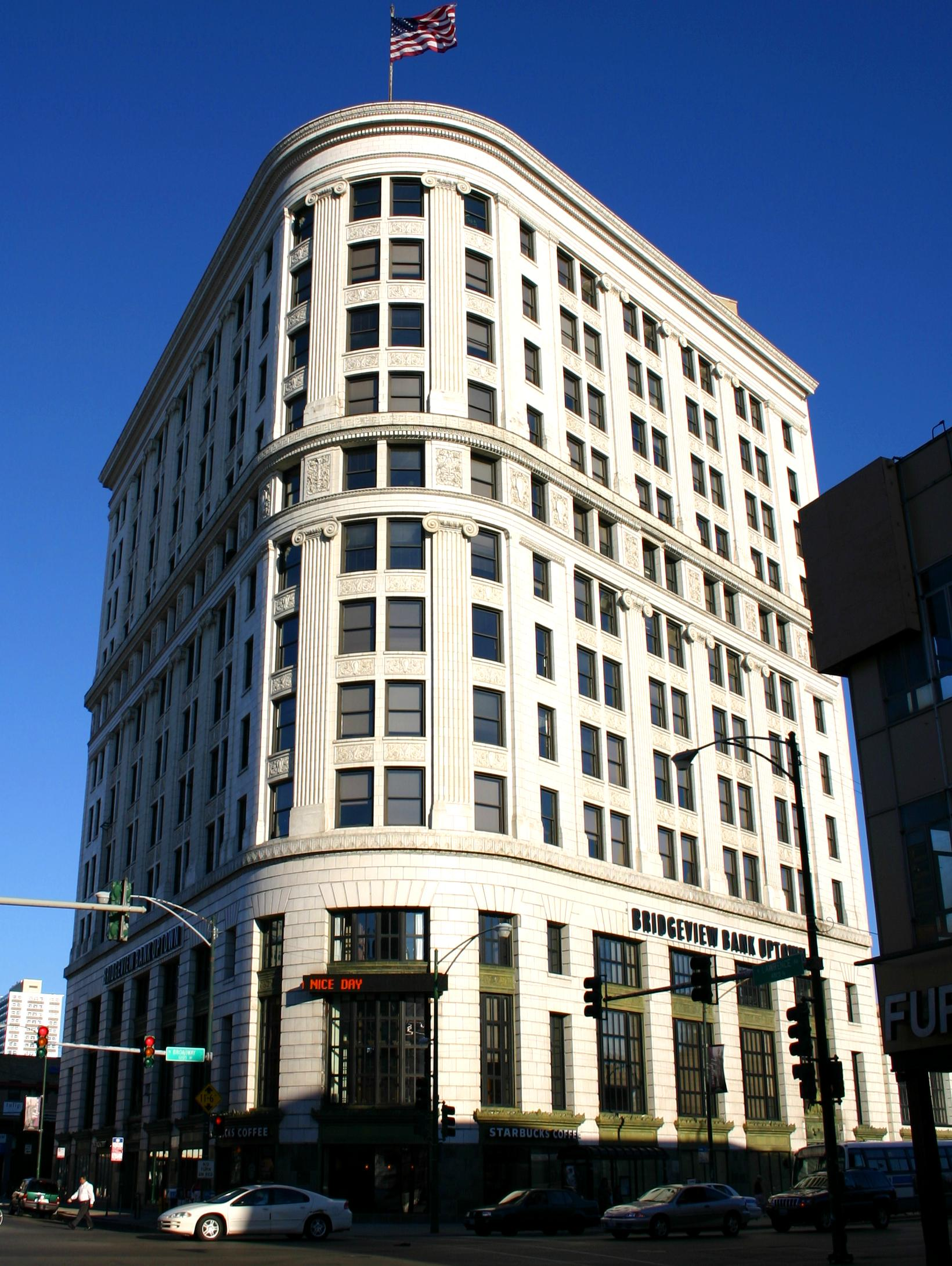
Sheridan Trust and Savings Bank Building

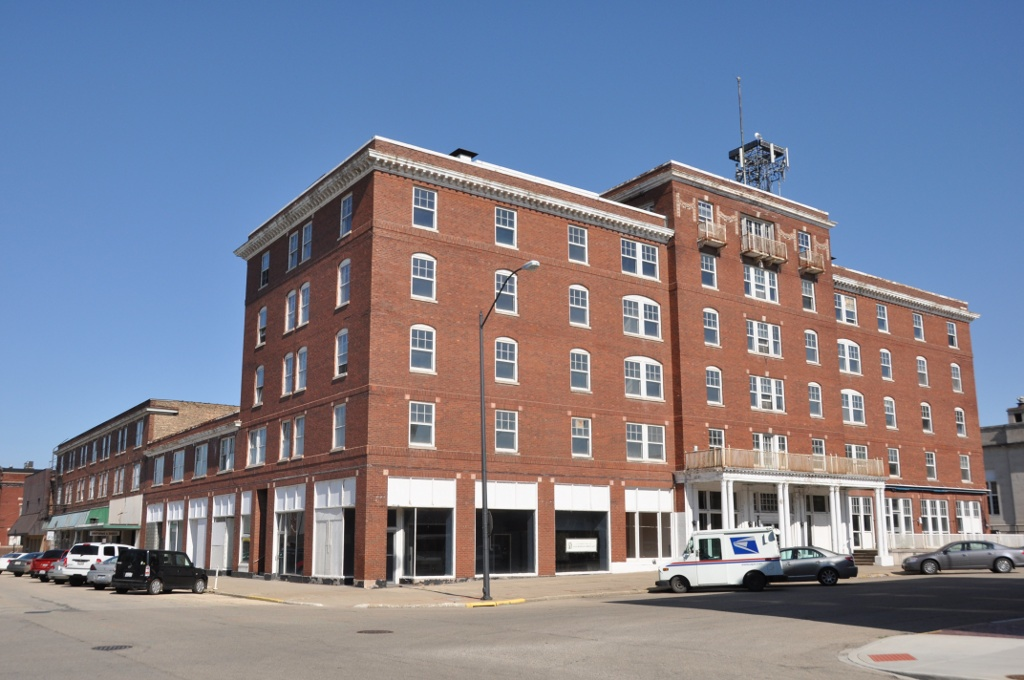
Hotel Kaskaskia

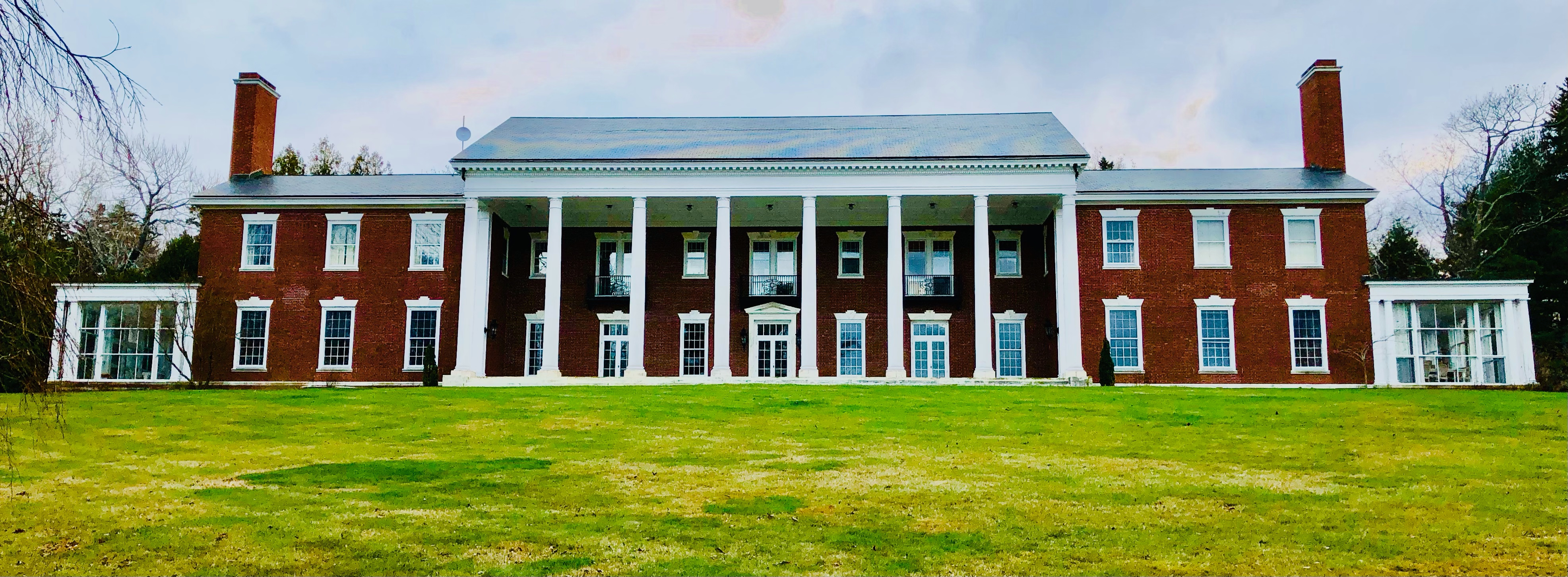
Oak Hall, also known as Cobe Estate, in Northport, Maine

Beginning in 1906, Marshall and Fox designed a series of buildings for the South Shore Country Club, the last of which was a large Mediterranean revival style clubhouse erected in 1916. This building still stands, and has been converted by the City of Chicago into the South Shore Cultural Center. The clubhouse is listed on the National Register of Historic Places.

One of the firm's most noted works is the 1910 Blackstone Hotel, also on the National Register, along with the adjacent Blackstone Theater, now the Merle Reskin Theatre which was acquired by DePaul University in 1988 as part of their Loop Campus.

Other major buildings from the era include Stewart Apartments, the Drake Hotel, the Mayslake Peabody Estate (Oak Brook, Illinois), the Park Place Hotel in Traverse City, the Sheridan Trust and Savings Bank Building, and the Lake Shore Trust and Savings Bank Building, all in Chicago, plus the Schaff Building in Philadelphia, as well as the Edgewater Gulf Hotel and in Biloxi, Mississippi, a sister project to their Edgewater Beach Hotel in Chicago and the Fitzgerald Theater in St. Paul, Minnesota. The firm also designed Kaskaskia Hotel in LaSalle County, Illinois, and the Cobe Estate in Northport, Maine.

The firm designed many large residences on Chicago's North Shore, including 681 Lincoln Avenue in Winnetka, Illinois (briefly shown as "Old Man" Marley's home in the Home Alone movie) and 615 Lincoln Avenue in Glencoe, Illinois.

== Successor firms ==
After Marshall's retirement, in 1935 the firm became Walton and Kegley until 1950. From 1950 until 1969 the firm was known as Walton and Walton. The firm's papers are archived at the University of Texas.
