= Seven Houses on Lake Shore Drive District =

Coordinates: 41°54′20.2″N 87°37′31.0″W

- Interactive map of the Seven Houses on Lake Shore Drive District area

General information
- Location: Chicago, Illinois,

Design and construction
- Architects: Benjamin Marshall; Holabird & Roche; Howard Van Doren Shaw; McKim, Mead & White.

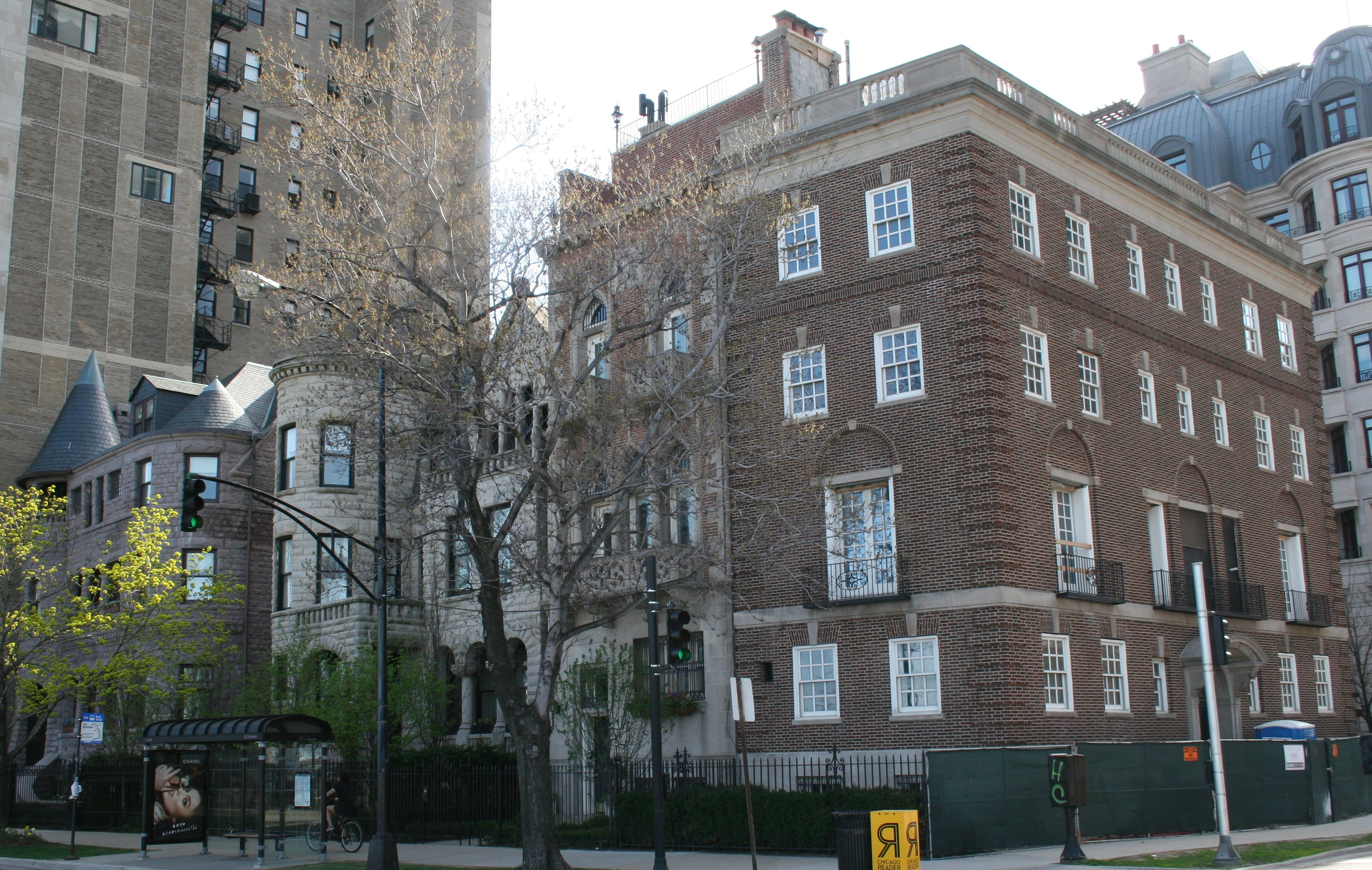
Southernmost four of the seven houses in the Seven Houses on Lake Shore Drive District

The Seven Houses on Lake Shore Drive District is a historic district in Chicago, Illinois, United States. The district was built between 1889 and 1917 by various architects including Benjamin Marshall, Holabird & Roche, Howard Van Doren Shaw, and McKim, Mead & White. It was designated a Chicago Landmark on June 28, 1989.
