= Warren H. Manning =

American landscape architect (1860–1938)

- Born: November 7, 1860
- Died: February 5, 1938 (aged 77)
- Occupations: Landscape Architect, Urban Planner

Warren Henry Manning (November 7, 1860–February 5, 1938) was an American landscape designer and promoter of the informal and naturalistic "wild garden" approach to garden design. In his designs, Manning emphasized pre-existing flora through a process of selective pruning to create a "spatial structure and character." (Karson, 1997) An advocate for the conservation of the American landscape, Manning was a key figure in the formation of the American Society of Landscape Architects and a proponent of the National Park System.

== History ==
Warren H. Manning was born in Reading, Massachusetts, to Jacob Warren Manning, who owned and operated a nursery. It was here that Manning developed an extensive knowledge of plant materials. Jacob Manning nourished his son's interest in horticulture by including him on botanical expeditions and visits to other nurseries including the Downing nursery, owned by Charles Downing, brother of Andrew Jackson Downing (Karson, 2000). Manning also credited his mother, Lydia, a watercolorist, for his appreciation of the smaller details found in nature by exposing him to the home garden, pointing out "birds, flowers, toads, butterflies and beetles (Karson, 1997). Manning wrote that he "modeled in sand and mud hills, valleys, tunnels, houses, roads, and gardens with pools" (Karson, 1997). In 1884, this exposure, coupled with the internship experience at his father's nursery, led to his desire to make "America a finer place in which to live" (Karson, 1997) and to choose landscape design as a profession.

By 1884, the 26-year-old Manning was designing landscapes for James Warren Manning's customers. During his time as an apprentice, Manning furthered his plant knowledge while attending Harvard's Olmsted designed Arnold Arboretum for Saturday study sessions, foreshadowing what would eventually be one of Manning's greatest influences. During this time, Manning also found time to go on plant hunting trips in the White Mountains (Stan Hywet Hall and Gardens 2007).

In 1885, Manning married his wife, Nellie Hamblin Pratt. Three years later, he left his father's nursery pursuing his goal, seeking the company of the "most eminent man in the landscape profession" (Stan Hywet Hall and Gardens 2007). His searching landed him in the office of one of the most influential landscape architects of his time; Frederick Law Olmsted.

Water Trends of Birmingham and other parts of Alabama drawn by Warren Manning.

Sewer data collected at Birmingham, Alabama to be used in the city plan by Warren Manning.

Here Manning's extensive knowledge of plant materials was utilized in the planting designs of such projects as the Chicago Columbian Exposition of 1893. Manning was responsible for the final planting scheme and installation of the horticultural displays of the park (Karson, 1997). At the Olmsted office, Manning also worked on the planting design of the Biltmore Estate of George Vanderbilt in Asheville, North Carolina and extensive park designs in Milwaukee, Buffalo, Rochester, Chicago, Trenton and Washington, D.C. Initially signed on as planting supervisor, his extensive horticultural knowledge quickly expanded his function at the firm, and during his eight-year employment, he participated in 125 projects in 22 states. While working under Olmsted, Manning gained invaluable experience in planned industrial settings, which would play a key role in his later career. While working with Charles Eliot, a partner at the firm, on the Boston Metropolitan Park System, Manning was exposed to thorough and extensive research of a site and the method of overlaying sketches of topography, roads, water features, etc. over sketches of vegetation (Karson 2000). This method of resource-planning would be used over and over in Manning's career.

In 1896, Manning left the Olmsted office to begin his own business on Tremont Street near the Boston Common. Aware that Frederick Olmsted Sr. would pass his business on to both of his sons and partner Charles Eliot, Manning decided to start out on his own (Karson, 2000). When Manning left the firm, Olmsted allowed him to take about 15 jobs with him; one of these clients was William Gwinn Mather. Mather heartily supported Manning and would employ him on sixty design and planning projects throughout their lives including the design of his home near Cleveland, Ohio (Karson, 1997). Now completely in charge, Manning was able to pursue designs of styles that interested him. This was largely an 18th-century English romantic style, adapted to the American landscape. The product of which was a sprawling, natural design, littered with native plants (Stan Hywet Hall and Gardens 2007). Charles Gillette served as an apprentice in his office in 1909-1911.

City plan of Birmingham, Alabama drawn by Warren Manning.

In 1919, Manning's talents took him to Birmingham, Alabama, where he worked on a new design for the city. He recommended a radical resource-based plan which included "multiple neighborhood-based centers determined by available resources" (Karson, 2001). He also makes note of the importance of parks throughout the city stating that "the cities that are best designed have about one-eighth of their area in parks and about one acre to 75 people" (Manning, 1919). This approach was in direct contrast to the then-popular City Beautiful movement which emphasized monumental civic centers and Beaux Arts architecture style public buildings (Karson, 2001). The architectural design of the Chicago Columbian Exposition was based in the City Beautiful movement, but now, on his own, Manning decided on a different course following his own landscape theories which were based on the naturally available resources. This idea was the basis for his creation of the "wild garden" which he applied to many of his landscape designs.

During his career, Manning worked on more than 1700 projects including a number of park designs, private estates, city planning, college campuses, subdivisions, golf courses, and government and community projects. Manning's brother joined him as a business partnership between 1901 and 1904. Bryant Fleming (1877-1946) worked for him during this period. Together they created a revolutionary park design for Harrisburg, Pennsylvania utilizing a new drainage and sanitation system. During the Depression years Manning's practice did not do well and by the 1930s he was receiving very few commissions. In 1938, Manning died of a heart attack at the age of seventy-eight (Karson, 2001). His remaining papers are collected at the University of Massachusetts Lowell and Iowa State University. A state forest located in Billerica, Massachusetts, on land he donated, is named for him.

== Manning's "wild gardens" ==
Early on in his career, Manning went against the then-popular formalistic approach to landscape design and emphasized a more naturalistic approach of native plants and naturalistic groupings. The formal gardens of the late nineteenth century relied heavily on a more symmetrical design and extensive use of ornament. Manning describes his wild gardening as "that form of floriculture which is concerned with planting in a nature-like manner colony of hardy plants that require a minimum of care" (Karson, 2001). In his early, unpublished essay "The Nature Garden," Manning writes:

I would have you give your thoughts to a new type of gardening wherein the Landscaper recognizes, first, the beauty of existing conditions and develops this beauty to the minutest detail by the elimination of material that is out of place in a development scheme by selective thinning, grubbing, and trimming, instead of by destroying all natural ground cover vegetation or modifying the contour, character, and water context of existing soil.

This idea of selective thinning and pruning was at the core of Manning's landscape theory. He celebrated the smallest details in the landscape, emphasizing lichens and fungi in his design, which was contrary to his counterparts and unusual for this time in landscape design.

== Gwinn: wild garden ==
In 1907, William Gwinn Mather, owner of Cleveland-Cliffs Iron Company, asked Manning, along with Charles A. Platt to design his property outside of Cleveland, Ohio. Manning and Platt were hired to work together, but often with conflicting landscape designs for the same property. Platt, a more formalist designer, emphasized paths, gates and other architectural elements while Manning based his designs on the "wild garden" approach (Karson, 1995). Manning inventoried the site's pre-existing plants, and with selective pruning and thinning, created graceful planting groupings and spaces. Manning also shipped plants in from neighboring states including wildflowers from Michigan and rhododendrons from North Carolina (Karson, 2004). In 1912, Mather bought another large piece of property adjacent to the Cleveland location, at which Manning designed another "wild garden".

Privately held since 2007, Gwinn is not open to the public.

== Notable contributions ==
In 1899, three years after leaving the firm of Olmsted Sr., Manning wrote Eliot, seeking help in creating a professional organization for landscape architects. Eliot, however, was more interested in creating a public association. The final product of this idea would become the American Civic Association. After this was founded, Manning returned to his desire to create a professional organization. With the help of the Olmsted Brothers, 11 charter members of the American Society of Landscape Architects met for the first time in 1899 in New York City. In 1914, Manning would serve as president (Karson 2000).

In addition to being an influential landscape architect, Manning was also an avid writer and proponent of the conservation of America's wilderness. As such, Manning worked on a large mapping project (1915-1916) and wrote a "National Plan" which advocated for the conservation of American's lands by establishing National and State Forest and Park systems.

Manning was responsible for the restoration of his family's early colonial homestead, the Manning Manse in Billerica, Massachusetts. In the 1890s, the property was in decline, and Manning led a carefully documented rehabilitation of the c. 1696 homestead. He occupied it as a summer home until his death. He also purchased large tracts of land surrounding the homestead, on which he maintained an office for a time. Much of this land is now for the core of Warren H. Manning State Forest.

== Projects ==
Residential

William Gwinn Mather-Cleveland, OH
F.A. and Gertrude Seiberling-Stan Hywet Hall and Gardens, Akron, OH, one of the finest examples of his work remaining, open to the public
Gustave Pabst- Milwaukee, WI
August and Adolphus Busch-St Louis, IL
Cyrus and Harriet McCormick-Lake Forest, IL
J.J. Borland-Camden, ME
Hill-Stead Museum, Farmington, Connecticut
Clement Griscom-Dolobran, Haverford, Pennsylvania.
Lewis Mountain, Charlottesville, Virginia
Cobe Estate, Northport, Maine (circa 1912-1915)

Park systems

Wilcox Park - Westerly, Rhode Island (Memorial and Library Association of Westerly), RI
Mackinac Island State Park, MI
Milwaukee, WI
Minneapolis, MN
Providence, RI
Louisville, KY
Cincinnati, OH
Flint, MI
Pennsylvania

Communities

Raleigh, North Carolina - Longview Gardens
Gwinn, Michigan
Mountain Brook, Alabama
Bellevue Park, Harrisburg, Pennsylvania
Warren, Arizona

Boulevards

Biscayne Boulevard, Miami, FL - Biscayne boulevard
