= Marshall/Goldblatt mansion =

Building in Wilmette, Illinois

Marshall/Goldblatt Mansion
- Pool inside of the enclosed tropical garden of the mansion
- Alternative names: Marshall mansion, Goldblatt mansion

General information
- Status: Demolished
- Type: Mansion (residence/studio)
- Architectural style: Spanish Colonial Revival
- Location: 612 Sheridan Road, Wilmette, Illinois
- Coordinates: 42°4′31.00″N 87°41′3.3″W
- Construction started: 1921
- Completed: 1924
- Demolished: 1949–1950
- Cost: Between $500,000 (equivalent to $9,025,187 in 2025) and $1,000,000 (equivalent to $18,050,373 in 2025)

Design and construction
- Architect: Benjamin Marshall

The Marshall/Goldblatt mansion (commonly known as the Marshall mansion or the Goldblatt mansion) refers to a demolished mansion that was formerly located on the shore of the Wilmette Harbor in Wilmette, Illinois at 612 Sheridan Road. The exterior of the forty-room pink stucco structure was built in the Spanish Colonial Revival style. Built between 1922 and 1924, the mansion was among the most extravagant mansions constructed in the North Shore suburbs of Chicago and was considered an unofficial landmark. The residence was designed by noted architect and hotel magnate Benjamin Marshall and constructed as his personal residence and studio. Amid the Great Depression, the mansion was sold in 1936 to Nathan Goldblatt (of Goldblatt's fortune). The mansion became abandoned after Nathan Goldblatt's widow moved out in 1947. The Goldblatt family offered to sell it to the village of Wilmette's government to serve as a community center. This offer was rejected, and the mansion was demolished between 1949 and 1950. The land was then purchased in 1951 by the Baháʼí Faith organization, whose North American continental temple is located across Sheridan Road. Today, all that remains of the palatial mansion are a pair of gates along Sheridan Road.

== Design and features ==
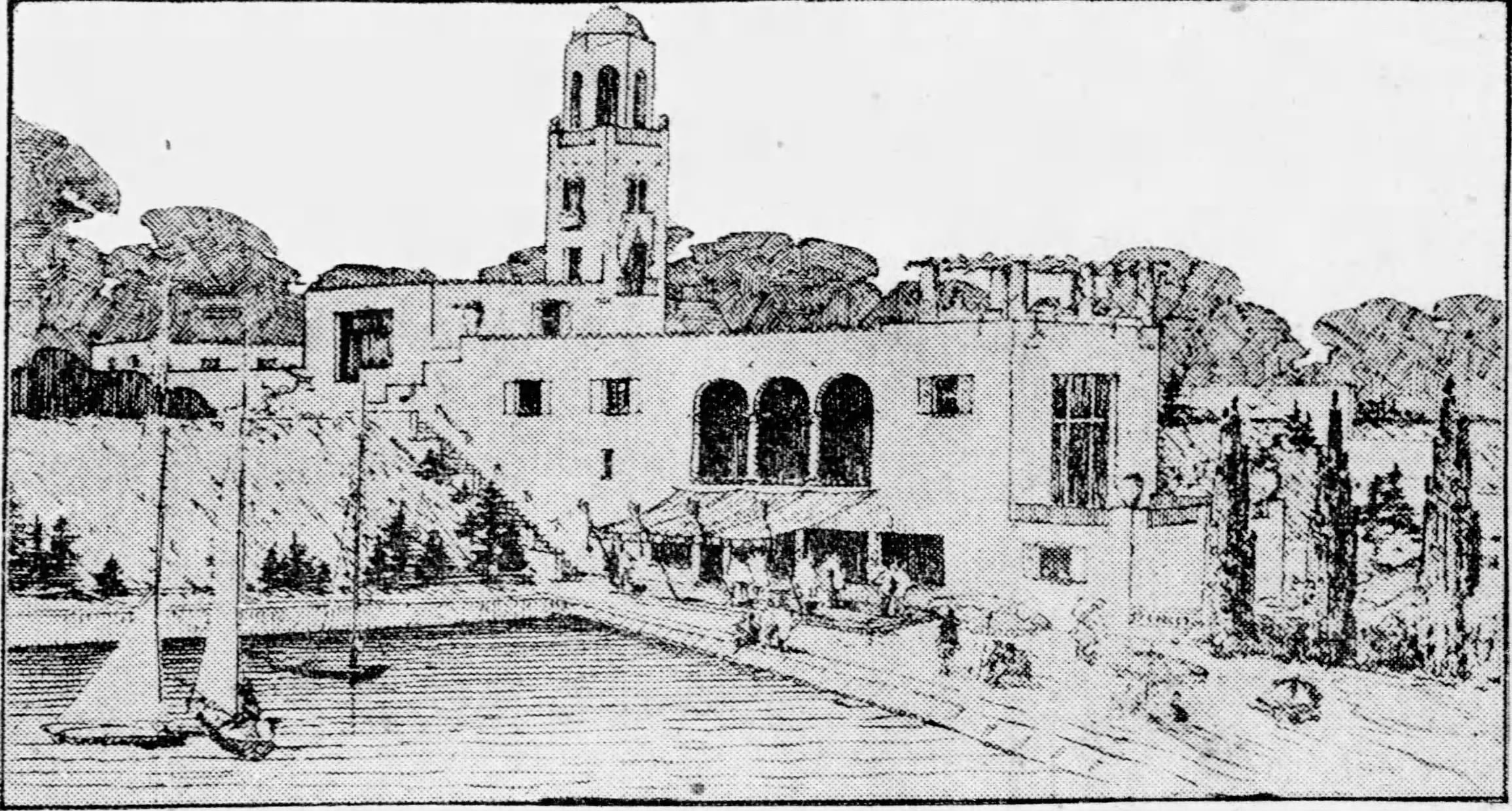
1921 architectural rendering of a view from Wilmette Harbor of the mansion as it was then-planned to look. The final design differed from this, however.

In 1921, Benjamin Marshall unveiled his plans to construct a palatial mansion to house his personal residence, his studio, as well as a quarters for the Sheridan Shores Club membership organization. The mansion would replace a temporary studio he had constructed on property he had overlooking Wilmette Harbor. A June 26, 1921 Chicago Tribune article wrote that the planned "elaborate Spanish-American type of building of pink stucco," would house, "one of the most elaborate and luxurious studios in the country." The original at that time was to feature a red tiled roof and a fifty-foot tower. Construction on a final design of the forty-room pink-stucco Spanish Colonial Revival was started that year and was completed in 1924.

The residence is one of the most extravagant residences ever built in the history of the North Shore suburbs of Chicago. The mansion's Spanish Colonial Revival exterior was somewhat simple, but the interior spaces and furnishings were immensely elaborate. The construction utilized concrete and steel. The mansion's interior featured hollow concrete columns which were polished in a manner to extremely convincingly mimic the appearance of marble. The mansion was built into a bluff so that only one of its three stories was visible at street level on its front. It was said to have cost somewhere between $500,000 and $1,000,000 to construct. Wilmette building permit records show that, in the years between its initial competition and its demolition, a further $113,000 of construction would be invested in the structure. The mansion was located along Sheridan Road on the south side of Wilmette Harbor along a bluff. Located on the east side of Sheridan Road, it stood across the road from the North American Baháʼí House of Worship. It was located at a curve in Sheridan Road near where the road crosses over the end of the North Shore Channel. Its street address was 612 Sheridan Road. The mansion became a well-known location, making it an unofficial landmark until it was torn down. In 1925, the Chicago Tribune hailed it as, "one of the sights of Chicago".

Loggia of mansion, circa 1928

The opulent mansion was designed as a place to hold entertain, featuring many exotic spaces in which Marshall could entertain guests. The extravagance of the mansion has even led to retrospective comparisons being made between Marshall and Jay Gatsby, the titular character of the F. Scott Fitzgerald novel The Great Gatsby, as well as Charles Foster Kane, the titular character of the film Citizen Kane (who, in the film, built an elaborate mansion named Xanadu). The mansion was so elaborate that, when Marshall hosted the Prince of Wales (later Edward VIII) at the mansion in October 1924 for what was planned to be a quick visit, the prince changed his plans and insisted on receiving a detailed tour of the entire mansion. Notable guests that Marshall hosted at the mansion included noted actors such as Ethel Barrymore, Fay Bainter, Richard Bennett, Ina Claire, Raymond Hitchcock, Ed Wynn, playwrights such as Noël Coward, conductors such as Leopold Stokowski, artists such as Frank O. Salisbury, travelers such as Burton Holmes, and sports celebrities such as Walter Hagen. Marshall decorated the mansion with rare art and furniture. The mansion was full of expensive imported furnishings and antiques, including doors imported from Agra, India carved window blinds imported from Madrid, Spain, a sedan chair imported from France, and a pair of 15th century European doors.

The mansion featured an enclosed tropical greenhouse featuring an indoor swimming pool with turquoise blue colored tiling. This greenhouse was a main space of the mansion, with the mansion's other rooms effectively wrapping around it. In the greenhouse, the pool was surrounded by tropical garden complete with palm trees. When he was furnishing the garden, Marshall commissioned a five-car train in order to transport to Wilmette the tropical plants for the greenhouse. The steel-framed greenhouse featured glass windows along its exterior which could be opened in the summer weather to open the greenhouse space up to the outdoors. These windows would automatically open at the push of a button. The greenhouse's tropical garden was inhabited by live monkeys.

Egyptian solarium, circa 1928

One of the mansion's most notable spaces was its Egyptian solarium. A key feature of this space was a table which rose through the floor, rising up from a butler's pantry beneath it, allowing the table to be set on the level below and raised to the solarium. This table could be raised and lowered at the press of a button. The Egyptian solarium featured a genuine ancient sarcophagus that had held an Egyptian mummy. One wall of the room entirely made of glass, while the opposite wall was occupied entirely by a 20-foot divan. Marshall considered this to be his favorite room in the mansion. The multiple glass walls of this room could be rolled back in order to provide occupants of the room with an unobstructed view of Wilmette Harbor.

Entrance to Chinese temple room

Interior of the Chinese temple room

Interior of the studio space, circa 1928

The mansion also featured a Chinese temple room which reconstructed a 5th-century Chinese temple and included a more-than-500-year-old mandarin bed which had once belonged to a Chinese princess. The Chinese temple room was said to have cost $87,000. In the mansion, Marshall built nautical-themed bar which featured portholes with a moving replica of the sea which mimicked rocking of a boat at sea. This space would inspire a bar which Marshall would later design for the Edgewater Beach Hotel. The mansion also featured a reconstructed room taken from a convent. The mansion also included a small cafe room with a table which bore the autographs of many of the prominent visitors to the mansion. The mansion also contained a studio/drawing room. This space featured a high ceiling and a stage. Underneath the stage was storage space for tables which could be rolled out in order to transform the architecture studio workspace into a banquet hall. Serving as a backdrop curtain to the stage was a tapestry which Louis XIV once presented to Madame de Pompadour. The home also housed an architectural studio and office for Marshall when he lived there, which was housed in its street-facing front side.

During the time in which Marshall owned the mansion, it also housed club quarters of the Sheridan Shores Yacht Club membership organization. The Sheridan Shores Yacht Club was housed in a space on the lower floor of the mansion. Marshall had allowed the club to be located in his mansion as a compromise with the village of Wilmette's government. The village government had previously been unwilling to rezone the property to permit him to house his commercial offices there. As a result, Marshall had been unable to get a building permit for the home. Marshall made an offer to members of the headquarter-less organization that he would let them house their headquarters in the basement of the studio if they could convince the village to issue a permit. Soon afterwards, the village was convinced to issue a permit allowing for the construction of a "clubhouse-studio", allowing Marshall to construct his mansion. The Yacht Club occupied several rooms on the lower floor. When Marshall sold the mansion to Nathan Goldblatt, the Sheridan Shores Club was evicted from their quarters.

== Sale to Nathan Goldblatt ==
Marshall was economically impacted by the downturn of the Great Depression and had to sell the mansion to Nathan Goldblatt (of Goldblatt's fortune) in 1936. Goldblatt paid Marshall $95,000 for the mansion. This price was despite the fact that the mansion's sale included the mansion's furnishings, which alone had been estimated to be worth several hundred thousand dollars at the time. After the change in ownership, the Sheridan Shores Club was evicted from their headquarters in the lower floor of the Marshall Mansion. In 1937, the Sheridan Shores Yacht Club constructed a new standalone clubhouse at Wilmette Harbor. After selling his mansion, Marshall initially moved to a residence in Winnetka, Illinois, but would ultimately live most of the remainder of his life at the Drake Hotel.

== Abandonment and demolition ==
In 1947, Nathan Goldblatt's widow, Frances, moved out of the mansion. The Goldblatt family offered up the mansion to the village for use as a community center. However, the village declined their offer. While there had been a push in November 1948 for the town to purchase it for this purpose, this was decided against by the village government, which saw problems with the fact that the mansion was located along a stretch of Sheridan Road that they felt lacked safe pedestrian crossing, thereby impeding access to it. Most of the mansion's furniture was sold in a week-long auction held in March 1948. The mansion received damage from looters in May 1949, impacting the house and furnishings which remained inside. Windows and doors were smashed open, which allowed for rain to damage expensive wood inlay floors. Additionally, expensive tapestries, drapes, chandeliers, and upholstery were noted as either missing or damaged. Many items that had been sold at auction had not yet been removed from the mansion by the purchasers at the time of the vandalism. Further vandalism included the littering of empty soft drink bottles and cigarette butts throughout the mansion. Police suspected that teenagers were responsible.

The Goldblatts decided to tear-down the mansion, which would relieve them from a massive property tax burden. A permit to demolish the structure was issued in August 1949, and the remaining furnishings of the residence (such as ornamental metalwork, imported tiling, and wood paneling) were sold. and the opulent mansion was ultimately demolished between 1949 and 1950. The structure was difficult to demolish, with the company undertaking the job likening it to "demolishing a fort". One of the complicating factors was the complexity of the structure's staggered levels, terraces, and floors. The only remnants of the mansion are its iron gates, which still stand along Sheridan Road. The roughly 4 acres (1.6 ha) of land on which the mansion stood was considered valuable and was purchased by the Baháʼís in 1951.
