= Edgewater Beach Hotel =

Building complex in Chicago, Illinois

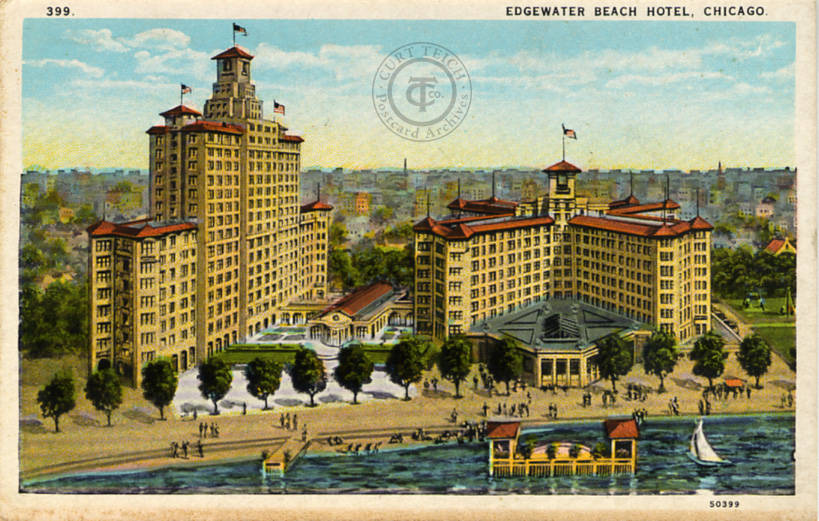
- Postcard of Edgewater Beach Hotel showing the 1916 (at right) and 1924 buildings with connecting concourse. This part of the resort was demolished by 1971.
- Interactive map of the Edgewater Beach Hotel area

General information
- Architectural style: Spanish Colonial Revival
- Location: 5301-5355 N Sheridan Road; Chicago, Illinois, United States
- Coordinates: 41°59′1″N 87°39′17″W
- Construction started: 1915
- Completed: 1924
- Opened: June 3, 1916
- Demolished: 1971
- Cost: US $9 million
- Client: John Tobin Connery and James Patrick Connery

Design and construction
- Architect: Marshall and Fox

- Edgewater Beach Apartments
- U.S. National Register of Historic Places
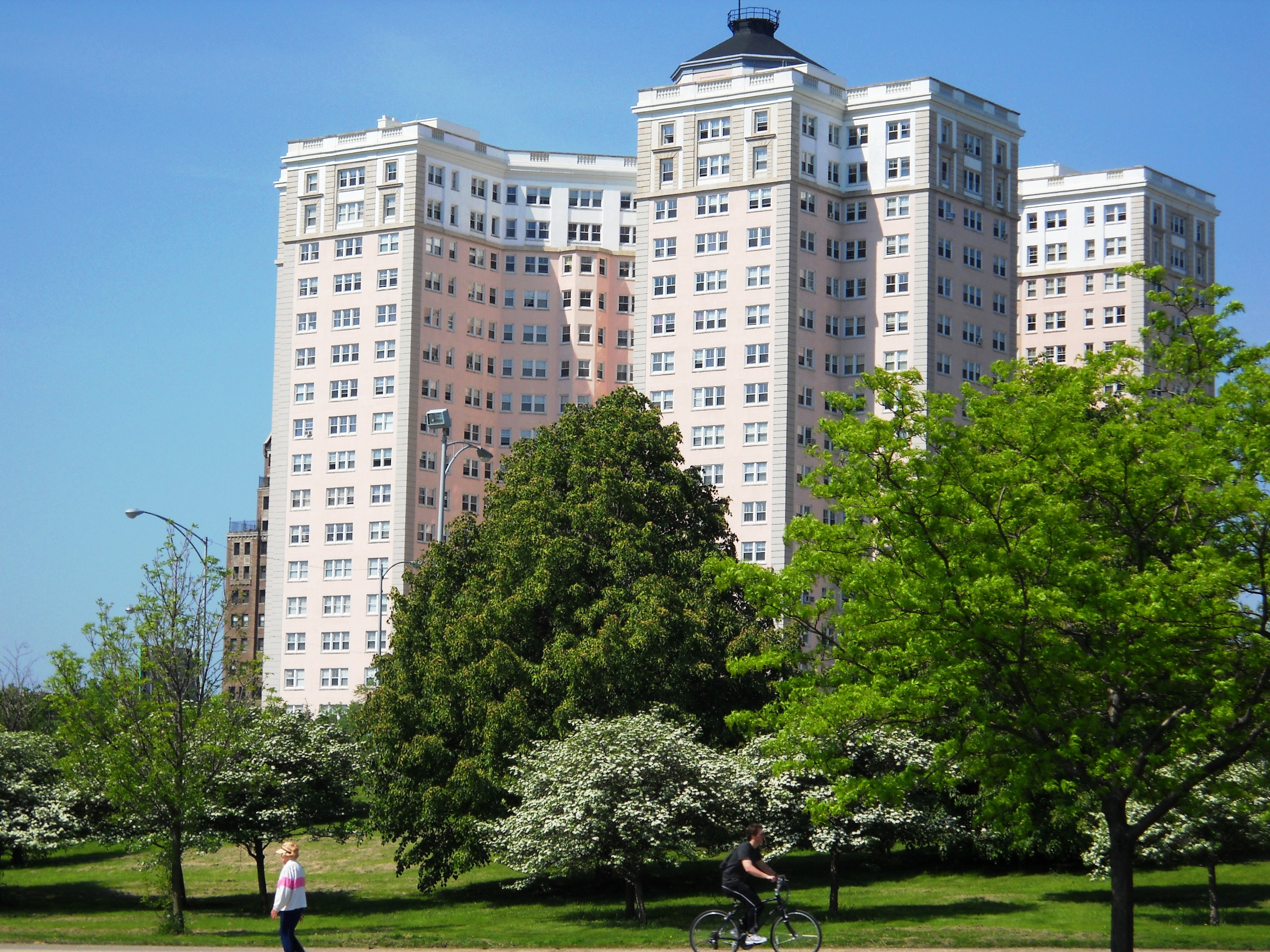
- The Edgewater Beach Apartments, built in 1927, sole portion of complex now standing

- Location within Chicago metropolitan area Location within Illinois Location within the United States
- Location: 5555 North Sheridan Road; Chicago, Illinois
- Coordinates: 41°59′1″N 87°39′17″W
- Built: 1928 (co-op apartments)
- Architect: Marshall and Fox
- Architectural style: Beaux-arts / Historism
- MPS: Bryn Mawr Avenue Historic District
- NRHP reference No.: 94000979
- Added to NRHP: August 16, 1994

The Edgewater Beach Hotel was a resort hotel complex on Lake Michigan in the far-north neighborhood community of Edgewater in Chicago, Illinois, designed by Benjamin H. Marshall and Charles E. Fox. The first multi-story hotel building was built in 1916, for its owners John Tobin Connery and James Patrick Connery, located between Sheridan Road and Lake Michigan at Berwyn Avenue in a Spanish Revival style. An adjacent south tower building was added in 1924, with a low connecting passageway-building to serve as reception and additional public rooms. The resort, which included beaches, pools, clubs, and gardens hosted famous movie and sports stars, and later Martin Luther King Jr. The hotel was also the setting for the celebrity stalking case and shooting that inspired the novel and movie The Natural. The hotel buildings closed in 1967, and were soon after demolished.

The Edgewater Beach Apartments to the north were completed as part of the hotel resort complex in 1928. The "sunset pink" apartments complemented the "sunrise yellow" hotel buildings in a similar architectural style. The apartments remain and have been listed on the National Register of Historic Places.

== Design ==
Designed by Chicago-based architects Marshall and Fox in September 1915, the complex comprised several buildings and recreation grounds. The Main Building, modeled in the shape of a croix fourchée ("forked cross"), initially had 400 rooms and opened on June 3, 1916. It quickly became a success, with a one-story addition to the northeast and southeast wings of the building added in 1919. In April 1923, construction began on a $3 million, 19 story, 600-room tower addition to the south of the Main Building. The Tower Building, which opened for occupancy on February 9, 1924, had a stepped design, tallest at its center, with lower sections to the east and west of the center. The addition, initially called the Annex, was connected to the Main Building by a large hall known as the Passaggio. High-end shops lined the ground floor of the Sheridan Road side, and a marble-tiled open air dance floor and bandshell, known as the Beach Walk, faced the Lake Michigan side.

The hotel had a 1,200-foot private beach and offered seaplane service to downtown Chicago. When both buildings were initially constructed, the hotel sat 20 feet (6.1 m) from Lake Michigan. The 1933 extension of Lake Shore Drive north to Foster Avenue resulted in the creation of a private bathing beach east of the hotel and north of Foster along the Lake Michigan shore.

== History ==
The hotel served many famous guests, including Marilyn Monroe, Frank Sinatra, Judy Garland, Charlie Chaplin, Bette Davis, Lena Horne, Tallulah Bankhead, Nat King Cole, and U.S. Presidents Franklin D. Roosevelt and Dwight D. Eisenhower. The hotel was known for hosting big bands such as those of Benny Goodman, Tommy Dorsey, Glenn Miller, Artie Shaw, Xavier Cugat, Dan Russo, Ted Fiorito, and Wayne King, which were also broadcast on the hotel's own radio station, a precursor to WGN, with the call letters WEBH. In January 1963, Martin Luther King Jr. spoke at the hotel at the Conference on Religion and Race.

For much if its history, the resort had an in house summer stock theater company, Edgewater Beach Playhouse, in which touring stars would often come perform for a short residency. In the winter months, the bands played in the Marine Dining Room and, in the summer months, outdoors on the Beach Walk. On the first floor of the hotel, guests walked on a wooden gangway into the Yacht Club for cocktails. In the early days women were not permitted to sit at the bar.

On June 14, 1949, Philadelphia Phillies first baseman Eddie Waitkus was shot and nearly killed by an obsessive fan at the hotel, 19-year-old Ruth Steinhagen; this later would be a large part of the inspiration behind Bernard Malamud's novel The Natural.

The 1951–54 extension of Lake Shore Drive from Foster Avenue to Hollywood Avenue reduced direct access to Lake Michigan, leading to a reduction in business. This roadway was built on landfill in the area that had been the private beach for the hotel. While new public beaches serving the Edgewater neighborhood were eventually created, they did not replace the hotel's own beach. After the hotel was cut off from the lake by the new drive, a swimming pool was added in 1953. In 1960, in order to compete with popular downtown hotels, the Edgewater Beach underwent a $900,000 renovation, which included the installation of air conditioning. Approximately 30% of rooms, including restaurants and public spaces of the hotel, were fitted with air conditioning. By 1961, that number rose to nearly 70%.

From January 14–17, 1963, the National Conference on Religion and Race was held at the resort. Martin Luther King Jr., assisted by Wyatt Tee Walker, was on the steering committee for the conference, which was called by the National Council of Churches, Synagogue Council of America, and the National Catholic Welfare Conference. King gave a major address at the conference, "A Challenge to Justice and Love", to commemorate the 100th anniversary of the Emancipation Proclamation. He called the conference, "the most significant and historic ever held for attacking racial injustice." A statement in support of civil rights from President John F. Kennedy was read and Abraham J. Heschel also spoke. The conference adopted An Appeal to the Conscience of the American People for a moral end to racism.

== Apartments ==
The Edgewater Beach Co-op Apartments, built in 1928, at the north end of the property, and shown in the photo at right, is the only part of the hotel complex to survive and is part of the Bryn Mawr Historic District. As he had before with many his other projects, such as the South Shore Country Club, the Blackstone Hotel, the Drake Hotel and Drake Tower, architect Benjamin H. Marshall designed the apartment building with accoutrements suited for the well-to-do. It was added to the National Register of Historic Places in 1994. The apartments stand at the north end of Lake Shore Drive, quite visible to the passing traffic, and unusual in Chicago for the "sunset pink" exterior. When both stood, the color coordinated with the "sunrise yellow" of the hotel.

The retail arcade in the current building houses a floral shop, two restaurants, a podiatrist, a physical therapist, an art gallery, a dry cleaner, an event planner, an accountant/tax planner, attorney, dentist and mental health counselor.

== Closure and demolition ==
The hotel closed abruptly on December 21, 1967, following bankruptcy proceedings. The hotel had stopped catering to the "carriage trade" and tried to gain convention business, which effort failed. The building was leased to Loyola University in the fall of 1968, for use as a dormitory to house 300 students. By January 31, 1969, the Loyola students residing at the Edgewater Beach relocated to new housing constructed on the University's campus. Demolition of the hotel complex began in the fall of 1969 and was completed by 1971.

Following the hotel's demolition, four high-rise apartment buildings of modern architecture (Edgewater Plaza (twin towers), 5415 EdgewaterBeach, and The Breakers at Edgewater Beach) replaced the Edgewater Beach Hotel and its olympic-size swimming pool and putting greens, leaving only the Edgewater Beach Apartments and its gardens as a vestige of the resort's elegance.

== Edgewater Gulf Hotel ==
The developers also built a sister hotel, the Edgewater Gulf Hotel, in Biloxi, Mississippi, which closed in 1970. Both projects were designed by the Chicago architectural firm of Marshall and Fox.

== Photo gallery ==
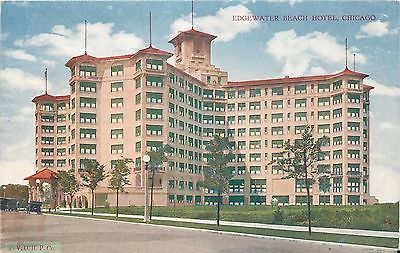
Original 1916 hotel

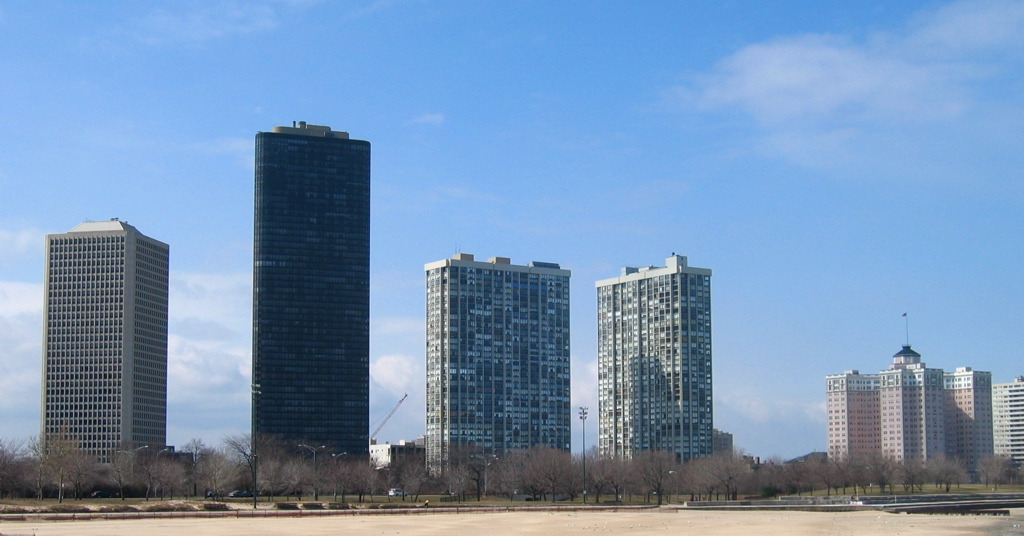
Site of the Edgewater Beach Hotel complex viewed from the southeast in 2006

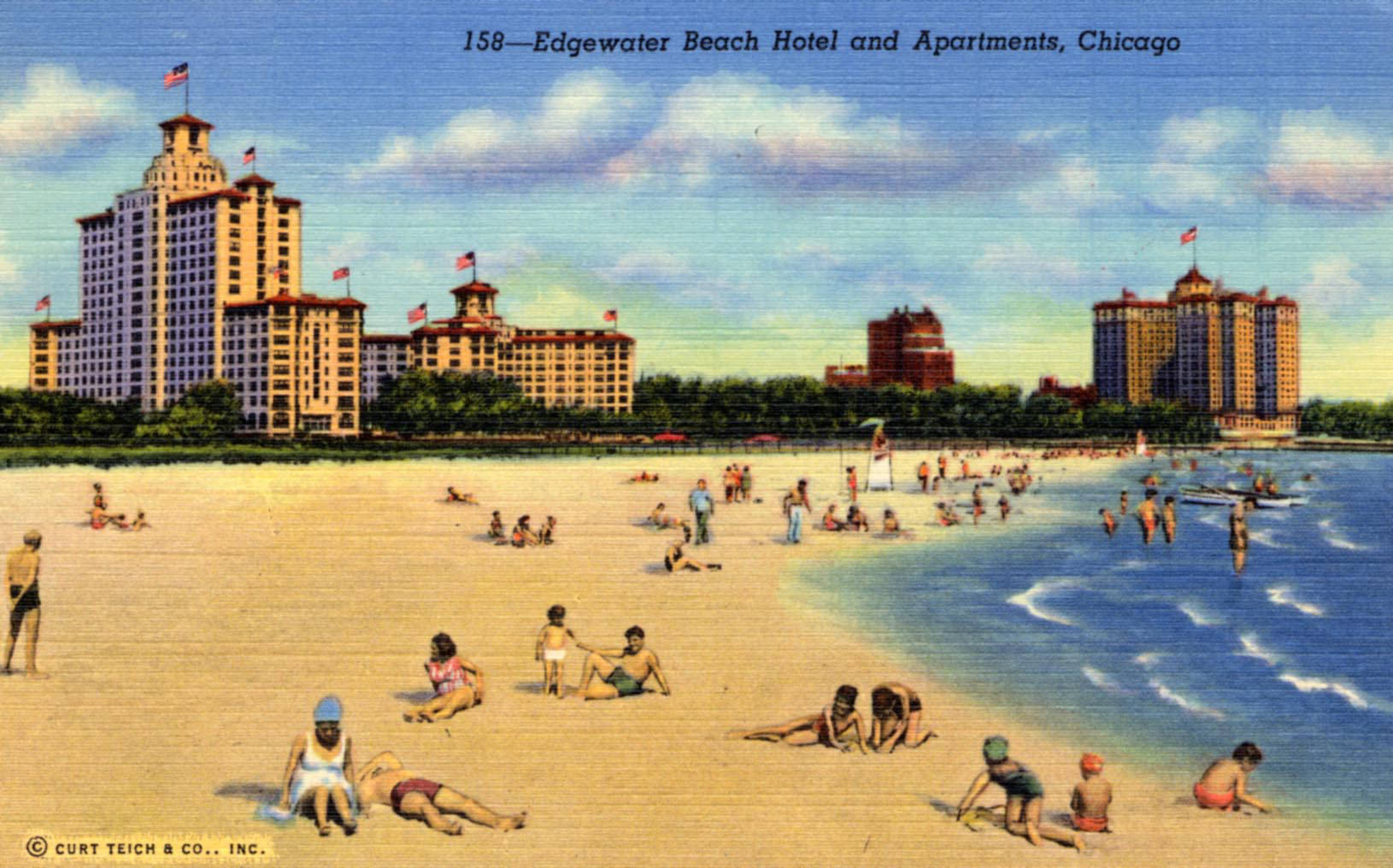
Edgewater Beach Hotel complex viewed from the southeast in 1941

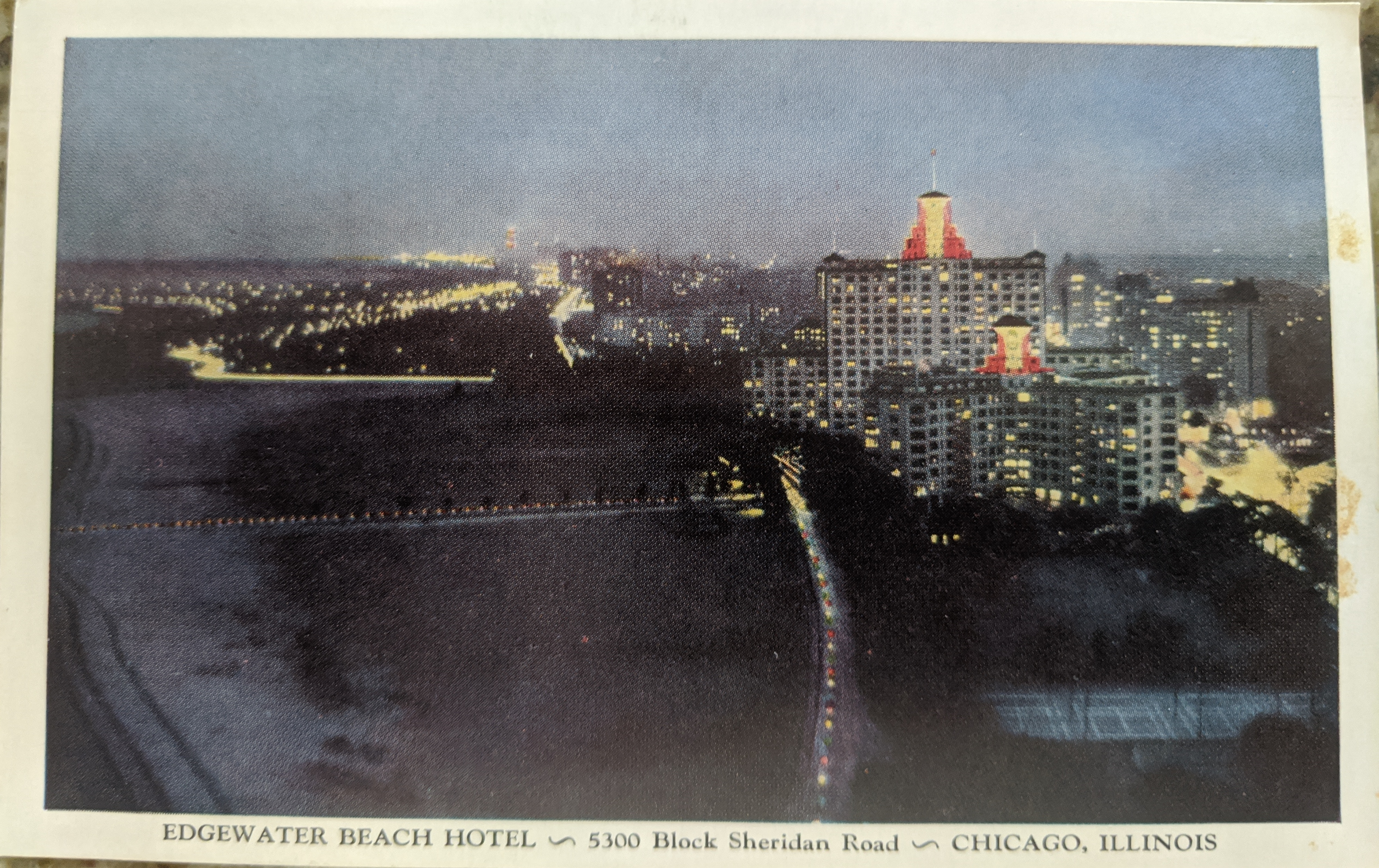
A postcard of the Edgewater Beach Hotel Chicago Water Front (c. 1948)

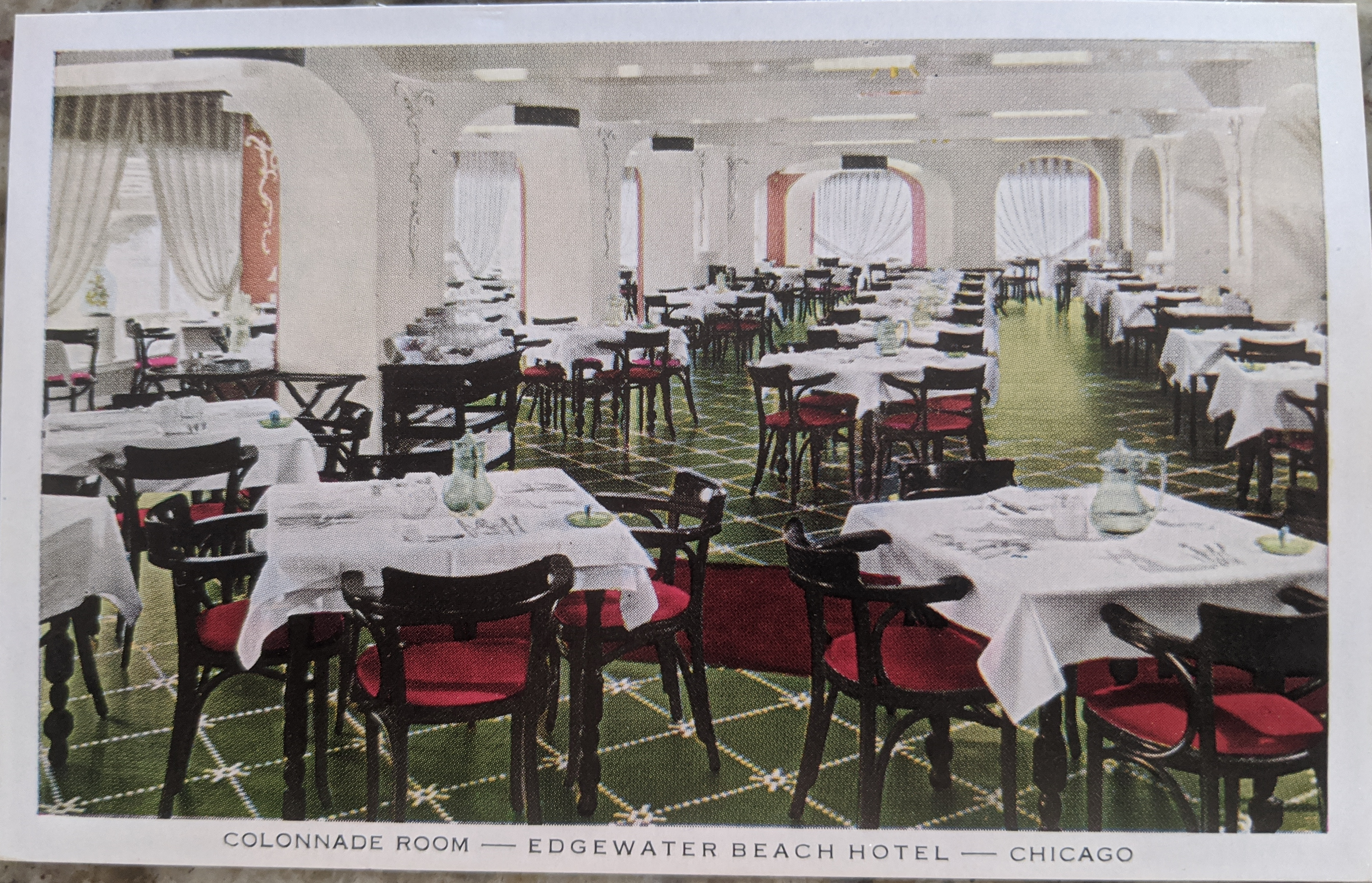
A Postcard of the Edgewater Beach Hotel Chicago Colonnade Room (c. 1948)

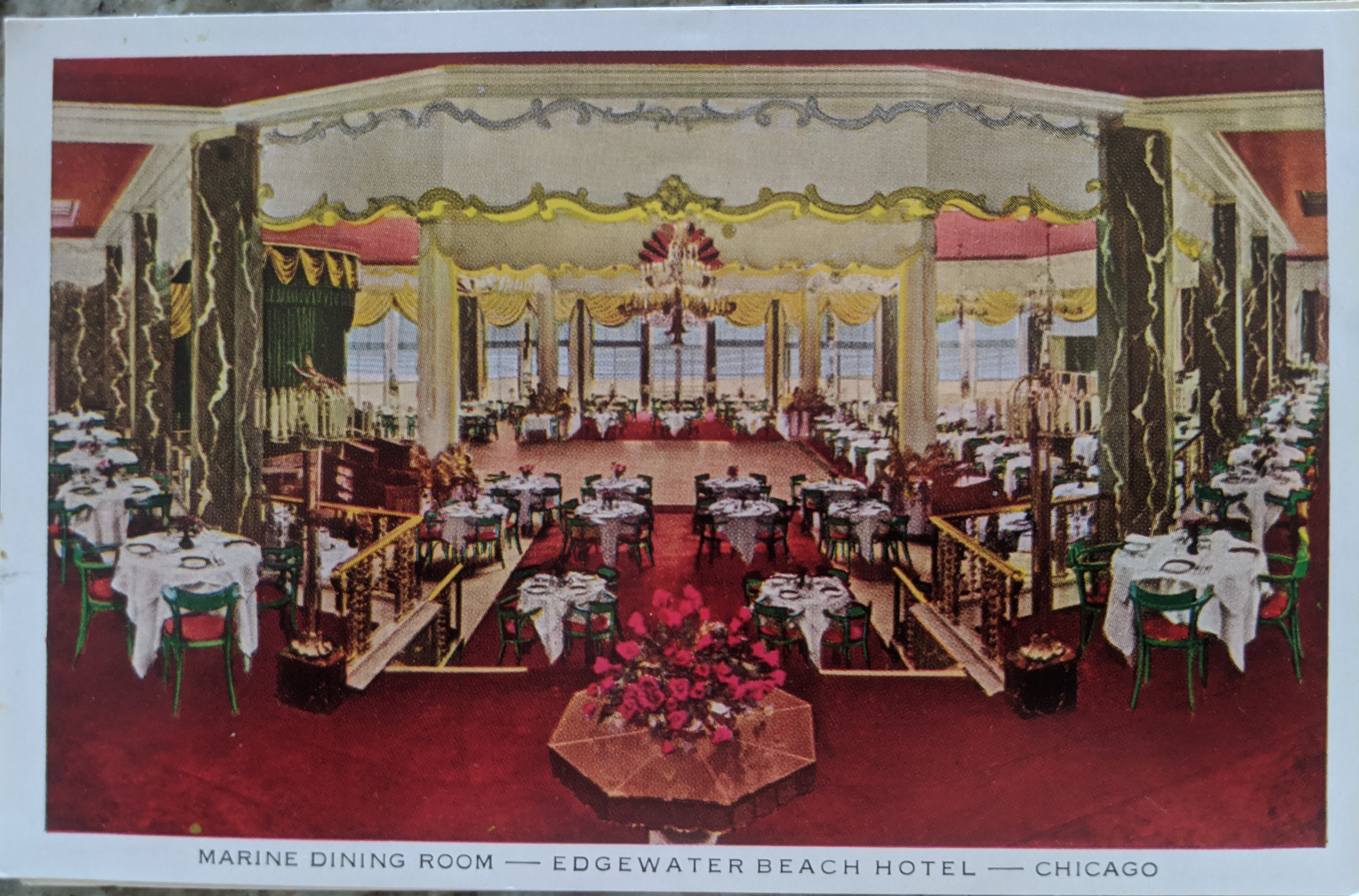
A postcard of the Edgewater Beach Hotel Chicago Marine Dining Room (c. 1948)

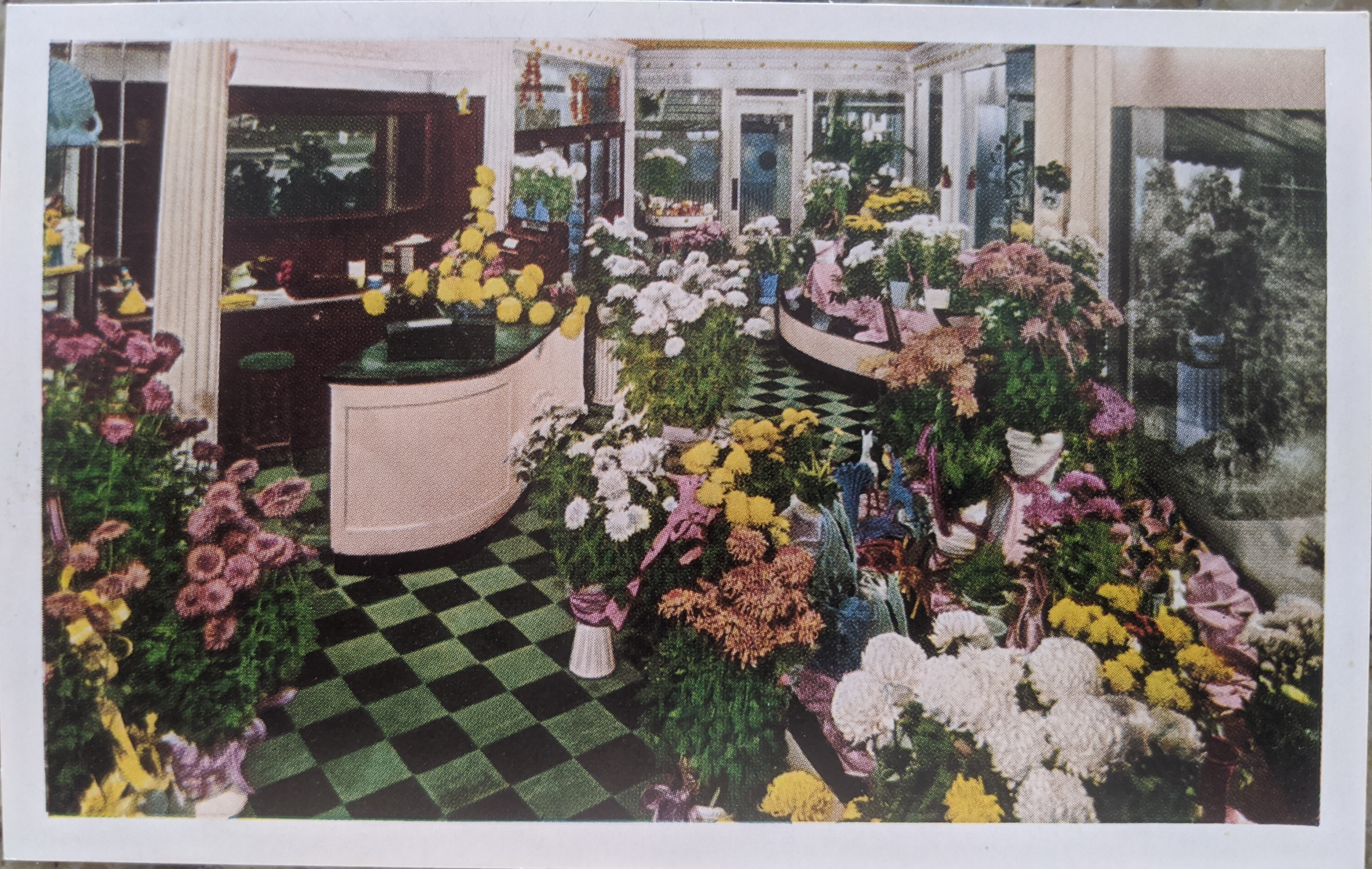
A postcard of an Edgewater Beach Hotel Chicago Front Desk Scene (c. 1948)

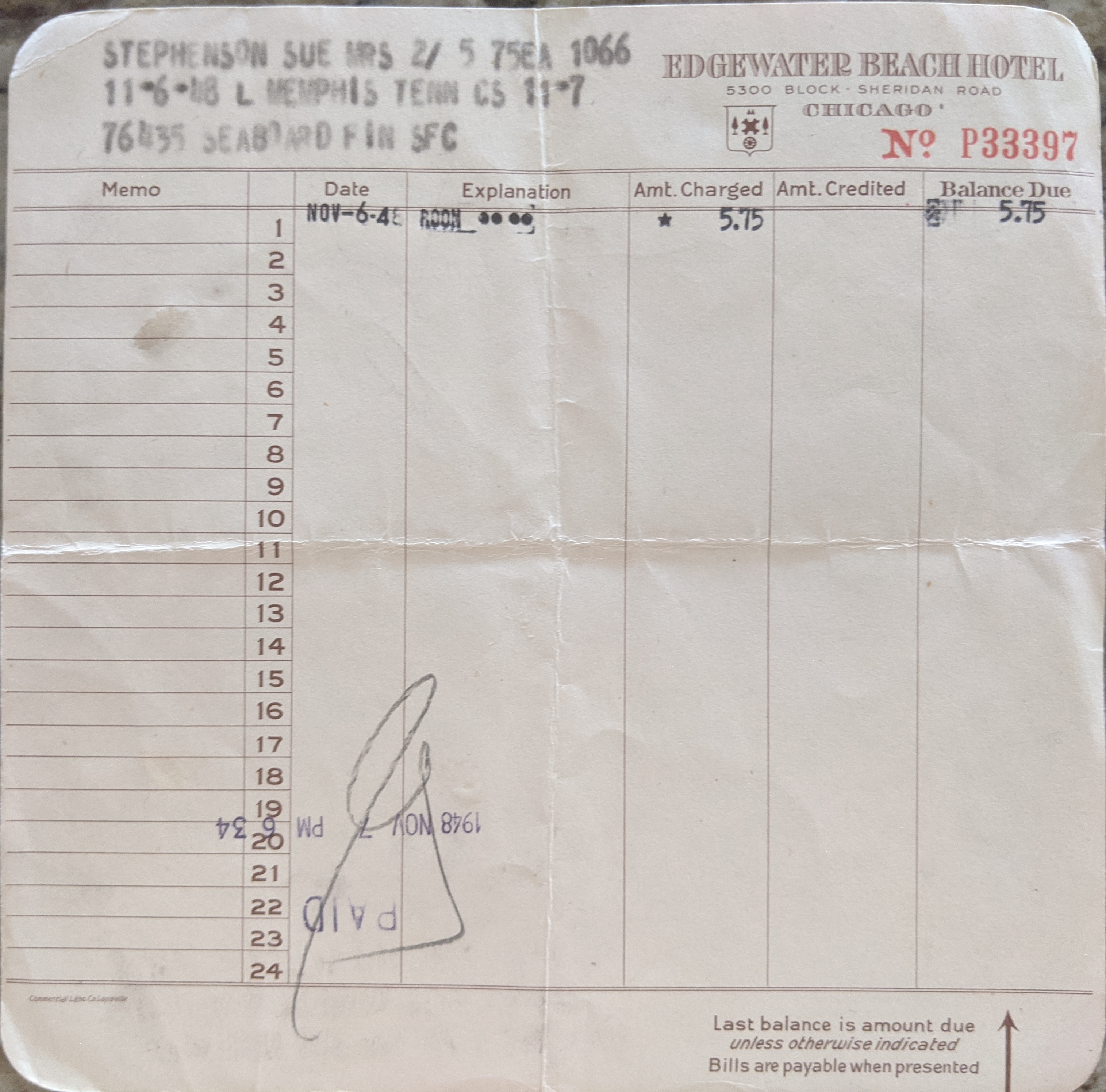
A room bill from the Edgewater Beach Hotel dated November 6, 1948.
