= Benjamin H. Marshall =

American architect based in Chicago (1874–1944)

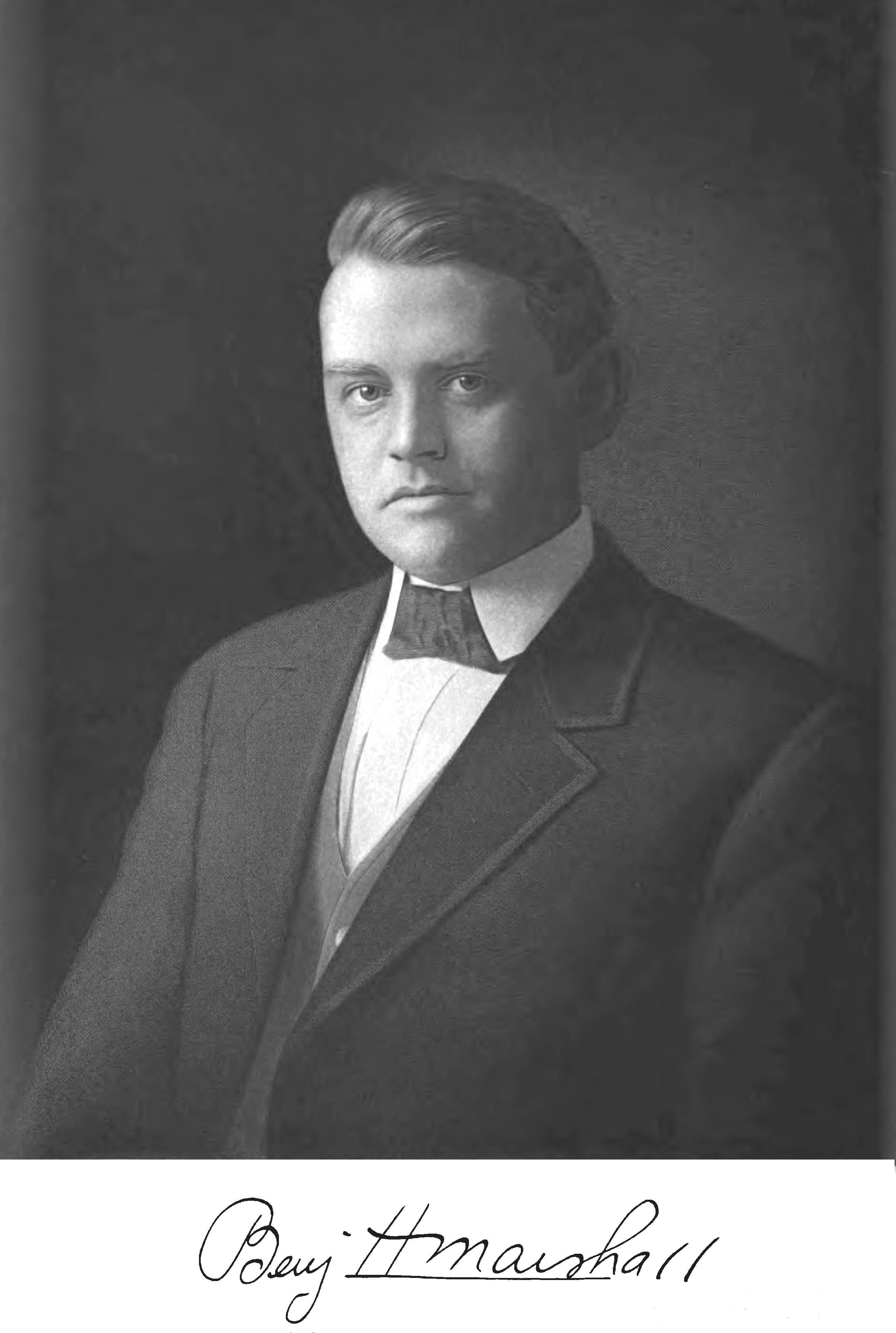
- Born: May 5, 1874; Chicago, Illinois, U.S.
- Died: June 19, 1944 (aged 70); Chicago, Illinois, U.S.
- Occupation: Architect
- Notable work: Drake Hotel, Blackstone Hotel, Edgewater Beach Hotel, South Shore Cultural Center
- Spouse: Elizabeth Walton (m. 1905)
- Children: 3

Benjamin Howard Marshall (May 5, 1874 – June 19, 1944) was an American architect based in Chicago, Illinois. He is known for his designs of luxury hotels, apartment buildings, and country estates. His firm, Marshall and Fox, was responsible for many of Chicago's landmark buildings, including the Drake Hotel and the Edgewater Beach Hotel, and was known for its pioneering work in poured concrete construction.

== Early life and education ==
Marshall was born in Chicago to Caleb H. and Celia F. Marshall. He attended the Harvard School for Boys in Kenwood, but did not pursue formal architectural education.

== Career ==
At the age of 19, he became an apprentice in the firm of Marble and Wilson and two years later, at the time of Marble's death, he was named a full-fledged partner. One of his earliest commissions was destroyed a month after its completion in an event remembered as one of Chicago's worst disasters, the Iroquois Theater Fire of 1903.

In 1905, Marshall co-founded the firm Marshall and Fox with Charles E. Fox, a graduate of MIT. Their firm specialized in designing opulent hotels and apartment buildings in classical revival styles.

His work was also part of the architecture event in the art competition at the 1928 Summer Olympics.

== Major works ==
Some of Marshall's most important buildings include:

- The Blackstone Hotel (1908–1910) – A Beaux-Arts hotel located on South Michigan Avenue, known for hosting numerous U.S. presidents.
- Edgewater Beach Hotel and Edgewater Beach Apartments (1916–1928) – A Spanish Colonial Revival resort complex. The hotel was demolished in 1971, but the adjacent apartments remain.
- South Shore Cultural Center (originally South Shore Country Club) – A Mediterranean Revival club built around 1919.
- Mayslake Peabody Estate, Oak Brook, Illinois (1919–1921) – A Tudor Revival mansion built for coal magnate Francis Stuyvesant Peabody.
- Marshall/Goldblatt Mansion, Wilmette, Illinois (1922–1924) – A flamboyant pink stucco residence that doubled as Marshall's studio and social hub. It was demolished around 1950.
- Cuneo Mansion, Vernon Hills, Illinois (1914) – A lavish estate for Samuel Insull, later the residence of the Cuneo family.
- Hillside Farm, Northport, Maine (1914) – A country estate for Ira M. Cobe and the largest home in the state of Maine.

== Style and influence ==
Marshall's work incorporated Beaux-Arts and revivalist styles with modern amenities. He favored French-inspired designs, and some of his apartment buildings featured floorplans labeled in French. His projects often included entire floors dedicated to a single residence, with separate rooms for staff.

Following the 1903 Iroquois Theatre fire—in which flawed design contributed to hundreds of deaths—Marshall shifted toward safer poured concrete construction.

== Personal life ==
Marshall married Elizabeth Walton in 1905 and had three children.

== Later years and death ==
Marshall continued to design buildings and interiors after his partner Charles Fox's death in 1926. He lived at the Drake Hotel, one of his firm's own commissions, until his death in 1944. Financial hardship during the Great Depression curtailed his later career.

== Legacy ==
In 2002, the Benjamin Marshall Society was founded to preserve his legacy. In 2024, Chicago declared May 5 “Benjamin Marshall Day” to celebrate his 150th birthday. The 2015 book Benjamin H. Marshall: Chicago Architect by John Zukowsky and Jean Guarino further advanced his scholarly recognition.

== See also ==
- Marshall and Fox
- Edgewater Beach Hotel
- Mayslake Peabody Estate
- Cobe Estate
- List of Chicago Landmarks
