= Cobe Estate =

Historic house in Maine, United States

- U.S. National Register of Historic Places
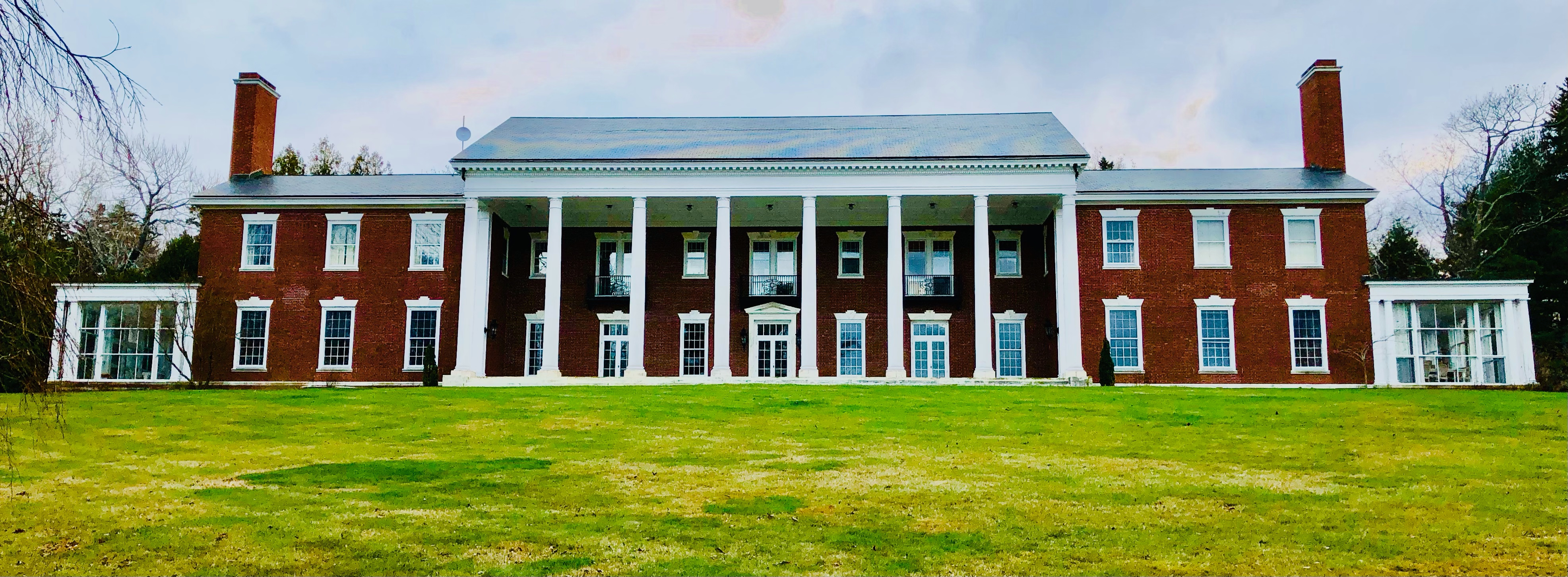
- Winter at Cobe Estate, in Northport, Maine

- Location within Maine Location within the United States
- Nearest city: Northport, Maine
- Coordinates: 44°22′27″N 68°58′7″W
- Area: 52 acres (21 ha)
- Built: 1912
- Architect: Marshall & Fox
- Architectural style: Colonial Revival
- Restored by: Brady Brim-DeForest
- Website: www.oakhallestate.org
- NRHP reference No.: 83003684
- Added to NRHP: October 20, 1983

The Cobe Estate, also known as Hillside Farm, Cariad or Oak Hall, is a historic summer mansion house on Bluff Road in Northport, Maine. Overlooking Penobscot Bay, this 1910s mansion is one of the largest Colonial Revival houses in the state. It was built in 1912-14 for Chicago lawyer Ira M. Cobe, and was listed on the National Register of Historic Places in 1983.

== Description and history ==
The Cobe Estate is in northern Northport, on the west side of Bluff Road just south of the Bayside neighborhood and the Northport Golf Club. The house is a large 2-1/2 story structure, whose main section and side wings are finished in brick. Its long facades face the northeast and southwest, and are sheltered by two-story colonnades of columns, round on one side and square on the other. The southwest colonnade is topped by a Colonial Revival railing, protecting a balcony space accessible from the attic level. Two-story wings extends the house's length, with one end also sporting sunporches.

The interior of the house is lavishly appointed, with marble and carved woodwork widely used. The central hall has flanking wooden staircases rising to a common landing. Walls feature both wooden and plaster paneling, with the music room particularly decorated with designs incorporating musical instruments. All of the rooms are Colonial Revival in style except for the library, which has Gothic features.

The house was designed by Benjamin H. Marshall of Marshall & Fox, a leading Chicago architectural firm, and was built in 1912-14 for Ira M. Cobe, a Chicago lawyer and investment banker. Cobe's wife Anne was from Belfast, Maine, and the house was built in Northport so that she could be nearer her family in the summertime.

The estate grounds were designed by Warren H. Manning.

The house also appeared in the soap opera Passions as the exterior of the Crane Mansion.

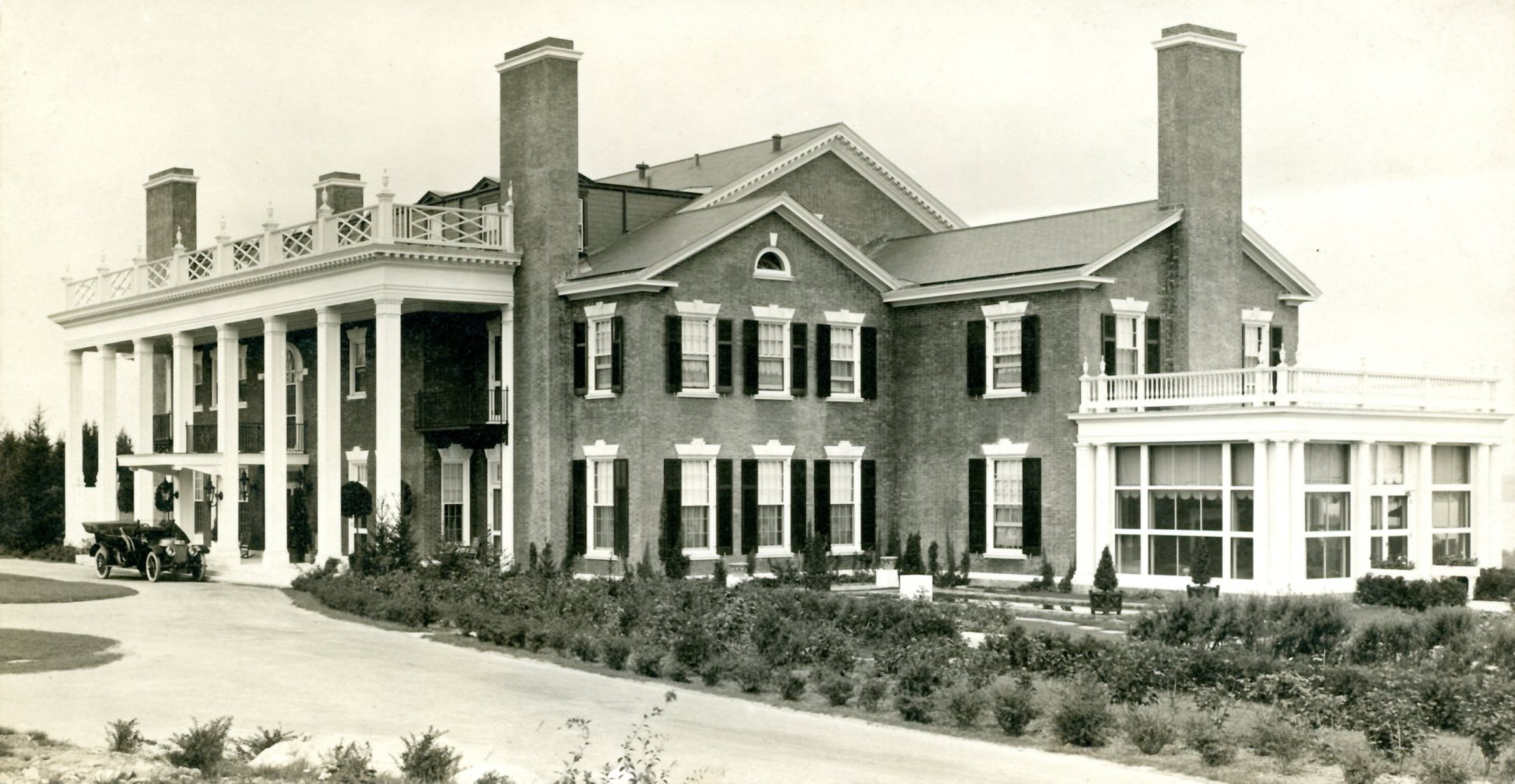
Cobe Residence, Northport, Maine in the 1920s.

== See also ==
- National Register of Historic Places listings in Waldo County, Maine
- List of Gilded Age mansions in Maine
