= Northport, Maine =

Town in Maine, United States

- Town
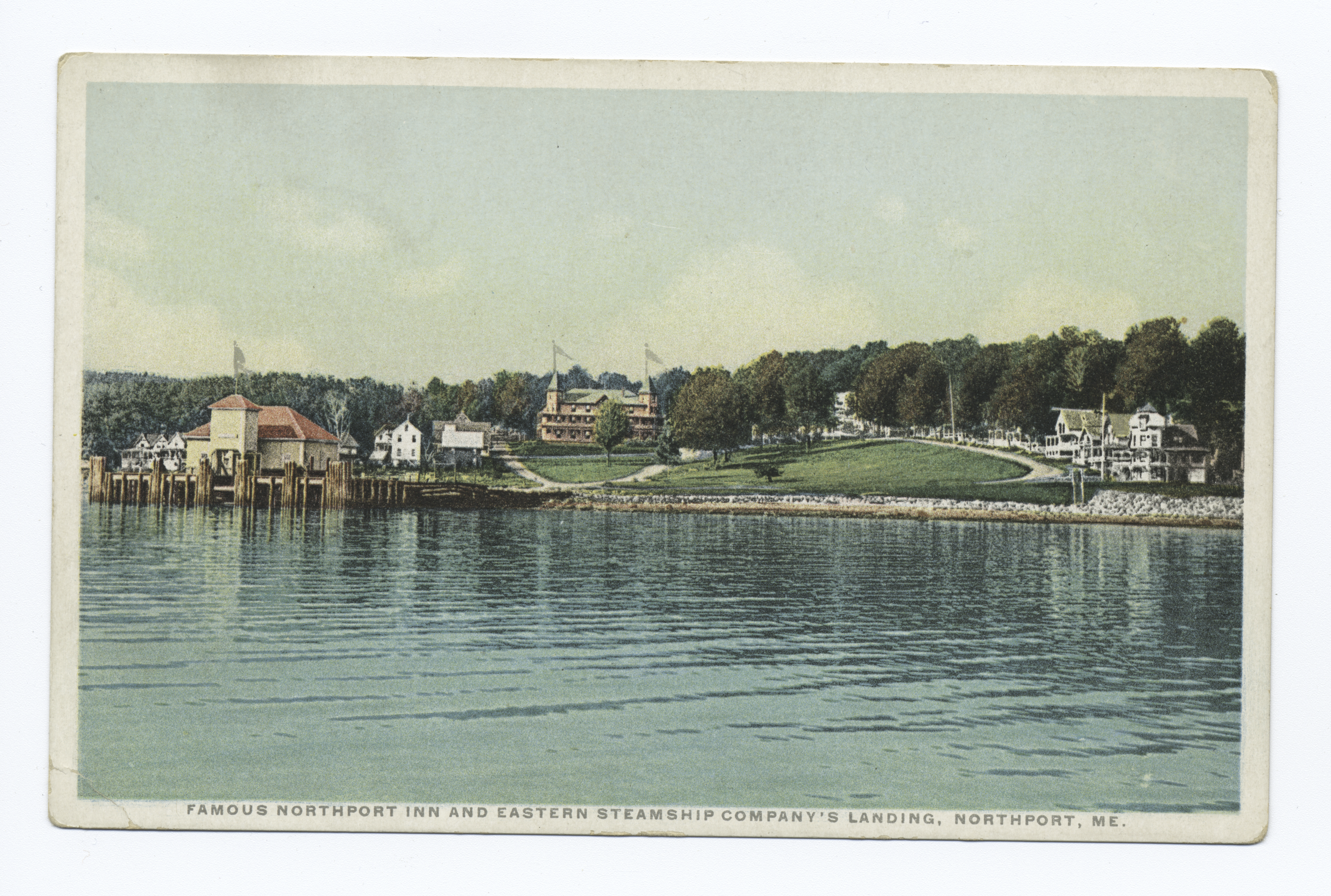
- Postcard, early 20th century

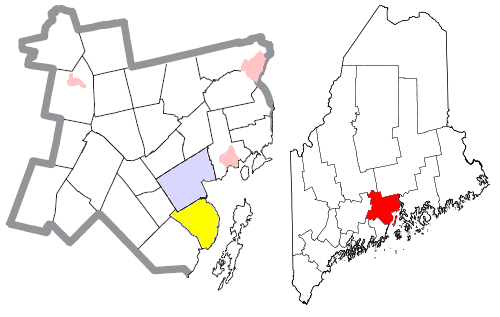
- Location of Northport (in yellow) in Waldo County and the state of Maine
- Coordinates: 44°22′12″N 69°00′40″W
- Country: United States
- State: Maine
- County: Waldo
- Established: 1796 (230 years ago)

Area
  - Total: 34.99 sq mi (90.62 km^{2})
  - Land: 23.78 sq mi (61.59 km^{2})
  - Water: 11.21 sq mi (29.03 km^{2})
- Elevation: 338 ft (103 m)

Population (2020)
  - Total: 1,550
  - Density: 65/sq mi (25.2/km^{2})
- Time zone: UTC-5 (Eastern (EST))
  - Summer (DST): UTC-4 (EDT)
- ZIP code: 04849
- Area code: 207
- FIPS code: 23-52845
- GNIS feature ID: 582636
- Website: northportmaine.org

Northport is a town on Penobscot Bay in Waldo County, Maine, United States. The population was 1,550 at the 2020 census. The coastal Bayside residential area is home to over one hundred Victorian seaside cottages, a marina, and the Cobe Estate.

== Geography ==
According to the United States Census Bureau, the town has a total area of 34.99 square miles (90.62 km^{2}), of which 23.78 square miles (61.59 km^{2}) is land and 11.21 square miles (29.03 km^{2}) is water. Principal bodies of water include: Pitcher Pond (370 acres), Knight Pond (95 acres) and Belfast Reservoir #1 (37 acres).

Northport is served by U.S. Route 1 and Maine State Route 52. The town is bordered by Belfast on the north, Belmont on the west and Lincolnville on the south and Penobscot Bay on the east.

== Demographics ==
Historical population
Census	Pop.	Note	%±
1800	482		—
1810	780		61.8%
1820	939		20.4%
1830	1,083		15.3%
1840	1,207		11.4%
1850	1,260		4.4%
1860	1,178		−6.5%
1870	902		−23.4%
1880	872		−3.3%
1890	691		−20.8%
1900	545		−21.1%
1910	518		−5.0%
1920	466		−10.0%
1930	413		−11.4%
1940	485		17.4%
1950	574		18.4%
1960	658		14.6%
1970	755		14.7%
1980	958		26.9%
1990	1,201		25.4%
2000	1,331		10.8%
2010	1,520		14.2%
2020	1,550		2.0%
U.S. Decennial Census

=== 2010 census ===
As of the census of 2010, there were 1,520 people, 681 households, and 429 families living in the town. The population density was 63.9 inhabitants per square mile (24.7/km^{2}). There were 1,162 housing units at an average density of 48.9 per square mile (18.9/km^{2}). The racial makeup of the town was 98.1% White, 0.3% African American, 0.1% Native American, 0.3% Asian, 0.1% from other races, and 1.1% from two or more races. Hispanic or Latino of any race were 0.7% of the population.

There were 681 households, of which 25.1% had children under the age of 18 living with them, 50.7% were married couples living together, 7.6% had a female householder with no husband present, 4.7% had a male householder with no wife present, and 37.0% were non-families. 29.5% of all households were made up of individuals, and 13.3% had someone living alone who was 65 years of age or older. The average household size was 2.23 and the average family size was 2.74.

The median age in the town was 47.8 years. 19.6% of residents were under the age of 18; 5.7% were between the ages of 18 and 24; 20.4% were from 25 to 44; 34.3% were from 45 to 64; and 20.2% were 65 years of age or older. The gender makeup of the town was 48.7% male and 51.3% female.

=== 2000 census ===
As of the census of 2000, there were 1,331 people, 566 households, and 369 families living in the town. The population density was 56.2 inhabitants per square mile (21.7/km^{2}). There were 943 housing units at an average density of 39.9 per square mile (15.4/km^{2}). The racial makeup of the town was 98.05% White, 0.08% African American, 0.15% Native American, 0.60% Asian, 0.08% from other races, and 1.05% from two or more races. Hispanic or Latino of any race were 0.45% of the population.

There were 566 households, out of which 26.0% had children under the age of 18 living with them, 54.1% were married couples living together, 7.1% had a female householder with no husband present, and 34.8% were non-families. 27.4% of all households were made up of individuals, and 10.2% had someone living alone who was 65 years of age or older. The average household size was 2.35 and the average family size was 2.83.

In the town, the population was spread out, with 21.9% under the age of 18, 4.7% from 18 to 24, 26.7% from 25 to 44, 31.5% from 45 to 64, and 15.2% who were 65 years of age or older. The median age was 43 years. For every 100 females, there were 94.9 males. For every 100 females age 18 and over, there were 91.7 males.

The median income for a household in the town was $39,435, and the median income for a family was $45,000. Males had a median income of $31,193 versus $26,875 for females. The per capita income for the town was $21,438. About 6.0% of families and 11.5% of the population were below the poverty line, including 17.0% of those under age 18 and 6.9% of those age 65 or over.

== Bayside ==
Bayside is a coastal residential area of Northport that is a self-governing, incorporated village. The Bayside Historic District contains over one hundred Victorian seaside cottages, a marina and the Cobe Estate.

The village is laid out on narrow roads branching off of two main streets that pass through. From the north, Bayside Road exits U.S. Route 1 before forking just beyond Edna Drinkwater Elementary School: to the north, closer to the coast, is Shore Road, while a few yards inland is Bluff Road. The two roads merge as Bluff Road before rejoining Route 1 at the southern end of the village, near Saturday Cove. Main Street runs north-to-south between the marina and Bluff Road.

At the village's marina, a row of Victorian houses reminiscent of San Francisco's Painted ladies lines Park Row, which bounds Ruggles Park on its western side. The Northport Inn formerly stood at the top of Ruggles Park. It burned down in 1919.

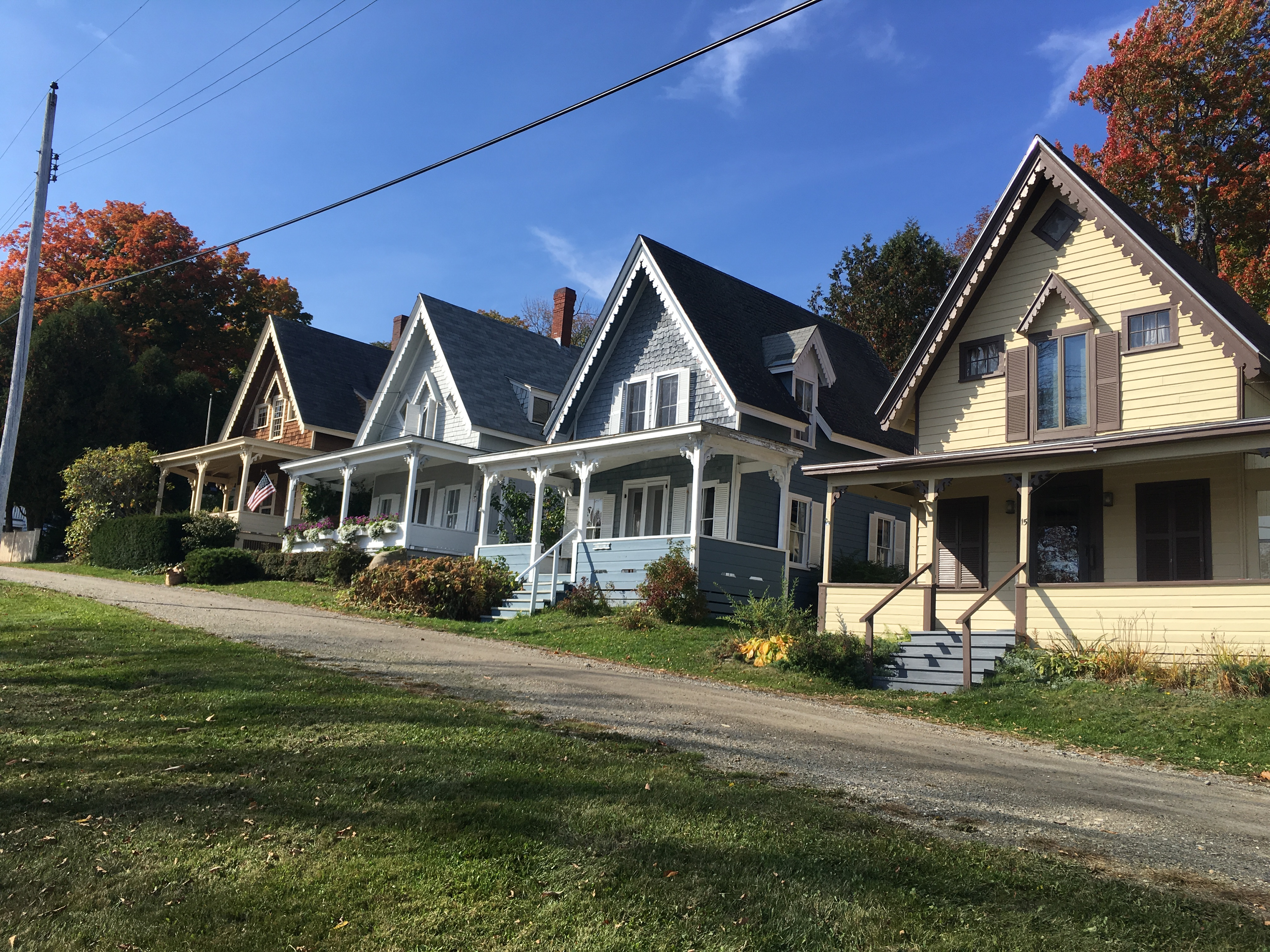
Four of the eleven Victorian cottages lining Park Row

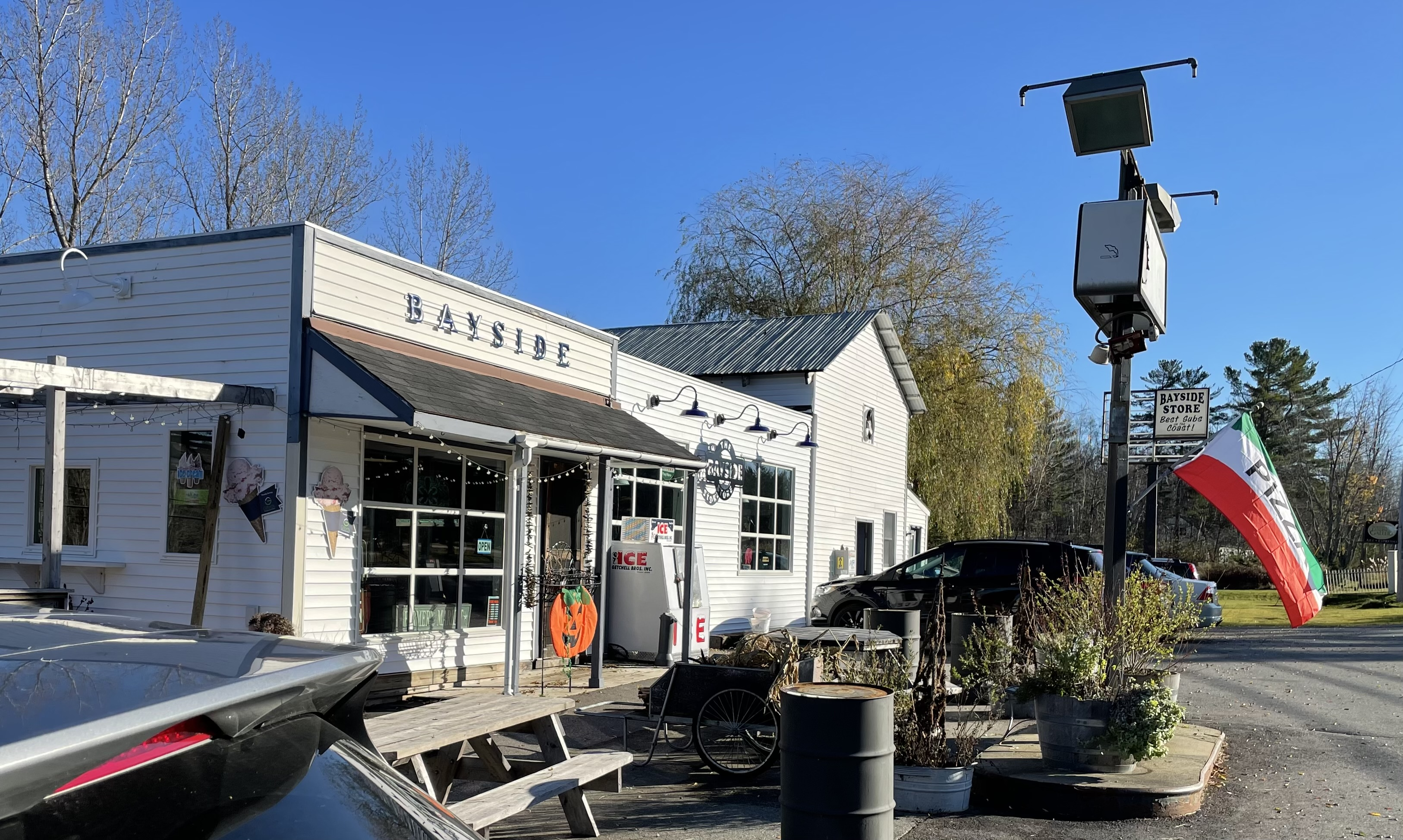
Bayside Store on Route 1
