= Bernard Malamud bibliography =

List of written works by Bernard Malamud

This is a bibliography of works by Bernard Malamud.

== Novels ==
Title	Year	Notes	Ref
The Natural	1952		
The Assistant	1957		
A New Life	1961		
The Fixer	1966	received the 1967 National Book Award and 1967 Pulitzer Prize for Fiction	
Pictures of Fidelman: An Exhibition	1969		
The Tenants	1971		
Dubin's Lives	1979		
God's Grace	1982		
The People		Unfinished; appears in The People and Uncollected Stories (1989)	

== Collections ==
Title	Publisher	Notes
The Magic Barrel	Farrar, Straus and Giroux (1958)	received 1959 National Book Award
Idiots First	Farrar, Straus and Giroux (1963)	
A Malamud Reader	Farrar, Straus and Giroux (1967)	
Pictures of Fidelman: An Exhibition	Farrar, Straus and Giroux (1969)	classified as a novel of linked stories
Rembrandt's Hat	Farrar, Straus and Giroux (1973)	
Two Fables	Banyan Press (1978)	Limited edition publication by Bennington College
The Stories of Bernard Malamud	Farrar, Straus and Giroux (1983)	
The People and Uncollected Stories	Farrar, Straus and Giroux (1989)	
The Complete Stories	Farrar, Straus and Giroux (1997)	
Novels and Stories of the 1940s & 50s	Library of America (2014)	Includes The Natural, The Assistant, and 25 stories
Novels and Stories of the 1960s	Library of America (2014)	Includes A New Life, The Fixer, Pictures of Fidelman: An Exhibition, and 10 stories
Novels and Stories of the 1970s & 80s	Library of America (2023)	Includes The Tenants, Dubin’s Lives, God’s Grace, and stories

== Short stories ==
Title	Original publication / Date Written	Collected in:
Armistice	Written 1940	The People and Uncollected Stories (1989); The Complete Stories (1997)
Spring Rain	Written 1942	The People and Uncollected Stories (1989); The Complete Stories (1997)
The Grocery Store	Written 1943	The People and Uncollected Stories (1989); The Complete Stories (1997)
Benefit Performance	Threshold, February 1943.	The People and Uncollected Stories (1989); The Complete Stories (1997)
The Place Is Different Now	American Prefaces, Spring 1943	The People and Uncollected Stories (1989); The Complete Stories (1997)
Steady Customer	New Threshold, August 1943	The Complete Stories (1997)
The Literary Life of Laban Goldman	Assembly, November 1943	The People and Uncollected Stories (1989); The Complete Stories (1997)
The Cost of Living	Harper's Bazaar, March 1950	Idiots First (1963); The Stories of Bernard Malamud (1983); The Complete Stories (1997)
The Prison	Commentary, September 1950	The Magic Barrel (1958); The Complete Stories (1997)
The First Seven Years	Partisan Review, September–October 1950	The Magic Barrel (1958); A Malamud Reader (1967); The Stories of Bernard Malamud (1983); The Complete Stories (1997)
The Death of Me	World Review, April 1951	Idiots First (1963); The Stories of Bernard Malamud (1983); The Complete Stories (1997)
The Bill	Commentary, April 1951	The Magic Barrel (1958); The Stories of Bernard Malamud (1983); The Complete Stories (1997)
The Loan	Commentary, July 1952	The Magic Barrel (1958); The Stories of Bernard Malamud (1983); The Complete Stories (1997)
A Confession of Murder	Written 1952	The People and Uncollected Stories (1989); The Complete Stories (1997)
Riding Pants	Written 1953	The People and Uncollected Stories (1989); The Complete Stories (1997)
The Girl of My Dreams	American Mercury, January 1953	The Magic Barrel (1958); The Complete Stories (1997)
The Magic Barrel	Partisan Review, November 1954	The Magic Barrel (1958); A Malamud Reader (1967); The Stories of Bernard Malamud (1983); The Complete Stories (1997)
The Mourners	Discovery, January 1955	The Magic Barrel (1958); A Malamud Reader (1967); The Stories of Bernard Malamud (1983); The Complete Stories (1997)
Angel Levine	Commentary, December 1955	The Magic Barrel (1958); The Stories of Bernard Malamud (1983); The Complete Stories (1997)
A Summer's Reading	The New Yorker, September 1956	The Magic Barrel (1958); The Complete Stories (1997)
Take Pity	America, September 1956	The Magic Barrel (1958); A Malamud Reader (1967); The Stories of Bernard Malamud (1983); The Complete Stories (1997)
The Elevator	Paris Review, Fall 1989	The People and Uncollected Stories (1989); The Complete Stories (1997)
An Apology	Commentary, November 1957	The People and Uncollected Stories (1989); The Complete Stories (1997)
The Last Mohican	Partisan Review, Spring 1958	The Magic Barrel (1958); A Malamud Reader (1967); Pictures of Fidelman: An Exhibition (1969); The Stories of Bernard Malamud (1983); The Complete Stories (1997)
The Lady of the Lake	-	The Magic Barrel (1958); The Complete Stories (1997)
Behold the Key	Commentary, May 1958	The Magic Barrel (1958); The Complete Stories (1997)
The Maid's Shoes	Partisan Review, Winter 1959	Idiots First (1963); A Malamud Reader (1967); The Stories of Bernard Malamud (1983); The Complete Stories (1997)
Idiots First	Commentary, December 1961	Idiots First (1963); A Malamud Reader (1967); The Stories of Bernard Malamud (1983); The Complete Stories (1997)
Still Life	Partisan Review, Winter 1962	Idiots First (1963); Pictures of Fidelman: An Exhibition (1969); The Complete Stories (1997)
Suppose a Wedding	New Statesman, February 1963	Idiots First (1963); The Complete Stories (1997)
Life Is Better Than Death	Esquire, May 1963	Idiots First (1963); The Stories of Bernard Malamud (1983); The Complete Stories (1997)
The Jewbird	The Reporter, April 1963	Idiots First (1963); A Malamud Reader (1967); Two Fables (1978); The Stories of Bernard Malamud (1983); The Complete Stories (1997)
Black Is My Favorite Color	The Reporter, July 1963	Idiots First (1963); A Malamud Reader (1967); The Stories of Bernard Malamud (1983); The Complete Stories (1997)
Naked Nude	Playboy, August 1963	Idiots First (1963); Pictures of Fidelman: An Exhibition (1969); The Complete Stories (1997)
The German Refugee	Saturday Evening Post, September 1963	Idiots First (1963); A Malamud Reader (1967); The Stories of Bernard Malamud (1983); The Complete Stories (1997)
A Choice of Profession	Commentary, September 1963	Idiots First (1963); The Complete Stories (1997)
A Pimp's Revenge	Playboy, September 1968	Pictures of Fidelman: An Exhibition (1969); The Complete Stories (1997)
Man in the Drawer	The Atlantic, April 1968	Rembrandt's Hat (1973); The Stories of Bernard Malamud (1983); The Complete Stories (1997)
My Son the Murderer	Esquire, November 1968	Rembrandt's Hat (1973); The Stories of Bernard Malamud (1983); The Complete Stories (1997)
Pictures of the Artist	The Atlantic, December 1968	Pictures of Fidelman: An Exhibition (1969); The Complete Stories (1997)
An Exorcism	Harper's, December 1968	The People and Uncollected Stories (1989); The Complete Stories (1997)
Glass Blower of Venice	-	Pictures of Fidelman: An Exhibition (1969); The Complete Stories (1997)
God's Wrath	The Atlantic, February 1972	The Stories of Bernard Malamud (1983); The Complete Stories (1997)
Talking Horse	The Atlantic, August 1972	Rembrandt's Hat (1973); Two Fables (1978); The Stories of Bernard Malamud (1983); The Complete Stories (1997)
The Letter	Esquire, August 1972	Rembrandt's Hat (1973); The Stories of Bernard Malamud (1983); The Complete Stories (1997)
The Silver Crown	Playboy, December 1972	Rembrandt's Hat (1973); The Stories of Bernard Malamud (1983); The Complete Stories (1997)
Notes from a Lady at a Dinner Party	Harper's, February 1973	Rembrandt's Hat (1973); The Complete Stories (1997)
In Retirement	The Atlantic, March 1973	Rembrandt's Hat (1973); The Stories of Bernard Malamud (1983); The Complete Stories (1997)
Rembrandt's Hat	The New Yorker, March 1973	Rembrandt's Hat (1973); The Stories of Bernard Malamud (1983); The Complete Stories (1997)
A Wig	The Atlantic, January 1980	The People and Uncollected Stories (1989); The Complete Stories (1997)
The Model	The Atlantic, August 1983	The Stories of Bernard Malamud (1983); The Complete Stories (1997)
A Lost Grave	Esquire, May 1985	The People and Uncollected Stories (1989); The Complete Stories (1997)
Zora's Noise	GQ, January 1985	The People and Uncollected Stories (1989); The Complete Stories (1997)
In Kew Gardens	Partisan Review, Fall 1984 - Winter 1985	The People and Uncollected Stories (1989); The Complete Stories (1997)
Alma Redeemed	Commentary, July 1984.	The People and Uncollected Stories (1989); The Complete Stories (1997)
