= Tennant (surname) =

Tennant is a Scottish surname, and may refer to:

- Alan Tennant (1930–1997), English rugby league footballer of the 1940s and 1950s
- Alexander Tennant (1772–1814), British colonist of South Africa
- Amy Tennant (born 1994), English field hockey player
- Andrew Tennant (disambiguation) Andrew or Andy, multiple people
- Billy Tennant (footballer) (1865–1927), English footballer
- Charles Tennant (1768–1838), Scottish chemist and industrialist
- Christopher Tennant (born 1982), in Michigan Danish-American Ganjapreneur
- David Tennant (disambiguation), multiple people
- Don Tennant (1922–2001), American advertising executive
- Dorothy Tennant (1855–1926), British artist
- Edward Tennant, 1st Baron Glenconner (1859–1920), British politician
- Edward Tennant (1897–1916), British poet
- Emily Tennant (born 1990), American actress
- Emma Tennant (1937–2017), British novelist
- Forest Tennant, American physician and advocate for opioid pain medications
- Georgia Tennant (born 1984), English actress
- Harold Tennant (1865–1935), British politician
- Henry Tennant (disambiguation), multiple people
- Iain Tennant (1919–2006), British businessman
- James Tennant (disambiguation), multiple people
- Jan Tennant (born 1937), Canadian television journalist
- John Tennant (disambiguation), multiple people
- Kylie Tennant (1912–1988), Australian novelist, playwright, and historian
- Natalie Tennant (born 1967), U.S. politician
- Neil Tennant (born 1954), British musician with the Pet Shop Boys
- Neil Tennant (philosopher) (born 1950)
- Peter Tennant (cricketer), English cricketer
- Scott Tennant (born 1962), American classical guitarist and composer
- Smithson Tennant (1761–1815), British chemist
- Stella Tennant (1970–2020), Scottish model
- Stephen Tennant (1906–1987), British aristocratic eccentric
- Ty Tennant (born 2002), English actor
- Veronica Tennant (born 1946), Canadian ballerina
- Victoria Tennant (born 1950), British actress
- Walter Tennant (1921–2000), English rugby league footballer
- William Tennant (United Irishmen) (1759–1832), Ulster Presbyterian banker
- William Tennant (poet) (1784–1848), Scottish poet
- William Tennant (Royal Navy officer) (1890–1963), Royal Navy officer

== See also ==
- Baron Glenconner, family name Tennant
- Tennent
- Enriqueta Augustina Rylands, née Tennant
