= The Assistant =

The Assistant may refer to:

- The Assistant (Walser novel) (German: Der Gehülfe), a 1908 novel by Robert Walser
- The Assistant (Malamud novel), a 1957 novel by Bernard Malamud
- The Assistant (TV series), a satirical reality series starring Andy Dick.
- The Assistant (1982 film), a 1982 Czech film
- The Assistant (1998 film), a 1998 film
- The Assistant (2015 film), a 2015 film
- The Assistant (2019 film), a 2019 film
- The Assistant (2022 film), a 2022 film

== See also ==
- Factotum (novel), a 1975 novel by Charles Bukowski
