= The Tenants =

The Tenants may refer to:

- The Tenants (novel), a 1971 Bernard Malamud novel
- The Tenants (1987 film), Iranian film
- The Tenants (2005 film), film based on the Malamud novel
- The Tenants (2009 film), Brazilian film
- The Tenants (band), an Australian band

== See also ==
- Tenant (disambiguation)
