= Tennant =

Tennant may refer to:

- Tennant (surname), people with the surname Tennant
- Tennant, California, a US census-designated place
- Tennant, Iowa, a US town
- Tennant Company, a floor cleaning company founded in Minneapolis, MN
- Tennants, a company in North Yorkshire, England

== See also ==
- Tennant Creek (disambiguation), articles associated with the town in the Northern Territory of Australia
- Tenant (disambiguation)
- Tennent, a surname
