= Eddie Waitkus =

American baseball player (1919–1972)

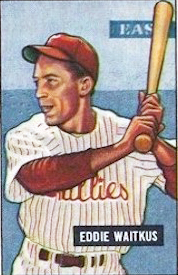
- First baseman
- Born: September 4, 1919; Cambridge, Massachusetts, U.S.
- Died: September 16, 1972 (aged 53); Jamaica Plain, Massachusetts, U.S.
- Batted: Left Threw: Left

MLB debut
- April 15, 1941, for the Chicago Cubs

Last MLB appearance
- September 20, 1955, for the Philadelphia Phillies

MLB statistics
- Batting average: .285
- Home runs: 24
- Runs batted in: 373
- Stats at Baseball Reference

Teams
- Chicago Cubs (1941, 1946–1948); Philadelphia Phillies (1949–1953); Baltimore Orioles (1954–1955); Philadelphia Phillies (1955)

Career highlights and awards
- 2× All-Star (1948, 1949)

Edward Stephen Waitkus (September 4, 1919 – September 16, 1972) was an American professional baseball player who played as a first baseman. He played a total of 11 seasons in Major League Baseball (MLB), before and after serving in World War II (1941 and 1946–1955). He played for the Chicago Cubs and Philadelphia Phillies in the National League and for the Baltimore Orioles of the American League. He was elected to the National League All-Star team twice (1948 and 1949).

== Early career, WWII ==
Waitkus, the son of Lithuanian immigrants, grew up in Boston and attended the Cambridge High and Latin School and Boston College. He began his professional career in 1938 playing for the Worumbo Indians, a semi-professional team sponsored by Worumbo Woolen Mill in Lisbon Falls, Maine. As a rookie, he was known as "the natural."

Waitkus saw some of the bloodiest fighting of World War II with the U.S. Army in the Philippines, and was awarded four Bronze Stars. During Operation Cartwheel, Waitkus saved the life of a badly bleeding fellow soldier, leaving his foxhole during an attack on his position, and finding some safety pins to stop the bleeding.

Upon his return to baseball, he quickly became a star for the Chicago Cubs. He also became a popular media figure, as he was well-educated and was fluent in Lithuanian, Polish, German, and French. Following the 1948 season, the Cubs traded Waitkus with Hank Borowy to the Philadelphia Phillies for Monk Dubiel and Dutch Leonard.

== Shooting ==
Just a few years into his career, Waitkus was shot by Ruth Ann Steinhagen, an obsessed fan, at Chicago's Edgewater Beach Hotel on June 14, 1949, in one of the earliest recognized cases of criminal stalking.

Steinhagen had become infatuated with him when he was a Cub, but seeing him every day in-season may have kept her obsession in check. Once he was traded to the Phillies, Steinhagen's obsession grew to dangerous proportions. She checked into the hotel using the alias "Ruth Ann Burns" and left a note at the desk, asking him to come to her hotel room on an urgent matter.

When he arrived in her room, she shot him with a .22 caliber rifle, a bolt-action Remington model 510. The bullet entered his lung, barely missing his heart. She immediately called the desk to report the shooting and was found cradling his head in her lap. Waitkus was taken to the Illinois Masonic Hospital, where he nearly died several times on the operating table before the bullet was successfully removed. Steinhagen never stood trial but instead was confined to a mental institution for a few years.

== Return to action ==
After being shot in Chicago, Waitkus did not play again in the 1949 season, in which he compiled a .306 batting average with 27 RBI and 41 runs scored in 54 games played. However Waitkus did return in uniform, although not to action, on August 19, 1949, for "Eddie Waitkus Night" at Shibe Park, at which he was feted by the Phillies and showered with gifts.

Waitkus returned to play in the 1950 season as the leadoff hitter for the Whiz Kids team that won the 1950 National League pennant. Waitkus led the team in scoring with 102 runs. Waitkus made his only post-season appearance in the 1950 World Series. After the 1950 season, Waitkus was named the Associated Press Comeback Player of the Year.

== Later life ==
Prior to the 1954 season, the Baltimore Orioles purchased Waitkus from the Philadelphia Phillies for $40,000 (equivalent to $480,000 in 2025). Released by the Orioles in 1955, he returned to the Phillies for the remainder of the season. After the 1955 baseball season was complete, the Phillies released Waitkus.

Following his baseball career, Waitkus worked in trucking in Buffalo, New York, and later as a manager at a department store in Waltham, Massachusetts. Waitkus died in a Boston hospital in 1972 from esophageal cancer, aged 53. A resident of Cambridge, Massachusetts, at the time of his death, he was survived by a son and a daughter.

== The Natural ==
The author Bernard Malamud may have woven the basic elements of the Waitkus story – including that some called Waitkus "The Natural" because of his natural swing – into his novel The Natural, together with other baseball legends (notably that of Joe Jackson). The book was published in 1952 and was made into a Hollywood film starring Robert Redford, released in 1984.

However, it is unclear if Malamud was inspired by the shooting of either Waitkus or the Cubs shortstop Billy Jurges, who was shot by his ex-girlfriend in 1932 at the Chicago hotel in which they lived.
