= James Tennant =

James Tennant may refer to:

- James Tennant (mineralogist) (1808–1881), English mineralogist
- James Tennant (RFC officer) (1896–?), Scottish World War I flying ace
- James Tennant (army officer) (1789–1854), British soldier
- James Francis Tennant (1829–1915), British soldier and astronomer
- Jim Tennant (1907–1967), American baseball player

== See also ==
- James Tennent (1888–1955), Scottish international rugby and cricket player
- James Emerson Tennent (1804–1869), Irish politician and traveller
