= Fidelman =

Fidelman may refer to:

- Greg Fidelman (born September 4, 1977) is an American engineer for Roadrunner Records
- Pictures of Fidelman is a short story collection by Bernard Malamud.
