= Ruth Ann Steinhagen =

American criminal

- Born: Ruth Catherine Steinhagen; December 23, 1929; Cicero, Illinois, U.S.
- Died: December 29, 2012 (aged 83); Chicago, Illinois, U.S.
- Known for: Shooting of Eddie Waitkus

Ruth Ann Steinhagen (born Ruth Catherine Steinhagen; December 23, 1929 – December 29, 2012) was an American woman who shot and nearly killed Eddie Waitkus, star first baseman of the Philadelphia Phillies, on June 14, 1949, in one of the first recorded instances of what later became known as stalker crimes. The incident is thought to have been one of the inspirations for the 1952 baseball novel The Natural, made into a 1984 film.

== Early life ==
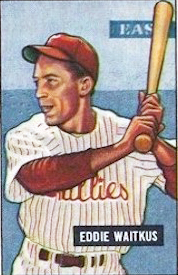
Image of Eddie Waitkus from a 1951 baseball card

Steinhagen was the daughter of parents who had emigrated from Berlin, Germany, in their early 20s. Born Ruth Catherine Steinhagen, she adopted the middle name Ann at some point in her youth.

When she was a child, Steinhagen's family moved to Lincoln Park, Chicago. She graduated from Jones Commercial High School in 1947, where she studied stenography.

== Prelude to the incident ==
A 19-year-old typist at the time of the incident, Steinhagen had developed an obsession with Eddie Waitkus after seeing him play as first baseman with the Chicago Cubs. Accounts vary as to when that was: a report in The Miami News the day after the shooting stated she first saw him play on July 7, 1946; a 1949 Time magazine article said she had seen him play "near the end of the 1946 season"; and John Theodore's 2002 biography of Waitkus indicates she later told her doctor she first saw him play on April 27, 1947.

While she never actually met him during that time, at home she created a "shrine" to Waitkus with hundreds of photographs and newspaper clippings, often spreading them out and looking at them for hours, according to her mother. She would also set an empty place across from her at dinner for Waitkus. Since the ballplayer was from the Boston area, she developed a craving for baked beans and, because Waitkus was of Lithuanian descent, she even studied Lithuanian for a time.

She told her doctors, after the incident, "I used to go to all the ball games to watch him. We used to wait for them to come out of the clubhouse after the game, and all the time I was watching I was building in my mind that idea of killing him." In 1948, Steinhagen's family sent her to a psychiatrist, but her obsession did not diminish, even after Waitkus was traded to the Philadelphia Phillies. After the shooting, police found extensive clippings in her suitcase and even pictures papering the ceiling of her bedroom.

== Shooting ==
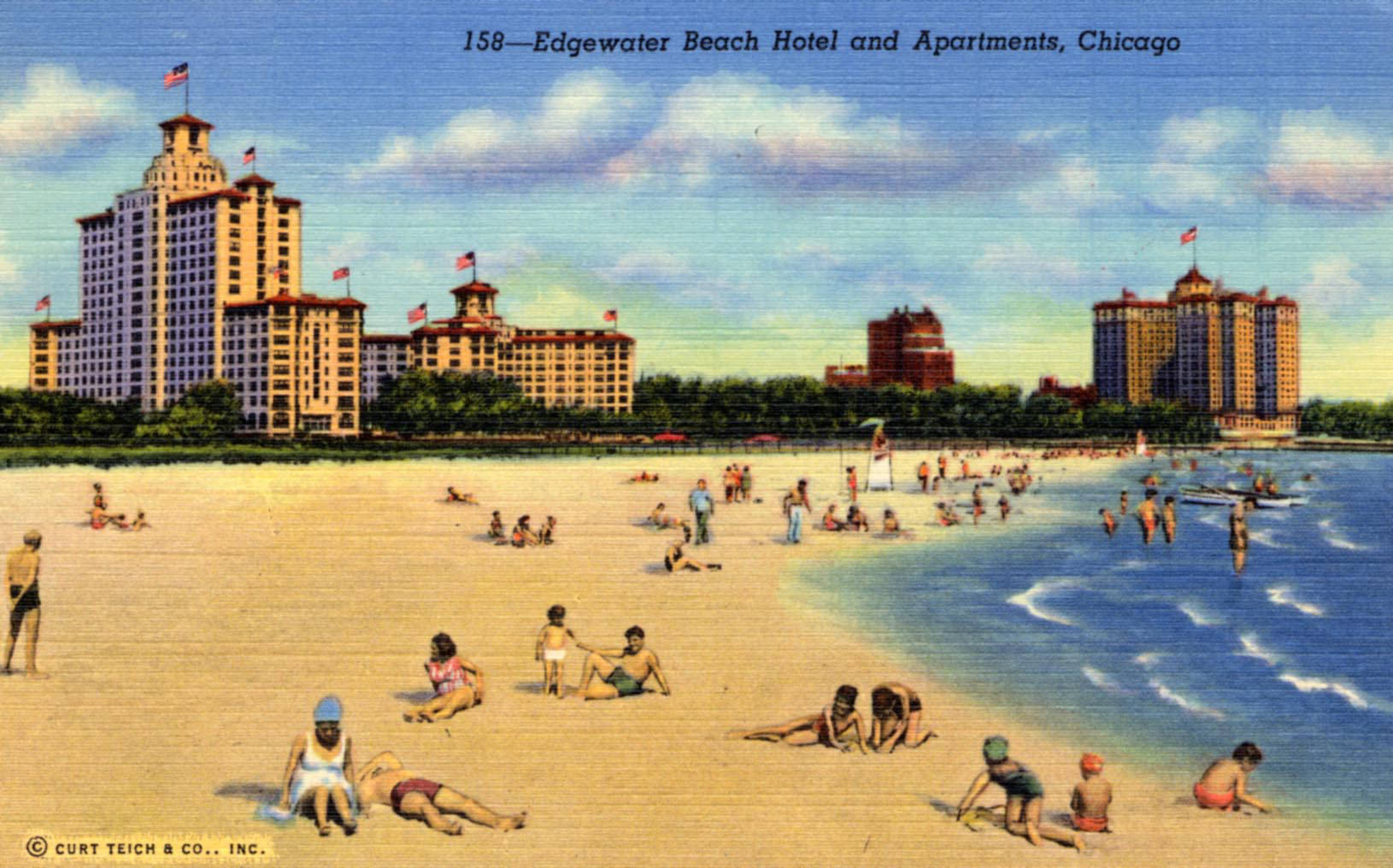
Circa 1941 postcard of the Edgewater Beach Hotel

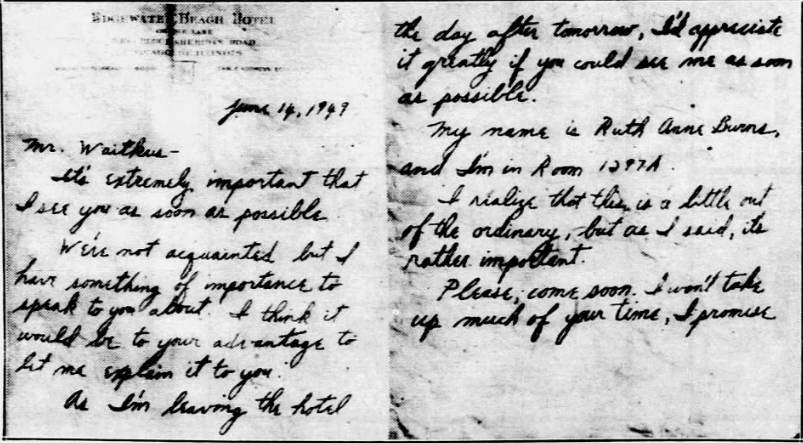
Note from Steinhagen to Eddie Waitkus

On June 14, 1949, the Phillies came to Chicago to face the Cubs; Waitkus played in the game, recording a hit and scoring two runs. After the game, which she attended, Steinhagen sent Waitkus a handwritten note through a bellboy, inviting him to visit her in her 12th floor room in the Edgewater Beach Hotel where they were both registered. Claiming to be "Ruth Anne Burns," Steinhagen wrote:

Mr. Waitkus–

It's extremely important that I see you as soon as possible

We're not acquainted, but I have something of importance to speak to you about I think it would be to your advantage to let me explain it to you

After insisting that she was leaving the hotel the next day and pressing the timeliness of the request, she concluded:

I realize this is a little out of the ordinary, but as I said, it's rather important

Please, come soon. I won't take up much of your time, I promise

According to Waitkus's teammate and hotel roommate, Russ Meyer, Waitkus received the note, which was affixed to the door of their 9th-floor room, after 11:00 p.m., having been out to dinner with Meyer's family and fiancée. Waitkus called the room, but the woman would not discuss the details over the phone. According to Meyer, Waitkus believed the note was from a friend of Ruth Ann Burns, a woman whom he was dating. The Charleston Sunday Gazette-Mail says Waitkus knew some people named Burns. For whatever reason, he went to meet her in the room. As Meyer later described the encounter, "Eddie goes up to the room, knocks on the door, and this broad answers the door. Eddie thinks he's in the wrong room. She said, 'No, you're Eddie Waitkus, aren't you? I'm a friend of Ruth Ann's.' She tells Eddie, 'Ruth Ann went to get a newspaper and she will be right back. Why don't you come in?'"

There is some variance in accounts of what happened next. According to an Associated Press report released the day after the shooting, Steinhagen told police that she told Waitkus when he entered, "I have a surprise for you," before retrieving a .22 caliber rifle (reported as a bolt-action Remington model 510) from the closet and shooting him in the chest. Meyer said that Waitkus told him that when he entered the room, the woman he met claimed to be a friend of Ruth Ann's, introducing herself as Mary Brown, and saying that Ruth Ann would be returning to the room immediately. He said that Waitkus claimed Steinhagen's words after retrieving the gun from the closet were, "If I can't have you, nobody else can." A 2001 Chicago Sun-Times story claims that Steinhagen said, "You're not going to bother me anymore." Waitkus, who later said he believed the woman was joking, stood and was shot. He said he asked her, as she knelt beside his prone body with her hand on his, "Oh, baby, what did you do that for?"

Steinhagen indicated that she had planned to stab him, and use the gun to shoot herself, but changed her plans when he quickly took a seat. Steinhagen still intended to shoot herself, but evidently could not find another bullet. While Waitkus was lying on the floor bleeding from the chest, Steinhagen called down to the front desk of the hotel and told them "I just shot a man ..." Thereafter, according to a report the following day in The Miami News, she went to wait for them on the benches near the elevator; however, a much later article in The Washington Times indicates she held Waitkus' head on her lap until help arrived.

The phone call, which brought quick medical attention as well as police, saved Waitkus' life.

== Arrest and court appearance ==
Steinhagen was arrested and then arraigned on June 30, 1949. Questioned about the shooting, she told police she did not know why she had done it, telling an assistant state's attorney that she wanted "to do something exciting in my life."

Taken to Waitkus' hospital room the day after the shooting, she told him, as well, that she didn't know for sure why she had done it. She told a psychiatrist before she went to court that "I didn't want to be nervous all my life", and explained to reporters that "the tension had been building up within me, and I thought killing someone would relieve it"— a murderous impulse that had been with her for at least two years. She said she had first seen Waitkus three years before, and that he reminded her "of everybody, especially my father."

Steinhagen's counsel presented a petition to the court saying that their client was "unable to cooperate with counsel in the defense of her cause" and did not "understand the nature of the charge against her." The petition requested a sanity hearing. At the ensuing sanity hearing (which also occurred on June 30, 1949), Dr. William Haines, a court-appointed psychiatrist, testified that Steinhagen had "schizophrenia in an immature individual" and was mentally ill. Chief Judge James McDermott of the Criminal Court of Cook County then directed the jury to find her insane, and ordered her committed to Kankakee State Hospital. The judge also struck "with leave to reinstate" the grand jury's indictment of Steinhagen on a charge of assault with intent to commit murder, meaning that prosecutors could refile the charge if Steinhagen recovered her sanity.

== Later events ==
The bullet that struck Waitkus lodged in a lung, threatening his life and preventing his returning to baseball for the rest of the season. He returned the following year (the 1950 Phillies, nicknamed the "Whiz Kids", advanced to the World Series) and played through the 1955 season.

Steinhagen was confined and treated at the institution until 1952, when she was declared cured and released. Waitkus did not press charges against Steinhagen after she was released, telling an assistant state's attorney that he wanted to forget the incident.

After her release, Steinhagen moved back home to live with her parents and her younger sister in her parents' small apartment on Chicago's North Side. She shunned publicity in the ensuing decades. Little information is publicly available about the remainder of her life, which was quiet and secluded. She steadfastly maintained her privacy, avoided reporters, and refused to comment publicly on her shooting of Waitkus. Waitkus biographer John Theodore said about her, "She chose to live in the shadows and she did a good job of it."

It is known that, in 1970, Steinhagen and her family purchased a home in Albany Park, Chicago. She lived in the home for the rest of her life. She lived there with her sister after their parents died in the early 1990s. She continued to live there after her sister died in 2007, employing full-time caregivers in her final years. There is no evidence she ever married. Discoverable evidence of employment that she may have had is virtually nonexistent. A neighbor of hers told John Theodore that Steinhagen had said that she worked in an office job for 35 years, but Steinhagen never told the neighbor where she worked and the neighbor never asked her. Court records and other background checks reveal no information about her career.

On December 29, 2012, Steinhagen died in a Chicago hospital of a subdural hematoma that was the result of an accidental fall in her home. Her death was not publicly reported until nearly three months after it occurred; the Chicago Tribune learned of it while searching death records in connection with another story. Steinhagen was 83 years old, and left no immediate survivors.

== Influence ==
As one of the first known instances of what later became known as stalker crimes, the incident for several years "had a profoundly anti-aphrodisiacal effect on traveling athletes", according to The Boston Globe. It prompted a magazine article from the sportswriter Al Stump entitled "Baseball's Biggest Headache— Dames!" It is believed to have been one of Bernard Malamud's inspirations for his 1952 novel The Natural, later made into a like-named film in 1984, in which the actress Barbara Hershey played a role analogous to Steinhagen's story. In 1992, Steinhagen's was the oldest incident among 83 incorporated into "Preventing Assassination", a Secret Service study of celebrity and political assassinations. The story of Steinhagen and Waitkus was referenced in two episodes of Archer, "Once Bitten" (2013) and "Robert De Niro" (2019). In "Once Bitten," although the character resembling Steinhagen is instead named "Ruth Anne Litzenberger," the main protagonist hallucinates a similar incident wherein he is the victim. In "Robert De Niro," the main protagonist references the story of Waitkus in response to being told that he was shot by a "crazy woman."

In 2002, the American folk musician Chuck Brodsky released an album,The Baseball Ballads, that included a song entitled "The Unnatural Shooting of Eddie Waitkus." It recounted the incident in a wry tone reminiscent of Bob Dylan's "Hurricane."

The incident, which required four surgeries, is said to have influenced Waitkus's career and probably his personal life as well, as his baseball statistics after the shooting were never the same, (Note: During his truncated 1949 season, Waitkus recorded career highs for batting average, on-base percentage, and slugging percentage.) and he developed a great concern that others might not understand why he had visited Steinhagen's room. He also, according to Meyer, developed a drinking problem after the incident. Waitkus died in a Boston hospital in 1972 from esophageal cancer, aged 53.
