= Bruce Weintraub =

American set decorator

- Born: February 28, 1952; New York City, New York
- Died: December 14, 1985 (aged 33); Los Angeles, California
- Occupation: Set decorator
- Years active: 1975-1985

Bruce Weintraub (February 28, 1952 – December 14, 1985) was an American set decorator. He was nominated for an Academy Award in the category Best Art Direction for the film The Natural. He died from AIDS, aged 33.

== Selected filmography ==
- The Rose (1979)
- Scarface (1983)
- The Natural (1984)
- Prizzi's Honor (1985)
- Pretty in Pink (1986)
