= The Magic Barrel =

1958 short story collection by Bernard Malamud

- 1st edition dust-jacket
- Author: Bernard Malamud
- Cover artist: Milton Glaser
- Language: English
- Genre: Fiction (short stories)
- Set in: New York City and Italy
- Published: 1958; Jewish Publication Society; Farrar, Straus & Cudahy
- Publication place: US
- Media type: Print (hardcover)
- Pages: 214
- Awards: National Book Award for Fiction (1959)
- OCLC: 289279
- Preceded by: The Assistant (1957)
- Followed by: A New Life (1961)

The Magic Barrel is a 1958 collection of thirteen short stories written by Bernard Malamud and published by Farrar, Straus & Giroux. Also, the Jewish Publication Society released its own edition at the same time. It won the 1959 U.S. National Book Award for Fiction. It was also Malamud's debut collection of stories.

== Overview ==
Many of the individual stories collected in The Magic Barrel depict the search for hope and meaning within the bleak enclosures of poor urban settings. The title story focuses on the unlikely relationship of Leo Finkle, an unmarried rabbinical student, and Pinye Salzman, a colorful marriage broker. Finkle has spent most of life with his nose buried in books and therefore isn't well-educated in life itself. However, Finkle has a greater interest – the art of romance. He engages the services of Salzman, who shows Finkle a number of potential brides from his "magic barrel" but with each picture Finkle grows more uninterested. After Salzman convinces him to meet Lily Hirschorn, Finkle realizes his life is truly empty and lacking the passion to love God or humanity. When Finkle discovers a picture of Salzman's daughter and sees her suffering, he sets out on a new mission to save her. Other well-known stories included in the collection are: "The Last Mohican", "Angel Levine", "The First Seven Years", and "The Mourners". This last story focuses on Kessler, the defiant old man in need of "social security" and Gruber, the belligerent landlord who doesn't want Kessler in the tenement anymore.

The 13 stories included in The Magic Barrel appear in the following sequence:

- "The First Seven Years"
- "The Mourners"
- "The Girl of My Dreams"
- "Angel Levine"
- "Behold the Key"
- "Take Pity"
- "The Prison"
- "The Lady of the Lake"
- "A Summer's Reading"
- "The Bill"
- "The Last Mohican"
- "The Loan"
- "The Magic Barrel"

== Stories ==
This section provides a brief capsule, or synopsis, view of each story, including publication information and links to relevant articles. Also see: Bernard Malamud bibliography for additional details:

- "The First Seven Years"– first published in the Partisan Review (September–October 1950 issue)
- "The Mourners – first appeared in Discovery in January, 1955
- "The Girl of My Dreams" – originally appeared in American Mercury, January 1953
- "The Angel Levine" – adapted for the screen, The Angel Levine is a 1970 film starring Harry Belafonte and Zero Mostel and directed by Ján Kadár.
- "Behold the Key" – this is one of five "Italian" stories (i.e., set in Italy) Malamud wrote, excluding the 6 stories that appeared in Pictures of Fidelman.
- "Take Pity"
- "The Prison" – first appeared in Commentary (September 1950 issue).
- "The Lady of the Lake"
- "A Summer's Reading"
- "The Bill"
- "The Last Mohican"
- "The Loan"
- "The Magic Barrel"

Synopsis – The title story starts as the about-to-be rabbi Leo Finkle has been urged by his teachers to find a wife before he actually becomes a rabbi; he gets a bigger congregation that way, they say. Because he is quite incapable (he recognizes this later on in the story and presumes his study stole his social life) and has almost finished his study (and thus has to hurry), he answers an ad of a marriage counselor. Unhappy and terribly sorry about a meeting with one of the proposed women, he retreats back again to his study. The marriage counselor suddenly turns up delivering him photographs of women, which he initially ignores. However, something draws him to them and after viewing several of them he discovers another one in the envelope. He instantly falls in love with that picture and yearns to meet her. After he's found the marriage counselor (who left him immediately after delivering the photographs) the girl turns out to be the counselor's daughter (though at first the counselor states it's one of the photographs that should have been in the barrel; hence Finkle thinks of the barrel as magic). He gets to meet her anyway; the marriage counselor (her father) hiding around the corner, "chanting prayers for the dead", i e, The Kaddish.

Marc Blitzstein adapted the story as a libretto for a one-act opera, the music for which he began but completed only a scene and a song. Said song was premiered at the 1964 Marc Blitzstein Memorial Concert conducted by Leonard Bernstein and recorded on Koch by William Sharp. A performance of it by Erin Passmore, introduced and accompanied by Leonard Lehrman at the 2012 Halifax Summer Opera Workshop, was videotaped and posted on YouTube.
