= Janna Malamud Smith =

American non-fiction writer (born 1952)

- Born: Janna Ellen Malamud; January 1952 (age 74); Corvallis, Oregon
- Citizenship: American
- Education: Harvard University (A.B.); Smith College (M.S.W)
- Occupations: Writer, psychotherapist, teacher
- Spouse: David Smith
- Children: 2
- Relatives: Bernard Malamud (father)
- Writing career
- Years active: 1997–present
- Genres: non-fiction, essays
- Website: jannamalamudsmith.com

Janna Malamud Smith (born 1952) is an American non-fiction writer. She was born in Corvallis, Oregon in 1952, the second of two children born to Ann DeChiara Malamud and the writer Bernard Malamud. She grew up in Oregon, then in Bennington, Vermont, and Cambridge, Massachusetts. She received her A.B. from Harvard University in 1973, majoring in American history and literature, and an M.S.W. in 1979 from Smith College. She practices and teaches psychotherapy in the Boston area. She is married to David Smith, and is the mother of two children.

Smith has lectured widely, and has published nationally and internationally in many newspapers, magazines and journals. She is the author of five books. The first two, Private Matters: In Defense of the Personal Life (1997) and A Potent Spell: Mother Love and the Power of Fear (2003) were both chosen as “Notable Books” by The New York Times Sunday Book Review. Her third, My Father is a Book: A Memoir of Bernard Malamud (2006) received a starred review from Publishers Weekly, was selected as a Washington Post “Best Book of the Year”, and a New York Times “Editors’ Choice”. Smith has had essays republished in Best American Essays in 2004 and 2009. She is a lecturer in psychology at Harvard Medical School, and was on the editorial board of The Harvard Mental Health Letter until it ceased publication in 2012. As well as teaching about psychotherapy, she teaches workshops in aspects of non-fiction writing.

== Selected bibliography ==
- Private Matters: In Defense of the Personal Life. (Reading, Massachusetts: Addison Wesley, 1997) ISBN 0201409739
- A Potent Spell: Mother Love and the Power of Fear. (Boston: Houghton Mifflin, 2003) ISBN 0618063498
- Private Matters: In Defense of the Personal Life. Updated edition with new preface, and new chapter “Privacy Post-9/11.” (Seal Press, 2004) ISBN 1580051073
- My Father Is A Book: A Memoir of Bernard Malamud. (Houghton Mifflin, 2006) ISBN 0618691669
- An Absorbing Errand: How Artists and Craftsmen Make Their Way to Mastery. (Counterpoint, 2012) ISBN 1619020041
- When the Island Had Fish: The Remarkable Story of a Maine Fishing Community. (Down East Books, 2023) ISBN 1684750784
