= Tennent =

Tennent is a surname, and may refer to:

- Blair Tennent (1898–1976), New Zealand politician
- David Hilt Tennent 1873–1941), American developmental biologist
- Gilbert Tennent (1703–1764), Irish Presbyterian clergyman
- H. M. Tennent (1879–1941), British theatre impresario
- Hector Tennent (1842–1904), Australian cricketer
- Hugh Tennent (1863–1890), Scottish brewer known for beginning the production of Wellpark Brewery's "Tennent's Lager"
- James Emerson Tennent (1804–1869), British politician
- John Tennent (disambiguation)
- Madge Tennent (1889–1972), American artist of Hawaii
- Peter Tennent, mayor of New Plymouth, New Zealand
- William Tennent (1673–1746), Scottish-American Presbyterian clergyman
- William Tennent III (1740–1777), Presbyterian clergyman and colonial patriot

== See also ==
- Tennent, New Jersey
- Tennent Caledonian or Tennent's, a brewery company in Glasgow
- Tenant (disambiguation)
- Tennant (disambiguation)
