= Tennant Creek (disambiguation) =

Tennant Creek is a town and a locality in the Northern Territory of Australia.

Tennant Creek may also refer to the following places in the Northern Territory:

- Tennant Creek Airport, an airport
- Tennant Creek Telegraph Station, a historic building
- Town of Tennant Creek, a former local government area
- Tennant Creek Hospital Outpatients Department, former hospital now used as a museum

== See also ==
- Tennant (disambiguation)
- Church of Christ the King, Tennant Creek
