= David Tennant (disambiguation) =

David Tennant (born 1971) is a Scottish actor.

David Tennant or Tennent may also refer to:

- David Tennant (aristocrat) (1902–1968), founder of the Gargoyle Club
- David Tennant (politician) (1829–1905), Cape Colony politician
- Dave Tennant (born 1945), English football goalkeeper (Walsall FC, Lincoln City, Rochdale AFC)
- David Hilt Tennent (1873–1941), American biologist and professor

== See also ==
- Tennant (surname)
