= John Tennent =

John Tennent may refer to:

- John Tennent (courtier)
- John Tennent (cricketer)
- John Tennent (footballer)

== See also ==
- John Tennant (disambiguation)
