= The Tenants (2005 film) =

- Directed by: Danny Green
- Written by: David Diamond; Danny Green (adaptation); Bernard Malamud (novel)
- Produced by: Chris Bongirne
- Starring: Snoop Dogg; Dylan McDermott; Rose Byrne
- Cinematography: David Dubois
- Edited by: Michael J. Duthie
- Music by: Leigh Gorman; Coati Mundi
- Distributed by: Millennium Films
- Release dates: October 26, 2005 (Asheville Film Festival); February 3, 2006 (United States)
- Running time: 91 minutes
- Country: United States
- Language: English

The Tenants is a 2005 film drama directed by Danny Green and starring Dylan McDermott and Snoop Dogg. It is based on the 1971 novel The Tenants by Bernard Malamud.

== Premise ==
In an abandoned tenement, a militant African-American writer and a Jewish novelist develop a friendship while struggling to complete their novels before the landlord forcibly evicts them, but interpersonal tensions rise between the tenants and escalate into violence.

== Cast ==
- Dylan McDermott as Harry Lesser
- Snoop Dogg as Willie Spearmint
- Rose Byrne as Irene Bell
- Seymour Cassel as Levenspiel
- Niki J. Crawford as Mary Kettlesmith
- Aldis Hodge as Sam Clemence
- Gene Gilbert as Mr. Ross
- Linda Lawson as Anna
