= The Assistant (1997 film) =

- Movie poster
- Directed by: Daniel Petrie
- Screenplay by: Daniel Petrie
- Based on: The Assistant by Bernard Malamud
- Starring: Gil Bellows; Armin Mueller-Stahl; Joan Plowright; Kate Greenhouse
- Cinematography: Alain Dostie; Philip Earnshaw
- Edited by: Susan Maggi; Peter Watson
- Music by: Lawrence Shragge
- Distributed by: Lionsgate Films
- Release dates: September 11, 1997 (TIFF); May 1, 1998 (Canada)
- Running time: 98 minutes
- Country: Canada
- Language: English

The Assistant is a 1997 drama film directed by Daniel Petrie and starring Gil Bellows, Armin Mueller-Stahl, Joan Plowright, and Kate Greenhouse. It is based on the 1957 novel of the same name by Bernard Malamud and was also the final theatrical film directed by Petrie before his death in 2004. It follows a young man who finds work at a shop at the turn-of-the-century, and falls in love with the owner's daughter, inflaming deeply religious origins. Filming took place in Toronto.

== Cast ==
- Gil Bellows as Frank Alpine
- Armin Mueller-Stahl as Morris Bober
- Joan Plowright as Ida Bober
- Jaimz Woolvett as Ward Minogue
- Frank Moore as Detective Minogue
