= Tenant =

Tenant may refer to:

== Real estate ==
- Tenant, the holder of a leasehold estate in real estate
  - Tenancy, the resulting status
- Tenant-in-chief, in feudal land law
- Tenement (law), the holder of a legal interest in real estate
- Tenant farmer, a farmer residing on land owned by another
- Anchor tenant, one of the larger stores in a shopping mall

== Film and literature ==
- Tenant (film), 2024 film starring Satyam Rajesh and Megha Chowdhury
- The Tenant (novel), a novel by Roland Topor
- The Tenant (1976 film), 1976 Roman Polanski film based on Topor's novel
- The Tenant (1957 film), a 1957 Spanish drama film
- The Tenant (2023 film), an Indian film by Sushrut Jain

== Other uses ==
- Door tenant, lawyers who work from premises of a barristers' chamber
- Tenant, a group of users who share a common access to a multitenancy software system

== See also ==
- The Tenants (disambiguation)
- Tennant (disambiguation)
- Tenet (disambiguation)
- Tennent, a surname
