= The Natural (film) =

1984 US sports drama film by Barry Levinson

- Theatrical release poster
- Directed by: Barry Levinson
- Screenplay by: Roger Towne; Phil Dusenberry
- Based on: The Natural; 1952 novel by Bernard Malamud
- Produced by: Mark Johnson
- Starring: Robert Redford; Robert Duvall; Glenn Close; Kim Basinger; Wilford Brimley; Barbara Hershey; Robert Prosky; Richard Farnsworth
- Cinematography: Caleb Deschanel
- Edited by: Stu Linder
- Music by: Randy Newman
- Production company: Delphi II Productions
- Distributed by: Tri-Star Pictures
- Release date: May 11, 1984
- Running time: 138 minutes 144 minutes (Director's Cut)
- Country: United States
- Language: English
- Budget: $28 million
- Box office: $48 million

The Natural is a 1984 American sports drama film based on Bernard Malamud's 1952 novel of the same name. Directed by Barry Levinson, the film stars Robert Redford, Robert Duvall, Glenn Close, Kim Basinger, Wilford Brimley, Barbara Hershey, Robert Prosky and Richard Farnsworth. Like the novel, the film recounts the experiences of Roy Hobbs, a man with great "natural" baseball talent, spanning his long but interrupted career in the sport. In direct contrast to the novel, the film ends on a positive tone. It was the first film produced by Tri-Star Pictures.

The film was nominated for four Academy Awards, including Best Supporting Actress (Close), and for a Golden Globe Award for Best Supporting Actress (Basinger). Many of the baseball scenes were filmed in 1983 at War Memorial Stadium in Buffalo, New York, built in 1937 and demolished in 1989. All-High Stadium, also in Buffalo, stood in for Chicago's Wrigley Field in a key scene.

== Plot ==
In the 1910s Midwest, Roy Hobbs learns baseball from his father Ed, who suffers a fatal heart attack. Lightning strikes a nearby tree, from which Roy makes a bat that he brands with a lightning bolt and the legend "Wonderboy".

In 1923, 19-year-old Roy leaves behind his girlfriend, Iris Gaines, for a tryout with the Chicago Cubs arranged by scout Sam Simpson. On the train, Sam and Roy are snubbed by "The Whammer," a swaggering batter in the mold of Babe Ruth and sportswriter Max Mercy. While stopped at a carnival, Sam bets Max that Roy can strike out the Whammer in three pitches. Roy does so, drawing the attention of Harriet Bird, who has a murderous fixation on athletes. Harriet lures Roy to her Chicago hotel room, shoots him in the stomach, then throws herself out the window. Health complications derail Roy's baseball career.

Despite his age and unknown past, in 1939 the 35-year-old Roy is signed to the New York Knights, Major League Baseball's last-place team. The team's manager and part owner, Pop Fisher, nearly demotes Roy to the Class B league but is impressed by his power hitting during batting practice. During a game against the Philadelphia Phillies, Roy pinch hits for star player Bartholomew "Bump" Bailey. Using "Wonderboy", Roy hits a triple that knocks the cover off the ball, making him an overnight sensation.

News of Roy's growing fame reaches Iris, now living in Chicago. In a game against the St. Louis Cardinals, Bump dies after crashing through the outfield wall while trying to make a catch. Roy becomes the starting right fielder and his hitting pulls the Knights up the National League standings. Assistant manager Red Blow reveals that Pop was forced to sell controlling interest in the team to a new owner, the Judge, but will regain ownership if the Knights win the pennant. Unlike Bump, Roy refuses the Judge's bribe to throw the season.

At practice, Max sees Roy pitch a fastball that almost tears through the backstop's netting, then recognizes him from striking out the Whammer. He introduces Roy to bookie Gus Sands, and Roy begins a romance with Gus's confidante Memo Paris, Pop's niece. Pop believes Memo is bad luck and Roy and the Knights drop into a slump, which continues into a Wrigley Field game against the Cubs. Spotting Iris in the stands, Roy shatters the scoreboard clock with a game-winning home run. They meet briefly and after another win the following day, Roy walks Iris home, and she reveals she has a teenage son named Ted. Their reunion restores Roy's prowess and the Knights surge into first place.

At a party, Roy collapses and is taken to a hospital. A doctor discovers Harriet's silver bullet, shows it to Roy, and tells him it may prove fatal if he continues playing. The Knights lose three games in a row, setting up a one-game playoff against the Pittsburgh Pirates at Knights Field. The Judge offers Roy $20,000 (equivalent to $463,000 in 2025) to throw the game and reveals he has already bribed another player. When Roy refuses, the Judge threatens to reveal photos of Harriet's body and blame Roy for her death. Roy rejects the bribe and is not intimidated by the blackmail.

During the game, Roy deduces that the Knights' pitcher was also bribed but convinces him to play his best. In the dugout, Roy receives a note from Iris, who is attending the game with Ted, and learns that he is Ted's father. With the Knights trailing in the bottom of the ninth inning, Roy hits a foul ball that splits "Wonderboy." He tells batboy Bobby Savoy to choose another bat and Bobby retrieves the "Savoy Special", a bat he made with Roy's guidance. Bleeding through his uniform, Roy smashes a home run into the stadium lights, destroying them in a power surge that cascades into a shower of sparks, winning the game and the pennant for the Knights. Back on their farm, Iris watches Roy and Ted play catch in the same field where Roy and Ed used to play.

== Cast ==
- Robert Redford as Roy Hobbs
  - Paul Sullivan Jr. as Young Roy Hobbs
- Robert Duvall as Max Mercy
- Glenn Close as Iris Gaines
  - Rachel Hall as Young Iris Gaines
- Kim Basinger as Memo Paris
- Wilford Brimley as Populus "Pop" Fisher
- Barbara Hershey as Harriet Bird
- Robert Prosky as The Judge
- Richard Farnsworth as "Red" Blow
- Joe Don Baker as "The Whammer"
- Michael Madsen as Bartholomew "Bump" Bailey
- John Finnegan as Sam Simpson
- Jon Van Ness as John Olsen
- Alan Fudge as Ed Hobbs
- Robert Rich III as Ted Hobbs
- Mickey Treanor as "Doc" Dizzy
- George Wilkosz as Bobby Savoy
- Anthony J. Ferrara as Coach Wilson
- Phil Mankowski as Hank Benz
- Danny Aiello III as Emil LaJong
- Ken Grassano as Al Fowler
- Barry Kivel as Pat McGee
- Mike Starr as Boone
- Sibby Sisti as Pirates Manager
- Philip D. Rosenberg as Herman Youngberry
- Christopher B. Rehbaum as John Rhoades
- Darren McGavin as Gus Sands (uncredited)

== Production ==
=== Pre-production ===
Malcolm Kahn and Robert Bean acquired the rights to Bernard Malamud's 1952 novel The Natural in 1976. Phil Dusenberry wrote the first adaptation. In October 1981, Roger Towne, a Columbia Pictures story editor and brother of Robert Towne, quit to produce and write the screenplay, with Bean set to direct and Kahn co-producing. In 1983, newly formed Tri-Star Pictures acquired the rights to the film adaptation, its first production. It was Robert Redford's first acting role in three years. The film's producers stated in the DVD extras they did not intended a strict adaptation of the novel, instead explaing how film was merely "based on" the novel. Malamud's daughter said on one of the DVD extras that her father had seen the film and felt that it had "legitimized him as a writer."

=== Casting ===
Darren McGavin was cast late in the process as the gambler Gus Sands and was uncredited in the film. Out of a disagreement, he chose not to be credited, though Barry Levinson later wanted to credit him and McGavin refused.

Levinson stated on the DVD extras for the 2007 how he recorded the film's narration himself as the tight production schedule left no time to hire a professional voice over performer.

=== Filming ===
Two-thirds of the scenes were filmed in Buffalo, New York, mostly at War Memorial Stadium, built in 1937 and demolished in 1989. At the time of filming, the stadium was the home of the Buffalo Bisons, a Minor League Baseball team who were then playing in the Double A level Eastern League and would move up to Triple A and the International League in 1985 (that team was actually the second Buffalo Bisons to play at the stadium. The original Bisons had actually played in the Triple A International League and were tenants at the stadium from 1961–1970). With a spectator capacity of 46,206, it was the second-largest venue in the Minors in 1983/84 (behind Denver's then–75,123 capacity Mile High Stadium), and the sixth-largest regular Minor League stadium in history.

Although War Memorial Stadium had long been used as a baseball stadium, it was in fact a rectangular venue built primarily for football. As such, it had both right and right-center field fences between 20 and 30 feet closer to the diamond than those in left field. The film's directors were careful not to include any high shots of the stadium that would show the compromised field dimensions (especially since Robert Redford's Roy Hobbs character is a left-handed power hitter, right field being his natural pulling side), while any views of the right-field fence and stands were shot from ground level, no closer than the pitcher's mound, to make the stadium appear to be a baseball field of regulation size. Balls Roy hits into the stands are shown in slow motion to exaggerate their distance. Since the diamond was close to the field's northwest corner, the directors were also careful not to show the long distance between the left-field outfield fences and the bleacher seats at the stadium's eastern end. The home plate was in the northwest corner, placing the diamond on the opposite side of the field from the main grandstand and press box, so that the main stand for football became the center-field bleachers during baseball games.

Buffalo's All-High Stadium, with post-production alterations, stood in for Chicago's Wrigley Field in a key scene in the film. Additional filming took place at the New York and Lake Erie Railroad depot in South Dayton, New York. Cece Carlucci, an umpire from the Pacific Coast League, made the umpiring gear used in the film.

==== Cinematography and post-production ====
Director of photography Caleb Deschanel had a long-running fascination for autochrome photography, the earliest commercial color process. This photographic process, invented by the Lumière brothers in 1907, involved light filtered through randomly-aligned grains of potato starch that had been dyed in the primary colors and then used to expose a black and white glass negative. When developed and seen in transmission, like a film slide (the only means of viewing an autochrome), the effect was a somewhat desaturated color monoprint made from three, sandwiched glass panes with a tonal range reminiscent of watercolors. Deschanel searched for a way to replicate this look for the flashback scenes in The Natural.

He hit upon an unusual post-production process. Deschanel struck a black and white print of the film and used an optical printer to combine this footage with a color print of the same material in which the color saturations had been strongly raised. The result was an answer print with delicate, bloomed colors and a strong black register. Because the effect diminished in generations more distant from the original interpositive prints, Deschanel's intentions for the film are best seen in high-resolution, home media formats such as 4K Blu-ray releases.

== Release ==
=== Reception ===
Variety called it an "impeccably made ... fable about success and failure in America." James Berardinelli praised The Natural as "[a]rguably the best baseball movie ever made". ESPN's Page 2 selected it as the sixth best sports movie of all time. Sports writer Bill Simmons has argued, "Any 'Best Sports Movies' list that doesn't feature either Hoosiers or The Natural as the No. 1 pick shouldn't even count." Director Barry Levinson said on MLB Network's Costas at the Movies in 2013 that while the film is based in fantasy, "through the years, these things which are outlandish actually [happen] ... like Kirk Gibson hitting the home run and limping around the bases ... Curt Schilling with the blood on the sock in the World Series."

Leonard Maltin's 18th annual Movie Guide edition called it "too long and inconsistent." Dan Craft, longtime critic for the Bloomington, Illinois paper, The Pantagraph, wrote, "The storybook ending is so preposterous you don't know whether to cheer or jeer." In Sports Illustrated, Frank Deford had faint praise for it: "The Natural almost manages to be a swell movie." John Simon of National Review and Richard Schickel of Time were disappointed with the adaptation. Simon contrasted Malamud's story about the "failure of American innocence" with Levinson's "fable of success ... [and] the ultimate triumph of semi-doltish purity," declaring "you have, not Malamud's novel, but a sorry illustration of its theme". Schickel lamented that "Malamud's intricate ending (it is a victory that looks like a defeat) is vulgarized (the victory is now an unambiguous triumph, fireworks included)," and that "watching this movie is all too often like reading about The Natural in the College Outline series."

Roger Ebert called it "idolatry on behalf of Robert Redford." Ebert's television At the Movies collaborator Gene Siskel praised it, giving it four stars, also putting down other critics that he suggested might have just recently read the novel for the first time. In a lengthy article on baseball movies in The New Yorker, Roger Angell pointed out that Malamud had intentionally treated Roy's story as a baseball version of the King Arthur legend, which came across in the film as a bit heavy-handed, "portentous and stuffy," and that the book's ending should have been kept. He also cited several excellent visuals and funny bits and noted that Redford had prepared so carefully for the role, modeling his swing on that of Ted Williams, that "you want to sign him up."

The film review aggregator website Rotten Tomatoes retrospectively compiled reviews from 48 critics to give the film a score of 83%, with an average rating of 7.2/10. The website's consensus reads: "Though heavy with sentiment, The Natural is an irresistible classic, and a sincere testament to America's national pastime." The film received a Metacritic score of 61 based on 19 reviews, indicating "generally favorable reviews".

=== Awards and honors ===
The Natural was nominated for four Academy Awards: Best Supporting Actress (Glenn Close), Best Cinematography (Caleb Deschanel), Best Art Direction (Mel Bourne, Angelo P. Graham, Bruce Weintraub) and Best Original Score (Randy Newman) at the 57th Academy Awards. Kim Basinger was also nominated for the Golden Globe Award for Best Supporting Actress at the 42nd Golden Globes.

== Home media ==
The initial DVD edition, with copyright year on the box reading "2001", contained the theatrical version of the film, along with a few specials and commentaries.

The "director's cut" was released on April 3, 2007. A two-disc edition, it contains the featurette "The Heart of the Natural," a 44-minute documentary featuring comments from Cal Ripken Jr. and Levinson; it is the only extra released originally with the 2001 DVD. Sony added a number of other extras, however, including: "When Lightning Strikes: Creating The Natural," a 50-minute documentary discussing the origins of the original novel and the production of the film; "Knights in Shining Armor," which addresses the mythological parallels between The Natural, King Arthur and the Odyssey; and "A Natural Gunned Down" which tells the story of Eddie Waitkus, a baseball player who was shot by female stalker Ruth Ann Steinhagen in an incident which some think inspired the fictionalized shooting of Roy Hobbs. The film itself has been re-edited, restoring deleted footage to the early chapters of the story. These scenes expand on Roy's sadness, focusing on his visits to his childhood home as an adult and his childhood memories. The "gift set" version of the release also included some souvenirs: a baseball "signed" by Roy Hobbs; some baseball cards of Hobbs and teammates; and a New York Knights cap.

The 35th anniversary 4k edition was released by Sony Pictures in 2019. The new 4k transfer was made from the original camera negative. The source material was in good condition and required only minimally invasive processing. This 35th anniversary 4k edition is highly praised for outstanding quality of the image and the sound on both the 4k and the Blu-ray Disc.

== Soundtrack ==
The film score of The Natural was composed and conducted by Randy Newman. The score has often been compared to the style of Aaron Copland and sometimes Elmer Bernstein. Scott Montgomery, writing for Goldmine music magazine, referenced the influence and David Ansen, reviewing the film for Newsweek, called the score "Coplandesque". The score also has certain Wagnerian features of orchestration and use of leitmotif. Adnan Tezer of Monsters and Critics noted the theme is often played for film and television previews and in "baseball stadiums when introducing home teams and players".

Levinson also described to Bob Costas in MLB Network's Costas at the Movies how he heard Newman develop the movie's iconic theme: "We were racing to try to get this movie out in time and we were in one room and then there was a wall and Randy's in the other room. One of the great thrilling moments is I heard him figuring out that theme...You could hear it through the wall as he was working out that theme and I'll never forget that."

The soundtrack album was released May 11, 1984 on the Warner Bros. label, with the logo for Tri-Star Pictures also appearing on the album to commemorate this as their first production.

== See also ==
- Bull Durham, a 1988 baseball film starring Kevin Costner
- Homer at the Bat, a 1992 episode from the third season of The Simpsons, extensively parodying The Natural
- The Unnatural, an episode of the television series The X-Files about an alien who played baseball. The episode title is a play on the novel and movie The Natural.
- Moneyball, a 2011 baseball film starring Brad Pitt
- List of baseball films
