= The Fixer (1968 film) =

British drama film by John Frankenheimer

- Directed by: John Frankenheimer
- Screenplay by: Dalton Trumbo
- Based on: The Fixer by Bernard Malamud
- Produced by: Edward Lewis Productions; John Frankenheimer Productions
- Starring: Alan Bates; Dirk Bogarde; Georgia Brown; Elizabeth Hartman
- Cinematography: Marcel Grignon
- Edited by: Henry Berman
- Music by: Maurice Jarre
- Distributed by: Metro-Goldwyn-Mayer
- Release date: 8 December 1968
- Running time: 132 minutes
- Country: United Kingdom
- Language: English

The Fixer is a 1968 British drama film directed by John Frankenheimer and starring Alan Bates, Dirk Bogarde, Elizabeth Hartman, David Warner and Georgia Brown. It was written by Dalton Trumbo based on Bernard Malamud's 1966 novel The Fixer, which was inspired by the 1913 trial of Menahem Mendel Beilis.

== Plot ==
In Kiev, Russian Jewish handyman Yakov Bok is falsely accused and imprisoned for the ritual murder of a Ukrainian boy named Andrei Yushchinsky, an example of the Blood Libel.

== Cast ==
- Alan Bates as Yakov Shepsovitch Bok
- Dirk Bogarde as Boris Bibikov, investigating magistrate
- Georgia Brown as Marfa Golov
- Hugh Griffith as Lebedev
- Elizabeth Hartman as Zinaida
- Ian Holm as I. N. Grubeshov
- David Opatoshu as Latke
- David Warner as Count Odoevsky
- Carol White as Raisl Bok
- George Murcell as Deputy Warden
- Murray Melvin as priest
- Peter Jeffrey as Berezhinsky
- Michael Goodliffe as Julius Ostrovsky
- Thomas Heathcote as Proshko
- Mike Pratt as Father Anastasy
- Stanley Meadows as Gronfein
- Francis de Wolff as warden
- David Lodge as Zhitnyak

== Critical reception ==
The Monthly Film Bulletin wrote: "Despite all the obvious effort and time that has been put into the production, it remains a protracted, and terribly dull, attempt at the 'serious' treatment of a literary subject – the kind of film in which one has to admire much of the acting simply because it is all there is to admire. ... Frankenheimer used a Hungarian crew to make The Fixer. It is just a pity that one of the first really ambitious attempts at East-West co-operation should turn out so limp."

Variety wrote: "The John Frankenheimer-Edward Lewis film adaptation of Bernard Malamud's The Fixer will need all of the prestige the novel acquired as the 1967 Pulitzer Prize winner to boost its box-office fortunes. Even so, it is doubtful that it will appeal to more than a limited audience, for the crushing violence and brutality is unrelieved in this drama of intolerance, which unfortunately comes off more as a preachment. ... Frankenheimer's direction attempts the gloomy mood of the overall subject and Marcel Grignon's color photography is outstanding, Bela Zeichan's art direction is interesting, particularly in the palace sequence, although this seems incongruous. Maurice Jarre's music score provides a fitful backing of the action."

The Radio Times Guide to Films gave the film 2/5 stars, writing: "This lumbering epic stars Alan Bates as a Jewish opportunist in tsarist Russia who claims to be a Gentile and insinuates his way into the management of a brick factory. There's a rape charge, imprisonment, humiliation and constant fear of exposure and a new wave of pogroms. Based on Bernard Malamud's novel, screenwriter Dalton Trumbo and director John Frankenheimer take on some mighty themes and turn them into a scaled-down Doctor Zhivago, complete with a tacky Maurice Jarre score. Tedious and turgid."

Leslie Halliwell wrote "Worthy but extremely dreary realist melodrama."

== Accolades ==
Alan Bates was nominated for an Academy Award for Best Actor in a Leading Role.
