= The Tenants (novel) =

1971 novel by Bernard Malamud

- First edition
- Author: Bernard Malamud
- Language: English
- Genre: Novel
- Publisher: Farrar, Straus and Giroux
- Publication date: Sept. 27, 1971
- Publication place: United States
- Media type: Print (hardcover)
- Pages: 252 pp
- ISBN: 0374521026
- OCLC: 175868
- Dewey Decimal: 813/.54
- LC Class: PS3563.A4
- Preceded by: Pictures of Fidelman (1969)
- Followed by: Rembrandt's Hat (1973)

The Tenants is the sixth novel of Bernard Malamud, published in 1971.

== Background ==
Malamud began the initial composition of the novel in 1969 and completed it in 1971. Its plot concerns a rivalry between two writers—one of them a Jew and the other an African-American— who are the last two persons remaining in a soon to be condemned apartment building. Before Malamud began writing this novel, he'd already "published two short stories treating relationships between blacks and Jews": "Angel Levine" (1955) and "Black Is My Favorite Color" (1963). And in at least one other story, "The Mourners" (1955), he had examined the fraught relationship between a tenant and a landlord. After he'd completed the novel, Malamud himself described The Tenants as a "tight, tense book, closer to the quality of short fiction."

When Malamud was asked, during an interview, what "set off" the writing of his novel, he replied: "Jews and blacks, the period of the troubles in New York City; the teachers strike, the rise of black activism, the mix-up of cause and effect. I thought I'd say a word." Malamud's biographer explains the genesis of the novel this way:

Malamud's imagination had been set going initially by a series of newspaper reports in January 1969 on New York slum landlords, seeking to get lingering tenants out of apartment properties which the landlords wished to sell off or tear down and convert into new office buildings. Essential water, heating, and elevator services were shut off; telephone threats were made.

== Book summary ==
A quick synopsis of the book's story was provided in the book jacket:

The sole tenant in a run-down tenement, Harry Lesser is struggling to finish a novel, but his solitary pursuit of the sublime grows complicated when Willie Spearmint, a black writer ambivalent toward Jews, moves into the building. Harry and Willie are artistic rivals and unwilling neighbors, and their uneasy peace is disturbed by the presence of Willie's white girlfriend, Irene, and the landlord Levenspiel's attempts to evict both men and demolish the building. This novel's conflict, current then, is perennial now: it reveals the slippery nature of the human condition, and the human capacity for violence and undoing.

As the story unfolds, all the building's residents have moved out with the exception of Lesser, who believes he's the sole remaining occupant and plans on staying until he completes his third novel. Lesser believes that it is crucial for him to remain in familiar surroundings so as not to break his writing routine. Then he hears the sound of a typewriter and soon discovers that it belongs to Willie Spearmint (who eventually adopts Bill Spear as a pen name) who has taken over one of the abandoned apartments as his writing space.

The time of the novel seems to be set in the final years of the 1960s, "a time of racial strife affecting both the book's Jewish and black characters." The novel's point of view is through Harry Lesser and "is rendered in third-person-limited narration."

== See also ==
- The Tenants, a 2005 film adaptation of the book
