= James Francis Tennant =

British astronomer and soldier

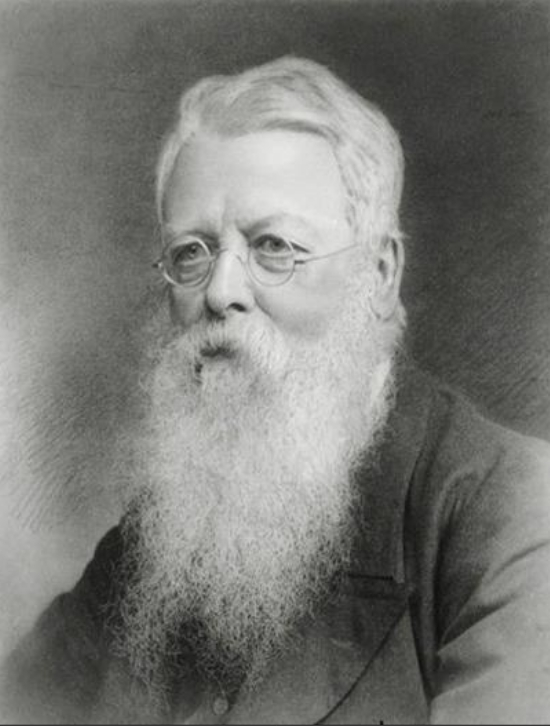
James Francis Tennant

Lieutenant-General James Francis Tennant, CIE, FRS (10 January 1829 – 6 March 1915) was a British soldier and astronomer.

Tennant was born in Calcutta to Scottish parents. The son of Brigadier-General Sir James Tennant and Elizabeth (née Paterson), and was educated at the East India Company's Military Seminary at Addiscombe from 1845 to 1847. He began his military career with the Bengal Engineers in Calcutta in 1847.

His mathematical skills landed him with the Great Trigonometric Survey where he was engaged in triangulation of the great longitudinal series until 1857, when he was diverted to garrison duties during the Indian Mutiny. In 1859, when he rejoined the survey, he was given the directorship of the Madras Observatory where his interest in astronomy started.

He was noted for being an observer for the Royal Astronomical Society for the solar eclipse of 17 August 1868 across the Indian peninsula, and that of 11 December 1871 across southern India, and later the transit of Venus of 1874. It was during these observations that photographic equipment was used extensively for the first time, Tennant was a practiced expert in photography and his skill aided the observations of the eclipses, in particular that of the solar corona.

In 1876 he was appointed Master of the Calcutta Mint, a position he held until his retirement in 1882, when he returned to England. He was elected to the council of the Royal Astronomical Society in 1885, and between 1890 and 1891 he served as president. At this time he had an interest in comets and contributed to several orbital calculations.
