= John Tennant =

John Tennant may refer to:

- John Tennant (bushranger), Australian bushranger
- John Tennant (footballer, born 1939) (1939–1985), English football goalkeeper
- John Tennant (RAF officer) (1890–1941), British airman, explorer, banker and politician
- John Tennant (major) (1899–1967), the son of Harold Tennant
- John Tennant (pastoralist)
- John Tennant (politician), British politician and MEP
- Jack Tennant (John William Tennant, 1907–1978), English football defender

== See also ==
- John Tennent (disambiguation)
