= The Fixer (novel) =

1966 novel by Bernard Malamud

- First edition
- Author: Bernard Malamud
- Language: English
- Genre: Historical fiction
- Publisher: Farrar, Straus & Giroux
- Publication date: 1966
- Publication place: United States
- Media type: Print
- Pages: 354
- ISBN: 1412812585
- Preceded by: Idiots First (1963)
- Followed by: Pictures of Fidelman (1969)

The Fixer is a 1966 novel by American writer Bernard Malamud. It won the 1967 National Book Award for Fiction, Malamud's second award, and the 1967 Pulitzer Prize for Fiction, despite not being set in the U.S or dealing with American life. The book is a fictionalized retelling of the Beilis Case: in 1913 Tsarist Russia, Jew Menahem Mendel Beilis is accused of murder and imprisoned. Beilis' trial caused an international uproar, and Beilis was acquitted by a jury.

The book was adapted into a 1968 film of the same name starring Alan Bates (Yakov Bok), who received an Oscar nomination.

== Plagiarism controversy ==
Descendants of Mendel Beilis have long argued that in writing The Fixer, Malamud plagiarized from the 1926 English edition of Beilis's memoir, The Story of My Sufferings. One of Beilis's sons made such claims in correspondence to Malamud when The Fixer was first published. A 2011 edition of Beilis's memoir, co-edited by one of his grandsons, claims to identify 35 instances of plagiarism by Malamud.

Responding to the plagiarism allegations, Malamud's biographer Philip Davis acknowledged "some close verbal parallels" between Beilis's memoir and Malamud's novel. Davis argued, however, "When it mattered most, [Malamud's] sentences offered a different dimension and a deeper emotion."

Jewish Studies scholar Michael Tritt has characterized the relationship between Malamud's The Fixer and Beilis's The Story of My Sufferings as one of "indebtedness and innovation".

== Censorship ==
The book was one of several removed from school libraries by the board of education of the Island Trees Union Free School District in New York, which was the subject of a U.S. Supreme Court case in 1982.

In 2022, a school district in South Carolina removed the book from its library because of a parental complaint lodged against dozens of books. In 2023, after a review, the book was returned to the library.

== In popular culture ==
In episode 7 of Mad Men Season 5, the character Don Draper is seen reading the novel in bed and recommending it to his wife Megan.

In Stephen King’s novel Doctor Sleep, the character Dan Torrance recommends the novel to Abra Stone.
