= Andrew Tennant =

Andrew Tennant may refer to:

- Andrew Tennant (pastoralist) (1835–1913), Scottish-born Australian pastoralist, businessman and politician
- Andy Tennant (born 1955), film director
- Andy Tennant (cricketer) (born 1966), Scottish cricketer, former coach of the Scottish national side
- Andy Tennant (cyclist) (born 1987), English professional track and road racing cyclist
