= Pictures of Fidelman =

1969 novel by Bernard Malamud

- First edition cover
- Author: Bernard Malamud
- Cover artist: Catherine Smolich
- Language: English
- Publisher: Farrar, Straus and Giroux
- Publication date: 1969
- Publication place: United States
- Media type: Print
- Pages: 208 pp
- ISBN: 0-374-23248-2
- Preceded by: The Fixer (1966)
- Followed by: The Tenants (1971)

Pictures of Fidelman: An Exhibition is the fifth published novel of Bernard Malamud. It is a novel in the form of a short story cycle, which gathers six stories dealing with Arthur Fidelman, an art student from the Bronx who travels to Italy, initially to research Giotto, but also with the hopes of becoming a painter. It was published in 1969 and includes stories from Malamud's earlier collections The Magic Barrel (1958) and Idiots First (1963), plus two previously uncollected stories and one previously unpublished story.

== Background ==
The novel consists of six linked stories. As Malamud's official biographer, Philip Davis, points out: "The first three of the six stories in Fidelman had been published previously: "The Last Mohican" in The Magic Barrel (1958), and "Still Life" and "Naked Nude" in Idiots First (1963); "A Pimp’s Revenge" was published in Playboy and "Pictures of the Artist" in The Atlantic Monthly, both in 1968.

Malamud had already published two collections of short stories by the time he gathered these stories together for a book. But his intention here was not to publish a third short story collection:

"Malamud insisted nonetheless that from the second story onwards he had intended it to be a separate book—but a looser work, written occasionally, to make a picaresque comedy freed of the pressures of a continuous life or single-minded career. Malamud particularly liked [a] Robert Scholes piece in Saturday Review of 10 May 1969, where the stories were described as ‘six comic Stations of the Cross’. As Malamud told his audience in some notes for a reading: ‘At first I thought they could be unrelated stories, each vertical, no horizontal bonds, but soon I conceived the content of the last story of the series and before long the thrust was diagonal as well as vertical."

== The Stories ==
Aside from Arthur Fidelman, the only character that appears in more than one story is Bessie, his sister, a mother of five living in Levittown, who occasionally sends him money. Bessie also loaned Fidelman her "bulky, two-strapped affair" suitcase for his Italian adventure (11).

=== "The Last Mohican" ===
This story was published in the Spring 1958 Partisan Review and later included in Malamud's first short story collection The Magic Barrel. Fidelman arrives in Rome wide-eyed with wonder ("a Bronx boy walking around in all this history") as he sets off to complete a book about the works of Giotto. He repeatedly runs into the eccentric peddler Shimon Susskind, who asks many questions about Fidelman's academic interests and offers to guide Fidelman through Rome's museums. Fidelman, an art history expert, declines but learns that Susskind is a Holocaust survivor who fled through Germany, Poland, and Hungary to Israel, before moving to Rome. Fidelman at first gives him some money but Susskind keeps insisting that Fidelman give him his old back-up suit, since Fidelman is wearing a nice new one. Fidelman keeps refusing, and even moves hotels so that Susskind can't find him. However, Susskind manages to steal the transcript of the first chapter of Fidelman's book. Consumed with anguish and anxiety, Fidelman spends three months in Rome looking for Susskind, who cannot be found now despite having constantly run into him before the theft. Finally, Fidelman decides to go see Giotto's Navicella at St. Peter's Basilica, and finds Susskind there selling rosaries to Christian tourists. Fidelman follows Susskind back to his tiny apartment in Rome's Jewish Ghetto, but it turns out that Susskind has burned the draft of Fidelman's book. Fidelman is furious and threatens to kill Susskind, but Susskind insists that he did Fidelman a favor. Fidelman realizes that Susskind stole his transcript to review it, and that upon doing so Susskind hid at the Navicella so that Fidelman wouldn't leave Rome without seeing a piece of art that would completely change his thesis. Fidelman tries to forgive Susskind and give him the old suit he had originally requested, but Susskind has disappeared into the ghetto's winding alleys.

=== "Still Life" ===
First published in the Winter 1962 Partisan Review and later included in Idiots First; Fidelman moves into a studio with Annamaria Oliovino, whom he is attracted to though she repeatedly mistreats him. To keep warm in his pittrice's drafty loft, Fidelman wears "a new thick sweater Bessie had knitted for him" (60).

=== "Naked Nude" ===
First published in the August 1963 Playboy and later included in Idiots First; Fidelman finds himself working as a toilet-scrubber in a whorehouse, at the mercy of Scarpio and Angelo, who convince him to forge Titian's Venus of Urbino in exchange for his freedom. Passing reference is made to Susskind from the opening story:

"'Who's that hanging?' Scarpio points to a long-coated figure loosely dangling from a gallows rope among Fidelman's other doodles.
Who but Susskind, surely. A dim figure out of the past.
'Just a friend. Nobody you know'" (69-70).

Later, reference is made to two women in Fidelman's past, providing the stories continuity:

"He is at the same time choked by remembered lust for all the women he had ever desired, from Bessie to Annamaria Oliovino, and for their garters, underpants, slips or half-slips, brassieres and stockings" (85).

=== "A Pimp's Revenge" ===
Previously uncollected story published in the February 1968 issue of Playboy. Fidelman, now living in Florence, Italy, tries to complete a painting that has tormented him for years, of himself and his mother, and though he finally manages to create a masterpiece, it does not convey what he had hoped it would. Esmeralda, an 18-year-old prostitute, moves in with Fidelman, becoming his housekeeper, cook, bedmate, and muse. Ludovico Belvedere, a failed artist and erstwhile Esmeralda's pimp, is a recurring thorn in the side to Fidelman and Esmeralda, especially after financial pressures force the girl to return to her dishonorable profession with Fidelman serving as her pimp.

Malamud deftly weaves continuity into his story, referencing characters from earlier stories, as in this passage describing the face of his mother that he continually paints only to scrape off in vexation:

"I've made her old and young, and sometimes resembling Annamaria Oliovino, or Teresa, the chambermaid in Milan; even a little like Susskind, when my memory gets mixed up, who was a man I met when I first came to Rome" (107-08).

Annamaria Oliovino appeared in "Still Life," Teresa in "Naked Nude," and Susskind in "Last Mohican." Fidelman's sister Bessie is also mentioned throughout the story.

=== "Pictures of the Artist" ===
Previously uncollected story published by The Atlantic Monthly in December 1968. Fidelman's stream-of-consciousness, heavy with quotations, revealing his thoughts about life, art, and truth.

=== "Glass Blower of Venice" ===
Previously unpublished story, so this marked its first appearance in print. Fidelman learns about love and glass blowing, and finally returns to America.

== Reception ==
When the book came out Anatole Broyard of The New York Times compared it unfavorably to Malamud's previous book, The Assistant:

What [Malamud] has done in Pictures of Fidelman is to reverse the principle of his most successful book, The Assistant. There he thrust an Italian, Frank Alpine, into the thick texture of Jewish life, where he functioned as a kind of perspective by incongruity, a green pepper in the chicken fat. Now Fidelman, a "Classical" Jew from the Bronx, is put down in Italy presumably for the same purpose.
But where Alpine learned the nobility of suffering from the Jew, Fidelman learns, as far as one can discover, nothing but pimping, glass blowing and sodomy from the Italians. And perhaps it is this poor return for his years of expatriation that robs Pictures of Fidelman of the moral breadth, the grand lugubriousness, that distinguishes Malamud's best stories.

Broyard concludes that "Malamud is too talented a writer not to make this book a joy in many of its details. But there are too many unanswered questions, too many glib capitulations to the modern canon, which absolves the author of all responsibility for his stories."

== Critical views of the book ==
Malamud is held in high regard as a fiction writer, and Pictures of Fidelman has taken its place in the critical assessment of Malamud's career.

Rosebud Ben-Oni's 2015 article "On Failure and Redemption: Bernard Malamud's 'Pictures of Fidelman'" (The Kenyon Review) notes the uneasy reception the book had with its initial reviewers. Several compared it unfavorably to his earlier work, and were uncomfortable with the ending, in which Fidelman has an liberating relationship with an Italian man, and returns to America as a bisexual ("In America he worked as a craftsman in glass and loved men and women.") Ben-Oni says Fidelman learns the following in Italy: "to live compassionately is the greatest art of all."
