= John Tennent (cricketer) =

Australian cricketer

Personal information
- Born: 31 July 1846; Hobart, Australia
- Died: 31 October 1893 (aged 47); Clifton Hill, Victoria, Australia

Domestic team information
- Years: Team
- 1877-1880: Victoria
- Source: Cricinfo, 21 July 2015

John Tennent (31 July 1846 – 31 October 1893) was an Australian cricketer. He played two first-class cricket matches for Victoria between 1877 and 1880.

== See also ==
- List of Victoria first-class cricketers
