= Alan Tennant =

English rugby league footballer (1930-1997)

Personal information
- Full name: Alan Tennant
- Born: 30 September 1930
- Died: 20 February 1997 (aged 66) St James's University Hospital, Leeds, England

Playing information
- Position: Centre
Club
Years	Team	Pld	T	G	FG	P
1948–59	Featherstone Rovers	214	41	0	0	123
- Relatives: Walter Tennant (brother)

Alan Tennant (30 September 1930 – 20 February 1997) was an English professional rugby league footballer who played in the 1940s and 1950s. He played at club level for Featherstone Rovers, as a centre.

== Playing career ==
Tennant made his début for Featherstone Rovers against Dewsbury at Crown Flatt, Dewsbury on Saturday 25 December 1948, and he played his last match for Featherstone Rovers against Huddersfield during December 1959.

=== Challenge Cup Final appearances ===
Tennant played at centre in Featherstone Rovers' 12-18 defeat by Workington Town in the 1952 Challenge Cup Final during the 1951–52 season at Wembley Stadium, London on Saturday 19 April 1952, in front of a crowd of 72,093.

=== Testimonial match ===
Tennant's benefit season at Featherstone Rovers took place during the 1958–59 season.
