= A New Life (novel) =

1961 novel by Bernard Malamud

- First edition
- Author: Bernard Malamud
- Cover artist: Milton Glaser
- Language: English
- Publisher: Farrar, Straus and Cudahy
- Publication date: 1961
- Publication place: United States
- Media type: Print (hardcover)
- Pages: 367 pp
- ISBN: 978-0374221287
- LC Class: PS3563.A4 N4
- Preceded by: The Magic Barrel (1958)
- Followed by: Idiots First (1963)

A New Life is a semi-autobiographical campus novel by Bernard Malamud first published in 1961. It is Malamud's third published novel.
