= Walter Tennant =

English rugby league footballer

Walt Tennant
Personal information
- Full name: Walter Tennant
- Born: 1 January 1921 Pontefract district, England
- Died: 2000 (aged 79)

Playing information
- Position: Centre
Club
Years	Team	Pld	T	G	FG	P
1939–51	Featherstone Rovers	48	2	1	0	8
1941–46	Wakefield Trinity	7	5	0	0	15
	Total	55	7	1	0	23
Representative
Years	Team	Pld	T	G	FG	P
1949	Yorkshire	1
- Relatives: Alan Tennant (brother)

Walter "Walt" Tennant (1 January 1921 – 2000) was an English professional rugby league footballer who played in the 1930s, 1940s and 1950s. He played at representative level for Yorkshire, and at club level for Featherstone Rovers and Wakefield Trinity, as a centre.

== Background ==
Tennant's birth was registered in Pontefract district, West Riding of Yorkshire, England his death details are unknown.

== Playing career ==
Tennant made his début for Featherstone Rovers on Wednesday 30 August 1939.

=== County honours ===
Tennant won a cap for Yorkshire while at Featherstone Rovers; during the 1949–50 season against Cumberland.

=== County Cup Final appearances ===
Tennant played at centre in Featherstone Rovers' 12-9 victory over Wakefield Trinity in the 1939–40 Yorkshire Cup Final during the 1939–40 season at Odsal Stadium, Bradford on Saturday 22 June 1940.

=== Testimonial match ===
Tennant's benefit season at Featherstone Rovers took place during the 1950–51 season.
