= The Natural =

Novel by Bernard Malamud

- Cover page of The Natural (first edition)
- Author: Bernard Malamud
- Cover artist: Simon Goltche
- Language: English
- Publisher: Harcourt Brace and Company
- Publication date: August 21, 1952
- Publication place: United States
- Media type: Print (hardback & paperback)
- OCLC: 11868356
- Followed by: The Assistant (1957)

The Natural is a 1952 novel about baseball by Bernard Malamud, and is his debut novel. The story follows Roy Hobbs, a baseball prodigy whose career is sidetracked after he is shot by a woman whose motivation remains mysterious. The story mostly concerns his attempts to return to baseball later in life, when he plays for the fictional New York Knights with the bat he made, "Wonderboy."

Some observers have taken the Hobbs character to have been modeled on the Philadelphia Phillies player Eddie Waitkus, called "the natural" in his early years in the sport, for Waitkus was shot, just as Hobbs is in the book, in a Chicago hotel room by an obsessed woman whom he didn't know. Others suggest Malamud may have found inspiration in the shooting of the Chicago Cubs shortstop Billy Jurges, likewise in a Chicago hotel room, by a showgirl with whom he was romantically linked. However, Malamud isn't known to have cited either story when discussing his influences for The Natural, instead telling of professional baseball players who were his childhood heroes in New York: "I wrote The Natural as a tale of a mythological hero… [I] tried to use [mythology] to symbolize and explicate an ethical dilemma of American life.”

A film adaptation of the same name starring Robert Redford as Roy Hobbs was released in 1984. In contrast to the book, the film ends victoriously.

== Plot ==
Nineteen-year-old Roy Hobbs is traveling by train to Chicago with his manager Sam to try out for the Chicago Cubs. Other passengers include sportswriter Max Mercy; Walter "The Whammer" Whambold, the leading hitter in the American League and three-time American League Most Valuable Player (based on Babe Ruth); and Harriet Bird, a beautiful and mysterious woman. The train stops at a carnival along the rail where The Whammer challenges Hobbs to strike him out, which he does. Back on the train, Harriet Bird strikes up a conversation with Hobbs. In fact, she is a lunatic obsessed with shooting the best baseball player.

In Chicago, Hobbs checks into his hotel and receives a call from Bird, who is also staying there. When he goes to her room, she shoots him in the stomach.

The novel picks up 16 years later in the dugout of the New York Knights, a National League baseball team. The team has been on a losing streak, and manager Pop Fisher's and assistant manager Red Blow's careers appear to be winding to an ignominious end. During one losing game, Roy Hobbs announces that he is the team's new right fielder, having just been signed by Knights co-owner Judge Banner. Pop and Red take Hobbs under their wing, and Red tells Hobbs about Fisher's plight as manager of the Knights. The Judge wants to take over Pop's share in the team but cannot until the season ends, provided the Knights fail to win the National League pennant.

Roy has practical jokes played upon him, including the theft of his "Wonderboy" bat. Once he gets his first chance at the plate, however, he proves to be a "natural" at the game. During one game, Pop substitutes Hobbs as a pinch hitter for team star Bump Bailey, intending to teach Bailey a lesson for not hustling. A few days later, a newly hustling Bump attempts to play a fly ball. He runs into the outfield wall, later dying from the impact. Roy takes over Bump's position.

Max Mercy reappears, searching for details of Hobbs' past. At the same time, Hobbs has been attempting to negotiate a higher salary with the judge. Mercy introduces Hobbs to bookie Gus Sands, who is keeping company with Memo Paris, Pop's niece. Hobbs has been infatuated with Memo, and his magic tricks appear to impress her.

Max Mercy writes a column about the judge's refusal to grant Hobbs a raise, and a fan uprising ensues. Pop warns Hobbs about Memo, saying she imparts bad luck on the people she associates with. Hobbs dismisses the warning and falls into a hitting slump. He finally hits a home run during a game where a mysterious woman rises from her seat. Her name is Iris Lemon, and Roy courts her. However, upon learning she is a grandmother at age 33, he loses interest and returns his attention to Memo Paris.

Memo rebuffs Roy's advances; he leads the Knights to a 17-game winning streak. With the Knights one game from winning the National League pennant, Roy attends a party hosted by Memo. He collapses there and awakens in the hospital. The doctor says he can play in the final game of the season but must retire after that if he wants to live.

The judge offers Hobbs a bribe to lose the Knights’ final game. That night, he reads a letter from Iris. After seeing the word "grandmother" in the letter, he discards it. He plays the next day and fouls a pitch into the stands that injures Iris and splits the Wonderboy bat. Iris tells Roy that she is pregnant with his child, and now he is determined to do his best for their future. At the end of the game, Hobbs comes to bat against Herman Youngberry, a brilliant young pitcher similar to Hobbs at the same age. Youngberry strikes out Hobbs, ending the season for the Knights. As Hobbs sits bemoaning the end of the season and possibly his career, Mercy finds out that he was paid to throw the game. If this report is true, Roy will be expelled from the game and all of his records removed.

== Major characters ==
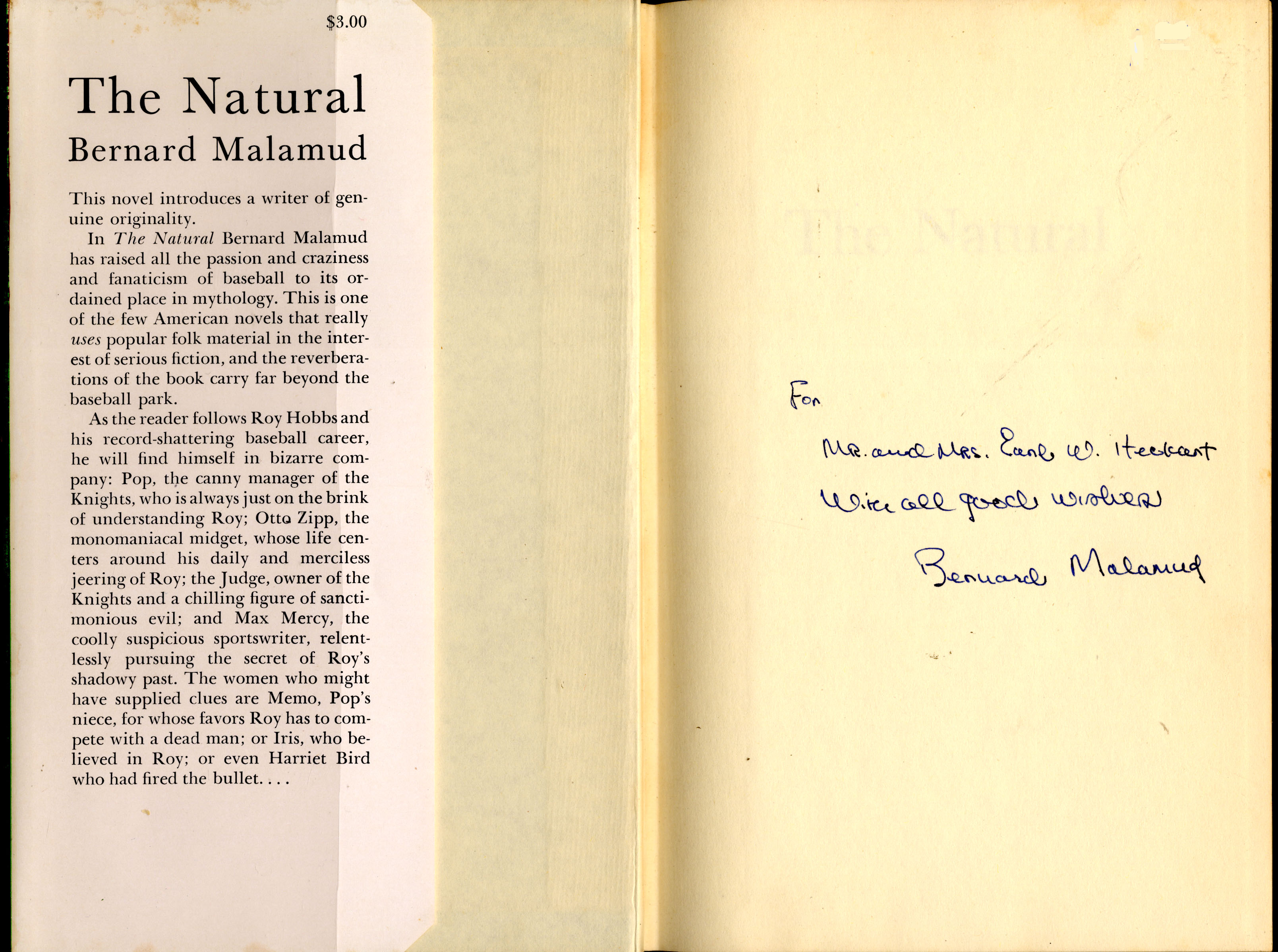
A signed first edition copy of The Natural held by Oregon State University, which employed Malamud.

- Roy Hobbs – "The Natural" – A former teenage pitching phenomenon whose career dreams were derailed after a mysterious woman shot and seriously wounded him as he travelled to Chicago to try out for a Major League baseball team. The story revolves around Hobbs's quest to make a comeback years after the tragedy and, hopefully, finally to take his rightful place on the field and be remembered as one of the greatest ballplayers of all time.
- Memo Paris – Roy's main love interest throughout the story, Memo is Pop Fisher's niece and is often in the company of Sands. She is generally unhappy and leads Roy on for most of the novel.
- Pop Fisher – The grizzled manager of the New York Knights, Pop was once a fine player who is remembered for making a crucial error in his playing career and for never winning the big game. His name and situation are suggestive of the Fisher King of legend.
- Max Mercy – A seedy journalist who is more concerned with unearthing facts about the players' personal lives than covering the sport itself. Mercy meets Hobbs in the beginning of the novel and later spends most of his time trying to uncover his dark secrets.
- Gus Sands – A morally bankrupt bookie who enjoys placing bets against Hobbs until he persuades him to take a dive in the final game. He is also always around Memo, despite Roy's protests.
- Iris Lemon – A fan of Roy's who helps him break his slump in the middle of the season. Iris makes a deep connection with Roy, although he favors Memo over her until the end of the novel.
- Harriet Bird – The mysterious woman the teen-aged Roy meets on the train when he is en route to Chicago at the beginning of the novel. She later shoots him in her hotel room before committing suicide. Her character is loosely based on Ruth Ann Steinhagen, a disturbed 19-year-old baseball fan who, obsessed with Eddie Waitkus, shot and nearly killed him in 1949.
