= Henry Tennant =

Henry Tennant may refer to:

- Henry Tennant (railway administrator) (1823–1910), British railway administrator
- Henry Tennant (Canadian politician) (1839–?), political figure in Manitoba
- Henry Tennant (MP), MP for Hastings
