= James Tennant (East India Company officer) =

Army officer in the East India Company

Sir James Tennant KCB
- Born: 21 April 1789; Ayr, Scotland
- Died: 6 March 1854 (aged 64–65); Mian Mir, India
- Spouse: Elizabeth Pattenson (m.)
- Children: James Francis Tennant
- Military career
- Allegiance: East India Company
- Branch: Bengal Army; Army of the Punjab
- Service years: 1805–1852
- Rank: Brigadier-general
- Conflicts: Third Anglo-Maratha War; Second Anglo-Sikh War
- Awards: Punjab Medal

Brigadier-general Sir James Tennant KCB (21 April 1789 – 6 March 1854), colonel commandant of the Bengal Artillery, was a British army officer in the service of the East India Company.

== Life ==
=== England and the Cape ===
James Tennant, the second son of William Tennant, merchant of Ayr, and of his wife, the daughter of William Dalrymple, was born on 21 April 1789. He was educated at the military school at Great Marlow, and sailed as cadet of the East India Company on 31 August 1805 in the East India fleet which accompanied the expedition of Sir David Baird and Sir Home Popham to the Cape of Good Hope. The East India Company cadets and recruits under Lieutenant-colonel Wellesley of the Bengal establishment took part in the operations by which Cape Town was captured, and were usefully employed in different branches of the service. (Note: Despatch of Sir David Baird, 12 January 1806.)

=== India ===
Tennant arrived in India on 21 Aug. 1806, and received a commission as lieutenant in the Bengal artillery antedated to 29 March for his service at the Cape. In 1810 he commanded a detachment of artillery on service on the "vizier's dominions". On 1 January 1812 he was appointed acting adjutant and quartermaster to Major G. Fuller's detachment of artillery, and on 15 January marched from Bauda with the force under Colonel Gabriel Martindell to the attack of Kalinjar, a formidable fort on a large isolated hill nine hundred feet above the surrounding level. Kalinjar was reached on 19 January; by the 28th the batteries opened, and on 2 February the breaches being practicable, an unsuccessful attempt was made to storm. On 3 February the place capitulated, and was taken possession of on the 8th. The governor-general noticed in general orders the distinguished part taken by the artillery on 2 February. Tennant was employed throughout this and the following year in various minor operations in the districts bordering on Bandelkhand.

On 27 December 1814, with two 18-pounder guns and four mountain pieces of the 3rd division, he joined Sir David Ochterlony at Nahr, on the north-north-east side of the Ramgarh ridge, to take part in the operations against Nipal. In March 1815 Tennant ascended the Ramgarh ridge, with the force under Lieutenant-colonel Cooper, and, bringing up his 18-pounders with incredible labour, opened upon Ramgarh, which soon surrendered, Jorjori capitulating at the same time. Taragarh (11 March) and Chamha (16th) were reached and taken. All the posts on this ridge having been successively reduced, the detachment took up the position assigned to it before Malown on 1 April. Malown was captured by assault on 15 April before the 18-pounders, which were dragged by hand over the hills at the rate of one or two miles a day, had arrived; these guns were eventually left in the fort.

==== Third Anglo-Maratha War ====
Tennant was promoted to be second captain in the regiment and captain in the army on 1 October 1816, and first captain in the Bengal artillery on 1 September 1818. His next active service was in the Pindari and Maratha war of 1817 to 1819. He joined the centre division under Major-general T. Brown of the Marquess of Hastings's grand army at Sikandra in the Cawnpore district, but moving forward to Mahewas on the river Sindh in November 1817, it was attacked by cholera. He took part in some of the operations of this war, as captain and brigade-major of the second division of artillery, and received a share of the Dakhan prize-money for general captures. He held the appointment of brigade-major of artillery in the field in 1819 and 1820. He was selected to command the artillery at Agra on 23 December 1823, and on the 31st of the month he was nominated first assistant secretary to the military board.

==== Siege of Bharatpur ====
On 28 May 1824 Tennant was appointed assistant adjutant-general of artillery. In November 1825 he accompanied the commandant of artillery, Brigadier-general Alexander Macleod, to Agra, where and at Muttra the commander-in-chief, Lord Combermere, assembled his army for the Siege of Bharatpur. The siege began in the middle of December; on the 24th the batteries opened fire, breaches were found practicable on 18 January 1826, and this formidable place was carried by assault. Tennant, who, as assistant adjutant-general of artillery, had the management of all details connected with the artillery generally, was thanked by the commandant in regimental orders (21 January 1826) for the assistance he had rendered. Tennant's "methodical habits and mathematical talent rendered labour easy to him which would have been difficult to others". In February he accompanied Combermere to Cawnpore and to the presidency.

==== Promotions ====
Tennant was promoted to be major on 3 March 1831. He was appointed to officiate as agent for the manufacture of gunpowder at Ishapur on 28 April 1835, and being confirmed in that appointment on 28 July, he ceased to be assistant adjutant-general of artillery. On 11 April 1836 he became a member of the special committee of artillery officers. (Note: see Stubbs, History of the Bengal Artillery, iii. 579.) The minutes drawn up on various subjects by members of the board, when there was any difference of opinion, are both interesting and valuable. One by Tennant on the calibre of guns for horse and field artillery, and on the substitution in the latter of horse for bullock draught, is particularly so. He was promoted to be lieutenant-colonel on 18 January 1837, and in consequence vacated the agency for gunpowder.

For his services on the committee of artillery officers he received the approbation and thanks of the government of India. On 21 March 1837 he was posted to the command of the 4th battalion of artillery. On 28 November 1842 he was given the command of the Cawnpore division of artillery, and in the following year was specially mentioned for the superior state of discipline and equipment of his command. On 17 November 1843 he was appointed to command, with the rank of brigadier-general, the foot artillery attached to the army of exercise assembled at Agra under Sir Hugh (afterwards Lord) Gough. This force left Agra for the Gwalior campaign on 16 December, crossing the river Chambal on the 21st. In spite of great exertions, Tennant and the heavy ordnance got considerably behind. Gough did not wait for his heavy guns, and the Battle of Maharajpur (29 December) was rather riskily fought without them. (Note: cf. Gough's despatch ap. London Gazette, 8 March 1844.)

On 10 February 1844 Tennant was again appointed to be commandant of the artillery at Cawnpore. On 3 July 1845 he was promoted to be colonel in the army, and was sent on special duty to inspect and report on field magazines of the upper provinces. He, however, resigned this appointment, to the regret of the government, and resumed his command at Cawnpore. In 1846–7 Tennant was associated with Colonel George Brooke of the Bengal artillery, on a committee at Simla, on the equipment of mountain batteries. The experience of both, drawn from the Nipal war, 1814–16, produced valuable minutes.

==== Second Anglo-Sikh War ====
On 2 September 1848 Tennant was appointed brigadier-general to command the Maiwar field force. He was then attached to the army of the Punjab to command the artillery with the rank of brigadier-general. He commanded this arm at the Battle of Chillianwala on 13 January 1849, and was mentioned in despatches. (Note: London Gazette, 3 and 23 March 1849.) He also commanded it at the Battle of Gujrat on 21 February 1849, and was again mentioned in despatches. (Note: London Gazette, 19 April 1849.) He received the thanks of both houses of parliament, of the government of India, and of the court of directors of the East India Company. (Note: General order, 7 June 1849.) He was made a Companion of the Bath on 5 June 1849, and received the war medal and clasp.

On 13 March 1849 Tennant resumed his appointment at Cawnpore, and on 19 December was transferred to Lahore as brigadier-general commanding. On 30 January 1852 he was given the command of the Cis-Jhilam division of the army. He was made a Knight Commander of the Bath on 8 October 1852.

=== Legacy ===
Tennant died at Mian Mir on 6 March 1854. He married Elizabeth, a daughter of Charles Pattenson of the Bengal civil service. Lieutenant-general James Francis Tennant, CIE, FRS, of the Royal Engineers, was his son. Tennant's attainments were of a very high order, and "he was better acquainted with the details of his profession than perhaps any officer in the regiment". (Note: Stubbs.)

== Sources ==
- India Office Records;
- Despatches;
- Stubbs's History of the Bengal Artillery, 1st and 2nd vols. 1877, 3rd vol. 1895;
- Life of Sir David Baird, 2 vols. 1832;
- Ross of Bladensburg's Marquess of Hastings (Rulers of India);
- East India Military Cal.;
- Thornton's History of India;
- Prinsep's History of the Political and Military Transactions in India during the Administration of the Marquess of Hastings, 2 vols. 1825;
- Grant Duff's History of the Mahratas, 1826;
- Blacker's Memoir of Operations of British Army in India during the Mahrata War of 1817–19–21;
- Journal of Artillery Operations before Bhurtpore in East India United Service Journal, vol. ii.;
- Creighton's Narrative of the Siege and Capture of Bhurtpore, 1830;
- Seaton's From Cadet to Colonel, 1866;
- Thackwell's Second Sikh War.

== Bibliography ==
- Vetch, Robert Hamilton (1898). "Tennant, James (1789-1854)" . In Lee, Sidney (ed.). Dictionary of National Biography. Vol. 56. London: Smith, Elder & Co. pp. 61–62.
