= The Jewbird =

Short story by Bernard Malamud

- Short story by Bernard Malamud
- Country: USA
- Language: English
- Genre: Fantasy short story

Publication
- Published in: The Reporter; April 11, 1963; Idiots First
- Publication type: Magazine; Short Story Collection
- Publisher: Straus and Company
- Media type: Print (Paperback)

"The Jewbird" is a short story by the Jewish-American writer Bernard Malamud. The protagonist is a crow named Schwartz, who identifies himself as a Jewbird. Fleeing persecution by antisemitic birds, Schwartz tries to find a home with a New York City Jewish family. Despite being generous and respectful to the family, the father first persecutes, and then attempts to kill Schwartz. The story has been interpreted as an allegory about Jewish self-hatred.

The story was first published in The Reporter on April 11, 1963, and collected in Idiots First (1963). It also appeared in A Malamud Reader (1967), The Stories of Bernard Malamud (1983), and Two Fables (1978), where it appeared along with "Talking Horse." The story was adapted for the stage at the Israeli Gesher Theater, along with other tales, under the title Schwartz and Other Animals.
