= God's Grace =

1982 novel by Bernard Malamud

- First edition
- Author: Bernard Malamud
- Language: English
- Genre: Post-apocalyptic fiction
- Publisher: Farrar, Straus and Giroux
- Publication date: 1982
- Publication place: United States
- Media type: Print (hardback & paperback)
- ISBN: 0-380-64519-X
- LC Class: 82-11880
- Preceded by: Dubin's Lives
- Followed by: The Stories of Bernard Malamud (1983)

God's Grace is the eighth and final novel written by American author Bernard Malamud, published in 1982 by Farrar, Straus and Giroux. The novel focuses on Calvin Cohn, the supposed sole survivor of thermonuclear war and God's second Flood, who attempts to rebuild and perfect civilization amongst the primates that make their way onto a tropical island.

== Plot ==
The book is divided into six parts, The Flood, Cohn's Island, The Schooltree, The Virgin in the Trees, The Voice of the Prophet and God's Mercy.

== Characters ==
=== Main characters ===
- Calvin Cohn – the novel's protagonist. Born Seymour Cohn to Jewish parents, including a cantor/rabbi, he changed his name when he gave up the path to clergyship in order to pursue science. Cohn surfaces after a deep-sea excavation to discover that it is the end of the world, and is informed by God that his survival is an inconsequential, "minuscule error."
- Buz (originally named Gottlob) – Cohn's chimpanzee companion and adopted son. Cohn finds him stowed away on the vessel shortly after the deluge, and the two bond out of necessity. Buz gains the ability to speak after Cohn discovers a mechanical apparatus surgically embedded in his throat, put there by the ape's previous owner, Dr. Bünder. Because of the doctor's influence, Buz expresses many Christian ideas and values, causing minor conflict between the two.
- God – one of the novel's antagonists. God is depicted as wrathful and explicitly nonanthromorphic. After the war begins humanity's destruction, God floods the world, removing all animal and bacterial life, though flora remains. Cohn reflects on Him often, but God only makes appearances when the man has openly blasphemed or offended Him.

=== Chimpanzees ===
Two groups of chimpanzees arrive on Cohn's Island at separate points.

- Group One:

- Esau – arrogant, self-proclaimed "alpha-ape." Though Cohn tries to mediate the ape, he is constantly in conflict with Cohn, Buz, or both.
- Mary Madelyn – a inhibited, intelligent ape with more "human" ideals than her peers. Being the only young female, she is constantly the subject of sexual advances.
- Melchior – an old, tired ape who is highly respected by the others. When Esau fails, Melchior assumes his role as leader.
- Luke, and Saul of Tarsus – juvenile twin apes. They are slow to speech, mischievous, and highly influenced by Esau.

- Group Two:

- Hattie, Esterhazy, Bromberg

=== Others ===
- George – a formidable, yet peaceful and pensive gorilla that takes residence on Cohn's island. Though he cannot speak (which causes him immense frustration), he expresses a strong interest in cantorial music and in knowledge, attending Cohn's lectures and contemplating. His stature, silence and genetic differences cause him to be a pariah amongst the chimpanzees who react either in panic or detestment at the sight of him, despite Cohn's diplomatic attempts.
- The baboons – eight baboons appear inexplicably on the island. They are incapable of speech, and seem uninterested in learning, so they remain outside of the society.
- Rebekah Islanda – the offspring of Cohn and Mary Madelyn. Cohn believes that the hybrid child can head the new civilization.
- Dr. Bünder – a scientist who abandoned ship, Cohn and Buz with it, when the Devastation happened. Though he does not appear in the story, Dr Bünder has a large impact upon Buz, from his Christian beliefs and his bionic ability to speak, to his moderate German accent.

== Critical reception ==
God's Grace has not received the same critical acclaim as have some of his previous works. Many have noted that it is much more dramatic than earlier writings. John Leonard, a reviewer for the New York Times wrote that the book, "[it] groans under the weight of its many meanings." Another New York Times writer called it "charming and foolish, topical and farfetched, provocative and innocent," also noting that its meaning and symbolism were direct and cumbersome.
