= Dubin's Lives =

1979 novel by Bernard Malamud

- First edition cover
- Author: Bernard Malamud
- Cover artist: Honi Werner
- Language: English
- Publisher: Farrar, Straus and Giroux
- Publication date: 1979
- Publication place: United States
- Media type: Print
- Pages: 362 pp
- ISBN: 0-374-14414-1
- Preceded by: Rembrandt's Hat (1973)
- Followed by: God's Grace (1982)

Dubin's Lives is the seventh published novel by the American writer Bernard Malamud. The title character is a biographer working on a life of D. H. Lawrence. It first appeared in hardcover from the publisher Farrar, Straus and Giroux in 1979. Portions of the novel originally appeared, in somewhat different form, in The New Yorker, The Atlantic, and Playboy. It is still in print, Farrar, Straus and Giroux having reissued a paperback edition in 2003 with an Introduction by Thomas Mallon.

== Background ==
Malamud began writing the novel in February 1973, and he completed it in August 1978. Parts of the novel were first published in The New Yorker and Playboy.

== Epigraphs ==
The novel begins with two quotations.

What demon possessed me that I behaved so well? – Thoreau

Give me continence and chastity, but not yet. — Augustine of Hippo

The first epigraph points to the notion that Dubin has written a biography of Thoreau and also alerts the reader to the moral complexities that the novel explores. The second connects the novel with themes of promiscuity and spiritual struggle for which Augustine is famous.

== Plot summary ==
William Dubin of Vermont is living the comfortable life of an accomplished writer. Though his marriage to Kitty is slightly timeworn, it is stable and loving. While researching the biography of D. H. Lawrence, he meets twenty-three-year-old Fanny and begins an affair with her. Predictably, the consequences of this act rock Dubin's life and invite the reader to draw parallels with similar events in the lives of the writers Dubin is researching.

== Reception ==
Over the years, Dubin's Lives has been well-received, and has consistently garnered attention and sales since it was published. As of 2017, the novel is still in print.

Upon its publication, initial reviews were enthusiastic. Christopher Lehmann-Haupt of The New York Times concluded that it was "certainly Malamud’s best novel since The Assistant,"; and that maybe it was "the best he has written of all."
