= The Mourners =

Bernard Malamud’s short story "The Mourners” first appeared in Discovery in January 1955. The story was included in Malamud's first collection of short stories, The Magic Barrel, published in 1958.

== Plot summary ==
Kessler used to be an egg candler, and is living alone in a cheap apartment located on the top floor of a decrepit tenement building on the East Side of New York City. He'd had a family but he outgrew them. Thirty years have passed and Kessler had made no attempt to see them. In turn, his family hadn't seen him, yet it didn't bother him much.

Kessler lived in the apartment for ten years, but he remained relatively unknown to the building's occupants. It was the tenement janitor, Ignace, who knew Kessler best. He had been up to the apartment on occasion to play two-handed pinochle with Kessler, but grew tired of losing and stopped going up to see him. Ignace uses his free time to complain to his wife about the condition of Kessler's apartment and spreads rumors about Kessler to the other tenants.

One day Ignace and Kessler have a mundane quarrel and after a horrid exchange of words, Ignace runs and complains to his wife. He takes his complaints further by telling the story to Gruber, the tenement landlord. Gruber knew his janitor was exaggerating, but tells Ignace to give Kessler notice. That same night, he visits Kessler to give him notice to leave. Ignace is forced to speak through the door, noting that no one wants Kessler around.

Nonetheless, on December 1, Ignace finds Kessler's rent in his mailbox. After Gruber sees it, he becomes furious and forces way into Kessler's apartment. Gruber, agitated with Kessler, threatens to call in the city marshal to remove him. When Kessler tries to reason and plead with the landlord, Gruber vehemently belittles Kessler, comparing his flat to a toilet. Kessler pleads his innocence, citing he “didn’t do nothing” and he “will stay here.” However, his words fall on deaf ears and Gruber insists that he will toss Kessler out on the street after the fifteenth of December.

On December 15, Ignace finds the twelve-fifty Gruber had given Kessler in his mailbox. After Ignace phones Gruber, Gruber exclaims that he will get a dispossess. He instructs Ignace write a note stating that Kessler's money was refused and asks him to slide it under the door. The following day Kessler received a copy of his eviction notice asking that he appear in court in order to plead his case against the requested eviction. The notice scares him because he had never been to court in his life, and the fear keeps him from showing up on the ordered day.

On the same afternoon he is physically removed from the premises. Kessler sat outside, and people stared at him as he stared at nothing. The Italian woman, upon seeing him, shrieks uncontrollably. This action startles the neighbors and when they discover Kessler sitting outside, they gather and take Kessler and his belongings back to his apartment while Ignace stands aside screaming various obscenities. The Italian woman later sends food to Kessler.

Ignace tells Gruber of the incident and Gruber later enters Kessler's apartment finding him sitting on the bed. Gruber asks why Kessler is still there in the apartment. Kessler stays quiet, and Gruber explains to Kessler that if he stays his situation will worsen. Kessler questions Gruber's motivation to evict him from the premises...

"What did I do to you?" He bitterly wept. "Who throws out of his house a man that he lived there ten years and pays every month on time his rent? What did I do, tell me? Who hurts a man without a reason? Are you a Hitler or a Jew?" He was hitting his chest with his fist."

Gruber listens but explains his position, revealing that his building is falling apart and his bills are high. If tenants don't take care of their place then they must go. Acting on the information he has received from Ignace, Gruber tells Kessler he doesn't take care of his place and he fights with the janitor. It is for these reasons that Kessler must go.

Gruber decides to speak with Kessler once more to offer a more civilized solution. He would offer to put Kessler into a public home. When he enters the apartment he discovers Kessler sitting on the bedroom floor. For the first time, Gruber manages to speak to Kessler in calm, pleasant tone and explains his proposal but Kessler wasn't listening. Kessler sat quietly examining his past life, and is filled with miserable regret.

Gruber, frightened at Kessler's state of emotions, starts to reconsider his position and thinks he ought to allow the old man to stay. But then he sees Kessler engaged in the act of mourning and senses something is wrong. His first impulse is to run out of the apartment, however, he envisions himself tumbling five flights to his death and groans at the vision of himself lying lifeless at the bottom. Gruber realizes he is still in the room with Kessler, listening to him pray. He assumes maybe Kessler has received bad news or someone has died, but suddenly senses that perhaps the “someone” in question might actually be him.

== Characters ==
Kessler – He is an old man living alone. He had abandoned his family and does not interact well with others.

The Hoffmans – a sullen, childless German couple living on one side of Kessler who never bother to say hello or exchange a pleasant greeting with him.

The wizened Italian woman and her three sons – An Italian family living on the opposite side of Kessler who, just like the Hoffmans, don't say hello or exchange pleasantries.

Ignace – The janitor. This name is symbolic to the story as it a derivative form of the Latin ignis (fire).

Gruber – The landlord. The last name Gruber is a nickname from the inflected form of Yiddish dialect grub or coarser grubber jung, meaning ‘rude, impolite.’

== Themes ==
The theme of bleakness is highly prevalent in many of Malamud's works. Malamud describes the Hoffmans as a sullen, childless German couple, emphasizing they don't smile much. Malamud uses words which don't evoke pleasant thoughts. Kessler's flat, for instance is described as resembling a “filthy flat with its junky furniture.” Gruber even tells Kessler his apartment “looks like a junk shop and smells like a toilet.” Kessler isn't characterized in the most pleasant manner either. He is referred to as a “dirty old man” and “dirty old bum” and later described as a “corpse adjusting his coffin lid” when he opens the door to his apartment. The narrator also reveals that Kessler's “eyes were reddened, his cheeks sunken, and his wisp of beard moved agitatedly.” Other items are described with negative adjectives like “soiled,” “oily,” or “yellowed,” presenting a dull picture for the reader. Thus a reader doesn't perceive anything pleasant or warm in this story.

A highly valued theme in this short story is responsibility. According to professor Irving Halperin, responsibility is "the moral imperative for a person to respond responsibly to humanity in another." Malamud had employed this theme in other works, but it is found most prominently in "The Mourners." Halperin notes "Kessler's question, "Are you a Hitler or a Jew?", underscores the story's theme" of personal responsibility p. 464. Gruber had a choice to continuing acting as the rude tormentor or accept the responsibility of aiding his tenant. However, he fails to answer the question and therefore becomes blind in the name of responsibility. Consequently, the words may have entered into Gruber's consciousness because he does later choose to listen Kessler and does ponder the responsibility of getting Kessler into a public home. The act of responsibility also overcomes the sons of the Italian woman as well as other neighbors who once shunned Kessler. The sight of Kessler sitting outside in the snow was so harrowing that they feel compelled to carry him and his belonging back inside to his apartment. The narrator allows readers a glimpse into Kessler's thoughts near the end of the story, as he reflects on his past life. Heavily saddened, Kessler recognizes that he shirked his responsibility of staying with his family no matter his fate. This theme of responsibility reaches its peak at the end of the story as both Kessler and Gruber have fully recognized their faults and find that the only ones responsible are themselves.
