= The Assistant (Malamud novel) =

1957 novel by Bernard Malamud

- First edition cover
- Author: Bernard Malamud
- Cover artist: Moshe Goygadosh
- Language: English
- Publisher: Farrar, Straus and Giroux
- Publication date: 1957
- Publication place: United States
- Media type: Print (hardback & paperback)
- Pages: 246
- ISBN: 0-374-50484-9 (paperback, latest edition, 2003)
- OCLC: 734832
- Dewey Decimal: 813/.54 22
- LC Class: PS3563.A4 A8 2003
- Preceded by: The Natural (1952)
- Followed by: The Magic Barrel (1958)

The Assistant is the second novel by Bernard Malamud, published in 1957. Set in a working-class neighborhood of Brooklyn, New York, it explores the situation of first- and second-generation Americans in the early 1950s as experienced by three main characters and the relationships among them: an aging Jewish refugee from the Russian Empire who owns and operates a failing small grocery store; a young Italian American drifter trying to overcome a bad start in life by becoming the grocer's assistant; and the grocer's daughter, who becomes romantically involved with her father's assistant despite parental objections and misgivings of her own.

The novel was a finalist for the 1958 National Book Award for Fiction. It was adapted into a film of the same name in 1997.

== Plot ==
Morris Bober, the 60-year-old proprietor of an old-fashioned grocery store, faces destitution as his customers abandon him in favor of more modernized shops. The situation is aggravated late one night when he's held up at gunpoint in his deserted store by a pair of masked thugs. The gunman beats him, leaving Bober with a debilitating head injury. Just at this time, Frank Alpine makes his appearance: a 25-year-old vagrant from the West Coast, raised in an orphanage after his father abandoned him. Leaving an abusive foster home to live as a drifter, he makes his way East in hopes of finding opportunities to turn his life around. (Later he berates himself for having had many opportunities but inevitably doing something to botch them.)

Frank begins to haunt Morris' store and offers to work without pay as his assistant, claiming that this will give him experience he can use in a future job search. The grocer, weakened by the assault and trying to recuperate without benefit of medical care, accepts and arranges for him to have room and board with the upstairs tenants, a young Italian-American couple, and provides him some pocket money. Only at this point is it revealed to the reader that Frank was the accomplice to the gunman in the holdup.

Frank works industriously to improve the store's upkeep, and his attentive service wins customers. The resulting increased income is being supplemented by Frank's surreptitiously returning, in discreet amounts, his share of the holdup take. Simultaneously, however, he begins pilfering from the till. He justifies this to himself by claiming it as recompense for his contribution to the store's improved situation, and keeps an account of his petty theft with the intention of eventually returning it all. Morris and his wife Ida, the latter particularly uncomfortable with the gentile's presence, attribute the improvement to the customers' "preferring one of their own," and Morris insists on offering Frank more money. During lulls in the work day the men's conversations touch upon philosophical and personal matters, and Frank privately struggles with his own ethical quandary.

While Morris is notably tolerant of others, Ida is worried by the young Italyener's proximity to the couple's 23-year-old daughter, Helen, single and living at home. Helen is courted by the sons of the only other two Jews in the neighborhood, both young men with good financial prospects, but her dreams of a better life include true love. She also aspires to higher education, but has set aside her own plans in order to take a job as a secretary, as her wages are needed to supplement the family's meager income from the store.

Helen and Frank begin to notice each other, and a romance develops between them. They share an interest in books and discuss their dreams for the future. Their clandestine meetings grow in physical intimacy, yet at Helen's request stop short of intercourse. Just when she realizes she loves Frank and is committed to their relationship, Morris catches his assistant in the act of stealing. He dismisses Frank on the spot, despite the latter's confession and revelation that he "was paying it back." (His confession to Morris of his role in the holdup will follow.) When Frank arrives late to a rendezvous in the park initiated by Helen, he finds her being raped and rescues her. Helen is overcome by relief and clings to Frank, declaring her love for him. In his fear that he's bound to lose her when she learns of his thieving and dismissal, Frank forces himself upon her, despite her repeated protest. Disgusted with herself for ever having trusted him despite her initial misgivings, Helen curses Frank and refuses to see him again. Frank obsessively berates himself with remorse and contemplates ways to make things up to her. He apologizes to Helen profusely at every opportunity, smothering her with his need for redemption.

Meanwhile, the prospects for the store have remained bleak due to several turns of events, and Morris considers desperate measures. When he is hospitalized after inhaling gas from a radiator he failed to light (claiming afterwards that this was not deliberate), Frank comes back to run the store over Ida's protests.

Frank resolves to be a good person, stop stealing and somehow win back Helen's love. He takes on a second job at a diner. But, when Morris decides to leave his sick bed, he throws Frank out for good, or so he thinks.

Morris grows anxious about his life—his wife is miserable, his daughter on her way to spinsterhood and his poor business no more than a prison. Morris turns down an arsonist's offer to burn his home and store for the insurance money, but then builds a fire himself. As the flames catch on his apron, Morris is saved by Frank. After being saved, Morris sends Frank away again.

Then, through tragedy, things begin to look up for the Bobers. A competing grocer on the block falls on hard times, and Bober's store benefits. Then, one night, Ward Minogue breaks into the liquor store owned by Bober's rival, Karp. Minogue smashes liquor bottles, then he lights a cigarette. A tossed match starts a fire that burns the store and the apartment upstairs to the ground. Minogue dies attempting to escape the fire.

Morris is ashamed that he wished for his rival's comeuppance. Even so, Karp, knowing that he will lose his business while it is being rebuilt, offers to buy out the Bobers. For a few brief days, they are happy. It is the last day of March and thick snow is falling. Morris, in a burst of energy, goes out to shovel the sidewalk, despite Ida's many objections. Still weak from the gas incident, he dies three days later of double pneumonia.

Morris is remembered at his simple service as an honest man and a good Jew. But Frank and Helen are alienated. Frank returns to run the store while Helen and Ida mourn privately. Money from a second job allows Frank to pay rent to Ida but ruins his health.

Frank then settles on a plan to clear his debt with Helen. He will give over all his earnings so that Helen can go to college. After several painful and awkward confrontations, Helen reinterprets the night that Frank sexually assaulted her, concluding that she would have given herself to Frank that night had not Ward Minogue attacked her. She softens towards Frank, forgiving him for raping her.

As the book closes, Frank works in the store. He studies Judaism, gets a circumcision, and, after Passover, becomes a Jew.

== Literary significance and criticism ==
The novel was included in Time magazine's List of the 100 Best Novels between 1923 and 2010.
