= Bernard Malamud =

American writer (1914–1986)

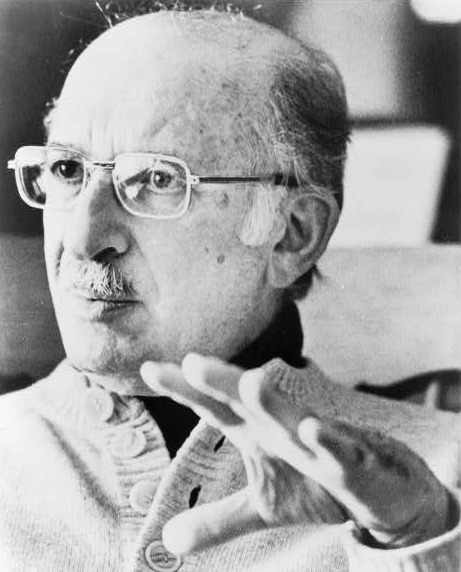
- Malamud c. 1979
- Born: April 26, 1914; Brooklyn, New York, U.S.
- Died: March 18, 1986 (aged 71); Manhattan, New York, U.S.
- Education: City College of New York (BA); Columbia University (MA)
- Occupations: Author, teacher
- Writing career
- Period: 1940–1985
- Genres: Novel, short story
- Notable works: The Natural, The Fixer

Bernard Malamud (April 26, 1914 – March 18, 1986) was an American novelist and short story writer. Along with Saul Bellow, Joseph Heller, Isaac Bashevis Singer, Norman Mailer and Philip Roth, he was one of the best known American Jewish authors of the 20th century. His baseball novel The Natural was adapted into a 1984 film starring Robert Redford. His 1966 novel The Fixer (also filmed), about antisemitism in the Russian Empire, won both the National Book Award and the Pulitzer Prize.

== Biography ==
Bernard Malamud was born on April 26, 1914, in Brooklyn, New York, the son of Bertha (née Fidelman) and Max Malamud, Russian Jewish immigrants who owned and operated a succession of grocery stores in the Williamsburg, Borough Park and Flatbush sections of the borough, culminating in the 1924 opening of a German-style delicatessen (specializing in "cheap canned goods, bread, vegetables, some cheese and cooked meats") at 1111 McDonald Avenue on the western fringe of Flatbush. (Then known as Gravesend Avenue, the thoroughfare received its current moniker in 1934, while the surrounding community—abutting the elevated BMT Culver Line and characterized as a "very poor" subsection of the neighborhood in a contemporaneous demographic survey of Brooklyn College students—is now considered to be part of the Kensington section.) A brother, Eugene, born in 1917, suffered from mental illness, lived a hard and lonely life and died in his fifties. Bertha Malamud was "emotionally unstable" and attempted suicide by swallowing disinfectant in 1927; although her elder son discovered her in time, she died in a mental hospital two years later.

Malamud entered adolescence at the start of the Great Depression, graduating from central Flatbush's storied Erasmus Hall High School in 1932. During his youth, he saw many films and enjoyed relating their plots to his school friends. He was especially fond of Charlie Chaplin's comedies. He received his BA degree from the City College of New York in 1936. Thereafter, Malamud worked for a year at $4.50 a day (equivalent to $104 in 2025) as a student teacher; however, he twice failed an examination that would enable him to become a permanent substitute teacher in the New York City public school system. Momentarily funded by a government loan, he completed the coursework for a master's degree in English at Columbia University in 1937–38; although he felt it was "close to a waste of time", he eventually received the degree after submitting a thesis on Thomas Hardy in 1942. From 1939 to 1940, he was a temporary substitute teacher at Lafayette High School in the Bath Beach section of Brooklyn. He was excused from World War II-era military service because he was the sole support of his father, who had remarried to Liza Merov in 1932. While working in a temporary capacity for the Bureau of the Census in Washington D.C., he contributed sketches to The Washington Post, marking some of his first published works. Returning to New York after the job ended, he taught English at Erasmus Hall (in its adult-oriented evening session) for nine years while focusing on writing during the day. Toward the end of this period, he also worked at the similarly oriented Chelsea Vocational High School (where he taught in the day program to supplement his income) and Harlem Evening High School.

Starting in 1949, Malamud taught four sections of freshman composition each semester at Oregon State University, an experience fictionalized in his 1961 novel A New Life. Because he lacked a PhD, he was not allowed to teach literature courses, and for a number of years, his rank was that of instructor; nevertheless, he was promoted to assistant professor in 1954 and became a tenured associate professor in 1958. While at OSU, Malamud devoted three days out of every week to his writing, and gradually emerged as a major American author. In 1961, he left OSU to teach creative writing at Bennington College, a position he held until retirement. He was elected to the American Academy of Arts and Sciences in 1967.

In 1942, Malamud met Ann De Chiara (November 1, 1917 – March 20, 2007), an Italian American Roman Catholic, and a 1939 Cornell University graduate. Despite the opposition of their parents (prompting their relocation from Brooklyn to Greenwich Village), they married on November 6, 1945. Ann typed his manuscripts and reviewed his writing. They had two children, Paul (b. 1947) and Janna (b. 1952). Janna is the author of a memoir about her father, titled My Father Is A Book.

Malamud was Jewish, an agnostic, and a humanist. He died in Manhattan (where he had maintained a winter residence at the Upper West Side's Lincoln Towers since 1972) on March 18, 1986, at the age of 71. He is buried in Mount Auburn Cemetery in Cambridge, Massachusetts. In his writing, Malamud depicts an honest picture of the despair and difficulties of the immigrants to America, and their hope of reaching their dreams despite their poverty.

== Writing career ==
Malamud wrote slowly and carefully; he is the author of eight novels and four collections of short stories. The posthumously published Complete Stories contains 55 short stories and is 629 pages long. Maxim Lieber served as his literary agent in 1942 and 1945.

He completed his first novel, The Light Sleeper, in 1948, but later burned the manuscript. His first published novel was The Natural (1952), which has become one of his best remembered and most symbolic works. The story traces the life of Roy Hobbs, an unknown middle-aged baseball player who achieves legendary status with his stellar talent. This novel was made into a 1984 movie starring Robert Redford.

Malamud's second novel, The Assistant (1957), set in New York and drawing on Malamud's own childhood, is an account of the life of Morris Bober, a Jewish immigrant who owns a grocery store in Brooklyn. Although he is struggling financially, Bober takes in a drifter of dubious character. This novel was quickly followed by The Magic Barrel, his first published collection of short stories (1958). It won Malamud the first of two National Book Awards that he received in his lifetime.

In 1967, his novel The Fixer, about antisemitism in the Russian Empire, became one of the few books to receive the National Book Award for Fiction and the Pulitzer Prize for Fiction. His other novels include Dubin's Lives, a powerful evocation of middle age (largely inspired by Malamud's own extramarital affairs) that employs biography to recreate the narrative richness of its protagonists' lives, and The Tenants, perhaps a meta-narrative on Malamud's own writing and creative struggles, which, set in New York City, deals with racial issues and the emergence of black/African American literature in the American 1970s landscape.

Malamud was renowned for his short stories, often oblique allegories set in a dreamlike urban ghetto of immigrant Jews. Of Malamud, Flannery O'Connor wrote: "I have discovered a short-story writer who is better than any of them, including myself." He published his first stories in 1943, "Benefit Performance" in Threshold and "The Place Is Different Now" in American Preface. Shortly after joining the faculty of Oregon State University, his stories began appearing in Harper's Bazaar, The New Yorker, Partisan Review, and Commentary.

== Themes ==
Writing in the second half of the twentieth century, Malamud was well aware of the social problems of his day: rootlessness, infidelity, abuse, divorce, and more. But he also depicted love as redemptive and sacrifice as uplifting. In his writings, success often depends on cooperation between antagonists. For example, in "The Mourners" landlord and tenant learn from each other's anguish. In "The Magic Barrel", the matchmaker worries about his "fallen" daughter, while the daughter and the rabbinic student are drawn together by their need for love and salvation.

== Posthumous tributes ==
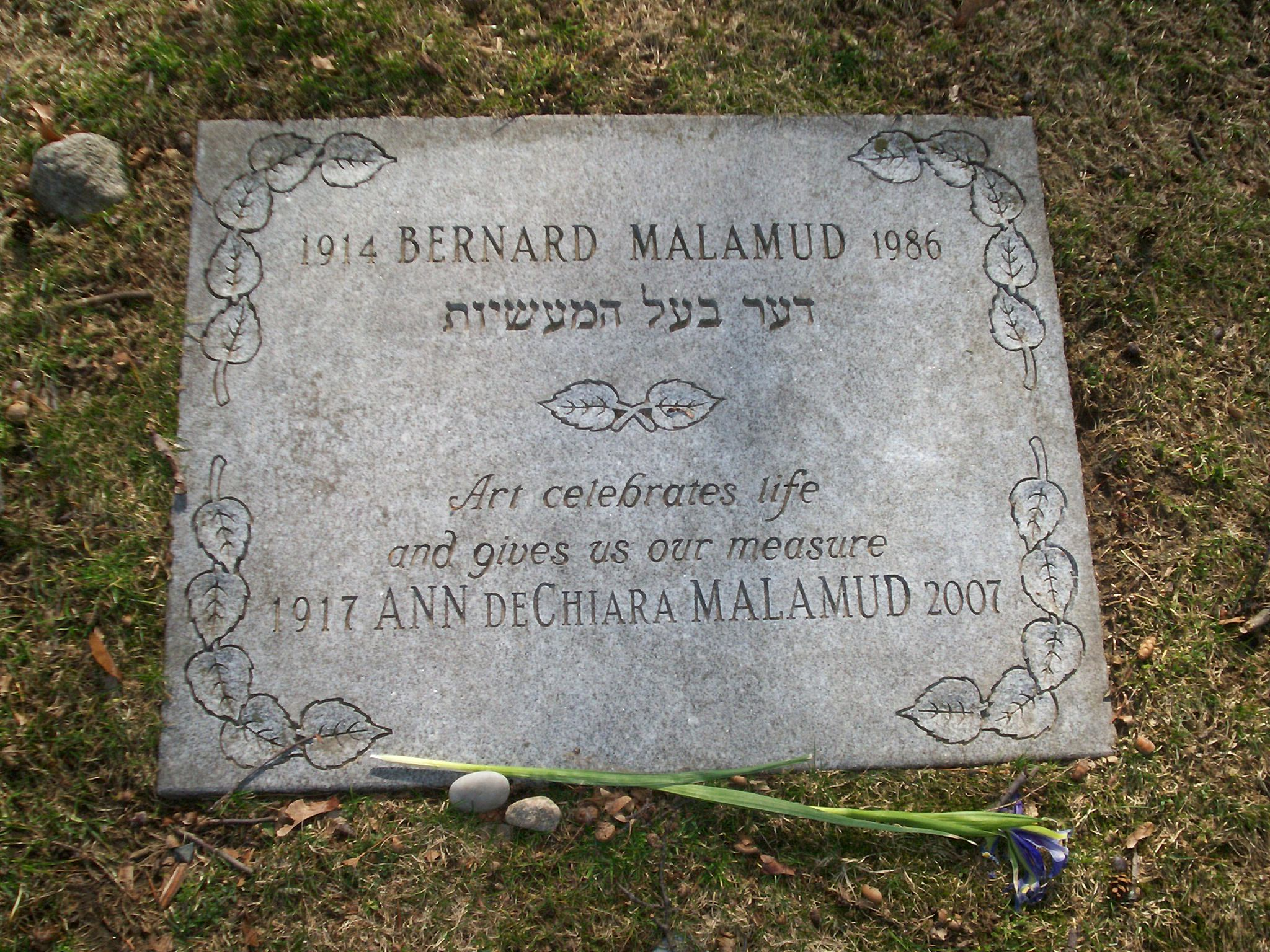
Grave of Bernard Malamud at Mount Auburn Cemetery

Philip Roth: "A man of stern morality", Malamud was driven by "the need to consider long and seriously every last demand of an overtaxed, overtaxing conscience torturously exacerbated by the pathos of human need unabated".

Saul Bellow, also quoting Anthony Burgess: "Well, we were here, first-generation Americans, our language was English and a language is a spiritual mansion from which no one can evict us. Malamud in his novels and stories discovered a sort of communicative genius in the impoverished, harsh jargon of immigrant New York. He was a myth maker, a fabulist, a writer of exquisite parables. The English novelist Anthony Burgess said of him that he 'never forgets that he is an American Jew, and he is at his best when posing the situation of a Jew in urban American society.' 'A remarkably consistent writer,' he goes on, 'who has never produced a mediocre novel .... He is devoid of either conventional piety or sentimentality ... always profoundly convincing.' Let me add on my own behalf that the accent of hard-won and individual emotional truth is always heard in Malamud's words. He is a rich original of the first rank." [Saul Bellow's eulogy to Malamud, 1986]

=== Centenary ===
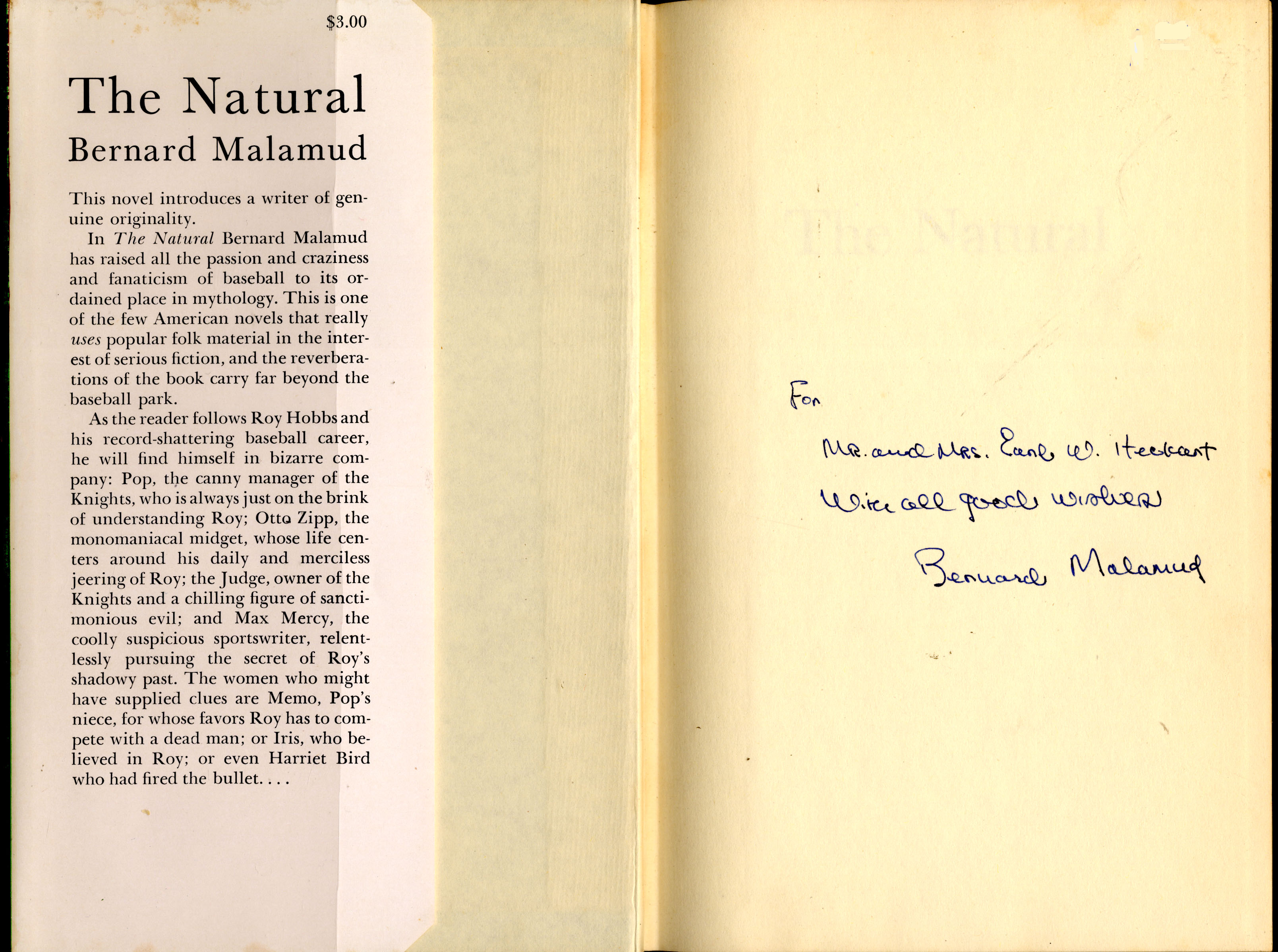
A signed copy of Malamud's book The Natural held by Oregon State University.

There were numerous tributes and celebrations marking the centenary of Malamud's birth (April 26, 1914). To commemorate the centenary, Malamud's current publisher (who still keeps most of Malamud's work in print) published on-line (through their blog) some of the "Introductions" to these works. Oregon State University announced that they would be celebrating the 100th birthday "of one of its most-recognized faculty members" (Malamud taught there from 1949 to 1961).

Media outlets also joined in the celebration. Throughout March, April, and May 2014 there were many Malamud stories and articles on blogs, in newspapers (both print and on-line), and on the radio. Many of these outlets featured reviews of Malamud's novels and stories, editions of which have recently been issued by the Library of America. There were also many tributes and appreciations from fellow writers and surviving family members. Some of the more prominent of these kinds of tributes included those from Malamud's daughter, from Malamud's biographer Philip Davis, and from fellow novelist and short story writer Cynthia Ozick. Other prominent writers who gathered for readings and tributes included Tobias Wolff, Edward P. Jones, and Lorrie Moore.

== Awards ==
- 1958 National Jewish Book Award, winner for The Assistant
- 1959 National Book Award for Fiction, winner for The Magic Barrel
- 1967 National Book Award for Fiction, winner for The Fixer
- 1967 Pulitzer Prize for Fiction, winner for The Fixer
- 1969 O. Henry Award, winner for "Man in the Drawer" in The Atlantic Monthly, April 1968
- 1984 PEN/Faulkner Award for Fiction, runner-up for The Stories

PEN/Malamud Award

Given annually since 1988 to honor Malamud's memory, the PEN/Malamud Award recognizes excellence in the art of the short story. The award is funded in part by Malamud's $10,000 bequest to the PEN American Center. The fund continues to grow thanks to the generosity of many members of PEN and other friends, and with the proceeds from annual readings. Past winners of the award include John Updike (1988), Saul Bellow (1989), Eudora Welty (1992), Joyce Carol Oates (1996), Alice Munro (1997), Sherman Alexie (2001), Ursula K. Le Guin (2002), and Tobias Wolff (2006).

== Bibliography ==
=== Novels ===
- The Natural (1952)
- The Assistant (1957)
- A New Life (1961)
- The Fixer (1966)
- Pictures of Fidelman: An Exhibition (1969)
- The Tenants (1971)
- Dubin's Lives (1979)
- God's Grace (1982)

=== Story collections ===
- The Magic Barrel (1958)
- Idiots First (1963)
- Rembrandt's Hat (1974)
- The Stories of Bernard Malamud (1983)
- The People and Uncollected Stories (includes the unfinished novel The People) (1989)
- The Complete Stories (1997)

=== Short stories ===
- "The First Seven Years" (1958)
- "The Mourners" (1955)
- "The Jewbird" (1963)
- "The Prison" (1950)
- "A Summer's Reading"
- "Armistice"

=== Books about Malamud ===
- Smith, Janna Malamud. My Father Is a Book: A Memoir of Bernard Malamud. (2006)
- Davis, Philip. Bernard Malamud: A Writer's Life. (2007)
- Swirski, Peter. "You'll Never Make a Monkey Out of Me or Altruism, Proverbial Wisdom, and Bernard Malamud's God's Grace". American Utopia and Social Engineering in Literature, Social Thought, and Political History. New York, Routledge 2011.

== Sources ==
- Contemporary Authors Online, Gale, 2004.
- Contemporary Literary Criticism
- Dictionary of Literary Biography, Volume 28: Twentieth Century American-Jewish Fiction Writers. A Bruccoli Clark Layman Book. Edited by Daniel Walden, Pennsylvania State University. The Gale Group. 1984. pp. 166–175.
- Smith, Janna Malamud. My Father Is a Book. Houghton-Mifflin Company. New York: New York. 2006
- Mark Athitakis, "The Otherworldly Malamud", Humanities, March/April 2014 | Volume 35, Number 2
