= Crane Building =

Crane Building may refer to the following buildings in the United States:

- Crane Company Building (Chicago), Chicago, Illinois, listed on the National Register of Historic Places (NRHP)
- Crane Building (Des Moines, Iowa), listed on the NRHP
- Crane and Company Old Stone Mill Rag Room, Dalton, Massachusetts, listed on the NRHP
- Crane Company Building (North Carolina), Charlotte, North Carolina, listed on the NRHP
- Crane Building (Chattanooga, Tennessee), listed on the NRHP in Tennessee
- Crane Building (Portland, Oregon)
- Crane Co Building of Memphis, Memphis Tennessee
