= Merle Reskin Theatre =

Theatre in Chicago, Illinois, United States

Coordinates: 41.8733°N 87.6253°W

- Blackstone Theatre
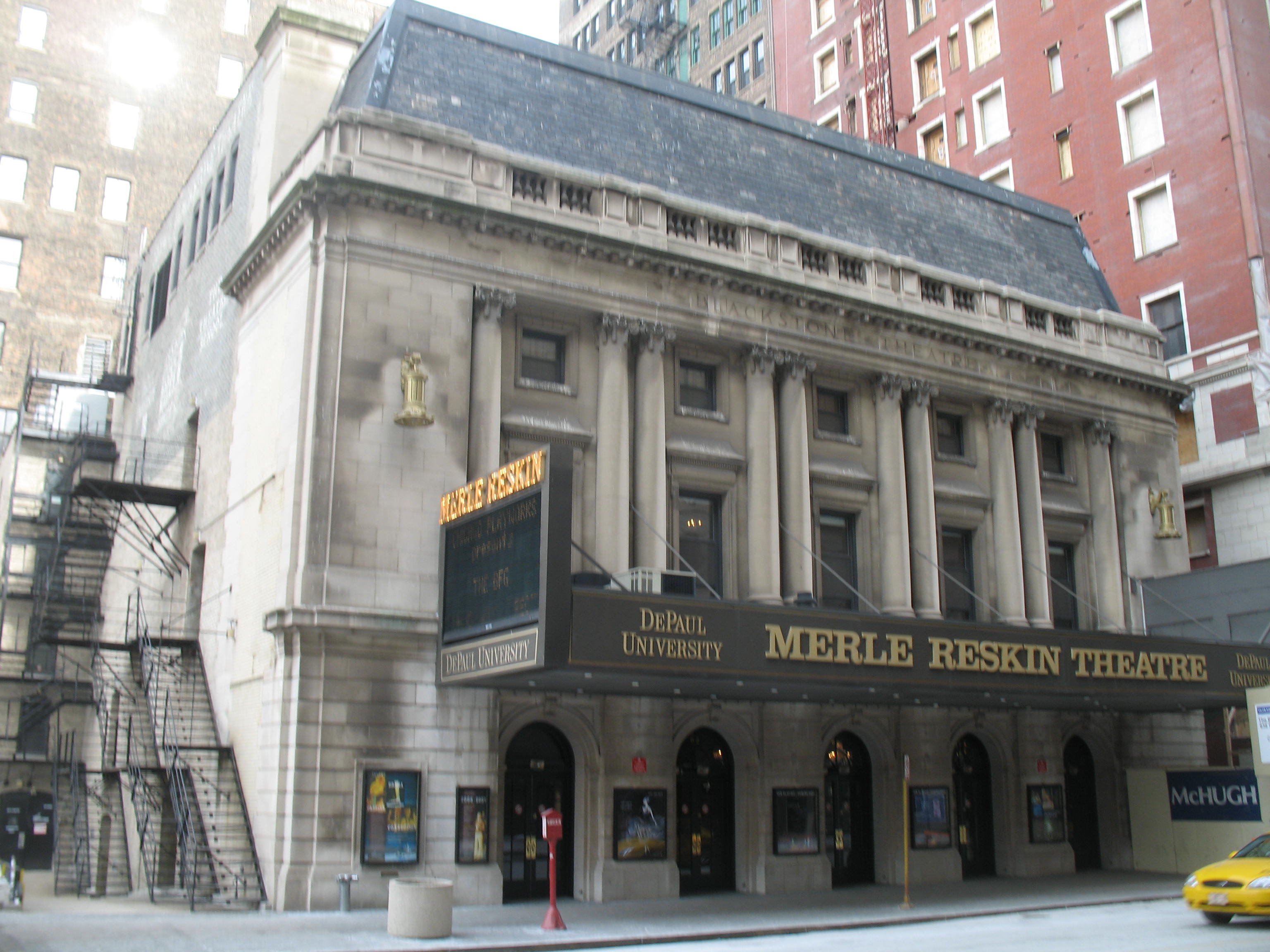
- The theatre in 2007

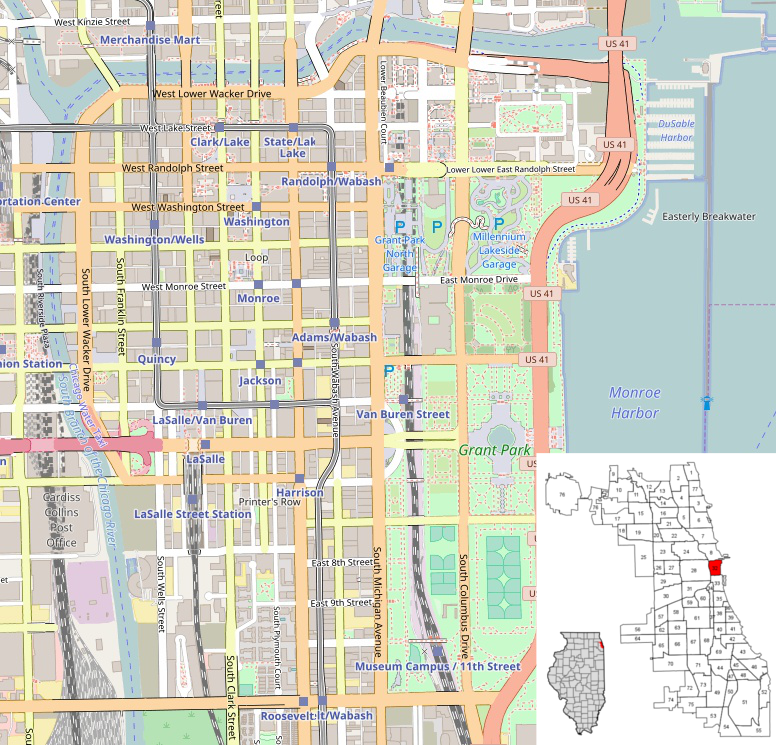
- Location within the Chicago Loop community area.
- Address: 60 East Balbo Drive; Chicago, Illinois; United States
- Owner: DePaul University
- Capacity: 1,325
- Current use: Stage performance
- Production: Goodman School of Drama

Construction
- Opened: December 31, 1910
- Closed: 1986–1988
- Years active: 1910–present
- Architects: Marshall and Fox (developed by Tracy C. Drake and John Drake)

Website
- http://theatreschool.depaul.edu

The Merle Reskin Theatre is a performing arts venue located in the Loop community area of Chicago, Illinois. Originally named the Blackstone Theatre it was built in 1910. Renamed the Merle Reskin Theatre in 1992, it is now part of DePaul University, and is also used for events and performances of other groups. It serves as the home of the Chicago Playworks for Families and Young Audiences series produced by The Theatre School of DePaul. In April, 2026, DePaul announced the Merle Reskin Theatre would close.

The theater was designed by Marshall and Fox, and developed by Tracy C. Drake and John Drake of Drake Hotel fame on the former site of Timothy Blackstone's mansion, adjacent to the Blackstone Hotel. The theater has a history of live performances that have often been touring productions of hit and prize-winning shows.

== Building ==
The architects who designed the new theatre in 1910 were Benjamin Marshall and Charles Fox of the firm Marshall and Fox, who also designed the adjacent Blackstone Hotel in 1909. As with the hotel, the theatre took its name from Timothy Blackstone, whose mansion had previously occupied the site. The original address was on Hubbard Court, which was later renamed Seventh Street, and renamed once again to East Balbo Drive, the current name. The building is six stories tall and built in a French Renaissance style. Constructed only seven years after the Iroquois Theater Fire, the theater was required to be fireproof and the management claimed the auditorium could be cleared in three minutes. Seating capacity was 1,400 people until 1988, when renovations to reinstate the orchestra pit and to create seating for handicapped persons reduced the seat count to 1,325.

The developers of both the Blackstone Hotel and Blackstone Theatre were Tracy C. Drake and John Drake, better known as developers and proprietors of the Drake Hotel. Their father, John Drake (1826-1895) had been a business partner of Blackstone's. The building of the Blackstone Theatre directly resulted in the shuttering of an older, nearby theatre, the Olympia.

== Blackstone Theatre Company ==
In an era when most entertainment was performed live on stage, the opening of a new theatre was considered so newsworthy that major newspapers reported on it. The proposed opening of the Blackstone was even noted by The New York Times, which wrote in mid-July 1909 that "...The new Blackstone Theatre, soon to be erected on Hubbard Place in Chicago... [will] have a large seating capacity, and is to be equipped with every modern theatrical device. The stage is to be patterned on that of the New Amsterdam Theatre in this city [New York]..." The Chicago Tribune also announced the up-coming event, and in a front-page story, the newspaper elaborated on what the Times had reported. The new theatre would feature the productions of Charles Frohman, who would operate the theatre jointly with impresarios Klaw & Erlanger; the three had incorporated under the name "Blackstone Theatre Company" (which was part of their larger Theatrical Syndicate, formed in 1896). The July 1909 Tribune article also pointed out that this new theatre would be an ornate "movie palace", able to seat about 1,200 people and costing in excess of half a million dollars to build. The Blackstone Theatre officially opened on December 31, 1910, with the premiere of a Chicago playwright George Ade's newest play "U.S. Minister Bedloe." It was a comedy that starred William H. Crane, and the critics were impressed by the play and by the beauty of the venue.

The Blackstone was managed by Harry J. Powers, a Chicago businessman with extensive experience in the theatre: he had worked his way up from his early days as an usher to ultimately become one of Mr. Erlanger's most trusted associated; Powers remained as the Blackstone's manager throughout its first two decades. The Blackstone's first productions featured some of that era's best known performers and playwrights—for example, after "U.S. Minister Bedloe" came a David Belasco production, "The Return of Peter Grimm", starring David Warfield. Many of the productions had already been well received in New York before coming to the Blackstone, such as another play that featured comic actor William H. Crane, "The Senator Keeps House." But while some of these productions were the equal of the version that played in New York, Tribune theatre critic Hammond observed on several occasions that the Chicago companies lacked the biggest stars. Despite this, the touring companies that performed at the Blackstone tended to do a good job and Hammond praised them for their "effective" productions. This trend of presenting touring company versions would continue in later years, when most of the performances at the Blackstone were plays which had already won the Pulitzer Prize or the Tony Award, and were presented by touring companies from New York.

During the first decade of operation, the Blackstone Theatre featured a number of unique productions. Among them were the performances of the Stratford-upon-Avon Players. Under the direction of F.R. Benson, they offered fourteen of Shakespeare's plays in two weeks during early November 1913. Also noteworthy was a presentation of George Bernard Shaw's "Pygmalion" in 1914; performances by the Boston Opera Company, featuring Mlle. Anna Pavlova in 1916 and Louis N. Parker's "Disraeli." And during periods of time when there was no play being performed, the Blackstone opened its doors to events sponsored by civic and fraternal organizations such as the Elks or Chicago's University Club. When Big Sisters was still a new organization, it held one of its first benefits at the Blackstone. The Blackstone was also the home to a large women's suffrage rally and conference in 1916; in attendance were 1,200 suffragists from all over the United States. And keeping up with the times, some of the performances from the stage of the Blackstone were heard on Chicago-area radio station WTAS, thanks to station owner Charles Erbstein, who thought it was a good idea to use the theatre for live broadcasts, and began doing so in early 1925.

Because the Blackstone Theatre was a touring theatre, many actors appeared there who would not have otherwise had that opportunity if the venue had specialized in new productions. Some of the actors who graced the stage of the Blackstone include William Gillette, Ethel Barrymore, John Barrymore, Helen Hayes, Ruth Gordon, Katharine Cornell, Cornelia Otis Skinner, and Spencer Tracy. During the 1920s the Blackstone presented 60 plays by playwrights such as George Bernard Shaw, Eugene O'Neill, Seán O'Casey, Sir Arthur Wing Pinero, Richard Brinsley Sheridan, Ben Jonson, Oliver Goldsmith, Frank Craven, Ring Lardner, and George M. Cohan.

== Post Blackstone Theatre Company ==
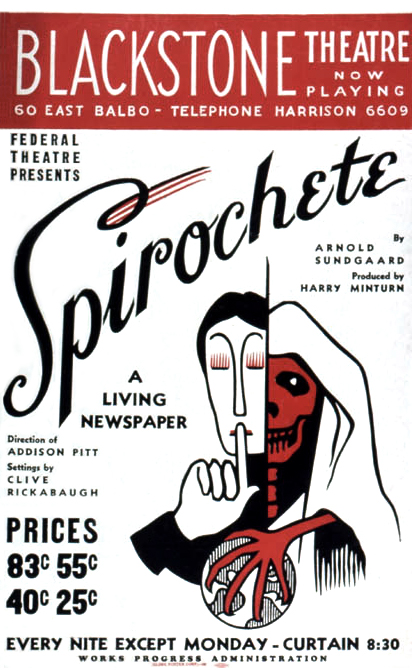
Poster for the original production of Spirochete, a Living Newspaper play by Arnold Sundgaard produced by the Federal Theatre Project (1938)

=== Lease ===
At the end of 1930, it was announced that the Blackstone Theatre Company was terminating its lease. Mr. Erlanger had died in March, the country was in the midst of the Depression, and newspaper reports remarked on how many businesses were suffering. Building owners John and Tracy Drake managed the theatre for a year before foreclosure loomed in 1932. In 1934, they leased the theatre to Playgoer's Incorporated, although this group only lasted a year.

The Blackstone was saved by the Federal Theatre Project, which leased the theater in 1936 and continued to use it for rehearsals and productions until the program was terminated by Congress in 1939. During this period, the Blackstone played host to original plays.

In 1940, the theater was rented by Oscar Sertin, who staged Life with Father starring Lillian Gish, which opened in February and ran for more than a year. The following year, Buddy Ebsen starred in "Good Night Ladies!", which ran for 100 weeks. From 1942 through 1945, the theatre was run by Slavin Amusement Company.

=== Shubert Brothers ===
In 1945, a reconstituted Blackstone Theatre Company managed the hall until 1948 when the Shubert Brothers bought the theatre. With the rise of other forms of entertainment, such as television, attendance at live theaters declined and the Shubert Organization scaled back the Blackstone's season from 28 weeks to as few as 14 weeks each year.

1959 saw the premiere of Lorraine Hansberry's "A Raisin in the Sun." Although the play was successful, after four weeks it left Chicago for New York City. Around the same time, a renaissance in Chicago theatre was taking place on the city's north side.

The Blackstone was dark from May 1986 until August 1988, when it reopened to Lily Tomlin's one woman show "The Search For Signs of Intelligent Life in the Universe." At this time, the Shubert Organization decided it was time to divest itself of all Chicago theatres except for the Shubert Theatre on Monroe Street.

=== The Theatre School ===
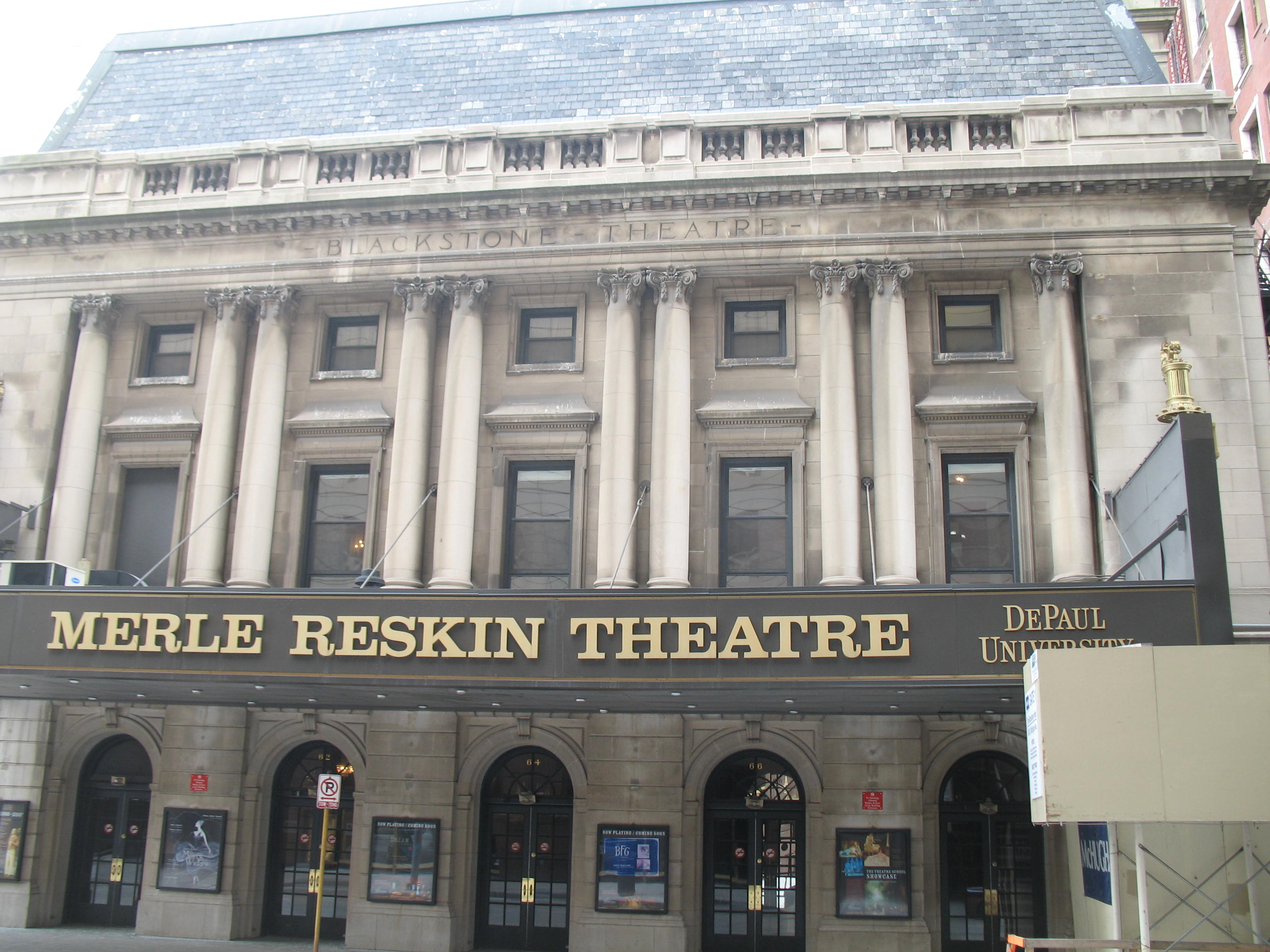
The marquee of the theatre in 2007

The Goodman School of Drama was founded in 1925. It joined DePaul University in 1978, and was renamed The Theatre School at DePaul University in 1985. Alumni include Gillian Anderson, John C. Reilly, Scott Ellis, Joe Mantegna, Theoni V. Aldredge, Karl Malden, Michael Rooker, Elizabeth Perkins, Judy Greer and Eugene Lee.

When the Shubert Organization decided to divest the majority of its Chicago theatres, the Blackstone Theatre building was offered to DePaul University. The Theatre School began officially performing in the Blackstone on March 21, 1989, with a production of The Misanthrope by Molière. In 1992, Harold and Merle Reskin made a sizable donation to the Theatre School, and on November 20, the theatre was renamed the Merle Reskin Theatre. Merle Reskin had spent five years as a professional actress, portraying Ensign Janet MacGregor in South Pacific on Broadway and appearing with Etta Moten. She gave up her career upon marrying Reskin in 1955; however, she spent thirty years as the Midwest Regional Auditioner for the American Academy of Dramatic Arts. In addition to The Theatre School, the building is also used by other arts organizations.

The theatre served as The Theatre School's main performance space until 2013 when a new facility opened on DePaul's Lincoln Park campus. Each year The Theatre School presents the Chicago Playworks series as well as The Theatre School Showcase, which both run throughout the academic year at the Merle Reskin Theatre. Chicago Playworks presents works intended for families and young audiences, while the Showcase series offers contemporary plays and classics.

In April 2026 DePaul University announced it was closing the theatre at the end of May 2026.
