= Crane Company Building =

Crane Company Building may refer to:

- Crane Company Building (Chicago)
- Crane Company Building (North Carolina), Charlotte, North Carolina
