= John Drake (1826–1895) =

American hotelier

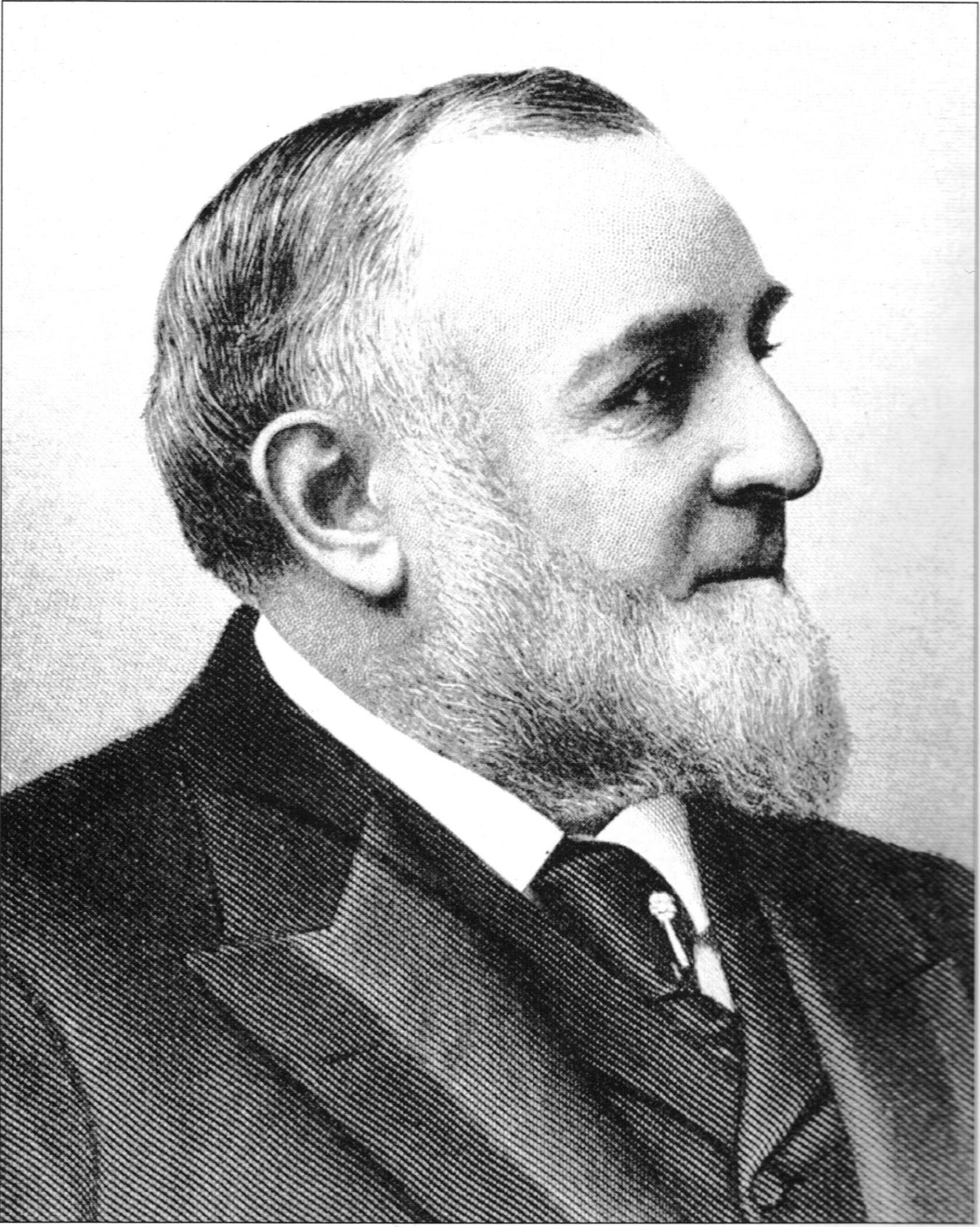
- Born: John Burroughs Drake; January 17, 1826; Lebanon, OH
- Died: November 12, 1895 (aged 69)
- Occupation: Hotelier
- Children: 3 sons and 2 daughters including John B. Drake (1872–1964) & Tracy C. Drake

John Burroughs Drake (January 17, 1826 – November 12, 1895) was a hotelier who was part owner of the Tremont House hotel in Chicago, Illinois. He managed the Grand Pacific Hotel from 1874 to 1895. His sons, John B. Drake and Tracy C. Drake were the developers and proprietors of the Blackstone Hotel and Drake Hotel, which are both located along Michigan Avenue in Chicago, Illinois. The former is located in the Chicago Landmark Historic Michigan Boulevard District and the latter along the Magnificent Mile. The Blackstone Hotel and Blackstone Theatre (now known as the Merle Reskin Theatre were built by his sons on the former site of the mansion of his business partner, Timothy Blackstone.

== Family and childhood ==
Drake was born in Lebanon, Ohio, the son of John Burroughs Drake a harness-maker from Trenton, New Jersey, and Nancy (Harry) Drake from Pennsylvania. His father died when he was 11 causing him to have to work in a store, while obtaining a "Common school" education. At 16 he took a job at a Lebanon tavern. In 1845, he embarked to Cincinnati, Ohio, where he worked as a hotel clerk for a pair of hotels.

He married Josephine Corey, daughter of Francis Edward Corey on February 24, 1863. They had three sons and two daughters.

== Career ==
By 1855 Drake had saved enough to purchase a quarter interest in leading Chicago hotel, Tremont House. He was the sole owner within 15 years. However, the Great Chicago Fire of 1871 burned down the Tremont. At the height of the fire, he made a payment on the Michigan Avenue Hotel at Michigan Avenue and Congress Street. The fire had been directly across the street from the hotel, but it managed to be the only hotel on the South side to escape the great fire. In 1873, he took over the Grand Pacific Hotel. His hotel became the western headquarters of the Republican Party. He eventually diversified into Union Stock Yards, Chicago & Alton Railroad, Illinois Trust & Savings Bank, Chicago Telephone and Chicago Edison Electric. John B. Drake also was a business partner of Jacob Bunn in the establishment of the Chicago Secure Depository Company.

He was known for his annual Thanksgiving Game Dinner, which was a celebrated Chicago tradition. The 30th Anniversary party was held in 1885 at the Grand Pacific Hotel for over 500 guests. "On Thanksgiving 1886 John B. Drake... offered his patrons a sumptuous game dinner that included... venison soup, leg of mountain sheep, ham of bear, buffalo tongue, blue-winged teal, leg of elk, and sandhill crane to antelope steak in mushroom sauce, oyster pie, fillet of grouse with truffles, and rabbit braise with cream sauce" These dinners continued for more than 50 years as a Chicago social institution.
