= Tracy Drake =

American developer & hotelier (1864–1939)

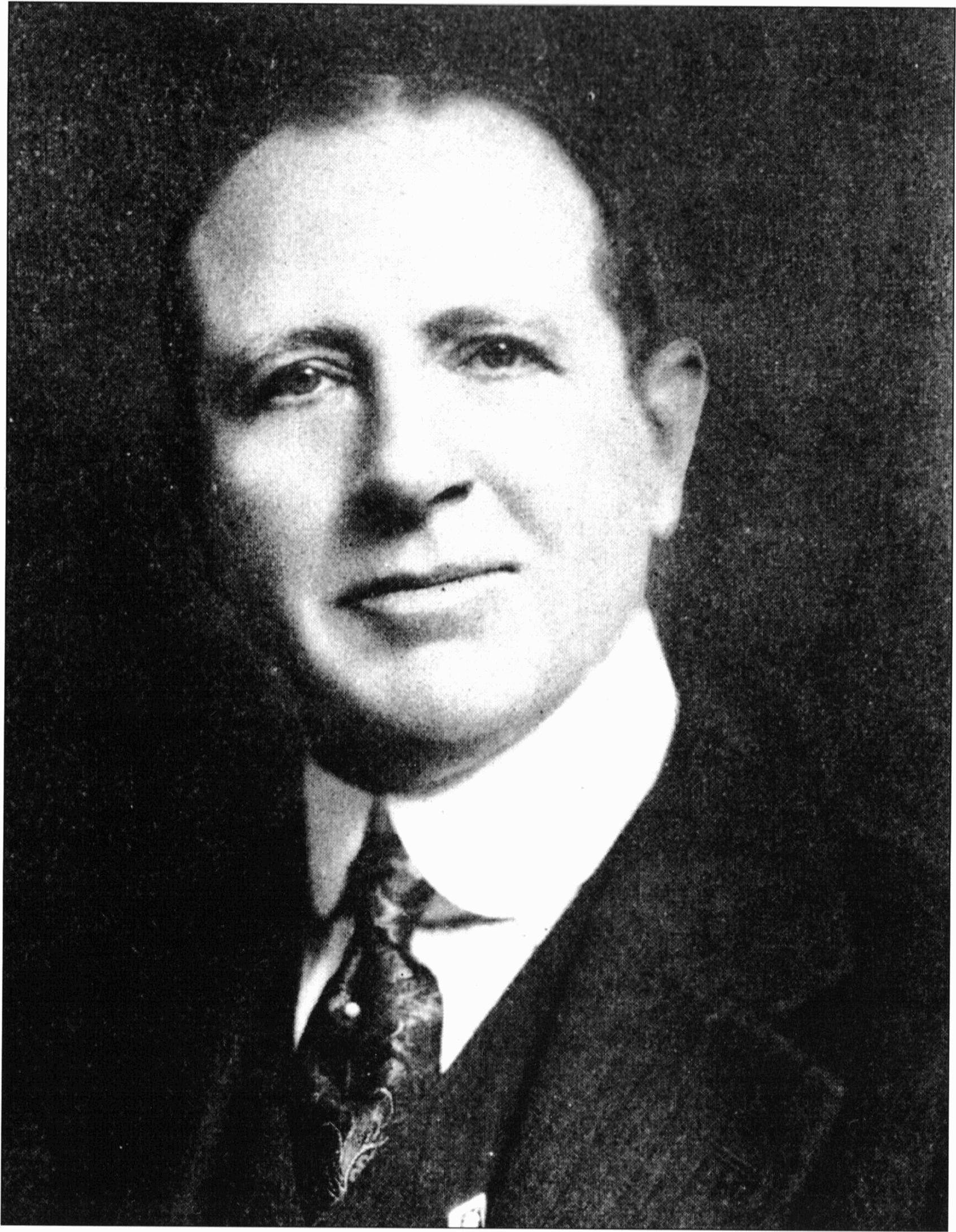
- Born: Tracy C. Drake; 1864
- Died: 1939 (aged 74-75); Laguna Beach, CA
- Occupation: Hotelier
- Spouse: Annie Daughaday Drake
- Children: Carlos Francis (4 Grandchildren including Betsy Drake)
- Parent(s): John Burroughs Drake (1826-1895) & Josephine C. Corey

Tracy C. Drake (1864–1939) and his brother John Drake Jnr. were the developers and proprietors of the Blackstone Hotel and Drake Hotel, which are both located along Michigan Avenue in Chicago, IL. The former is located in the Chicago Landmark Historic Michigan Boulevard District and the latter along the Magnificent Mile. Their father John Drake (1826-1895), was also a hotelier and the business partner of Timothy Blackstone.

== Biography ==
In 1898, Drake acquired property on the south shore of Geneva Lake, Wis., from Arthur Kaye and hired Howard Van Doren Shaw to design a summer home there for his family. "Aloha Lodge", a Southern colonial architecture-style country estate, was completed in March 1901. The name was inspired by the Drakes' recent travels to Hawaii, where the family befriended the recently deposed Hawaii'an queen Lilliuokalani.

In Chicago, Drake and his brother John acquired the property for the Drake Hotel from the estate of Potter Palmer in 1916 after it gave up on the idea of building a hotel itself. The Drake Hotel opened on New Year's Eve in 1920.

== Personal life ==
He is the grandfather of the American film actress and writer Betsy Drake, who was the third wife of Hollywood actor Cary Grant,
