= The Blackstone Hotel =

Historic hotel in Chicago, Illinois

- Blackstone Hotel
- U.S. National Register of Historic Places
- Chicago Landmark
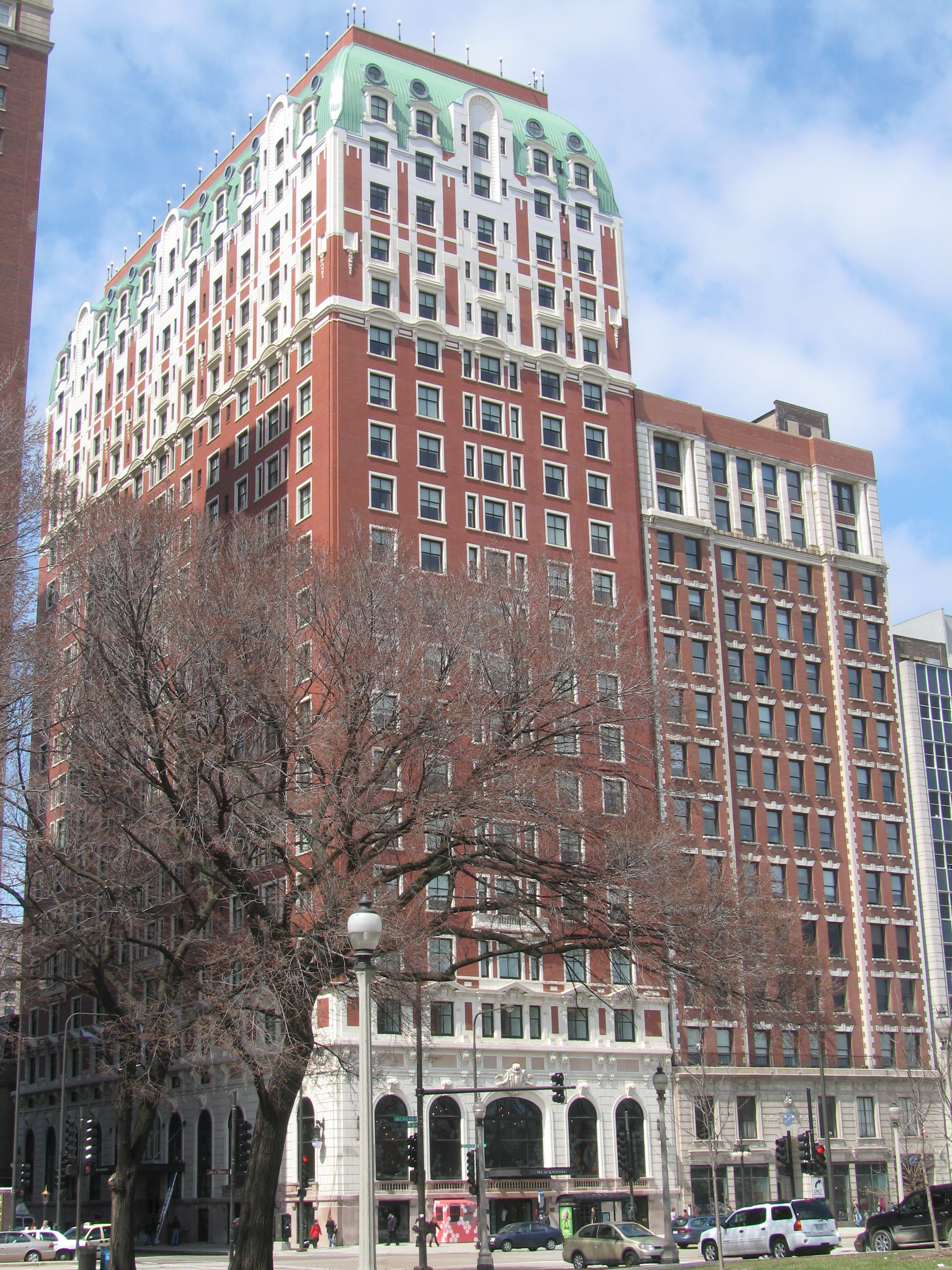
- The Blackstone Hotel in 2008

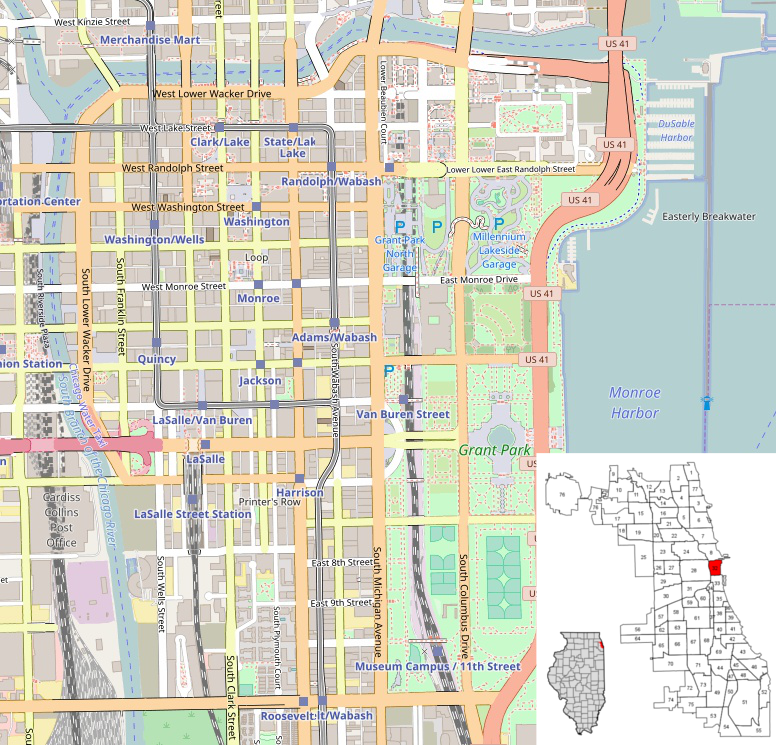
- Location within Chicago Loop
- Location: 636 S. Michigan Avenue (80 East Balbo Drive); Chicago, Illinois
- Coordinates: 41°52′24″N 87°37′29″W
- Built: 1909; 117 years ago
- Architect: Benjamin Marshall
- Architectural style: Second Empire; Beaux-Arts
- NRHP reference No.: 86001005

Significant dates
- Added to NRHP: May 8, 1986
- Designated CHICL: May 29, 1998

The Blackstone Hotel is a historic 290-foot (88 m) 21-story hotel on the corner of Michigan Avenue and Balbo Drive in the Michigan Boulevard Historic District in the Loop community area of Chicago, Illinois. Built between 1908 and 1910, it is on the National Register of Historic Places. The Blackstone is famous for hosting celebrity guests, including numerous U.S. presidents, for which it was known as the "Hotel of Presidents" for much of the 20th century, and for contributing the term "smoke-filled room" to political parlance.

== History ==
=== Early years ===
The hotel and the adjacent Blackstone Theatre were built on the former site of railroad millionaire Timothy Blackstone's mansion in 1908. The owners were brothers John and Tracy Drake, sons of Blackstone's former business partner, the hotel magnate John Drake. John and Tracy Drake also developed the luxury Drake Hotel. At the time of the opening, the hotel and theatre were located at the southern edge of the Chicago Theatre District at Michigan Avenue and Hubbard Court (which was first renamed 7th Street and later Balbo Drive).

The hotel opened on April 6, 1910. Its namesake, Timothy Blackstone, was a notable Chicago business executive and politician, who served as the founding president of the Union Stock Yards, president of the Chicago and Alton Railroad, and mayor of La Salle, Illinois. Built from 1908 to 1910, it was designed by Marshall and Fox. The original construction was capitalized at $1.5 million (equivalent to $51.8 million in 2025), including a $600,000 to $750,000 bond issue by the Drake Hotel Company.

=== Later years ===
In the 1920s, the Drake Hotel Company undertook some financing arrangements which included extending their debt to construct the Drake Hotel. They used the Blackstone Hotel as collateral for one loan in 1927. The Wall Street Crash of 1929 rippled into the hotel industry, leaving the Chicago Title and Trust Company with 30 Chicago hotels in receivership and causing the Drakes to default in 1932. The hotel ended up belonging to Metropolitan Life, which held the mortgage. MetLife leased the Blackstone to hotelier Arnold Kirkeby in 1936, and Kirkeby bought the hotel outright in 1941. Kirkeby sold the hotel to Sheraton Hotels in 1954 and it was renamed the Sheraton-Blackstone Hotel. The hotel endured troubles in the late 1960s, as the neighborhood surrounding it declined, and Sheraton finally sold the property to local hotelier Mark Friedman on September 12, 1973, for $5 million (equivalent to $36.3 million in 2025), and the hotel became the Blackstone Hotel again. In 1995, the Blackstone was sold to the Maharishi Mahesh Yogi. The hotel was home to both Jazz Showcase from 1981 to 1995 and Shear Madness from 1982 to 1999.

On May 29, 1998, the Blackstone Hotel was designated as a Chicago Landmark. The hotel was added to the National Register of Historic Places on May 8, 1986. It is also a historic district contributing property for the Chicago Landmark Historic Michigan Boulevard District.

=== Closure ===
The hotel closed in 2000, after Occupational Safety and Health Administration building inspectors found safety problems during a 1999 inspection. The building's owner, Heaven on Earth Inns Corp, run by Maharishi Mahesh Yogi, looked into several options before selling the property to Rubloff, Inc., which in 2001 announced plans to convert the building into condominiums priced as high as $8.5 million (equivalent to $15.5 million in 2025). Rubloff's plans were unsuccessful due to financing difficulties and a lackluster market for buyers of Blackstone condominiums. Even two rounds of price cuts were not enough to spur interest in the condo opportunities and Maharishi Mahesh Yogi's non-profit organization was unable to obtain financing.

=== Restoration ===
In 2005, it was announced that the hotel would undergo a $112 million renovation and acquisition ($22 million of the expected $112 million was the cost associated with the acquisition) with a planned opening in 2007 in a deal between Marriott International/Renaissance Hotels and Sage Hospitality, a Denver, Colorado-based company. Sage had been interested in the property long before the condominium conversion was attempted. The hotel's restoration process was quite lengthy because of the extensive interior damage. Sage sought $22 million in tax increment financing from the Chicago Community Development Commission. They eventually were approved for $18 million in tax-increment financing. The final cost of the restoration came to $128 million, of which the city of Chicago provided $13.5 million for street-front improvement, including the restoration and recasting of over 10,000 pieces of decorative terra cotta, and federal historical tax credits because the building is a historical landmark. The Chicago Landmark status necessitated renovation oversight by the Commission on Chicago Landmarks.

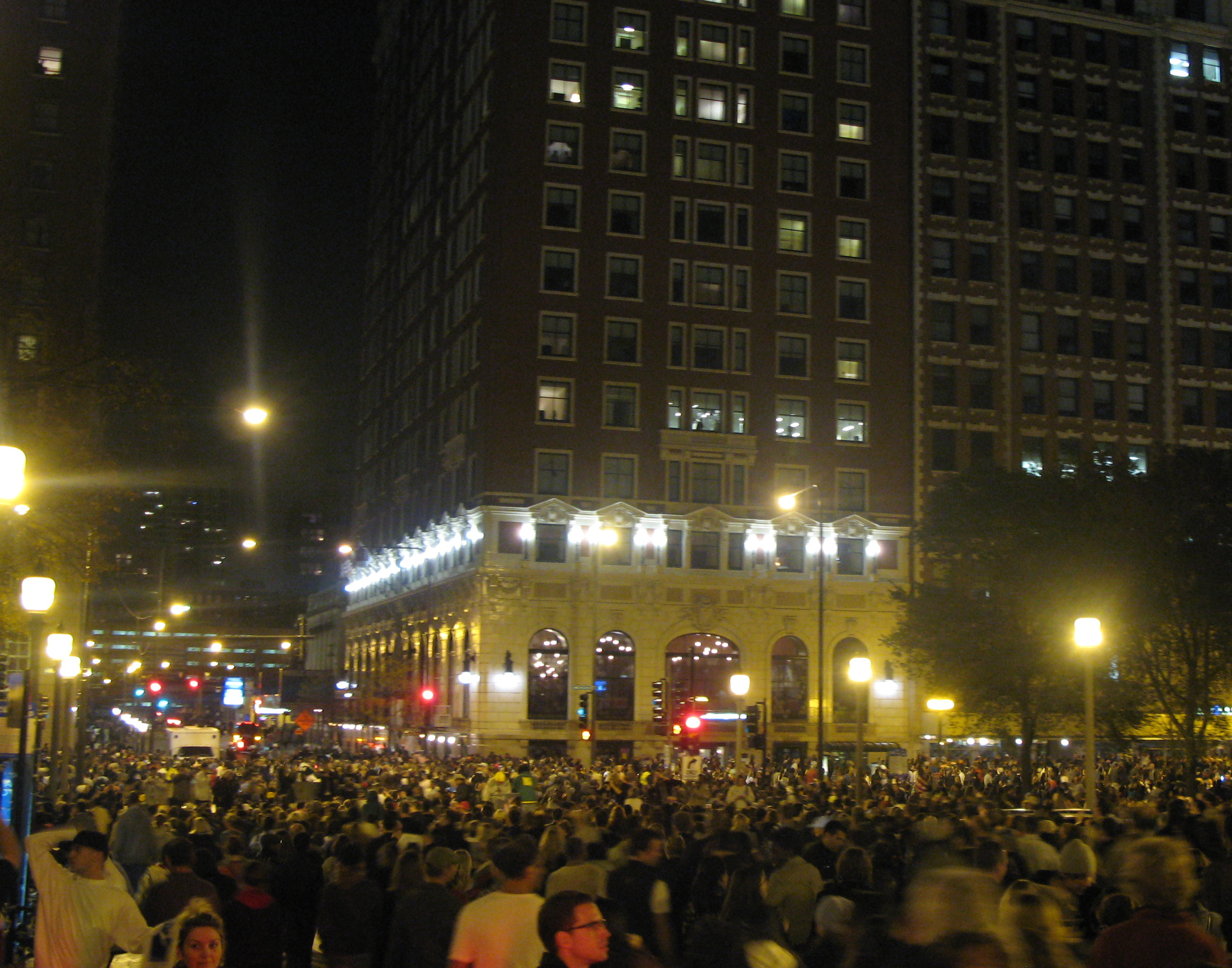
View along Michigan Avenue outside of The Blackstone of crowds leaving Grant Park after Barack Obama's 2008 election victory speech

The newly restored Renaissance Blackstone Hotel reopened to the public on March 2, 2008, and celebrated its grand reopening on April 30, 2008, with a ribbon-cutting ceremony. The other parties involved in the restoration were local architect Lucien Lagrange and hotel interior design, development, and procurement firm Gettys, for design work. James McHugh Construction Co. was responsible for construction. The engineering firm handling the exterior renovation was Illinois-based Wiss, Janney, Elstner Associates, Inc.

The restoration resulted in 332 rooms, 12 suites, and 13,230 square feet (1,229 m^{2}) of meeting space. The 21-story hotel is now equipped with a health club, a business center, and a street-level cafe with outdoor seating area. As part of the restorations, sconces and chandeliers were restored. Many of the details, such as brass fittings, several of the statues and the original chandeliers, had been sold off. However, Sage was able to repurchase many of them on eBay and refabricate many others. The primary historic facades were fully restored, including the hotel's ornate terra cotta-clad exterior. All the guest-room floors were reconfigured and dramatically enlarged. Some have described the restoration as "garish".

Only two guest rooms were preserved during the restoration: the famous ninth-floor "smoke-filled room" and the original tenth-floor presidential suite. They both retained their original floors, fireplaces, and structural shapes. However, the Presidential Suite's famed hidden passage behind the fireplace—which allowed the president to exit through the hotel's eastern stairwell unnoticed—has been converted into closet space. Notable features that failed to survive the renovation were a barbershop, which has been converted to a rentable meeting room named "the barbershop", and the theater, which was converted to the Blackstone's bar and restaurant.

On June 7, 2017, The Blackstone was transferred from Marriott's Renaissance Hotels division to their Autograph Hotels division and returned to its historic name, The Blackstone Hotel. The transition included a renovation to update the look of the hotel with a historic meets-contemporary-feel by revitalizing the soft goods of the guest rooms, meeting spaces and lobby. The hotel formerly featured a bar in the lobby called Timothy's Hutch, paying homage to the hotel's namesake, Timothy Blackstone.

== Hotel and politics ==
The Blackstone Hotel has been dubbed "The Hotel of Presidents". It was once considered one of Chicago's finest luxury hotels, and a dozen 20th-century U.S. presidents have stayed at the hotel. In addition, the Blackstone has also become part of Chicago's history as the city that has hosted more United States presidential nominating conventions (26) than any other two American cities, a history which goes back to the 1860 Republican National Convention hosted at the Wigwam. The hotel has a special room designed for use by presidents which was separated from the rest of the hotel by hollowed out walls in which the Secret Service could operate. In 1920, Warren G. Harding was selected as the Republican candidate for the presidency at the Blackstone. Although the convention was being held at the Chicago Coliseum, a group of Republican leaders met at the Blackstone on the night of June 11 to come to a consensus. When Raymond Clapper of United Press reported on the decision-making process, the reporter stated it had been made "in a smoke-filled room". The phrase entered American political parlance to denote a political process which is not open to scrutiny.

In addition, the Blackstone is where Franklin Delano Roosevelt's third-term Democratic presidential nomination was forged in 1940, where Harry S. Truman stayed when he received the 1944 Democratic vice presidential nomination and where Dwight D. Eisenhower heard the news of his first-ballot 1952 Republican presidential nomination. In all, guests have included at least 12 U.S. presidents: Theodore Roosevelt, William Howard Taft, Woodrow Wilson, Warren Harding, Calvin Coolidge, Herbert Hoover, Franklin Roosevelt, Harry Truman, Dwight Eisenhower, John F. Kennedy, Richard Nixon, and Jimmy Carter. During Kennedy's visit he was informed of the Cuban Missile Crisis.

== Architecture ==
The Blackstone Hotel was designed by architect Benjamin Marshall, of Marshall and Fox, in 1909. Sources vary as to the precise style in which Marshall designed the building. According to the Landmarks Division of the City of Chicago's Department of Planning and Development, the hotel's exterior and interior are considered an excellent example of neoclassical Beaux-Arts architecture; the nomination form for the building's listing on the U.S. National Register of Historic Places classifies the structure as distinctly Second Empire. However, the two styles are related, and the Blackstone Hotel demonstrates elements from both schools. The design was influenced by Marshall's trip to Paris, after which he completed the hotel.

The Blackstone is a 22-floor rectangular structure and its structural steel frame is cased in tile and plaster fireproofing. On the exterior south and east (front) elevations is a one-story base of pink granite, with high arched openings; it supports the red brick- and terra cotta-trimmed building shaft. Above the granite base are four stories of white, glazed terra cotta. The large windows of the second and third floor, which once poured natural light into the lobby, ballroom, and restaurants, had mostly been covered for the Mayfair Theatre which was the home of the Chicago production of Shear Madness for 17 years from September 22, 1982, to November 11, 1999. The majority of the building rises as a 12-story shaft of red brick dotted with white, terra cotta window surrounds; above this section is a belt course of terra cotta and two stories of red brick. Above this, the original design included an intermediate terra cotta cornice topped by a cast-iron railing. This has been removed and replaced with red brick and white glazed brick, flush with the rest of the building. The mansard roof was originally decorated with small spires around the perimeter, and 2 very tall flagpoles.

== In popular culture ==
In addition to its celebrity guests and its contributions to political parlance, the Blackstone has a place in popular culture. Among its uses in cinema, it hosted the banquet where Al Capone smashes a guest's head with a baseball bat in the Brian De Palma film The Untouchables, a party in The Hudsucker Proxy, and Tom Cruise's pre-pool tourney stay in The Color of Money. Also, the 1996–2000 television series Early Edition was set in this building, featuring a man (Kyle Chandler) who lives in the hotel and receives the newspaper a day in advance.

The hotel is referenced as part of a major plot point in the play Cat on a Hot Tin Roof by Tennessee Williams and the accompanying film.

== See also ==
- Blackstone Library
- Chicago architecture

== Works cited ==
- Berger, Miles L. (1992). They Built Chicago: Entrepreneurs Who Shaped a Great City's Architecture. Chicago: Bonus Books. ISBN 0-929387-76-7.
