= Timothy Blackstone =

American railroad executive, philanthropist

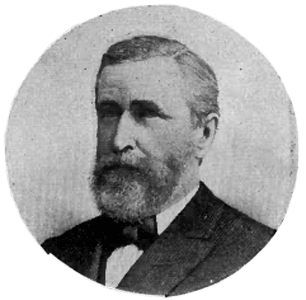

Mayor of La Salle, Illinois
- In office 1854–1855

Personal details
- Born: March 28, 1829 Branford, Connecticut
- Died: May 26, 1900 (aged 71) Chicago, Illinois
- Spouse: Isabella Farnsworth Norton (m. 1868)

Timothy Beach Blackstone (March 28, 1829 – May 26, 1900) was an American railroad executive, businessman, philanthropist, and politician. He is descended from William Blaxton, an early settler of New England. He worked in the railroad industry for most of his life after dropping out of school. At the time of his death, his estate was worth US$6 million ($232.2 million today).

Blackstone served as president of the Chicago and Alton Railroad from 1864 through 1899, was a founding president of the Union Stock Yards, and served one term as mayor of La Salle, Illinois. He was the benefactor of the James Blackstone Memorial Library in Branford, Connecticut, and his widow donated the Blackstone Memorial Library to the Chicago Public Library in 1902, the first dedicated branch of the Chicago Public Library system. The Blackstones also funded Blackstone Hall for the Art Institute of Chicago Building, and his mansion became the site of the Blackstone Hotel and the Blackstone Theatre.

== Early life ==
Blackstone was born in Branford, Connecticut, the sixth child, and fourth son, of James Blackstone and Sarah Beach. His father, James, served in the Connecticut Senate representing the sixth district. James had also served in the Connecticut House of Representatives and the Connecticut militia. The family is descended from William Blaxton, an English settler who arrived in New England in the seventeenth century and became the first European settler in Rhode Island. William Blackstone, an English judge and jurist, is a distant cousin.

Health issues caused Blackstone to drop out of school in 1847, and he began working for Roswell B. Mason, surveying the New York and New Haven Railroad (NY&NH). He only worked on the NY&NH for a year before becoming an assistant engineer on the Stockbridge and Pittsfield Railroad. Again, he only remained with the firm a short time before leaving for the Vermont Valley Railroad. In 1851, Roswell invited Blackstone to supervise construction of the Illinois Central Railroad between Bloomington and Dixon, Illinois. Blackstone accepted the job and moved to La Salle, Illinois.

== Career and life ==
Blackstone was elected mayor of LaSalle in 1854 and served a single term, his only foray into politics. After leaving office, he returned to working on railroads, first as chief engineer of the Joliet and Chicago Railroad, which would eventually become the Chicago and Alton Railroad. Blackstone became president of the Joliet and Chicago Railroad in 1861, and he kept the line solvent while other divisions were filing for bankruptcy. When the system was reorganized, he was named president of the board of directors for the company, serving with John Drake. Although Blackstone served with the Alton Railroad for more than a quarter century, he refused a salary. When the directors voted to pay him $10,000 per year, he turned it down. In addition to his employment and activities with the railroads, Blackstone was the first president of the company that controlled the Union Stock Yards.

Although Blackstone had refused a salary from the railroad, he was an investor in it. In 1899, a competing group of investors headed by E. H. Harriman wanted to purchase the Alton Railroad but Blackstone disapproved of the sale. After many months of wrangling, Blackstone transferred all of his stock in the company to the United States Trust Company and resigned as president, effective April 1, 1899. This action allowed the Harriman-led group to assume control of the line.

In 1868, Blackstone married Isabella Farnsworth Norton, the daughter of a successful businessman from Norwich, Connecticut. Blackstone died of pneumonia on May 26, 1900, in Chicago, Illinois. His funeral was held at the Second Presbyterian Church and was then transported to Norwich, Connecticut for burial.

== Blackstone Mansion ==
Blackstone built a 19th-century mansion for himself at 252 Michigan Avenue in Chicago in what is now the Historic Michigan Boulevard District. The property later became the site of the Blackstone Hotel and the Blackstone Theatre. Following the Great Chicago Fire in 1871, he invited his friend John Crerar to stay with him, which Crerar did for twelve years. Crerar donated the John Crerar Library and Blackstone continued to donate funds toward the maintenance of the building throughout his life. The Crerar Library has now merged with the University of Chicago.

== Bequests ==
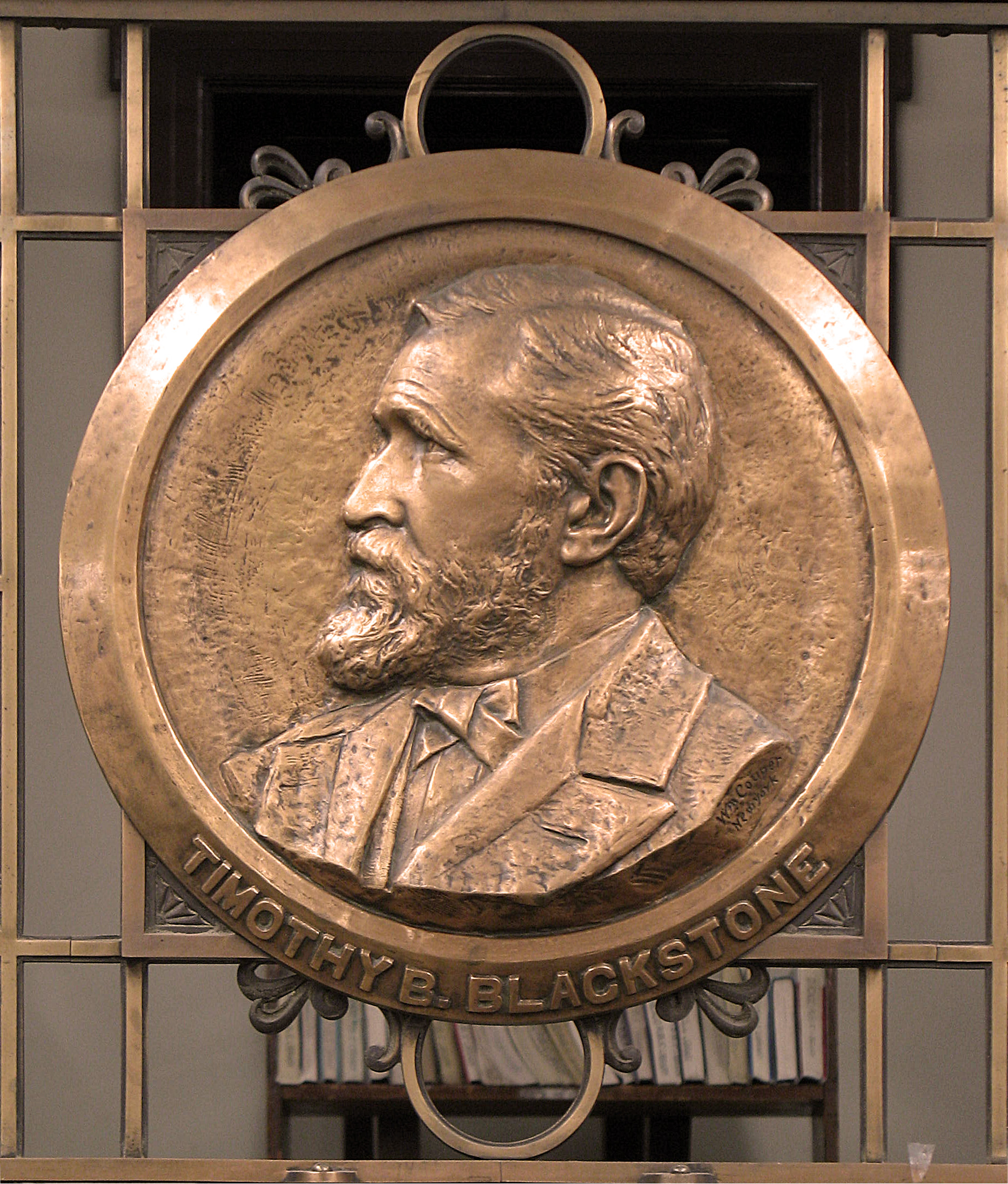
Plaque by William Couper at Blackstone Library

Blackstone donated a library of 5,000 books and a building to the city of Branford, Connecticut with the only stipulation that it be named in honor of his father. A charter was devised for the library by the Connecticut State Legislature vesting control of the library in a self-perpetuating board of trustees consisting of six residents of Branford and the librarian of Yale University. The building was designed by Chicago architect Solon Spencer Beman. The library was constructed from 1893–96.

In 1904, Isabella Blackstone donated the T.B. Blackstone Memorial Branch Library to the city of Chicago. Located at the intersection of Blackstone Avenue, Lake Park Avenue, and Forty-Ninth Street, the library is modeled after the James Blackstone Library in Branford, Connecticut. Blackstone Avenue running along the 1436 east block from 4900 south (starting behind Blackstone Library) to 10350 south is named after him.

Also, the Blackstone's funded Blackstone Hall in the Art Institute of Chicago Building. The two-story ground level gallery was added next to the east wall of the original building for display of architectural and sculptural casts.

The New York Times published details of his will. When Blackstone died, his will directed the disposition of his assets that amounted to US$6 million ($232.2 million today). Of that total, $375,000 was bequeathed to relatives and $250,000 to public institutions (Chicago Art Institute, Chicago Orphan Asylum, Home for the Friendless at Chicago, St. Luke's Hospital, Passavant Memorial Hospital, Chicago Relief and Aid Society, $25,000 each and James Blackstone Memorial Library Association, $100,000). The remainder went to his widow. Blackstone was also a close associate of his cousin, William Eugene Blackstone.

Preceded by None	President of Chicago and Alton Railroad; 1864 – 1899	Succeeded by Samuel Morse Felton Jr.
