= Drake Hotel (Chicago) =

- The Drake Hotel
- U.S. National Register of Historic Places
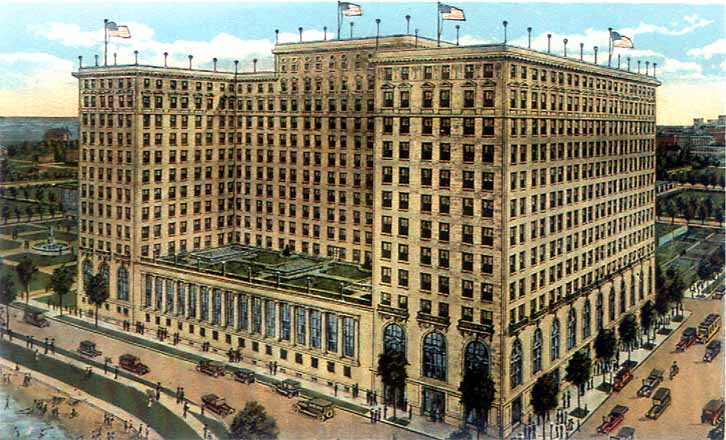
- The newly opened Drake Hotel in a 1920 picture postcard

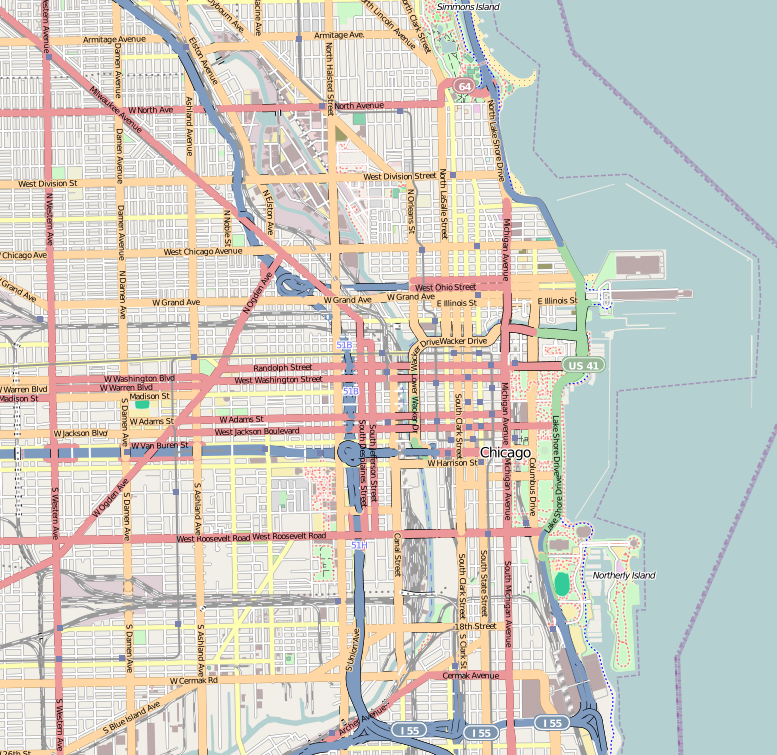
- Location within Central Chicago Location within Illinois Location within the United States
- Location: 140 E. Walton Pl., Chicago, Illinois, U.S.
- Coordinates: 41°54′1.67″N 87°37′27.3″W
- Built: 1920; 106 years ago
- Architects: Benjamin Marshall, Charles Eli Fox
- NRHP reference No.: 80001345
- Added to NRHP: May 8, 1980

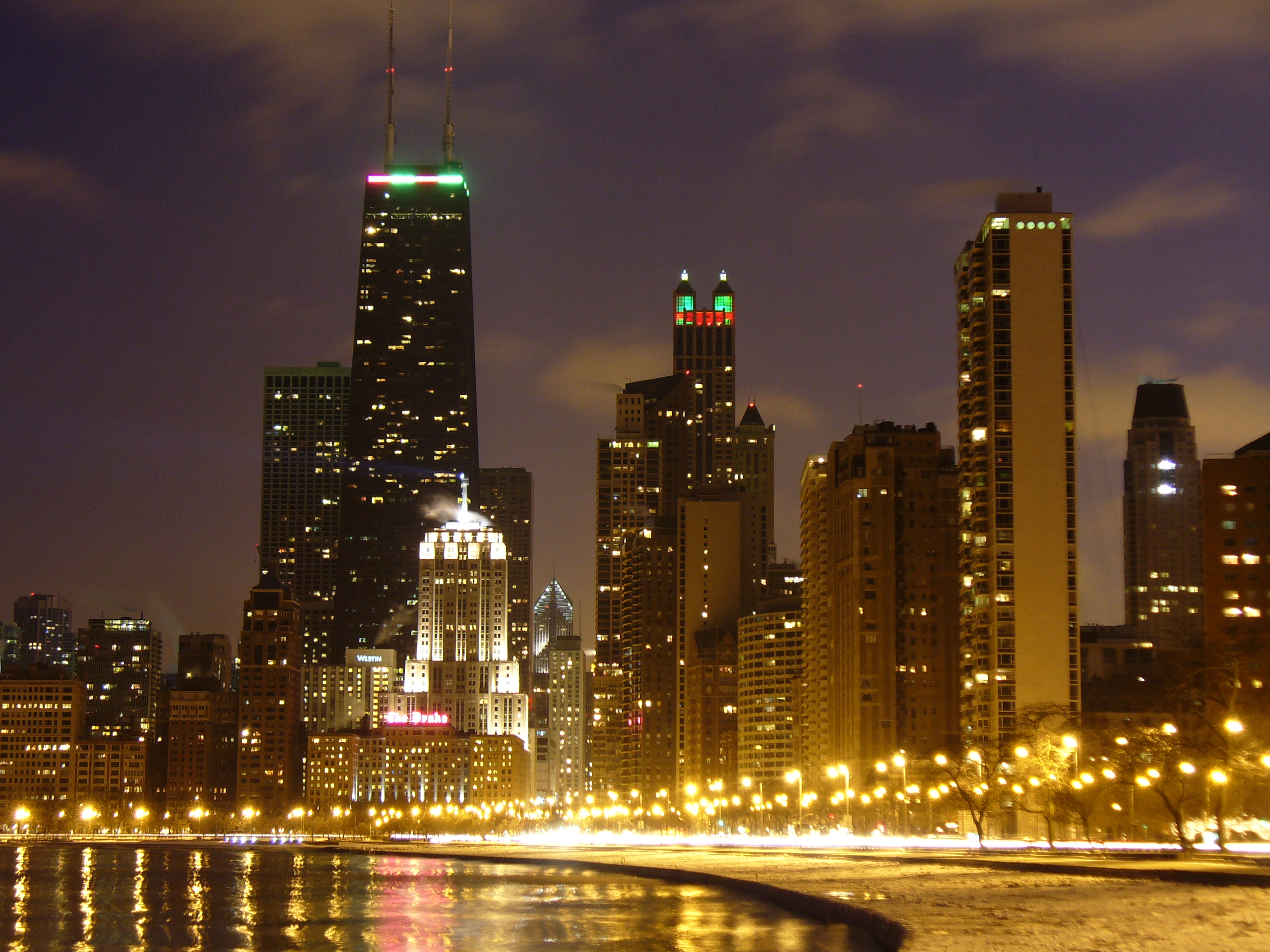
The pink neon sign of The Drake (bottom-center-left)

The Drake, a Hilton Hotel, 140 East Walton Place, Chicago, Illinois, is a luxury, full-service hotel, located downtown on the lake side of Michigan Avenue two blocks north of the John Hancock Center and a block south of Oak Street Beach at the top of the Magnificent Mile. Overlooking Lake Michigan, it was opened in 1920, and soon became one of Chicago's landmark hotels and a longtime rival of the Palmer House.

It has 535 bedrooms (including 74 suites), a six-room Presidential Suite, several restaurants, two large ballrooms, the "Palm Court" (a club-like, secluded lobby, where afternoon tea is served), and Club International (a members-only club introduced in the 1940s). Designed in the Italian Renaissance style by the firm of Marshall and Fox, the hotel's silhouette and sign contribute to the Gold Coast skyline.

== History ==
Second-generation hotel magnates Tracy Drake and John Drake Jnr. acquired the property from the estate of Potter Palmer in 1916. The building was financed by a syndicate of family friends including members of the Palmer, Armour, Swift, and McCormick families and the hotel's architects, Benjamin Marshall and Charles Fox. Including the land, construction, and furnishing, the Drake cost $10 million, which in present-day dollars is roughly $120 million.

At the time of its completion, the Drake provided a transition between the fashionable Gold Coast residential area and the new commercial north Michigan Avenue. The building's Walton Place main entrance avoided the commotion of the commercial thoroughfare and increased vehicular access. The Drake brothers upheld the family reputation as a main focus of social, commercial, and political life in Chicago with its ownership and management of the city's two most prominent hotels as Michigan Avenue bookends. (See Blackstone Hotel.)

The Drake served as the original studios of radio station WGN when it was renamed from WDAP in 1924.

William Drake and his wife Elizabeth lived at the hotel for several years until the family lost the property during the Great Depression.

When Francesco ("Frank 'The Enforcer' Nitti") Nitto headed the Chicago Outfit in the 1930s and early 1940s, he maintained his office for a time in a suite of rooms. From the 1950s through the 1980s, the Drake Hotel maintained its status, continuing to attract several notable guests, and became even more prominent as the Magnificent Mile further developed and the residential Gold Coast saw parts of it, primarily Oak Street, developed with luxury boutiques, fine jewelry stores, and spas. Such development allowed the centrally located Drake Hotel to act as a connection of sorts for the burgeoning, prestigious areas.

Hilton International assumed operation of the hotel in 1980, under their Vista International Hotels brand. Hilton International purchased the property outright in 1996. They renovated the hotel from 1998 to 2003, at a cost of $45 million. In 2005 and 2006, owners added a fitness center, executive conference center, and new furnishings in all the guest rooms at a cost of $15 million. In 2005, Hilton Hotels Corporation acquired Hilton International, and The Drake became part of the Hilton Hotels Corporation and The Hilton Family of Hotels.

== Notable visitors ==
The Drake has been frequented by many heads of state, assorted celebrities, international personalities, and members of the European aristocracy (some as long-term residents) since opening in 1920. Notable guests included Winston Churchill, Eleanor Roosevelt, U.S. presidents Herbert Hoover, Dwight Eisenhower, Gerald Ford and Ronald Reagan. Prince Charles and Diana, Princess of Wales (albeit separately), Elizabeth Taylor, Judy Garland, Hugh Hefner, Walt Disney, Frank Sinatra, Dean Martin, Charles Lindbergh, the Marchese and Marchesa Chiaramonte-Ragusa. Prince Felix Yusupov, Ukrainian President Viktor Yushchenko, King Hussein of Jordan, Indian Prime Minister Jawaharlal Nehru, and Julia Roberts. Joe DiMaggio and Marilyn Monroe carved their initials into the wooden bar of the Cape Cod Room during a visit; this can still be seen today. Diana, Princess of Wales, stayed at the Drake in 1996 during her only visit to Chicago, a year before her death.

== Urban legends ==
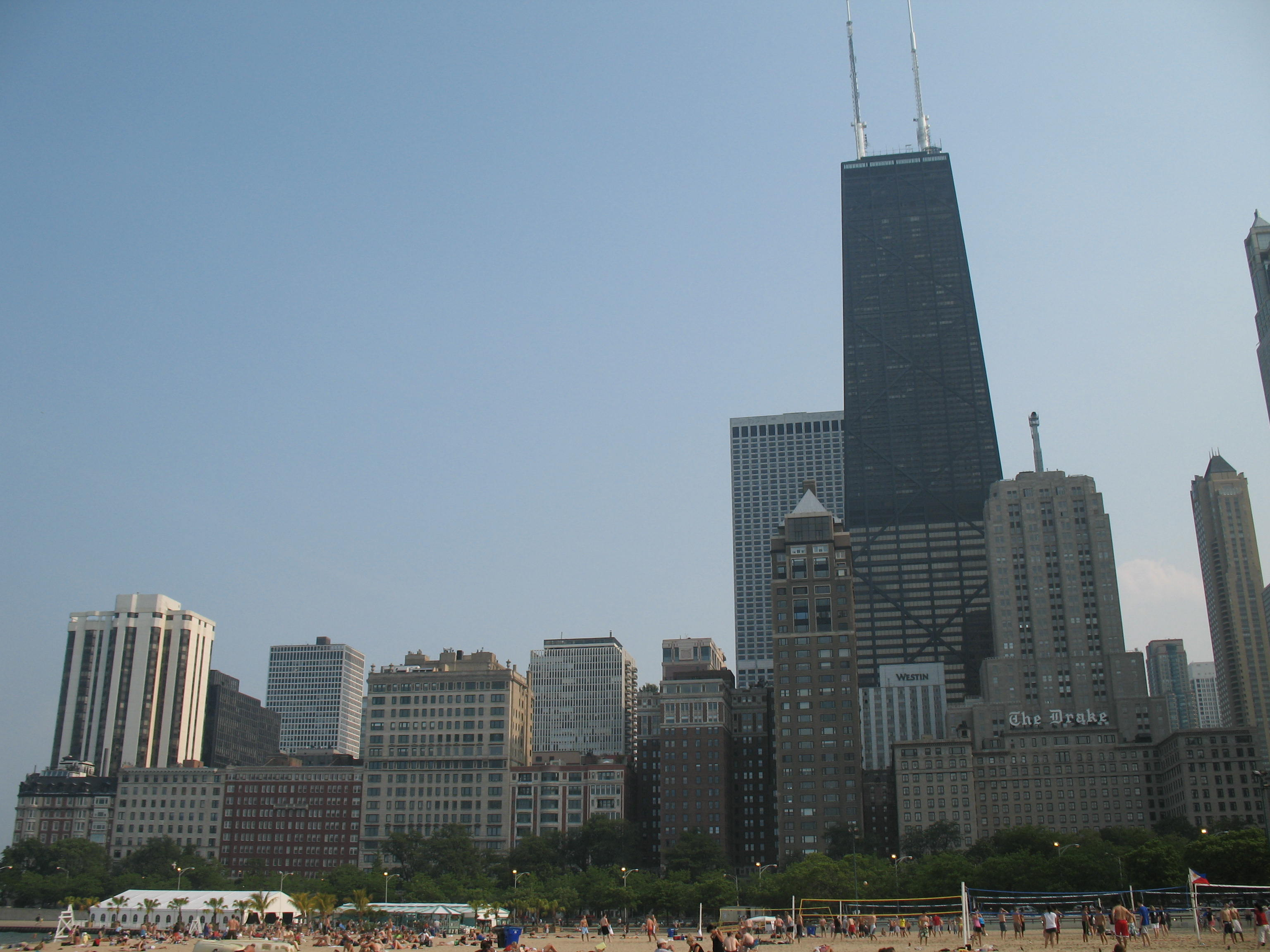
Drake Hotel (lower right) and the East Lake Shore Drive District from Oak Street Beach

According to local legend, John Drake (1826–1895), the father of this hotel's founders, was standing with a hotel owner watching the Great Chicago Fire of 1871. The owner, seeing his hotel threatened by the flames, offered to sell it for any price. Drake noticed that the wind direction was changing and made an offer and so founded the Drake Hotel. If this were true it would have occurred 49 years before the hotel's founding. The story is possibly confused with the interim New Tremont House purchase by John Drake, at the time of the Great Fire.

Additionally, the hotel features in several ghost stories.

== In popular culture ==
Scenes from the movies Risky Business, My Best Friend's Wedding, Hero, What Women Want, Continental Divide, Flags of Our Fathers, Wicker Park, Mission: Impossible, and Carol were filmed or at least set at the hotel. Mission: Impossible mentions Jon Voight's character Jim Phelps as having stayed there shortly before the events of the film. (Note: As soon as Phelps mentions this fact, all four people listening to him - who are actually part of his team - exclaim in appreciation. They even mention the excellent services the hotel offers, namely 24-hour room service, chauffeured cars and a fat expense account) Agent X, season one, partially revolves around photos the Vice President (Sharon Stone) receives of her deceased husband having an affair at the Drake. In an episode of Curb Your Enthusiasm, a character falsely claims that the Cobb salad was invented at the hotel. The Family Matters episode "Dream Date" has Laura Winslow and Steve Urkel attending their senior prom at the Drake Hotel.

== Afternoon tea ==
Visitors to Chicago are often drawn to afternoon tea, a tradition that dates back to 1840. The Empress of Japan, Princess Diana, and Queen Elizabeth II have all participated in the custom. Tea is held in the Palm Court, which is decorated entirely in white. The hotel has a specialty custom-made "Palm Court" blend, which is made out of four teas: Indian Assam, chocolate notes from Chinese Keemun, Ceylon, and a Formosa Oolong. Live harp music occurs Wednesday through Sunday. In 2013, USA Today ranked the Drake Hotel as one of the best hotels for afternoon tea in the country.

== Retail tenants ==
The Drake, a Hilton Hotel has Chanel, Georg Jensen, and Van Cleef & Arpels as retail tenants, all of which have a street-level presence on the Magnificent Mile.
