= Crane Co Building of Memphis =

Coordinates: 35.145103°N 90.047330°W

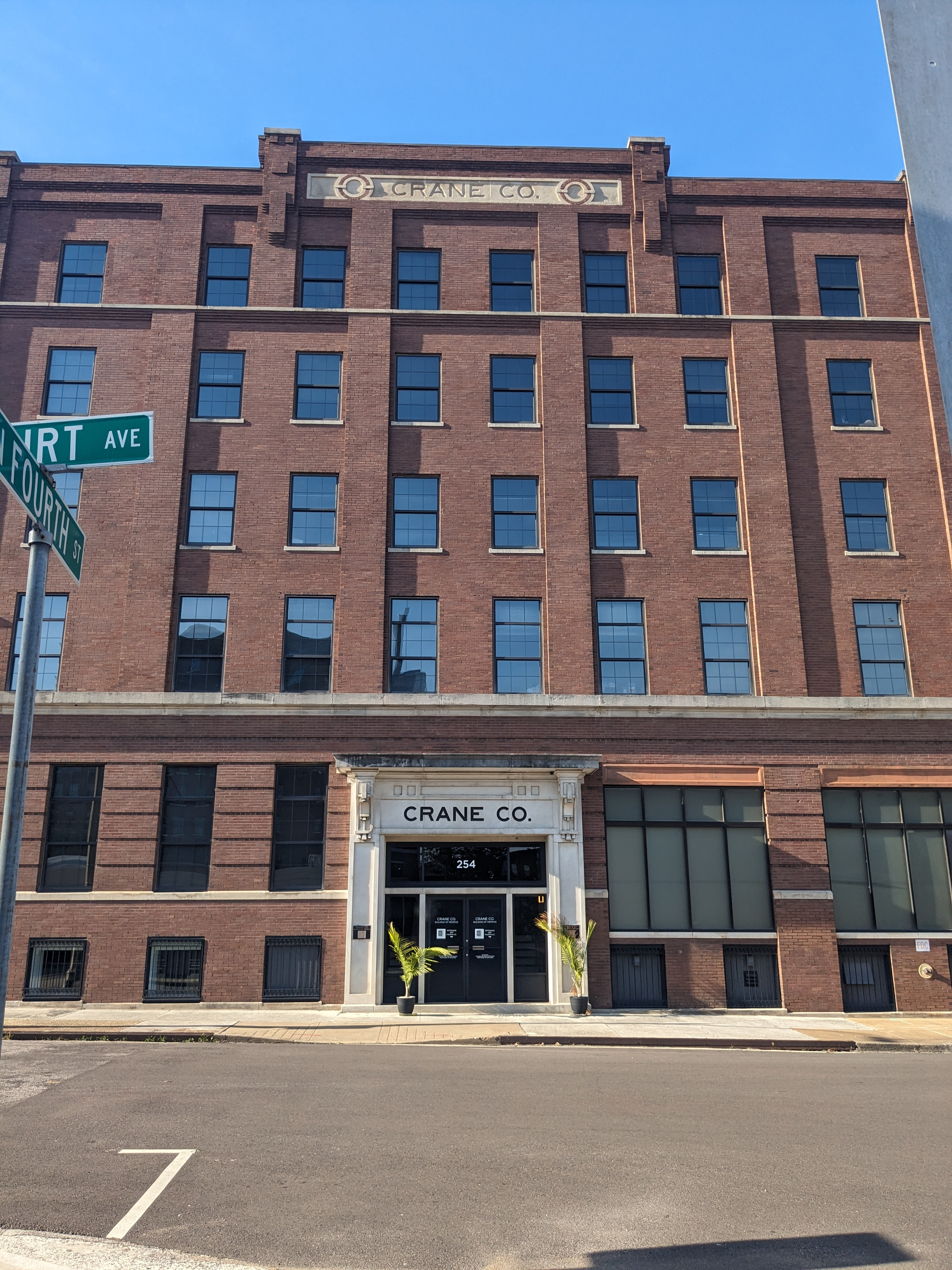
Crane Co Building of Memphis

The Crane Co Building of Memphis is a five-story plus basement fireproof building consisting of 52,000 sf constructed in 1906. It is located at 254 Court Ave. Memphis, TN 38103. The building was built as the regional headquarters of the Crane Co. for the sales of residential and commercial plumbing supplies. The building measures 87 feet by 100 feet and has "CRANE CO" carved along the roofline. It was used by Crane Co until 1982.
