= Historic Michigan Boulevard District =

Historic district of Chicago, Illinois

- Michigan Avenue
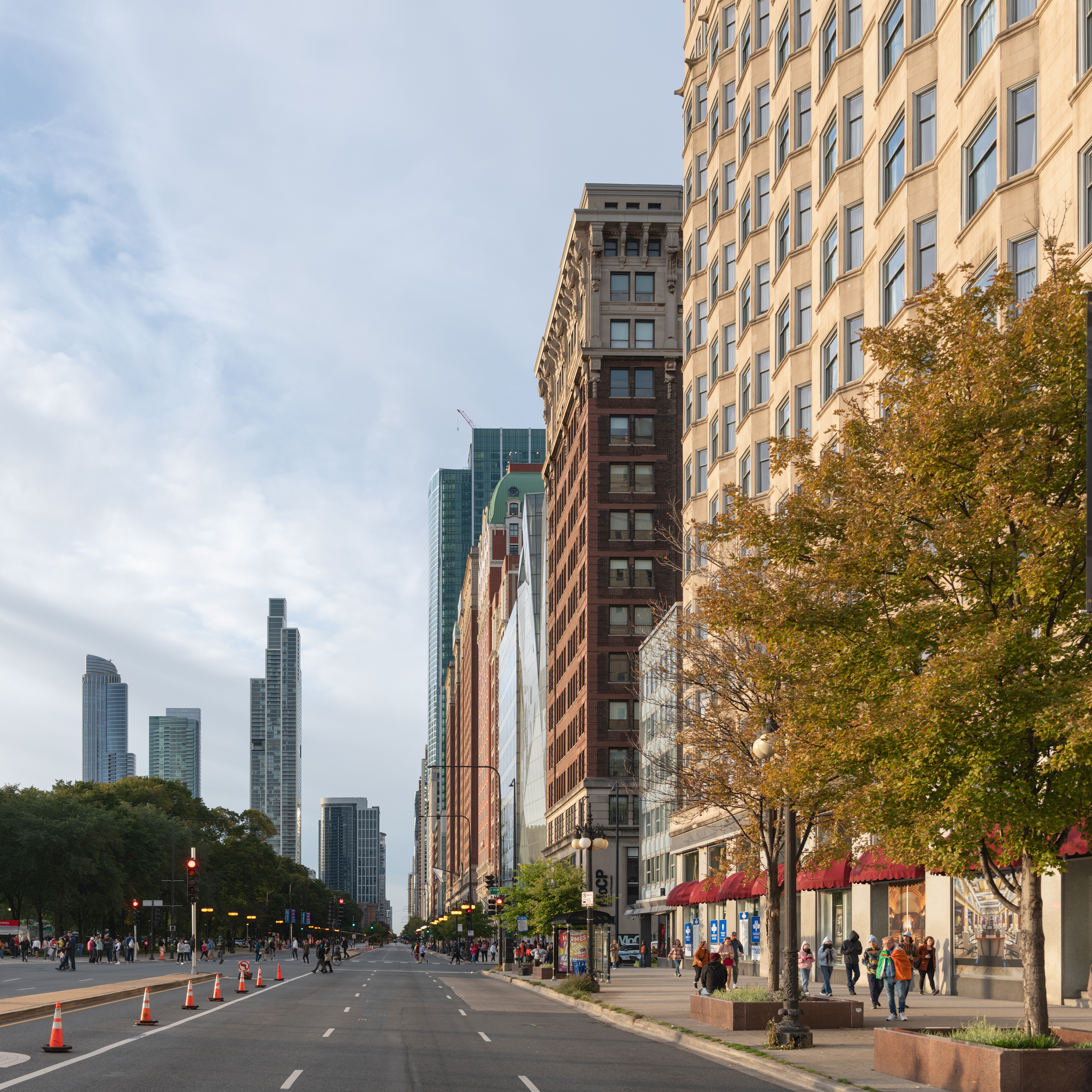
- Interactive map of Historic Michigan Boulevard District
- Maintained by: Chicago Department of Streets and Sanitation
- Length: 1.2 mi (1.9 km)
- Coordinates: 41.8757°N 87.6244°W
- South end: Roosevelt Road or 11th Street
- Major junctions: Ida B. Wells Drive to I-290; Historic US 66 (Jackson Boulevard); Historic US 66 (Adams Street)
- North end: Randolph Street

The Historic Michigan Boulevard District is a historic district in the Loop community area of Chicago in Cook County, Illinois, United States encompassing Michigan Avenue between 11th (1100 south in the street numbering system) or Roosevelt Road (1200 south), depending on the source, and Randolph Streets (150 north) and named after the nearby Lake Michigan. It was designated a Chicago Landmark on February 27, 2002. The district includes numerous significant buildings on Michigan Avenue facing Grant Park. This section of Michigan Avenue includes the eastern terminus of U.S. Route 66. The district is one of the world's best known one-sided streets rivalling Fifth Avenue in New York City and Edinburgh's Princes Street. It lies immediately south of the Michigan–Wacker Historic District and east of the Loop Retail Historic District.

== History ==
Michigan Avenue is named after Lake Michigan, which it once ran alongside at 100 east in the city's street numbering system until land reclamation for Grant Park (then Lake Park) pushed the shoreline east. The one-sided street feature is due in large part to the legal battles of Aaron Montgomery Ward with the city over cleaning up the park and removing most of the structures in it. Ward opposed the development of Grant Park with public buildings along the lakefront except for the Art Institute of Chicago Building. Eventually, Ward's ideas were adopted by Daniel Burnham in his Plan of Chicago, which called for "insured light, air, and an agreeable outlook" along the Grant Park street frontage. The preservation of the lakefront view has inspired architects to create an architectural cornucopia of designs along the "streetwall".

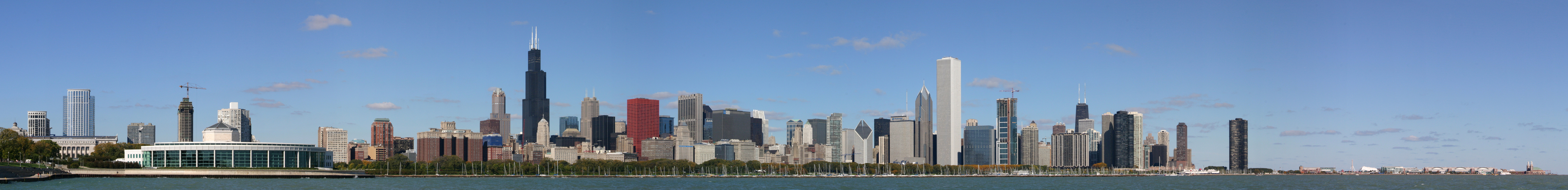
The district begins immediately south of the Smurfit-Stone Building at Randolph Street on the north side of the Chicago Cultural Center. (2006)

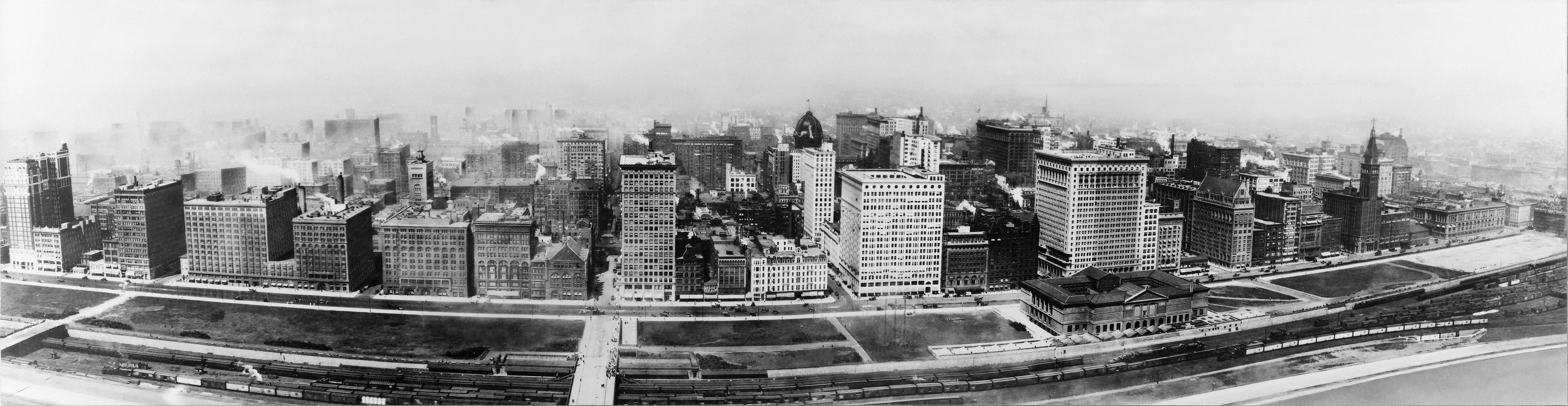
Aerial view of Michigan Avenue in 1911.

At no point is Michigan Avenue currently called Michigan Boulevard, but prior to the Great Chicago Fire of 1871, the street was officially known as Michigan Boulevard and often referred to as "Boul Mich". As recently as the 1920s, North Michigan Avenue (especially the Magnificent Mile) was referred to as "Upper Boul Mich". Paris' Boulevard Saint-Michel is the original Boul Mich.

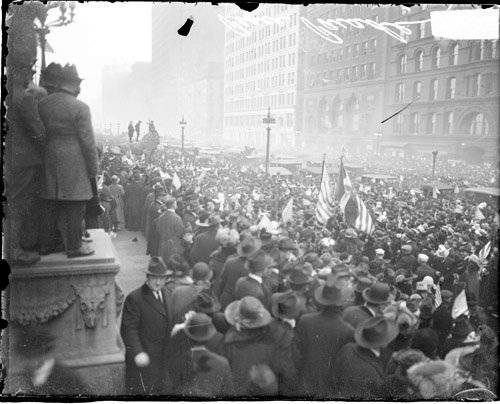
Armistice Day parade 1918

The district has changed over the years as various architectural designs have evolved to complement it. The boulevard was widened between 1909 and 1910 causing the Art Institute of Chicago Building to have to move the lions guarding its entrance back 12 feet. At that time, the Jackson Boulevard and Michigan Avenue intersection (the end of route 66) was known as "route center". Also at that time, the boulevard had no streets crossing it and extending eastward, and thus, the Jackson intersection was a T intersection. This was still true in 1920 when the Michigan Avenue Bridge opened and increased traffic by connecting this boulevard with the Magnificent Mile and the community north of the Chicago River a quarter mile to the north of this district. The Fountain of the Great Lakes (installed in 1913) was highly visible from route center. Today, four streets cross Michigan Avenue within the district (in addition to its northern and southern endpoints at crossing streets). Two of the four change names as they cross Michigan: eastbound East Monroe Street (100 south) becomes East Monroe Drive; and eastbound East Jackson Boulevard (300 south) becomes East Jackson Drive. Two-way East Ida B. Wells Drive (500 south) and East Balbo Drive (700 south) do not change names as they cross Michigan Ave.

== Today ==
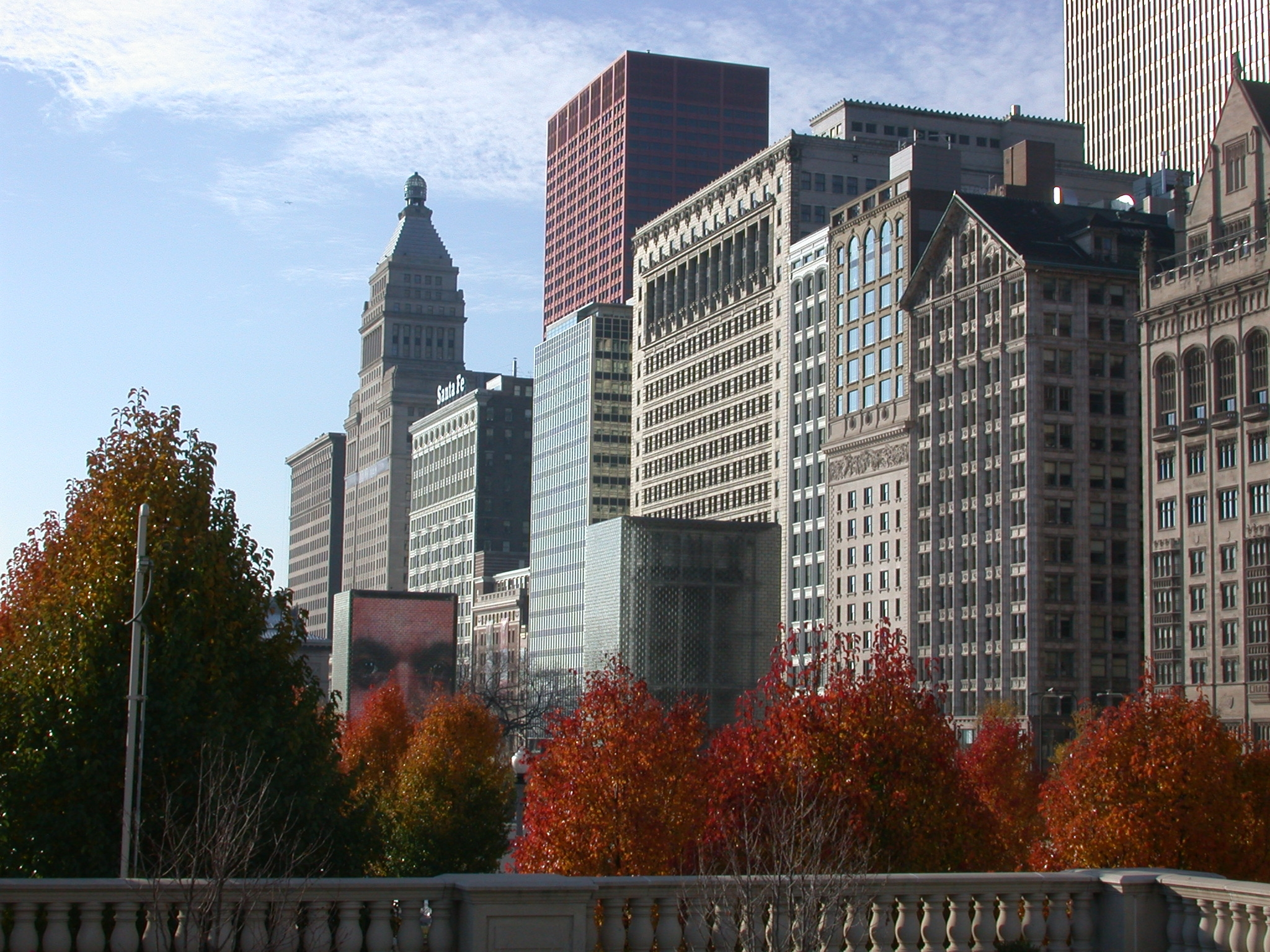
Historic Michigan Avenue from Millennium Park

Today the only building on the eastern side of Michigan Avenue in the Historic District hosts the Art Institute of Chicago. However, several interesting structures have been added to the northern part of the eastern side of Michigan Avenue in Millennium Park such as Crown Fountain and McCormick Tribune Plaza. The current "End Historic US 66" marker is now located along Michigan Avenue in this district to mark the official end of U.S. Route 66 in Illinois, but this and several others traverse Michigan Avenue within Grant Park because landfill has created two blocks of real estate between Michigan Avenue and the Lake Michigan shoreline. Also, the Fountain was relocated and is no longer easily seen from Michigan Avenue.

Among the current issues today is the trend to redevelop properties by constructing grand towers behind the facades of historic structures along Michigan and Wabash Avenues (the parallel street one block to the west). The most recent examples of this have been The Heritage at Millennium Park, Legacy at Millennium Park and the 80-story tower proposed as part of the YWCA building redevelopment at 830 S. Michigan Avenue. This trend is now endangering the Chicago Athletic Association Annex, which has been proposed for demolition to make way for a fifty- to eighty-story condominium tower across from Millennium Park. As a result, the building is listed first on the 2006-07 Chicagoland Watch List of the Landmarks Preservation Council of Illinois. On the other hand, many were concerned that the landmark district designation would stagnate development of the area. The purpose of the designation was to "keep the architecture there and encourage architecture like it and keep the wall of the park," according to the City's Department of Planning and Development. Thus, redevelopment for new uses will be part of the ongoing concerns for the neighborhood. Thus, buildings being renovated for condos and dormitories is a part of the present and future for the district.

== Buildings in the District ==
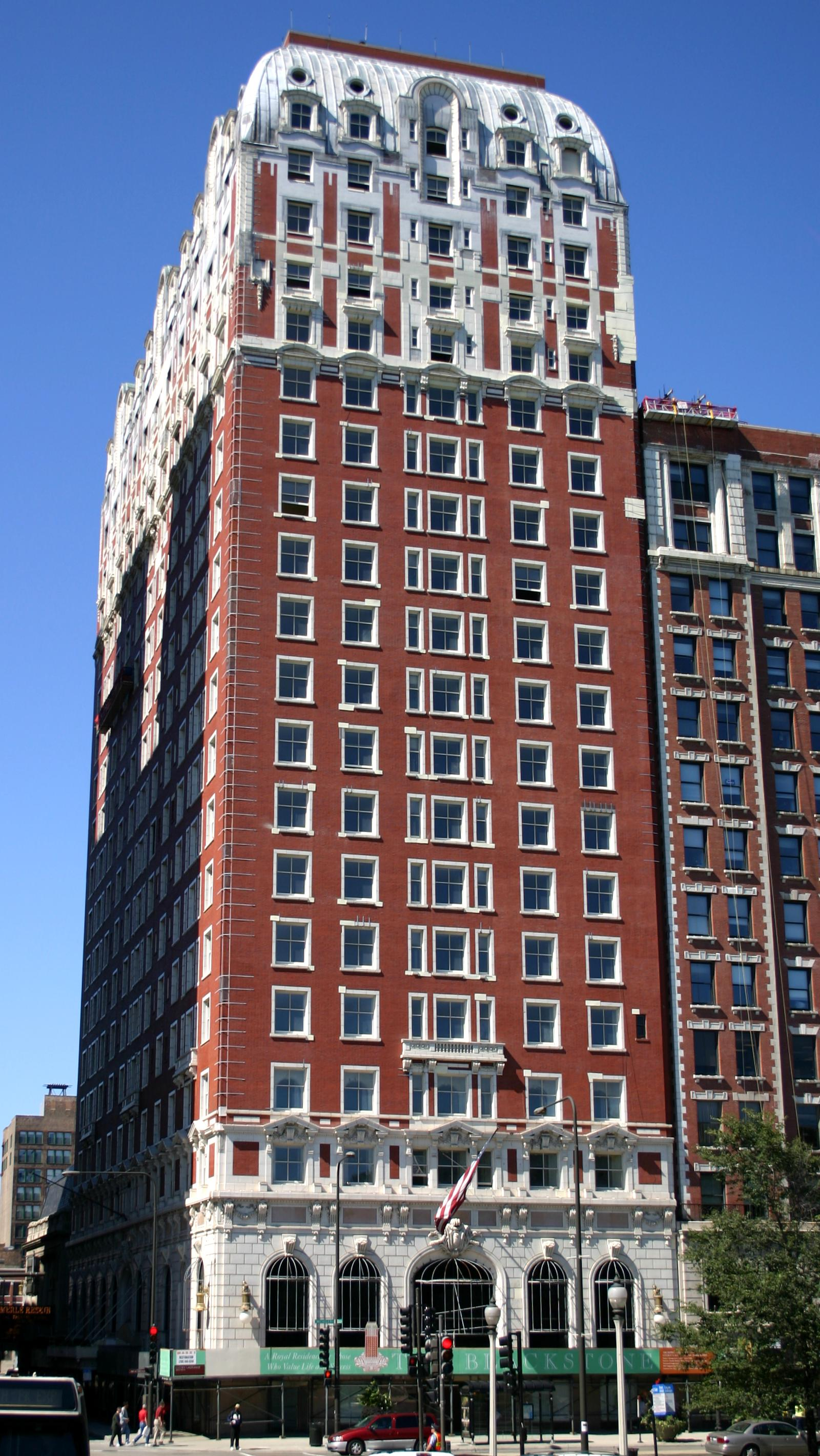
The Blackstone Hotel has hosted almost every 20th century U.S. president.

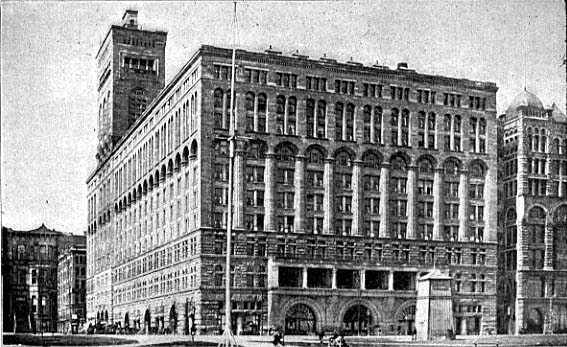
The Auditorium Building was the first home of the Chicago Civic Opera and the Chicago Symphony Orchestra.

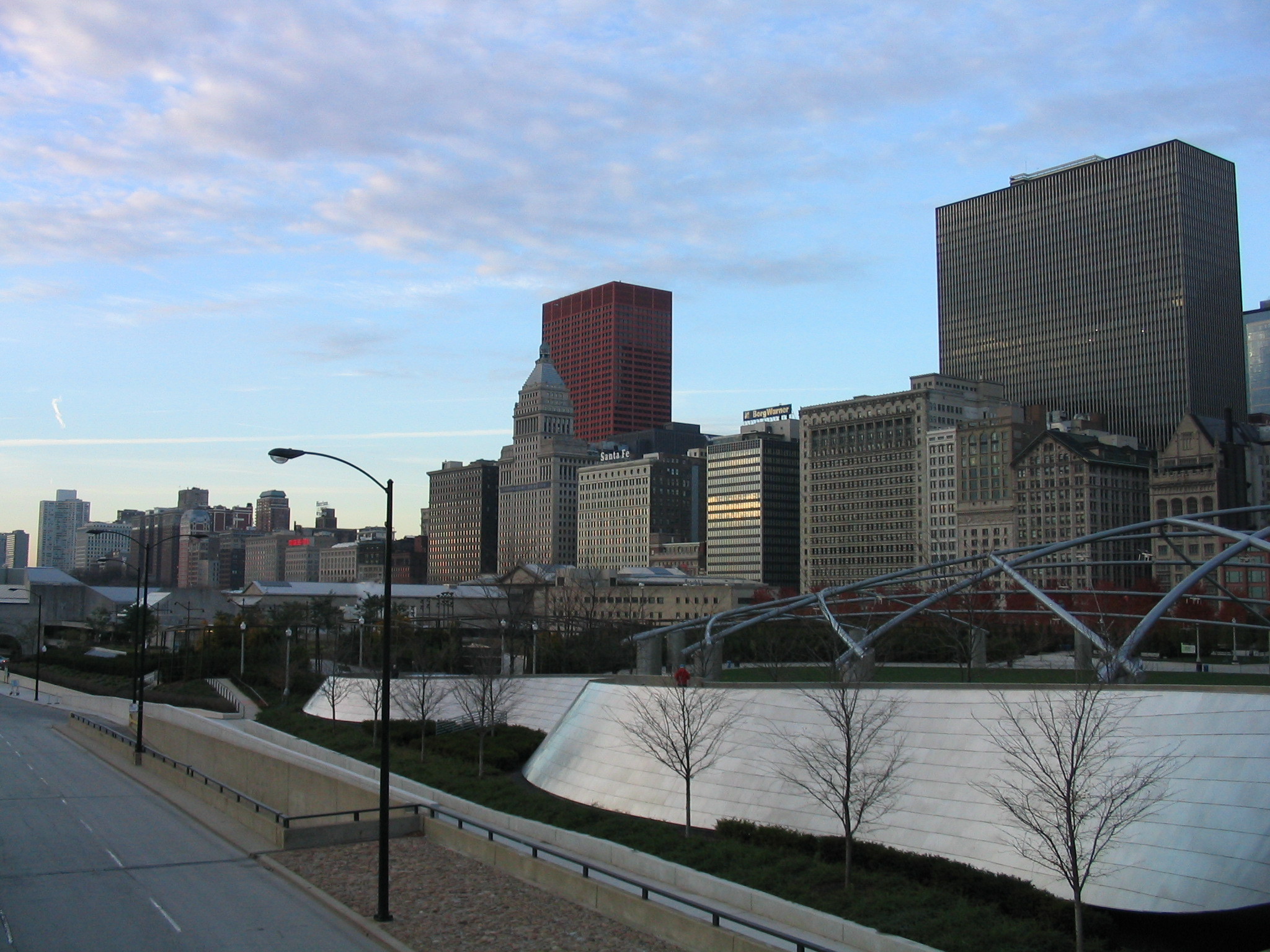
view from BP Pedestrian Bridge overpass

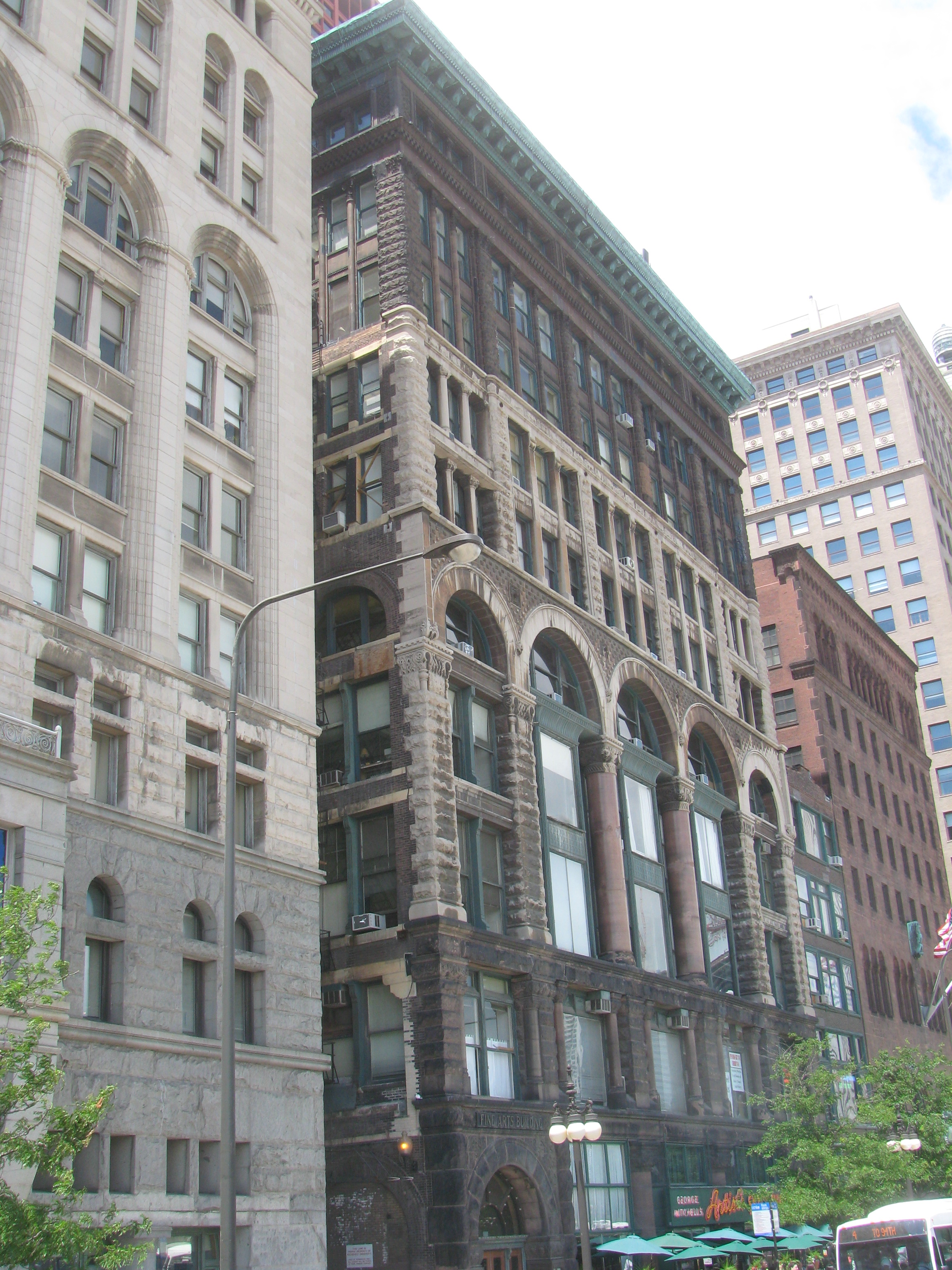
Fine Arts Building

The Blackstone has become part of Chicago's history as the city that has hosted more United States presidential nominating conventions (26) than any other two American cities, The Blackstone Hotel has hosted almost every 20th century U.S. president, and it has contributed the phrase "in a smoke-filled room" to American political parlance.

The Chicago Symphony Orchestra debuted on October 16, 1891, and made its home in the Auditorium Theatre until moving to Orchestra Hall in 1904. Theodore Roosevelt gave his famous Bull Moose speech in 1912 at the Auditorium and was nominated for President of the United States by the independent National Progressive Party. The Auditorium has hosted Jimi Hendrix, The Who, the Grateful Dead, and many others. The Auditorium Building is considered a milestone in the development of modern architecture.

The Chicago Cultural Center serves as the city's official reception venue where the Mayor of Chicago has welcomed Presidents and royalty, diplomats and community leaders. According to Crain's Chicago Business, the Chicago Cultural Center was the eighth most-visited cultural institution in the Chicago area in 2004, with 767,000 visitors. The interior includes ornate mosaics, marbles, bronze, and stained-glass domes designed by the Tiffany Glass and Decorating Company.

The Art Institute of Chicago is a fine-art museum well known for its Impressionist and American art.

North to south:

Name	Street Address	Architect	Status
Chicago Cultural Center (former central library)	78 E. Washington Street	Shepley, Rutan and Coolidge	CL, NRHP
Michigan Boulevard Building	30 N. Michigan Avenue	Jarvis Hunt	
6 North Michigan (a.k.a. Montgomery Ward Building)	6 N. Michigan Avenue	Holabird & Roche, Schmidt, Garden & Martin	
Willoughby Tower	8 S. Michigan Avenue	Samuel N. Crowen & Associates	
Chicago Athletic Association	12 S. Michigan Avenue	Henry Ives Cobb	
Gage Building	18 S. Michigan Avenue	Louis H. Sullivan, Holabird & Roche	CL, NRHP
The University Club of Chicago	76 E. Monroe Street	Holabird & Roche	
The Boulevard (Monroe Building)	104 S. Michigan Avenue	Holabird & Roche	
Wolberg Hall	112 S. Michigan Avenue	Barnett, Haynes & Barnett, Swann & Weiskopf	
Lake View Building	116 S. Michigan Avenue	Jenney, Mundie & Jensen	NRHP
Peoples Gas Building	122 S. Michigan Avenue	D. H. Burnham & Company	NRHP
Borg-Warner Building	200 S. Michigan Avenue	A. Epstein and Sons International, Inc., George A. Fuller Company	
Orchestra Hall	220 S. Michigan Avenue	Daniel Burnham	NHL, NRHP, CL
Santa Fe Building (formerly Railway Exchange Building)	224 S. Michigan Avenue	D. H. Burnham & Company	NRHP
Metropolitan Tower (formerly Straus Building)	310 S. Michigan Avenue	Graham, Anderson, Probst & White	
Buckingham Building (a.k.a. Socony-Vacuum Building)	59-67 E. Van Buren Street	Holabird & Root	NRHP
McCormick Building	332 S. Michigan Avenue	Holabird & Roche	
Fine Arts Building	410 S. Michigan Avenue	Solon S. Beman	NRHP
Auditorium Building	430 S. Michigan Avenue	Adler & Sullivan	CL, NHL, NRHP
Congress Hotel Addition	520 S. Michigan Avenue	Holabird & Roche	
Columbia College Chicago	600 S. Michigan Avenue	Christian A. Eckstorm	
Spertus Institute for Jewish Learning and Leadership	610 S. Michigan Avenue	Krueck and Sexton Architects	
Torco Building	624 S. Michigan Avenue	Christian A. Eckstorm, Alfred S. Alschuler	
The Blackstone	636 S. Michigan Avenue	Marshall and Fox	CL, NRHP
Chicago Hilton & Towers	720 S. Michigan Avenue	Holabird & Roche	
Essex Inn	800 S. Michigan Avenue	A. Epstein and Sons International, Inc.	
Crane Company Building	836 S. Michigan Avenue	Holabird and Roche	NRHP
888 South Michigan	888 S. Michigan Avenue	Holabird & Roche	
Michigan Avenue Lofts	910 S. Michigan Avenue	Graham, Anderson, Probst & White, Marshall and Fox	

Statuses

CL-Chicago Landmark
NHL-National Historic Landmark
NRHP-National Register of Historic Places
