= John Drake (1872–1964) =

American developer and hotelier

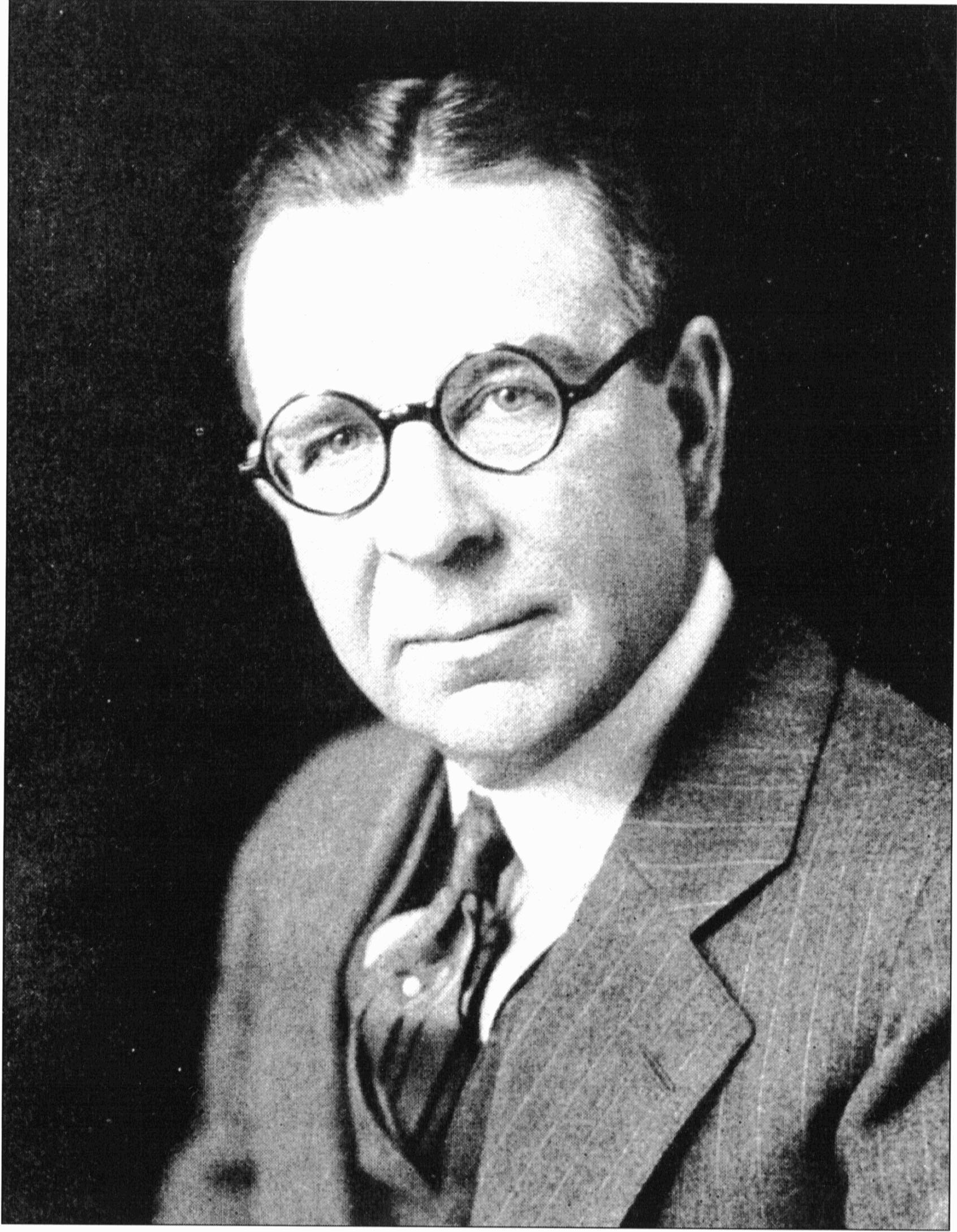
- Drake prior to 1920
- Born: John Burroughs Drake; 1872
- Died: 1964 (aged 91-92); Tampa, Florida, US
- Occupation(s): Hotelier (developer and proprietor)
- Family: John Drake Snr. (father)

John Burroughs Drake Jnr. (1872–1964) and his brother Tracy Drake were the developers and proprietors of the Chicago hotels, the Blackstone Hotel and Drake Hotel, he was the son of John Drake Snr., who was also a hotelier.

The brothers acquired the property for the Drake Hotel from the estate of Potter Palmer in 1916 after he gave up on the idea of building a hotel himself. He died in 1964 in Tampa, Florida.
