= Smoke-filled room =

U.S. political jargon for a secret meeting of powerful people

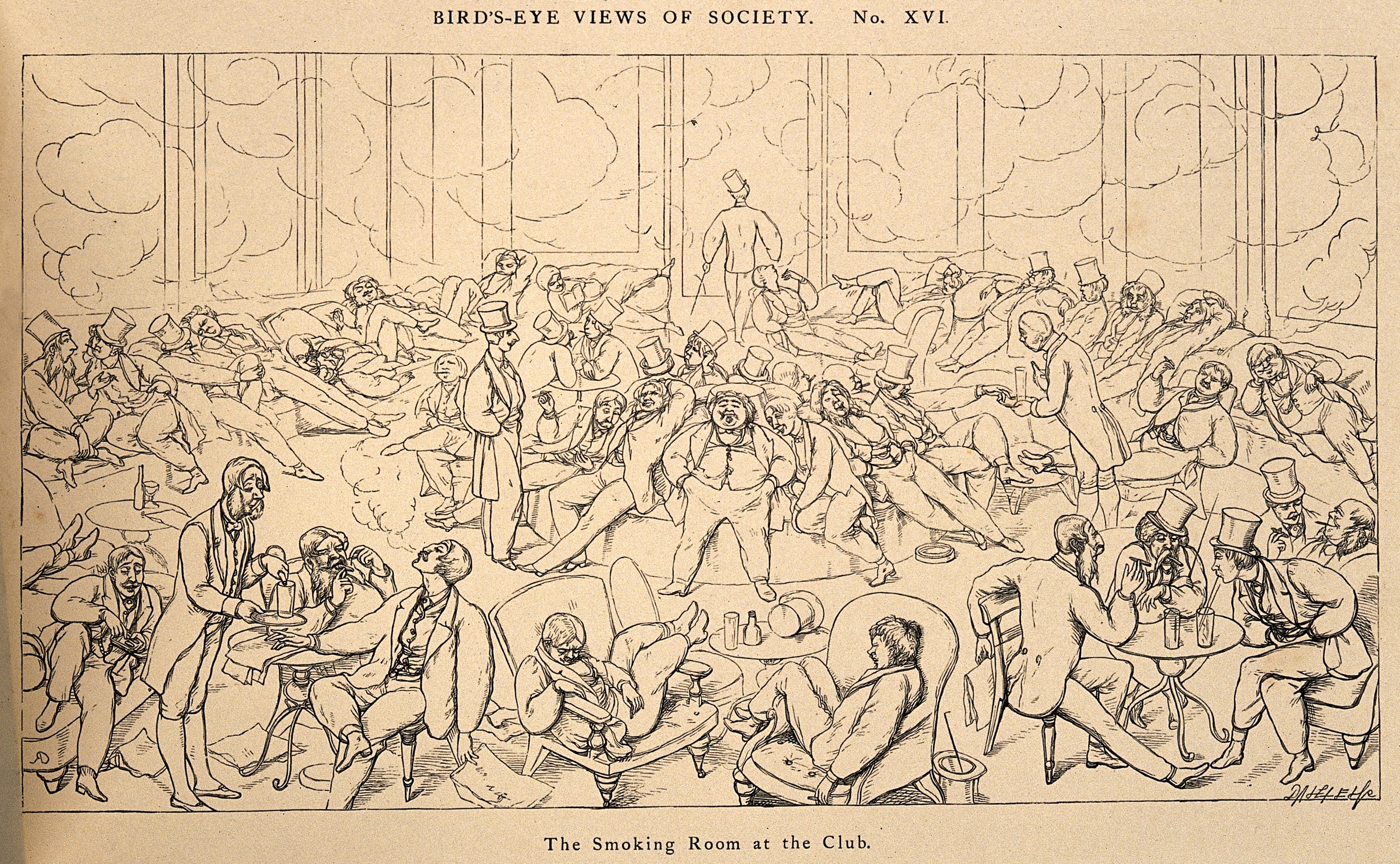
A late 19th-century view of the smoking room in a gentlemen's club. The three men at lower right are engaged in earnest discussion.

In U.S. political jargon, a smoke-filled room (sometimes called a smoke-filled back room) is an exclusive, sometimes secret political gathering or round-table-style decision-making process. The phrase is generally used to suggest an inner circle of power brokers, a cabal of the powerful or well-connected acting to make decisions separate from—and without regard for—the will of the larger group.

An early example of a smoke-filled room is the Boston Caucus. A report of a 1763 meeting of this group said, "selectmen, assessors, collectors, fire-wards and representatives are regularly chosen [there] before they are chosen in the town ... There they smoke tobacco till you cannot see from one end of the garret to the other."

The origin of the term was in a report by Raymond Clapper of United Press, describing rumors of the process by which Warren G. Harding was nominated at the 1920 Republican National Convention as the party's candidate for the presidential election. After many indecisive votes, Harding, a relatively minor candidate who was the junior senator from Ohio was, legend has it, chosen as a compromise candidate by Republican power-brokers in a private meeting at the Blackstone Hotel in Chicago after the convention had deadlocked, though not as a complacent bystander as has often been claimed. In doing so, he surpassed the three Republican front runners, General Leonard Wood, Governor Frank O. Lowden, and Senator Hiram W. Johnson. The fact that before the convention Harding's potential was considered negligible yet he was able to emerge victorious gave birth to the murky and suspicious implications of this term.

== See also ==
- Closed session
- Conspiracy
- Gray eminence
- Secret society
- Star Chamber
- Old boy network
