= Crane Building (Des Moines, Iowa) =

- U.S. National Register of Historic Places
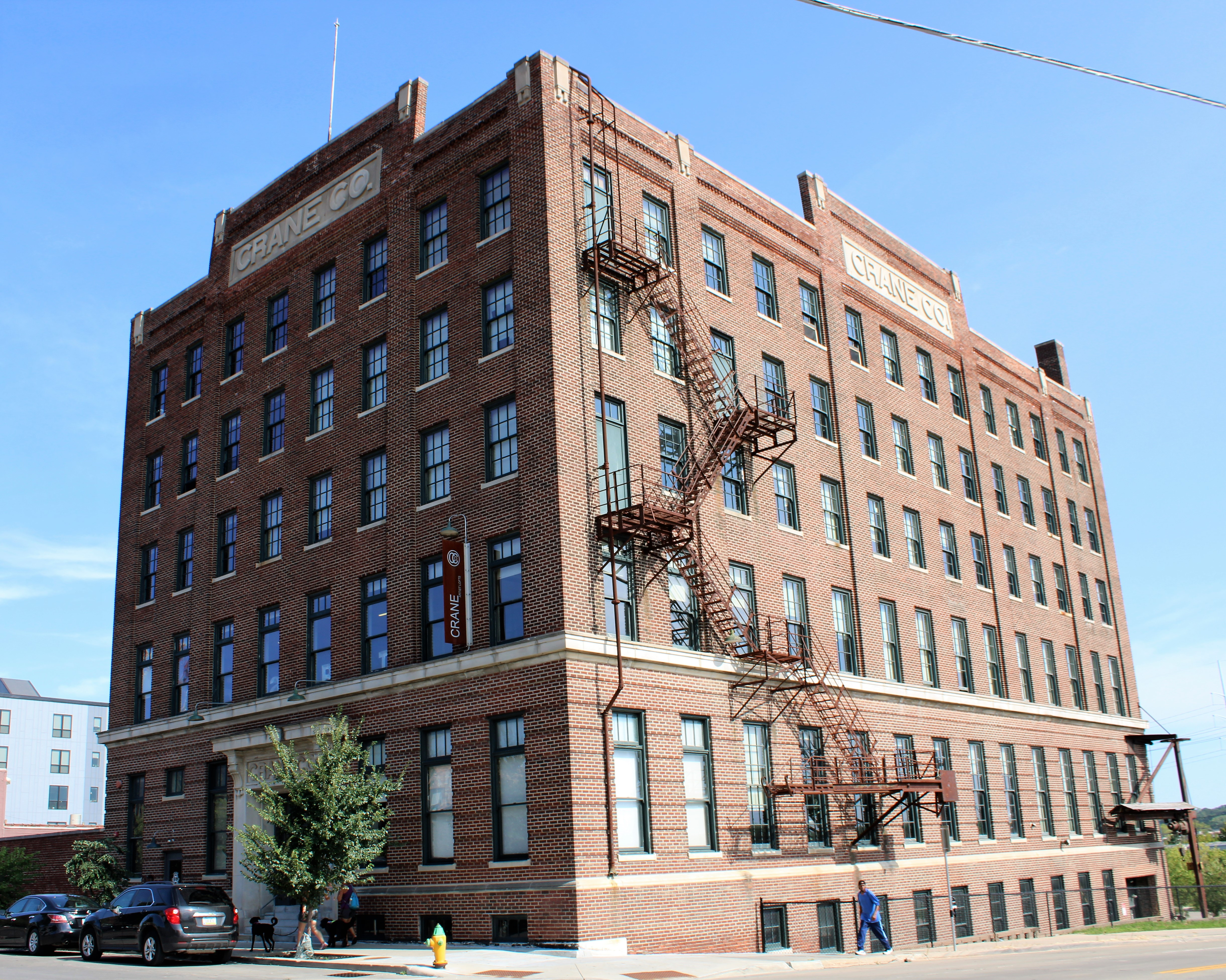

- Location within Iowa Location within the United States
- Location: 1440 Walnut; Des Moines, Iowa
- Coordinates: 41°34′59.7″N 93°38′9.3″W
- Area: less than one acre
- Built: 1916
- Built by: Charles Weitz
- Architect: Sawyer and Watrous
- Architectural style: Early Commercial; Chicago
- NRHP reference No.: 01000914
- Added to NRHP: August 30, 2001

The Crane Building, also known as C.E. Erickson Co., in Des Moines, Iowa, United States. Crane Company was a plumbing and heating supplier and manufacturer that had this six-story manufacturing facility built in 1916. It was designed by the Des Moines architectural firm of Sawyer and Watrous. It is a utilitarian structure that is significant for its "thoughtful design" that utilizes elements of the Chicago School and a refined style. It was listed on the National Register of Historic Places in 2001. In 2013, the vacant building was renovated into 36 lofts targeted at artisans and costing 8 million dollars.
