= Crane Company Building (North Carolina) =

Historic building in North Carolina, US

- U.S. National Register of Historic Places
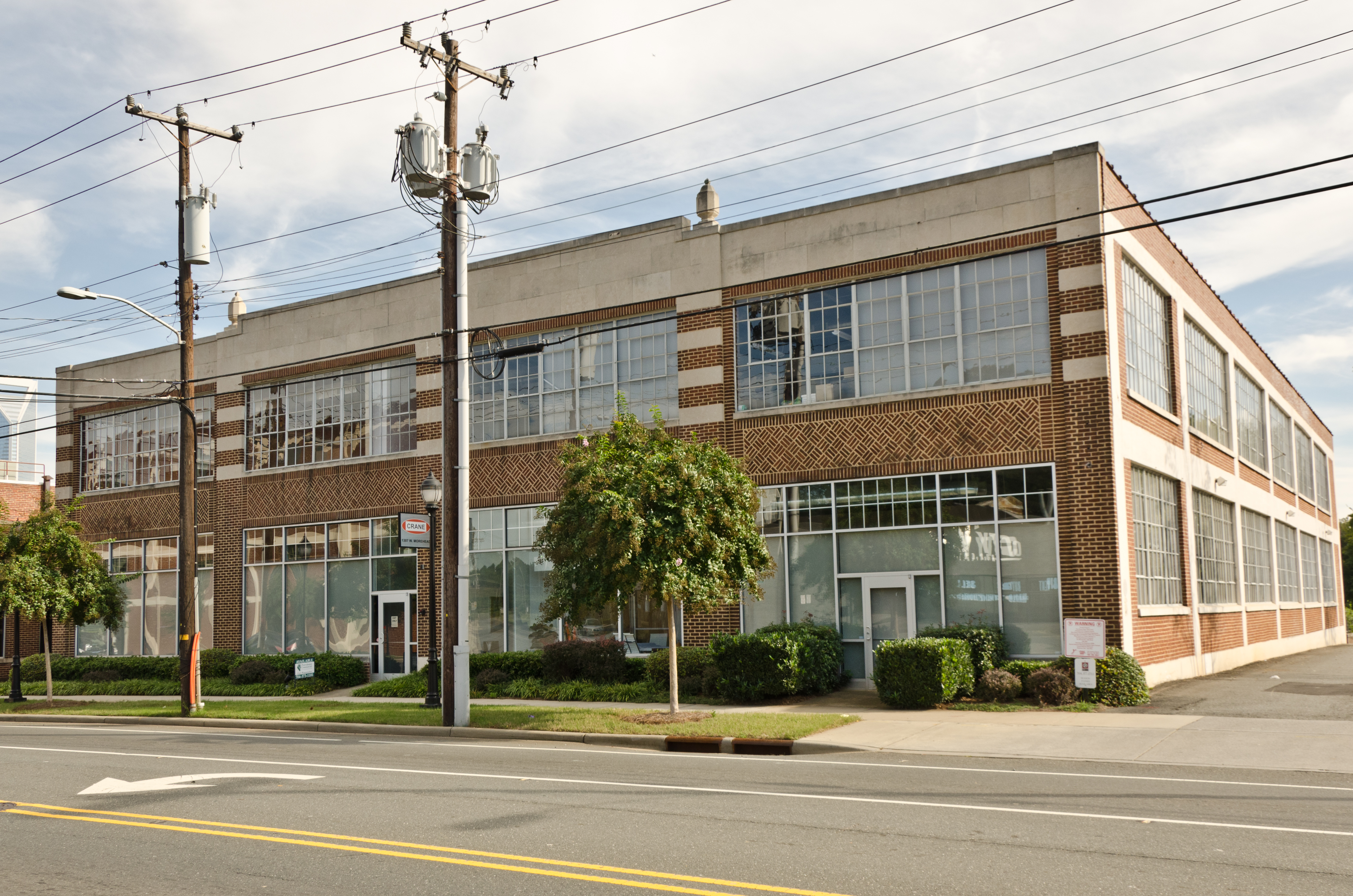
- Crane Company Building (Former), September 2014

- Location within North Carolina Location within the United States
- Location: 1307 W. Morehead St., Charlotte, North Carolina
- Coordinates: 35°13′42″N 80°51′50″W
- Area: 0.4 acres (0.16 ha)
- Built: 1928
- Architect: The Auchter Company
- Architectural style: Late 19th And Early 20th Century American Movements
- NRHP reference No.: 01000423
- Added to NRHP: May 8, 2001

Crane Company Building is a historic warehouse building located at Charlotte, Mecklenburg County, North Carolina. It was built in 1928, and is a two-story, reinforced concrete building. The building has a flat roof with parapet, brick curtain walls and steel window frames and stairs.

It was added to the National Register of Historic Places in 2001.
