= Crane Company Building (Chicago) =

Building in Chicago, Illinois

- U.S. National Register of Historic Places
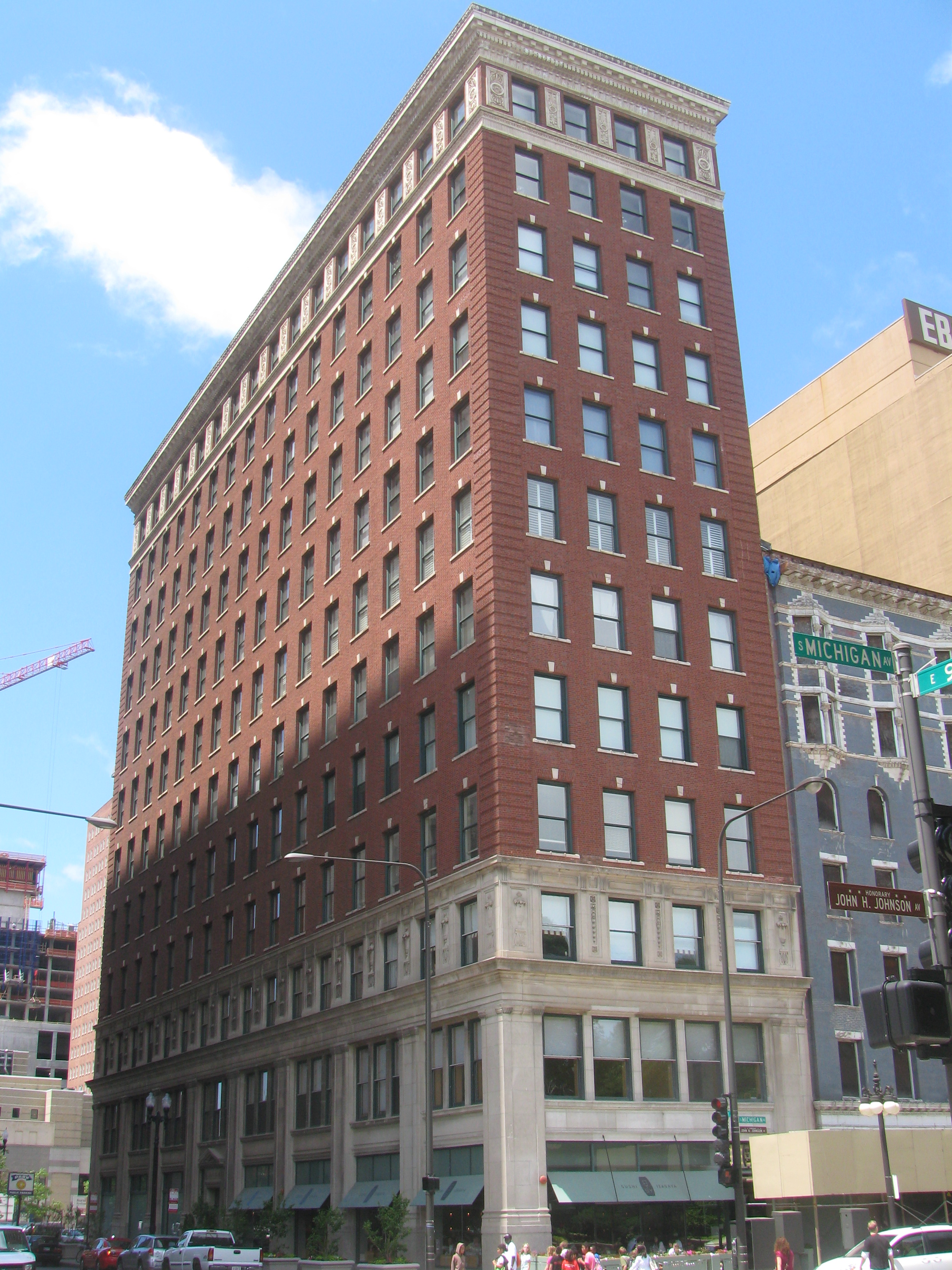

- Location within Chicago metropolitan area Location within Illinois Location within the United States
- Location: 836 S Michigan Ave., Chicago, Illinois
- Coordinates: 41°52′14″N 87°37′28″W
- Area: less than one acre
- Architect: Holabird and Roche
- Architectural style: Classical Revival
- NRHP reference No.: 01001538
- Added to NRHP: January 28, 2002

The Crane Company Building is an early skyscraper located at 836 S. Michigan Ave. in the Loop community area of Chicago, Illinois. The twelve-story building was designed by Holabird & Roche and built in 1912. The steel frame skyscraper was designed in the Classical Revival style, and its exterior design is split into three sections. The first and second floors are faced in limestone and feature piers supporting a cornice; the third floor is also covered in limestone. The fourth through eleventh floors are constructed in red brick; windows on these floors feature terra cotta keystones and sills, and the eleventh floor is capped by a terra cotta cornice. The twelfth floor is decorated in terra cotta panels which incorporate Crane Company valves in their design; this floor is also topped by a cornice.

The building originally housed offices for the Crane Company, which manufactured plumbing and heating equipment. The Crane Company played a significant role in both the Chicago economy, where it was a major employer of industrial workers, and the national manufacturing landscape, where it was considered "the United States' leading manufacturer" of iron and brass plumbing and heating fixtures. Due to the demolition of the Crane Company's factories and its early leaders' homes, the Crane Company Building is now the most significant landmark in Chicago associated with the company. After the Crane Company left the building in 1960, it was converted to a residential property.

The Crane Company Building was added to the National Register of Historic Places on January 28, 2002.
