= Westerly Memorial and Public Library =

Historic library in Rhode Island, US

- Westerly Library
- U.S. Historic district – Contributing property
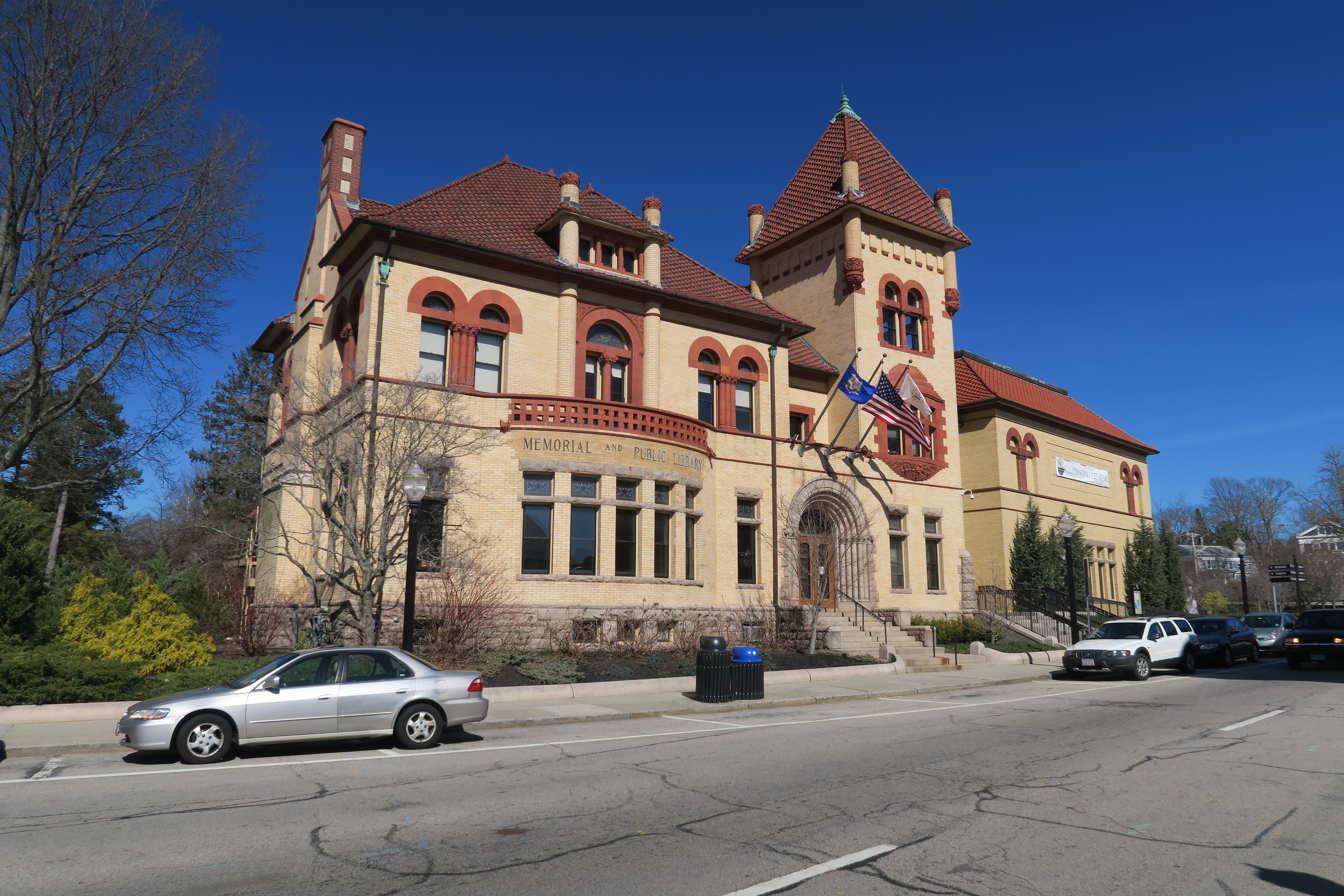
- Westerly Public Library seen from Broad St

- Location within Rhode Island Location within the United States
- Location: Westerly, Rhode Island
- Coordinates: 41.3773051°N 71.8297135°W
- Built: 1894
- Architect: Longstaff and Hurd
- Architectural style: Richardson Romanesque, Greek Revival, Late Victorian
- Website: www.westerlylibrary.org
- Part of: Wilcox Park Historic District (ID73000011); Westerly Downtown Historic District (ID84002055)
- Designated CP: May 7, 1973 (Wilcox Park), July 19, 1984 (Westerly Downtown)

The Westerly Memorial and Public Library is a non-profit public library located at 44 Broad Street in Westerly, Rhode Island, US. It is part of the Westerly Downtown Historic District and the Wilcox Park Historic District.

== History ==
The Westerly Memorial and Public Library was built in 1894 and was designed by Longstaff and Hurd in the Richardson Romanesque Revival style. It was built with funds from Stephen Wilcox in 1892. Originally the building also housed a bowling alley, gymnasium, art gallery, museum and a meeting space for the members of the Grand Army of the Republic. An eastern addition was built in 1928. Additions were also built in 1902, 1992 and a final addition was built in 1994, which increased the size of the building by nearly double.

Opened on August 15, 1894, it is maintained by the Memorial and Library Association of Westerly.

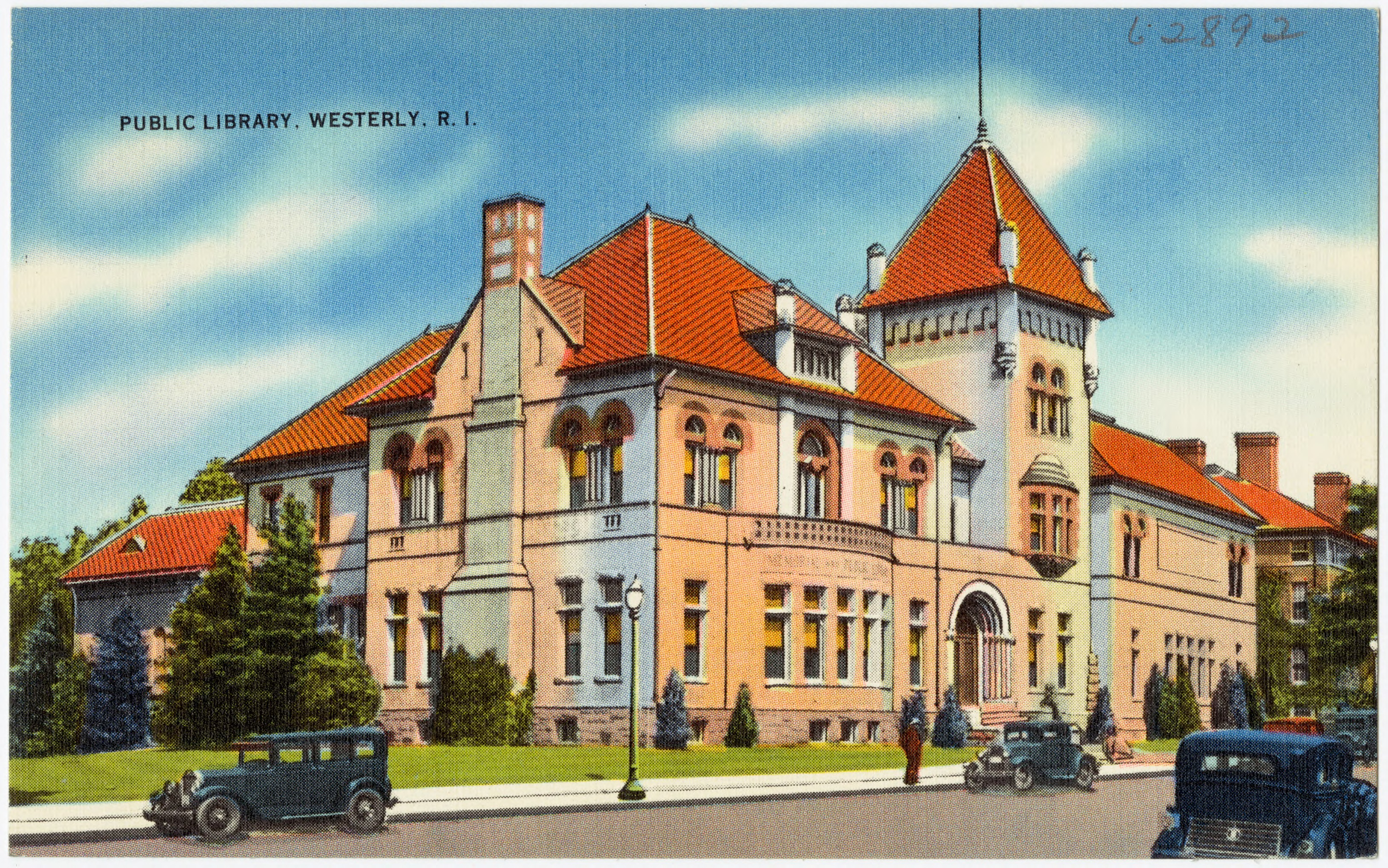
Westerly Memorial and Public Library, 1894.

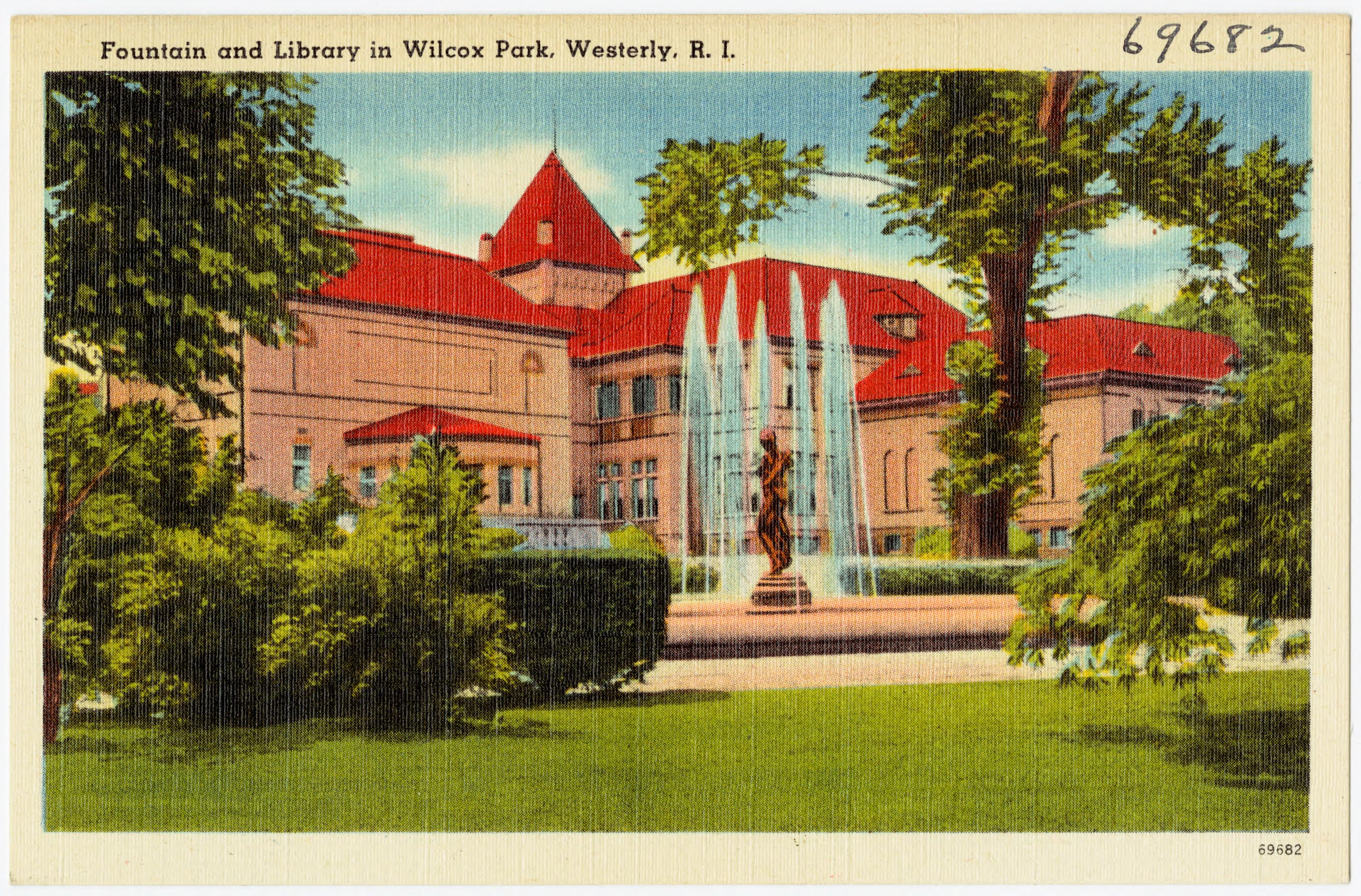
Westerly Memorial and Public Library Fountain

== See also ==
- Wilcox Park
- National Register of Historic Places listings in Washington County, Rhode Island
- Westerly Downtown Historic District
