= George Longstaff =

George Longstaff may refer to:

- George W. Longstaff (1850–1901), American architect
- George Blundell Longstaff (1849–1921), British civil activist
