= Westerly Downtown Historic District =

Historic district in Rhode Island, United States

- U.S. National Register of Historic Places
- U.S. Historic district
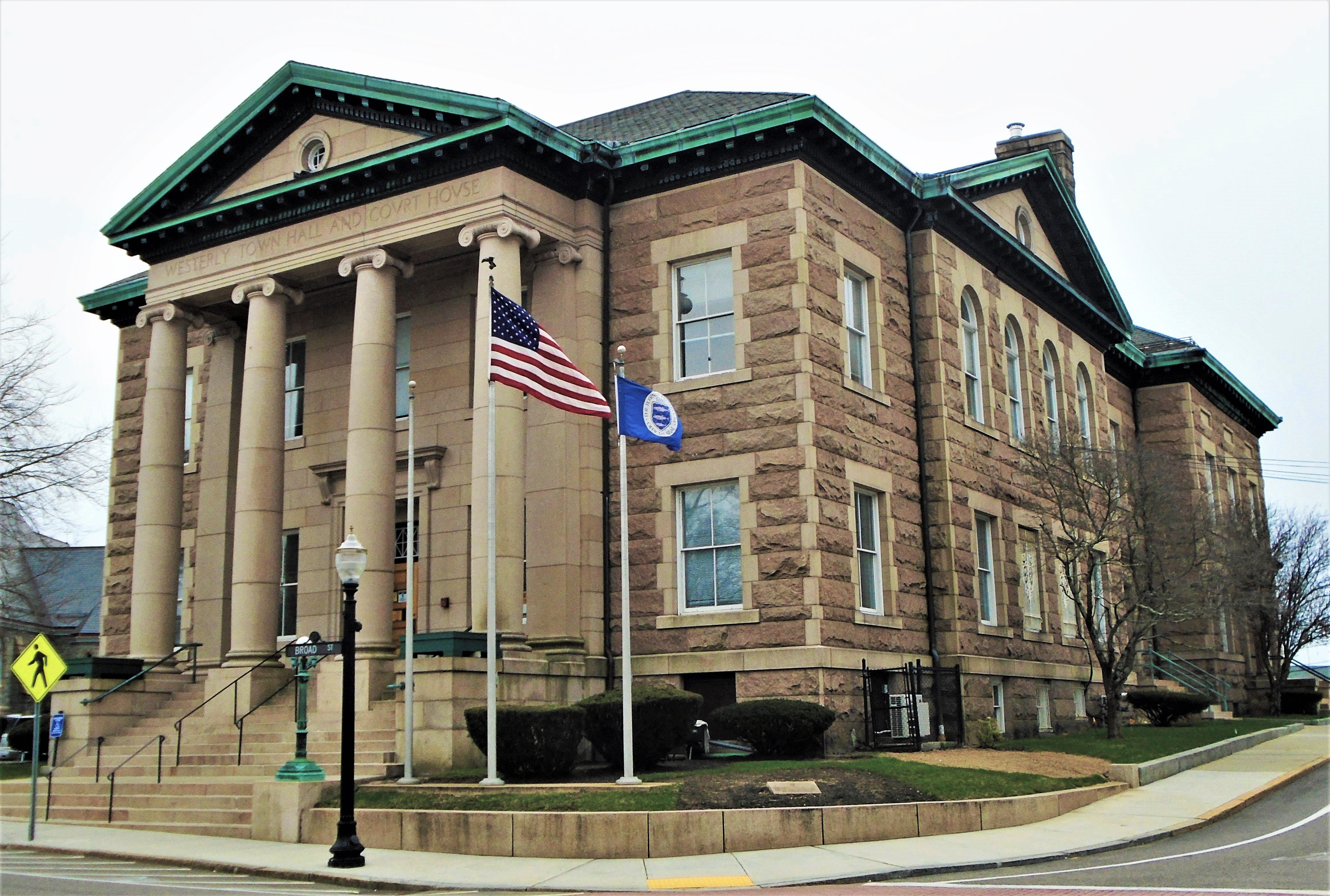
- Town Hall and Court House (1912) in 2021

- Location within Rhode Island Location within the United States
- Location: Westerly, Rhode Island
- Area: 24.7 acres (10.0 ha)
- Built: 1840
- Architect: Multiple
- Architectural style: Late 19th and 20th Century Revivals, Late Victorian, Art Deco
- NRHP reference No.: 84002055 (original); 95001288 (increase 1); 07001297 (increase 2)

Significant dates
- Added to NRHP: July 19, 1984
- Boundary increases: November 7, 1995; December 19, 2007

The Westerly Downtown Historic District, commonly called Downtown Westerly, is a historic district encompassing most of the commercial and civic district of Westerly, Rhode Island, United States. It extends from Broad and Union Streets eastward along High Street, and north along Canal Street to Railroad Avenue, where it extends to include the historic railroad station. The district contains a compact and cohesive collection of commercial and civic buildings built primarily during the last three decades of the 19th century and the first three decades of the 20th century, including the Old Town Hall (1872–74), the current Town Hall (1912), the Spanish Colonial railroad station (1912), and the Classical Revival post office (1914).

The district was listed on the National Register of Historic Places in 1984, with expansions in 1995 and 2007.

== Representative contributing buildings ==
Among the contributing buildings of the Westerly Downtown Historic District are the following:

- Brown Building (completed 1896)
- Old Town Hall, designed by builder Charles Maxson and architect Alfred Stone (completed 1874)
- Westerly Memorial and Public Library, architect Longstaff & Hurd (completed 1894; addition 1924)
- Town Hall and Courthouse, architect William R. Walker & Son (completed 1912)
- Westerly Railroad Station (completed in 1912)
- Post Office, architect James Knox Taylor (completed 1914)
- Industrial Trust Co. Building (completed 1916)
- Washington Trust Co. Building, architect York and Sawyer (completed 1925)

== Gallery ==
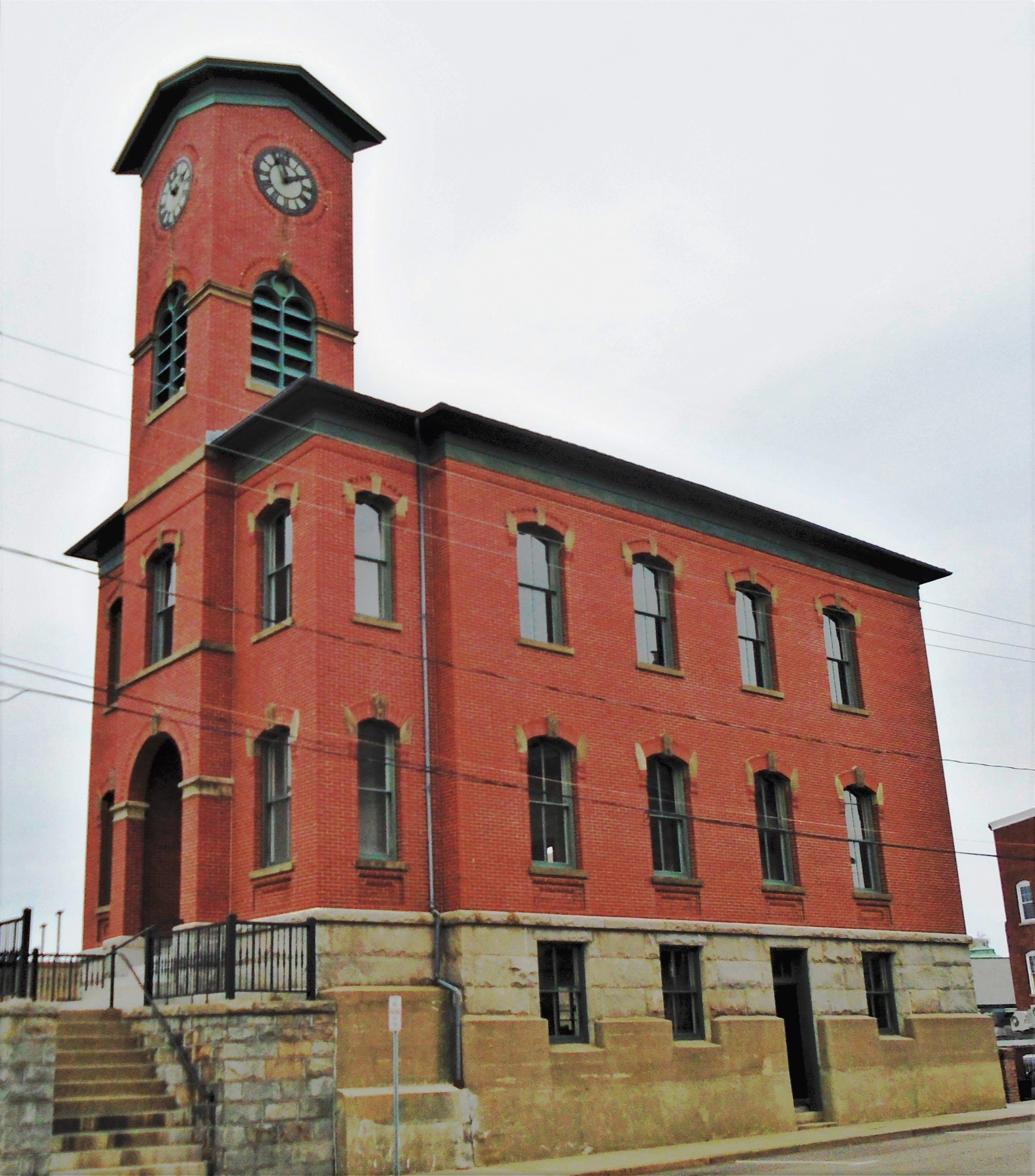
Old Town Hall (1874)

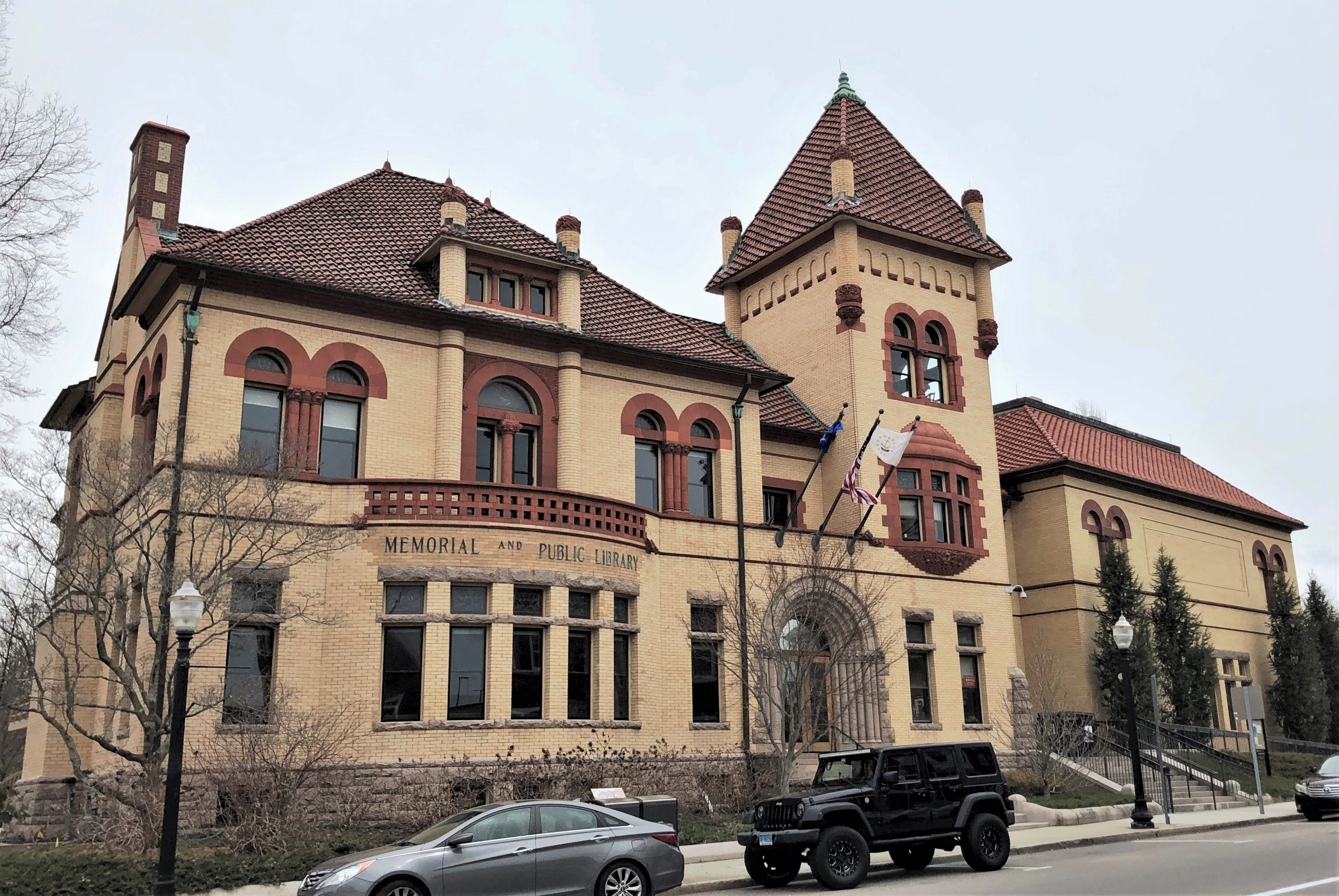
Westerly Memorial and Public Library (1894; addition 1924)

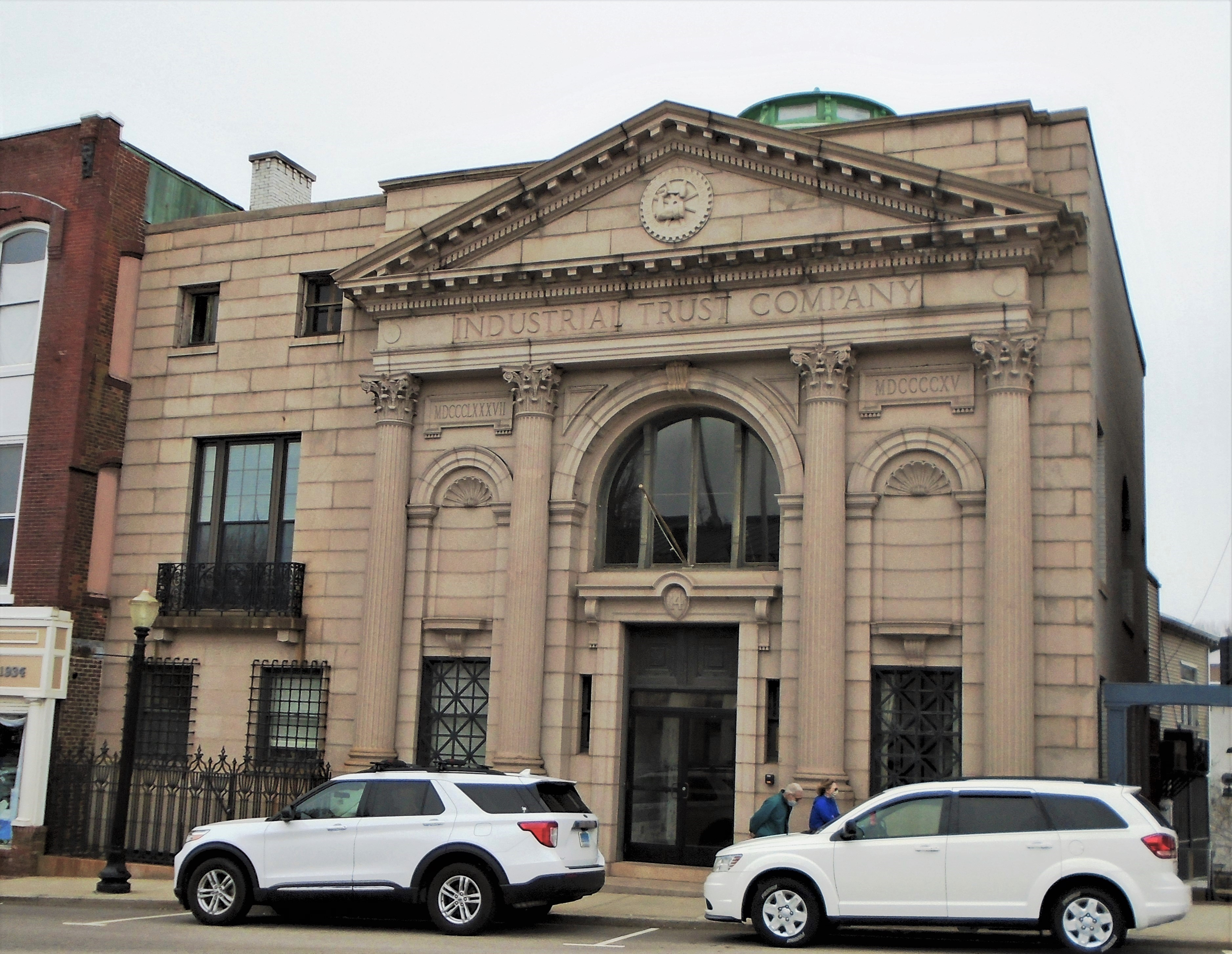
Industrial Trust Company (1916)

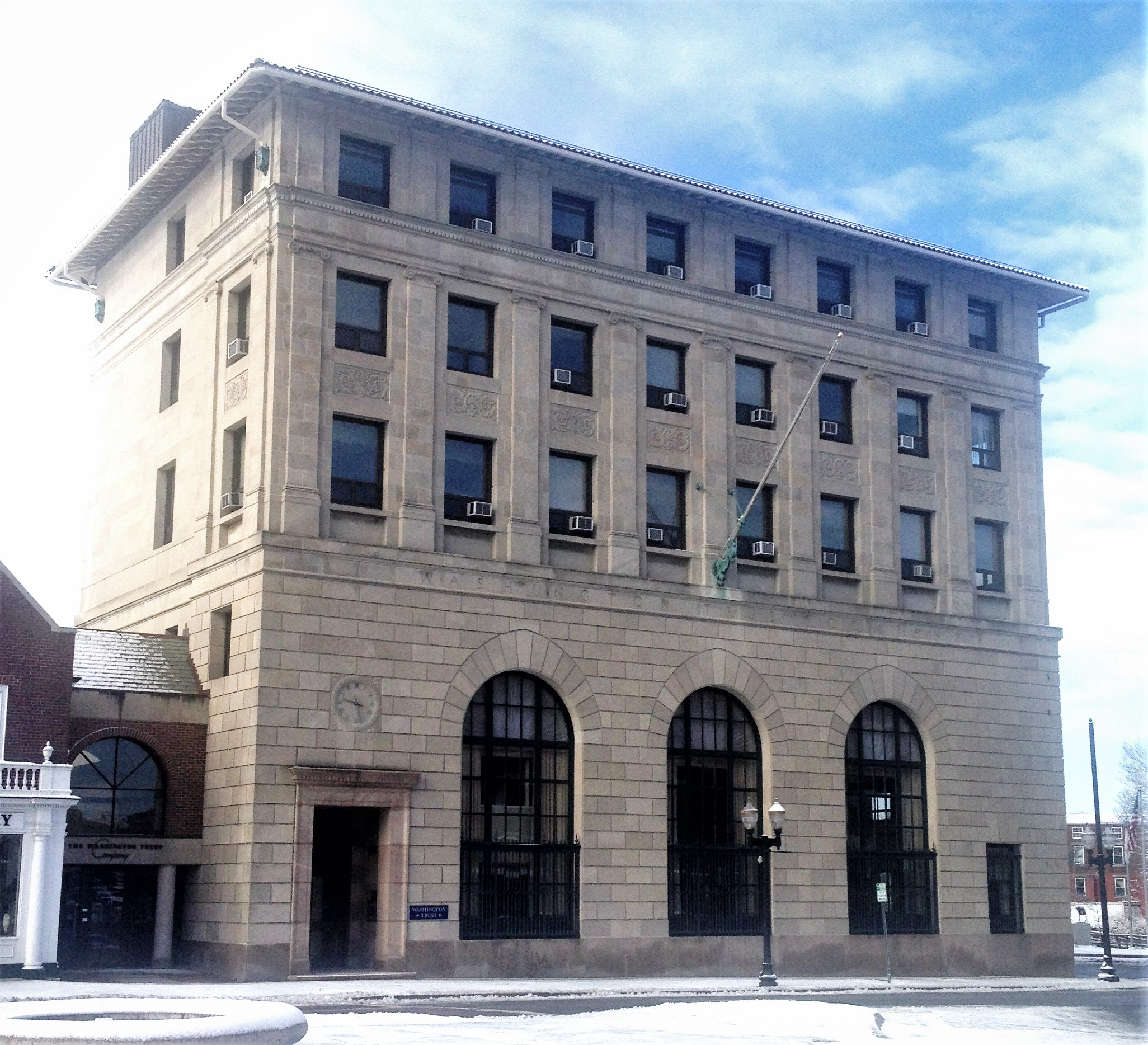
Washington Trust Co. Building (1925)
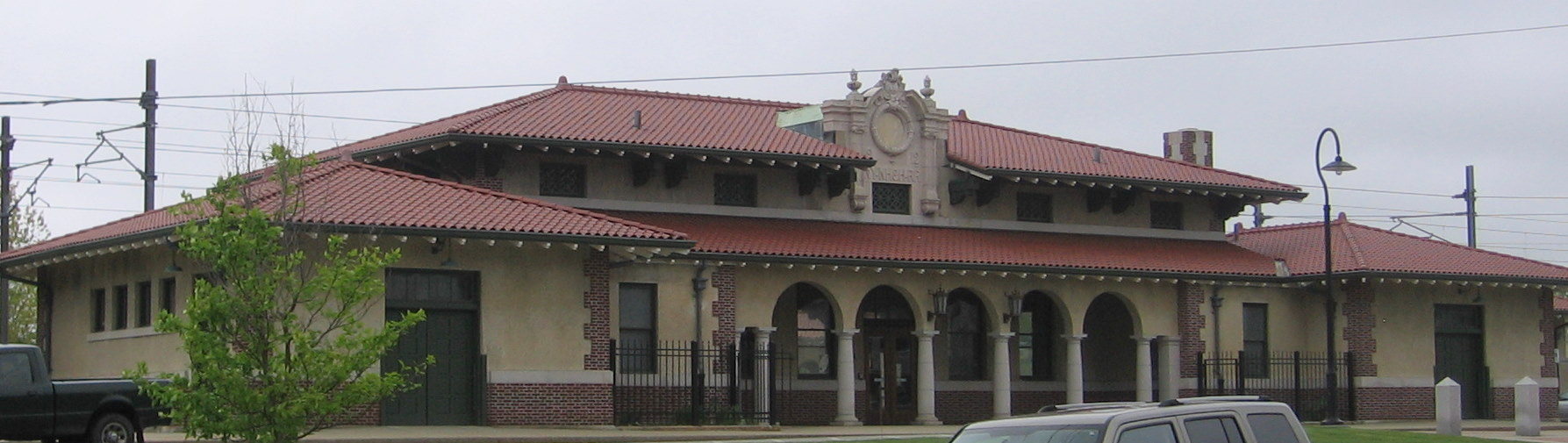
Westerly Railroad Station (1912)

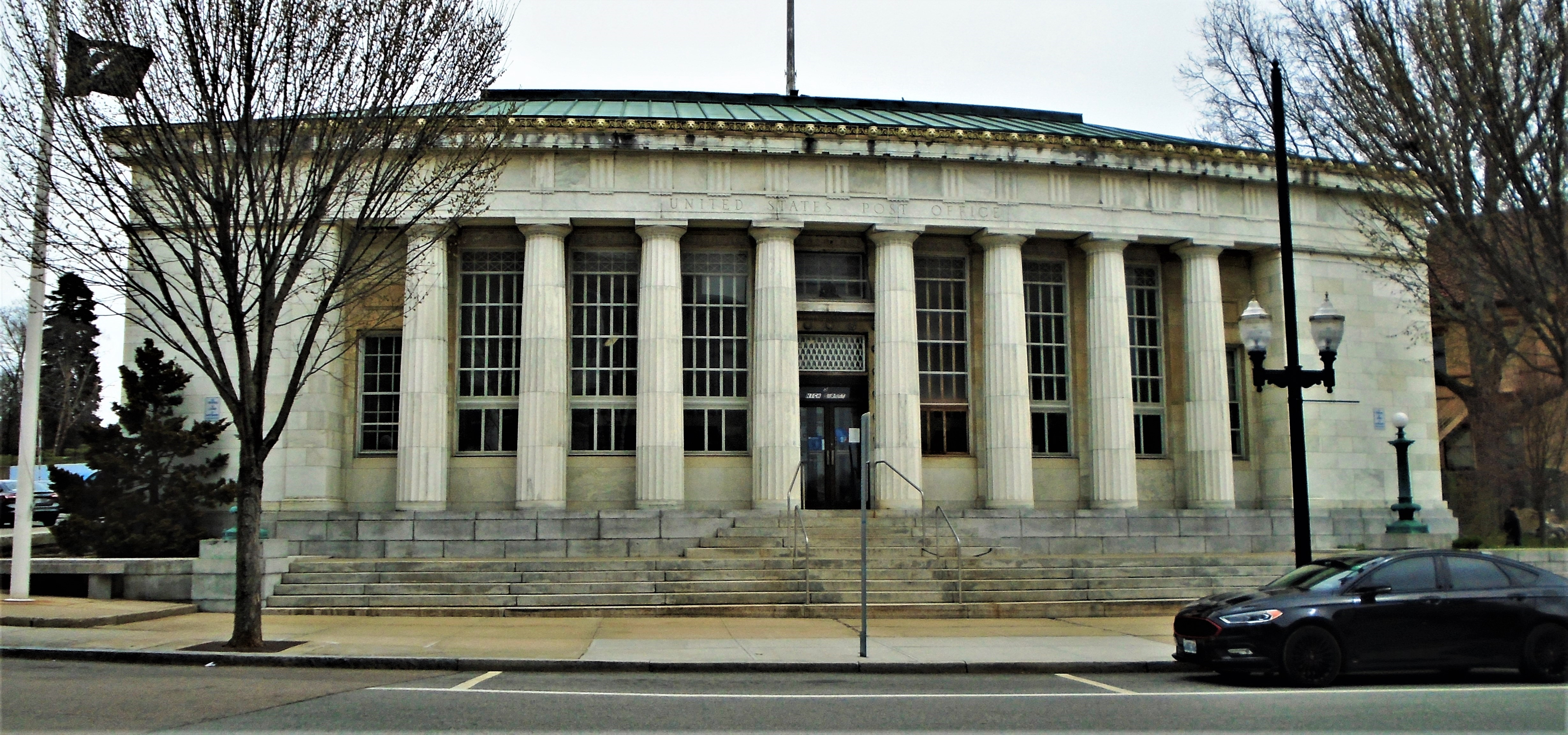
Westerly Post Office (1914)

== See also ==
- Wilcox Park Historic District, which partially overlaps this district
- North End Historic District (Westerly, Rhode Island)
- National Register of Historic Places listings in Washington County, Rhode Island
