= Maplewood School =

- U.S. National Register of Historic Places
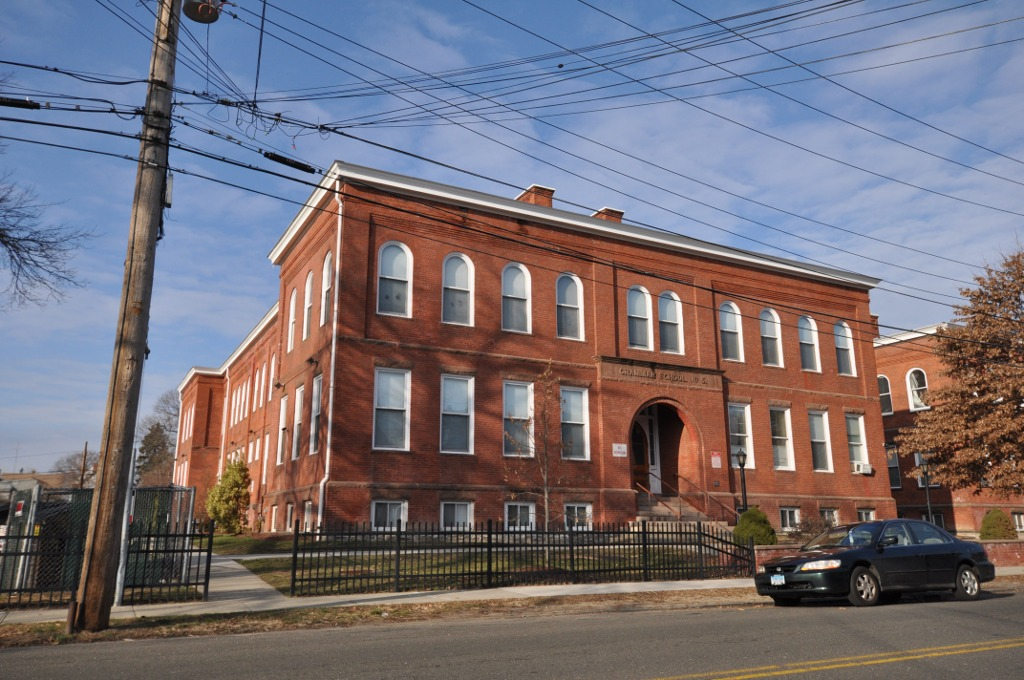

- Location within Connecticut Location within the United States
- Location: 434 Maplewood Avenue, Bridgeport, Connecticut
- Coordinates: 41°10′43″N 73°12′34″W
- Area: 1.2 acres (0.49 ha)
- Built: 1893
- Architect: Longstaff & Hurd; Henry A. Howe, Jr.; Joseph W. Northrop
- Architectural style: Renaissance
- NRHP reference No.: 90000153
- Added to NRHP: February 21, 1990

The Maplewood School, also known as Grammar School No. 5, is a historic school building at 434 Maplewood Avenue in Bridgeport, Connecticut. It was built in 1893, and was designed by Longstaff & Hurd. It was built as part of a major program to improve the city's schools and provide for a rapidly growing population. It was listed on the National Register of Historic Places in 1990.

== Description and history ==
The former Maplewood School building is located in a residential area on Bridgeport's West Side, occupying part of a block between Linwood and Maplewood Avenues. It is a large two-story brick building, with a flat roof and modest Renaissance Revival styling. Second-story windows on its oldest portion have rounded tops, and the main entrance is set recessed within a rounded-arch opening. The original building had eight classrooms around a central hall, which was doubled with the first addition and doubled again with construction of the annex.

The city of Bridgeport grew rapidly between 1880 and 1920, and undertook a massive building program to replace its aging one and two-room schoolhouses with modern schools. Built in 1892, Maplewood School replaced a one-room schoolhouse, and exemplifies thinking of the period for educational facilities, including graded classrooms, indoor plumbing, and heating. The building was designed by Longstaff & Hurd, a local architectural firm. As a result of overcrowding, in 1903 architect Henry A. Howe, Jr. designed additions, which were built onto both fronts of the school. In 1908, the school was once again enlarged with an annex designed by Joseph W. Northrop. The school was closed in 1980.

== See also ==
- History of Bridgeport, Connecticut
- National Register of Historic Places listings in Bridgeport, Connecticut
