= Wilcox Park =

- Wilcox Park Historic District
- U.S. National Register of Historic Places
- U.S. Historic district
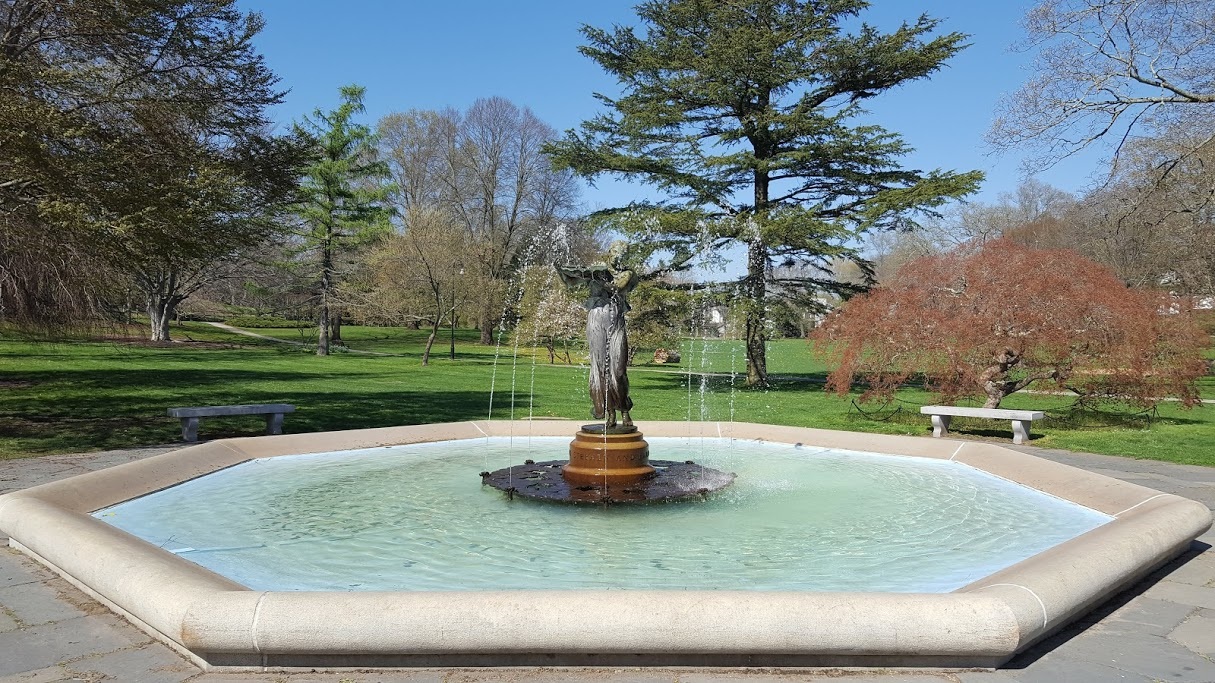
- Wilcox Memorial Fountain

- Location within Rhode Island Location within the United States
- Location: Westerly, Rhode Island
- Architect: Warren H. Manning
- Architectural style: Late 19th And 20th Century Revivals, Greek Revival, Late Victorian
- NRHP reference No.: 73000011
- Added to NRHP: May 7, 1973

Wilcox Park (14 acres (5.7 ha)) is a park and arboretum located at 44 High Street, Westerly, Rhode Island. It is open to the public from dawn to 9 pm, without fee, and has been on the National Register of Historic Places since 1973 as Wilcox Park Historic District. The historic district includes 84 houses/buildings of the neighborhood surrounding the park covering a 50-acre (20 ha) area, including the main post office and library within the town of Westerly.

== History ==
Wilcox Park was the 1898 bequest of Harriet Wilcox, widow of Stephen Wilcox. The latter invented the non-explosive boiler and founded, along with fellow West'lyan Herman Babcock, the giant engineering firm of Babcock & Wilcox, and was a major funder of the Romanesque Westerly Library, which faces the park and was built in 1892.

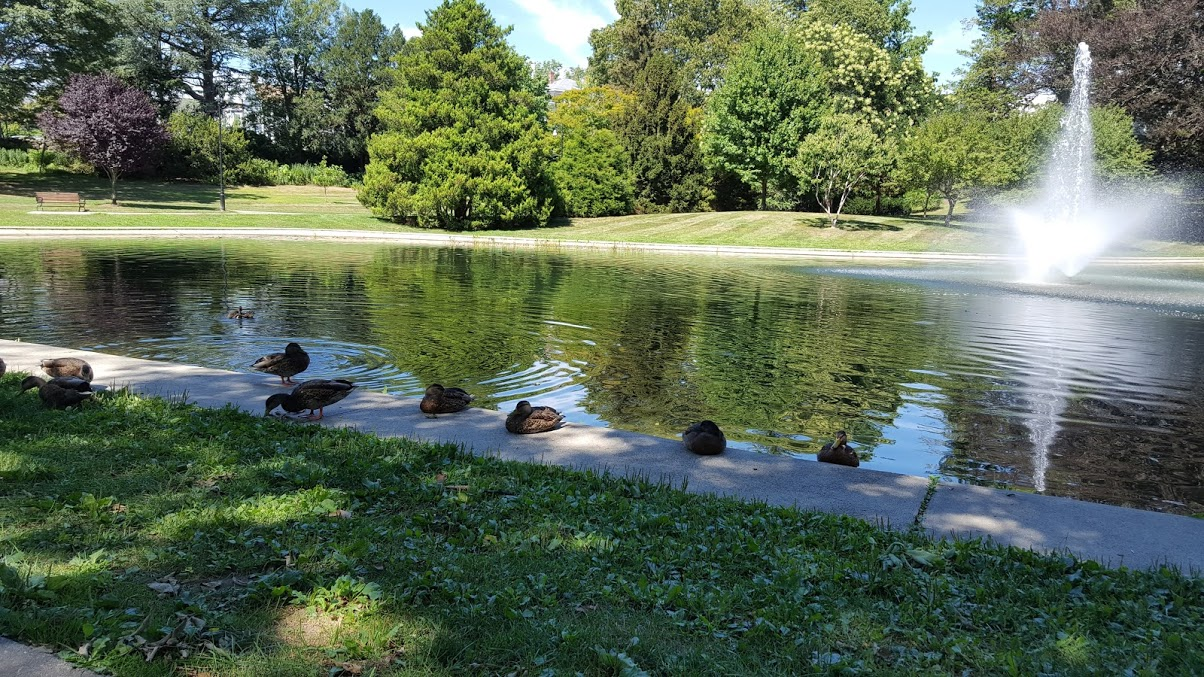
Fish Pond in Wilcox Park.

Wilcox Park was designed in 1898 by Warren H. Manning, who had been until 1896 an associate of Frederick Law Olmsted, and originally dominated by plants native to the region. However, in the 1960s efforts began to develop the park as an arboretum. Current specialties include a dwarf conifer garden, herb garden, garden of the senses, and perennial garden, set off by fine Westerly granite masonry designed by landscape architect Arthur Shurcliff in 1929–1930.

The park contains a number of monuments and memorials including the Wilcox Memorial Fountain (1930), designed by John Francis Paramino and given in honor of Harriet and Stephen Wilcox. One tree was planted in memory of boxing champion Rocky Marciano.

Today, Wilcox Park is privately operated by the Westerly Library and Wilcox Park's board of trustees. Both paid staff and volunteers are responsible for the upkeep of the grounds. In 2006 the board announced a plan to restore the park's original character by replacing the many walkways and the aging path lights.

The park is the location of the Summer Pops by the Chorus of Westerly (since 1980) and the Shakespeare in the Park productions by the Colonial Theatre.

== Gallery ==
Buildings in the Wilcox Park Historic District

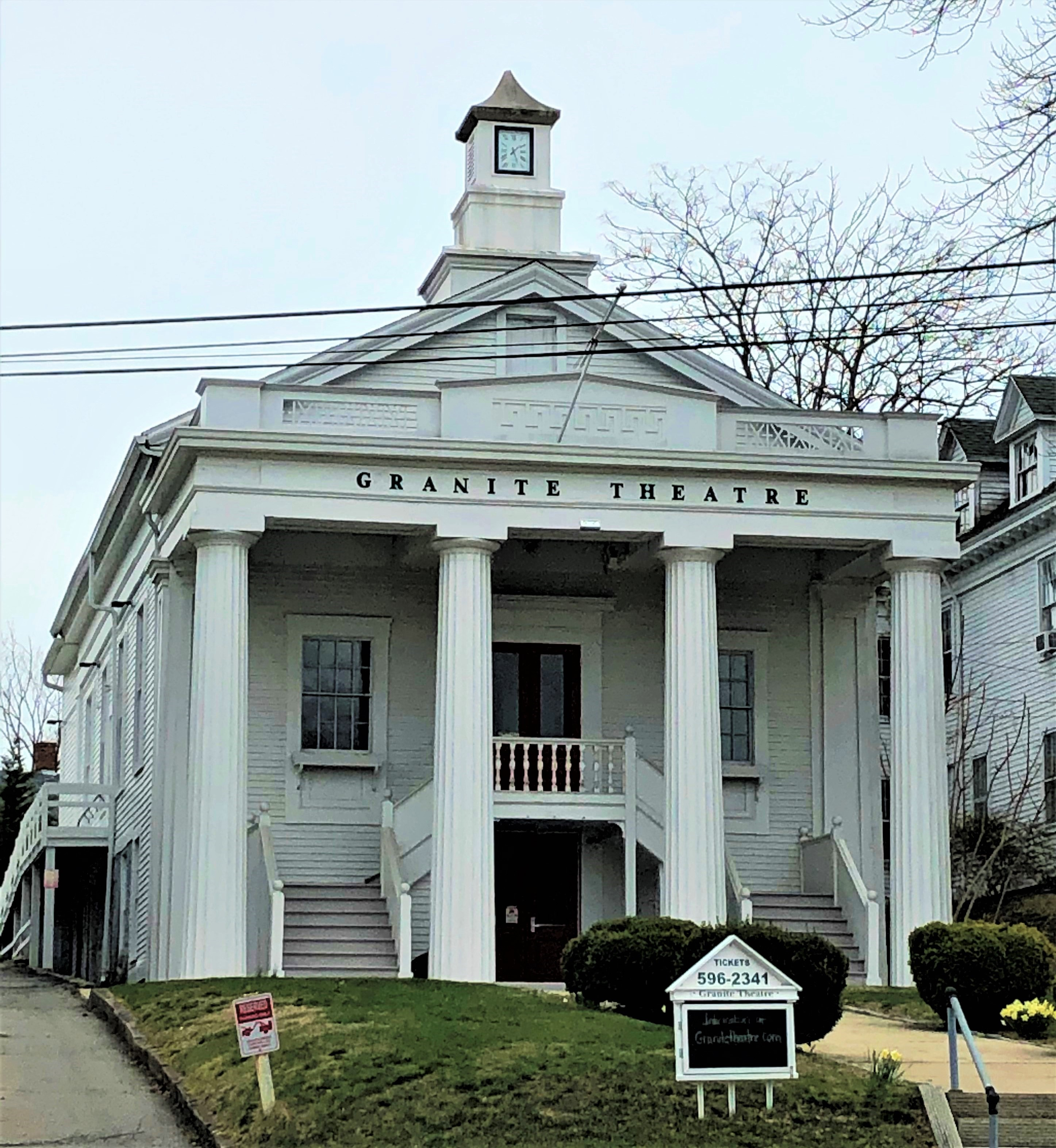
The Granite Theater, formerly the Broad Street Christian Church (1849)

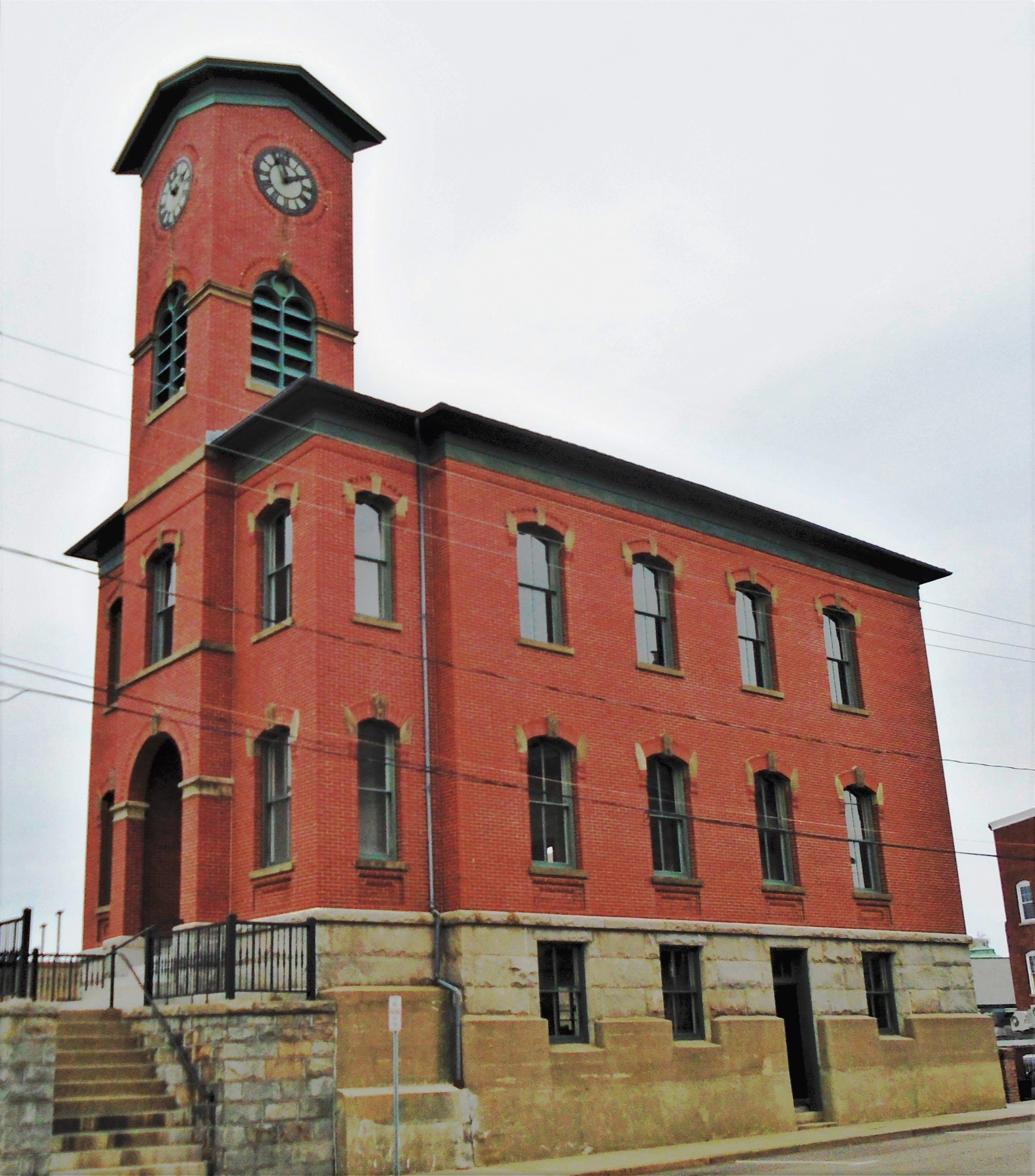
Old Town Hall (1874)

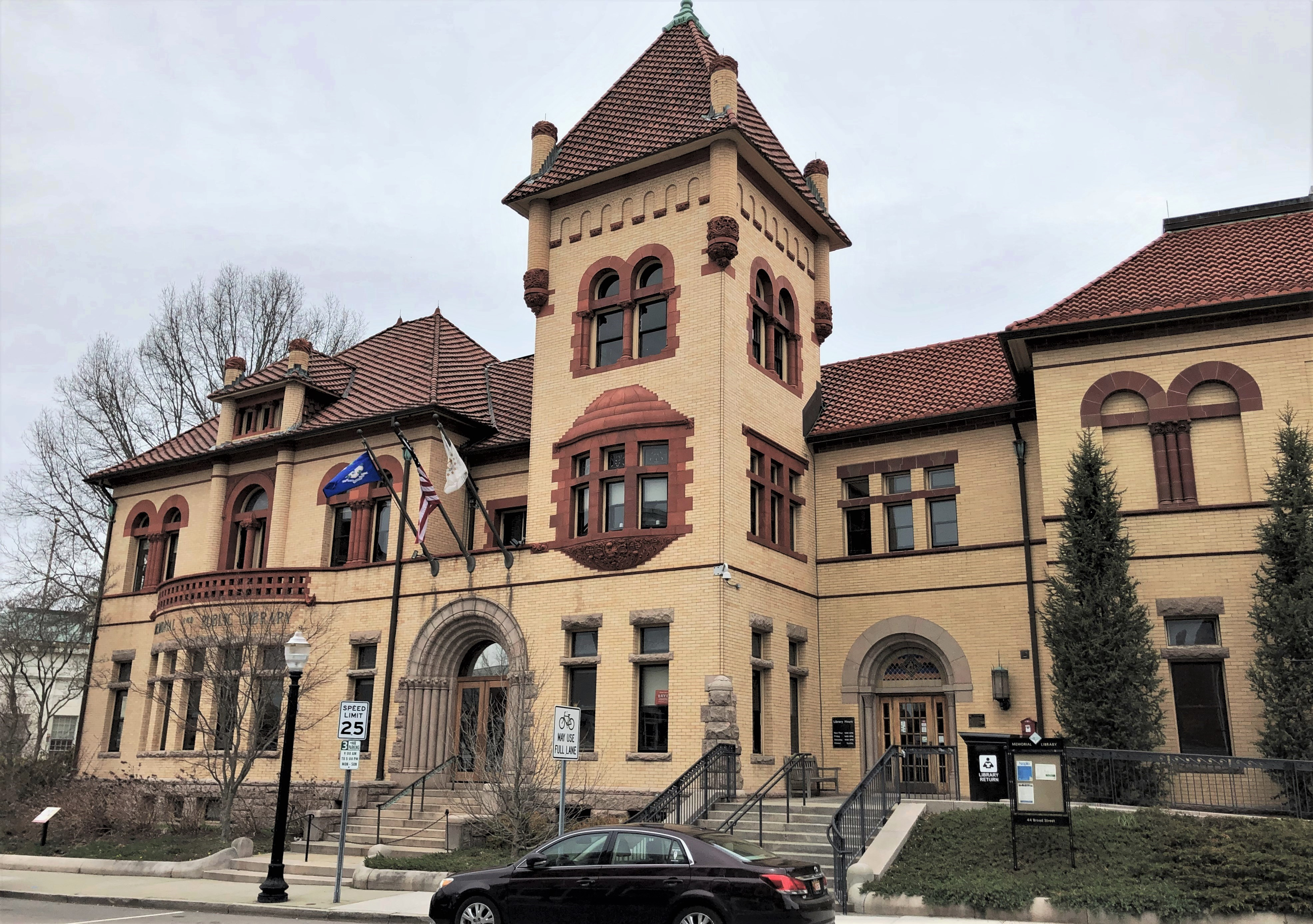
The Westerly memorial and Public Library (1894, 1924)

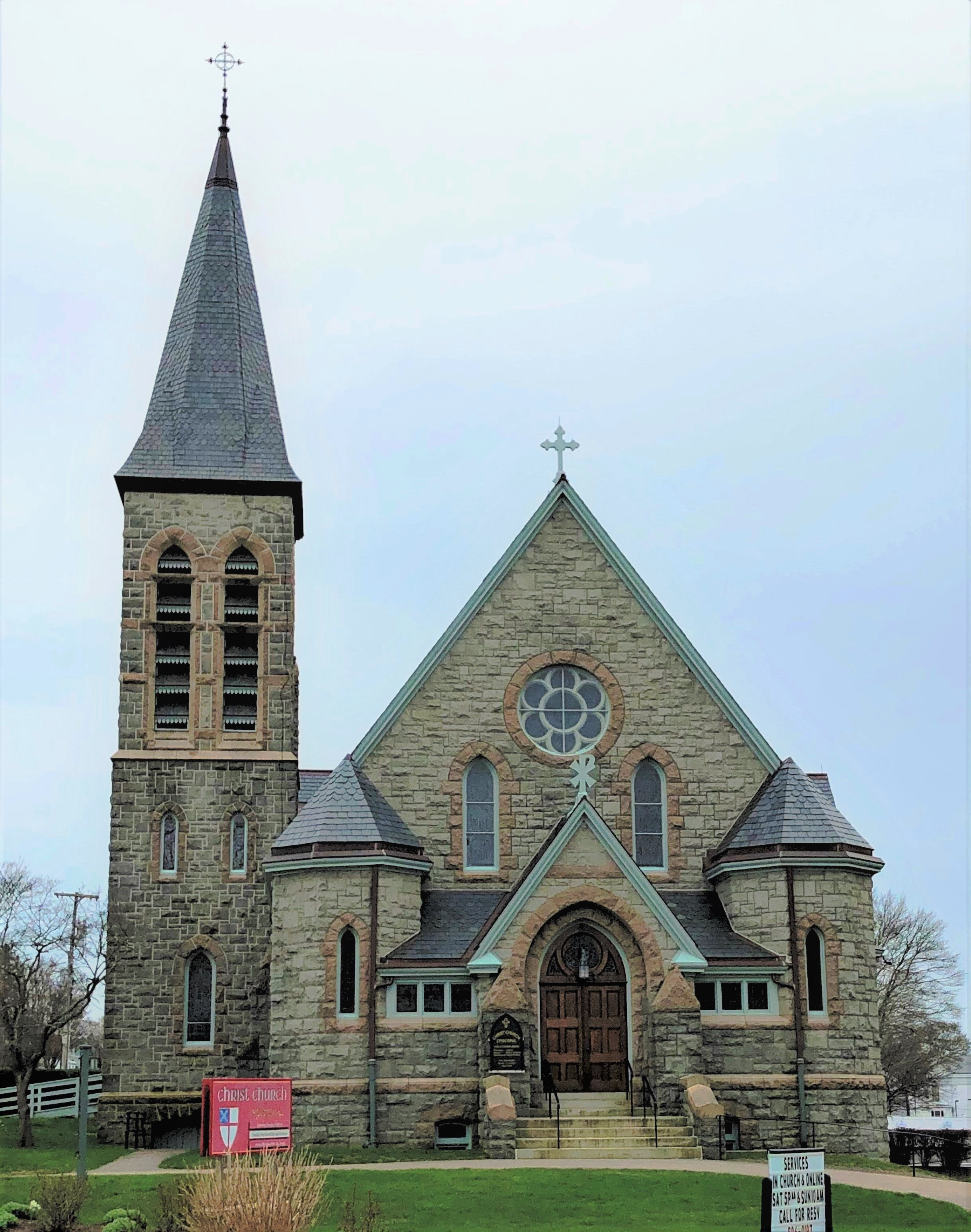
Christ Church (1905)

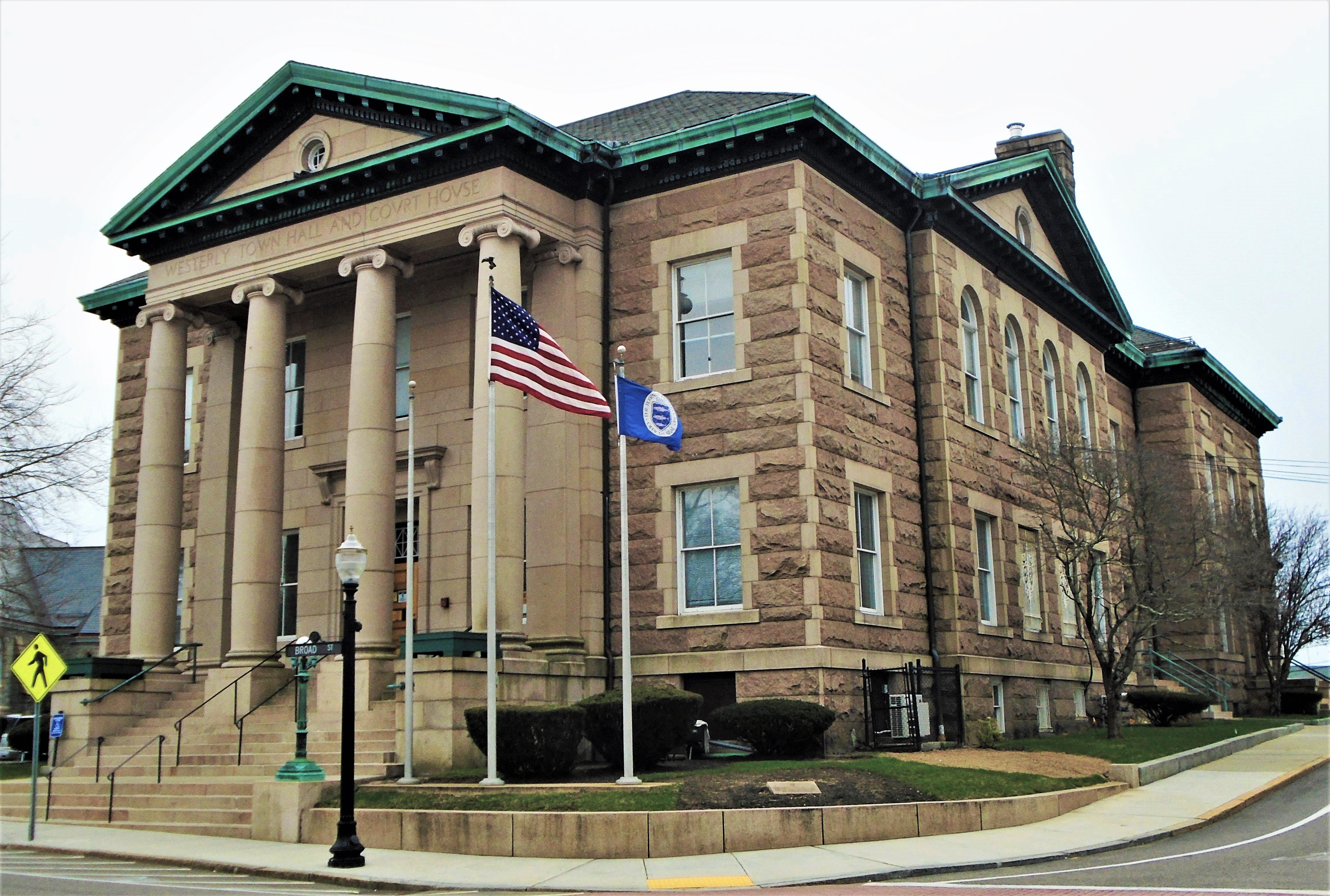
The Town Hall and Court House (1912)

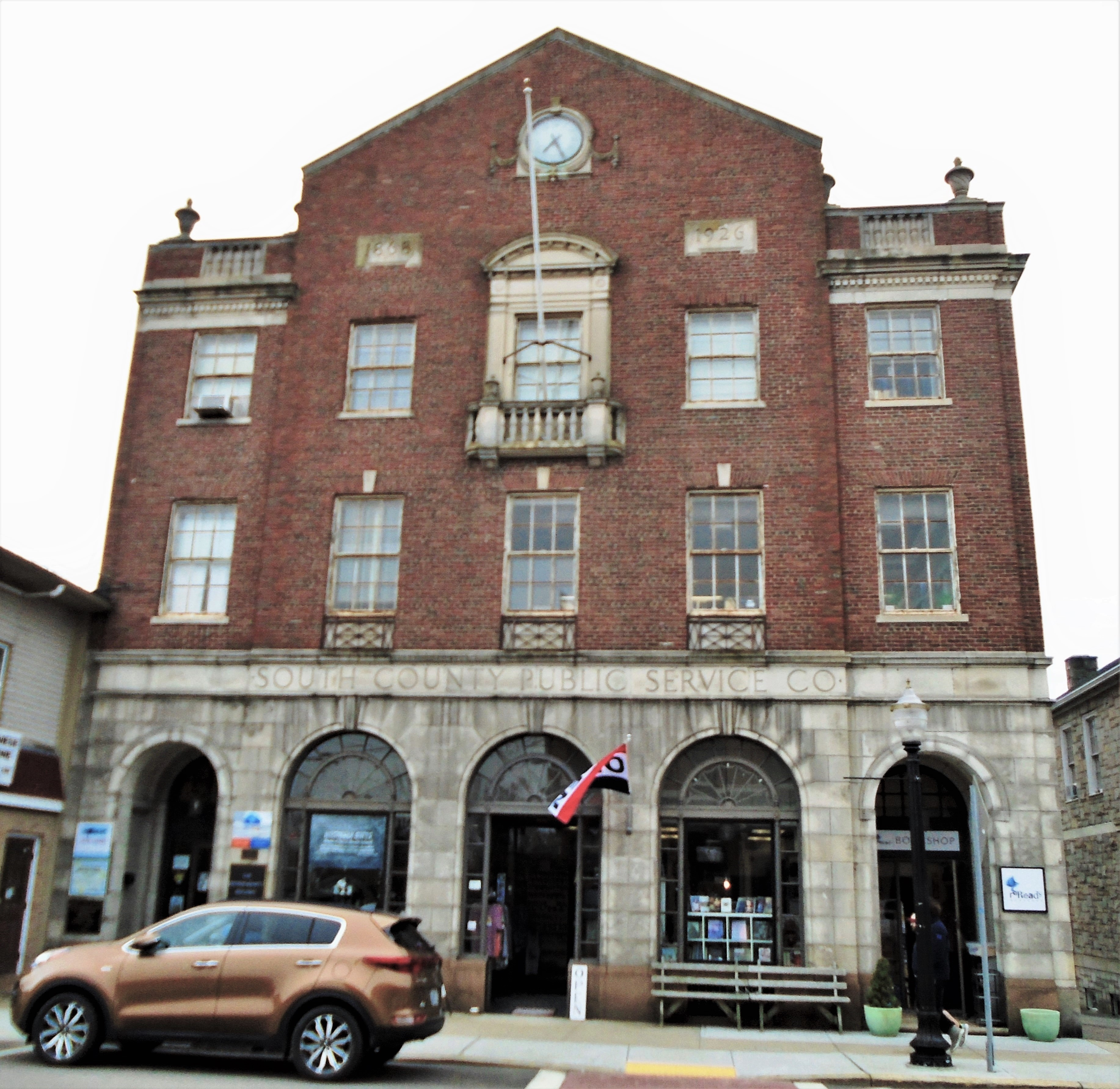
The South County Public Service Building (c.1920s)

== See also ==
- List of botanical gardens and arboretums in Rhode Island
- National Register of Historic Places listings in Washington County, Rhode Island
- Westerly Downtown Historic District
