= United States Post Office (Westerly, Rhode Island) =

- U.S. Post Office
- U.S. National Register of Historic Places
- U.S. Historic district – Contributing property
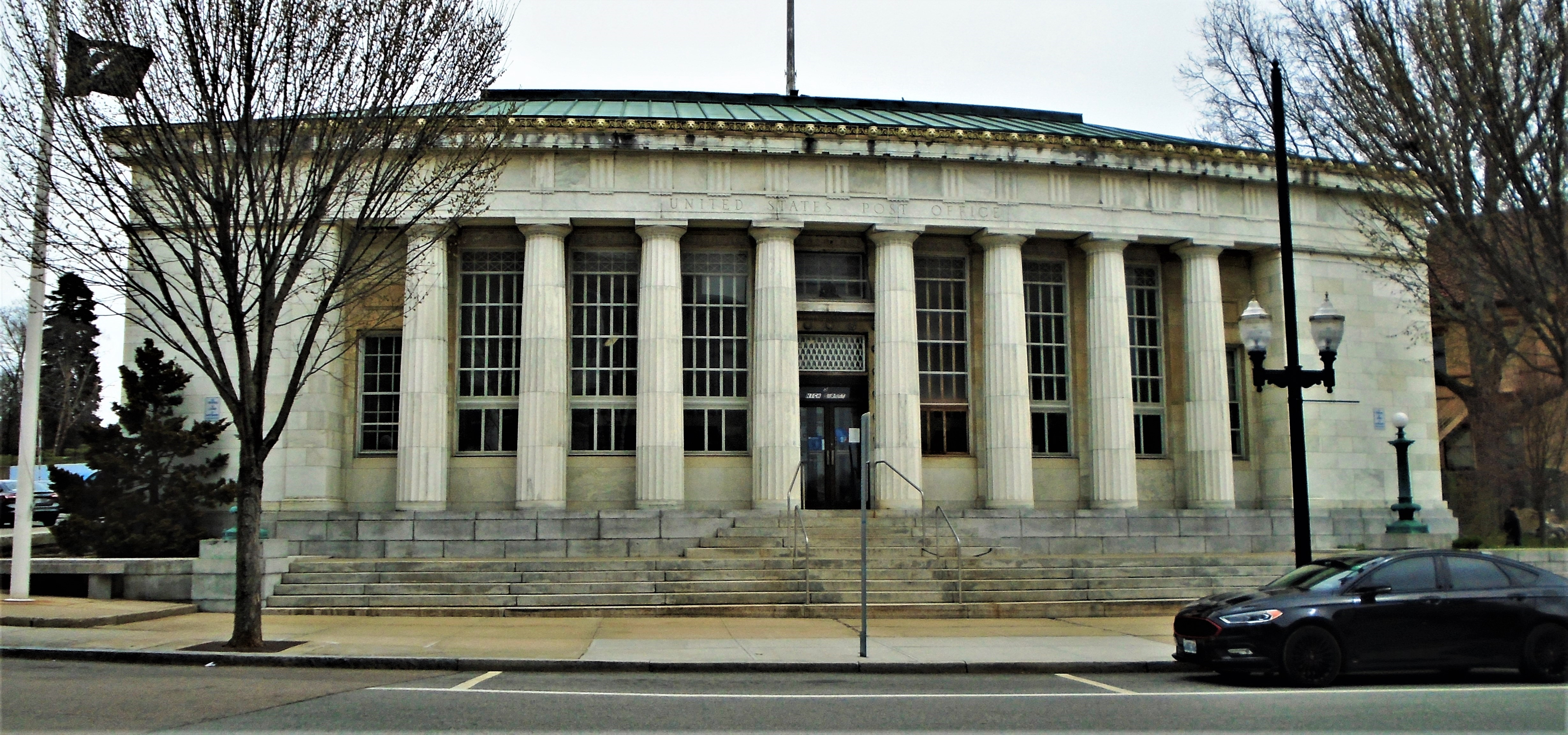
- (2021)

- Location within Rhode Island Location within the United States
- Location: 5 High Street, Westerly, Rhode Island
- Coordinates: 41.3778°N 71.8302°W
- Built: 1914
- Architect: James Knox Taylor
- Architectural style: Classical Revival
- Part of: Wilcox Park Historic District; Westerly Downtown Historic District; (ID84002055)
- NRHP reference No.: 71000004

Significant dates
- Added to NRHP: August 12, 1971
- Designated CP: July 19, 1984

High Street Station, formerly the main Westerly Post Office, is a historic United States post office at the intersection of Broad and High Streets in Westerly, Washington County, Rhode Island.

== Description ==
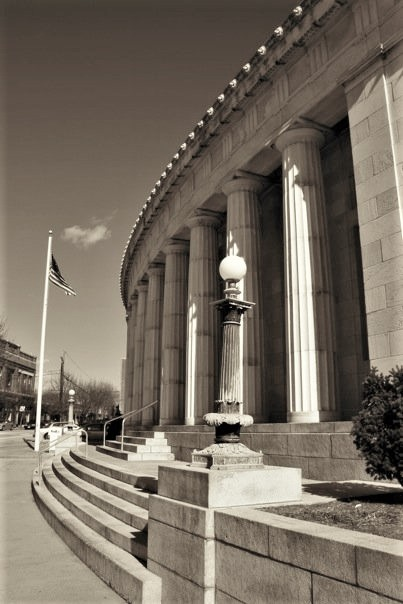
The facade of the building follows the curve of the street

The post office building was designed in the Classical Revival style by architect James Knox Taylor and was built from 1913 to 1914. The single-story building features a broad curving facade with eight fluted Doric columns of Vermont marble, flanked by wide piers. The interior lobby space retains many original features, including terrazzo and marble flooring, and a coffered ceiling with decorative molding.

The building was added to the National Register of Historic Places as U.S. Post Office in 1971.

The building "demonstrates the height of grand government-sponsored design" and "is often considered the finest post office in the state."

== See also ==
- National Register of Historic Places listings in Washington County, Rhode Island
- List of United States post offices
