= Brown Building (Westerly) =

- U.S. Historic district – Contributing property
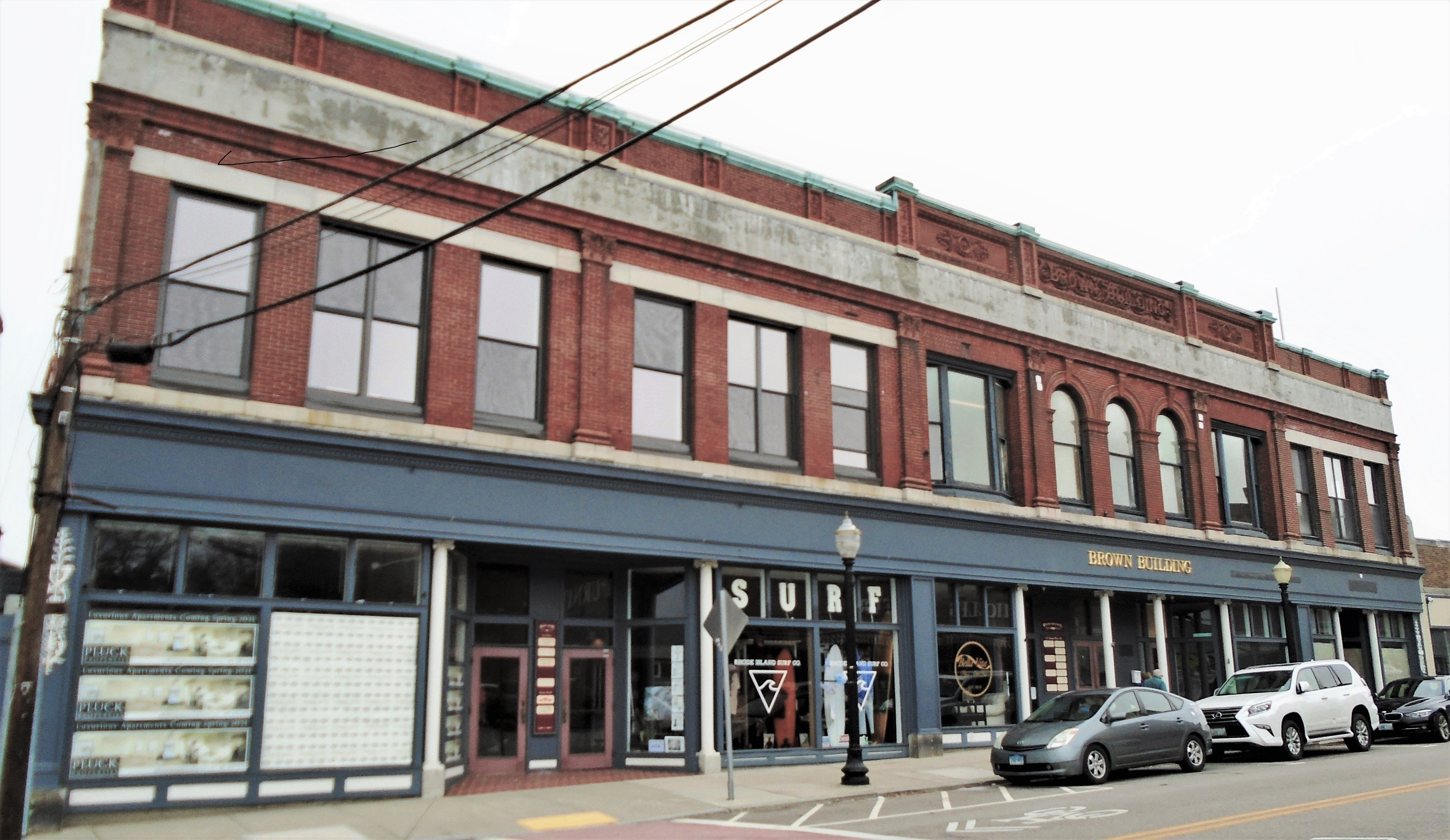
- The Brown Building in 2021
- Location: Westerly, Rhode Island
- Coordinates: 41°22′41.71″N 71°49′49.29″W
- Built: 1896
- Architect: Randolf, Bently, and Company
- Architectural style: Romanesque
- Part of: Westerly Downtown Historic District (ID84002055)
- Designated CP: July 19, 1984

The Brown Building at 16-26 High Street in Westerly, Rhode Island was built in 1896 in the late Victorian style, and rebuilt in 1903 after a fire. It is one of the best-preserved parts of the Westerly Downtown Historic District.

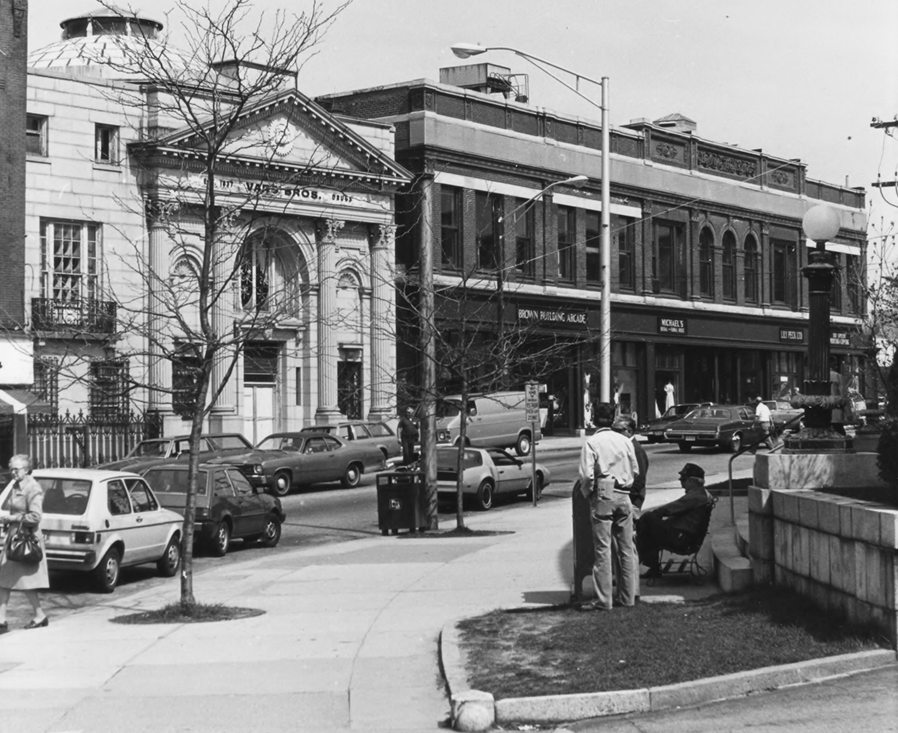
View of west side of High Street showing the Brown Building (1984).
