= George Kent Performance Hall =

Historic church in Rhode Island, United States

- Former Immaculate Conception Church
- U.S. National Register of Historic Places
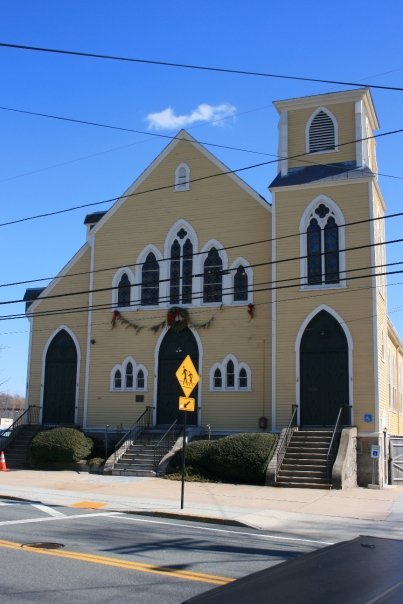
- George Kent Performance Hall, the former Immaculate Conception Church

- Location within Rhode Island Location within the United States
- Location: 119 High Street, Westerly, Rhode Island
- Coordinates: 41°22′55″N 71°49′32″W
- Built: 1886
- Architect: Patrick Holliday
- Architectural style: Gothic
- NRHP reference No.: 73000007
- Added to NRHP: April 24, 1973

The George Kent Performance Hall (known previously as the Immaculate Conception Church and the Westerly Center for the Arts) is a historic building in Westerly, Rhode Island.

== Description ==
The building, a rectangular Carpenter Gothic structure, was built as a church in 1886-89 by Patrick Holliday for Immaculate Conception Parish http://immcon.org/ . the first Roman Catholic parish in Westerly, founded in 1886. The parish is part of the Diocese of Providence and the church was in use by the parish until 1968, when services were moved to a new and larger structure located about 100 yards south of the old building. The structure was added to the National Register of Historic Places in 1973. The building served as the Westerly Center from the Arts from the early 1970s until 1991 when it was purchased by the Chorus of Westerly.

In 2005 the building was rededicated as the George Kent Performance Hall. Kent Hall is now owned and operated by the Chorus of Westerly and hosts their symphonic season and programs as well as a variety of other music and arts events. Some private and community activities also take place in the center.

== See also ==
- National Register of Historic Places listings in Washington County, Rhode Island
