= Chorus of Westerly =

Chorus based in Westerly, Rhode Island, US

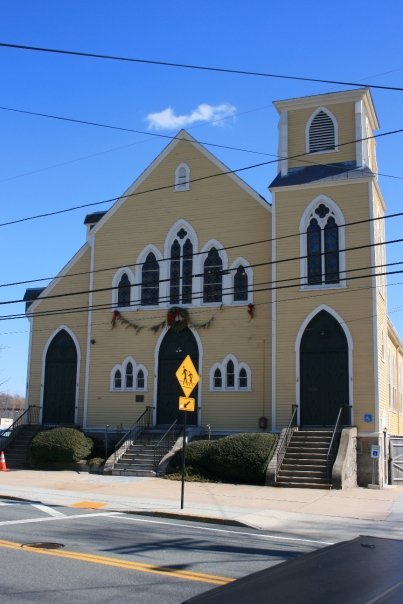
George Kent Performance Hall, the Former Immaculate Conception Church is listed on the National Register of Historic Places

The Chorus of Westerly is a 190-voice chorus based in Westerly, Rhode Island. It is one of the few choruses in the United States that has children singing alongside adults for every performance of its season (regardless of work or difficulty). Members of the chorus come from all over Rhode Island and southeastern Connecticut, with some members coming from as far as Bristol, Middlesex and Norfolk counties in Massachusetts. As part of its typical season, the chorus will present two "classical" concert series (one in November and one in May), a series of Christmas Pops concerts in December, seven performances of "A Celebration of Twelfth Night" in January (a musical and theatrical event based on an originally written stage play set in medieval times), a guest choral ensemble in February, an 'a cappella' concert series in March, and Summer Pops, a large outdoor performance held in Westerly's Wilcox Park for audiences of 25,000 each June. For its classical and pops events, the Chorus performs with professional orchestral musicians from the Boston Musicians Association and from across Rhode Island.

Over its fifty-seven seasons, the Chorus of Westerly has performed many of the most important choral works ever written, from J.S. Bach's Mass in B Minor to William Walton's Belshazzar's Feast. In recent seasons, the chorus has performed Duruflé's Requiem, Mozart's Mass in C Minor, Vaughan Williams' Hodie, and Honegger's King David. The chorus has also given the American premiere performance of several British choral works of the past century. This list includes "Songs of the Fleet" by Charles Villiers Stanford, "Lux Aeterna" by William Mathias, "Birthday Madrigals" by John Rutter, "Mass of the Sea" by Paul Patterson and several other works of George Dyson, Patrick Hadley and Gilbert Vinters.

In the summer months, the chorus holds a series of choral workshops, open to the public to participate, at Camp Ogontz in Lyman, NH. The sessions have been directed over the past two decades by Richard Marlow (former organist and choirmaster of Trinity College, Cambridge), Sir David Willcocks (former choirmaster of King's College, Cambridge and The Bach Choir, London), Herbert Bock, and most recently by David Hill (of the BBC Singers, the Bach Choir) and James Litton (former director of the American Boychoir). In August, a special workshop week of singing is held at Ogontz is specifically for the children and teenagers of the Chorus to help prepare them for the upcoming season of music.

The chorus has toured five times internationally, including two tours to Great Britain, one tour to Italy, one tour to Hungary, Austria and the Czech Republic, and most recently, in Germany. As part of its tours, the chorus has performed in Westminster Abbey, King's College Chapel, Canterbury Cathedral, the cathedrals of Milan and Florence, Saint Mark's Basilica (Venice), Saint Peter's Basilica at the Vatican (including the singing of high mass), and performed the Dvořák Requiem with the Westminster Choir as part the closing concert of the 1987 Spoleto Festival of Two Worlds. The chorus toured Hungary, Austria, and the Czech Republic in July 2014, performing the Dvořák Stabat Mater. In 2017, the chorus toured Germany, performing Johann Sebastian Bach's Mass in B minor.

Since 1969, the chorus has rehearsed and performed in what is now the George Kent Performance Hall (the former Immaculate Conception Church building of Westerly). The building (and its main nave/hall), renowned for its exceptional acoustics, is listed on the National Register of Historic Places. From 1889 through 1969, Kent Hall was Westerly's Immaculate Conception Church. From the mid-1970s through 1990, the building was home to the Westerly Center for the Arts. When the Center for the Arts organization folded in 1991, the chorus purchased the building and renamed it the Chorus of Westerly Performance Hall. In September 2005, the chorus completed a $2.5 million renovation and expansion project on the facility thanks to the support of a community capital campaign. The facility was rededicated at that time as the George Kent Performance Hall.

== Summer Pops Westerly ==
Since 1981, the Chorus of Westerly has presented and performed in one of Rhode Island's largest free outdoor music events, Summer Pops. Held in Westerly's Wilcox Park, an historic Victorian strolling park operated by the Westerly Public Library, the event annually attracts over 25,000 annual residents. The program features an hour-long pre-show event featuring local musicians and dancers followed by the main program featuring the entire Chorus, 55 members of the Pops Festival Orchestra, the Newport Artillery, church bells from the local Episcopal church, and a fireworks show by the Grucci Company of Long Island. Summer Pops was started as both a send off and thank you concert prior to the ensemble's 1981 concert tour to Great Britain. Because of its local popularity and early success, the Chorus of Westerly has continued to present the program at the start of summer (usually in late June) every year since 1981.

== Leadership ==
The Chorus of Westerly was founded in 1959 by George Kent. Kent served as music and artistic director for 53 seasons before retiring in June 2012. After a national search in the 2011–12 season, former Chorus child singer Andrew Howell was appointed the organization's second music director. Howell began his post as music director in July 2012.

Ryan Saunders, another former child singer of the chorus, has served as the organization's managing executive director since July 2009.
