= Stephen Wilcox =

American inventor

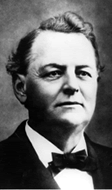
Stephen Wilcox

Stephen Wilcox, Jr. (February 12, 1830 – November 27, 1893) was an American inventor, best known as the co-inventor (with George Herman Babcock) of the water-tube boiler. They went on to found the Babcock & Wilcox Company. He was born in Westerly, Rhode Island. and died in November 1893 at age 63 in Rhode Island. He is the namesake of Wilcox Park.
