= George W. Longstaff =

American architect (1850–1901)

- Born: 1850; England
- Died: January 12, 1901 (aged 50–51); New York City, New York, U.S.
- Occupation: Architect

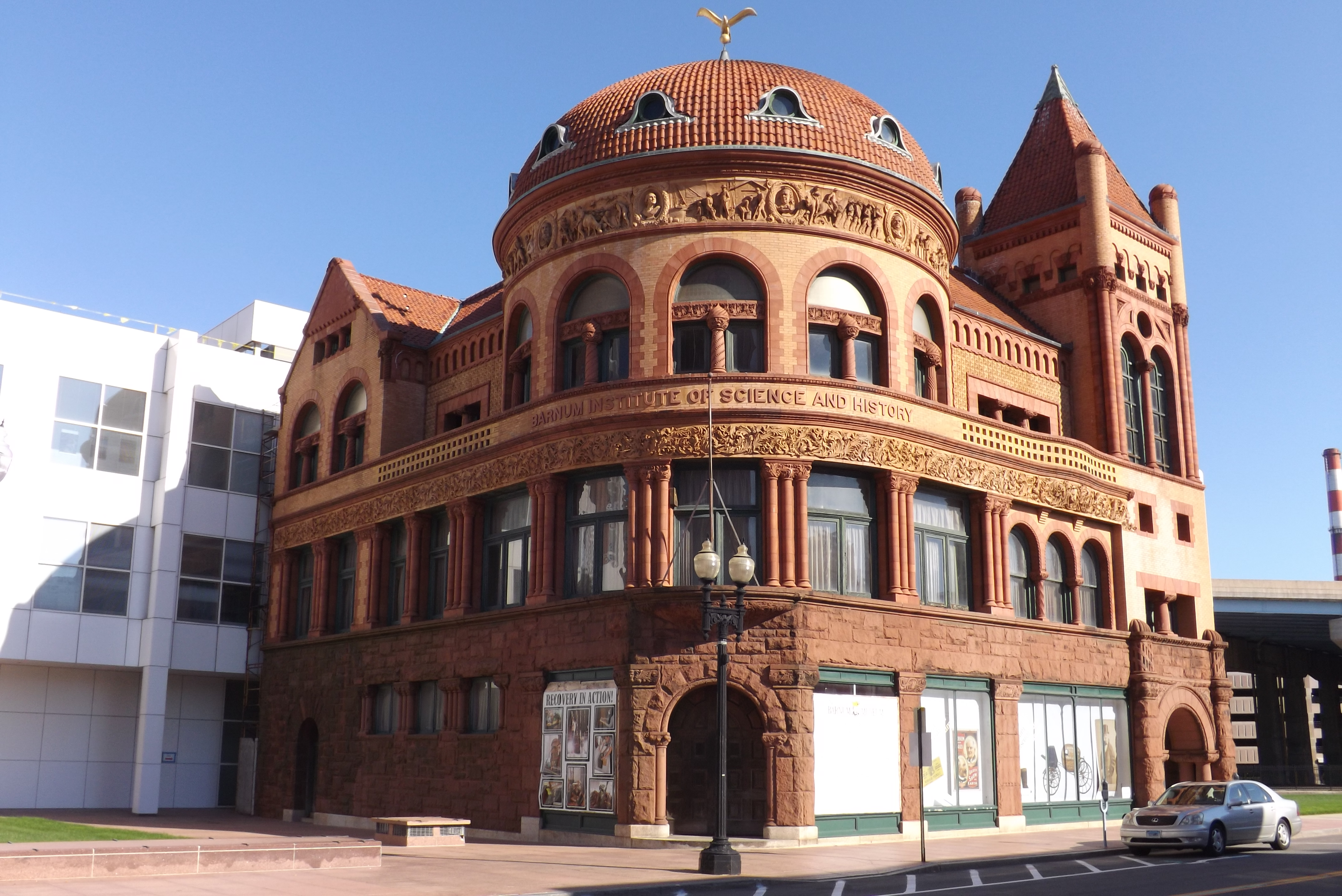
Barnum Institute of Science and History, Bridgeport, 1891.

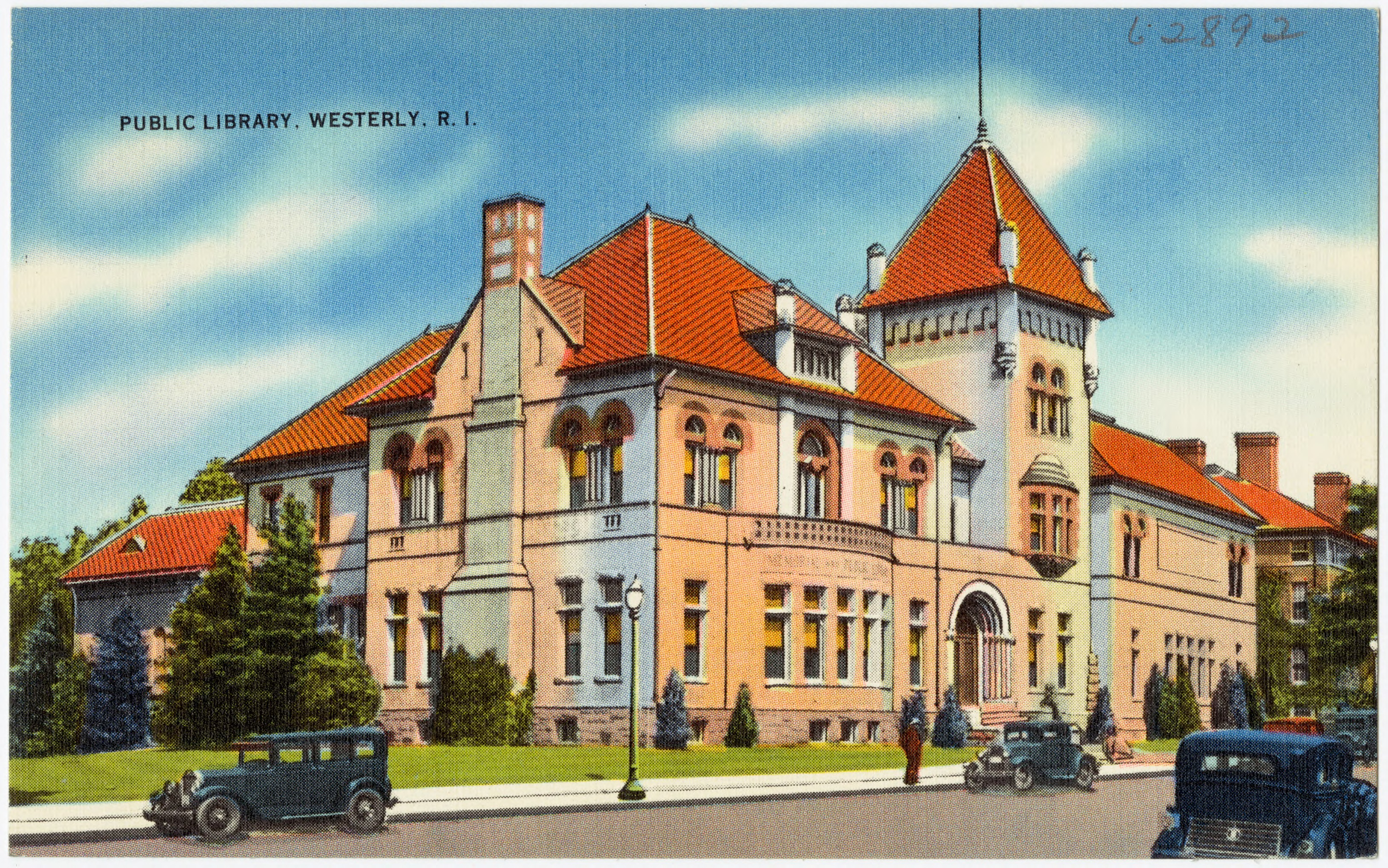
Westerly Memorial and Public Library, Westerly, Rhode Island, 1894.

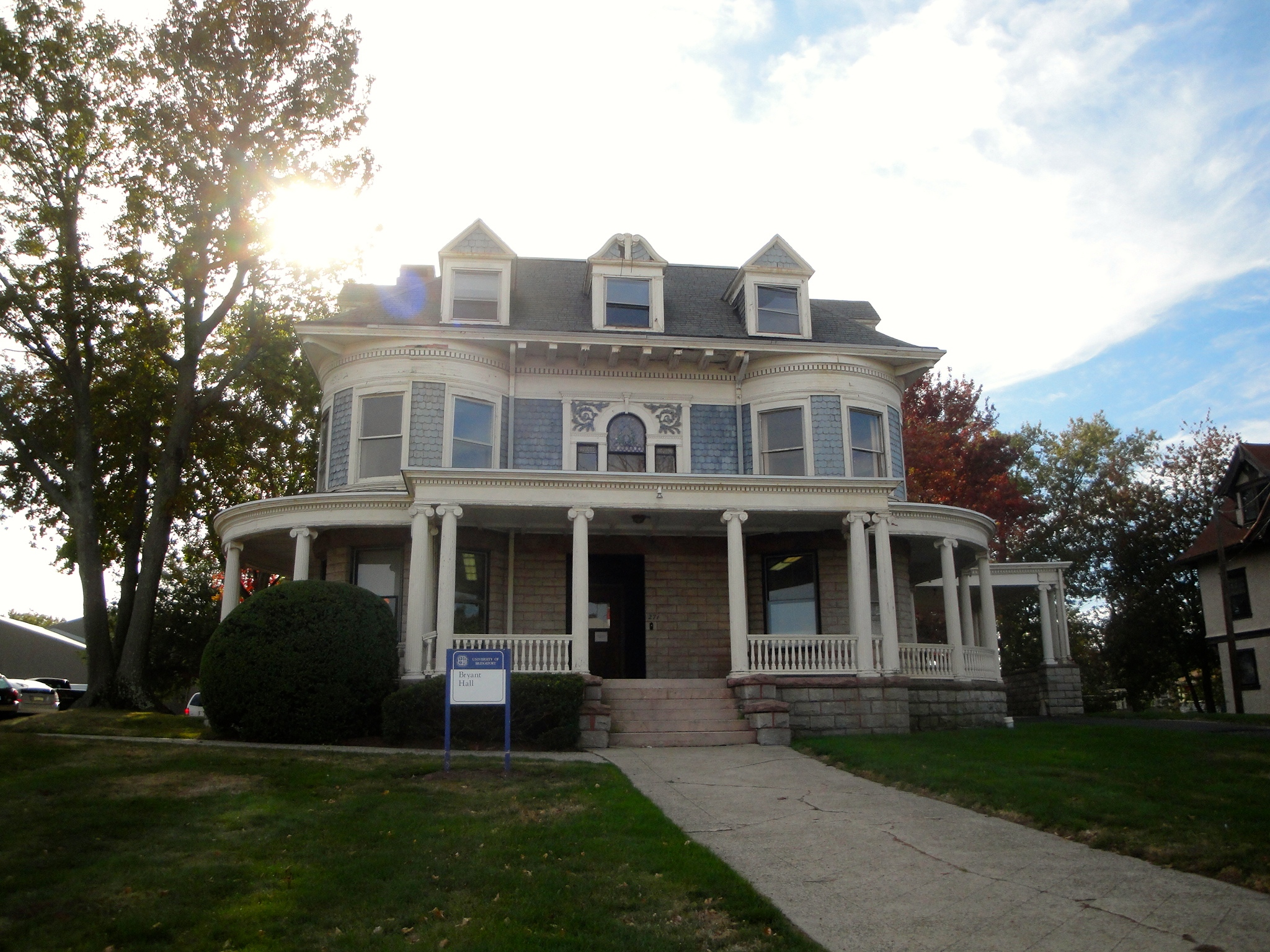
Waldo C. Bryant House, Bridgeport, 1895.

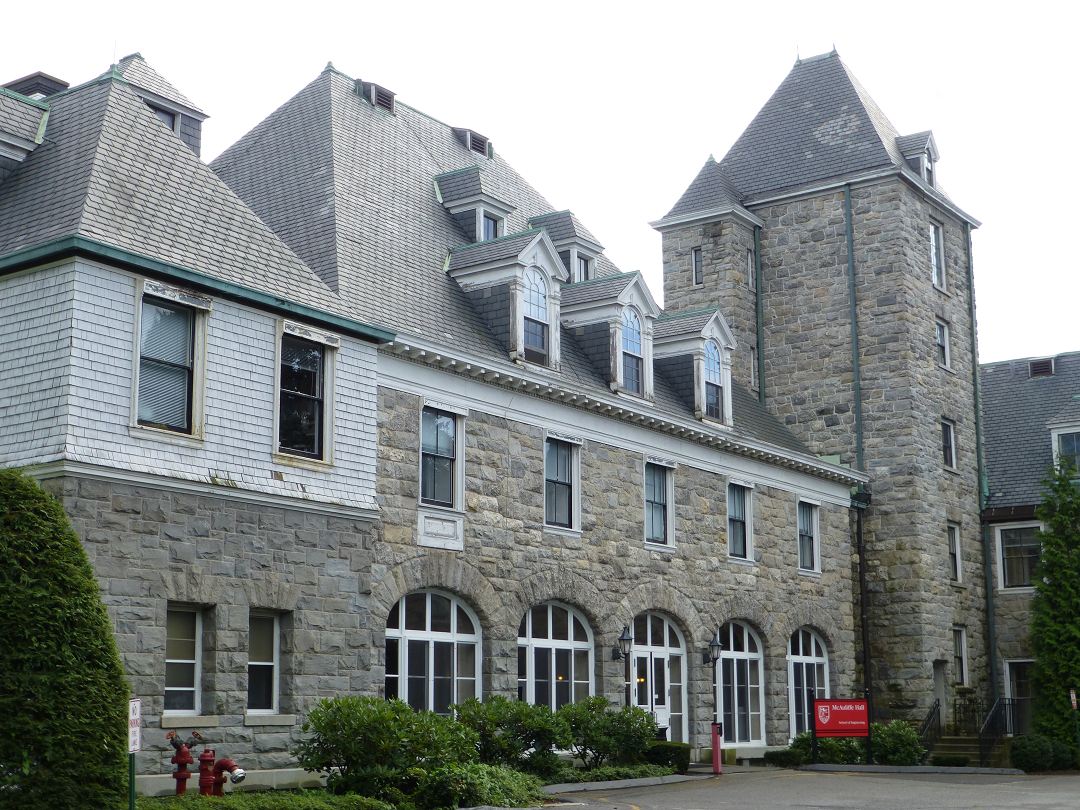
Mailands, Fairfield, 1896.

George W. Longstaff (1850-1901) was an American architect practicing in Bridgeport, Connecticut.

== Life and career ==
George W. Longstaff was born in 1850 in England. In early life he relocated to the United States, eventually arriving in Bridgeport. His education, training, and early career are unknown. Around 1885 he established the partnership of Longstaff & Hurd with Frank W. Hurd (1857-1915), a lumber and millwork dealer. In addition to designing buildings, the firm also dealt substantially in millwork and interior decoration. The firm was dissolved in 1894 after a bankruptcy, brought upon by the Panic of 1893. In 1895 Longstaff formed the G. W. Longstaff Company. This firm was succeeded in 1898 by G. W. & H. Longstaff, with Herbert Longstaff. Longstaff also often served as the contractor or builder on his designs.

He died in New York City January 12, 1901.

== Architectural works ==
=== Longstaff & Hurd, c.1885-1894 ===
- Burroughs Memorial Chapel, St. John's Episcopal Church, 768 Fairfield Ave., Bridgeport, CT (1886–88) - On the north end of the building.
- Sherman H. Hubbard House, 115 Broad St., Bridgeport, CT (1887)
- P. T. Barnum House (Marina), 374 Linden Ave., Bridgeport, CT (1888–89) - Demolished.
- Edinburgh Crescent, 431-449 Washington Ave., Bridgeport, CT (1889)
- Frederick J. Banks House, 803 Clinton Ave., Bridgeport, CT (1890)
- Ingleside, Ingleside Pl., Bridgeport, CT (1890) - Longstaff's own residence until he lost it in 1894. Evidently vacant.
- Sea Side Club, State St. & Lafayette Blvd., Bridgeport, CT (1890) - Demolished.
- Barnum Grammar School, 529 Noble Ave., Bridgeport, CT (1891) - Built with a third floor, now removed.
- Barnum Institute of Science and History, 820 Main St., Bridgeport, CT (1891–93)
- Sanford Building, 16 Cannon St., Bridgeport, CT (1891) - Longstaff & Hurd had their offices here. Demolished.
- Barnum-Thompson Building, 177 State St., Bridgeport, CT (1892)
- Staples Building, 189 State St., Bridgeport, CT (1892)
- Maplewood Avenue School, 434 Maplewood Ave., Bridgeport, CT (1893)
- Wheeler School, 115 Highland Ave., Bridgeport, CT (1893)
- Westerly Memorial and Public Library, 44 Broad St., Westerly, RI (1894)

=== G. W. Longstaff Company, 1895-1898 ===
- Waldo C. Bryant House, 271 Park Ave., Bridgeport, CT (1895) - Now Bryant Hall of the University of Bridgeport.
- Wilmot & Hobbs Manufacturing Co. Factory, Cherry St. & Hancock Ave., Bridgeport, CT (1895) - Demolished.
- Court Exchange Building, 211 State St., Bridgeport, CT (1896)
- Mailands, N. Benson Rd., Fairfield, CT (1896) - A residence of Oliver G. Jennings. Now Fairfield University's McAuliffe Hall.

=== G. W. & H. Longstaff, 1898-1901 ===
- Westerly Memorial and Public Library (Gallery wing), 44 Broad St., Westerly, RI (1898) - Attached to the rear of the 1894 building.
- Edward Fitzgerald House, 480 E. Washington Ave., Bridgeport, CT (1900–01)
- Burroughs Library (Remodeling), 955 Main St., Bridgeport, CT (1900) - Demolished.

== Other work ==
Longstaff also entered, but lost, the architectural competitions for the Clinton Avenue School (1888), Y. M. C. A. Building (1888) and the First Baptist Church (1892), all in Bridgeport. He was also appointed supervising architect for the U. S. Post Office at the corner of Broad & Cannon Streets in 1889. It has been demolished.

The Clinton Avenue School and Y. M. C. A. Building went to Warren R. Briggs, and the First Baptist Church to Joseph W. Northrop.
