= Anthony House =

Anthony House or Anthony Farm may refer to:

in the United States (by state then town)

- David Rinehart Anthony House, Eutaw, Alabama
- Anthony House (Little Rock, Arkansas), a former hotel
- Horace Anthony House, Camache, Iowa
- Anthony House (Adams, Massachusetts)
- David M. Anthony House (Fall River, Massachusetts)
- David M. Anthony House (Swansea, Massachusetts)
- Harold H. Anthony House, Swansea, Massachusetts
- Anthony-Corwin Farm, Long Valley, New Jersey
- Susan B. Anthony Childhood House, Battenville, New York
- Susan B. Anthony House, Rochester, New York, a U.S. National Historic Landmark
- Abraham Anthony Farm, Blackburn, North Carolina
- Herman Anthony Farm, Canby, Oregon, listed on the NRHP in Clackamas County
- John Anthony House, La Grande, Oregon
- Anthony-Buckley House, La Grande, Oregon

== See also ==
- Levi Anthony Building, Cape Vincent, New York
