= David M. Anthony House =

David M. Anthony House may refer to:

- David M. Anthony House (Fall River, Massachusetts)
- David M. Anthony House (Swansea, Massachusetts)
