= Black Rock Gardens Historic District =

Area in Bridgeport, Connecticut, US

- U.S. National Register of Historic Places
- U.S. Historic district
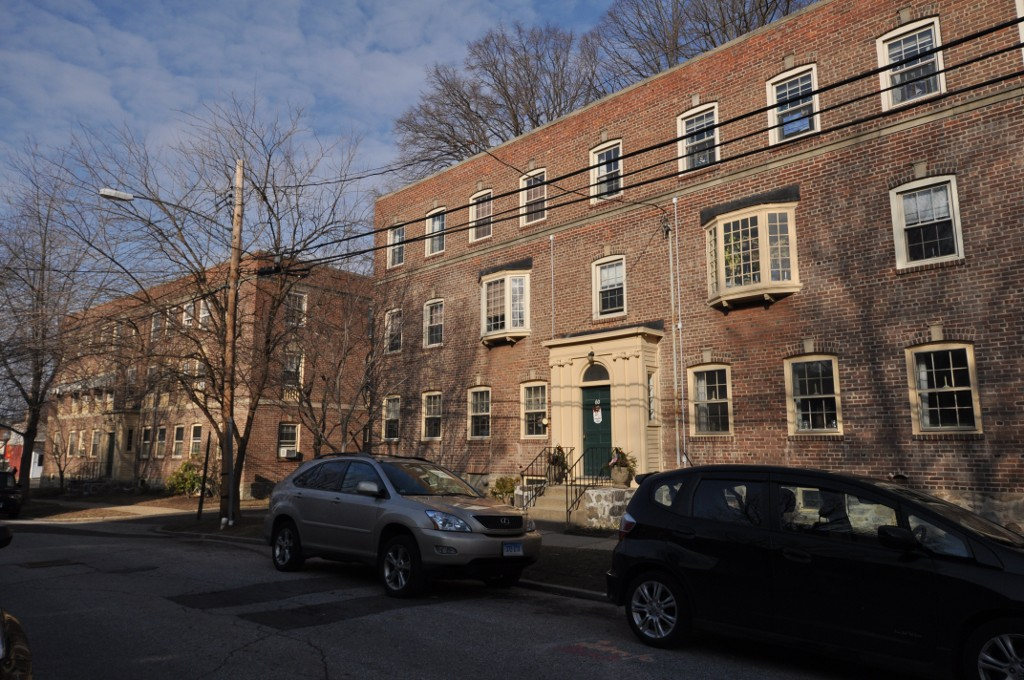
- Haddon Street apartment blocks

- Location within Connecticut Location within the United States
- Location: Bounded by Fairfield Avenue Brewster Street and Nash Lane including Rowsley and Haddon Streets Bridgeport, Connecticut
- Coordinates: 41°9′27″N 73°13′30″W
- Area: 7 acres (2.8 ha)
- Architect: R. Clipston Sturgis; Skinner & Walker
- Architectural style: Colonial Revival
- MPS: Wartime Emergency Housing in Bridgeport MPS
- NRHP reference No.: 90001430
- Added to NRHP: September 26, 1990

The Black Rock Gardens Historic District is a historic district in the Black Rock neighborhood of Bridgeport, Connecticut. It encompasses a small residential development built between 1916 and 1920 to provide housing for workers in war-related industries in the city. It is a well-preserved example of one of several such developments made in the city with funding by the United States Housing Corporation, a government agency. The district was listed on the National Register of Historic Places in 1990.

== Description and history ==
Black Rock Gardens is located in southwestern Bridgeport's Black Rock neighborhood, on 7 acres (2.8 ha) bounded by Fairfield Avenue, Rowsley Street, Haddon Street, Nash Lane, and Brewster Street. It consists of 12 three-story red brick Colonial Revival buildings, set around small quadrangle-like parks. Some of the buildings are connected to one another. The buildings are relatively uniformly styled, with cast stone trim elements, brick parapets, and flat roofs, with some window openings occupied by projecting window bays to provide visual interest. Entrance surrounds have neoclassical features including full entablatures.

The complex was built between 1916 and 1920 by the United States Housing Corporation to provide war-time emergency housing for workers in war-related factories, during World War I. The siting and building design was a collaboration that included R. Clipston Sturgis, Arthur Shurtleff, and Skinner & Walker, and embodied elements of the then-fashionable Garden City movement of residential design.

== See also ==
- History of Bridgeport, Connecticut
- Black Rock Historic District
- National Register of Historic Places listings in Bridgeport, Connecticut
