= Main Street Historic District (Rockland, Maine) =

Historic district in Maine, United States

- U.S. National Register of Historic Places
- U.S. Historic district
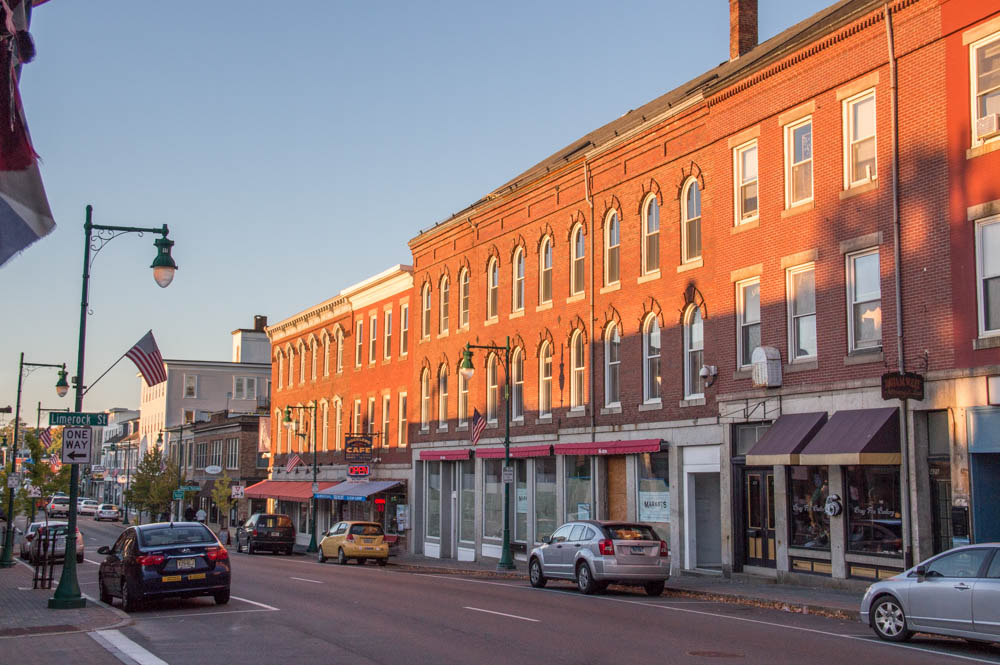

- Location within Maine Location within the United States
- Location: Main St. from Limerock to Winter Sts., Rockland, Maine
- Coordinates: 44°6′14″N 69°6′34″W
- Area: 2.5 acres (1.0 ha)
- Architectural style: Greek Revival, Italianate, Colonial Revival
- NRHP reference No.: 78000182 (original); 11000991 (increase)

Significant dates
- Added to NRHP: June 7, 1978
- Boundary increase: January 4, 2012

The Main Street Historic District encompasses the historic commercial heart of Rockland, Maine. Located on several blocks of Main Street (United States Route 1), the district has a well-preserved collection of commercial architecture dating from the mid-19th to early 20th centuries, the period of the city's height as a shipbuilding and industrial lime processing center. The district was listed on the National Register of Historic Places in 1978, and enlarged in 2012.

== Description and history ==
The area that is now Rockland was settled as part of Thomaston in the late 18th century. The city's harbor proved a good shipbuilding location, and the area's limestone were developed as a locally significant lime-burning industry, with kilns lining parts of the shore. The area was incorporated as East Thomaston in 1848, and reincorporated as the city of Rockport in 1854. The city's early 19th-century downtown was largely destroyed by a series of fires in 1853. As a consequence, the new downtown that was built up with a significant number of Italianate brick buildings.

The historic district, as originally listed in 1978, extended along Main Street, from Winter Street to the municipal parking lot entrance north of Tillson Avenue on the east side, and from Museum Street to Limerock Street on the west side. In 2012, it was extended north to Lindsey Street on the west and Summer Street on the east side. Prominent buildings in the district include the 1912 Colonial Revival Security Trust Building, designed by Boston architect R. Clipston Sturgis, and the 1854 Farnsworth Homestead. a centerpiece of the Farnsworth Art Museum.

== See also ==
- National Register of Historic Places listings in Knox County, Maine
