= Lewis Cabot Estate =

Historic house in Massachusetts, United States

- U.S. National Register of Historic Places
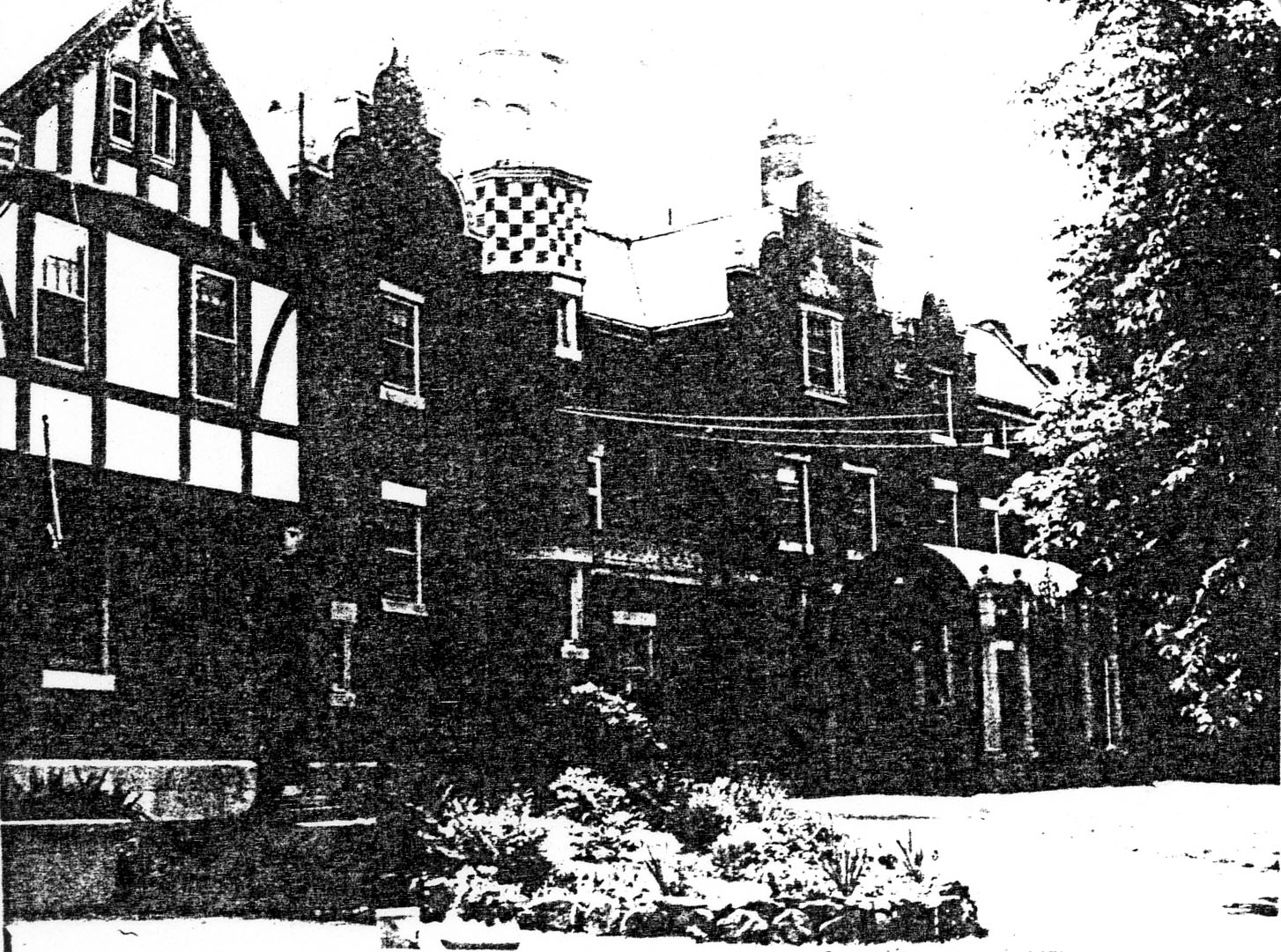
- c. 1980 photo

- Location within Massachusetts Location within the United States
- Location: 514 Warren Street; Brookline, Massachusetts
- Coordinates: 42°19′21.2″N 71°8′35.02″W
- Area: 6 acres (2.4 ha)
- Built: 1895
- Architect: Sturgis, R. Clipston & Cabot, Lewis
- Architectural style: Tudor Revival, Jacobethan Revival
- MPS: Brookline MRA
- NRHP reference No.: 85003251
- Added to NRHP: October 17, 1985

The Lewis Cabot Estate was a historic estate at Warren and Heath Streets in Brookline, Massachusetts. The estate, developed in 1894, was one of few surviving turn-of-the-century properties of the Boston Brahmin Cabot family, and a prominent local example of Jacobethan architecture with landscaping by Frederick Law Olmsted. The remnant portion of the estate was listed on the National Register of Historic Places in 1985; the main house has since been demolished.

== Description and history ==
The Lewis Cabot Estate was located in the suburban residential area of southern Brookline, at the southwest corner of Heath and Warren Streets, and originally consisted of more than 30 acres (12 ha) of land. The estate included a large 39-room mansion house, a carriage house, and a separate servants quarters. The house had elaborate Jacobethan style, including Flemish curved gables with bargeboard, half-timbered stucco sections, and a wrought iron porte-cochere.

The main house was built in 1895 by Lewis Cabot, son of Samuel and Eliza (Perkins) Cabot, on land he had bought in 1881. The house was designed by Cabot in collaboration with R. Clipston Sturgis. The estate was landscaped by the Olmsted Brothers firm, whose offices were nearby. Henry G. Lapham, who acquired the estate in 1914 after Cabot's death, subdivided the grounds, but retained the main house and 12 acres (4.9 ha). His daughter sold the house in 1942 to the Discalced Carmelite Fathers. The property was listed on the National Register in 1985.

In 1989, the property was purchased by next-door neighbors Mitch Kapor and Ellen Poss to prevent from having it bought by an institution. However, they were unable to find a buyer for it, and thus filed a demolition permit for the estate in July 1994. It was approved and the estate was demolished on August 21, 1995, after a delay.

== See also ==
- National Register of Historic Places listings in Brookline, Massachusetts
