= Watertown Savings Bank Building =

Bank building in Watertown, Massachusetts, U.S.

Watertown Savings Bank
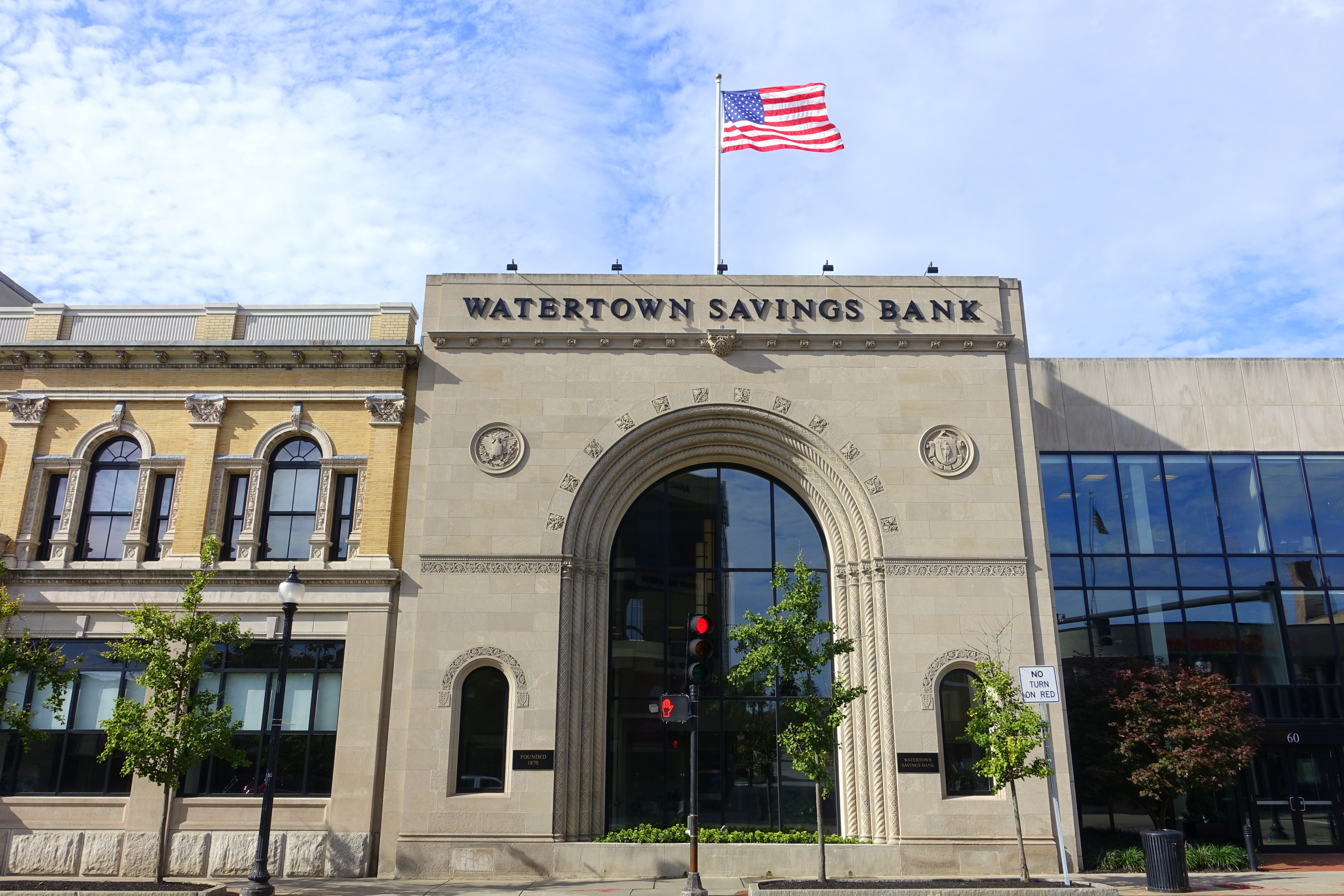
- Main Street frontage in 2019
- Interactive map of the Watertown Savings Bank area

General information
- Architectural style: Renaissance Revival
- Location: 60 Main Street, Watertown, Massachusetts, United States
- Coordinates: 42.366170°N 71.1860905°W
- Completed: 1921 (105 years ago)

Design and construction
- Architect: Richard Clipston Sturgis

The Watertown Savings Bank Building in Watertown, Massachusetts, United States, was completed in 1921. The building stands on Main Street (U.S. Route 20), with another entrance at 1 Galen Street, overlooking Watertown Square, and replaced another bank building on the site. Richard Clipston Sturgis was the building's architect, to a design in the Renaissance Revival style.

Watertown Savings Bank opened on November 10, 1870, as the first bank in the City of Watertown.

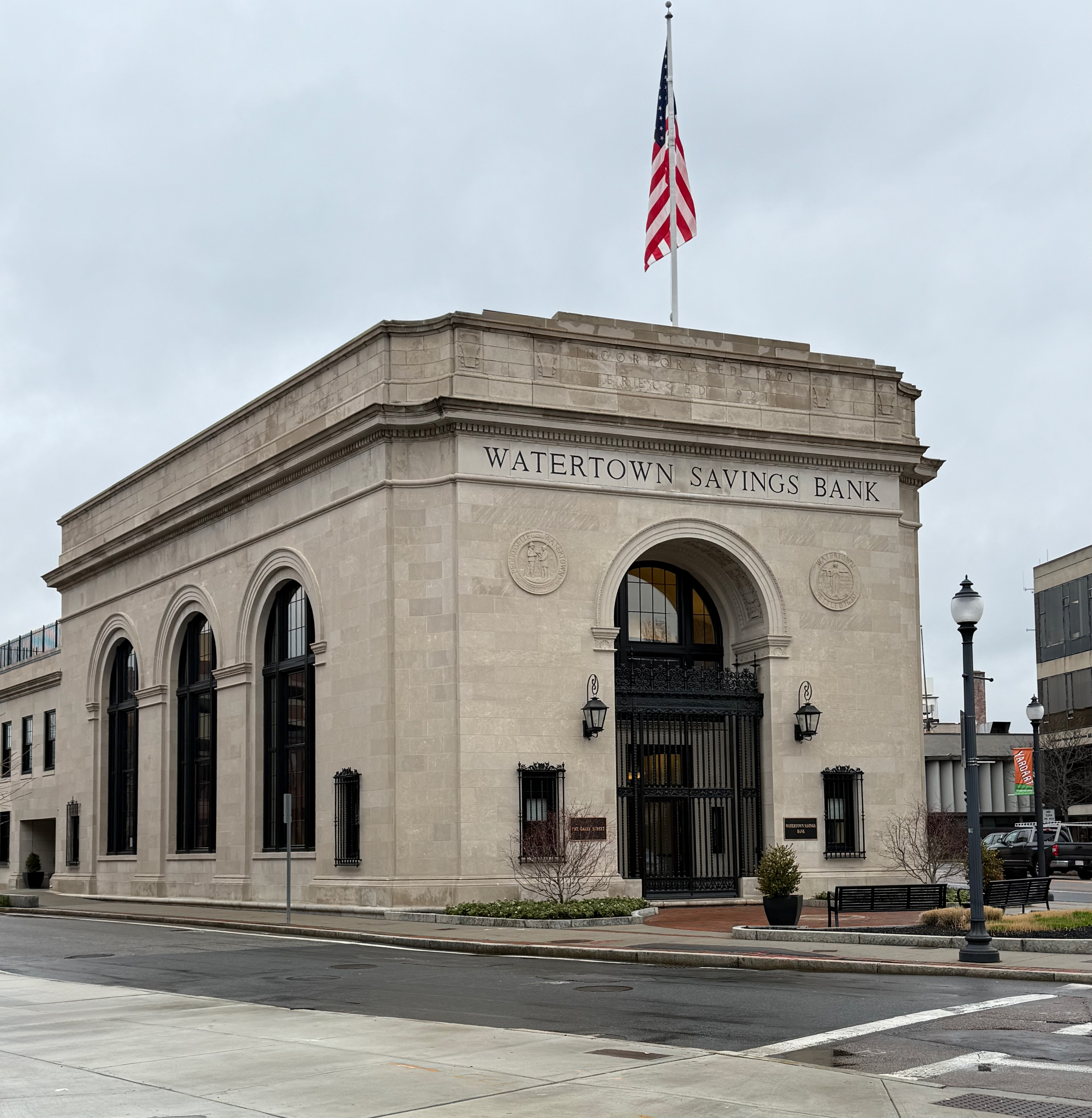
The Galen Street elevation overlooking Watertown Square
