= Richard Clipston Sturgis =

American architect

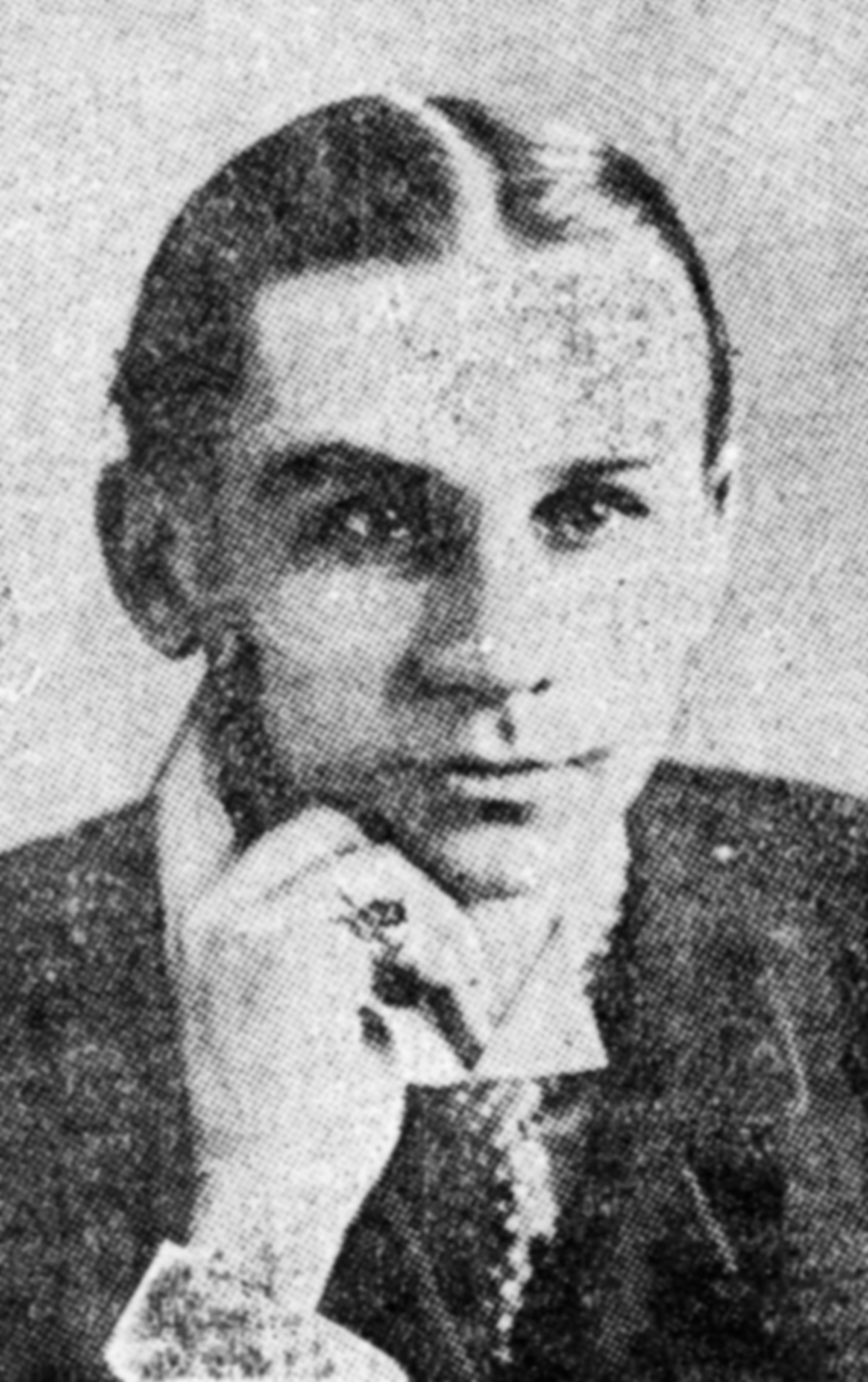
- Sturgis in The Boston Globe in 1910
- Born: December 24, 1860; Boston, Massachusetts, U.S.
- Died: May 8, 1951 (aged 90); Portsmouth, New Hampshire, U.S.
- Occupation: Architect
- Buildings: Lewis Cabot Estate; Cathedral of St. Mary and St. John; Winsor School; Security Trust Building; Federal Reserve Bank of Boston; Harold H. Anthony House
- Design: Perkins School for the Blind; Boston Common Tablet; Menotomy Hunter fountain and grounds
- Education: Harvard College (1881)
- Relatives: Russell Sturgis (grandfather); John Hubbard Sturgis (uncle); Henry Parkman Sturgis (uncle); Julian Sturgis (uncle); Howard Overing Sturgis (uncle); Charles Russell Codman (uncle); Julian Codman (cousin)

4th President of The Society of Arts and Crafts of Boston
- In office 1917–1920
- Preceded by: Herbert Langford Warren
- Succeeded by: John Endicott Peabody

15th President of the American Institute of Architects
- In office 1913–1915
- Preceded by: Walter Cook
- Succeeded by: John Mauran

President of the Boston Society of Architects
- In office 1908–1912
- Preceded by: J. Randolph Coolidge Jr.
- Succeeded by: Ralph Adams Cram

Richard Clipston Sturgis (December 24, 1860 – May 8, 1951), generally known as R. Clipston Sturgis, was an American architect based in Boston, Massachusetts.

== Life and career ==
Richard Clipston Sturgis was born December 24, 1860, in Boston, Massachusetts, to Russell and Susan Codman (Welles) Sturgis. His grandfather was merchant Russell Sturgis and uncles included architect John Hubbard Sturgis, politician Henry Parkman Sturgis, author Julian Sturgis, and novelist Howard Sturgis. He was educated in the private school of George Washington Copp Noble in Dedham, Massachusetts. He entered Harvard College in 1877, graduating in 1881. From 1881 to 1883, he worked in the office of his uncle, Sturgis & Brigham. He then sailed to England, where he worked until late 1884 for London architect Robert William Edis, then engaged on an extension to Sandringham House. After leaving Edis, he spent two years touring Europe. In August 1886, his uncle dissolved his partnership, and the younger Sturgis returned to Boston to help manage the office.

In May 1887, John Hubbard Sturgis returned to his native England to manage his father's affairs, with the younger Sturgis left in charge in Boston. In February 1888, his uncle died in England, and the younger Sturgis succeeded to the practice. He was responsible for completing his uncle's unfinished works, including the Church of the Advent and the new building of the Boston Athletic Association. In May, he formed a partnership with William Robinson Cabot, son of architect Edward Clarke Cabot, known as Sturgis & Cabot. This continued until it was dissolved in May 1895, after which Sturgis continued alone.

In July 1902, he formed a new partnership with George Edward Barton, known as Sturgis & Barton. In addition to a Boston office this firm also had a New York office at Tuxedo Park. This partnership was dissolved after a period of six years. He again was sole proprietor of his firm until 1922, when he reorganized his firm as The Office of R. Clipston Sturgis, with William Stanley Parker, William B. Coffin, William Adams, S. Winthrop St. Clair, and Alanson Hall Sturgis, his nephew, as associates.

Ten years later, in 1932, Sturgis retired. The firm was then reorganized as Sturgis Associates Inc. Parker was head of the new firm, though Sturgis remained associated as a consultant.

Sturgis was regarded as a leader in the architectural profession. In 1891, he was elected to the College of Fellows of the American Institute of Architects. From 1908 to 1912, he was president of the Boston Society of Architects. In 1913-14, he was first vice president of the American Institute of Architects, and president in 1914-15. He was also involved in the Society of Arts and Crafts of Boston, and served as its fourth president from 1917 to 1920. Other organizations to which Sturgis belonged include: the Harvard Clubs of Boston and New York City, the Somerset Club, the Tavern Club, the Union Boat Club, the Loyal Legion, the English-Speaking Union, the Colonial Society of Massachusetts and the American Academy of Arts and Sciences.

From 1902 until 1909, Sturgis was a member of the Board of School-house Commissioners of the School-house Department, a department of the Boston city government that had charge of the selection of sites, appointment of architects and supervision of construction of new schools throughout Boston.

== Personal life ==
Sturgis married in 1882 to Esther Mary Ogden of Troy, New York. They had two sons, one of whom died in infancy, and one daughter. His surviving son, Richard Clipston Sturgis Jr., was born March 17, 1884, at Canterbury in Kent, England. He followed in his father's footsteps, attending Harvard College after which he worked for Parker & Thomas in Boston and Howard & Galloway in San Francisco before joining his father's office in 1907. He died October 18, 1913, at his parents' home in Boston following a sudden illness. Their daughter, Dorothy Margaret (Sturgis) Harding was born July 28, 1891. She was also a designer and was noted in particular for her bookplates.

After retiring from active practice, Sturgis moved to Portsmouth, New Hampshire, where the family had formerly spent only their summers. The family home, known as Martine Cottage, was bought by Sturgis in 1890. He died there on May 8, 1951, at the age of 90. His wife, Esther Mary, had died November 23, 1935, at Winsley in Wiltshire, England, while traveling abroad.

His sketchbooks and notebooks are archived in the Boston Athenæum.

== Architectural works ==
=== Perkins School for the Blind ===
Among Sturgis' most significant commissions was the new campus of the Perkins School for the Blind in Watertown, Massachusetts.

Sturgis was asked to design the campus when third director of the school Edward Allen found its current home in Watertown, Massachusetts. Sturgis chose the popular style of the time called English Collegiate Gothic when designing the campus. Allen required Sturgis to incorporate a "family-style" cottage system implemented by Samuel Gridley Howe. This cottage system was meant to replicate the idea of a family setting and help teach student independent living skills (Activities of Daily Life). This cottage style included students of all ages living together in a family like unit with "four teachers, a cook, and a household assistant oversaw 20 students in each cottage". While the structure of cottage style living has somewhat changed from its first implementation at the school, this cottage style of living still exists at Perkins.

Sturgis also considered the unique mobility needs of students with visual impairments and designed the building to reflect this.

1. He used many right angles to help with orientation. Right angles help students more easily understand cardinal direction at any given time.
2. Equidistant corridors: Each side of the building mirrors the other meaning the student can cognitively map one side of the building and then because of their mirroring know the other side of the building as well.
3. Stairs on the sides of corridors: To help predictability of where a student can find stairs.
4. Sightly tilted walkways: To help the student understand if their straight line of travel has been affected.
5. Animal tiles on columns: To serve as a tactile marker of a space aiding in orientation (knowing where one is). Think of it like a sign for someone who is visually impaired- braille was not used at Perkins at this time)
6. Rosettes carved into the wood of the seats in the chapel: To again be used as a tactile marker

=== List of architectural works ===
- Willard School, Quincy, Massachusetts (1889–91)
- Lewis Cabot Estate, Brookline, Massachusetts (1894, NRHP 1985, demolished 1995)
- "Petersfield" for John Stewart McLennan, Westmount, Nova Scotia (1899, demolished)
- Sturgis House, Groton School, Groton, Massachusetts (1899)
- Big Tree Swimming Pool, Cambridge, Massachusetts (1900, demolished 1962)
- Royal Cape Breton Yacht Club, Sydney, Nova Scotia (1901, burned 2013)
- Cathedral of St. Mary and St. John (former), Manila, Philippines (1905–07, destroyed 1945)
- "Rock Ridge" for Lewis Stuyvesant Chanler, Tuxedo Park, New York (1905)
- "Sunny Rock" for Ambrose Monell, Tuxedo Park, New York (1905) (Note: Later expanded under the direction of architects Walker & Gillette.)
- House for Victor Fremont Lawson, Chicago, Illinois (1906, demolished 1929)
- First National Bank Building, Boston, Massachusetts (1907–08, demolished)
- Franklin Union Building, Boston, Massachusetts (1907–08)
- Neighborhood Guild, Peace Dale, Rhode Island (1907–08)
- Public Library of Brookline, Brookline, Massachusetts (1909–10)
- Winsor School, Boston, Massachusetts (1909–10)
- Perkins School for the Blind, Watertown, Massachusetts (1910–11)
- Security Trust Company Building, Rockland, Maine (1911–12, NRHP 1978)
- Restoration of Old North Church, Boston, Massachusetts (1912–14)
- Robbins Memorial Town Hall, Arlington, Massachusetts (1912)
- Whitinsville Social Library, Whitinsville, Massachusetts (1912–13)
- Boston Common Tablet, Boston Common, Boston, Massachusetts (1913)
- Brimmer School (former), Boston, Massachusetts (1914) (Note: Now occupied by the Park Street School.)
- Delta Upsilon Club (former), Cambridge, Massachusetts (1914–15) (Note: Later the local Elks lodge, now the Ikeda Center.)
- Additions to the Massachusetts State House, Boston, Massachusetts (1914–17) (Note: Designed in association with Robert Day Andrews and William Chapman.)
- Union Congregational Church, East Walpole, Massachusetts (1915)
- Ford Hall, Williston Northampton School, Easthampton, Massachusetts (1916–17)
- Proctor High School (former), Proctor, Vermont (1916–17)
- Black Rock Gardens, Bridgeport, Connecticut (1918, NRHP 1990) (Note: A project of the United States Housing Corporation. Designed in association with planner Arthur Asahel Shurcliff and architects Skinner & Walker.)
- Lakeview Village, Bridgeport, Connecticut (1918, NRHP 1990) (Note: A project of the United States Housing Corporation. Designed in association with planner Arthur Asahel Shurcliff and architect Andrew Hopewell Hepburn.)
- Seaside Village, Bridgeport, Connecticut (1918, NRHP 1990) (Note: A project of the United States Housing Corporation. Designed in association with planner Arthur Asahel Shurcliff.)
- Wilmot Apartments, Bridgeport, Connecticut (1918, NRHP 1990)
- Bird School (former), East Walpole, Massachusetts (1919)
- Watertown Savings Bank Building, Watertown, Massachusetts (1921)
- Federal Reserve Bank of Boston Building (former), Boston, Massachusetts (1920–22)
- Harold H. Anthony House, Swansea, Massachusetts (1922, NRHP 1990)
- Restoration of the First Universalist Church (former), Salem, Massachusetts (1924)
- Vermont Marble Company Office Building, Proctor, Vermont (1924)
- House for William Henry Claflin Jr., Belmont, Massachusetts (1925)
- Amos A. Lawrence School, Brookline, Massachusetts (1929–30)
- Charles/MGH station, Boston, Massachusetts (1931–32, mostly demolished 2004)
- McCall Junior High School, Winchester, Massachusetts (1931–32)
- Watertown Administration Building, Watertown, Massachusetts (1931–32)

=== Other works ===
- Rensselaer Polytechnic Institute coat of arms (1904)
- Menotomy Hunter fountain and grounds, Arlington, Massachusetts (1911)
- Robbins Memorial Flagstaff, Arlington, Massachusetts (1913) Collaborative work with Cyrus Dallin.
- Boston Common Tablet, Boston Common, Boston, Massachusetts (1913)

== Gallery of architectural and design works ==
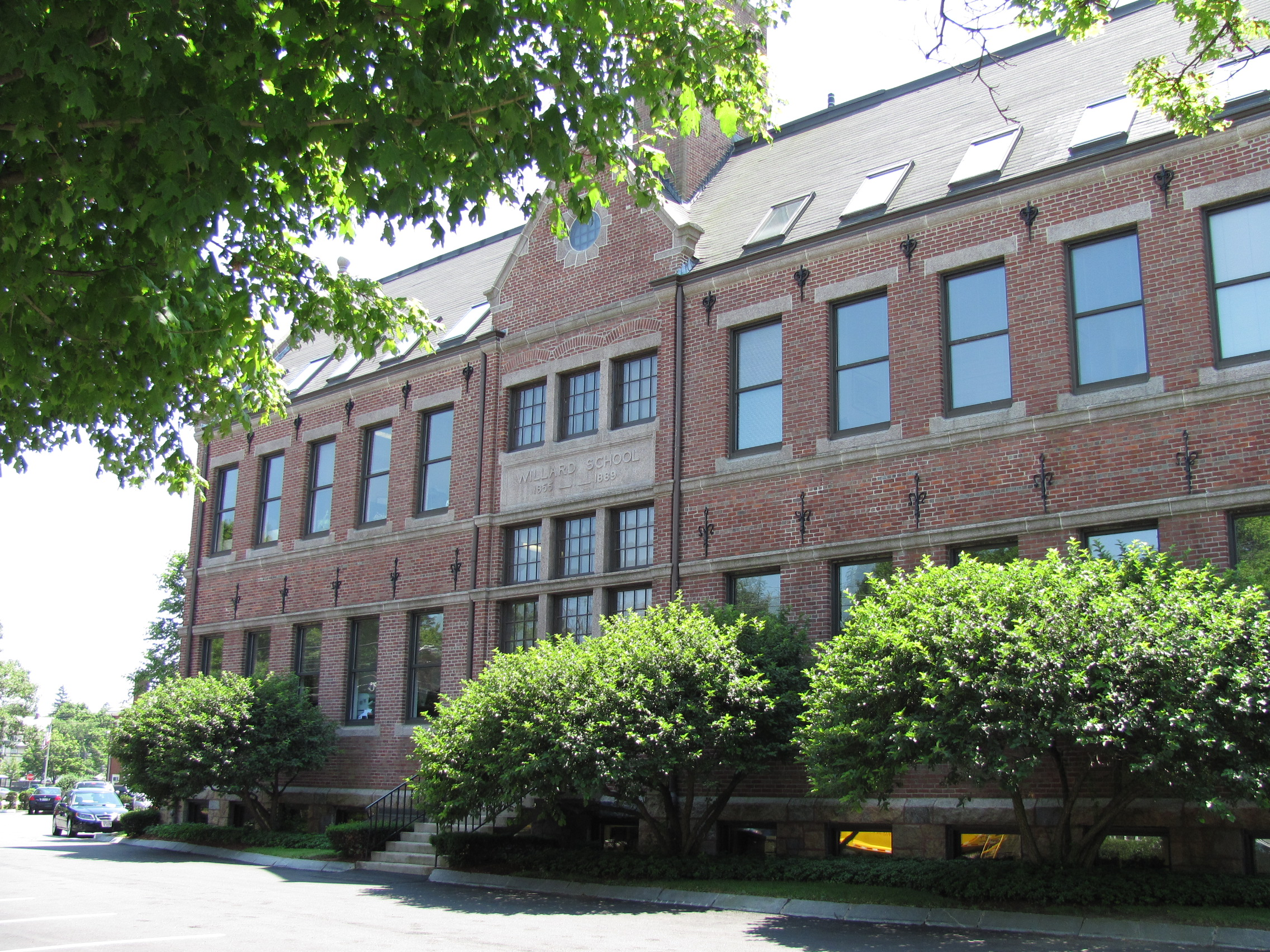
Willard School, Quincy, Massachusetts, 1889-91.

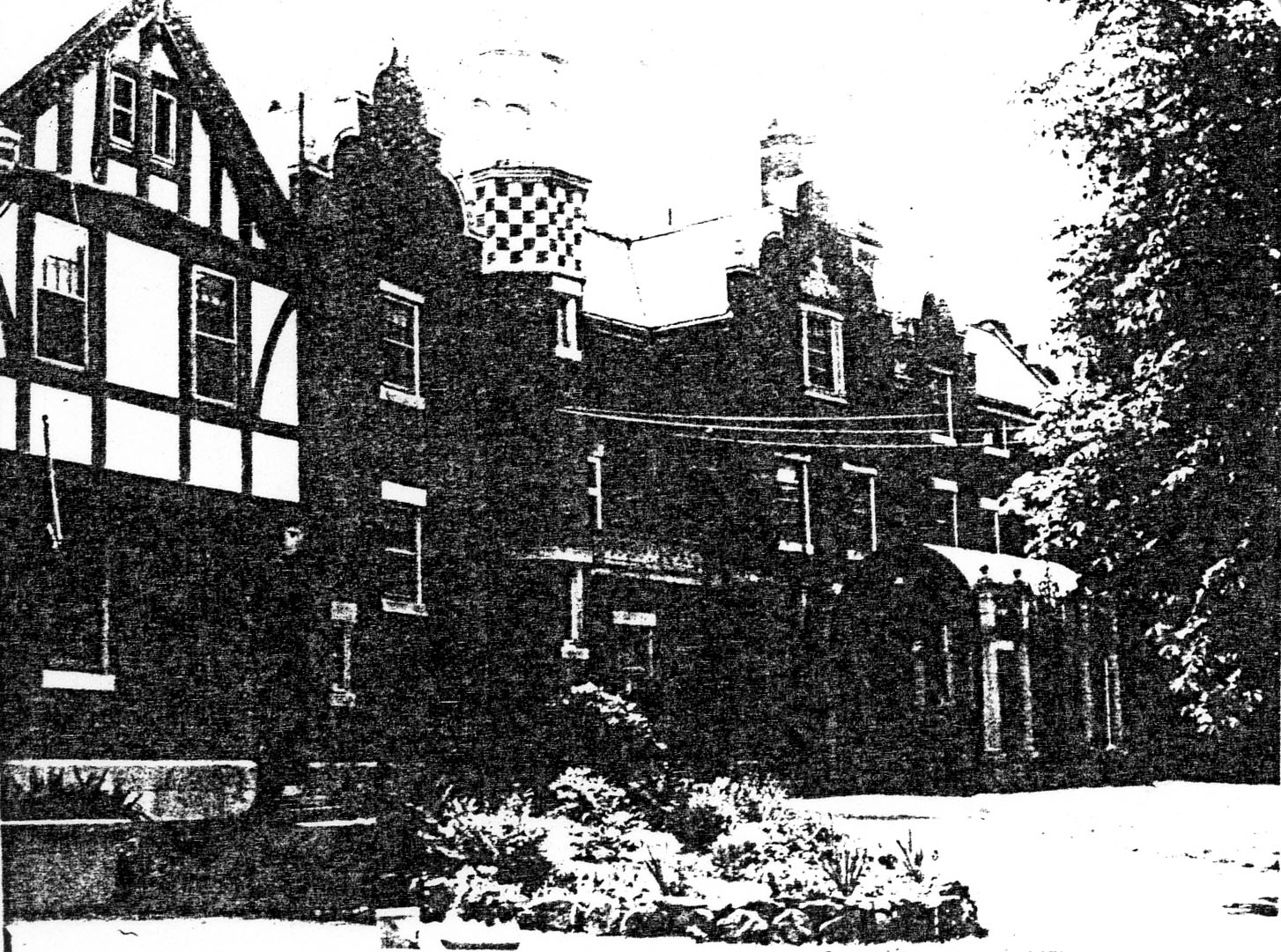
House for Lewis Cabot, Brookline, Massachusetts, 1894.

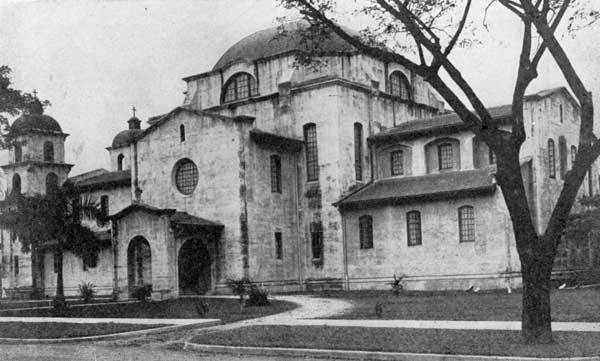
Cathedral of St. Mary and St. John, Manila, Philippines, 1905-07.

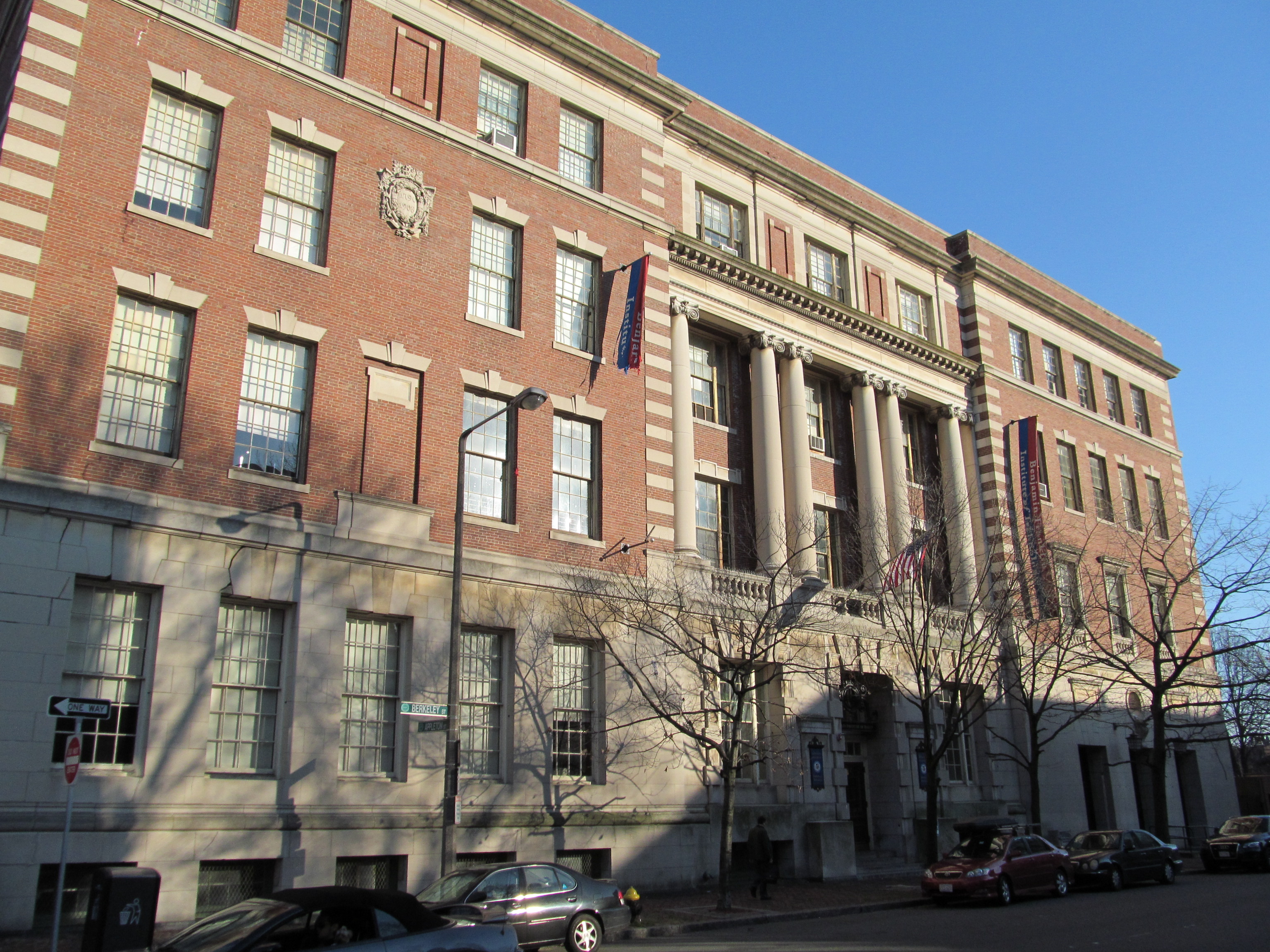
Franklin Union Building, Boston, Massachusetts, 1907-08.

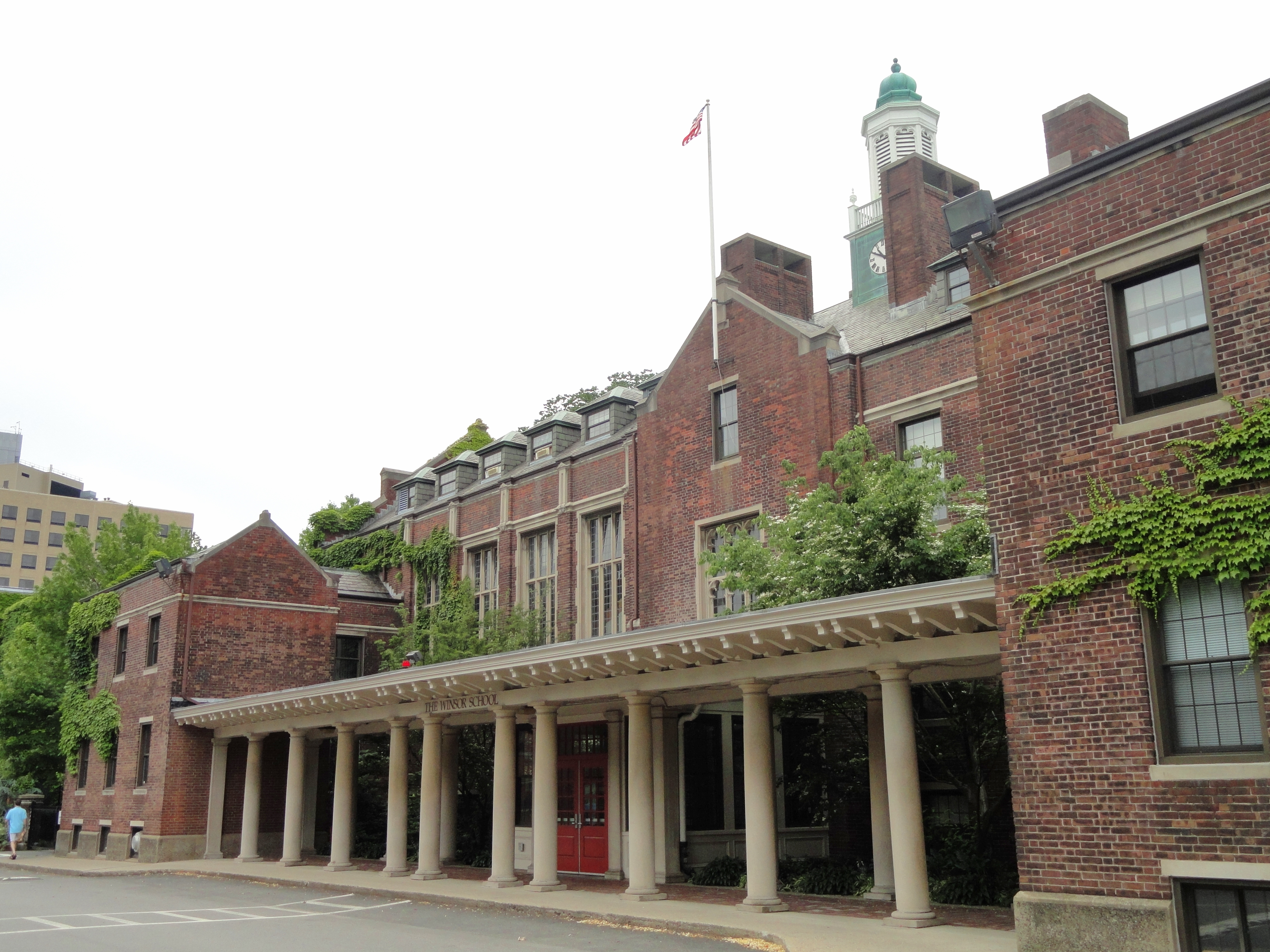
Winsor School, Boston, Massachusetts, 1909-10.

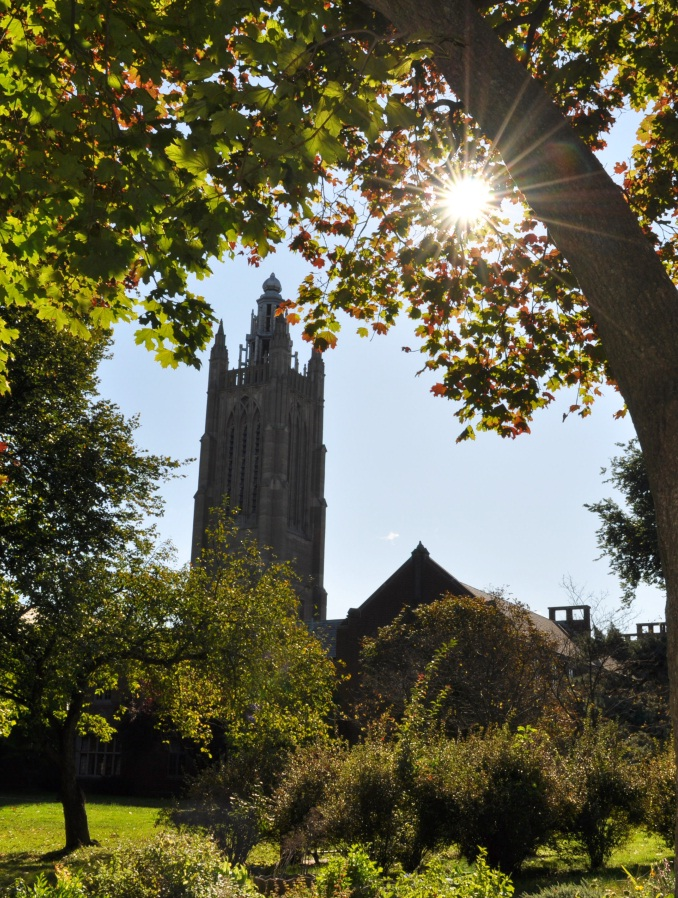
Perkins School for the Blind, Watertown, Massachusetts, 1910-11.

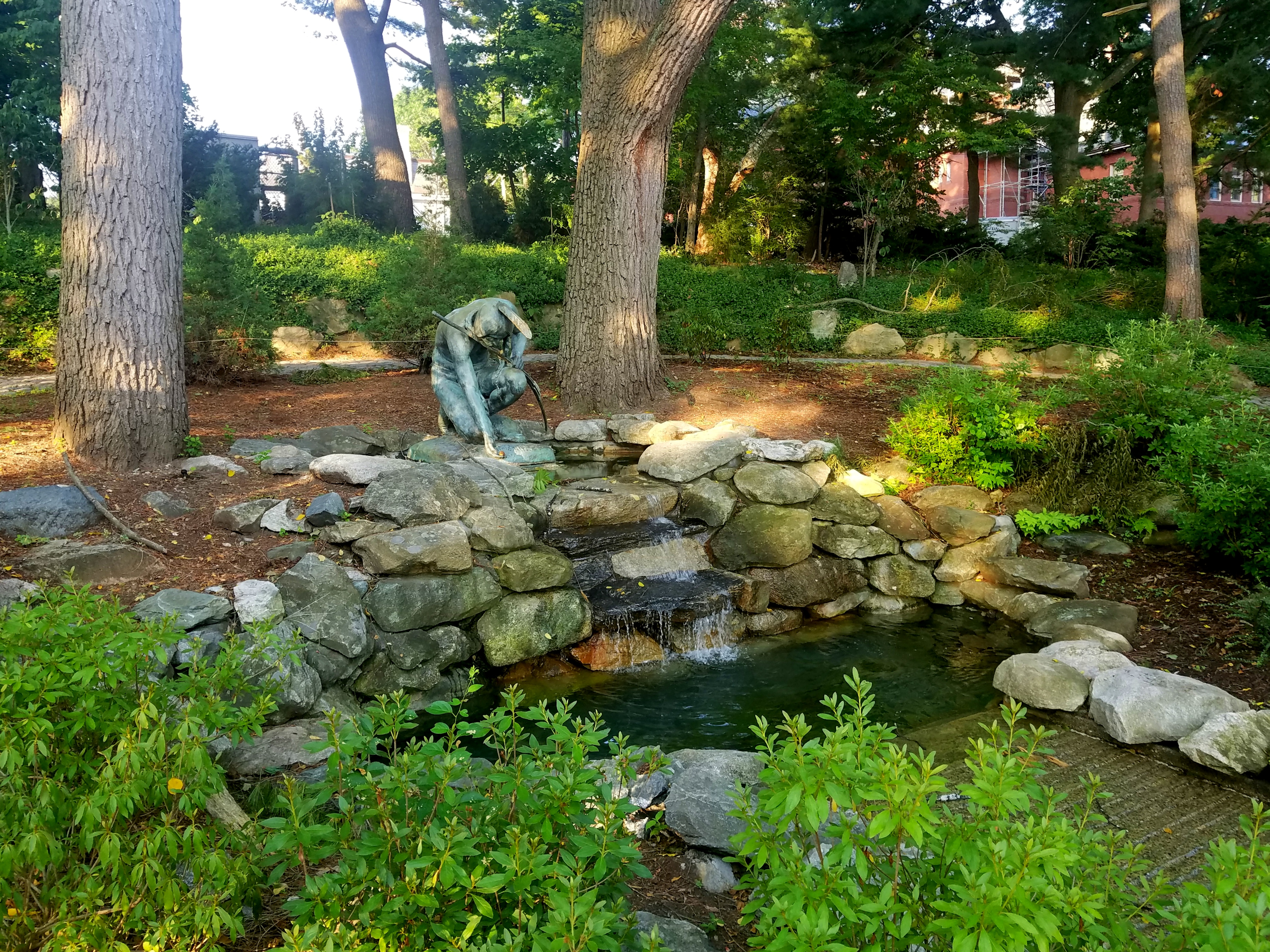
Menotomy Hunter fountain and grounds, Arlington, Massachusetts, 1911.

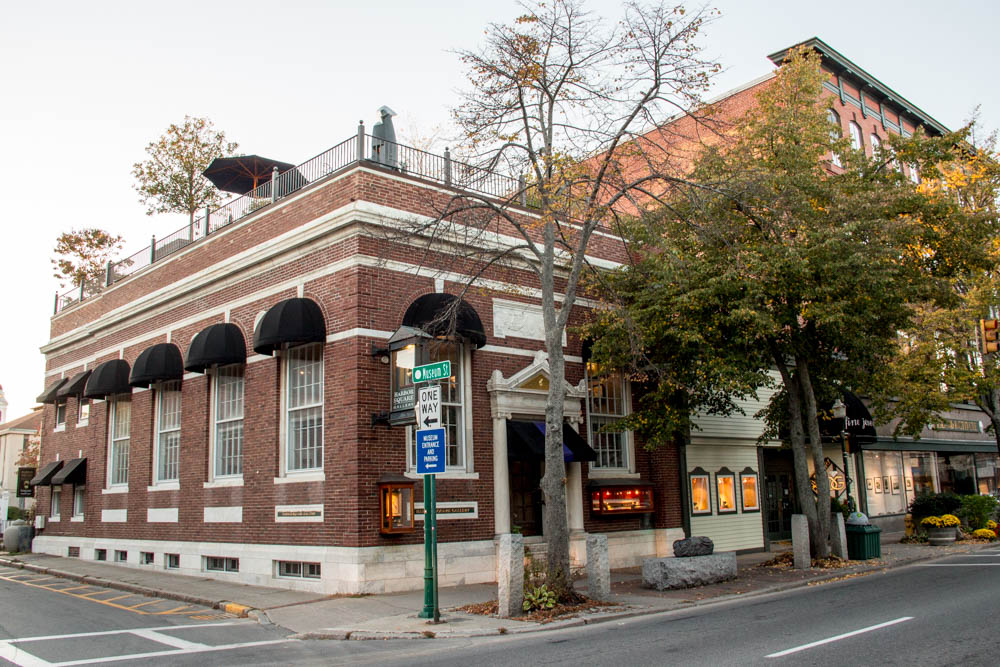
Security Trust Company Building, Rockland, Maine, 1911-12.

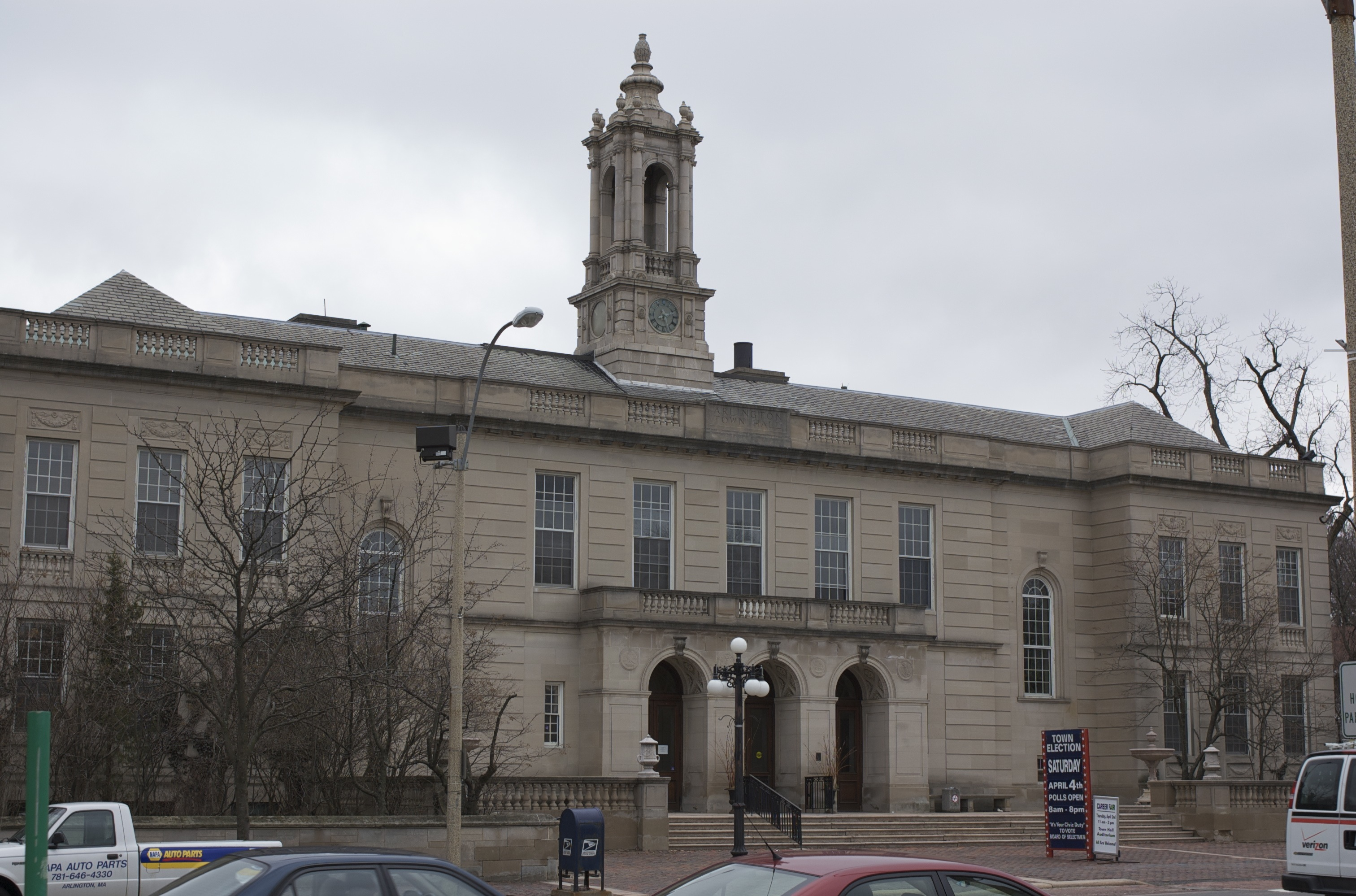
Robbins Memorial Town Hall, Arlington, Massachusetts, 1912.

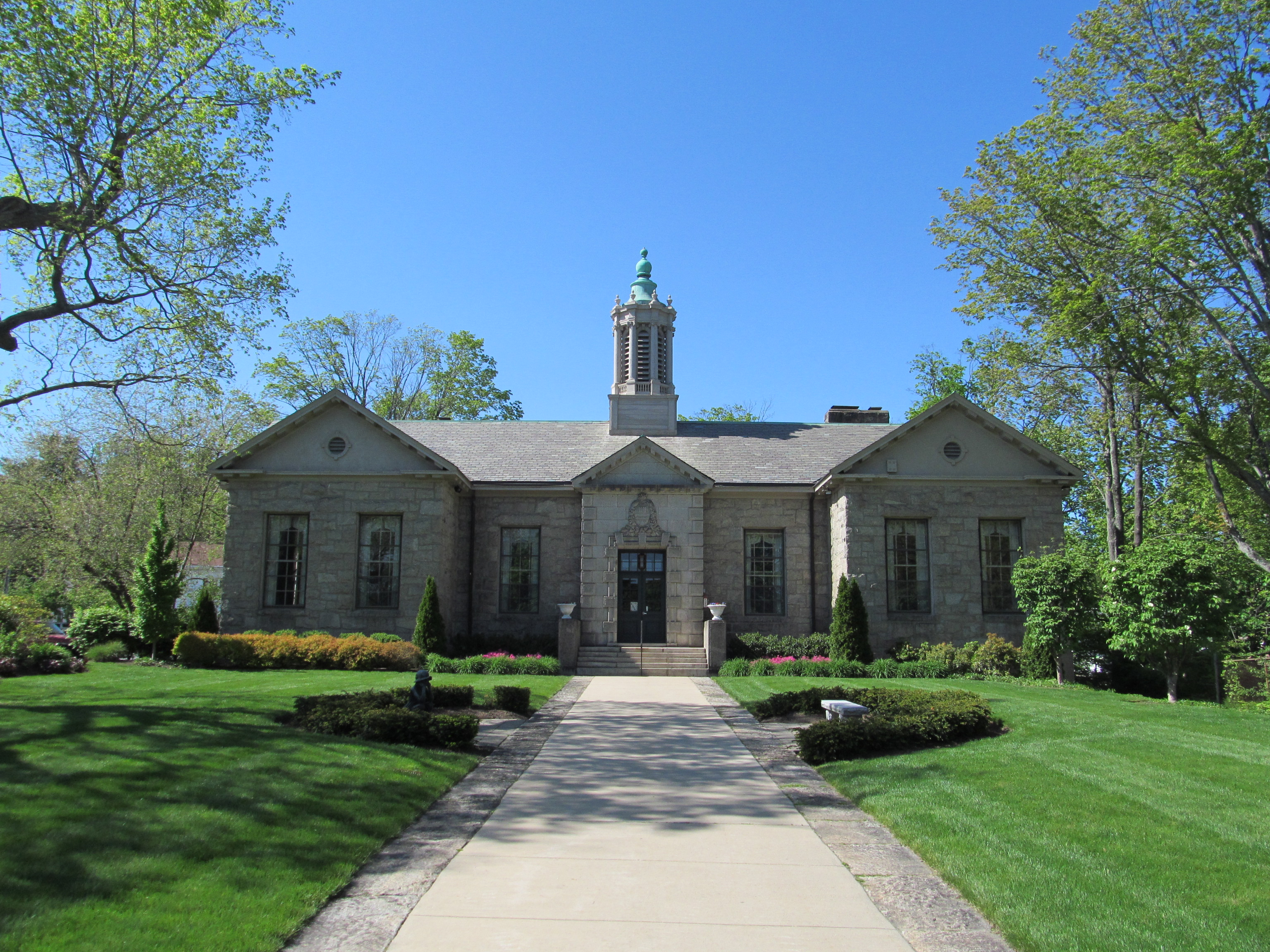
Whitinsville Social Library, Whitinsville, Massachusetts, 1912-13.

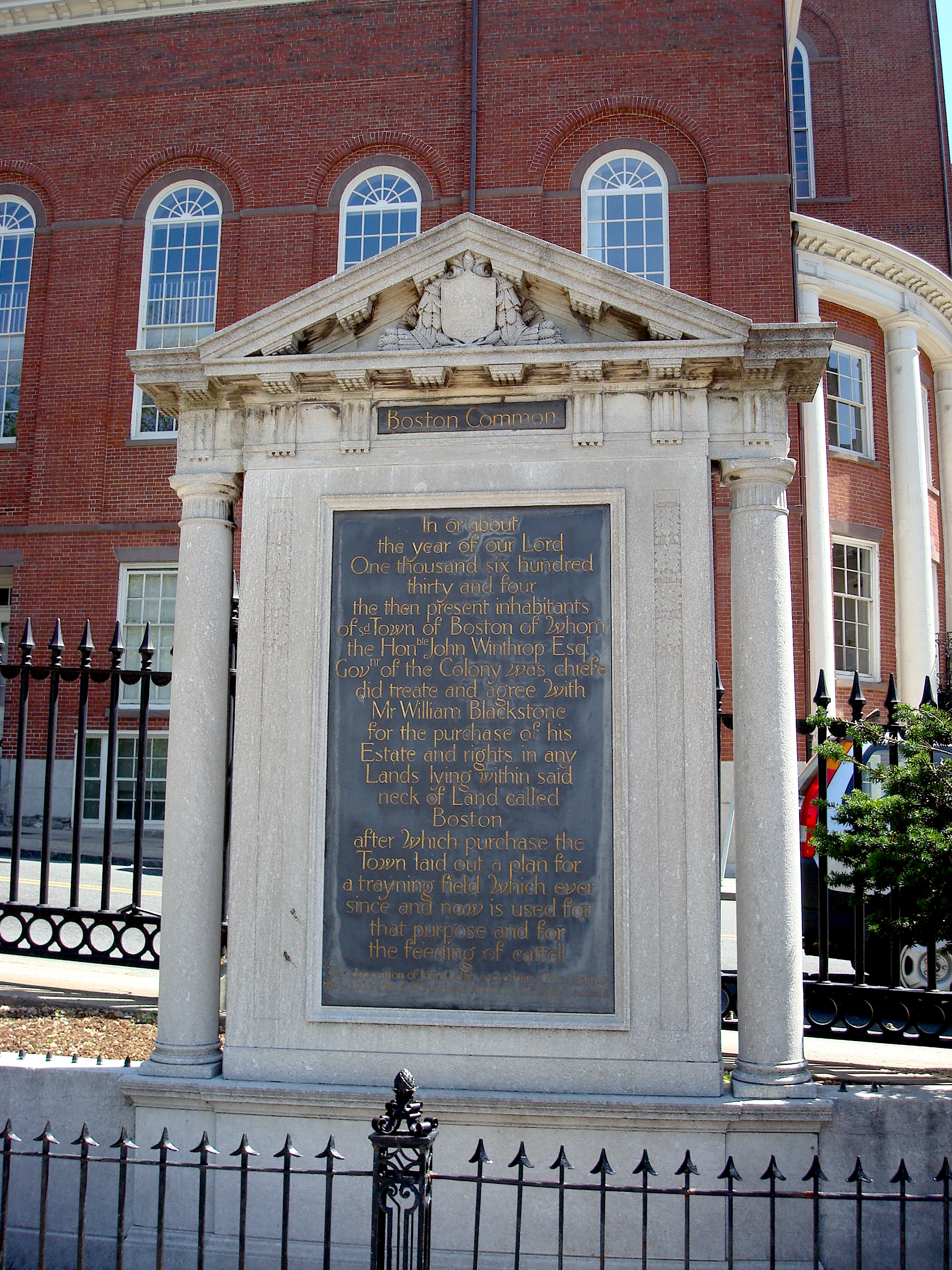
Boston Common Tablet, Boston Common, Boston, Massachusetts, 1913.

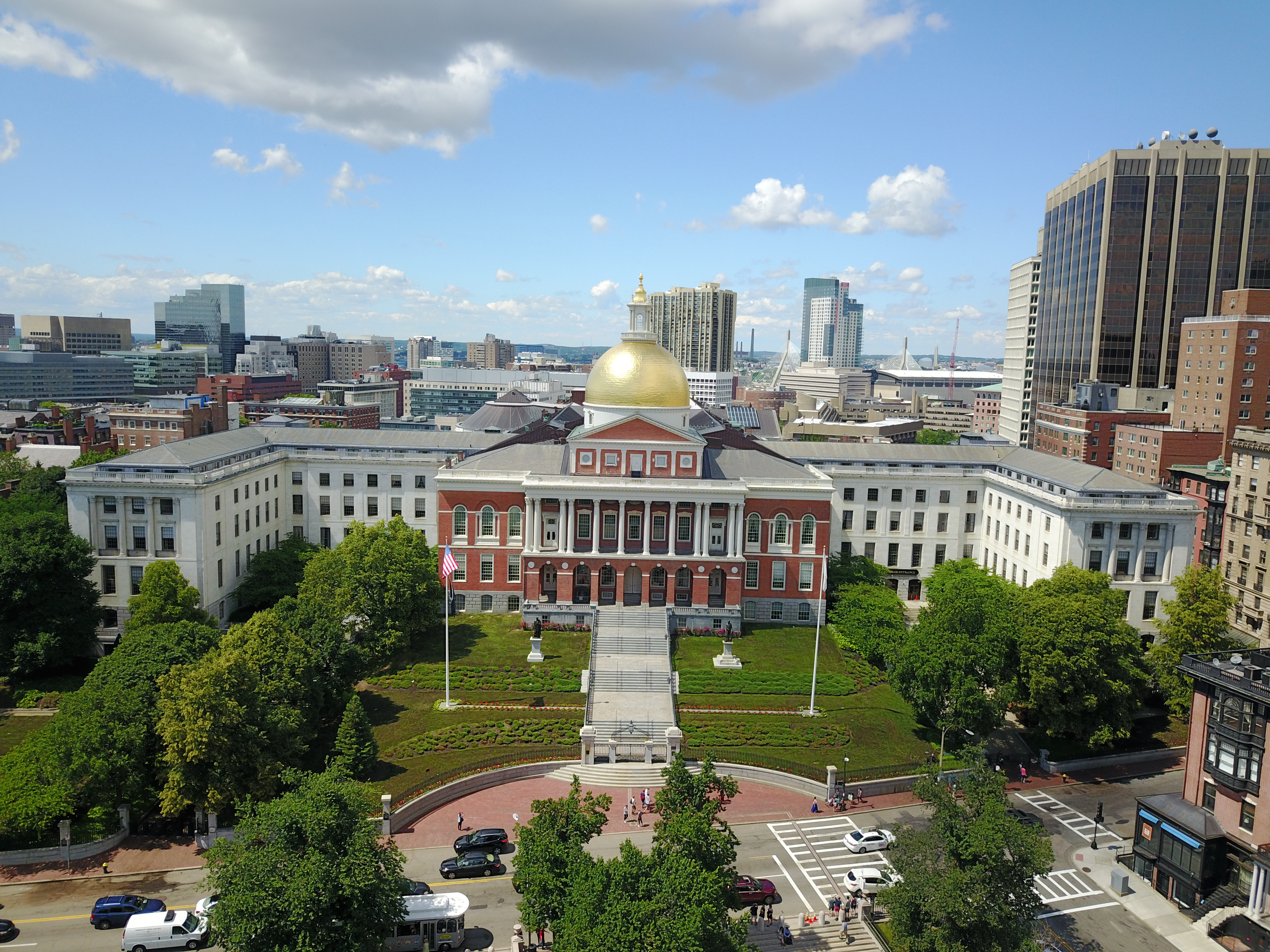
Additions to the Massachusetts State House, Boston, Massachusetts, 1914-17.

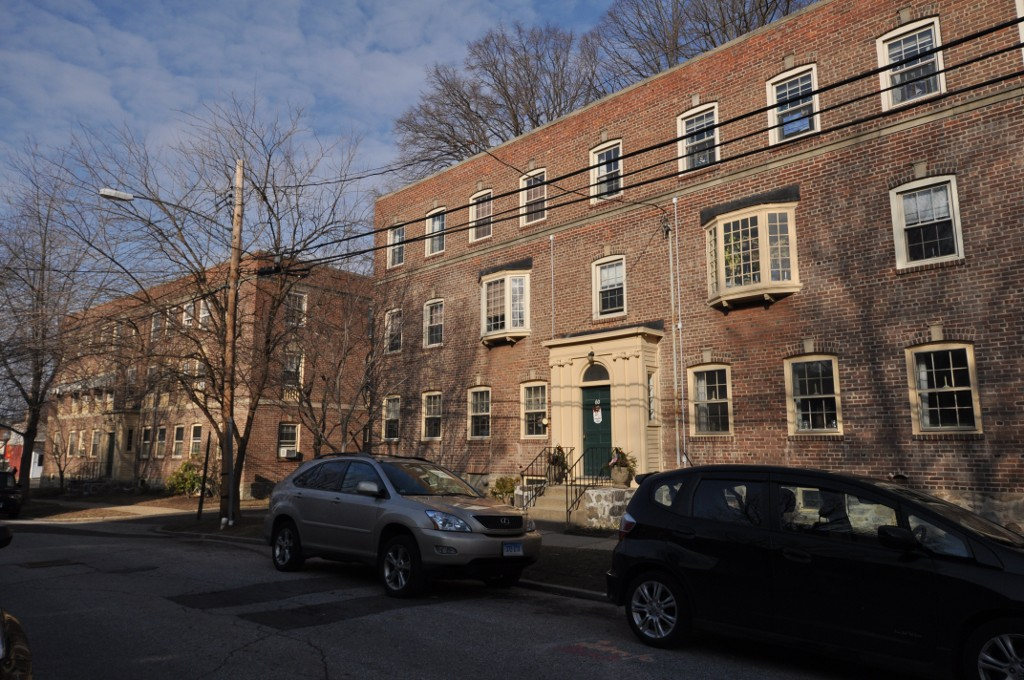
Black Rock Gardens, Bridgeport, Connecticut, 1918.

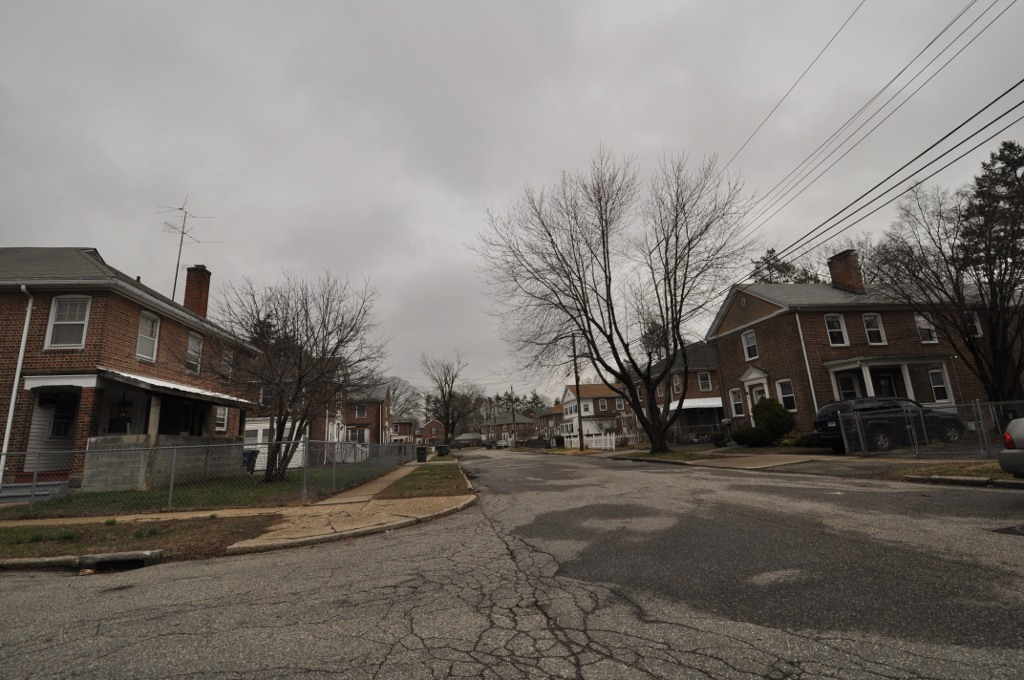
Lakeview Village, Bridgeport, Connecticut, 1918.

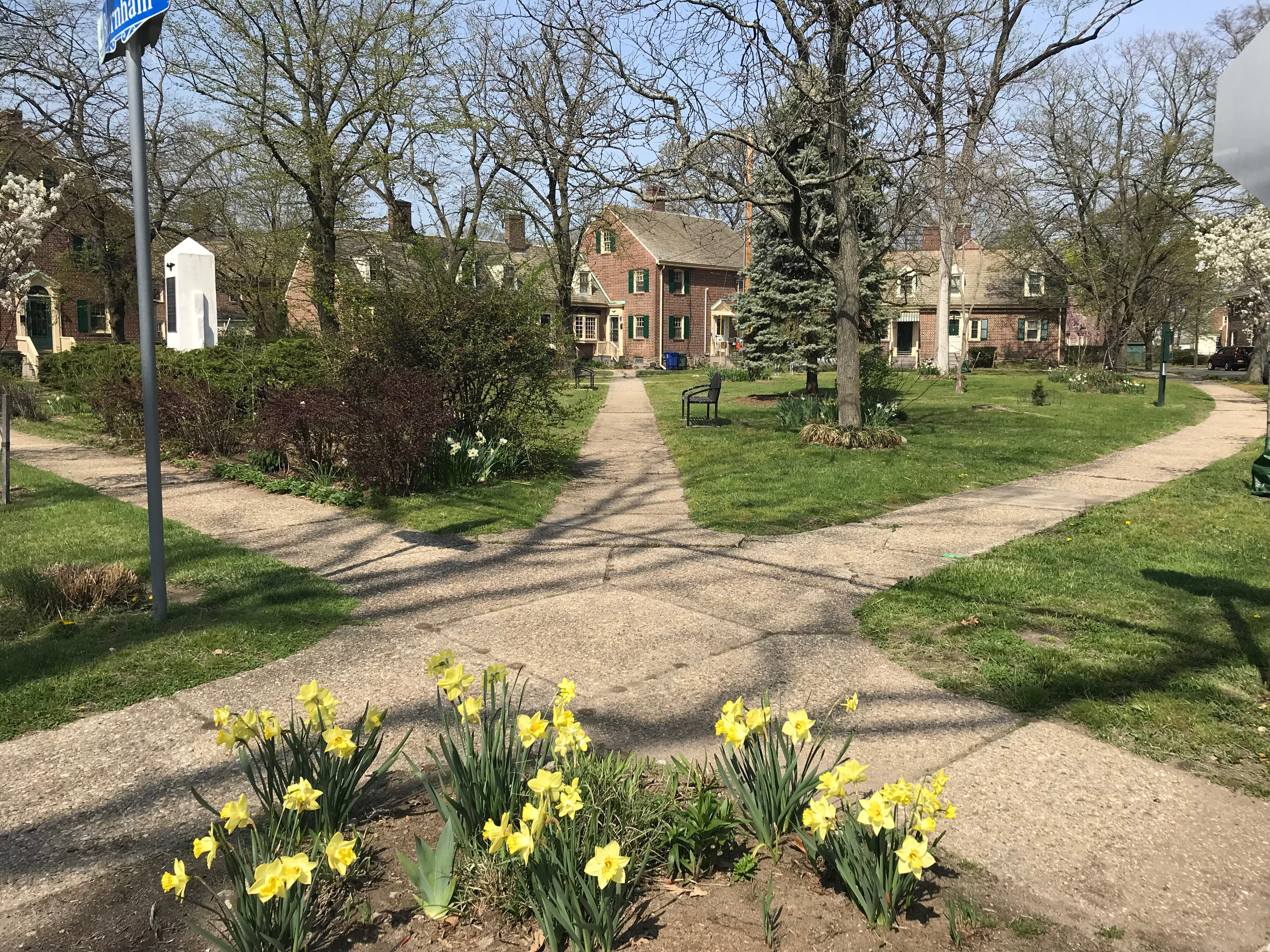
Seaside Village, Bridgeport, Connecticut, 1918.

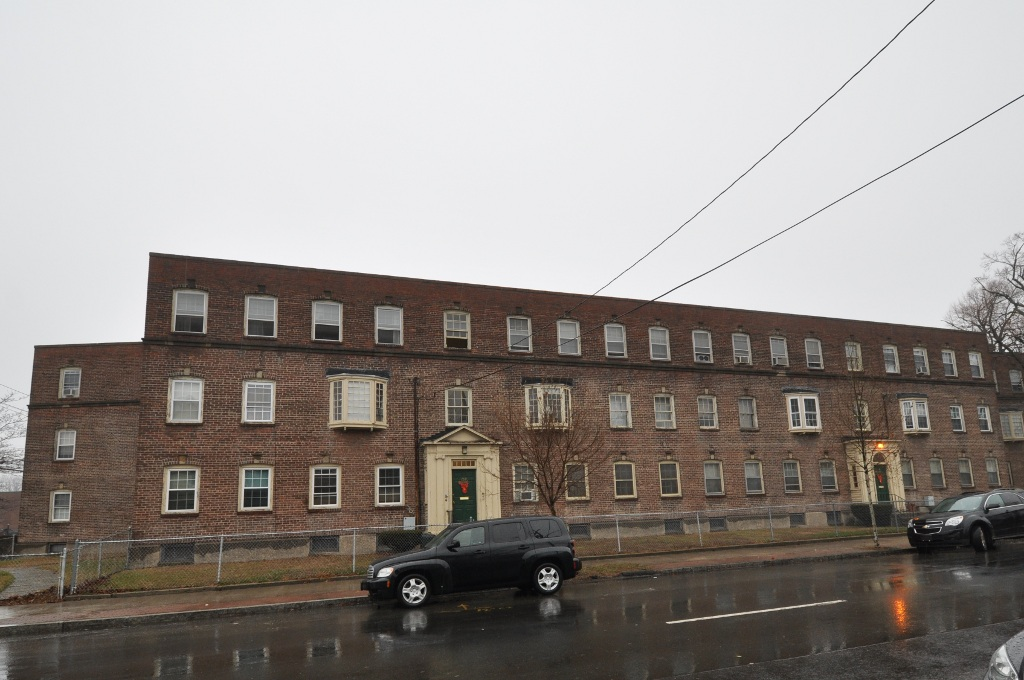
Wilmot Apartments, Bridgeport, Connecticut, 1918.

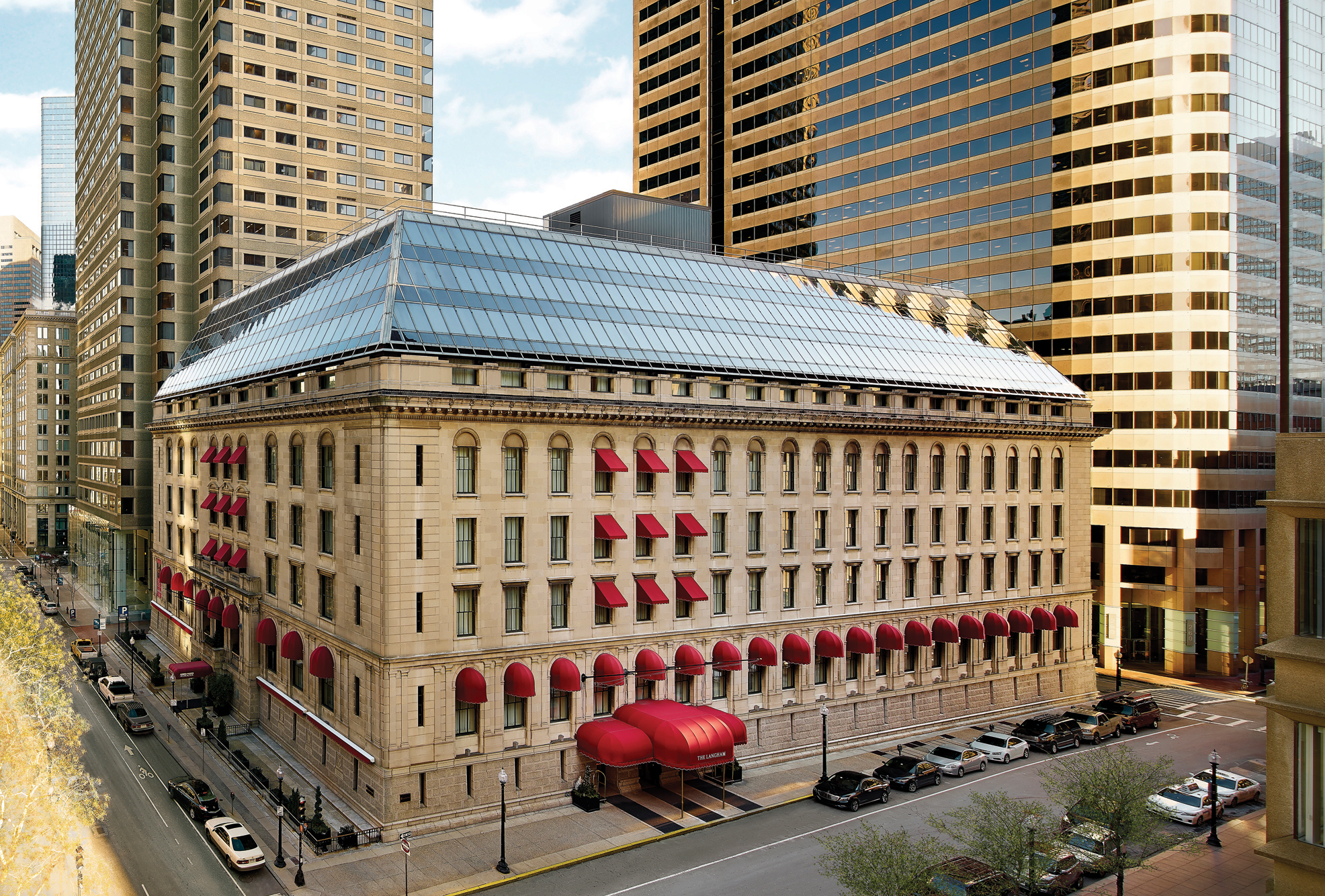
Federal Reserve Bank of Boston Building, Boston, Massachusetts, 1920-22.

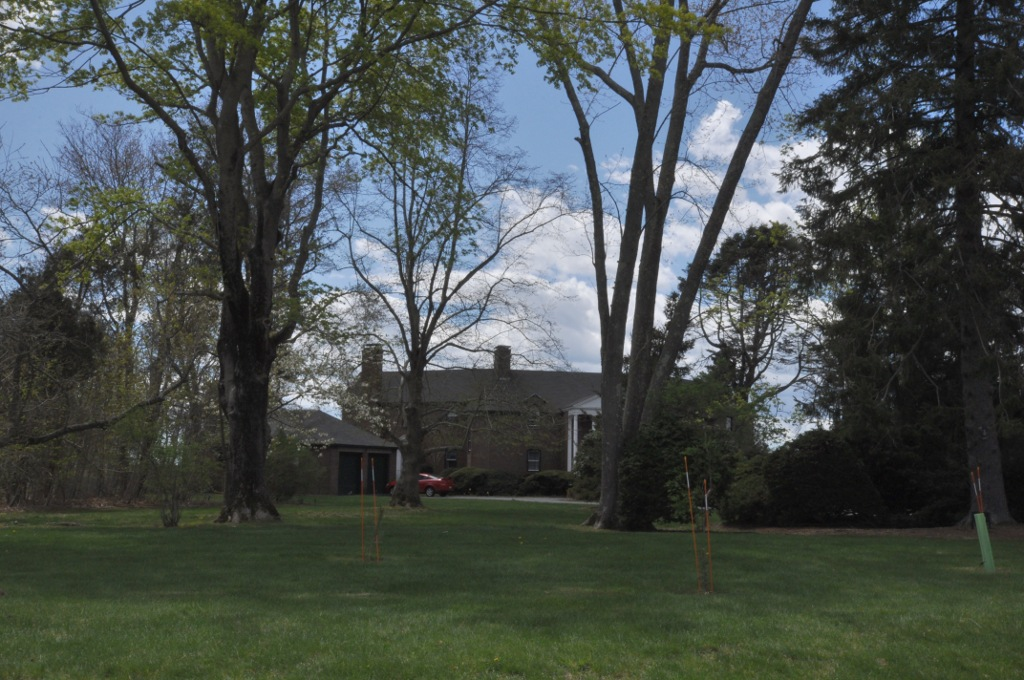

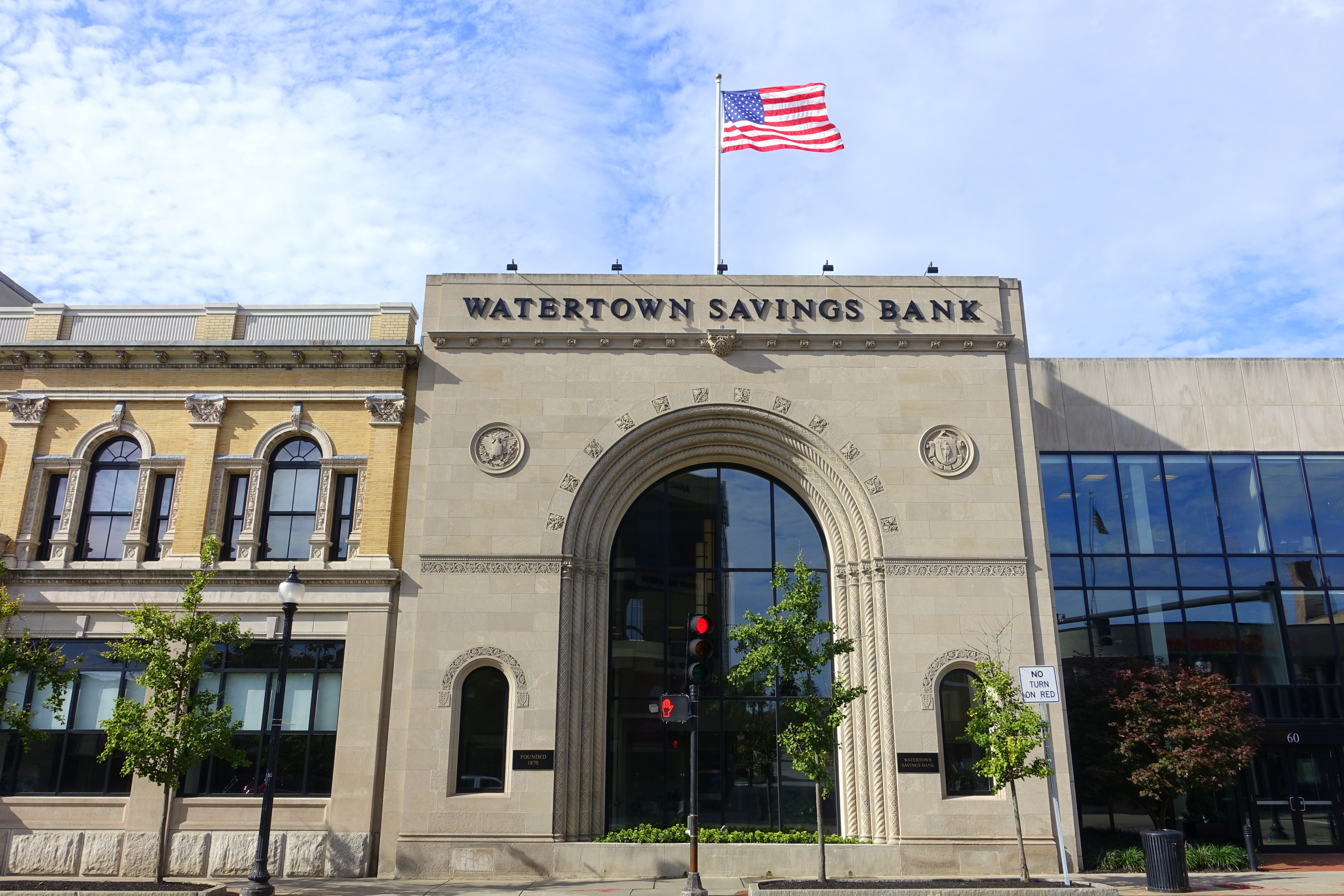
Watertown Savings Bank Building, Watertown, Massachusetts, 1921.

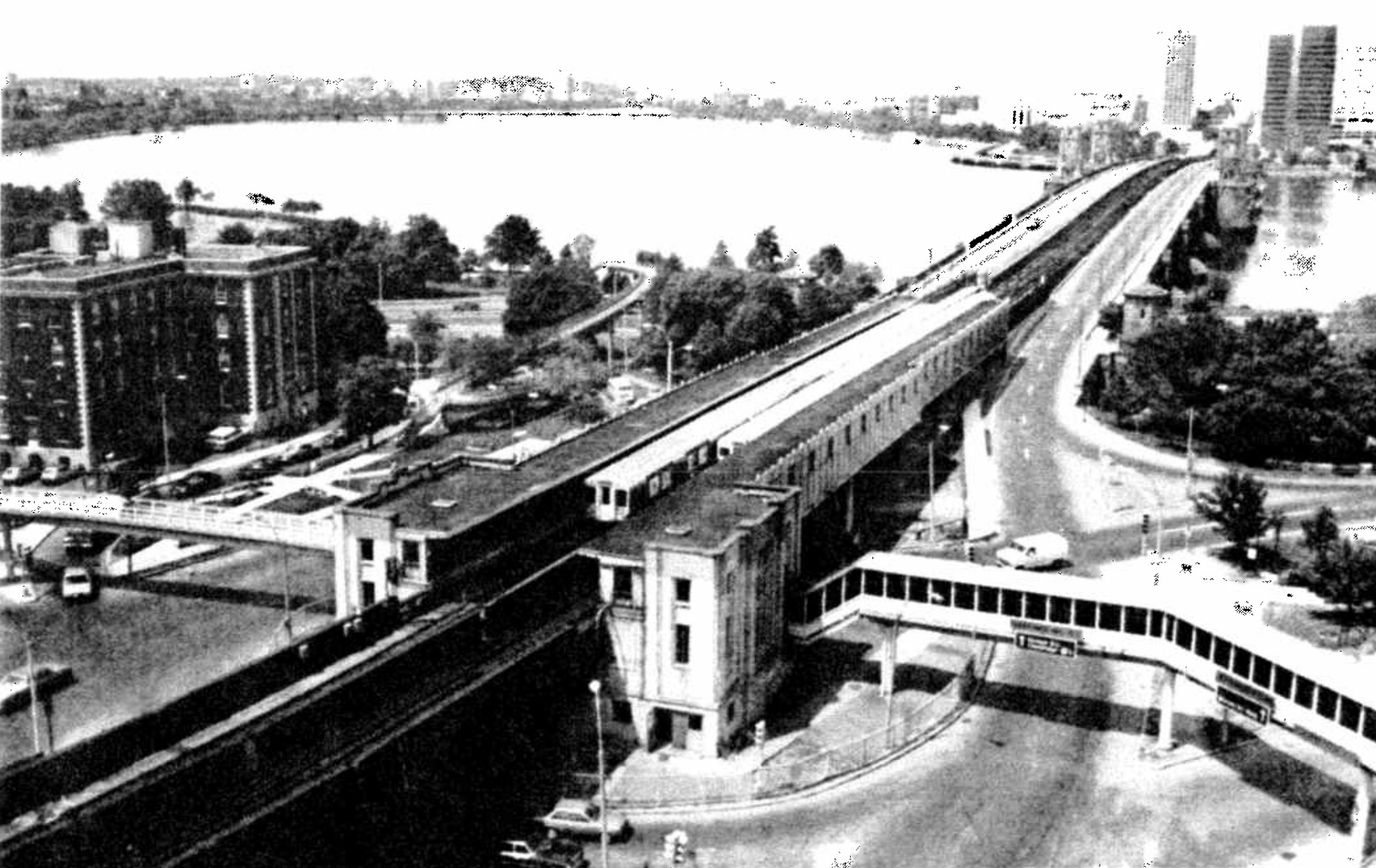
Charles/MGH station, Boston, Massachusetts, 1931-32.

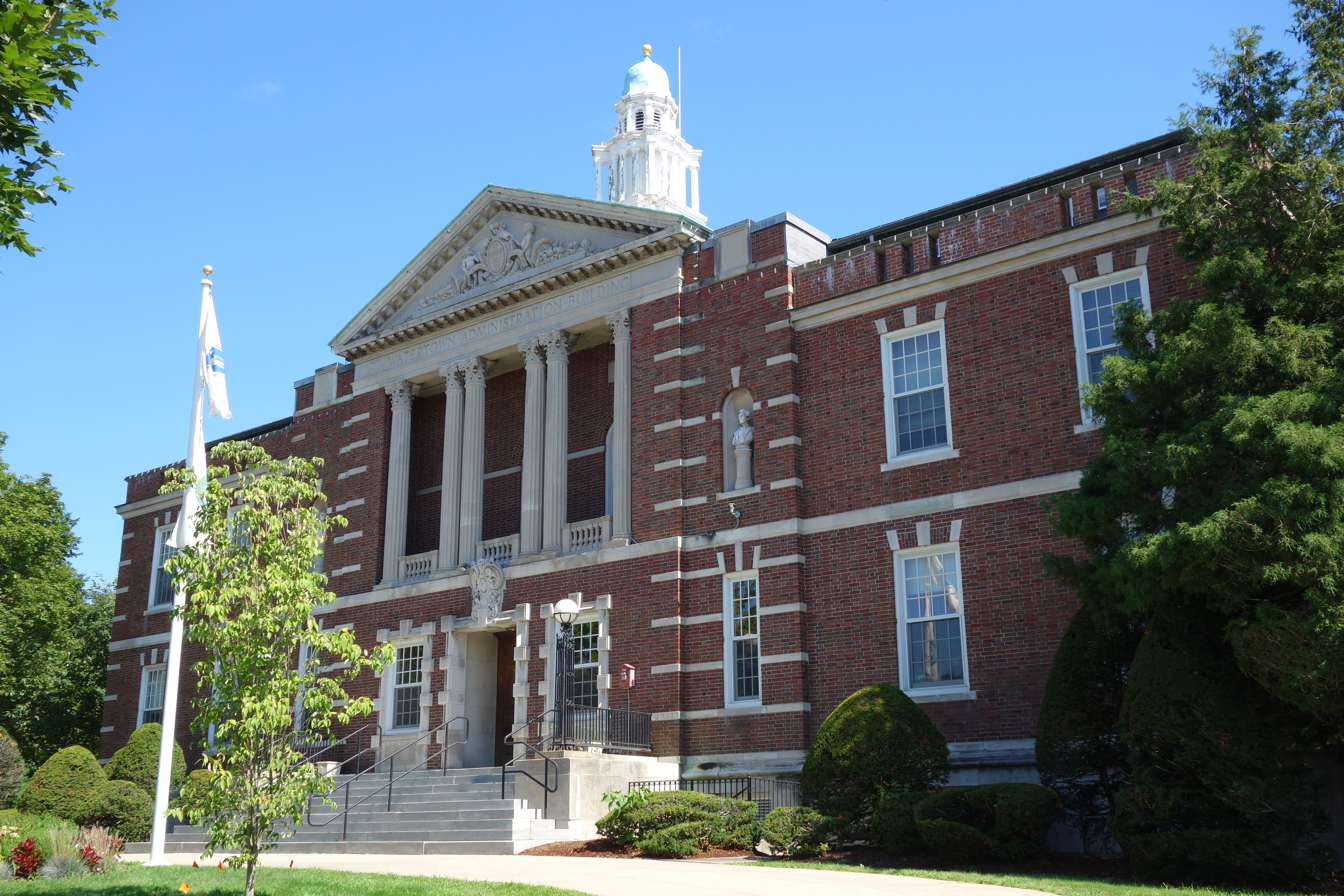
Watertown Administration Building, Watertown, Massachusetts, 1931-32.
