= Security Trust Building =

- U.S. National Register of Historic Places
- U.S. Historic district – Contributing property
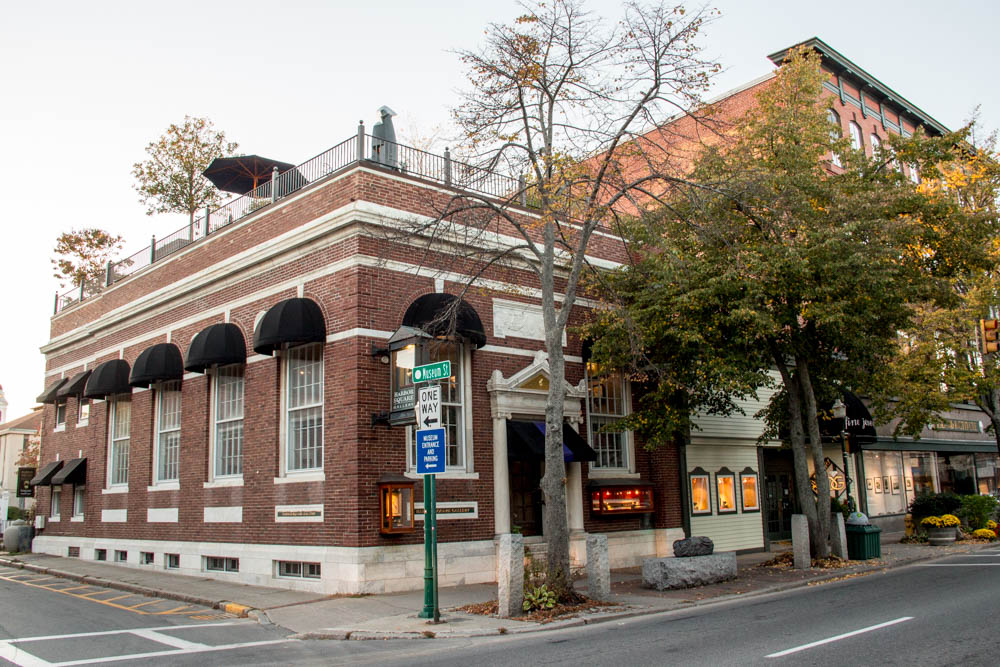

- Location within Maine Location within the United States
- Location: Museum and Main Sts., Rockland, Maine
- Coordinates: 44°6′13″N 69°6′35″W
- Area: 0.3 acres (0.12 ha)
- Built: 1912
- Architect: Richard Clipston Sturgis
- Part of: Main Street Historic District (ID78000182)
- NRHP reference No.: 78000185

Significant dates
- Added to NRHP: January 20, 1978
- Designated CP: June 7, 1978

The Security Trust Building is a historic commercial building at Museum and Main Streets in downtown Rockland, Maine, United States. Built in 1912, it is a high-quality local example of Colonial Revival architecture, designed by Boston architect R. Clipston Sturgis. It was listed on the National Register of Historic Places in 1978.

== Description and history ==
The former Security Trust Building is located in downtown Rockland, at the northwest corner of Main and Museum Streets, just north of the Farnsworth Art Museum. It is a rectangular single-story masonry structure, built out of brick with marble trim. It has a flat roof (now with a restaurant terrace on it, surrounded by a metal railing), and is set on a granite foundation faced in marble. The building corners have brick quoining, which rise to an entablature with bands of brick and marble, including a marble cornice. The main facade faces Main Street, and is three bays wide. The center bay has the building entrance, flanked by engaged Ionic columns, and topped by an entablature and gabled pediment. The flanking windows are set in rounded-arch openings above marble panes. Similar windows line the facade facing Museum Street. The interior includes a decorative frieze depicting the coinage of the period.

The building was constructed in 1911-12 to a design by Boston architect R. Clipston Sturgis. It is a high-quality example of an early 20th-century modestly scaled bank building with Colonial Revival styling.

== See also ==
- National Register of Historic Places listings in Knox County, Maine
