= Lakeview Village Historic District =

- U.S. National Register of Historic Places
- U.S. Historic district
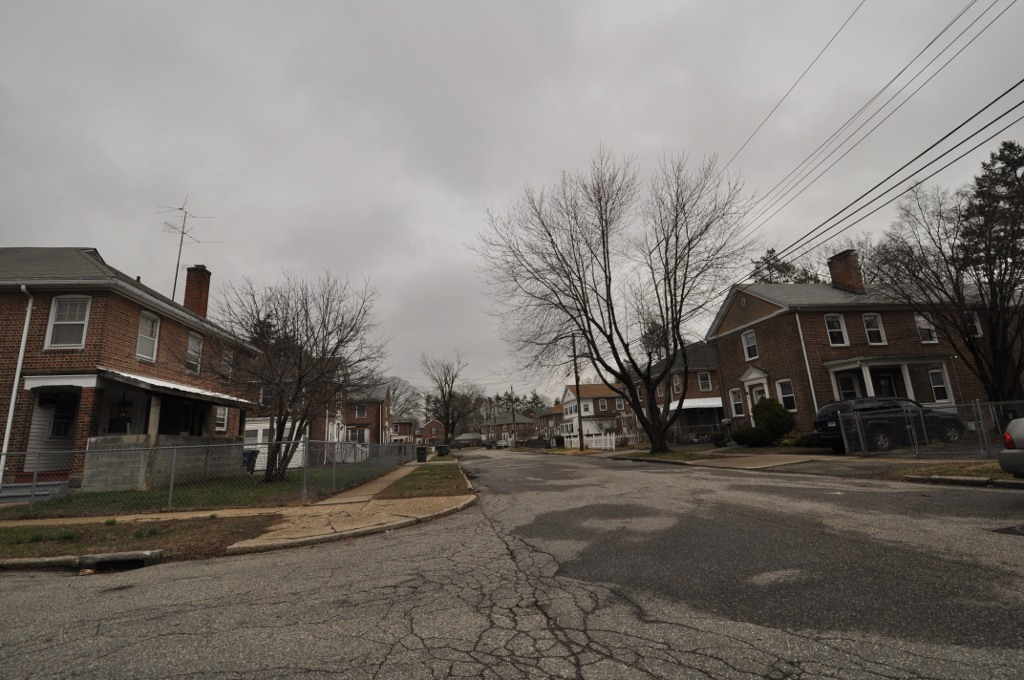

- Location within Connecticut Location within the United States
- Location: Roughly bounded by Essex Street, Boston Avenue, Colony Street, Plymouth Street and Asylum Street, Bridgeport, Connecticut
- Coordinates: 41°11′50″N 73°10′41″W
- Area: 21 acres (8.5 ha)
- Architect: Sturgis, R. Clipston; Shurtleff, Arthur
- Architectural style: Colonial Revival
- MPS: Wartime Emergency Housing in Bridgeport MPS
- NRHP reference No.: 90001428
- Added to NRHP: September 26, 1990

The Lakeview Village Historic District encompasses a historic World War I-era housing project on the east side of Bridgeport, Connecticut. Located northeast of Boston Avenue (U.S. Route 1) and west of Lakeview Cemetery, the development was built in 1918–20 to provide emergency housing for an influx of workers to the city's war production industries, and is a good early example of a Garden City movement subdivision. The district was listed on the National Register of Historic Places in 1990.

== Description and history ==
Lakeview Village is located on Bridgeport's East Side, occupying 21 acres (8.5 ha) on a collection of streets between Boston Avenue and Lakeview Cemetery. The development includes 93 residences, including detached single-family and duplex residences, as well as a series of rowhouses. All are built of red brick, and share a common architecture vocabulary of Colonial Revival styling, with recurring similarities in choice of roof shape, door and window orientation and placement, and the type of sheltering of the main entrance.

Lakeview Village was designed by an architectural collaboration which included R. Clipston Sturgis, Arthur Shurtleff, and Andrew Hepburn. Originally called the Mill Green Housing Project, it was built by the United States Housing Corporation in 1918–20, to provide housing for workers in the nearby war-related industries. One of the objectives of these housing projects was to provide high-quality housing in an attractive yet urban setting to attract and retain the needed workers. The master plan, whose elements are still evident in the landscape, follow the precepts of the Garden City movement.

== See also ==
- National Register of Historic Places listings in Bridgeport, Connecticut
