= Langham Hotel Boston =

The Langham, Boston

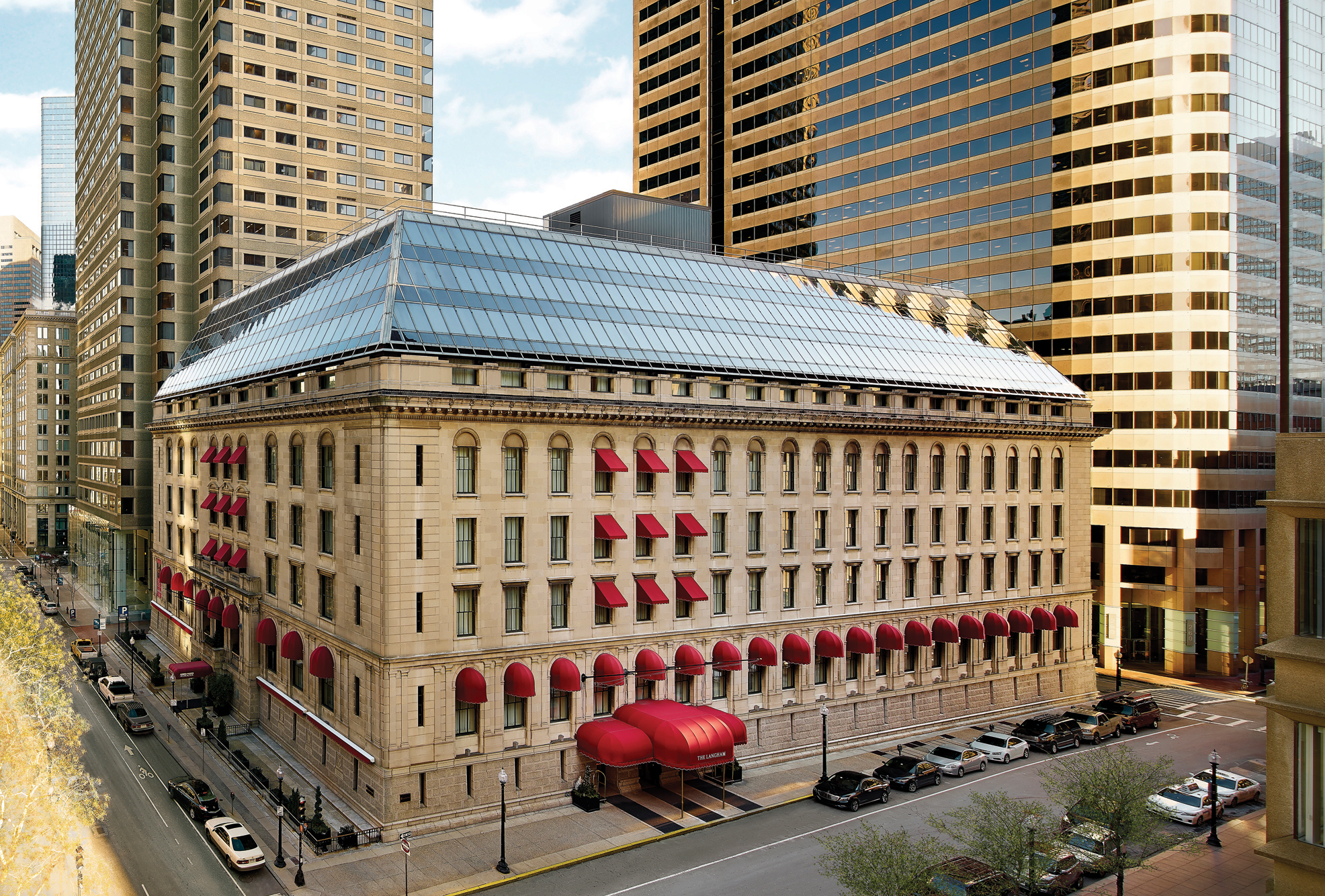
- The Langham, Boston (2015)
- Former names: Federal Reserve Bank of Boston; Hotel Meridien Boston; Le Méridien Boston
- Alternative names: The Langham, Boston

General information
- Architectural style: Renaissance Revival
- Location: Financial District, 250 Franklin Street, Boston, Massachusetts, United States
- Coordinates: 42.3565°N 71.0546°W
- Years built: 1922 (original); 1953 (expansion)
- Renovated: 2019–2021
- Owner: Langham Hospitality Group

Technical details
- Material: Granite

Design and construction
- Architect: R. Clipston Sturgis
- Developer: The Beacon Companies
- Designations: Boston Landmark (1978)

Website
- Official website

Boston Landmark
- Designated: October 10, 1978 (Federal Reserve Bank)

The Langham, Boston is a luxury hotel in a historic building located at 250 Franklin Street in the financial district of Boston, Massachusetts. It is a member of The Leading Hotels of the World and managed by Langham Hotels International.

== History ==
The Renaissance Revival building was constructed in 1922 as the Federal Reserve Bank of Boston. It was designed by R. Clipston Sturgis, based on the Palazzo della Cancelleria, in Rome, with its granite exterior, life-size equestrian statues, and painted dome ceiling. It was expanded in 1953 and designated a Boston Landmark in 1978.

The structure was converted to a hotel by developer Norman B. Leventhal's The Beacon Companies. It opened in 1981, managed by Le Meridien Hotels, as the Hotel Meridien Boston, with its name later changed slightly to Le Méridien Boston. The hotel was sold by Beacon and Stamford-based General Electric Investments Corp. to Hong Kong-based Pacific Eagle Holdings in 1997 for $100 million.

On December 31, 2003, the new owners switched management to their own Langham Hotels chain, and the hotel became The Langham, Boston.

In 2019 the hotel closed to undergo a complete renovation and re-opened its doors on June 30, 2021. The multimillion-dollar renovation included all guestrooms, meeting space, two new restaurants, The Langham Club lounge, fitness center and indoor pool and all public areas.

== Features ==
The Langham has 312 residentially styled guest rooms and suites, with Italian marble bathrooms, and two dining destinations: The Fed, a British-inspired cocktail pub with a New England twist, and GRANA, an Italian destination restaurant serving breakfast, lunch and weekend brunch. The hotel is home to a club lounge on the eighth floor overlooking Norman B. Leventhal Park and redesigned meeting space, including two ballrooms.

Formerly the Governor's Reception room, The Wyeth Room contains two historic N. C. Wyeth murals. The Member's Court room contains Norman B. Leventhal's collection of historic Massachusetts maps. As the hotel was previously a bank, the ground floor has narrow windows to help discourage unwanted intruders. The original entry doors from Pearl Street still contain the gold coin moldings, and the bank vault is now used as a pastry kitchen.
