= Boston Common Tablet =

Sculpture in Boston, Massachusetts, U.S.

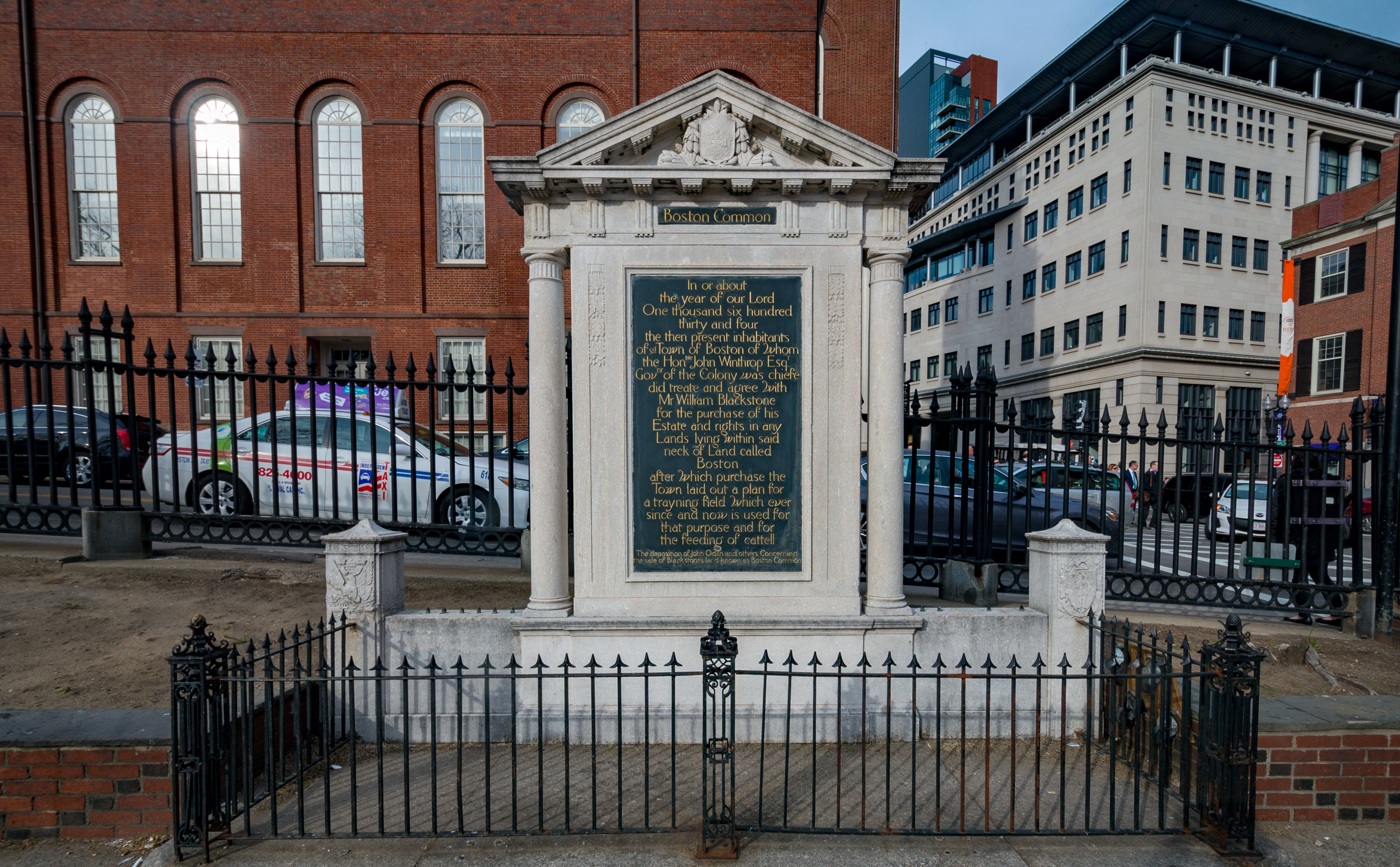
- The tablet in 2016
- Location: Boston, Massachusetts, U.S.; 42.356626°N 71.062231°W

Boston Common Tablet is a 1913 sculpture by R. Clipston Sturgis, installed at Boston Common in Boston, Massachusetts, United States.

== Description and history ==
The slate and granite tablet is installed near the intersection of Park and Tremont streets, and measures approximately 15 x 5 x 20 ft. An inscription reads:

In or about / the year of our Lord / One thousand six hundred / thirty and four / the then present inhabitants / of Town of Boston of whom / the Honble(sic) John Winthrop Esqr. / Govnr. of the Colony was chiefe(sic) / did treate(sic) and agree with / Mr. William Blackstone / for the purchase of his / Estate and rights in any / Lands lying within said / neck of Land called / Boston / after which purchase the / Town laid out a plan for / a trayning(sic) field which ever / since and now is used for / that purpose and for / feeding of cattell(sic) / The deposition of John Odlin and others Concerning / the sale of Blackstone's land known as Boston Common.

The artwork was surveyed as part of the Smithsonian Institution's "Save Outdoor Sculpture!" program in 1997.

== See also ==
- 1913 in art
