= Warren Harding High School =

Location
- 379 Bond Street; Bridgeport, Connecticut 06610; United States; 41°11′54″N 73°10′12″W

Information
- Type: Public
- Established: 1925 (101 years ago)
- CEEB code: 070070
- Principal: Vernon Thompson
- Staff: 68.25 (FTE)
- Grades: 9–12
- Enrollment: 1,201 (2023-2024)
- Student to teacher ratio: 17.60
- Colors: Blue and gold
- Mascot: Eagle
- Website: www.bridgeportedu.net/harding

Warren Harding High School is a public high school in Bridgeport, Connecticut, United States. It is commonly called Harding High School. Its cornerstone was laid on May 10, 1924, and the school opened on September 9, 1925. The school is named for then recently deceased President Warren G. Harding.

== Athletics ==
The Presidents sports seasons are in the traditional fall/winter/spring format. Sports include football, soccer, volleyball, basketball, wrestling, baseball, golf, track, and softball.

== Buildings ==
Original facility

The original school was designed by C. Wellington Walker, and was located at 1734 Central Avenue. Featuring Georgian style architecture and Greek columns, it was in service for 93 years.

Current facility

Built at a cost of $107 million the new building was completed in 2018 and is a four-story 207,000 square feet (19,200 m^{2}) square foot structure. It was built on a former General Electric factory site which underwent considerable environmental remediation. The building has many security features, including bulletproof glass and 130 security cameras.

== Notable alumni ==
- John Edward Bagley (1979), professional basketball player
- Tony Elliott, professional football player
- Mike Jones (1985), professional football player
- Walt Kelly (1930), cartoonist, creator of Pogo
- Fay Honey Knopp (1935), Quaker minister, peace and civil rights advocate, and prison abolitionist
- Wes Matthews (attended Harding 1974–77), professional basketball player
- Wayne Moore (1949), Olympic gold medalist from the 1952 Summer Olympics
- Nejdra Nance, child abductee who received national attention for solving her own kidnapping 23 years later
- Charles Smith (1984), professional basketball player
- Samuel J. Tedesco, Mayor of Bridgeport (1957-1965), Lieutenant Governor of Connecticut (1963-1965), Judge of the Superior Court (1967-1980)
