= Harold H. Anthony House =

Historic house in Massachusetts, United States

- Formerly listed on the U.S. National Register of Historic Places
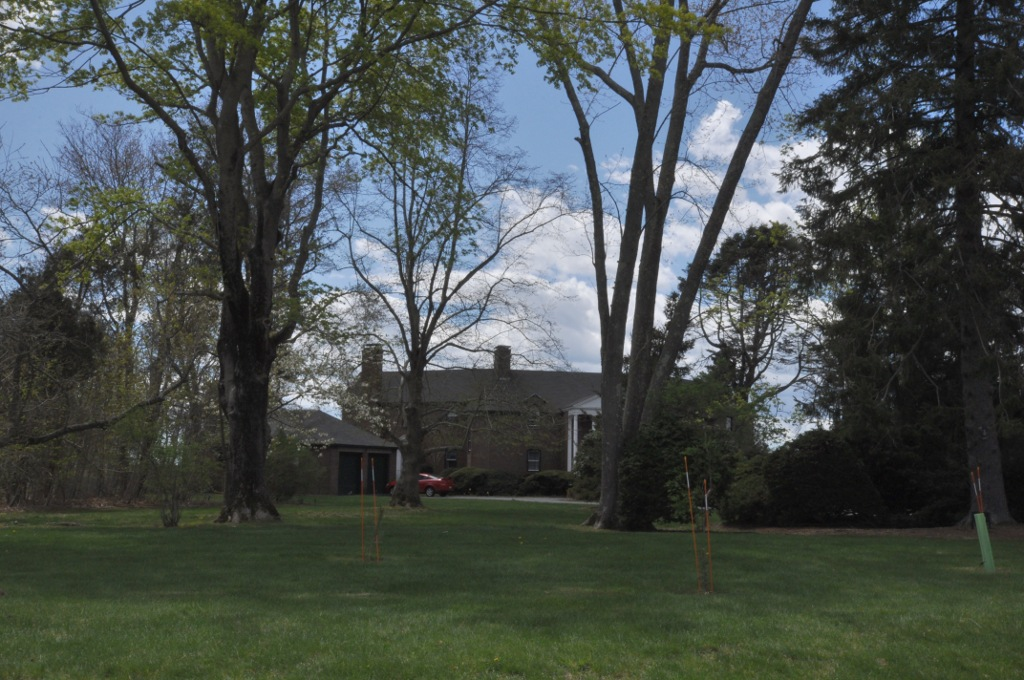

- Location within Massachusetts Location within the United States
- Location: 132 Bay Point Road, Swansea, Massachusetts
- Coordinates: 41°42′39″N 71°12′43″W
- Area: 1.57 acres (0.64 ha)
- Built: 1922
- Architect: Richard Clipston Sturgis
- Architectural style: Colonial Revival
- MPS: Swansea MRA
- NRHP reference No.: 90000058

Significant dates
- Added to NRHP: February 12, 1990
- Removed from NRHP: October 26, 2026

The Harold H. Anthony House is a historic house located on Gardner's Neck in Swansea, Massachusetts. Built in 1922 to a design by R. Clipston Sturgis, it is a high quality local example of Georgian Revival architecture, unusual in the town for its use of brick. It was listed on the National Register of Historic Places on February 12, 1990. It was removed from the register on October 26, 2026, because of structural alterations changing the historical integrity of the house.

== Description and history ==
Gardner's Neck is a peninsula projecting southward into Mount Hope Bay between the Cole and Lee Rivers on Swansea's south coast. The house stands at the southern end of the peninsula, just west of the David M. Anthony House. It is a 2 1/2-story brick building, with a gabled roof. It has a rectangular main section, with wings extending toward the water on each side. The main entrance is set under a Classical portico with triangular pediment, supported by grouped Doric columns.

This elegant two-story brick Georgian Revival house was designed by R. Clipston Sturgis and built in 1922 for Harold Anthony, son of David M. Anthony, on land subdivided from a larger property purchased by the elder Anthony in 1883. It is rare in Swansea both as a brick house, and as one designed by a major architect. Unlike his father's house, which was intended as a summer property, Harold's was designed for year-round occupation, and started a trend of winterization of summer houses on Gardner's Neck.

Between 2021 and the present, this historic house has been gutted and the exterior significantly changed. It no longer resembles the house in the photo. Accordingly, it was removed from the Registry on October 26, 2026.

== See also ==
- National Register of Historic Places listings in Bristol County, Massachusetts
