= David M. Anthony House (Fall River, Massachusetts) =

Historic house in Massachusetts, United States

- U.S. National Register of Historic Places
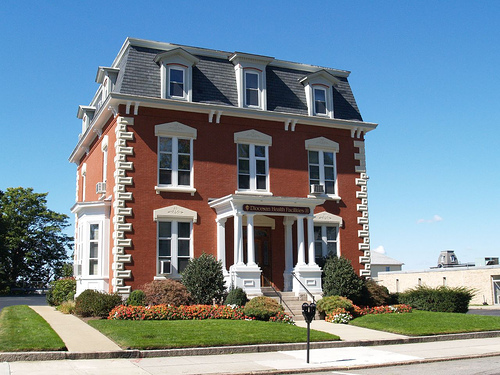

- Location within Massachusetts Location within the United States
- Interactive map showing the location for David M. Anthony House
- Location: 368 N. Main St., Fall River, Massachusetts
- Coordinates: 41°42′25″N 71°9′18″W
- Built: 1875
- Architectural style: Late Victorian, Second Empire
- MPS: Fall River MRA
- NRHP reference No.: 83000620
- Added to NRHP: February 16, 1983

The David M. Anthony House is a historic house located at 368 North Main Street in Fall River, Massachusetts. Built in 1875 for a local businessman, it is one of the city's finest examples of Second Empire style. It was added to the National Register of Historic Places in 1983.

== Description and history ==
The David M. Anthony House stands north of downtown Fall River, on the west side of North Main Street between Walnut and Locust Streets. It is a 2 1/2-story brick structure, three bays wide, with a mansard roof, stone corner quoining, and a bracketed cornice. Paired windows are set in rectangular openings, with peaked gable lintels and bracketed sills. The main entrance is sheltered by a porch with clustered columns mounted on square paneled blocks. A polygonal window bay projects from the left side of the house.

The house was built in 1875, and is one of the city's finest examples of Second Empire architecture. It was built for David Anthony, a partner in a supply firm, and may have been built by his wife's uncle, who owned a local construction firm. The use of brick in residential construction is unusual for the period in Fall River, indicating a house of some importance. The house originally also featured a cupola and iron cresting on the roof, but these details have been lost, as has a similarly styled carriage house. Between 1916 and 1940 it was occupied by the Knights of Columbus. It was later sold to the Roman Catholic Diocese of Fall River.

== See also ==
- David M. Anthony House (Swansea, Massachusetts)
- National Register of Historic Places listings in Fall River, Massachusetts
- List of historic houses in Massachusetts
