= David M. Anthony House (Swansea, Massachusetts) =

Historic house in Massachusetts, United States

- U.S. National Register of Historic Places
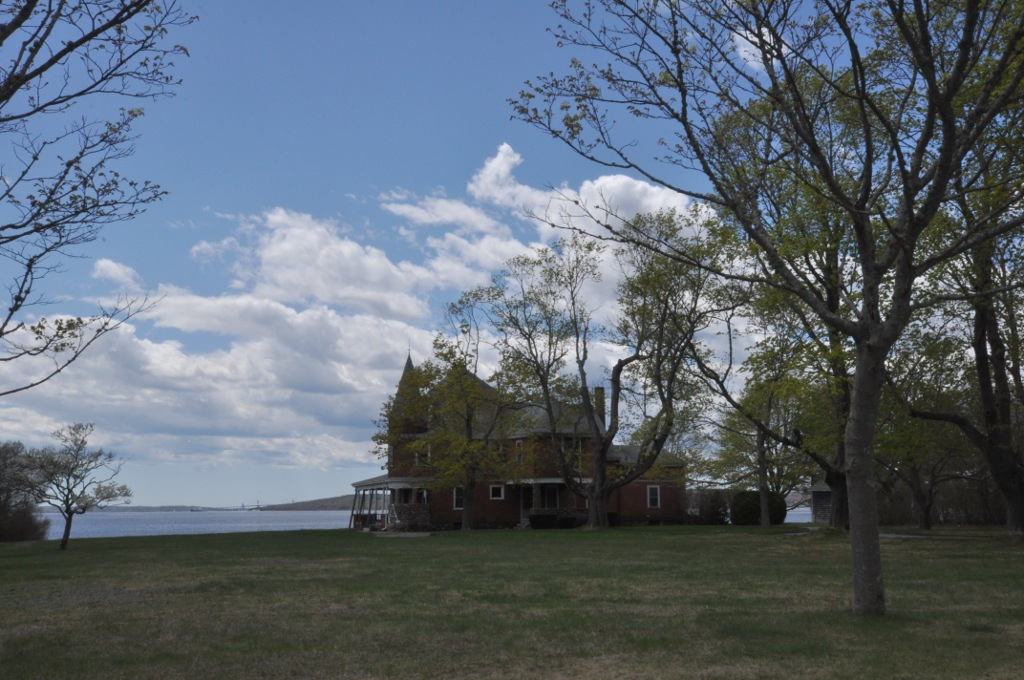

- Location within Massachusetts Location within the United States
- Location: 98 Bay Point Road, Swansea, Massachusetts
- Coordinates: 41°42′37″N 71°12′37″W
- Area: 8.57 acres (3.47 ha)
- Built: 1895
- Architect: Beattie, William
- Architectural style: Queen Anne
- MPS: Swansea MRA
- NRHP reference No.: 90000059
- Added to NRHP: February 16, 1990

The David M. Anthony House is a historic house at 98 Bay Point Avenue on Gardner's Neck in Swansea, Massachusetts. Built in 1895 for a prominent Fall River businessman, it was one of the first summer houses in the area, and is a high quality example of Queen Anne Victorian architecture. It was listed on the National Register of Historic Places in 1990.

== Description and history ==
Gardner's Neck is a peninsula projecting southward into Mount Hope Bay between the Cole and Lee Rivers on Swansea's south coast. The David M. Anthony House is located on a large parcel at the center of the peninsula's southern shore, which includes its very southernmost tip. The house is a 2 1/2-story wood-frame structure, with asymmetrical massing typical of the Queen Anne period. It has a hip roof with cross gables, and porch that wraps around the waterfront side to the east. The exterior is finished in a combination of wooden shingles and clapboards.

The house was built in 1895, and was one of the first summer houses built on Gardner's Neck. It was built as the summer estate of David M. Anthony, a Fall River businessman who founded the Swift River Meat Packing Company. He and other Fall River businessmen were responsible for the transition of Gardner's Neck from a mainly agricultural area to a summer resort area. This house remained in the Anthony family until 1942.

The original house was replaced in the late 2010s and all that visibly remains of the original structure is the round stone portion of the porch and the garage.

== See also ==
- Harold H. Anthony House, built next door for Anthony's son
- David M. Anthony House (Fall River, Massachusetts), Anthony's house in Fall River
- National Register of Historic Places listings in Bristol County, Massachusetts
