= C. Wellington Walker =

American architect (1889–1967)

- Born: 1889; Strang, Nebraska
- Died: 1967 (aged 77–78); Bridgeport, Connecticut
- Occupation: Architect
- Buildings: Warren Harding High School, U. S. Post Office, University of Bridgeport buildings, Bridgeport Hospital

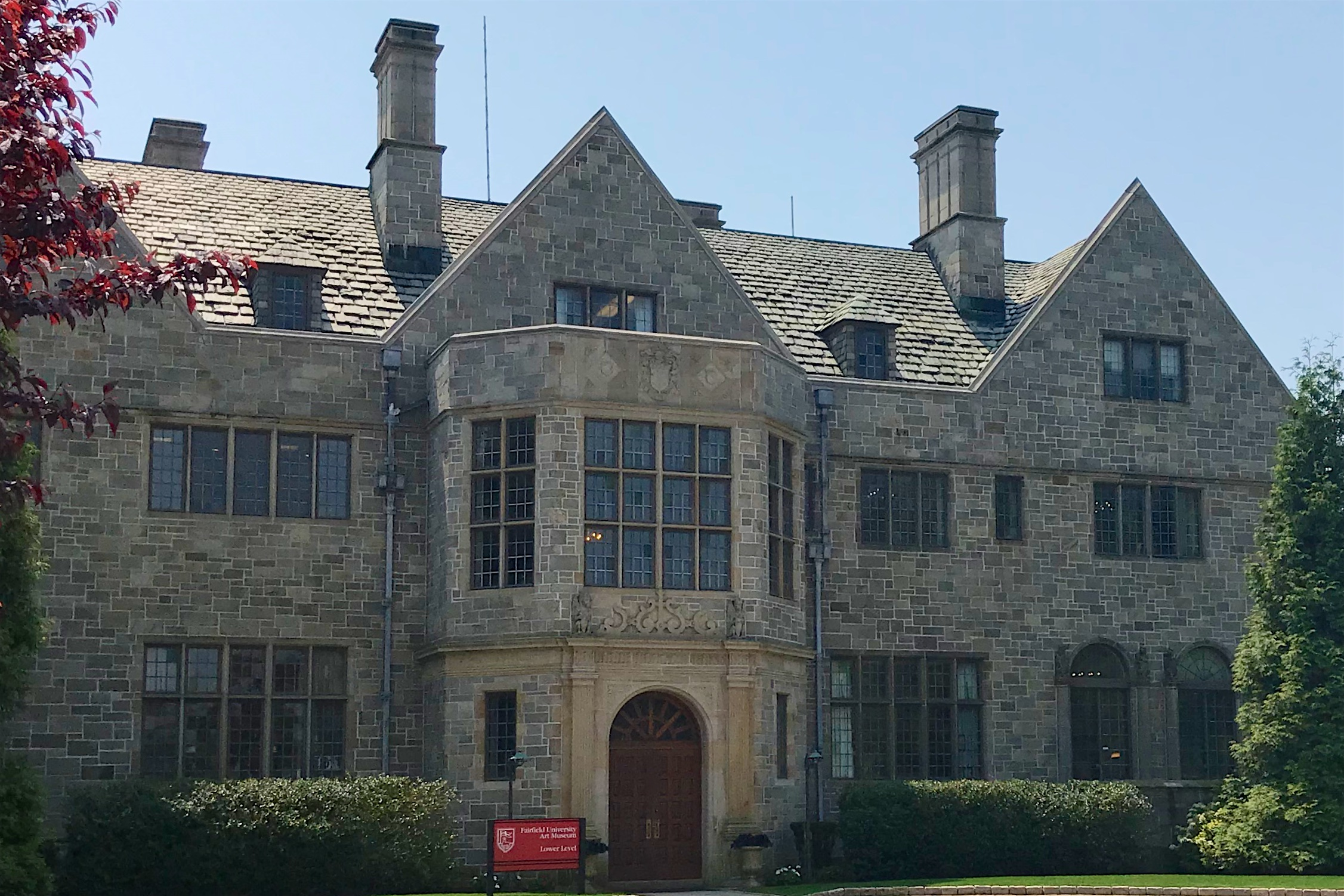
Hearthstone Hall, now Bellarmine Hall of Fairfield University, designed before World War I by Skinner & Walker and completed by Skinner in 1921.

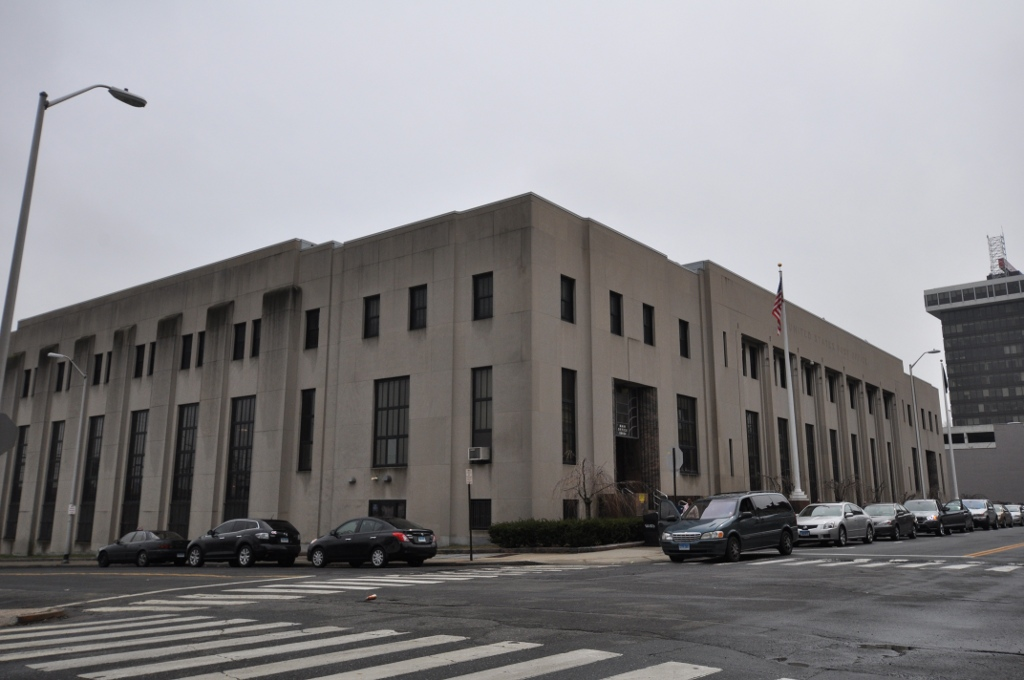
The United States Post Office in Bridgeport, designed by Walker and completed in 1934.

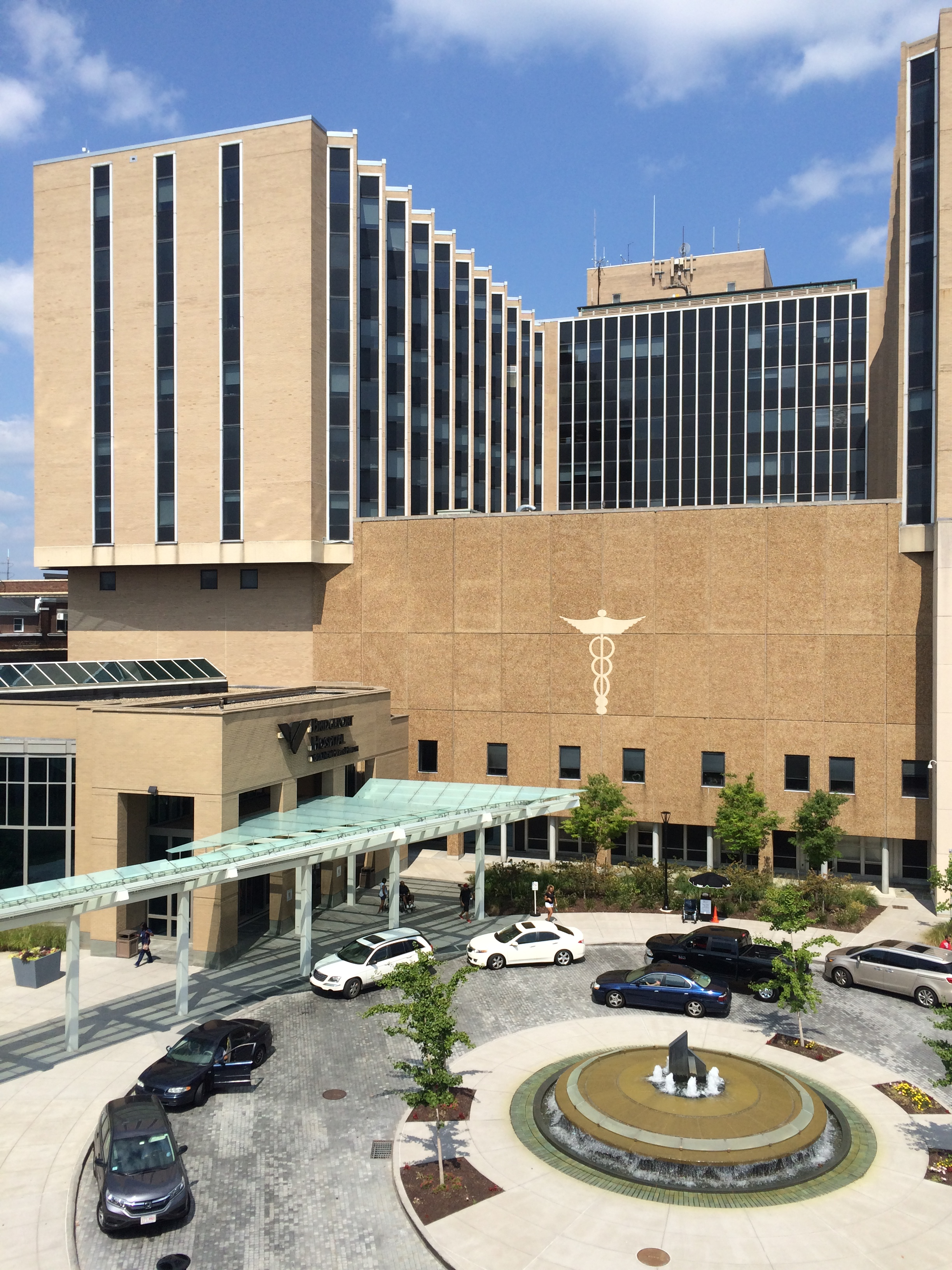
Bridgeport Hospital, designed by Walker and his associate, Arsenault, and built in two phases, completed in 1959 and 1968.

C. Wellington Walker FAIA (1889–1967) was an American architect in practice in Bridgeport, Connecticut from 1910 until 1967.

== Life and career ==
Charles Wellington Walker Jr. was born in 1889 in Strang, Nebraska to Charles Wellington Walker, a typewriter designer, and his wife. In 1894 the family relocated to Bridgeport. Walker's architectural training began in 1908, when he worked for Bridgeport architect Ernest G. Southey. That same year he began studying at the University of Pennsylvania, then under the leadership of architect Paul Philippe Cret. After his graduation in 1910 he briefly worked for Leoni W. Robinson in New Haven before forming the Bridgeport firm of Skinner & Walker with Walter J. Skinner the same year. Skinner and Walker's partnership lasted only until 1919, when both opened independent offices. Walker remained in private practice until his death in 1967. As an independent architect, Walker built extensively for the University of Bridgeport and other local institutions. His firm lasted for a few more years as C. Wellington Walker Associates, led by Flavian F. Arsenault.

Walker joined the American Institute of Architects in 1921, and in 1953 was elected a Fellow, the organization's highest membership honor.

== Architectural works ==
=== Skinner & Walker, 1910–1919 ===
- Alfred C. Fones/Roy E. Tuthill Office Building, 10 Washington Ave., Bridgeport, Connecticut (1912) - The dental office of both men. Demolished.
- F. Winthrop Pyle House, 170 Washington Ter., Bridgeport, Connecticut (1913)
- Harry L. Sterrett House, 32 Lookout Dr. S., Fairfield, Connecticut (1913)
- Tracy B. Warren House, 2354 North Ave., Bridgeport, Connecticut (1913) - Demolished.
- American Chain Co., 955 Connecticut Ave., Bridgeport, Connecticut (1914)
- Charles D. Davis Apartments, 1519 Main St., Bridgeport, Connecticut (1917) - Demolished.
- Hearthstone Hall, N. Benson Rd., Fairfield, Connecticut (1919–21) - The residence of Walter B. Lashar. Built under Skinner alone. Now Fairfield University's Bellarmine Hall.
- American Legion Annex, 307 Golden Hill St., Bridgeport, Connecticut (1919–20) - A large addition to an 1850s Italianate house.

=== C. Wellington Walker, 1919–1967 ===
- Warren Harding High School, 1734 Central Ave., Bridgeport, Connecticut (1924–25)
- Masonic Temple, 3960 Main St., Stratford, Connecticut (1927)
- Y. M. C. A. Building, 651 State St., Bridgeport, Connecticut (1927)
- The Chimneys, 124 Old Battery Rd., Bridgeport, Connecticut (1929) - Built for Dudley M. Morris. Bridgeport's largest private residence.
- U. S. Post Office, 120 Middle St., Bridgeport, Connecticut (1934)
- Stratford Town Hall, 2725 Main St., Stratford, Connecticut (1935)
- Stratford Fire Station, 2712 Main St., Stratford, Connecticut (1940)
- Y. W. C. A. Building, 263 Golden Hill St., Bridgeport, Connecticut (1941)
- Stratford High School Gymnasium, 45 N. Parade St., Stratford, Connecticut (1947)
- City Trust Co. Branch, 1071 E. Main St., Bridgeport, Connecticut (1949)
- Engineering-Technology Building, University of Bridgeport, Bridgeport, Connecticut (1950)
- Carlson Library, University of Bridgeport, Bridgeport, Connecticut (1954–55)
- Harvey Hubbell Gymnasium, University of Bridgeport, Bridgeport, Connecticut (1956)
- Chaffee Hall, University of Bridgeport, Bridgeport, Connecticut (1957)
- Cooper Hall, University of Bridgeport, Bridgeport, Connecticut (1957)
- Bridgeport Hospital, 267 Grant St., Bridgeport, Connecticut (1959) - The plainer rear International Style wings.
- John J. Cox Student Center, University of Bridgeport, Bridgeport, Connecticut (1960–61)
- Marina Hall, University of Bridgeport, Bridgeport, Connecticut (1961)
- Barnum Hall, University of Bridgeport, Bridgeport, Connecticut (1962)
- Eleanor Naylor Dana Hall, University of Bridgeport, Bridgeport, Connecticut (1962)
- Seeley Hall, University of Bridgeport, Bridgeport, Connecticut (1962)
- Warner Hall, University of Bridgeport, Bridgeport, Connecticut (1962)
- Bruell & Rennell Halls, University of Bridgeport, Bridgeport, Connecticut (1965) - Later sold to the City.
- Alfred V. Bodine Hall, University of Bridgeport, Bridgeport, Connecticut (1967)

=== C. Wellington Walker Associates, after 1967 ===
- Front wings, Bridgeport Hospital, 267 Grant St., Bridgeport, Connecticut (1968)
- Isaac E. Schine Hall, University of Bridgeport, Bridgeport, Connecticut (1969–70)
