= Albert Hoffman =

Albert Hoffman may refer to:

- Albert Hoffman (artist) (1915–1993), American artist
- Albert Hoffmann (Nazi) (1907–1972), German politician and Nazi Gauleiter
- Albert Hoffmann (horticulturist) (1846–1924), German rosarian

== See also ==
- Albert Hofman (disambiguation)
- Albert Hofmann (1906–2008), Swiss scientist and discoverer of LSD-25
- Al Hoffman (1902–1960), songwriter
- Al Hofmann (1947–2008), drag car owner
- Abbie Hoffman (1936–1989), American activist
- Abby Hoffman (born 1947), Canadian track and field athlete
