= The Old Plantation =

American folk art watercolor painting

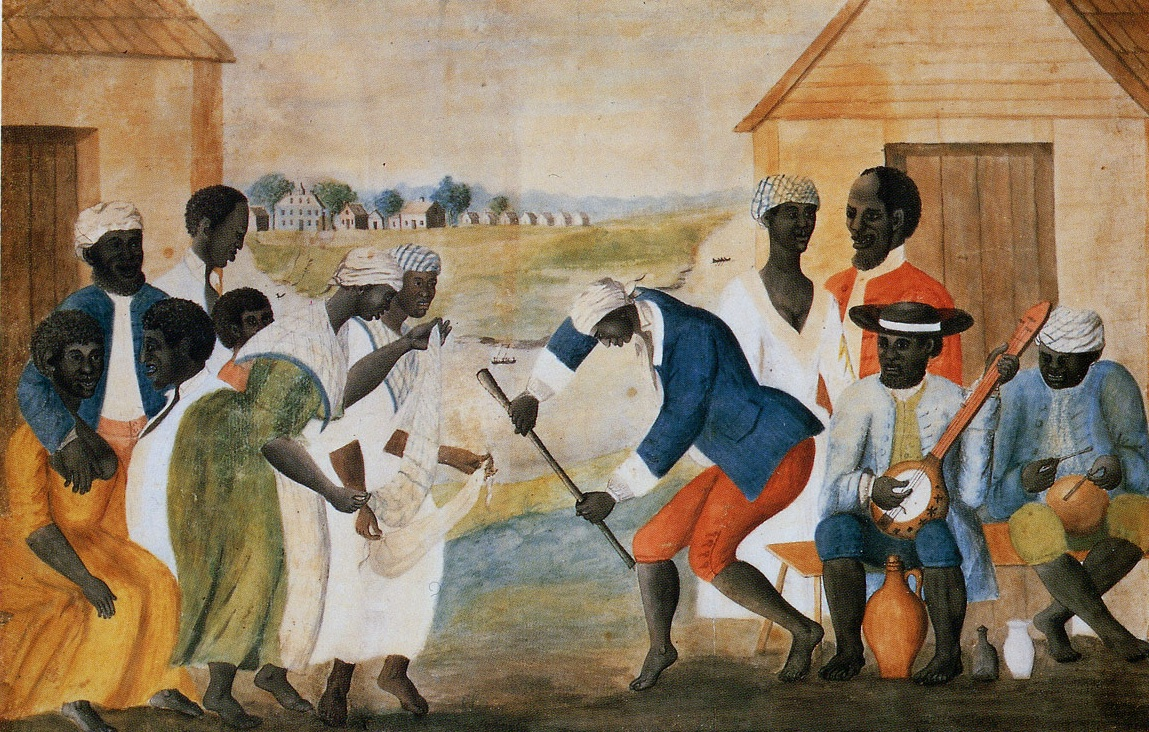
- Artist: Attributed to John Rose
- Year: possibly 1785–1795
- Type: Watercolor on laid paper
- Dimensions: 29.7 cm × 45.4 cm (11 11/16 in × 17 7/8 in)
- Location: Abby Aldrich Rockefeller Folk Art Museum, Williamsburg, Virginia

The Old Plantation is an American folk art watercolor probably painted in the late 18th century on a South Carolina plantation. It is notable for its early date, its credible, non-stereotypical depiction of enslaved people on the North American mainland, and the fact that the enslaved are shown pursuing their own interests. In 2010, Colonial Williamsburg librarian Susan P. Shames identified the artist as South Carolina slaveholder John Rose, and the painting may depict his plantation in what is now Beaufort County.

== Description and interpretation ==
The painting depicts African American enslaved laborers between two small outbuildings of a plantation located on a broad river. It is the only known painting of its era that depicts African Americans by themselves, concerned only with each other, though its central activity remains obscure. Some writers have speculated that the painting depicts a marriage ceremony, with the attendant tradition of "jumping the broom". However, scholars have suggested that the subjects are performing a secular dance: western African dance patterns traditionally include sticks and a variety of body positions. The headdresses pictured are of West African origin.

The painting shows two male musicians, one of whom is playing an early gourd banjo. This is the earliest known painting to picture a banjo. The second musician is playing a percussion instrument that resembles a Yoruba gudugudu. The two women hold what look like scarves, but are actually sheguras, rattles made of a gourd enclosed in a net of variable length into which hard objects have been woven.

== Artist and provenance ==
For decades the identity of the artist was unknown, as was the painting's provenance before 1935, when it was purchased by Holger Cahill from Mary E. Lyles of Columbia, South Carolina. However, in 2010, Susan P. Shames, a librarian at Colonial Williamsburg, published a book titled The Old Plantation: The Artist Revealed in which she argues that the artist was the South Carolina plantation owner John Rose. Shames further suggests that the image depicts laborers on Rose's plantation in what is now Beaufort County, South Carolina, or one nearby.

In 1775, Rose was named Clerk of the Court of Common Pleas in Beaufort District, an appointment implying his educated status and familiarity with governing officials. By 1795, he owned a lot in the town of Beaufort, as well as a rural, 813-acre tract on the Coosaw River in Prince William Parish. He used enslaved labor to farm the latter property. At least 50 of these laborers have been identified by name, and he probably owned others. Shames suggests that the laborers and plantation depicted in the image were Rose's own. However, the broad river in the middle ground raises questions about whether Rose owned property on both sides of this natural boundary and, thus, whether he depicted his own dwelling and outbuildings in the background, or a neighbor's. Rose moved to the Dorchester area in present-day Colleton County in 1795, and he died in 1820 in Charleston after a fall from a horse.

In his will, Rose left the watercolor painting to his son-in-law, Thomas Davis Stall (1770–1848). According to Shames, it remained in the family for more than a hundred years, until it was finally sold at auction of the estate of Rose Rowan Ellis Copes (1846–1927) of Orangeburg, South Carolina, probably in 1928 or 1929. It was bought either by an unidentified interim dealer or by Mary Earle Lyles (b. 1878) of Columbia. It was certainly in Lyles' possession by 1935, when it was purchased by Holger Cahill, acting as agent for Abby Aldrich Rockefeller. According to Lyles, however, it was painted on a plantation between Charleston and Orangeburg. A watermark on the paper has been identified as that used by the English papermaker James Whatman II (1741–1798) between 1777 and 1794.

Rockefeller and Cahill transferred the painting to Williamsburg, Virginia, to be part of the Rockefeller collection at the Ludwell–Paradise House. It was later given to Colonial Williamsburg. The painting is currently held by the Abby Aldrich Rockefeller Folk Art Museum in Williamsburg.

== Works cited ==
- Colonial Williamsburg, "Old Plantation", EMuseum Online Catalog.
- Bontemps, Alex (2001), The Punished Self: Surviving Slavery in the Colonial South, Cornell University Press, ISBN 0-8014-3521-8.
- Epstein, Dena J. (Spring 1963), "Slave Music in the United States before 1860: A Survey of Sources (Part I)", Notes, 2nd series, vol. 20, no. 2, Music Library Association, pp. 195–212, doi:10.2307/894726, JSTOR 894726
- Epstein, Dena J. (September 1975), "The Folk Banjo: A Documentary History", Ethnomusicology, vol. 19, no. 3, Society for Ethnomusicology, pp. 347–371, doi:10.2307/850790, JSTOR 850790
- Foster, Helen Bradley (1997), New Raiments of Self: African American Clothing in the Antebellum South, Berg Publishers, ISBN 1-85973-189-9.
- Mazow, Leo G. (2005), Picturing the Banjo, Penn State Press, ISBN 0-271-02710-X.
- Shames, Susan P. (2010), The Old Plantation: The Artist Revealed, Colonial Williamsburg, ISBN 978-0-87935-243-1.
- Stillinger, Elizabeth (2002), "From Attics, Sheds, and Secondhand Shops: Collecting Folk Art in America, 1880–1940", in Clayton, Virginia Tuttle (ed.), Drawing on America's Past: Folk Art, Modernism, and the Index of American Design, University of North Carolina Press, pp. 45–60, ISBN 0-89468-295-4
