= DeWitt Wallace Decorative Arts Museum =

Coordinates: 37°16′7.9″N 76°42′16.6″W

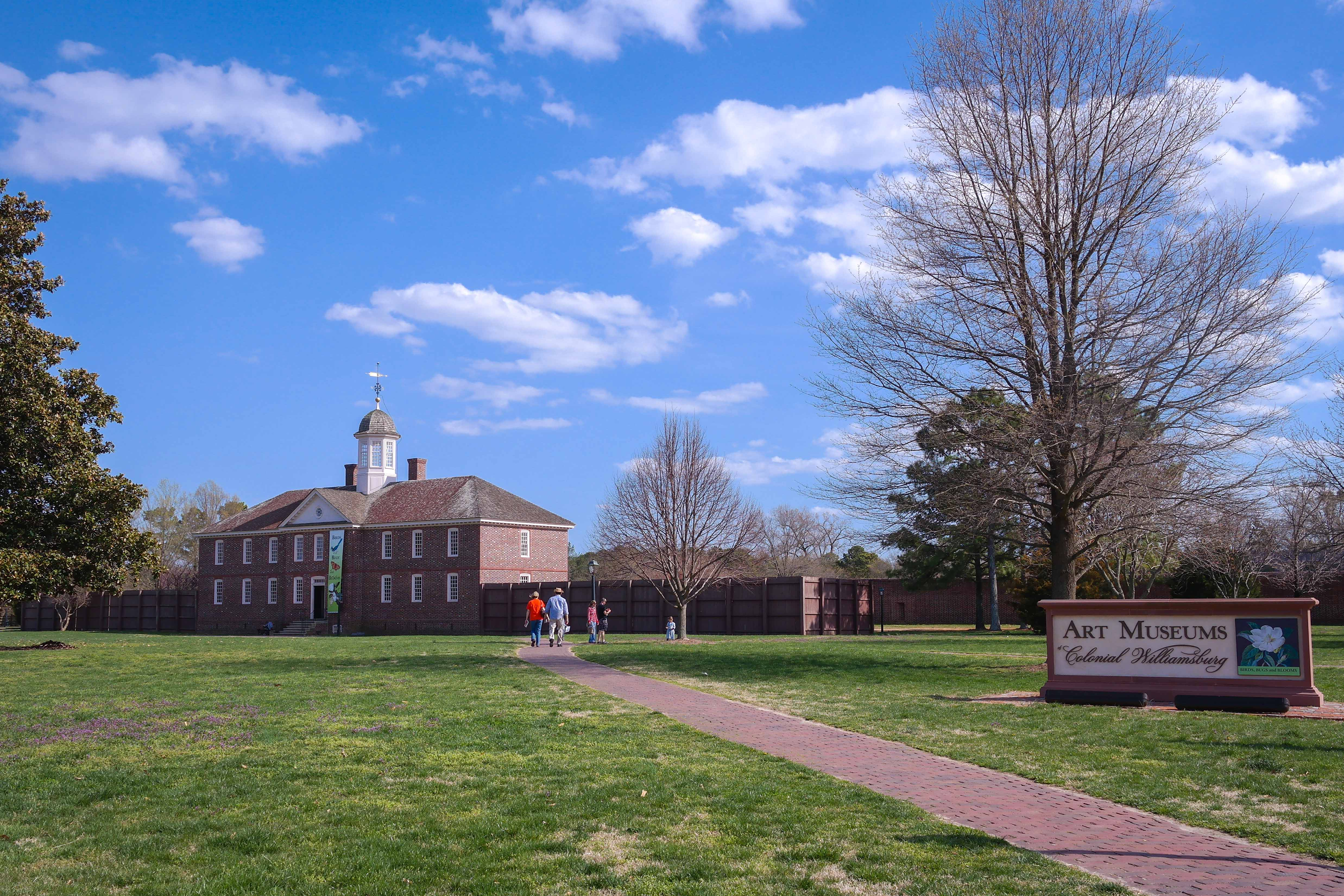
- Entrance, DeWitt Wallace Decorative Arts Museum at the Public Hospital of 1773
- Established: 1985
- Location: Colonial Williamsburg, 326 West Francis Street, Williamsburg, Virginia
- Type: Art gallery
- Visitors: 250,000 (2014)
- Website: DWDAM

The DeWitt Wallace Decorative Arts Museum (DWDAM), is a museum dedicated to British and American fine and decorative arts from 1670-1840, located in Williamsburg, Virginia.

Situated just outside the historic boundary of Colonial Williamsburg, DWDAM was founded with an initial 1982 donation by DeWitt Wallace (1889–1981) and his wife Lila Bell Acheson Wallace (1889–1984) — co-founders of Reader's Digest.

The Wallaces donated $12 million to finance reconstruction of the nation's first public mental hospital – the 1773 Public Hospital – and construction of the decorative arts museum — to be connected to the hospital by an underground concourse. Having initially opened in 1985, the museum has since expanded to include the Abby Aldrich Rockefeller Folk Art Museum and will undergo another expansion to open in 2019 with a new, street-level entrance.

The museum features diverse collections related to the founding of the United States — including furniture, paintings, silver, numismatics, ceramics, tools, textiles, glass, maps, weapons, media and other objects from the permanent Colonial Williamsburg collection.

== Facility ==
DWDAM is accessed through and underneath the Public Hospital of 1773, which commemorates the first mental health facility in the Colony of Virginia. The facility features a restaurant as well as the Hennage Auditorium, which offers lectures and musical performances.

In 2006, the Abby Aldrich Rockefeller Folk Art Museum relocated from its original location on S. England Street to share an expansion of the Wallace museum. Though co-located in a single building, both collections retain their respective names — and are together known as the Art Museums of Colonial Williamsburg.

In 2014, the Colonial Williamsburg Foundation announced a $40 million addition to the two co-located museums to break ground in April 2017 and open in 2019 — to include an expansion of 65,000sf and a new more accessible street-level entrance on Nassau Street.

== DeWitt and Lila Wallace ==
In 1922, the Wallaces published the first issue of their Reader's Digest, largely a carefully selected compilation of magazine articles of many types. The concept was well received and soon became one of the most widely circulated periodicals in the world.

Laurance Rockefeller, whose parents were the original financial drivers of Colonial Williamsburg, was a longtime friend and associate of DeWitt Wallace, and Wallace, in turn became a major funder of the Rockefeller's project. The Wallace's also appointed Laurance Rockefeller as an outside director at Reader's Digest. For relaxation, the Wallaces had been regular visitors to Colonial Williamsburg for over 50 years when they became involved as major financial supporters.

The museum opened in 1985, after the death of Dewitt Wallace in 1981 and Lila Wallace in 1984.
