= Colonial Williamsburg =

Historic district of Williamsburg, Virginia, US

- Williamsburg Historic District/Williamsburg Historical Triangle
- U.S. National Register of Historic Places
- U.S. National Historic Landmark District
- Virginia Landmarks Register
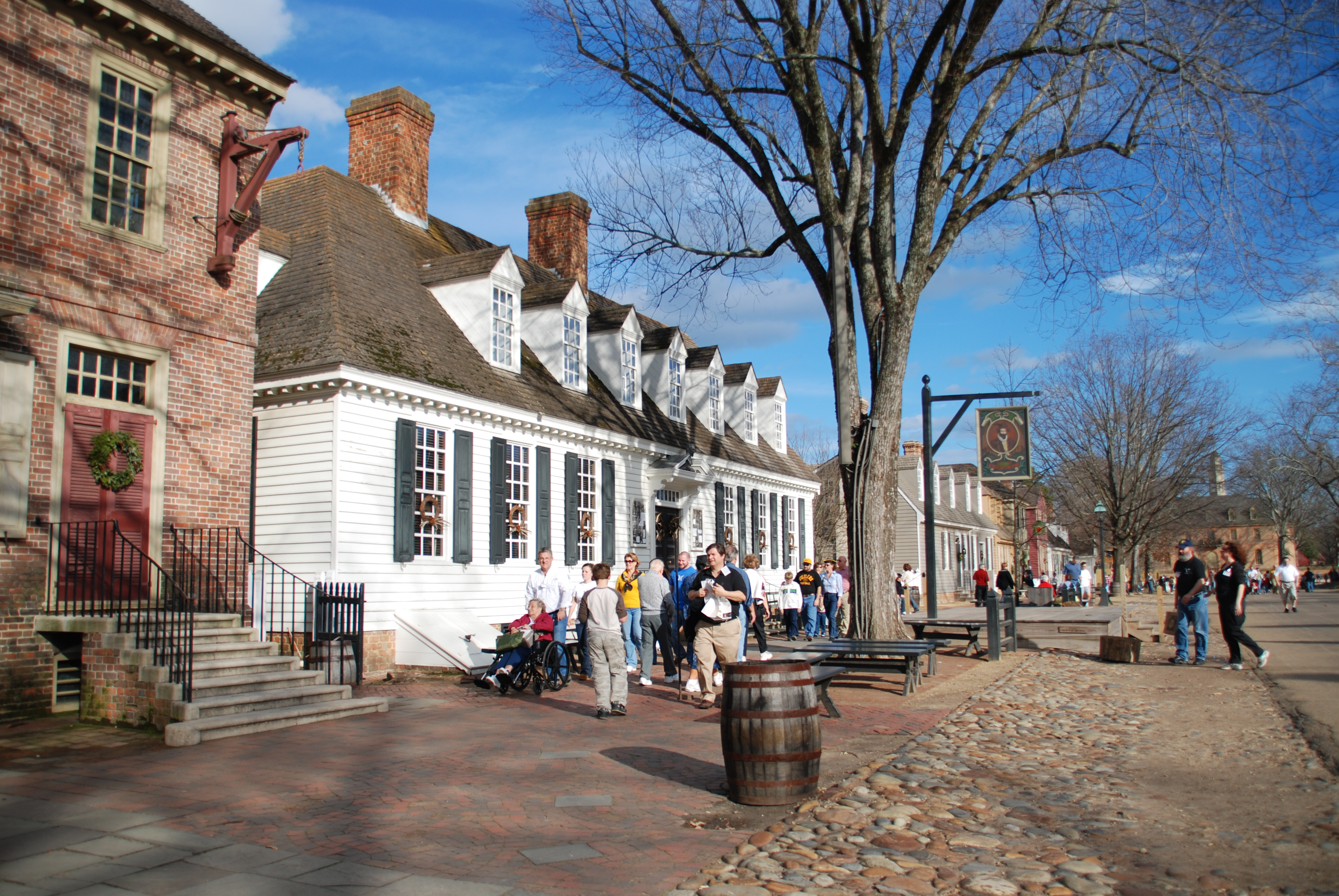
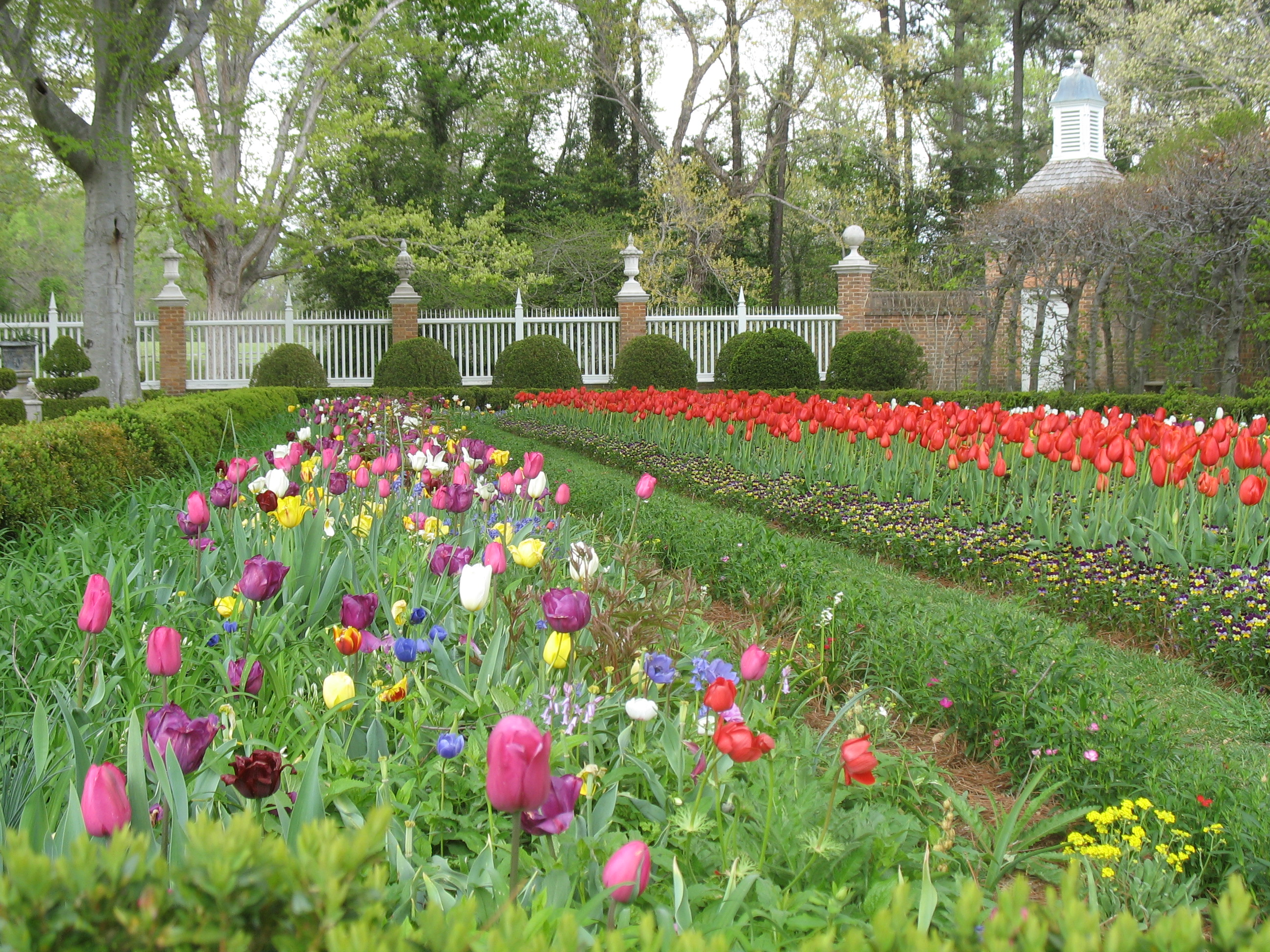
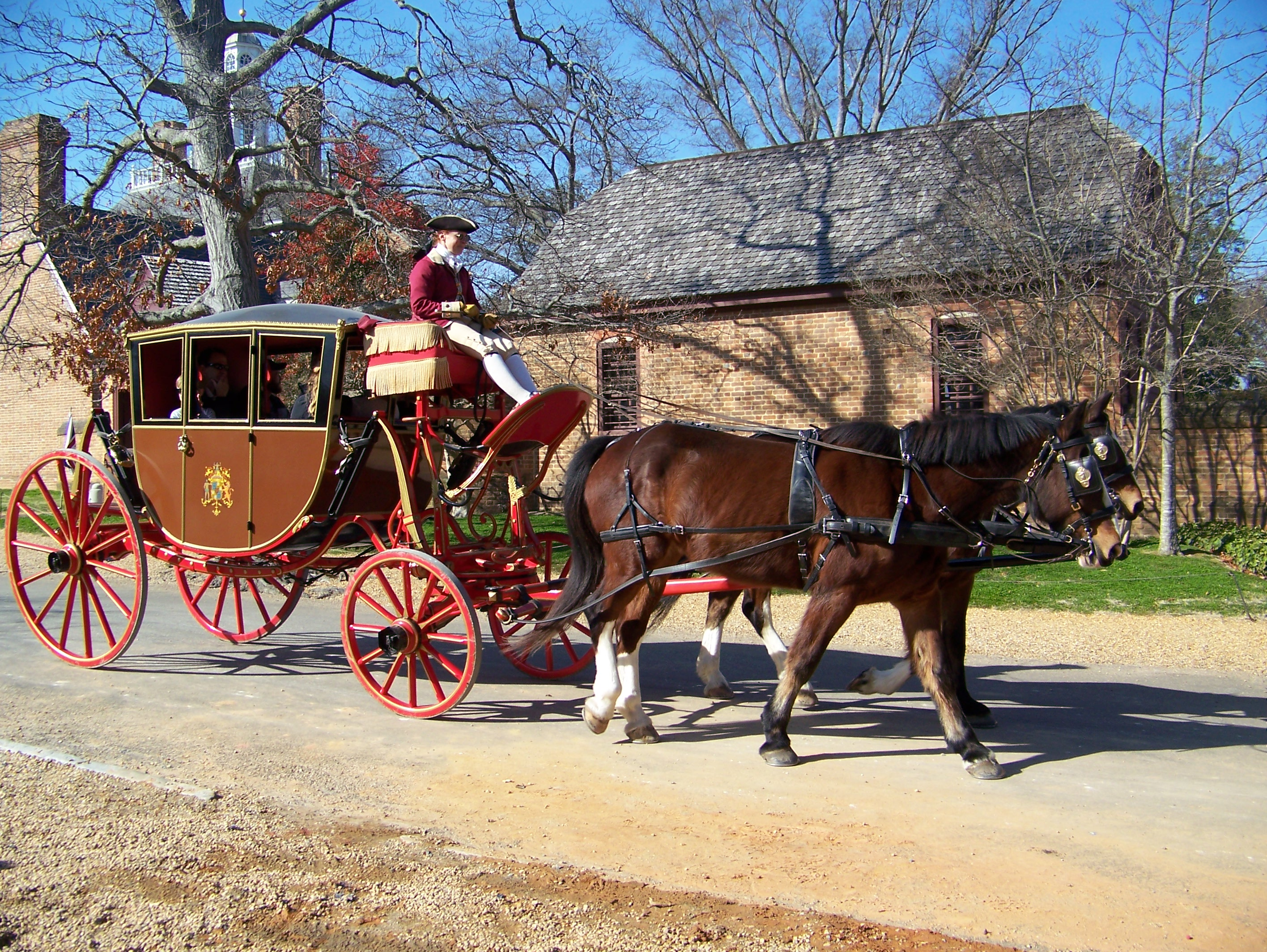
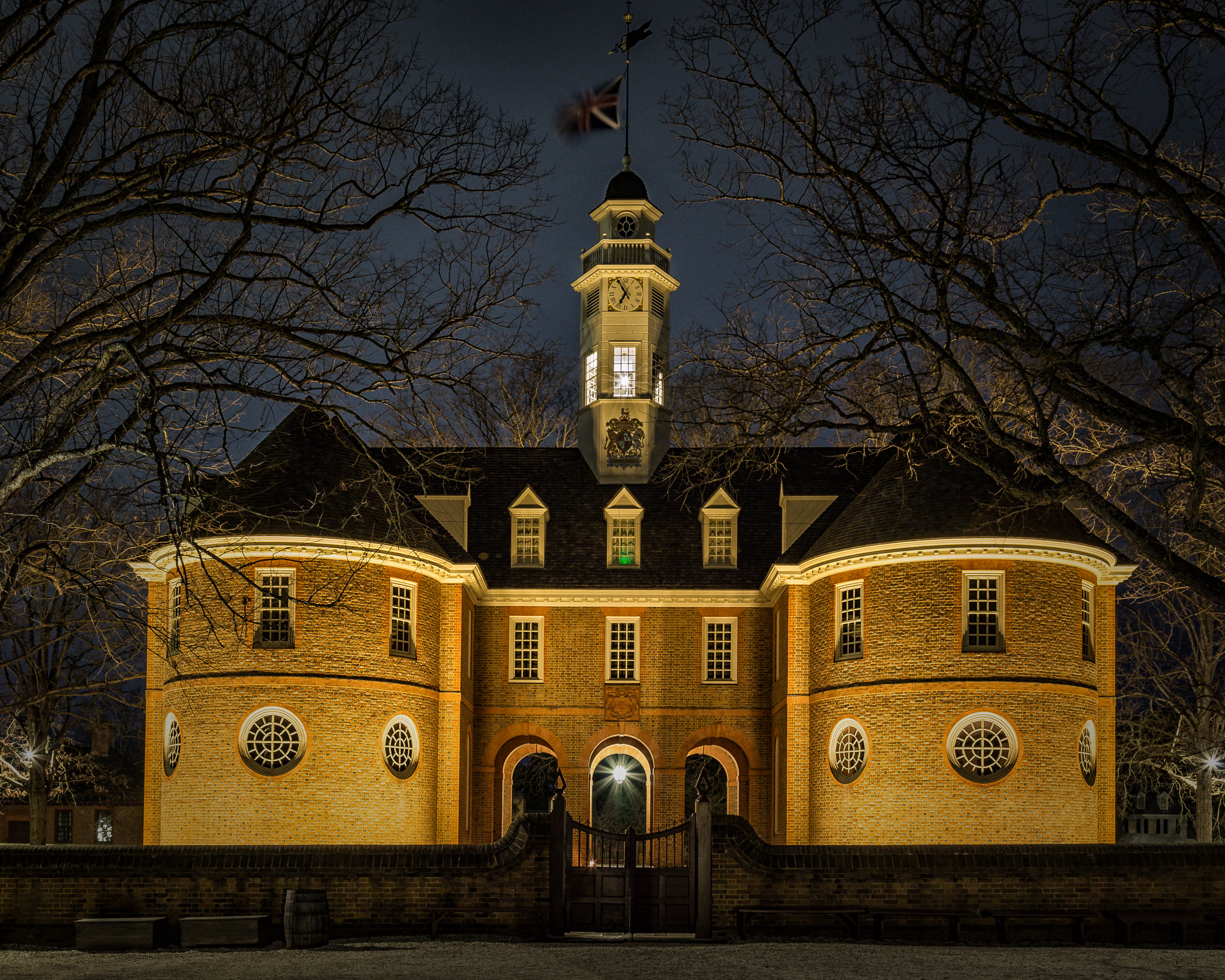
- From top to bottom (left to right): View of the reconstructed Raleigh Tavern on Duke of Gloucester Street; Gardens at the Governor's Palace; Carriage; Capitol Building at night

- Location within Virginia Location within the United States
- Interactive map showing the location of Williamsburg Historical District
- Location: Bounded by Francis, Waller, Nicholson, N. England, Lafayette, and Nassau Sts., Williamsburg, Virginia
- Coordinates: 37°16′17″N 76°42′00″W
- Area: 173 acres (70 ha)
- Built: 1699
- Architectural style: Georgian
- Website: www.colonialwilliamsburg.com
- NRHP reference No.: 66000925
- VLR No.: 137-0050

Significant dates
- Added to NRHP: October 15, 1966
- Designated NHLD: October 9, 1960
- Designated VLR: September 9, 1969

Colonial Williamsburg is a living-history museum and private foundation presenting a part of the historic district in Williamsburg, Virginia. Its 301-acre (122 ha) historic area includes several hundred restored or recreated buildings from the 18th century, when the city served as the capital of the Colony of Virginia. The district includes 17th-century, 19th-century, Colonial Revival, and more recent structures and reconstructions. The historic area includes three main thoroughfares and their connecting side streets, which are designed to represent how Williamsburg existed in the 18th century. Costumed employees work and dress as people did during the colonial era, sometimes using colonial grammar and diction.

In the late 1920s, the restoration of colonial Williamsburg was championed as a way to celebrate patriots and the early history of the United States. Proponents included W. A. R. Goodwin and other community leaders, the Association for the Preservation of Virginia Antiquities, Colonial Dames of America, United Daughters of the Confederacy, the United States Chamber of Commerce, and other organizations, and John D. Rockefeller Jr. and his wife Abby Aldrich Rockefeller.

Along with Jamestown, Yorktown, and Colonial Parkway, Colonial Williamsburg is part of the Historic Triangle in Virginia. The site was once used for conferences by world leaders and heads of state. In 1960, it was designated a National Historic Landmark District.

== Overview ==
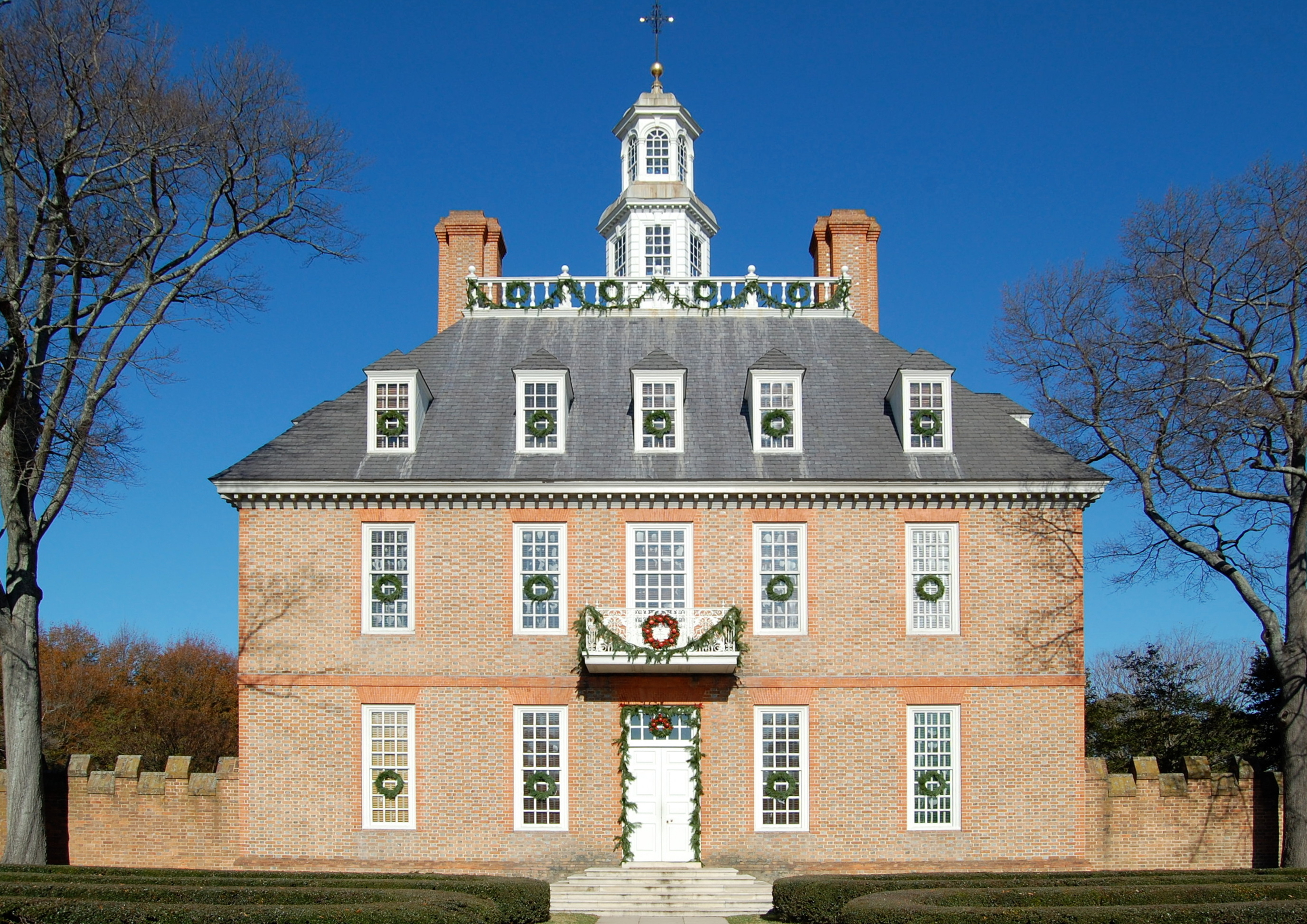
The Governor's Palace, reconstructed in the 1930s

The core of Colonial Williamsburg runs along Duke of Gloucester Street and the Palace Green that extends north and south perpendicular to it. This area is largely flat, with ravines and streams branching off on the periphery. Duke of Gloucester Street and other historic area thoroughfares are closed to motorized vehicles during the day, in favor of pedestrians, bicyclists, joggers, dog walkers, and animal-drawn vehicles.

Surviving colonial structures have been restored as close as possible to their 18th-century appearance, with traces removed of later buildings and improvements. Many of the once missing colonial structures were reconstructed on their original sites beginning in the 1930s. Animals, gardens, and dependencies add to the environment, such as kitchens, smokehouses, and privies. Some buildings and most gardens are open to tourists, with the exception of buildings serving as residences for Colonial Williamsburg employees, large donors, the occasional city official, and sometimes College of William & Mary associates.

Prominent buildings include the Raleigh Tavern, the Capitol, the Governor's Palace (all reconstructed), the Courthouse, the Wythe House, the Peyton Randolph House, the Magazine, and the independently owned and functioning Bruton Parish Church (all originals). Colonial Williamsburg's portion of the historic area begins east of the College of William & Mary's College Yard.

Four taverns have been reconstructed for use as restaurants and two for inns. There are craftsmen's workshops for period trades, including a printing shop, a shoemaker, a blacksmith, a cooperage, a cabinetmaker, a gunsmith, a wigmaker, and a silversmith. There are merchants selling tourist souvenirs, books, reproduction toys, pewterware, pottery, scented soap, etc. Some houses are open to tourists, including the Peyton Randolph House, the Geddy House, the Wythe House, and the Everard House, as are such public buildings as the Courthouse, the Capitol, the Magazine, the Public Hospital, and the Public Gaol. Former notorious inmates of the Gaol include pirate Blackbeard's crew who were kept there while they awaited trial.

Colonial Williamsburg operations extend to Merchants Square, a Colonial Revival commercial area designated a historic district in its own right. Nearby are the Abby Aldrich Rockefeller Folk Art Museum and DeWitt Wallace Decorative Arts Museum, operated by Colonial Williamsburg as part of its curatorial efforts.

== History of Williamsburg ==
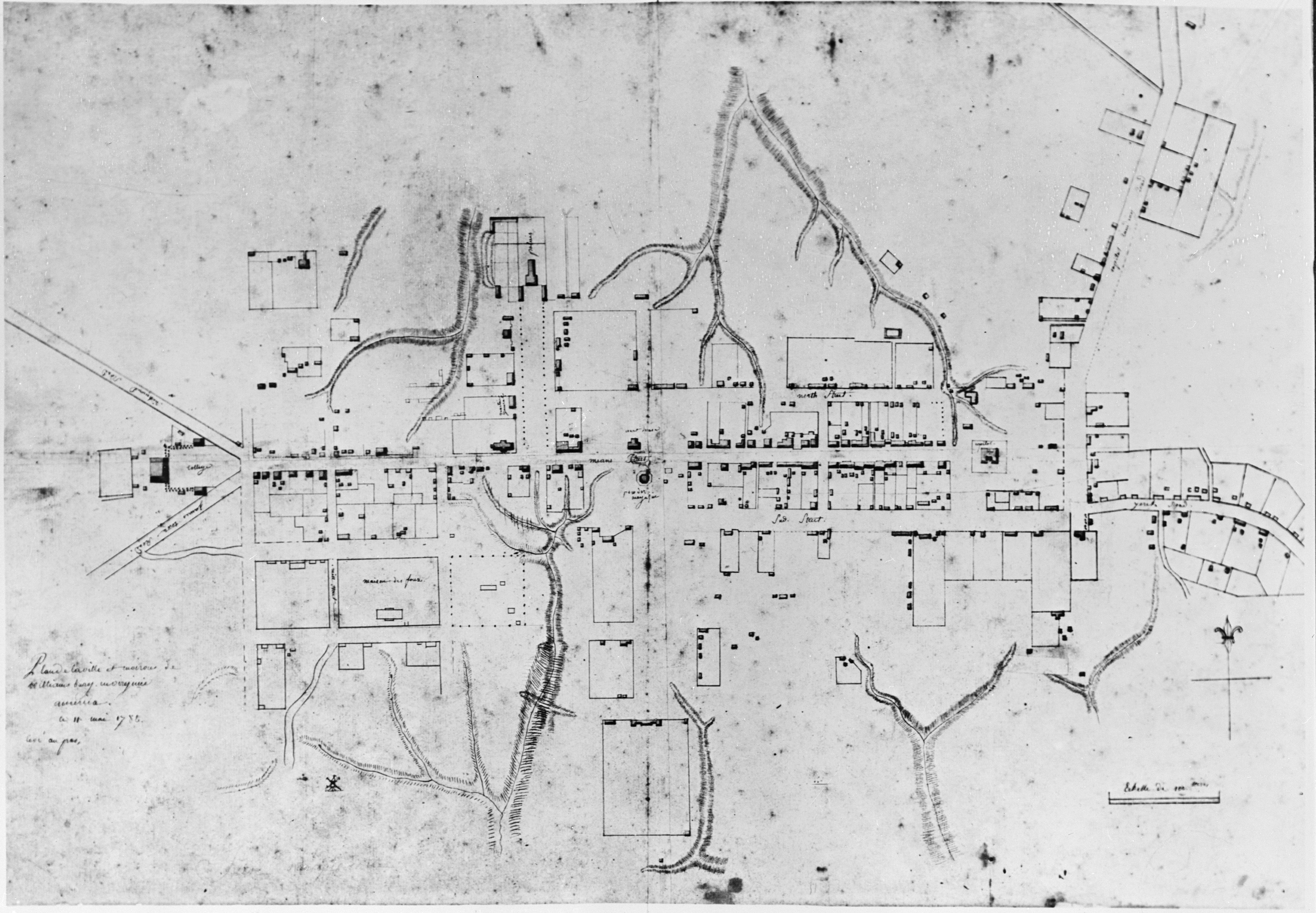
The "Frenchman's Map" showing Williamsburg in 1782; the map was a key piece of evidence in the restoration project

The Jamestown statehouse housed Virginia's government beginning in 1607, but talk of moving the capital gained momentum during Bacon's Rebellion (1676–1677), when rebels burned the statehouse. The Crown did not agree to move the capital until after the establishment of the College of William & Mary at Middle Plantation, in 1693, and another fire at the statehouse, in 1698. In 1699, Middle Plantation became Williamsburg, after William III of England, and the colony's new capital.

Williamsburg, one of the nation's first planned cities, was laid out under the supervision of Governor Francis Nicholson. Nicholson had the city surveyed and a grid implemented by Theodorick Bland, taking into consideration the brick College Building and the then decaying Bruton Parish Church buildings. The grid seems to have obliterated all but the remnants of an earlier plan that laid out the streets in the monogram of William and Mary, a W superimposed on an M. The main street was named Duke of Gloucester after the eldest son of Queen Anne. Nicholson named the street north of it Nicholson Street and the one south of it Francis Street, both after himself.

For 81 years of the 18th century, Williamsburg was the center of government, education, and culture in the Colony of Virginia. George Washington, Thomas Jefferson, Patrick Henry, James Monroe, James Madison, George Wythe, Peyton Randolph, Richard Henry Lee, and others furthered the forms of British government in the Commonwealth of Virginia and later helped adapt its preferred features to the needs of the new United States. The government moved to Richmond on the James River in 1780, under the leadership of Governor Thomas Jefferson, to be more central and accessible from western counties and less susceptible to British attack. There it remains today.

== History of Colonial Williamsburg ==
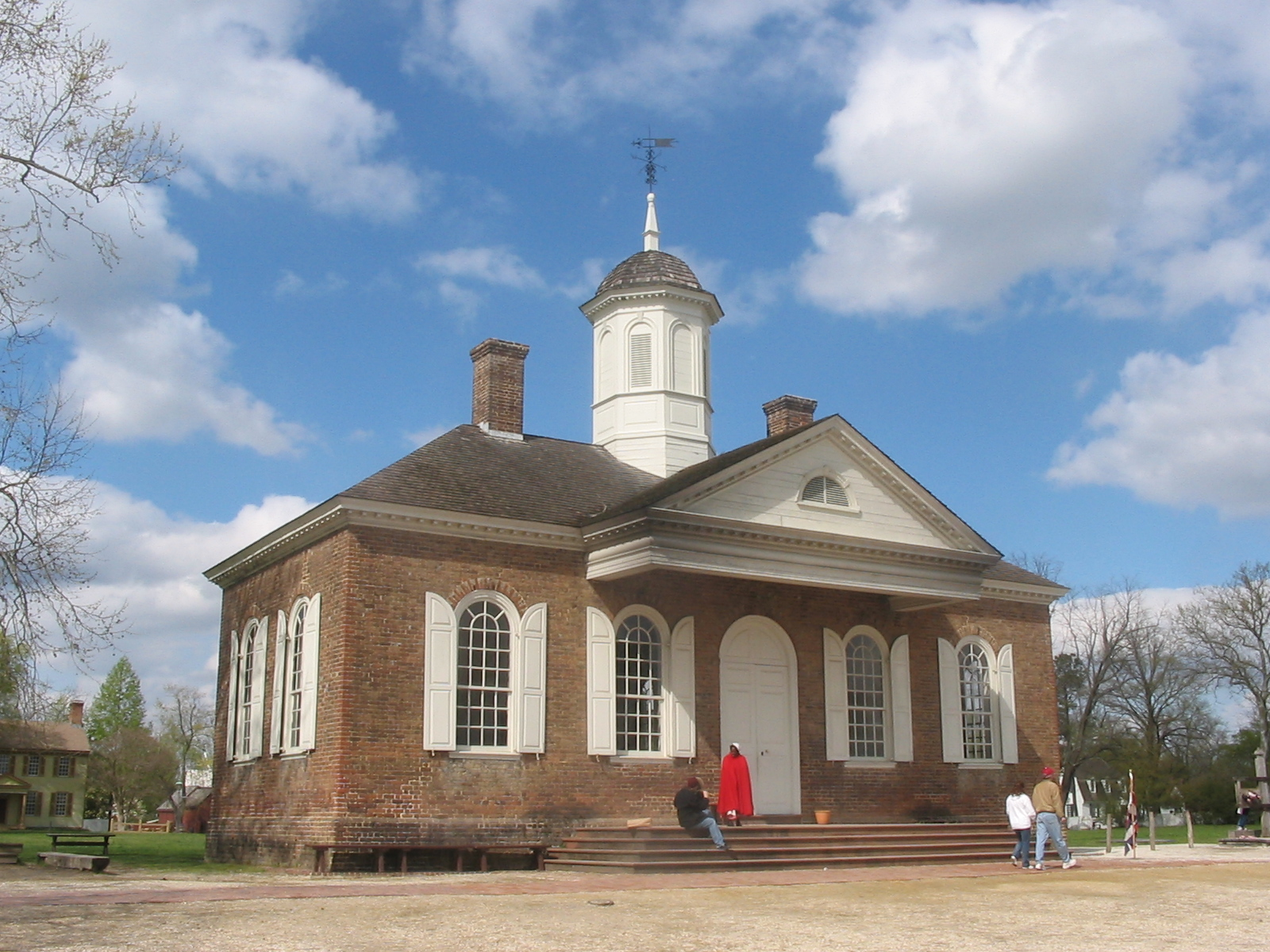
Restored Courthouse

With the seat of government removed, Williamsburg's businesses floundered or migrated to Richmond, and the city entered a long, slow period of stagnation and decay, although the town maintained much of its 18th-century aspect. It was captured by General George McClellan in 1862 and garrisoned during the Civil War, so the town escaped the devastation experienced by other Southern cities.

Williamsburg relied for jobs on the College of William & Mary, the Courthouse, and the Eastern Lunatic Asylum (now Eastern State Hospital); it was said that the "500 Crazies" of the asylum supported the "500 Lazies" of the college and town. Colonial-era buildings were modified, modernized, neglected, or destroyed. Development that accompanied construction of a World War I gun cotton plant at nearby Penniman and the coming of the automobile blighted the community, but the town kept its appeal to tourists. By the early 20th century, many older structures were in poor condition, no longer in use, or were occupied by squatters.

=== Goodwin and the Rockefellers ===
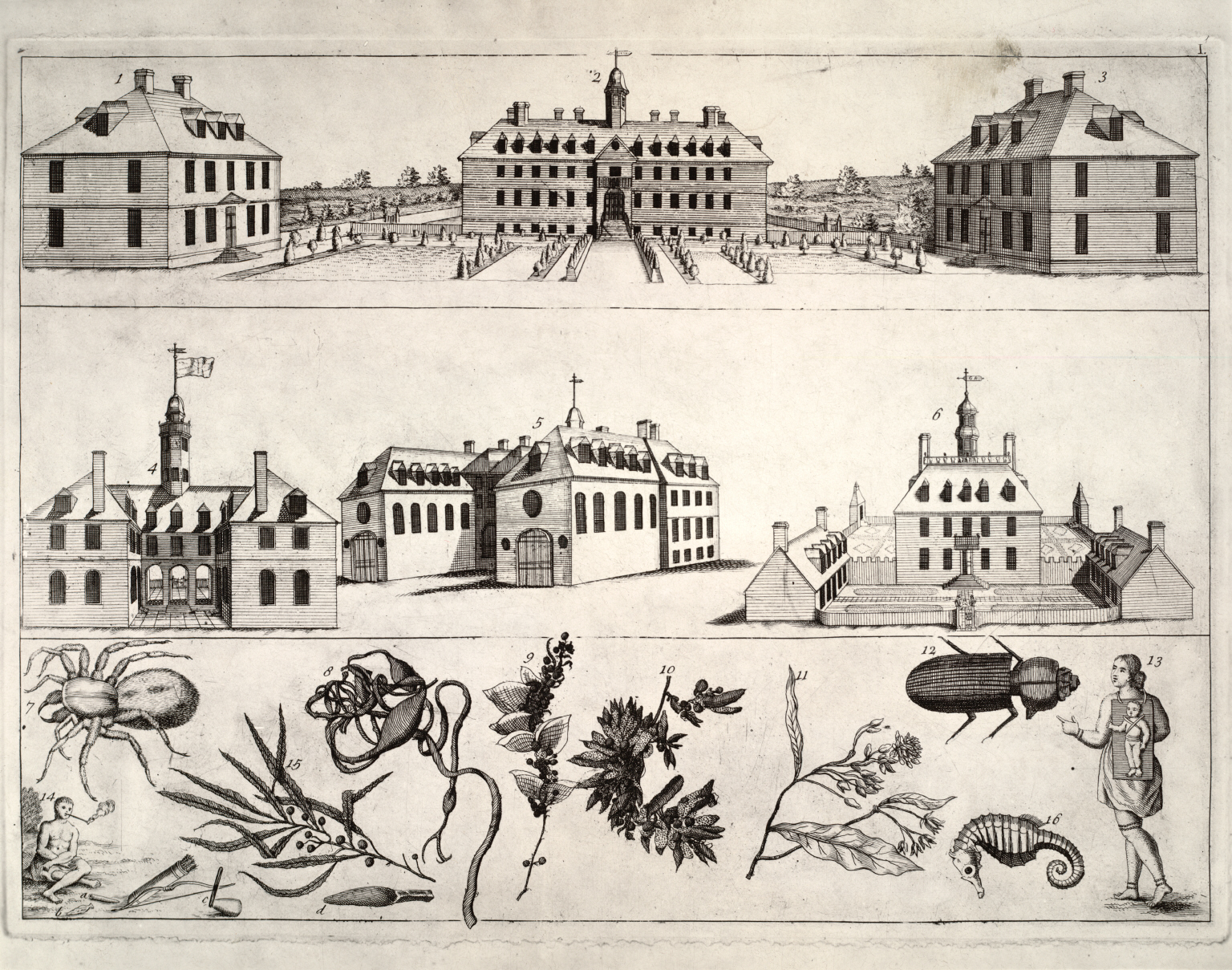
The Bodleian Plate, a mid-18th-century engraving plate depicting several major buildings from Williamsburg, used to reconstruct the Capitol, Governor's Palace, and to restore the Wren Building.

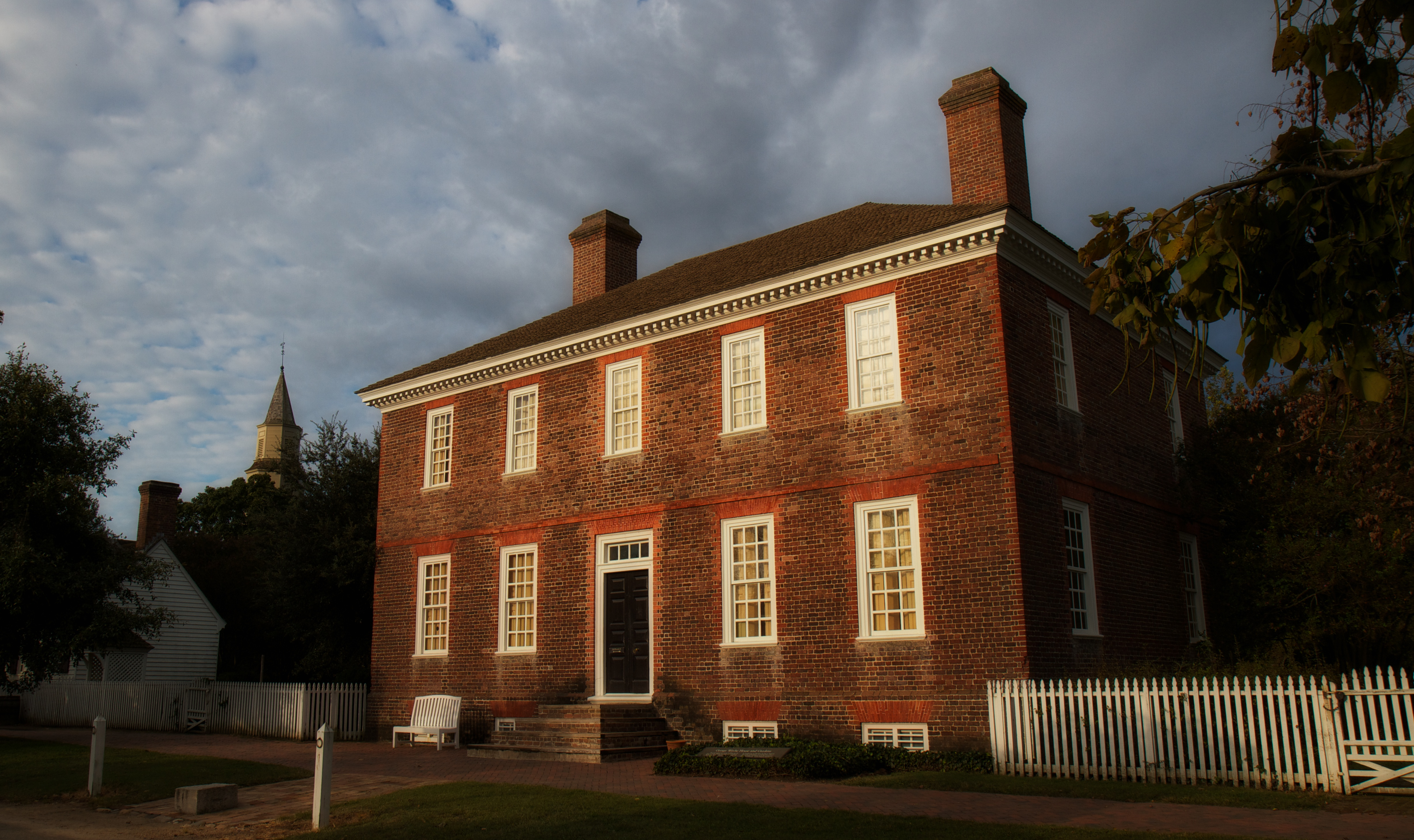
The house of George Wythe, one of 56 delegates to the Second Continental Congress in Philadelphia who unanimously adopted and signed the Declaration of Independence in 1776

The Reverend Dr. W. A. R. Goodwin became rector of Williamsburg's Bruton Parish Church in 1903 for the first of two periods. He was born in 1869 at Richmond to a Confederate veteran and his well-to-do wife and reared in rural Nelson County at Norwood. He was educated at Roanoke College, the University of Virginia, the University of Richmond, and the Virginia Theological Seminary. He first visited Williamsburg as a seminarian sent to recruit William & Mary students. He became rector at age 34 of the Bruton Parish Church, which at that time was riven by factions. He helped harmonize the congregation and assumed leadership of a flagging campaign to restore the 1711 church building. Goodwin and New York ecclesiastical architect J. Stewart Barney completed the church restoration in time for the 300th anniversary of the founding of America's Anglican Church at nearby Jamestown, Virginia, in 1907. Goodwin traveled the East Coast raising money for the project and establishing philanthropic contacts. Among the 1907 anniversary guests was J. P. Morgan, president of the Episcopal church's General Convention meeting that year in Richmond.

Goodwin accepted a call from wealthy St. Paul's Episcopal Church in Rochester, New York in 1908, and pastored there until his return in 1923 to Williamsburg to become a College of William & Mary fund-raiser and religious studies professor, as well as pastor of Yorktown's Episcopal church and a chapel at Toano. He had maintained his Williamsburg ties, periodically visiting the graves of his first wife and their son, using William & Mary's library for historical research, and vacationing. He saw the ongoing deterioration of colonial-era buildings.

He renewed his connections with the Association for the Preservation of Virginia Antiquities, whose membership included prominent and wealthy Virginians, and he helped to protect and repair the Magazine. He and other William & Mary professors saved the John Blair House from demolition to make way for a gasoline station, and they turned it into a faculty club. In 1924, the college launched a building and fund-raising drive, and Goodwin adopted Barney's proposal for saving other houses in the historic section of the town for use as student and faculty housing. He worked for two years to interest individuals such as Henry Ford and organizations such as the Dames of Colonial America to invest. He eventually obtained the support and financial commitment of John D. Rockefeller Jr., the wealthy son of the founder of Standard Oil. Rockefeller's wife Abby Aldrich Rockefeller also played a role. Goodwin returned to the Bruton Parish pulpit in 1926, keeping his college positions.

Rockefeller's first investment in a Williamsburg house had been a contribution to Goodwin's acquisition of the George Wythe House for next-door Bruton Church's parish house. Rockefeller's second investment was the purchase of the Ludwell–Paradise House in early 1927. Goodwin persuaded him to buy it on behalf of the college for housing in the event that Rockefeller should decide to restore the town. Rockefeller had agreed to pay for college restoration plans and drawings. He later considered limiting his restoration involvement to the college and an exhibition enclave, and he did not commit to the town's large scale restoration until November 22, 1927.

Rockefeller and Goodwin initially kept their acquisition plans secret because they were concerned that prices might rise if their purposes were known, quietly buying houses and lots and taking deeds in blank. Goodwin took Williamsburg attorney Vernon M. Geddy, Sr. into his confidence, without exposing Rockefeller as silent partner. Geddy did much of the title research and legal work related to properties in what became the restored area. He later drafted the Virginia corporate papers for the project, filed them with the Virginia State Corporation Commission, and served briefly as the first president of the Colonial Williamsburg Foundation.

That much property changing hands was noticed by newspaper reporters. After 18 months of increasingly excited rumors, Goodwin and Rockefeller revealed their plans at county and town meetings on June 11 and 12, 1928. The purpose was to obtain the consent of the citizens and enlist them in the project. The restoration project required a new high school and two public greens. The city retained ownership of its streets, an arrangement that forestalled later proposals to raise revenue by charging an admission fee.

Some townsmen had qualms. Major S. D. Freeman, retired Army officer and school board president, said, "We will reap dollars, but will we own our town? Will you not be in the position of a butterfly pinned to a card in a glass cabinet, or like a mummy unearthed in the tomb of Tutankhamun?" (Note: The tomb's 1922 discovery had been a global phenomenon.) To gain the cooperation of people reluctant to sell their homes to the Rockefeller organization, the restoration offered free life tenancies and maintenance in exchange for ownership. Freeman sold his house outright and moved to Virginia's Middle Peninsula.

=== Restoration and reconstruction ===
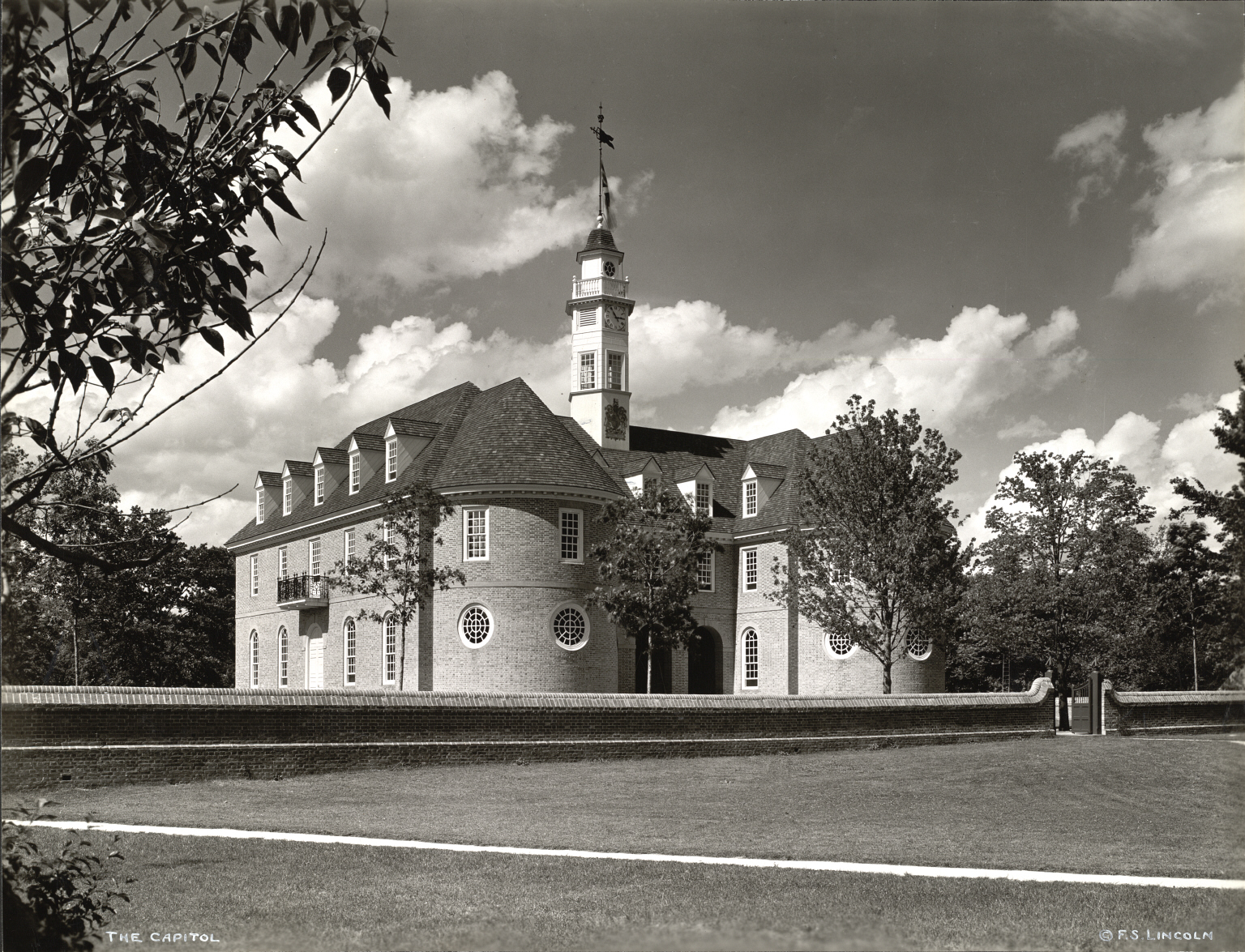
The Capitol Building in Williamsburg following its mid-20th century reconstruction

Rockefeller management decided against giving custody of the project to the state-run college, ostensibly to avoid political control by Virginia's Democratic Byrd Machine, but they restored the school's Wren Building, Brafferton House, and President's House. Colonial Williamsburg pursued a program of partial re-creation of some of the rest of the town. It featured shops, taverns, and open-air markets in a colonial style.

The first lead architect in the project was William G. Perry of Perry, Shaw & Hepburn, with Arthur Asahel Shurcliff as the chief landscape architect. An Advisory Board of Architects was selected to provide guidance for the project. Prominent architects who served on the advisory board included Robert P. Bellows, Fiske Kimball, A. Lawrence Kocher, Philip N. Stern, Merril C. Lee, W. Duncan Lee, Marcellus E. Wright Sr., Edmund S. Campbell, Orin M. Bullock Jr., and R. E. Lee Taylor.

During the restoration, the project demolished 720 buildings that postdated 1790, many of which dated from the 19th century. Some decrepit 18th-century homes were demolished, leading to some controversy. The Governor's Palace and the Capitol building were reconstructed on their sites with the aid of period illustrations, written descriptions, early photographs, and informed guesswork. The grounds and gardens were almost all recreated in authentic Colonial Revival style.

The Capitol is a 1930s Beaux-Arts approximation of the 1705 building at the east end of the historic area. It was designed by the architectural firm Perry, Shaw & Hepburn, who had it rebuilt as they thought it should have been, not as it was, despite objections and archaeological evidence to the contrary. The modern reconstruction is off-center, its floorplan is skewed, and its interior is overly elaborate. The 1705 original was an H-shaped brick statehouse with double-apsed, oarsmen-circular southern facades, but it burned in the 1740s and was replaced by an H-shaped rectangular edifice.

In the second building, Patrick Henry protested against the Stamp Act of 1765 and first spoke against King George. George Mason introduced the Virginia Bill of Rights there, and from it Virginia's government instructed its delegates to the Second Continental Congress to propose national independence. Its likeness only exists in a period woodcut and in architectural renderings considered but shelved by the Restoration.

The present building was dedicated with a ceremonial meeting of the Virginia General Assembly on February 24, 1934. Virginia's state legislators have reassembled for a day every other year in the Capitol.

Of the approximately 500 buildings reconstructed or restored, 88 are labelled original. They include outbuildings such as smokehouses, privies, and sheds. The foundation reconstructed the Capitol and Governor's Palace on their 18th-century foundations and preserved some below-ground 18th-century brickwork, classifying them as reconstructions. It rebuilt William & Mary's Wren Building on its original foundation, which burned four times in 230 years and was much modified; it saved some above-ground brickwork and classified the result as original.

On the western side of the city, beginning in the 1930s, retail shops were grouped under the name Merchants Square to accommodate and mollify displaced local merchants. Increasing rents and tourist-driven businesses eventually drove out all the old-line community enterprises except a dress shop. One of the last to be forced out was a locally popular drugstore complete with lunch counter.

=== Outlying landscapes and viewsheds ===
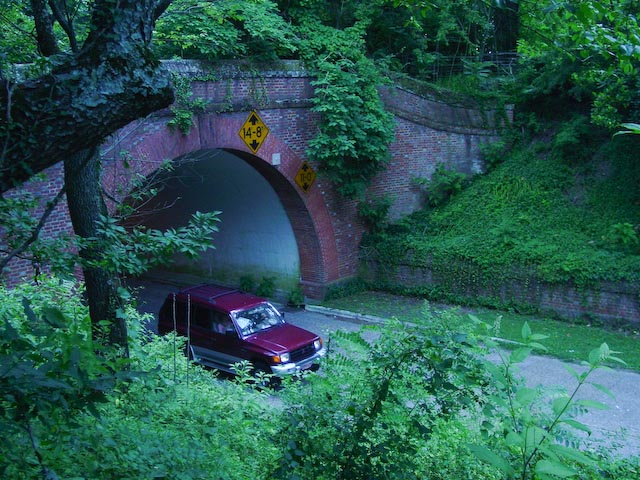
Entrance to the tunnel of the Colonial Parkway, which runs beneath the historic area linking it with Jamestown and Yorktown

Beginning in the earliest period of the restoration, Colonial Williamsburg acquired acreage in Williamsburg and the two counties which adjoin it, notably to the north and east of the historic area to preserve natural views and facilitate the experience of as much of the late 18th-century environment as possible. This was described as a "rural, wooded sense of arrival" along corridors to the historic area.

In 2006, announcing a conservation easement on acreage north of the Visitor Center, Colonial Williamsburg President and Chairman Colin G. Campbell said its restrictions protected the view and preserved other features: "This viewshed helps to set the stage for visitors in their journey from modern day life into the 18th-century setting. At the same time, this preserves the natural environment around Queen's Creek and protects a significant archaeological site. It is a tangible and important example of how the Foundation is protecting the vital greenbelt surrounding Colonial Williamsburg's historic area for future generations". The Colonial Parkway, which includes a tunnel running beneath the historic area, was planned and is maintained to reduce modern intrusions.

Near the principal planned roadway approach to Colonial Williamsburg, similar design priorities were employed for the relocated U.S. Route 60 near the intersection of Bypass Road and North Henry Street. Prior to the restoration, U.S. Route 60 ran down Duke of Gloucester Street through town. To shift the traffic away from the historic area, Bypass Road was planned and built through farmland and woods about a mile north of town. Shortly thereafter, when Route 143 was built as the Merrimack Trail (originally designated State Route 168) in the 1930s, the protected vista was extended along Route 132 in York County to the new road, and two new bridges were built across Queen's Creek.

Goodwin, who served as a liaison with the community, as well as with state and local officials, was instrumental in such efforts. Nevertheless, some in the Rockefeller organization, regarding him as meddlesome, gradually pushed Goodwin to the periphery of the Restoration and by the time of his death in 1939 Colonial Williamsburg's administrator, Kenneth Chorley of New York, was indiscreetly at loggerheads with the local reverend. Goodwin's relationship with Rockefeller remained warm, however, and his interest in the project remained keen. Colonial Williamsburg dedicated its headquarters in 1940, naming it The Goodwin Building.

About 30 years later, when Interstate 64 was planned and built in the 1960s and early 1970s, from the designated "Colonial Williamsburg" exit, the additional land along Merrimack Trail to Route 132 was similarly protected from development. Today, visitors encounter no commercial properties before they reach the Visitor Center.

In addition to considerations regarding highway travel, Williamsburg's brick Chesapeake and Ohio Railway passenger station was less than 20 years old and one of the newer ones along the rail line, it was replaced with a larger station in Colonial style that was located just out of sight and within walking distance of the historic area, on the northern edge of Peacock Hill.

Farther afield was Carter's Grove Plantation. It was begun by a grandson of wealthy planter Robert "King" Carter. For over 200 years, it had gone through a succession of owners and modifications. In the 1960s after the death of its last resident, Ms. Molly McRae, Carter's Grove Plantation came under the control of Winthrop Rockefeller's Sealantic Foundation, which gave it to Colonial Williamsburg as a gift. Archaeologist Ivor Noel Hume discovered in its grounds the remains of 1620s Wolstenholme Towne, a downriver outpost of Jamestown. The Winthrop Rockefeller Archaeology Museum, built just above the site, showcased artifacts from the dig. Colonial Williamsburg operated Carter's Grove until 2003 as a satellite facility of Colonial Williamsburg, with interpretive programs. The property has since been sold.

==== Kingsmill ====
Between Carter's Grove and the Historic District was the largely vacant Kingsmill tract, as well as a small military outpost of Fort Eustis known as Camp Wallace (CW). In the mid-1960s, CW owned land that extended from the historic district to Skiffe's Creek, at the edge of Newport News near Lee Hall. Distant from the historic area and not along the protected sight paths, it was developed in the early 1970s, under CW Chairman Winthrop Rockefeller.

Rockefeller, a son of Abby and John D. Rockeller Jr., was a frequent visitor and was particularly fond of Carter's Grove in the late 1960s. He became aware of some expansion plans elsewhere on the Peninsula of his St. Louis-based neighbor, August Anheuser Busch, Jr., head of Anheuser-Busch. By the time Rockefeller and Busch completed their discussions, the biggest changes in the Williamsburg area were underway since the restoration began 40 years before. Among the goals were to complement Colonial Williamsburg attractions and enhance the local economy.

The large tract consisting primarily of the Kingsmill land was sold by the Colonial Williamsburg Foundation to Anheuser-Busch for planned development. The Anheuser-Busch investment included building a large brewery, the Busch Gardens Williamsburg theme park, the Kingsmill planned resort community, and McLaws Circle, an office park. Anheuser-Busch and related entities from that development plan comprise the area's largest employment base, surpassing both Colonial Williamsburg and the local military bases.

=== Later history ===
With its historic significance to American democracy, it and the surrounding area was the site of a summit meeting of world leaders, the first World Economic Conference in 1983, and hosted visiting royalty, including King Hussein of Jordan and Emperor Hirohito of Japan. Queen Elizabeth II paid two royal visits to Williamsburg during her reign, once in October 1957 and again, in May 2007, both to celebrate the anniversaries of the founding of nearby Jamestown.

The Democratic Party rebuttal to President Donald Trump's 2026 State of the Union Address was delivered by Virginia Governor Abigail Spanberger from the Colonial Williamsburg historic area on February 24, 2026. In November of the same year, the Colonial Williamsburg Foundation announced a 5-year, $600 million expansion, which would include physical improvements to the campus, increased educational offerings in archaeology and horticulture, as well as establish an initiative called the National Institute for the Constitution and Civic Virtue, which The Washington Post reported would focus on "the Constitution and the Bill of Rights," to be led by Jay Rosen.

== Colonial Williamsburg today ==
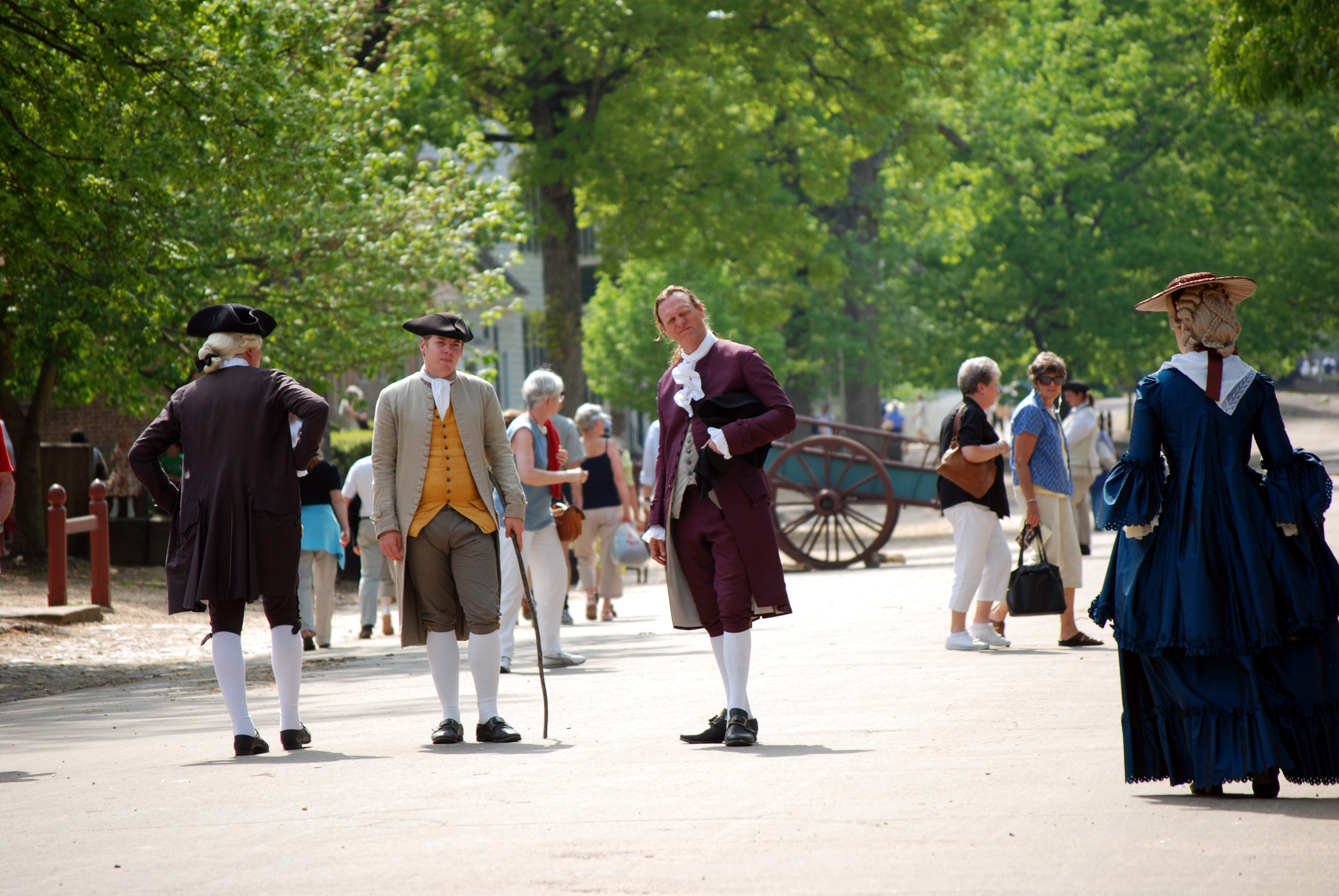
Several interpreters on Duke of Gloucester Street

Colonial Williamsburg is an open-air assemblage of buildings populated with historical reenactors (interpreters) who explain and demonstrate aspects of daily life in the past. The reenactors work, dress, and talk as they would have in colonial times.

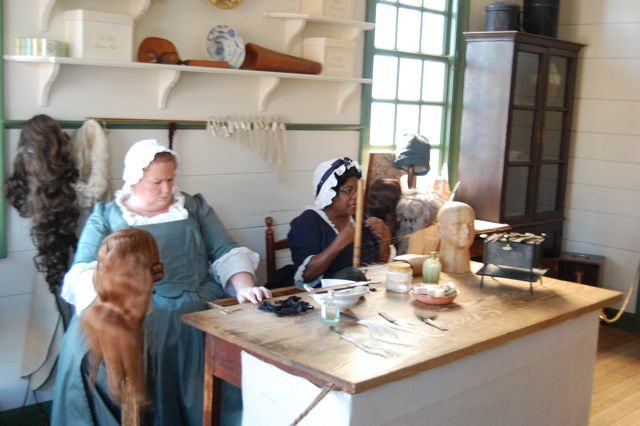
Costumed apprentices demonstrate the process of wig making and significance of wigs in Colonial life.

While there are many living history museums (such as Old Sturbridge Village in Massachusetts, Old Salem in Winston-Salem, or Castell Henllys in the UK), Colonial Williamsburg is unusual for having been constructed from a living town whose inhabitants and post-Colonial-era buildings were removed. Also unlike other living history museums, Colonial Williamsburg allows anyone to walk through the historic district free of charge, at any hour of the day. Charges apply only to those visitors who wish to enter the historic buildings to see arts and crafts demonstrations during daylight hours, or attend scheduled outdoor performances such as the Revolutionary City programs.

The Visitor Center near the Colonial Parkway features a short film, Williamsburg: the Story of a Patriot, which debuted in 1957. Visitors may park at the Visitor Center, as automobiles are restricted from the restored area. Wheelchair-accessible shuttle bus service is provided to stops around the perimeter of the Historic District of Williamsburg, as well as Jamestown and Yorktown, during the peak summer season.

The costumed interpreters have not always worn Colonial dress. As an experiment in anticipation of the Bicentennial, in summer 1973 the hostesses were dressed in special red, white, and blue polyester knit pantsuits. This confused and disappointed visitors, so the experiment was dropped at the end of summer, and for the Bicentennial, docents wore historical costumes.

Many reenactments by Colonial Williamsburg's historical interpreters wearing period costumes are posted online. In addition to simple period reenactments, Colonial Williamsburg, at various times, features themes, including the founding of Williamsburg, occupation by British forces, or visits from Colonial leaders of the day, including General George Washington.

Some of the costumed interpreters work with animals. The Colonial Williamsburg Rare Breed Program helps to preserve and showcase animals that would have been present during the colonial period. John P. Hunter's book on the topic, Link to the Past, Bridge to the Future: Colonial Williamsburg's Animals, explains the importance of, as well as details how interpreters are a part, of this program.

Colonial Williamsburg is a partly pet-friendly destination. Leashed pets are permitted in specific outdoor areas and may be taken on shuttle buses, but are not permitted in buildings except the visitor center.

=== Grand Illumination ===
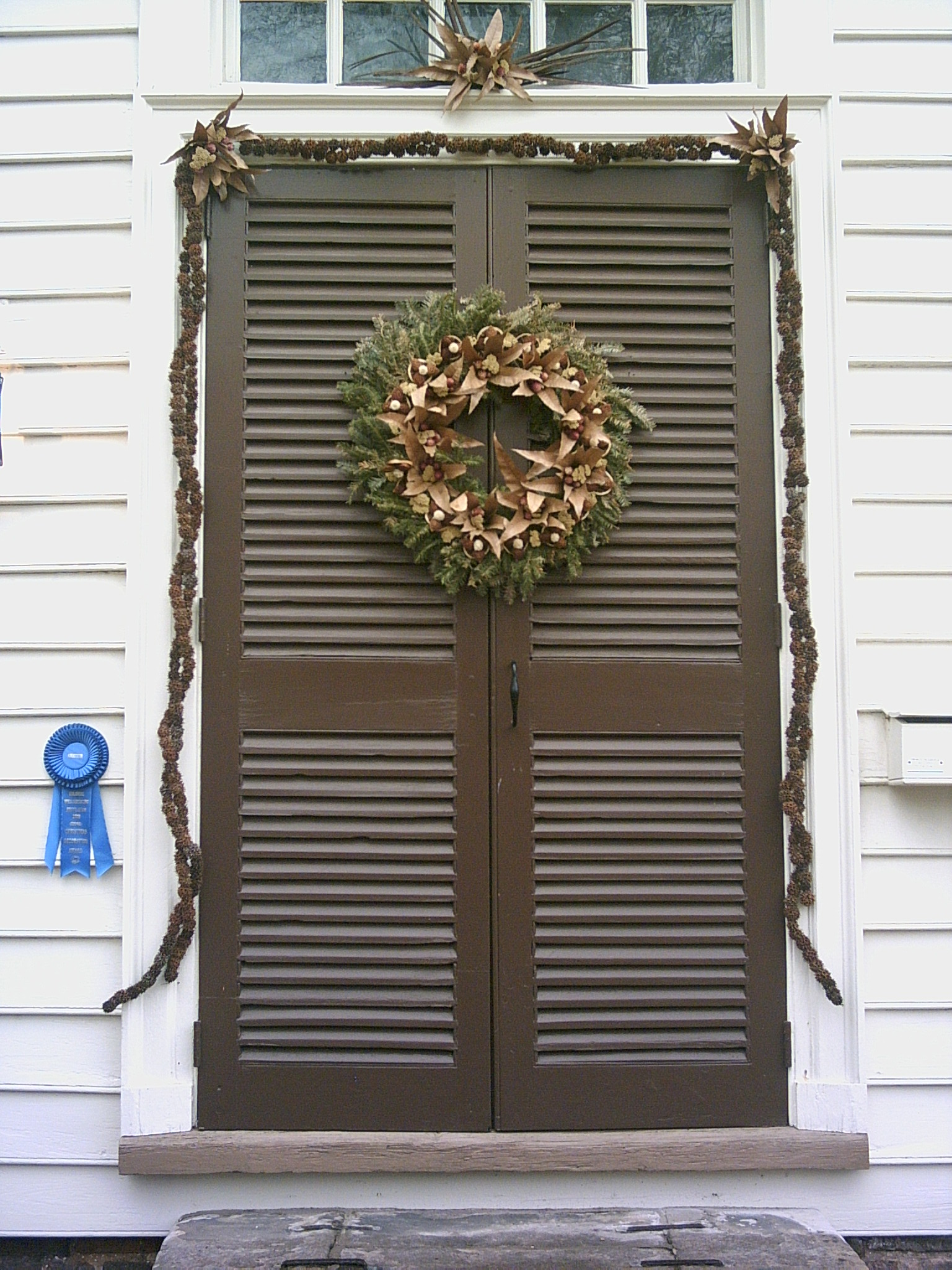
Traditional, Colonial-style Christmas decorations in Williamsburg

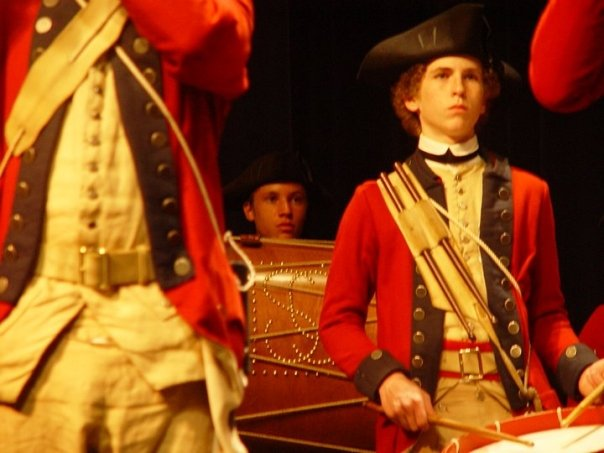
Performers in "Drummers Call" show from 2007 at the Kimball Theatre

The Grand Illumination is an outdoor ceremony and mass celebration involving the simultaneous activation of thousands of Christmas lights each year on the first Sunday of December. The ceremony, Goodwin's idea, began in 1935, loosely based on a colonial (and English) tradition of placing lighted candles in the windows of homes and public buildings to celebrate a special event, such as the winning of a war or the birthday of the reigning monarch. The Grand Illumination also has incorporated extravagant fireworks displays, loosely based on the 18th-century practice of using fireworks to celebrate significant occasions.

=== Educational outreach ===
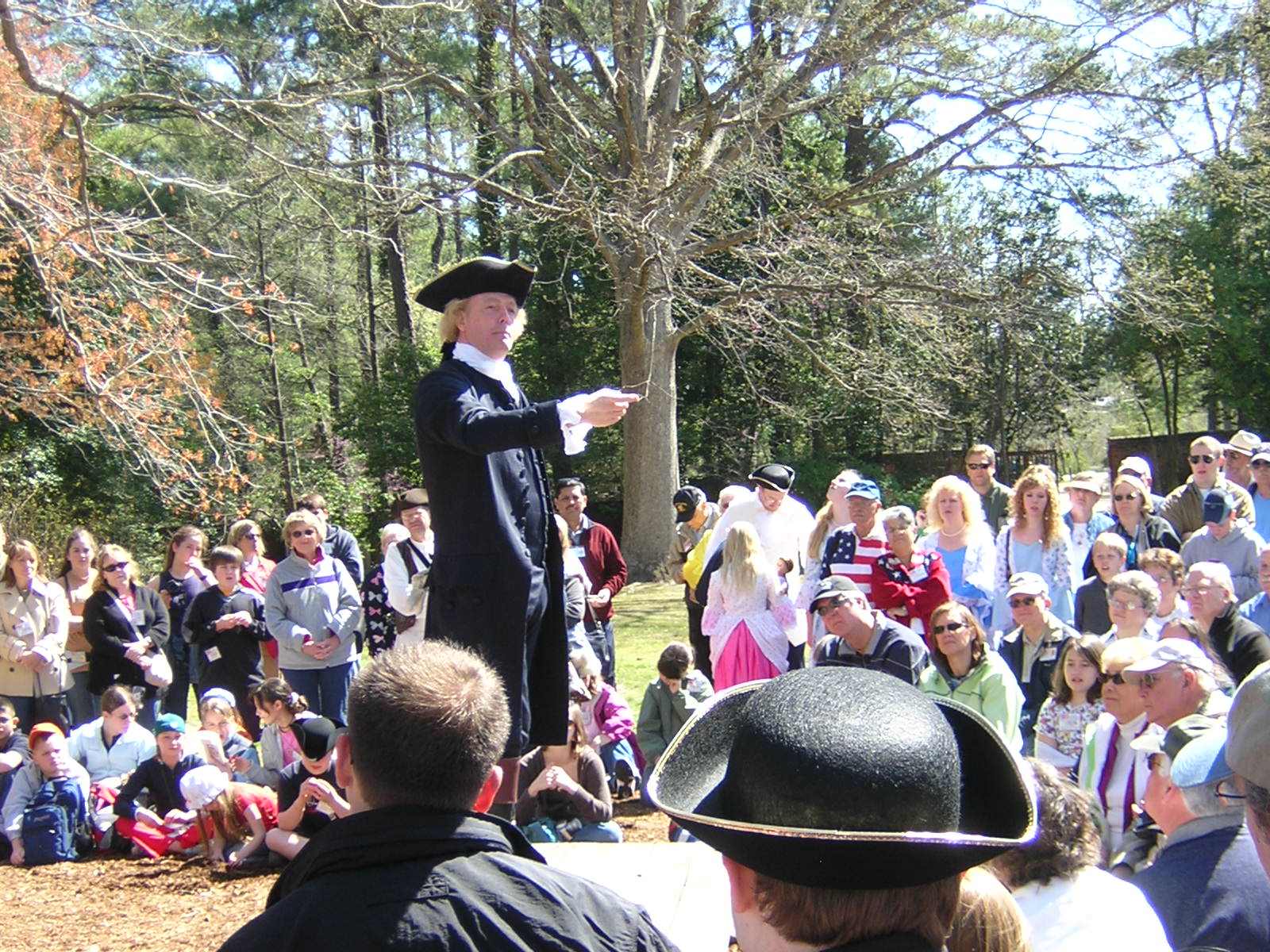
Thomas Jefferson reenactment by actor Bill Barker at Colonial Williamsburg

In the 1990s, Colonial Williamsburg implemented the Teaching Institute in Early American History, and Electronic Field Trips. Designed for elementary and middle/high school teachers, the institute offers workshops for educators to meet with historians, character interpreters, and to prepare instructional materials for use in the classroom. Electronic Field Trips are a series of multimedia classroom presentations available to schools. Each program is designed around a particular topic in history and includes a lesson plan as well as classroom and online activities. Monthly live broadcasts on local PBS television stations allow participating classes to interact with historical interpreters via telephone or internet.

In 2007, Colonial Williamsburg launched iCitizenForum.com. A mix of historical documents and user-generated content such as blogs, videos, and message boards, the site aims to prompt discussion about the roles, rights, and responsibilities of citizens in a democracy. Preservation of the Founding Fathers' ideals in light of recent world events is a focus of the site.

Colonial Williamsburg hired former NBC journalist Lloyd Dobyns to produce the early podcasts for the museum usually interviewing staff about their specialties. Podcast interviews continued by others after his retirement.

=== John D. Rockefeller Jr. Library ===
The John D. Rockefeller Jr. Library is considered the "intellectual center of the Colonial Williamsburg Foundation." The library houses special collections including:

- Rare books from the 15th to 20th centuries
- Original manuscripts from the 17th to 20th centuries
- 18th-century British and American newspapers
- Reproduction maps of the Williamsburg region
- Reproductions of manuscripts from the 17th to 19th centuries in a variety of formats.

The library also has a visual resources collection, Colonial Williamsburg Foundation corporate archives, media collections, and photo reproduction and licensing services. The library publishes a quarterly newsletter in digital format, as well as a podcast.

=== Merchandising ===
Colonial American craft items, some manufactured abroad, are sold in historic area stores. Many shops sell such items as floral and herbal soaps, knitted hats, and handcrafted toys made from wood and clay.

== Management ==
A workshop seen on Duke of Gloucester street

Colonial Williamsburg is owned and operated as a living museum by the Colonial Williamsburg Foundation, the non-profit entity endowed initially by the Rockefeller family and over the years by others, notably Reader's Digest founders Lila and DeWitt Wallace, and Philadelphia publisher Walter Annenberg.

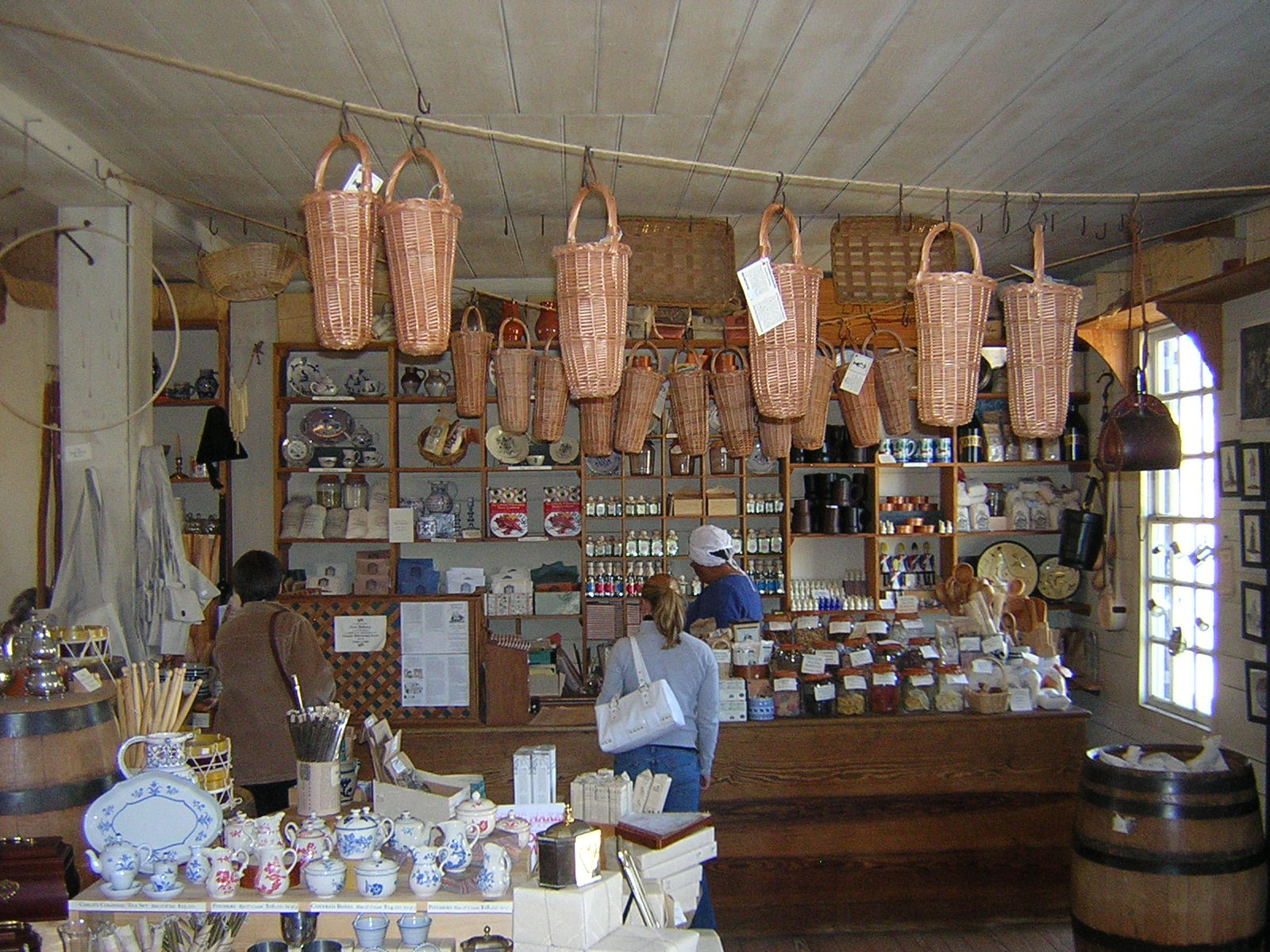
Interior of Greenhow store. Only the tourists are out of time/place

The major goal of the restoration was to re-create the physical colonial environment and to facilitate education about the origins of the idea of America, which was conceived during the decades before the American Revolution. In this environment, Colonial Williamsburg strives to tell the story of how diverse peoples, having different and sometimes conflicting ambitions, evolved into a society that valued liberty and equality.

Cliff Fleet, former President of the Jamestown-Yorktown Foundation, was appointed president and CEO of The Colonial Williamsburg Foundation in 2019. Mitchell Reiss, former President of Washington College, was the Foundation's president and CEO from 2014 to 2019. Reiss succeeded Colin G. Campbell, who held the position for 14 years. Thomas F. Farrell II was Chair of the Colonial Williamsburg Foundation's Board of Trustees from 2011 to 2016 and served on the Board from 2006 to 2018.

=== Attendance ===
Attendance at Colonial Williamsburg peaked in 1985 at 1.1 million visitors. After years of lower attendance, it began to rebound somewhat with the Jamestown 2007 celebration and the Revolutionary City programs of live, interactive street theater between reenactors and audience members, which began in 2006.

Since its lowest point in 2004, total attendance has climbed about 10 percent total over the following years, according to a report in July 2008. During 2008, CW's hospitality revenue increase of 15 percent was much stronger than the ticket sale gain of 5 percent, reflecting how the hospitality revenue is not always coming from CW historic area tourists, according to an official.

=== Financial challenges ===
Persistent operating deficits challenge the Colonial Williamsburg Foundation. Income comes from attendance and merchandising, but is lost at hospitality properties. Other funds come from investments of the endowments and a fundraising operation that occupies half of the foundation's four-story headquarters. Financially focused efforts in recent years have primarily concentrated on cost containment and stimulating attendance and hospitality revenues. The foundation has also sold some property assets that were no longer essential to its core mission, including most of its formerly owned properties on nearby Peacock Hill, which has the local distinction of having formerly been home to Georgia O'Keeffe, Mayor Polly Stryker, and Dr. Donald W. Davis, founder of the Virginia Institute of Marine Science.

In 2017, due to losses, Colonial Williamsburg former President Mitchell Reis outsourced management of commercial operations of their hotels, 19 retail stores, and three golf courses.

==== Land divestment ====
In 2003, as CW attendance and operating revenues continued to drop, Carter's Grove was closed to the public while its mission and role in CW's programs were redefined. After the sale, officials belatedly determined Carters Grove was paying for itself, one of the bright spots in its troubled balance sheet. Later in 2003, Hurricane Isabel seriously damaged Carter's Grove Country Road, which had linked the estate to the historic area, a distance of 8 mi (13 km), bypassing commercial and public roadways. Colonial Williamsburg shifted some of the interpretive programs to locations contiguous to the historic area in Williamsburg, including the ersatz farm Great Hopes Plantation next to its Visitor Center.

The foundation announced in late 2006 that Carter's Grove would be sold under restrictive conditions. In a front-page article December 31, The New York Times reported that the foundation, struggling because of dwindling attendance and insufficient endowment for upkeep, would be offering the Carter's Grove mansion and grounds for sale to a private purchaser, possibly as soon as January 2007. The foundation justified the sale, in part, by saying it wanted to concentrate on its 18th-century core—as opposed to such attractions as the reconstruction of a 17th-century village on the site—a position at odds with its later, and subsequently undone, decision to assume management of 17th-century historic Jamestowne. The Times said that the dilemma of historic museums and houses is that there are too many of them, upkeep is too expensive, and fewer people are visiting them.

In December 2007, the Georgian-style mansion and 476 acres (193 ha) were acquired for $15.3 million by CNET founder Halsey Minor, whose announced plans to use the property as a private residence and a center for a Thoroughbred horse breeding program. The conservation easement on the mansion and 400 of the 476 acres (193 ha) is co-held by the Virginia Outdoors Foundation and the Virginia Department of Historic Resources. Some local residents lamented CW's decision to sell Carter's Grove; others stated relief that it would remain largely intact, no small matter in one of the fastest developing counties in Virginia. There was general agreement, however, that the transaction was a disaster for the foundation's management and reputation. In 2011, Halsey Minor stopped making payments, and was foreclosed on by CW after a lengthy legal battle and some deterioration of the house and grounds. In 2014, CW repurchased Carter's Grove from the bankruptcy court, and sold it to a new private investor.

In addition to the large sale of surplus land of the old Kingsmill plantation to Anheuser Busch in the 1970s and the more recent sale of Carter's Grove, the foundation has also sold outlying tracts of land not considered fundamental to its mission, as well as multiple now-privately owned homes in Peacock Hill.

One of these is a 360-acre (150 ha) tract along historic Quarterpath Road north of State Route 199 and south of U.S. Route 60 east of the historic area. In 2005, it was the City of Williamsburg's largest undeveloped tract under single ownership". Observers have noted that, while most of the Quarterpath land will be developed, the previously vacant land will include park and recreational facilities, and Redoubt Park, dedicated to preserving some of the battlegrounds from the Battle of Williamsburg that occurred on May 5, 1862, during the Peninsula Campaign of the American Civil War.

A portion of the 437-acre (177 ha) Carr's Hill Tract in York County, north and west of Bypass Road and State Route 132, was also sold. Developments thereon were restricted under the terms of sale so as to not negatively impact the vista available to motorists approaching Colonial Williamsburg. In February, 2007, a developer announced that 313 homes were planned to be built on 65 acres (26 ha) of the historic tract's 437 acres (177 ha), but these plans were scrapped due to the Great Recession's impact on the greater town economy. CW had earlier announced that it had donated three conservation easements to the Williamsburg Land Conservancy on 230 acres (93 ha) of the Carr's Hill tract land west of Route 132 in York County.

== Transportation ==
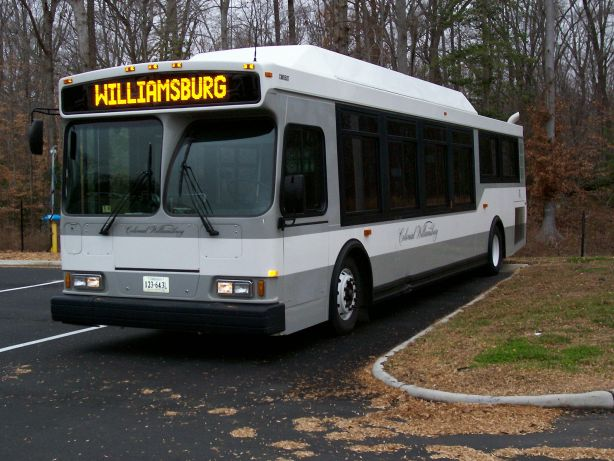
Colonial Williamsburg has its own dedicated bus service to locations around the historic area.

The closest commercial airport is Newport News/Williamsburg International Airport 25–30 minutes driving distance away. Williamsburg is midway between two larger commercial airports, Richmond International Airport and Norfolk International Airport, each about an hour's distance away.

The area has a central intermodal transportation center which includes an Amtrak passenger rail service stop. Greyhound and Carolina Trailways serve the area with intercity buses and Williamsburg Area Transit Authority (WATA), a public transit bus system, operates a network of local routes.

Williamsburg is adjacent to east–west Interstate 64 and the parallel U.S. Route 60 passes through the city. A third road, State Route 143, also extends east to Newport News and Hampton, ending at Fort Monroe. From Richmond, Interstate 295, and other points west, many visitors approach via State Route 5, a scenic byway which passes many of the James River Plantations, or from the south via State Route 10, State Route 31 and the Jamestown Ferry. The Virginia Capital Trail is available for bicycles and pedestrians along the Colonial Parkway and Virginia Route 5.

== Criticism and controversy ==
=== The 1920s and 1930s ===
Some residents of Williamsburg, including Major S. D. Freeman and Cara Armistead, questioned the 1928 transfer of public lands (as compared to private properties). In January 1932, the large marble Confederate Civil War monument was removed from Palace Green, where it had stood since 1908, and placed in the Cedar Grove Cemetery, on the outskirts of town. This was disagreeable to some citizens who supported the colonial reconstruction. The case went to court, and eventually the monument was moved to a new site east of the then-new courthouse. For many years, the memorial rested in Bicentennial Park, just outside the Historic Area. In July 2020 the city council voted unanimously to remove it, and it was returned to the United Daughters of the Confederacy in August 2020.

=== Issues of "accuracy" and "authenticity" ===
The approach to restoration and preservation taken by the Colonial Williamsburg Foundation has long been subject to criticism.

Goodwin was troubled by what he perceived as encroaching commercialization. Among his parting words of advice to Colonial Williamsburg's management were: "If there is one firm guiding and restraining word which should be passed on to those who will be responsible for the restoration in the future, that one word is integrity. A departure from truth here and there will inevitably produce a cumulative deterioration of authenticity and consequent loss of public confidence. Loyalty demands that this principle of integrity be adhered to".

One of the foundation's in-house publications concedes that "Colonial Williamsburg bears the burden of criticism that the restored town appears too neat and clean, too 'spick-and-span', and too manicured to be believable". Ada Louise Huxtable, an architecture critic, wrote in 1965: "Williamsburg is an extraordinary, conscientious and expensive exercise in historical playacting in which real and imitation treasures and modern copies are carelessly confused in everyone's mind. Partly because it is so well done, the end effect has been to devalue authenticity and denigrate the genuine heritage of less picturesque periods to which an era and a people gave life".

All of the restored houses were improved with electricity, plumbing, and heating by 19th- and 20th-century residents and later by Colonial Williamsburg. They have also been furnished with stoves, air conditioners, refrigerators, and bathrooms by today's residents or the foundation. Plaster, woodwork, flooring, siding and roofs were replaced.

In 1997, anthropologists Eric Gable and Richard Handler discussed Colonial Williamsburg as an attraction which catered to America's upper/middle to high-level affluent socioeconomic classes. Their report mentions instances where some of Colonial Williamsburg's employees often straddle expectations of maintaining authenticity of the museum's programs while still in-authentically creating products to sell in the museum's gift shops. A more harsh interpretation is that of University of Virginia Professor of Architectural History Richard Guy Wilson, author of Buildings of Virginia: Tidewater and Piedmont, who described Colonial Williamsburg as "a superb example of an American suburb of the 1930s, with its in-authentically tree-lined streets of Colonial Revival houses and segregated commerce". All of these reproaches have led many critics to label Colonial Williamsburg and its Foundation a "Republican Disneyland".

Among the answers to these criticisms is that "Colonial Williamsburg's Historic Area is a compromise between historical authenticity and common sense, between brutal realism and gentle ambiance, between being a moment in time in the eighteenth century and being nearly three hundred years old". Critics assert that setting "historical authenticity" against "common sense" is a false dichotomy and that commercial and proprietary factors are what are really at issue. Of course archaeological and historical research is an ongoing process at Colonial Williamsburg, and as new information surfaces, reconsideration is often prompted and changes made accordingly.

In March 2016, the foundation's new president and chief executive officer, Mitchell Reiss, told the Richmond Times-Dispatch that Colonial Williamsburg aimed to be "accurate-ish."

=== African Americans ===
Colonial Williamsburg has been criticized for neglecting the role of free Black Americans in colonial life, in addition to those who were slaves. When it first opened in the 1930s, Colonial Williamsburg had segregated dormitories for its reenactors. African Americans filled historical roles as servants, rather than free people as in the present day. In a segregated state, Colonial Williamsburg allowed the entry of Blacks, but Williamsburg-area hotels denied them accommodation, and state law forbade Black people from eating with white people in such public facilities as the restored taverns and from shopping in nearby stores.

Colonial Williamsburg offered some of the earlier public accommodations on an integrated basis. In the 1970s, in reaction to increasing scorn of its one-sided portrayal of colonial life, Colonial Williamsburg increased its number of African American interpreters who played slaves. This was parodied by a sketch that aired on Saturday Night Live, which showed a reenactor abusing his accuracy by being racist to employees. In 1994, it added slave auctions and slave marriages; the NAACP and the Southern Christian Leadership Conference later protested. One controversial example was the "Publick Times" program, a reenactment of a slave auction staged in October 1994. The event was widely publicized by news outlets such as The Baltimore Sun, Chicago Tribune, and The New York Times. While some members of the public applauded the reenactment as a reflection of the reality of slavery in the American colonies, others criticized the program for using a slave auction as a source of entertainment.

In 1981, Colonial Williamsburg added a program to explain slavery and its role in Colonial America, but this "Other Half Tour", which is composed by the Foundation's African American and Interpretation Programs Department (AAIP), provides a different form of historical interpretation than does its counterpart tour, "The Patriots' Tour", thus creating a marked dichotomy between how visitors are expected to interpret history at the museum.

In recent years, Colonial Williamsburg has expanded its portrayal of 18th-century African Americans to include free Blacks as well as slaves. Examples of these expanded portrayals in the Revolutionary City program include Gowan Pamphlet, a former slave who became a free landowner and Baptist minister, Edith Cumbo, a free Black woman, Matthew Ashby, a free Black man who eventually purchased the freedom of his family, and a number of other enslaved men and women who were part of the Williamsburg community during the Revolutionary period. A re-created Great Hopes Plantation represents a middling plantation, not one owned by the wealthy, in which working-class farmers worked alongside their slaves. Their lives were more typical of colonial Virginians in general than the lives of the wealthier planters, their families, and slaves.

== Depictions/references in pop culture ==
- A short film called The Bill of Rights in 1939 depicting the 1st Virginia Convention. Created by Warner Bros. It is currently available on the 2007 DVD release of Allegheny Uprising (1939).
- The Howards of Virginia filmed on location.
- Williamsburg: The Story of a Patriot, an orientation film created for the Visitor Center.
- Felicity: An American Girl Adventure; not filmed in Colonial Williamsburg, but takes places in-story. A special feature on the DVD contains Felicity actress Shailene Woodley and her co-star visiting Colonial Williamsburg.
- Episode 1 of season 3 of Mister T takes place in Colonial Williamsburg.
- KaBlam! season 4 episode 3, "Holdeth the Pickle, Holdeth the Lettuce" takes place in Colonial Williamsburg.
- Several locations were used throughout the miniseries George Washington.
- Certain locations such as the Public Gaol are used in John Adams to represent 18th century locations in Massachusetts.
- In episode 17 of season 1 of Friends, "The One with Two Parts: Part 2", Ross is said to have "always wanted to go to Colonial Williamsburg." When thinking of things to do.

== See also ==
- Abby Aldrich Rockefeller Folk Art Museum
- DeWitt Wallace Decorative Arts Museum
- Norborne Berkeley, 4th Baron Botetourt
- William Parks (publisher)
- St. George Tucker House
- Tayloe House (Williamsburg, Virginia)
- Christiana Burdett Campbell, namesake of Christiana Campbell's Tavern
- List of National Historic Landmarks in Virginia
- National Register of Historic Places in Williamsburg, Virginia
- Plimoth Patuxet
- Westville (Georgia)
- Old Sturbridge Village

== Sources ==
- Chisholm, Hugh, ed. (1911). "Williamsburg" . Encyclopædia Britannica. Vol. 28 (11th ed.). Cambridge University Press. pp. 683–684.Brinkley, Kent; Chappell, Gordon W. (1995). The Gardens of Colonial Williamsburg. The Colonial Williamsburg Foundation. ISBN 978-0879351588.
- "Capitol". The Colonial Williamsburg Foundation. Archived from the original on March 27, 2015.
- Handler, Richard; Gable, Eric (1997). The New History in an Old Museum: Creating the Past at Colonial Williamsburg. Duke University Press. ISBN 0-8223-1974-8.
- Montgomery, Dennis (1998). A Link Among the Days, The Life and Times of the Rev. Dr. W. A. R. Goodwin, the Father of Colonial Williamsburg. Dietz Press. ISBN 0875170943.
