= Geddy House =

House in Williamsburg, Virginia, USA

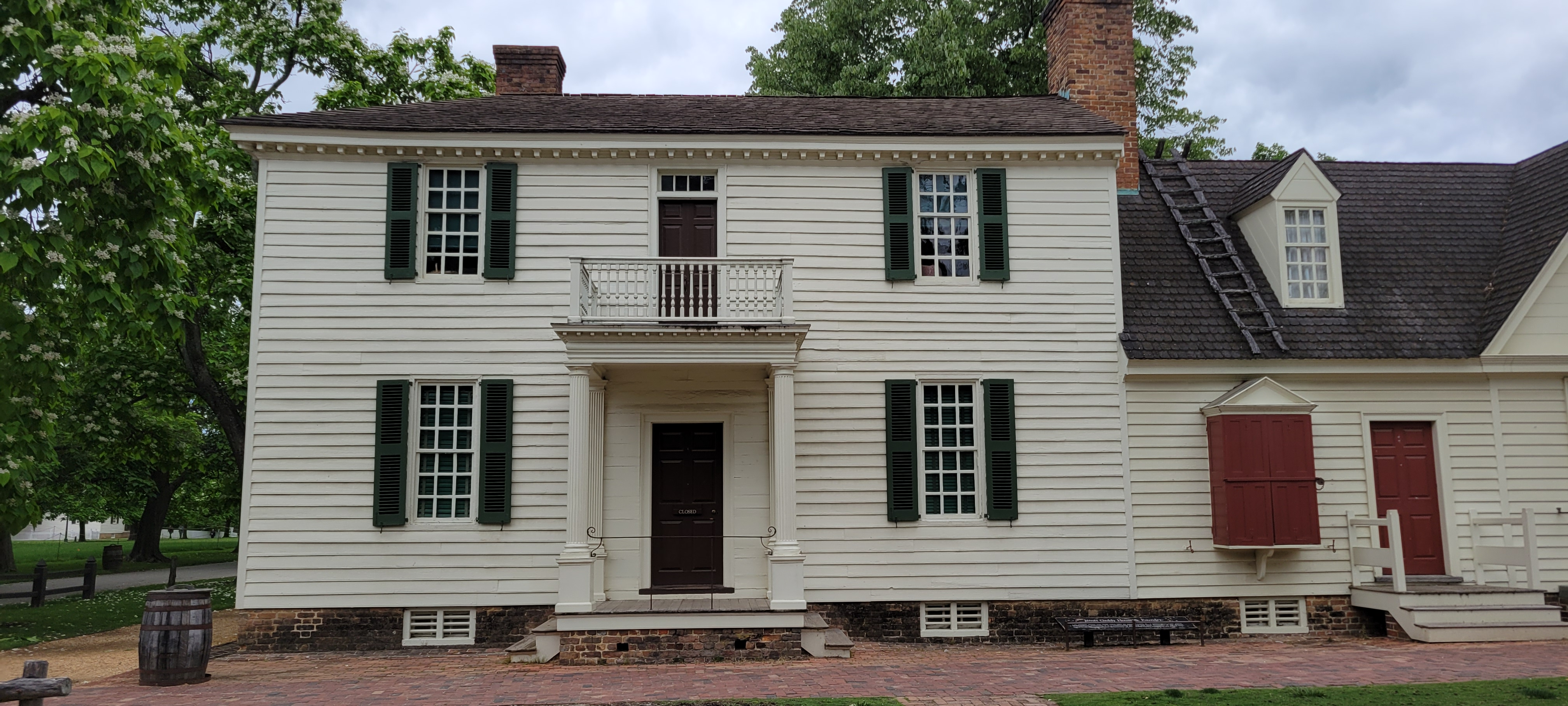
- Interactive map of the Geddy House area
- Alternative names: James Geddy House

General information
- Status: Museum
- Location: Williamsburg, Virginia, United States
- Coordinates: 37°16′17″N 76°42′06″W
- Named for: James Geddy, Jr.
- Construction started: 1762
- Renovated: 1930
- Owner: Colonial Williamsburg

Technical details
- Floor count: Two

Website
- Colonial Williamsburg Geddy House

The Geddy House, also known as the James Geddy House, was built by James Geddy Jr. ca. 1762. One of the oldest houses in Virginia and in Williamsburg, it is located on the Palace Green across from Bruton Parish Church. It is a two-story, central-passage house.

== History ==
James Geddy Jr. was a well-established silversmith in Williamsburg. Advertisements in the late 1760s indicate that Geddy's business sold imported silver and gold items, in addition to fine jewelry and cutlery.

In 1762, Geddy built the house at the corner of Duke of Gloucester Street and Palace Green. In addition to serving as the family home, the structure also housed the various business ventures of the Geddy family utilizing a rear entrance as a retail shop.

During restorations of Colonial Williamsburg in 1930 and 1967, the entrance porch was replaced, and the house's chimneys were rebuilt above the roof ridge. The house retains much of its original woodwork. Further preservation activities were undertaken in 2002.

== Features ==
Many aspects of the house's design are not common in other sites in Williamsburg. The house's low-pitched roof and lack of dormers are unusual features, as are the door and balcony above the front porch. The L-shape may have also been adapted to fit the location.

The details of the home include English architecture and Italian variations of Greek and Roman architecture. Archeological excavations of the shop site of the house have provided information about eighteenth-century clockmaking in British America.

== Gallery ==
Geddy House in Colonial Williamsburg

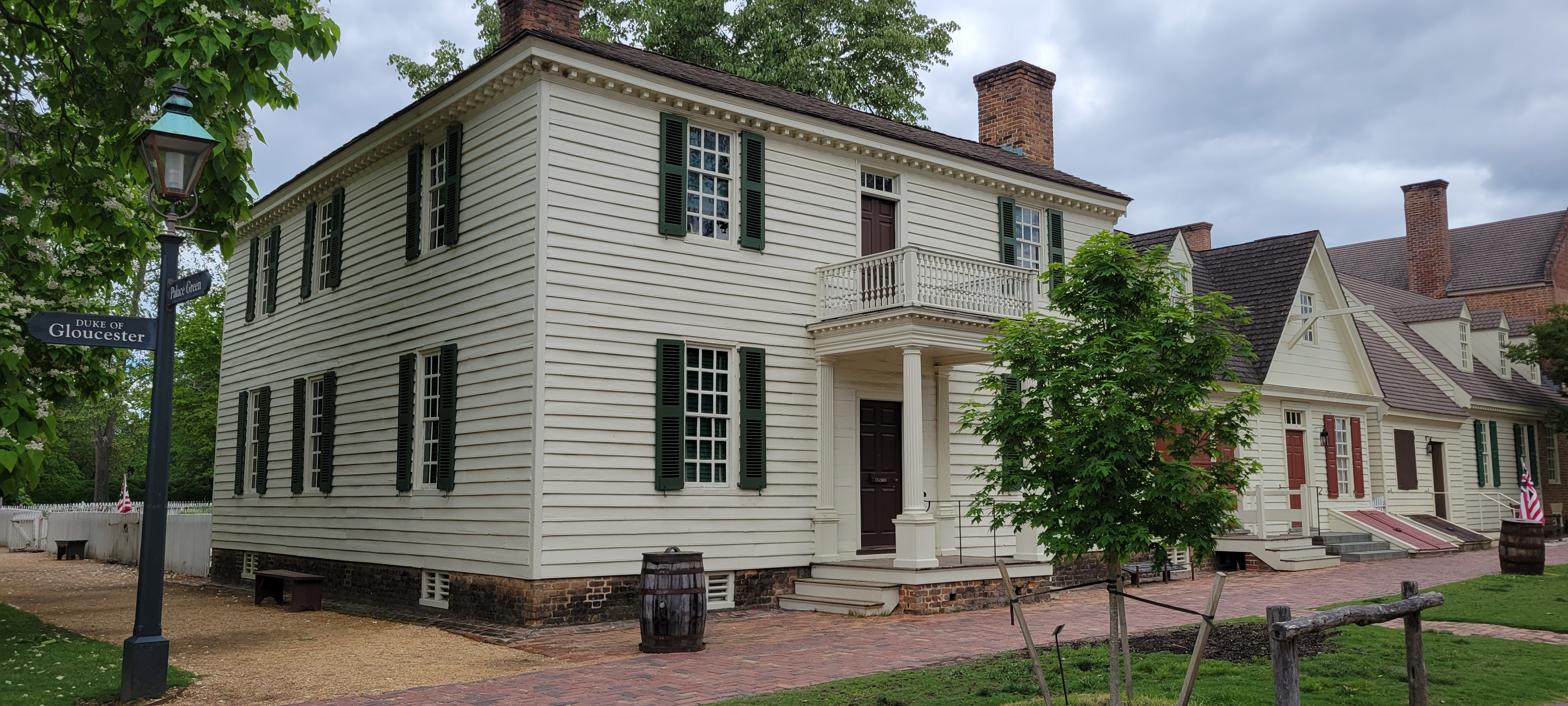
Front view

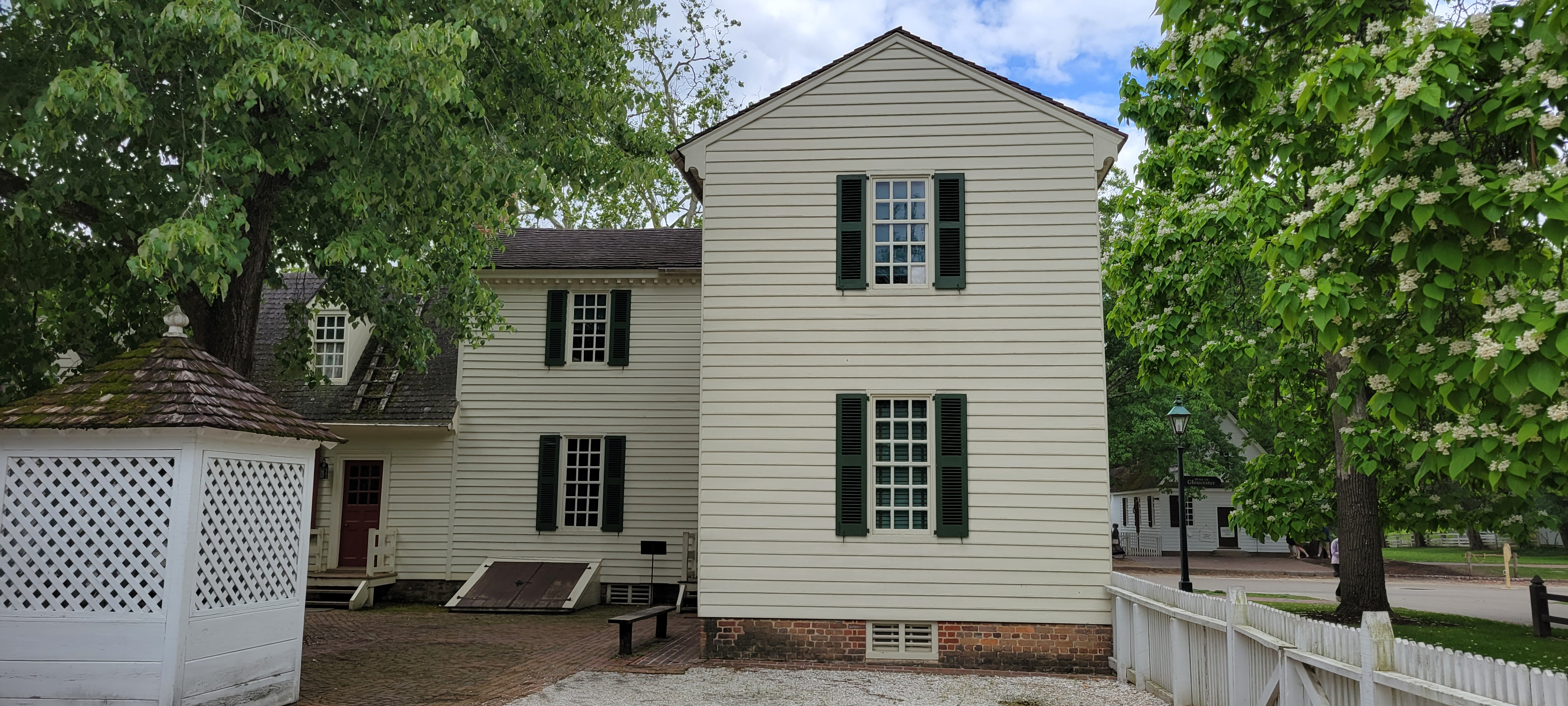
Rear view

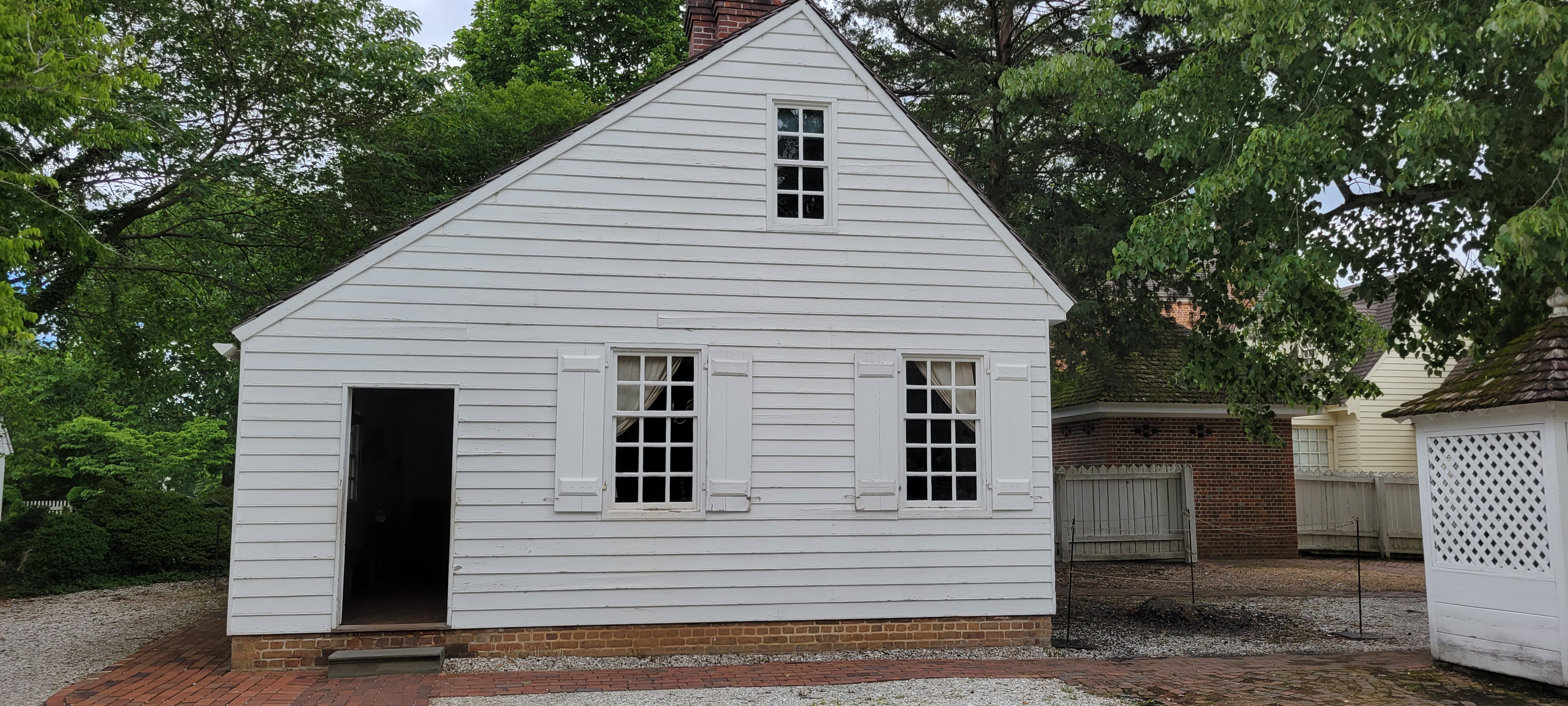
Outbuilding
