= Peacock Hill =

Peacock Hill is a small neighborhood located centrally in Williamsburg, Virginia. It's located immediately adjacent to the restored Historic Area of Colonial Williamsburg, consisting of the four blocks bounded by Lafayette, Prince George, Boundary, and Nassau Streets. The city's police and fire stations, public library, community building, and Stryker Center for the government all border the neighborhood.

== History ==
The name "Peacock Hill" can be traced to the 1800s, when a resident of the small hill near Williamsburg's central Duke of Gloucester Street actually raised peacocks.

Its most famous former resident is artist Georgia O'Keeffe, who lived briefly in a cinder-block house owned by her father on Scotland Street, near the top of Peacock Hill. For a time, Peacock Hill housed the College of William and Mary's Center for Gifted Education, and for nearly a century it has been the home of Matthew Whaley Elementary School.
