= Grand illumination =

Outdoor light ceremony

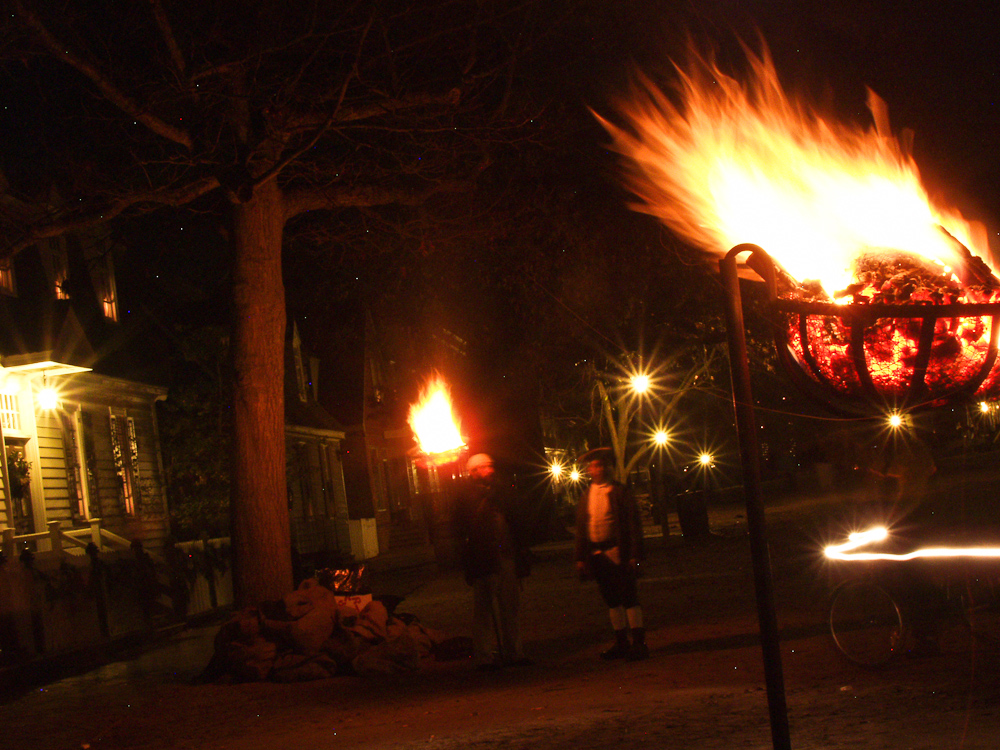
In the tradition of a "grand illumination", fires are used to light the street in Colonial Williamsburg.

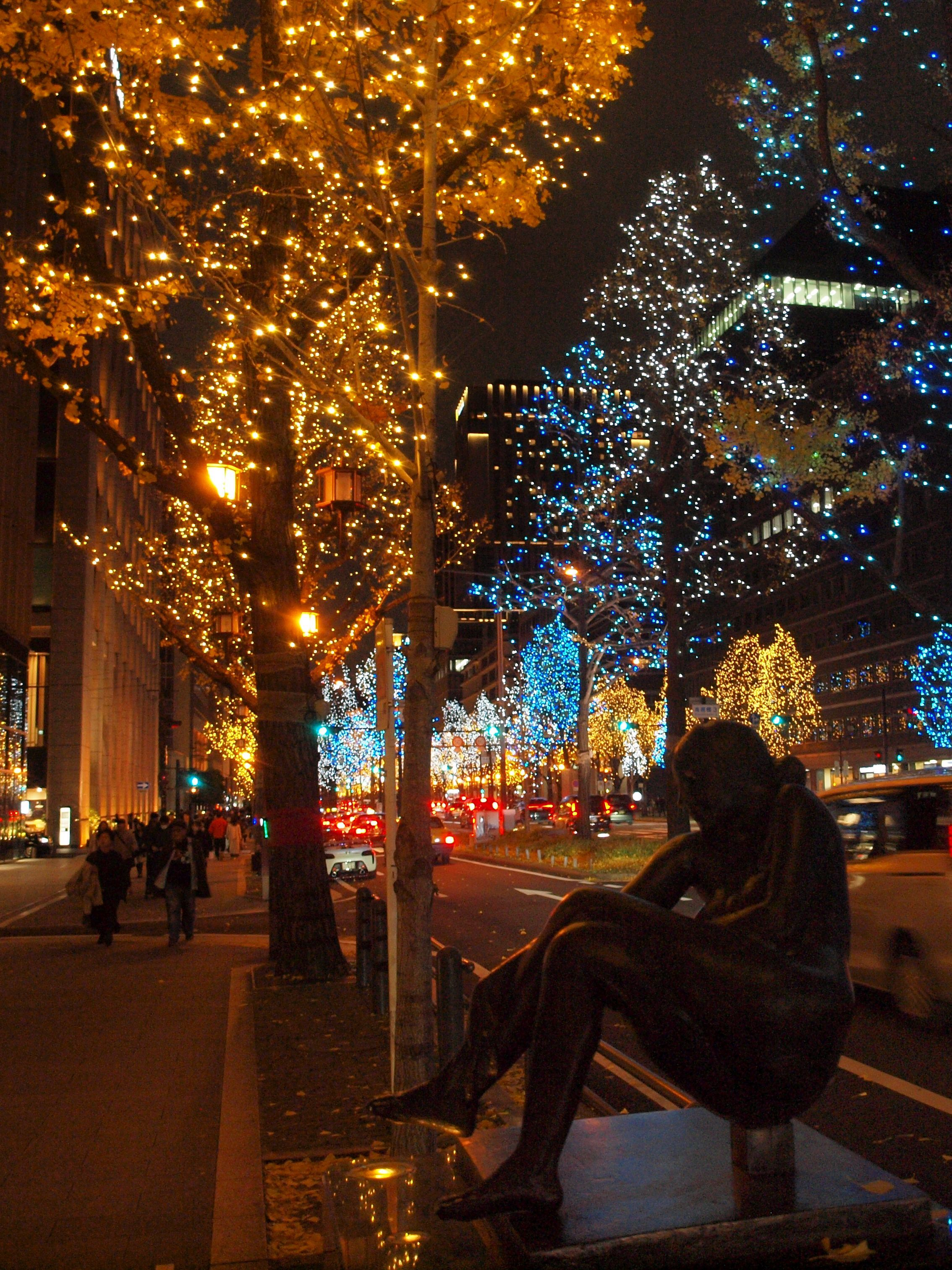
The Midosuji illumination is a grand illumination event that drapes Osaka’s Midōsuji in gentle lights.

A grand illumination is an outdoor ceremony involving the simultaneous activation of lights. The most common form of the ceremony involves turning on Christmas lights.

One of the older of such community events began at Colonial Williamsburg, the restored Historic District of the former Virginia capital city of Williamsburg in 1935. It is held there each year on the Sunday of the first full weekend in December. (That is, if December begins on a Sunday, the event is held the following Sunday.) Williamsburg's Grand Illumination, which also involves fireworks, is based loosely on the colonial (and English) tradition of placing lighted candles in the windows of homes and public buildings to celebrate a special event. The winning of a war and the birthday of the reigning monarch are examples of such national events. Many candles appeared in darkened windows in New York after the September 11, 2001 attacks.

In recent times, in many cities much larger than Williamsburg, such as Richmond, Virginia, multiple skyscrapers and other buildings are decorated with long mostly vertical strings of lights of a common theme, and are activated simultaneously in "Grand Illumination" ceremonies. Some communities, such as Norfolk, Virginia and Asheville, North Carolina, have Grand Illumination parades. In Chattanooga, Tennessee, a similar event is called the "Grand Illumination On The River." In Oak Bluffs, Massachusetts, on Martha's Vineyard, Grand Illumination is one of the most significant events each summer, immediately preceded by a Community Sing. In the United Kingdom, the "Grand Illumination" ceremony is generally referred to as "Turning On The Lights", and occurs in virtually all towns and cities throughout the country.

== See also ==
- Christmas tree
- Fourth of July
- Holiday Trail of Lights
- Colonial Williamsburg

== External links and sources ==
- The 'Grand Illumination' in Williamsburg's Historic District many photos
- Norfolk's Grand Illumination Parade
- Grand Illumination On The River, Chattanooga, Tennessee
- Grand Illumination at the Campground in Oak Bluffs, Massachusetts
