= Albert Hofman =

Albert Hofman may refer to:

- Albert Hofman (epidemiologist), Dutch clinical epidemiologist
- Albert Hofman (footballer), Romanian footballer

== See also ==
- Albert Hofmann (1906–2008), Swiss scientist and discoverer of LSD-25
- Albert Hoffman (disambiguation)
