= Edith Cumbo =

American 18th-century free Black woman and entrepreneur

Edith Cumbo (c. 1735 – ?) was a free mixed-race Black woman and entrepreneur who lived in Williamsburg, Virginia. Her life story is taught in the Advanced Placement American history curriculum to illustrate the challenges that free African Americans faced during the period of the American Revolution.

== Early life and family ==
Edith Cumbo was born in around 1735 in Charles City County, Virginia. Because her parents were free, she inherited their legal status upon her birth. Her mother, Francine Cumbo, was an Irish indentured servant. Edith's father, Richard Cumbo, a free black man, fought in the French and Indian War, and was granted 50 acres of land in Williamsburg in recognition of his service.

By the mid-1750s, Cumbo was living in Halifax County, Virginia. In the 1760s, she gave birth to a son, Daniel. Because she was unmarried, Edith was accused of having a child out of wedlock. However, she was found not guilty of this charge by the presiding judges "for reasons appearing to the court." Local tradition and oral history holds that her father was reportedly a prominent and powerful figure in Williamsburg.

== Later life ==
By the late 1770s during the American Revolution, Cumbo resided in Williamsburg as one of the only free blacks in the city. After her father's death, Edith inherited his 50-acre farm in Williamsburg.

Records indicate that Cumbo was her head of household and supported herself financially through a laundry business and the farm which she inherited from her father, where she grew corn, barley, wheat, and tobacco. Cumbo never married, likely due to 18th century laws at the time which transferred all property and assets of women to their husbands when they married.

In 1778, Cumbo sued Adam White, a Caucasian man, for trespass, battery, and assault. This legal action was largely unprecedented for the period, as was its outcome; the York County court found in Cumbo's favor and awarded her one shilling in compensatory damages.

During the Revolutionary War, Edith's son Daniel served as one of the troops alongside General George Washington at Valley Forge.

== Legacy ==
Colonial Williamsburg tells the stories of 18th-century African Americans including interpreters in programs portraying Edith Cumbo, whom they also have formally named as a "Nation Builder". She is also featured in the organization's "Her Enduring Spirit" tour series.

Cumbo's life story is included in the curriculum of American elementary, middle, and high school courses and units, including AP U.S. History, regarding the History of America and Virginia History.
