= Abby Aldrich Rockefeller Folk Art Museum =

Museum in Williamsburg, Virginia, US

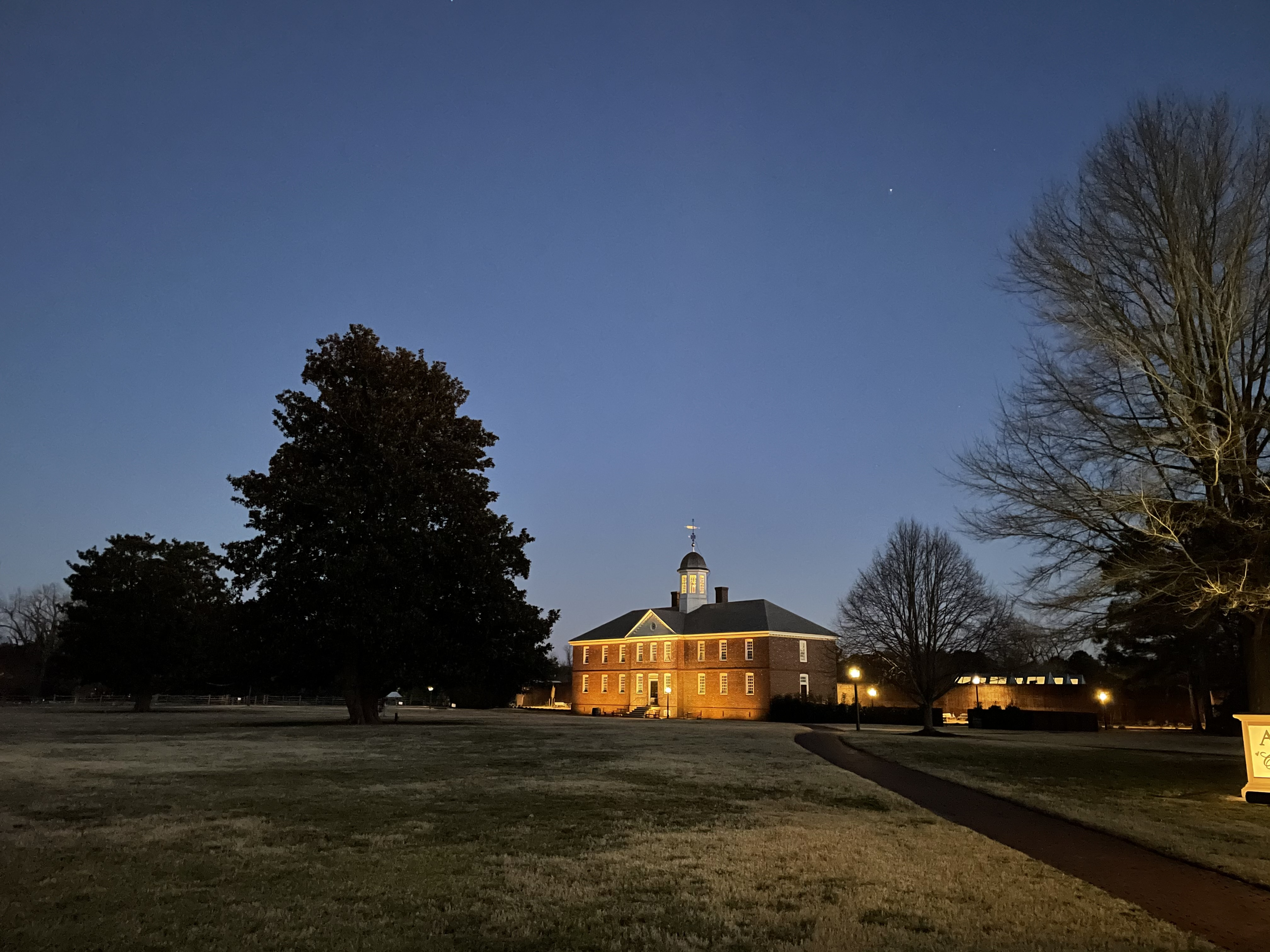
- Exterior of museum, 2020
- Established: 1957
- Location: Williamsburg, Virginia
- Coordinates: 37.2686°N 76.7048°W
- Website: www.colonialwilliamsburg.org/locations/abby-aldrich-rockefeller-folk-art-museum/

The Abby Aldrich Rockefeller Folk Art Museum (AARFAM) is the United States' first and the world's oldest continually operated museum dedicated to the preservation, collection, and exhibition of American folk art. Located just outside the historic boundary of Colonial Williamsburg, Virginia, AARFAM was founded with a collection donated by Abby Aldrich Rockefeller and an endowment from her widower, John D. Rockefeller Jr., heir to the Standard Oil fortune and co-founder of Colonial Williamsburg.

With her seminal collection, Abby Rockefeller "elevated a body of material that had long been dismissed as homespun craft to a nationally-recognized and highly-regarded form of American art." The original building opened in May 1957, with Mitchell Wilder as Director, and was expanded in 1992 before being moved and expanded again in 2007, each time to accommodate its growing collection. Abby Rockefeller's collection of 424 pieces became the basis of a collection that now includes more than 7,000 folk art pieces dating from the 1720s to the present. A further expansion at its current location is projected to open in 2019.

Having opened originally as the Abby Aldrich Rockefeller Folk Art Collection (AARFAC), the facility changed names in 1977 to the Abby Aldrich Rockefeller Folk Art Center (AARFAC) and again in 2000 to Abby Aldrich Rockefeller Folk Art Museum. Now co-located with the DeWitt Wallace Decorative Arts Museum, both collections retain their respective names — and are together known as the Art Museums of Colonial Williamsburg.

== History ==
After collecting a formative group of American folk art pieces under the advisement of consultants and art dealers, art patron Abby Aldrich Rockefeller anonymously loaned part of her folk art collection to the Museum of Modern Art exhibition American Folk Art: The Art of the Common Man in America, 1750–1900 which ran from November 30, 1932, through January 14, 1933 in New York. The exhibition would later tour six US cities, and in 2017, Antiques Magazine wrote that "whether or not there was unanimous agreement on the importance of folk art in that story, the category could no longer be ignored."

In 1935 Rockefeller loaned part of her folk art collection to the Ludwell–Paradise House in Williamsburg. Four years later, she donated the collection to Colonial Williamsburg, where it remained in the Ludwell-Paradise House until 1956.

In 1956, after the 1948 death of Abby Aldrich Rockefeller and two years after her husband announced he would endow a Williamsburg museum bearing the Rockefeller name, their son David Rockefeller augmented the collection at the Ludwell-Paradise House with another 54 folk art objects his mother had donated to the Metropolitan Museum of Art and the Museum of Modern Art. The collection remained open to the public at the Ludwell Paradise House until January 1, 1956."

In conceiving a new location for the collection, the Rockefellers had worked with pioneer collector in the field of American decorative arts and folk art, Nina Fletcher Little who in the early 1950s suggested "the ceilings be lowered and the interior become a series of domestic-scaled spaces. She did the first research on the collection, made attributions of paintings, and wrote the first catalogue of the collection."

The Abby Aldrich Rockefeller Folk Art Collection opened in May 1957 in a new two-story, purpose-built Georgian/Federal Revival brick building with a prominent oval garden — located just outside the historic district of Colonial Williamsburg at South England Street, adjacent to the Williamsburg Inn. At this time (1957), the Ludwell-Paradise House, despite being the original real estate purchase by John Rockefeller to create Colonial Williamsburg, became a private residence."

In 1992, the museum inaugurated a 19,000-square-foot single-story brick addition featuring a prominent planted wood and brick pergola and an adjoining fountain garden, designed by architects Roche-Dinkeloo.

In 2007, the AARFAM left the South English Street building and co-located the growing folk art collection with the nearby DeWitt Wallace Decorative Arts Museum — on Francis St. between Nassau and South Henry Streets, near Merchants Square. There, the collection occupied an expansion of 10,400 square feet of exhibition space with 11 galleries, entered via a notably circuitous arrival sequence beneath Colonial Williamsburg's adjacent Public Hospital of 1773 building. With the AARFAM's relocation, the original building (with its oval garden) and the 1992 addition (with its fountain garden) became associated with the Spa of Colonial Williamsburg.

The Colonial Williamsburg Foundation announced in 2014 a $40 million addition to the Dewitt Wallace/Abby Aldrich structure to break ground in April 2017 and open in 2019 — to include a new 65,000sf wing and to feature a new more accessible, street-level entrance on Nassau Street.

== Collection ==
The 424 objects, collected by Abby Rockefeller between 1929 and 1942 remain the core of the collection, however the museum has grown into containing more than 3,000 objects today.

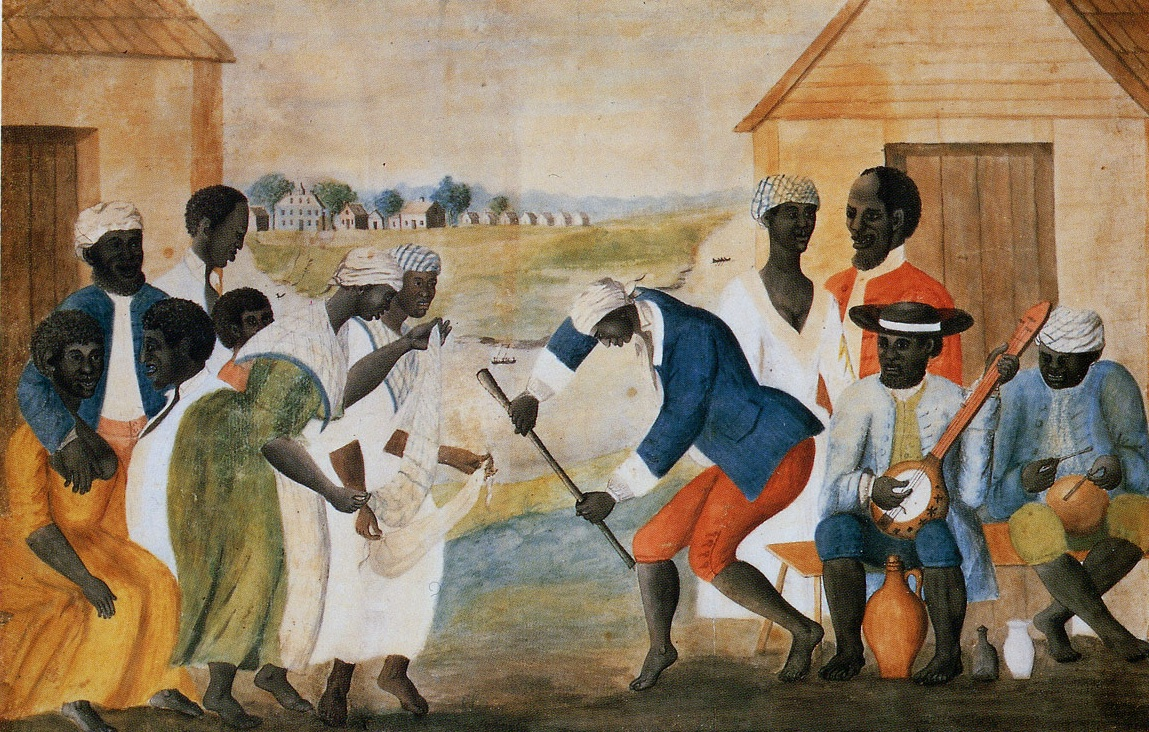
The Old Plantation, ca. 1785–95, watercolor by slave-holder John Rose.

The first year after its opening the museum came to include, besides Rockefeller's collection, works assembled by J. Stuart Halladay and Herrell Thomas, Holger Cahill, Edith Gregor Halpert, and John Law Robertson. Now the museum contains works of portraiture, Southern and African American folk art, sculpture, fraktur, and textiles. It includes representative works of well renowned artists, such as Eddie Arning, Wilhelm Schimmel, Erastus Salisbury Field, Edward Hicks, Lewis Miller, Albert Hoffman, Louis Joseph Bahin and Ammi Phillips. Various exhibitions of the museum regarded 18th and 19th-century painters such as Zedekiah Belknapp, James Sanforth Elsworth, and Asabel Lynde Powers.

The museum includes notable 18th-century watercolor paintings such as The Old Plantation, by South Carolina slave owner John Rose.

One of the notable curators of the museum has been Thomas N. Armstrong III.
