= Albert Hoffman (artist) =

American painter

Albert Hoffman (1915–1993) was an American painter and wood carver. Never progressing beyond a sixth-grade education, Hoffman earned his living operating a junkyard in Galloway Township, New Jersey, near Atlantic City. A self-taught artist, he found inspiration in narratives from the Torah and Nevi'im; over his lifetime he produced over 250 carvings whose subjects were drawn from the Bible or from his Jewish background. His works are also a mirror of his personal interests: whaling, horse racing, and Native Americans all found places in his paintings.

He produced three different types of carvings, bas reliefs, columnar reliefs, and compositional groups. His art is considered outsider art.

Though he sold some of his works and also did some carving for local synagogues, he created most of his art for himself. Nonetheless, he exhibited his work locally, where it won top prizes. His work has been shown across the eastern United States and a number of American museums hold public collections, including the American Folk Art Museum, the Abby Aldrich Rockefeller Folk Art Museum, and the Noyes Museum of Art.
