= Matthew Ashby =

American former slave

Matthew Ashby was born in York County, Virginia, in about 1727. He is a notable and rare example of the successful escape from slavery and indentured servitude. The son of an enslaved Black person and a white indentured servant, he was born free under Virginia law, which at the time gave children the legal status of their mothers. Ashby worked around the Williamsburg area as a carter and carpenter. He was also known to deliver messages for the state, working for Governor Botetourt. Although he was indentured by law until the age of 31, he managed to acquire many things well out of the realm of the average enslaved person or servant, including a silver watch, candle-making supplies, tea boards, and books.

Matthew married Ann, a woman enslaved by the bricklayer, Samuel Spurr. They had two children, John and Mary, who attended the Bray school affiliated with the College of William and Mary. Ms. Anne Wager taught the children the Church of England catechism as well as other subjects. Matthew used his free status to buy his children and wife from Spurr at the cost of £150.

Despite owning his children and wife, Ashby still had to petition the government for their freedom. Standing before the council, Ashby proclaimed that his wife had been faithful and diligent in all her wifely duties and that his children deserved their freedom. The council deliberated and found that they agreed with his proposal, and his family was granted their freedom in 1769. Two years later, Ashby died of a heart disease, leaving his family alone; however, he had successfully freed them from slavery and amassed a sizable estate with monetary value well above the average indentured servant or enslaved person.
