= Andrew Hopewell Hepburn =

American architect (1880–1967)

- Born: March 6, 1880; Catasauqua, Pennsylvania, US
- Died: February 28, 1967 (aged 86); Concord, Massachusetts, US
- Education: Massachusetts Institute of Technology
- Occupation: Architect
- Practice: Perry, Shaw & Hepburn
- Buildings: Governor's Palace; Williamsburg Inn
- Projects: Colonial Williamsburg; Merchants Square

Andrew Hopwell Hepburn (March 6, 1880 – February 28, 1967) was an American architect and professor. Hepburn was a founding partner of Perry, Shaw & Hepburn, now Perry Dean Rogers Architects in Boston, Massachusetts. He is best known for designing buildings and developing the master plan to restore Colonial Williamsburg in Williamburg, Virginia. Several of his projects are listed on the National Register of Historic Places.

== Early life ==
Hepburn was born on March 6, 1880, in Catasauqua, Pennsylvania. His parents were Elizabeth (née Hunt) and Robert Hopewell Hepburn. His maternal great-grandfather was David Thomas, a coal baron and iron industrialist. He attended the West Nottingham Academy in Colora, Maryland, from 1891 to 1899. He then graduated from the Freehold Institute in Freehold, New Jersey.

After failing to gain admitance to the United States Naval Academy, Hepburn enrolled in the Massachusetts Institute of Technology, graduating in 1904 with a B.S. in architecture. While at MIT, he was a member of St. Anthony Hall (Delta Psi). He also participated in theatrical performances with the Walker Club.

== Career ==
After college, Hepburn worked as a draftsman for Harry Morse in Philadelphia, Pennsylvania. In 1907, he started an architectural firm, Taylor and Hepburn in Norfolk, Virginia, with Robert E. Lee Taylor. Taylor was a classmate at MIT who was from Norfolk and also work for Morse. Hepburn and Taylor collaborated on the Auslow Gallery Building and hospital in Ghent. However, the expected building boom in Norfolk did not happen.

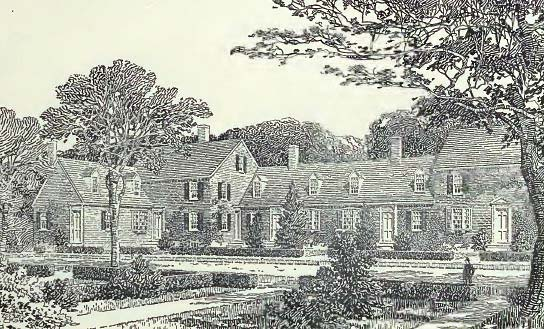
Engraving of Seaside Village from 1919

Hepburn moved to New York City, where he worked for Herbert Hale. He then worked for Henry F. Bigelow in Boston, Massachusetts. He worked for Guy Lowell from 1908 until 1914. Hepburn worked for the U.S. Housing Administration during World War I, working on the Seaside Village housing community in Bridgeport, Connecticut. While at Seaside Village, he worked with landscape architect Arthur Asahel Shurcliff. After the war, Hepburn designed inexpensive prefabricated homes for workers with Albert Farwell Bemis.

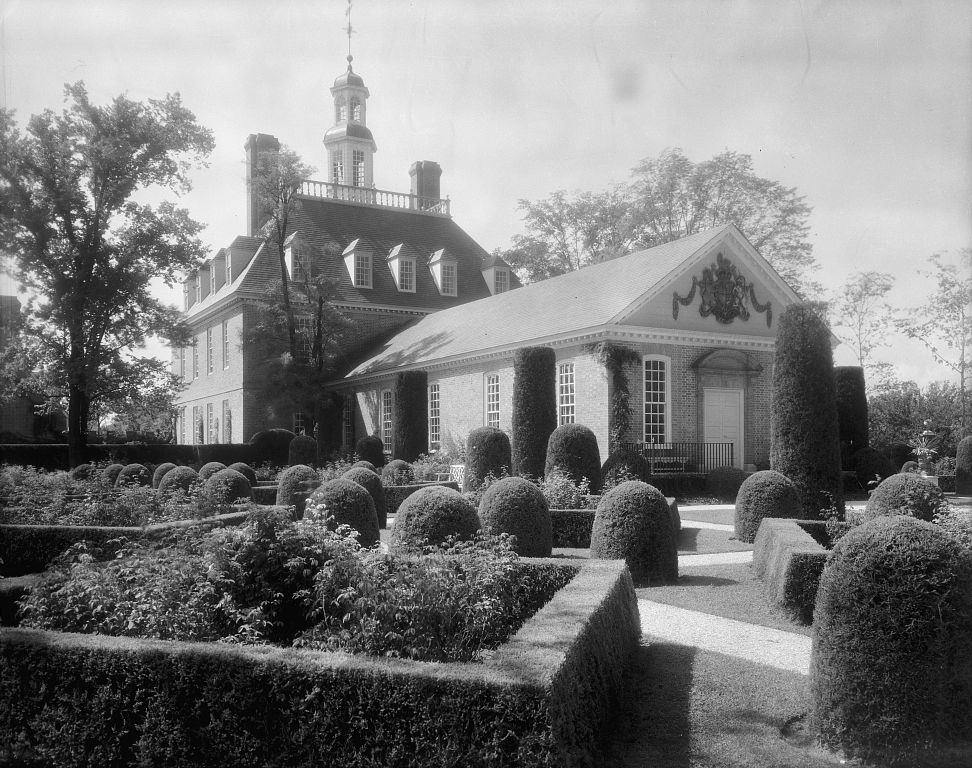
View of the Governor's Palace and gardens shortly after its reconstruction

In 1919, Hepburn formed the architectural firm Shaw and Hepburn in Boston with Thomas Mott Shaw. In 1921, William G. Perry joined the firm, creating Perry, Shaw & Hepburn, which survives today as Perry Dean Rogers Architects. The firm specialized in colonial architecture. They designed buildings for Brown University, Buifinch Hall for the Phillips Academy, the Jordan Marsh Department Store in Boston, and St. Stephen's Church in the South End of Boston, and Wellesley High School in Wellesley, Massachusetts. They also oversaw the restoration of New Castle, Delaware's colonial section.

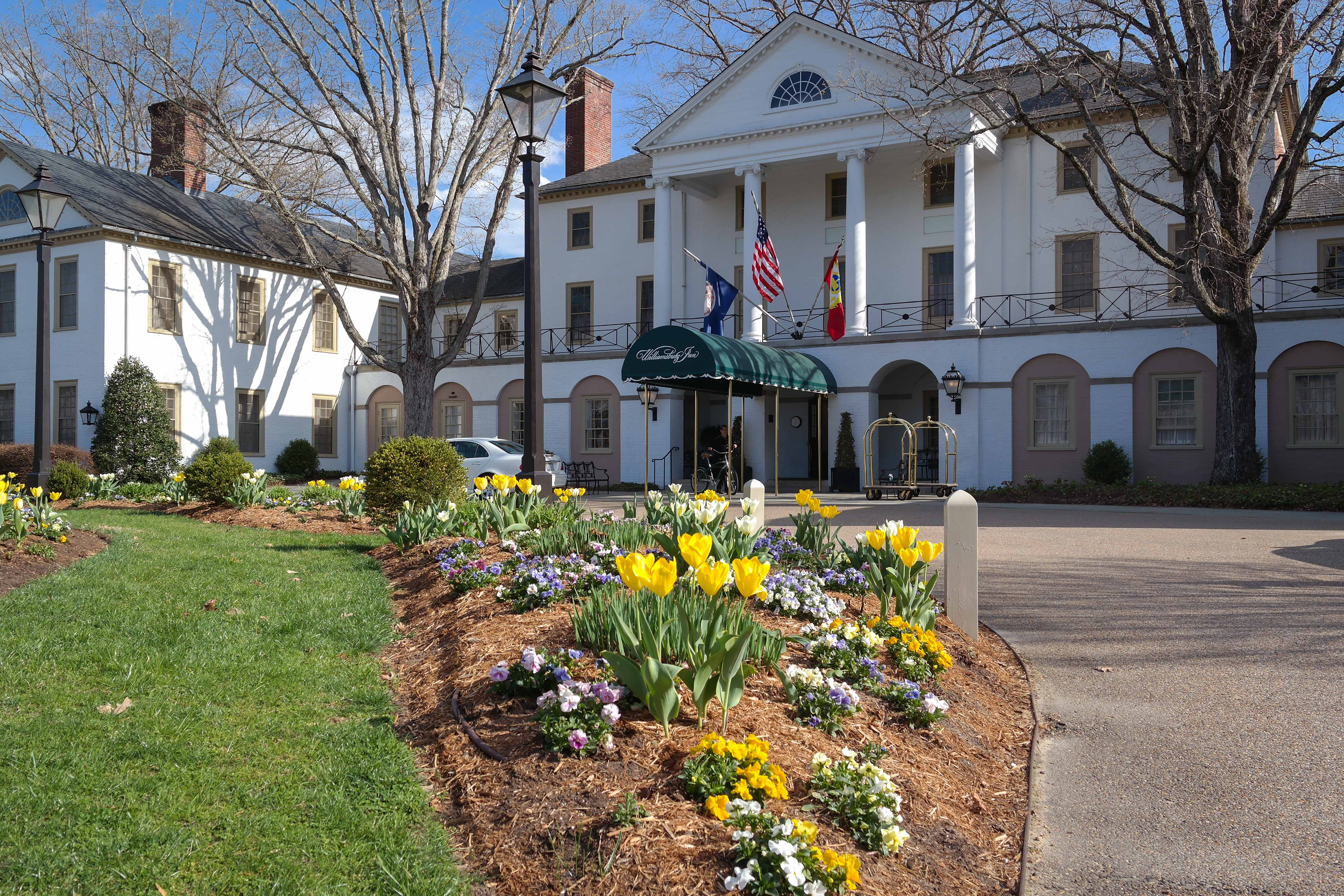
Williamsburg Inn

In 1927, John D. Rockefeller Jr. and W. A. R. Goodwin hired Perry, Shaw & Hepburn to oversee the restoration of Colonial Williamsburg in Williamsburng, Virginia. Although Perry led the project, Hepburn created the first restoration concept drawings for W. A. R. Goodwin and Lyon Gardiner Tyler. Hepburn then lead the effort to create a master plan for Colonial Williamsburg. Shurcliff joined Heburn on the Colonial Williamsburg project.

Between 1927 and 1948, Hepburn created many concept drawings that were used by the architectural team to restore Williamsburg. He worked on the reconstruction of Governor's Palace, the St. George Tucker House, the design of the Williamsburg Inn, and the plan for the Business Block (Merchants Square). During 1937 and 1938, Hepburn regularly visited Williamsburg to oversee construction.

In 1942, Hepburn oversaw the reconstruction of Nathaniel Hawthorne's former home, the Little Red Schoolhouse in Tanglewood, Massaschustts, for the National Federation of Music Clubs. Hepburn provided his services for the project pro bono.

Hepburn was the consulting architect to the United States Department of the Interior Subsistence Homelands Division. He was the director of Small House Architects Associates of Boston. He also taught at the Harvard Architectural School.

Hepburn was a fellow in the American Institute of Architects.

== Personal life ==
Hepburn married Beatrice Outram Sturgis of Boston on January 22, 1907, in the Emmanuel Church in Boston She died on June 16, 1921. The couple had two sons, Robert Hopewell Hepburn and Russell Sturgis Hepburn, who both attended Harvard University. Russell committed suicide in March 1934.

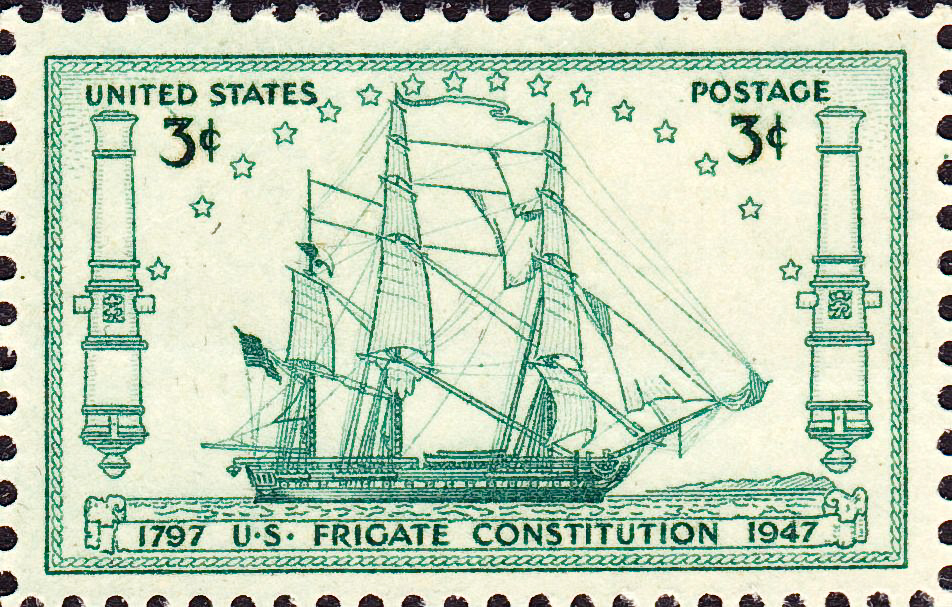
USS Constitution 150 anniversary stamp

Hepburn married Rosamond "Dixey" Sturgis Brooks in Reno, Nevada on July 15, 1941, one day after her divorce to Gorham Brooks. She was a philanthropist who donated her family estate, Tanglewood, to the Boston Symphony Orchestra. She died on June 1, 1948.

Hepburn married Rosamund Borland (Mrs. Peter Desmond White) on September 15, 1950, at the Trinity Episcopal Church in Concord, Massachusetts.

Hepburn was a watercolor artist and made etchings that were exhibited in Boston. He also designed the 1947 USS Constitution commemorative stamp for the United States Postal Service. He was a member of the Marine Association of Salem, Massachusetts and the Marine Historical Association of Mystic, Connecticut.

Hepburn died at his home on Lexington Road in Concord, Massachusetts, on February 28, 1967, at the age of 87 years. His funeral was held in Trinity Episcopal Church in Concord.

== Selected projects ==
- Auslow Gallery Building
- Buifinch Hall for the Phillips Academy, Andover, Massachusetts
- Colonial Williamsburg restoration, Williamsburg, Virginia
- Governor's Palace, Williamsburng, Virginia (U.S. National Historic Landmark District Contributing Property)
- Jonathan Hildreth House (restoration), Concord, Massachusetts (U.S. National Register of Historic Places)
- Jordan Marsh Department Store in Boston, Massachusetts
- Little Red Schoolhouse or theNathanial Hawthorne House (reconstruction), Tanglewood, Massachusetts
- Merchants Square, Williamsburg, Virginia (U.S. National Register of Historic Places)
- Pink Palace Playhouse and Movie Theater, Bemis, Tennessee
- St. George Tucker House, Williamsburg, Virginia (U.S. National Historic Landmark District Contributing Property)
- St. Stephen's Church in the South End, Boston, Massachusetts
- Seaside Village, Bridgeport, Connecticut.(U.S. National Register of Historic Places)
- Washington Insurance Co., Providence, Rhode Island
- Wellesley High School in Wellesley, Massachusetts
- Williamsburg Inn, Williamsburg, Virginia (U.S. National Register of Historic Places)

== See also ==
- Perry Dean Rogers Architects
