= Andrew Hepburn =

Andrew Hepburn may refer to:

- Andrew Dousa Hepburn (1830–1921), Presbyterian pastor, professor and university president
- Andrew Hopewell Hepburn (1880–1967), American architect and professor
- Andrew Hepburne-Scott, 11th Lord Polwarth, Scottish peer
