= Shirley Hall =

Historic house in Virginia, United States

- U.S. National Register of Historic Places
- Virginia Landmarks Register
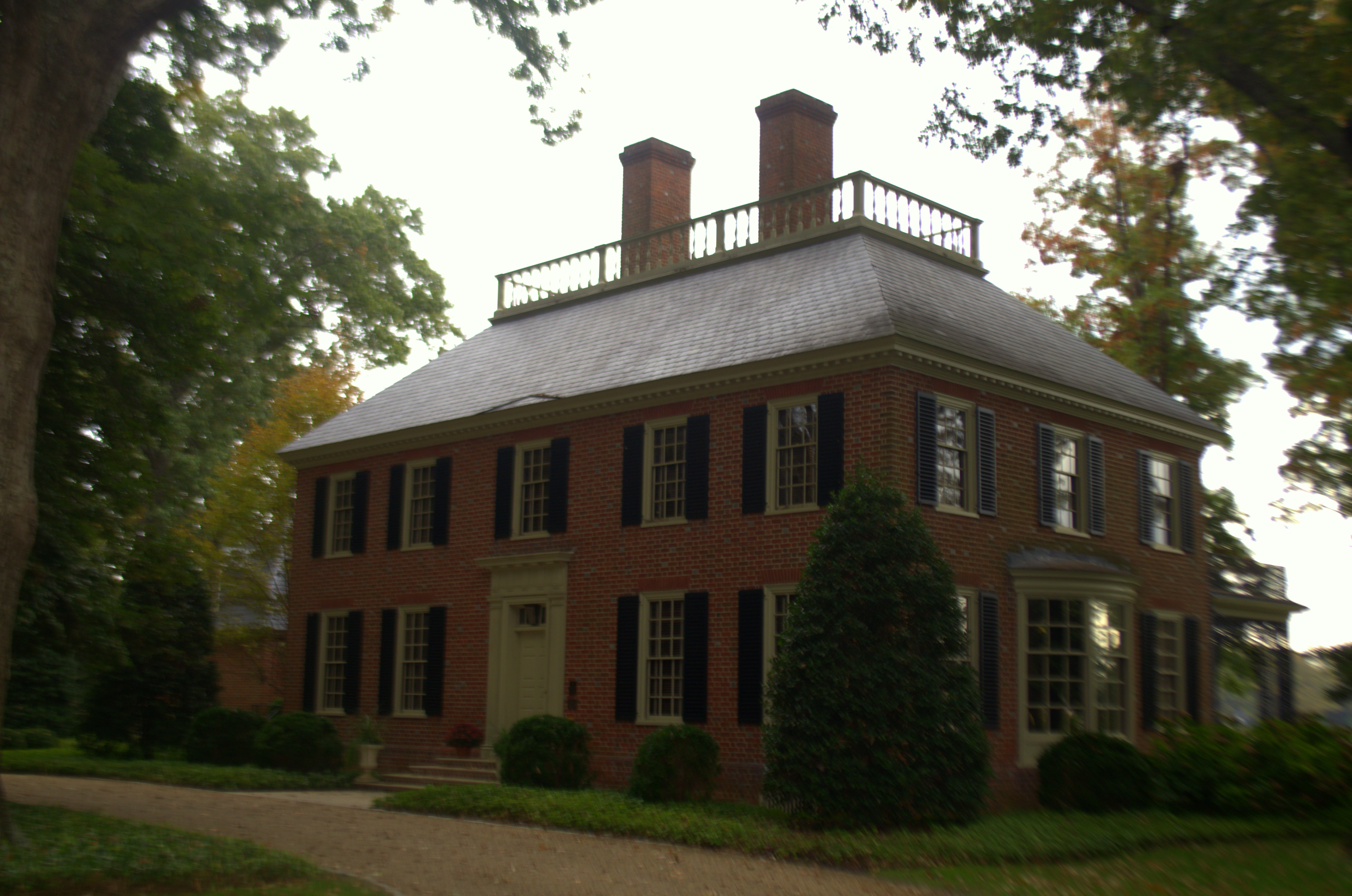
- Shirley Hall

- Location within Virginia Location within the United States
- Location: 1109 S. Bay Shore Dr., Virginia Beach, Virginia
- Coordinates: 36°52′24″N 76°0′28″W
- Area: 4.5 acres (1.8 ha)
- Built: 1940
- Architect: William G. Perry; Perry, Shaw & Hepburn
- Architectural style: Late 19th And 20th Century Revivals
- NRHP reference No.: 99000144
- VLR No.: 134-5002

Significant dates
- Added to NRHP: February 5, 1999
- Designated VLR: December 10, 1998

Shirley Hall, also known as Devereaux House, is a historic home located at Virginia Beach, Virginia. It was built in 1940, and is a two-story, five-bay, Georgian Revival-style brick dwelling. The main block is covered by a hipped roof with balustrade. A gambrel roofed service wing connects the main block to a hipped roofed garage. The interior features an entrance hall with an original Virginia staircase, removed from the Hunter House in Princess Anne County (c. 1826). The house is set in a park like setting among mature hardwood trees and American hollies.

It was added to the National Register of Historic Places in 1999.
