= William G. Perry (architect) =

American architect (1883–1975)

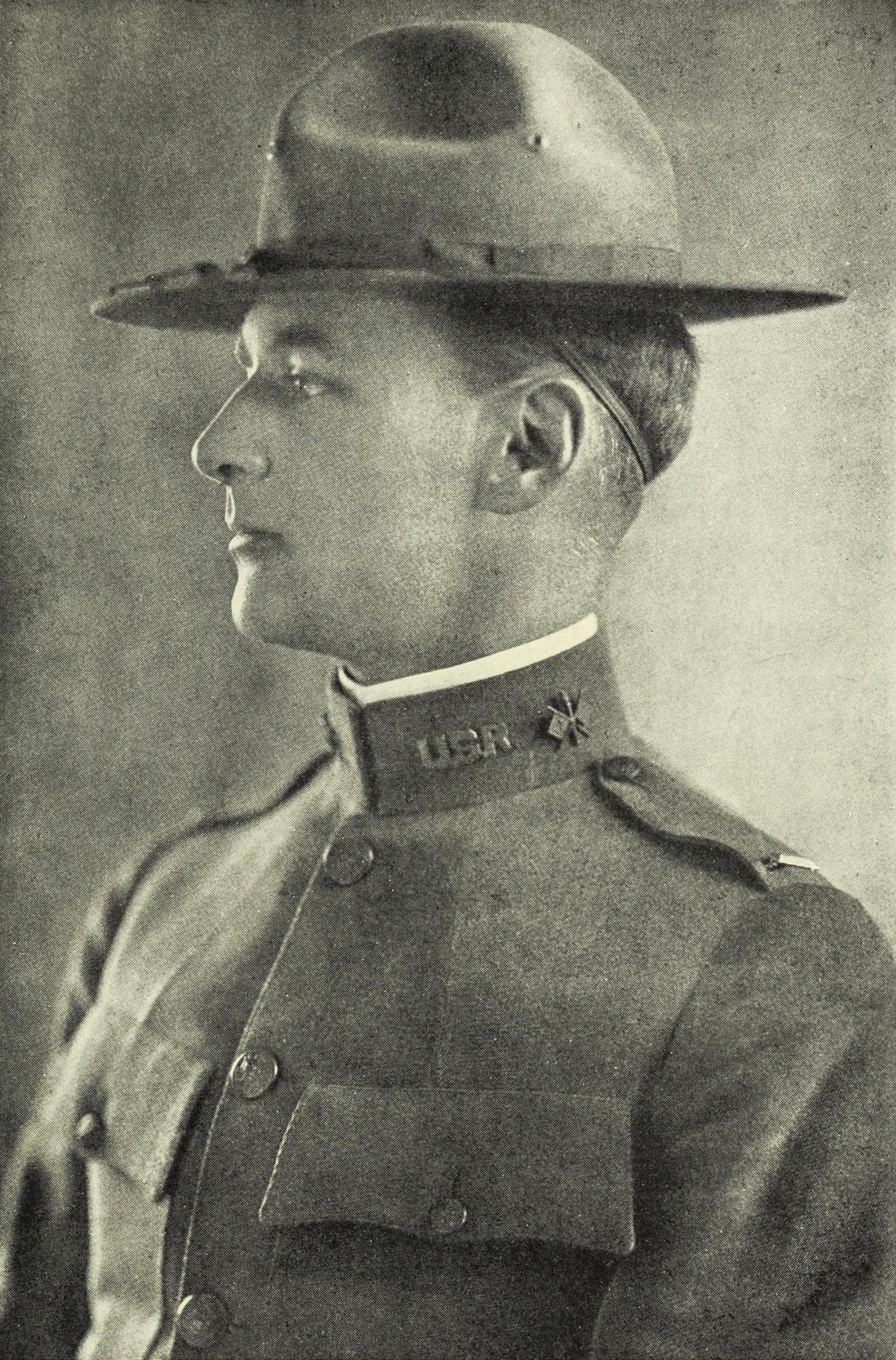
- William G. Perry, circa 1918
- Born: November 8, 1883; Boston
- Died: April 4, 1975 (aged 91); North Andover, Massachusetts
- Occupation: Architect

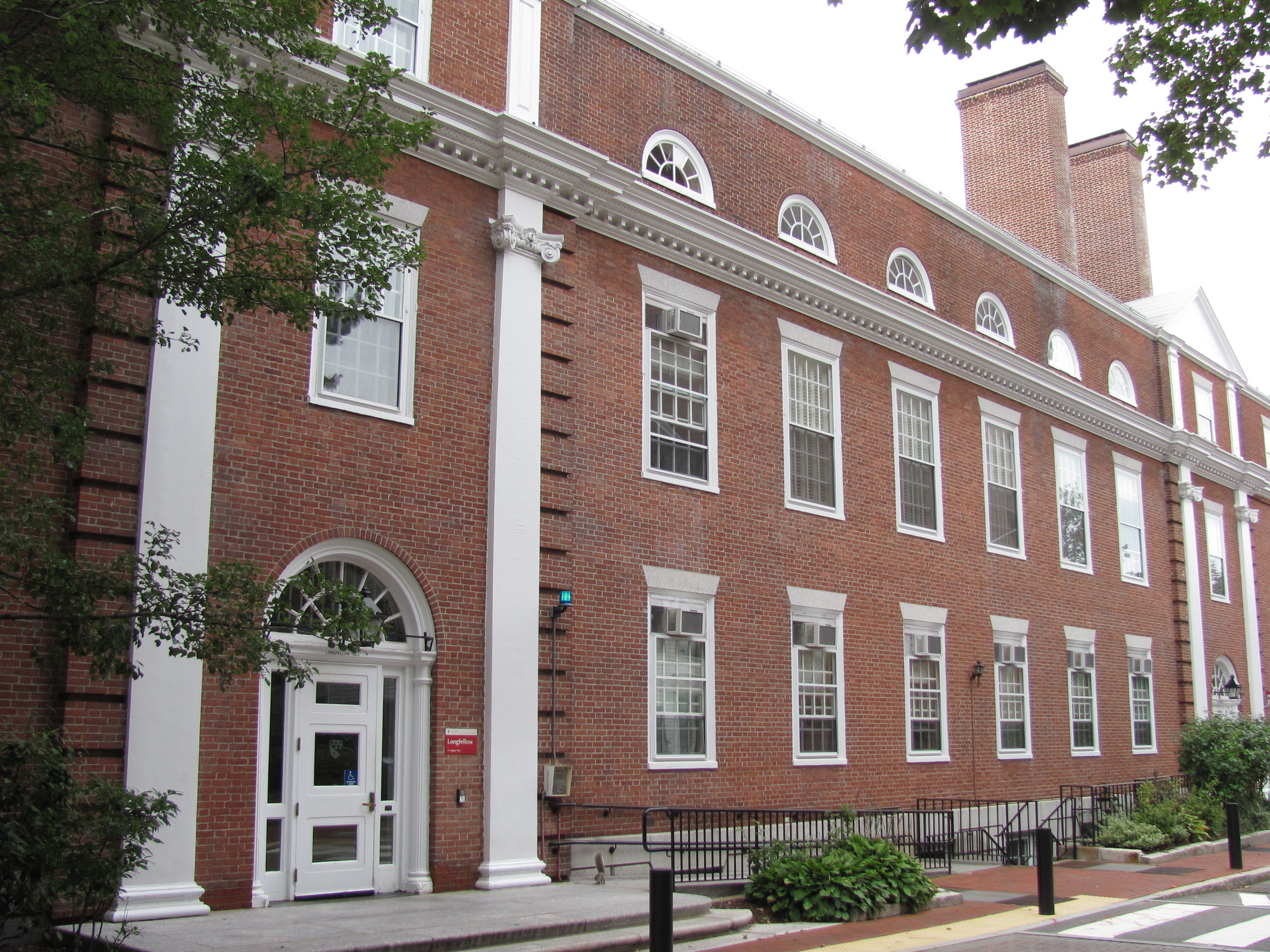
Longfellow Hall of Harvard University, completed in 1929.

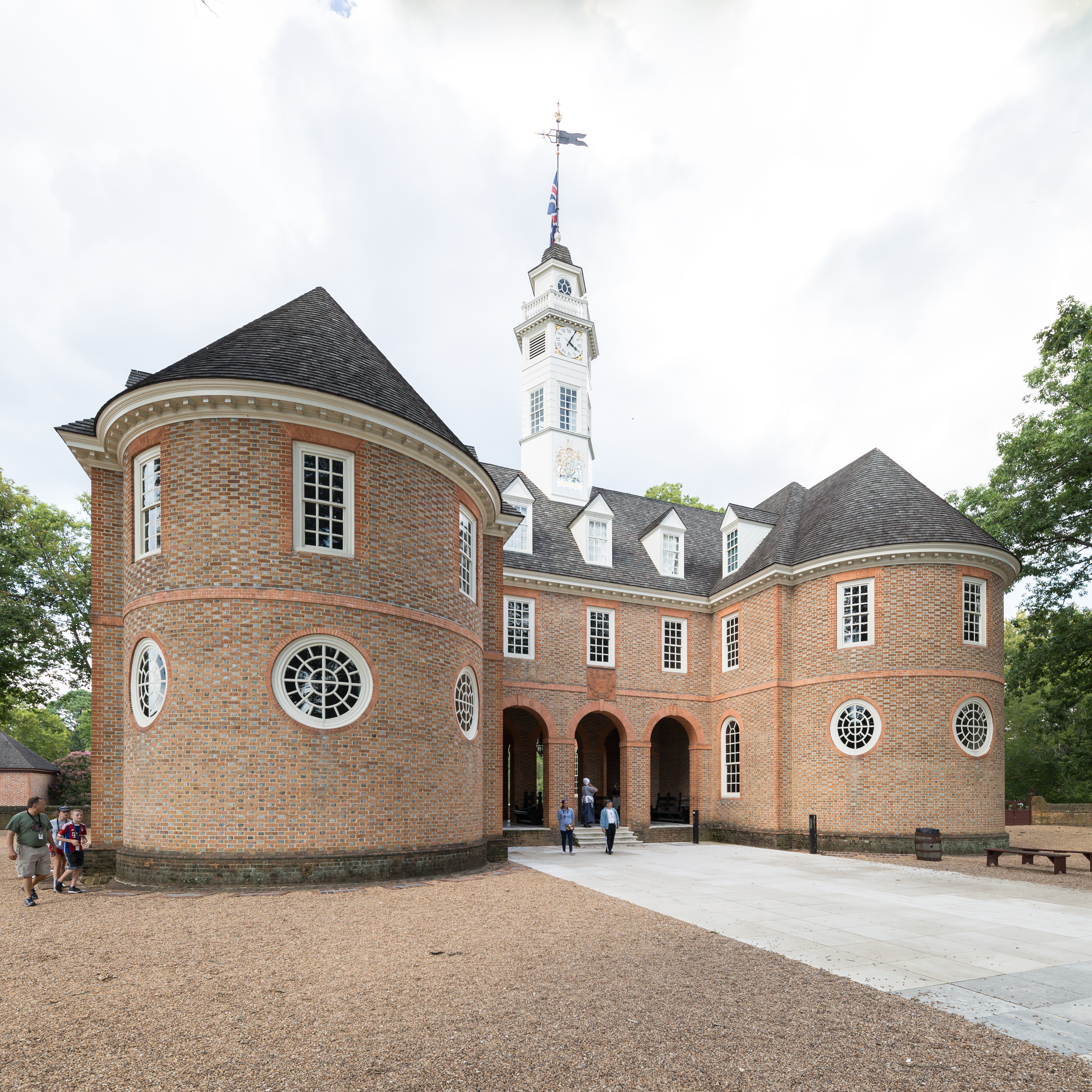
The reconstructed Capitol at Williamsburg, completed in 1934.

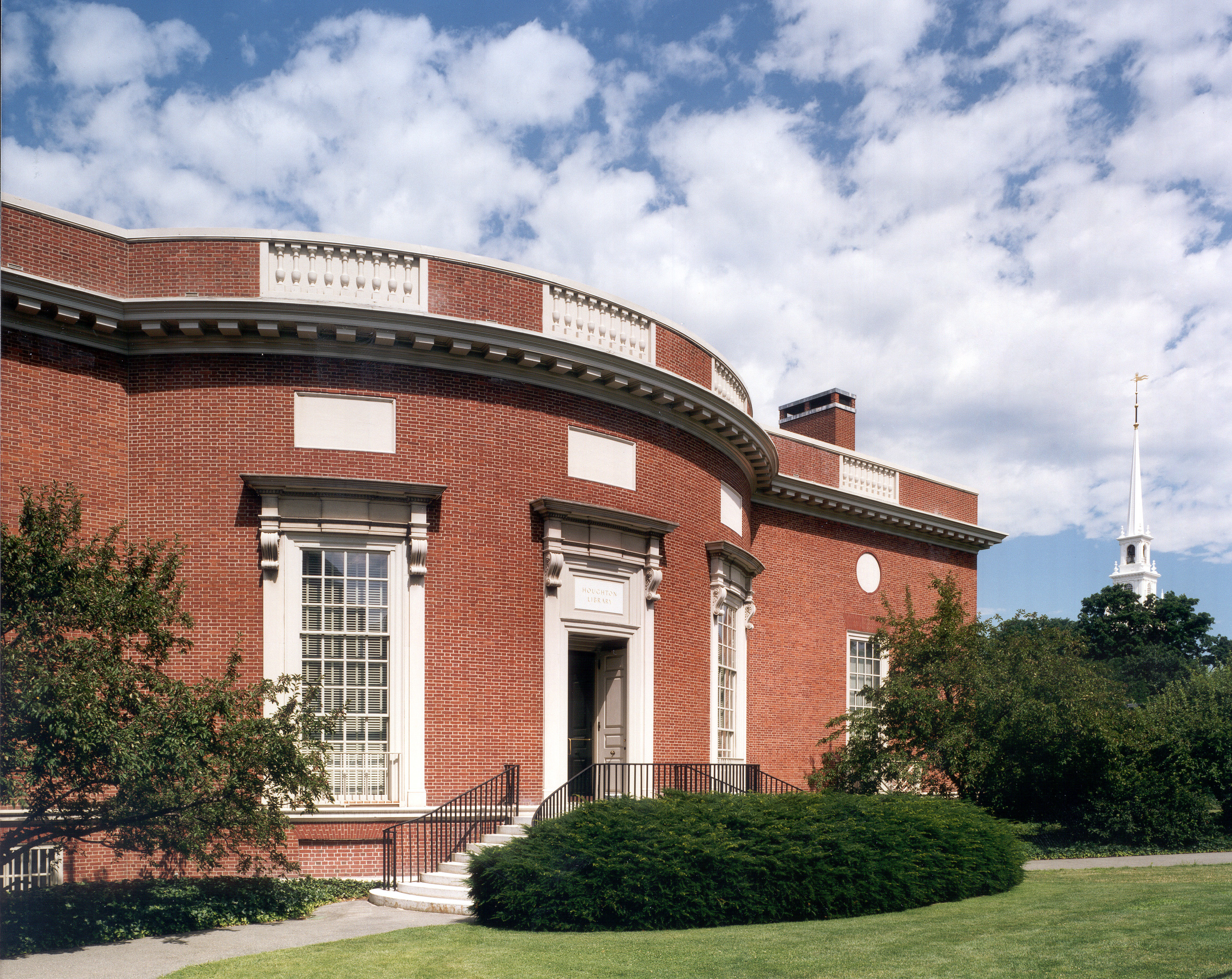
Houghton Library of Harvard University, completed in 1942.

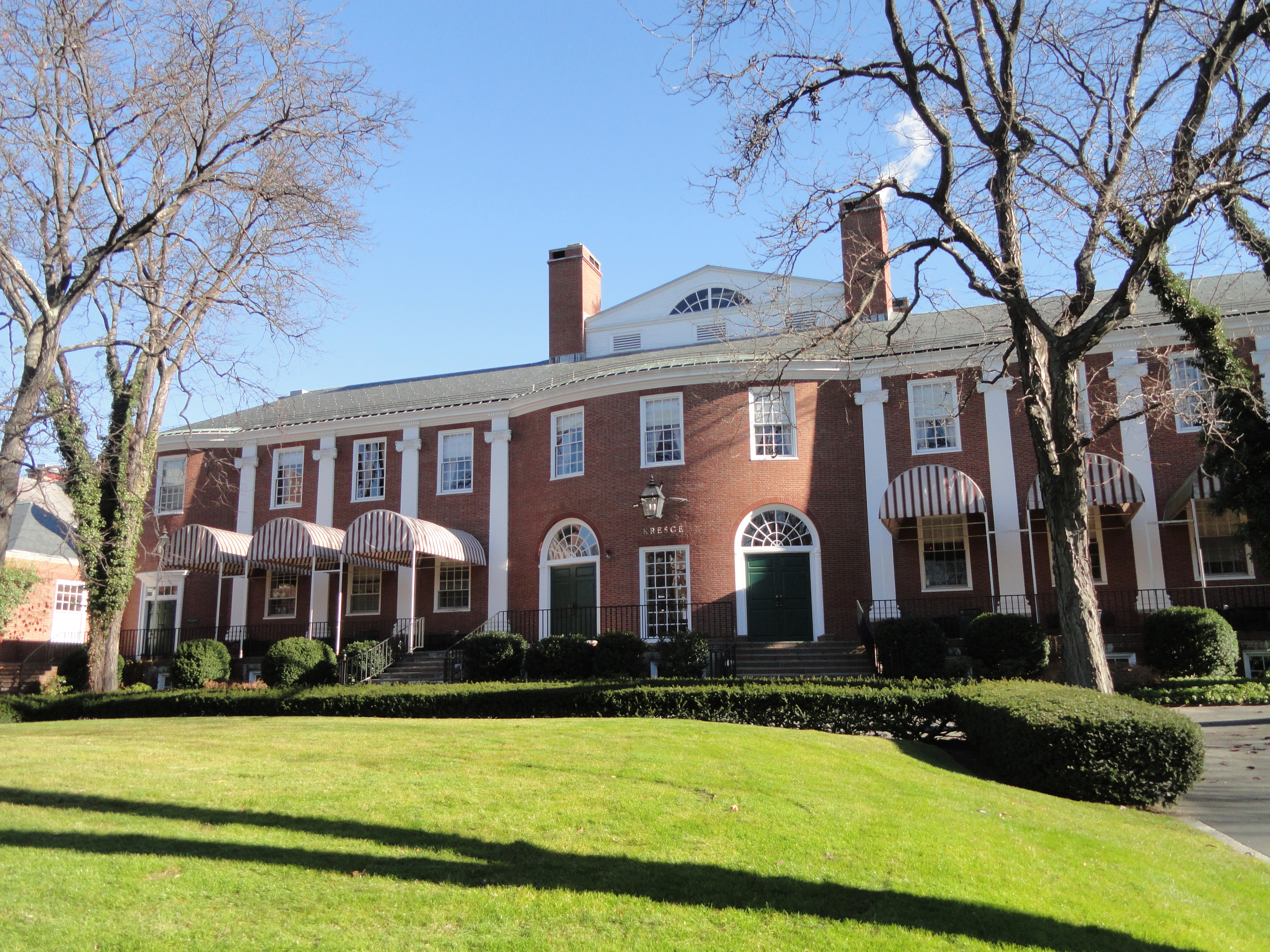
The former Kresge Hall of Harvard Business School, completed in 1953 and demolished in 2014.

William G. Perry, FAIA (1883–1975), was an American architect who practiced in Boston from 1915 to 1974. In 1923, Perry co–founded the architectural firm now known as Perry Dean Rogers Architects and is best known for the restoration of Colonial Williamsburg, beginning in 1927.

== Life and career ==
William Graves Perry was born on November 8, 1883, in Boston to Charles French Perry and Georgianna West (Graves) Perry. He was educated at Harvard University and the Massachusetts Institute of Technology, graduating from the latter in 1907. After a few months with architects Shepley, Rutan & Coolidge he traveled to Paris, where he sat for and passed the entrance examinations for the École des Beaux-Arts. He earned his diplôme in 1913 and returned to the United States. In Boston he returned to Shepley, Rutan & Coolidge while also teaching design at the Boston Architectural Club. In 1915, he formed his own practice. In 1917, upon the United States' entry into World War I, he enlisted in the United States Army, leaving his business in charge of an associate. During the war he was stationed in France and supervised the construction of airfields. He was discharged in 1919, and returned to Boston.

In 1923 Perry merged his practice with that of T. Mott Shaw and Andrew Hopewell Hepburn, established in 1921, to form the new firm of Perry, Shaw & Hepburn. In 1949 they were joined by partners Christopher M. Kehoe and Robert C. Dean in the renamed Perry, Shaw & Hepburn, Kehoe & Dean. After Kehoe's sudden death in 1952, the firm became Perry, Shaw, Hepburn & Dean. Both Shaw and Hepburn retired in 1962, though it was not until 1968 that the firm was reorganized as Perry, Dean & Stewart with the addition of Clifford D. Stewart. Perry retired from practice in 1974, leaving his partners in charge. The firm was renamed several times until arriving at Perry Dean Rogers Architects, its current (2023) name, in 1982.

In the 1920s Perry, Shaw & Hepburn emerged as one of the United States' leading designers of Colonial Revival buildings. This led to the commission, in 1927 from John D. Rockefeller Jr., for the restoration of what would become Colonial Williamsburg in Virginia. Perry was chief architect of the Williamsburg project until 1953 and was responsible for the restoration of many buildings and the complete reconstruction of others, including the Capitol and Governor's Palace, both completed in 1934. Other important works in the Colonial style include major buildings for Brown University, Furman University and Harvard University and a major extension to the Jordan Marsh building in Boston. After World War II the firm began completing many Modern buildings, the design of which were usually led by Robert C. Dean, though Perry also embraced, to a degree, the Modern movement.

Perry joined the American Institute of Architects in 1920 and was elected as a Fellow in 1936.

== Personal life ==
Perry was married in 1908 to Eleanor Gray Bodine at Villanova, Pennsylvania. They lived in Paris while Perry was attending the Beaux-Arts, and after their return lived in Boston. In 1915 they moved to Medfield, where they associated themselves with local church and civic affairs. They had three children: Eleanor G. Perry (1910–1986), William G. Perry Jr. (1913–1998) and Louise B. Perry (1923–1997). In the 1920s they moved to Brookline, and divorced in 1934. In 1945 he remarried to Frances Adams (McElfresh) Ames. Perry died on April 4, 1975, in a nursing home in North Andover, Massachusetts.

== Architectural works ==
Works in private practice include:

- Medfield Public Library, 468 Main St, Medfield, Massachusetts (1917)
- St. Paul's Episcopal Church, (Note: With consulting architect R. Clipston Sturgis.) 166 High St, Newburyport, Massachusetts (1922–23)

By the 1970s, the firm of Perry, Shaw & Hepburn and its successors had completed about a thousand projects. Those where Perry had a prominent role include

- Merchants Square, W Duke of Gloucester St, Williamsburg, Virginia (1927, NRHP 2006)
- Roxbury Latin School, 101 St Theresa Ave, West Roxbury, Boston (1927)
- Longfellow Hall, Harvard University, Cambridge, Massachusetts (1929)
- Eliot School (former), 5 Auburn St, Natick, Massachusetts (1938)
- Wellesley High School, 50 Rice St, Wellesley, Massachusetts (1938 et seq., demolished 2012)
- Shirley Hall, 1109 S Bay Shore Dr, Virginia Beach, Virginia (1940, NRHP 1999)
- Houghton Library, Harvard University, Cambridge, Massachusetts (1942)
- Wriston Quadrangle, Brown University, Providence, Rhode Island (1950–52)
- Baxter Hall, Williams College, Williamstown, Massachusetts (1952–53, demolished 2004)
- Sloan Laboratory, Massachusetts Institute of Technology, Cambridge, Massachusetts (1952)
- Aldrich Hall, Harvard Business School, Allston, Boston (1953)
- Kresge Hall, Harvard Business School, Allston, Boston (1953, demolished 1953)

Restorations and reconstructions include:

- Colonial Williamsburg (1927–53)
  - Raleigh Tavern, Williamsburg, Virginia (1930–31)
  - Capitol, Williamsburg, Virginia (1931–34)
  - Governor's Palace, Williamsburg, Virginia (1931–34)
- MacPheadris–Warner House, 150 Daniel St, Portsmouth, New Hampshire (1939)
- Tryon Palace, 529 South Front St, New Bern, North Carolina (1952–59)
- Saugus Iron Works National Historic Site, 244 Central St, Saugus, Massachusetts (1953–54)
