= Jonathan Hildreth House =

Historic house in Massachusetts, United States

- U.S. National Register of Historic Places
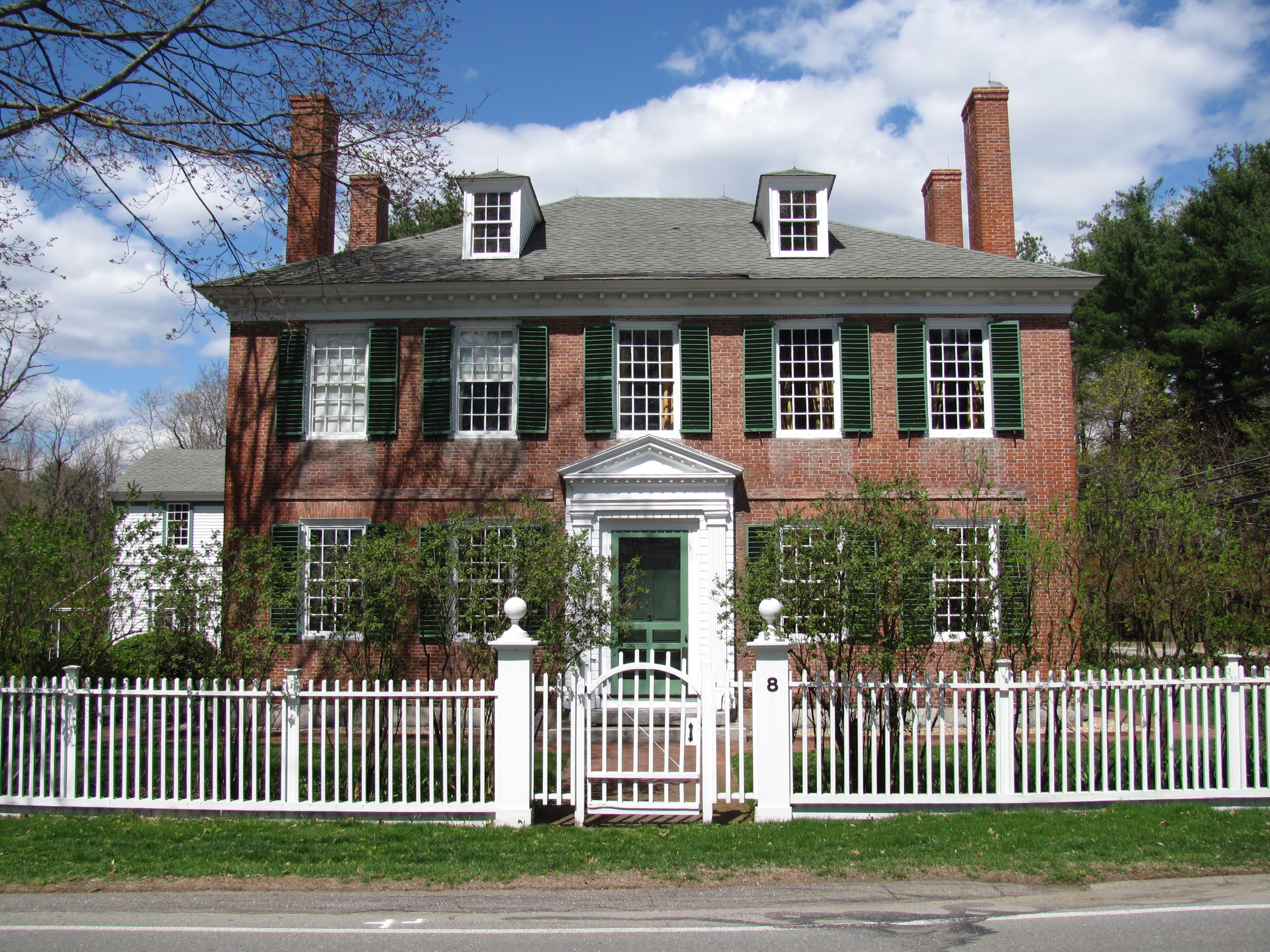

- Location within Massachusetts Location within the United States
- Location: 8 Barrett's Mill Road, Concord, Massachusetts
- Coordinates: 42°28′27″N 71°21′56″W
- Built: c. 1783
- Architect: Reuben Duren, Andrew Hopewell Hepburn
- Architectural style: Colonial Revival, Georgian
- NRHP reference No.: 91000362
- Added to NRHP: April 3, 1991

The Jonathan Hildreth House is a historic house in Concord, Massachusetts.

== Description and history ==
Built c. 1783–90 by local builder Reuben Duren, this large two-story house is one of the town's finest late Georgian/early Federal style houses. The Hildreth family operated a store in a separate building on the property until it burned down in 1909. The house is finished on three sides in brick laid in Flemish bond, with the rear of the house finished in wood clapboards. There are two pairs of chimneys set near the sides of the house, piercing the hip roof. The main entry has a dentilated triangular pediment, supported by pilasters, with the door recessed into the brick wall. The interior has lavish Georgian styling.

The house was listed on the National Register of Historic Places on April 3, 1991.

== See also ==
- National Register of Historic Places listings in Concord, Massachusetts
