= Perry Dean Rogers Architects =

Architectural firm in Boston, Massachusetts

Perry Dean Rogers

Practice information
- Key architects: Martha A. Pilgreen
- Founders: Thomas Mott Shaw; Andrew Hopewell Hepburn; William G. Perry
- Founded: 1919
- Dissolved: active
- Location: Boston

Significant works and honors
- Design: Colonial Williamsburg
- Awards: Harleston Parker Medal

Perry Dean Rogers is an American architectural firm based in Boston, Massachusetts. The firm was founded as Shaw and Hepburn by Thomas Mott Shaw and Andrew Hopewell Hepburn in 1919, and became Perry, Shaw & Hepburn with the addition of William G. Perry in 1921. The firm became known for its designs for many universities and colleges, but is best known for restoring Colonial Williamsburg.

== History ==
The firm originated in 1919 as Shaw and Hepburn, with founders Thomas Mott Shaw and Andrew Hopewell Hepburn. In 1921, William Graves Perry joined the firm, creating Perry, Shaw & Hepburn.

The firm became notable for its designs for educational institutions. It was responsible for the restoration of Colonial Williamsburg. It designed the Radcliffe College yard and its Longfellow Hall, which was a recipient of the Harleston Parker Medal in 1934.

Perry Dean Rogers recently completed designing an entire college campus, masterplan and the individual buildings for the Franklin W. Olin College of Engineering in Needham, Massachusetts. William G. Perry was also hired to transform the Endicott Estate into a Governor's Mansion.

== Selected projects ==
- Academic Library, Rowan University, Glassboro, New Jersey
- American Bureau of Shipping Information Commons, Massachusetts Maritime Academy, Buzzards Bay, Massachusetts
- Andrews Hall, Pembroke College (now Brown University), Providence, Rhode Island
- Barone Campus Center, Fairfield University, Fairfield, Connecticut
- Baxter Hall, Williams College, Williamstown, Massachusetts
- Bowen-Thompson Student Union, Bowling Green State University, Bowling Green, Ohio
- Cambridge American Cemetery and Memorial, Cambridgeshire, England
- Cohen Center for Holocaust & Genocide Studies, Keene State College, Keene, New Hampshire
- College of William & Mary, Williamsburg, Virginia
  - Brafferton (restoration)
  - President's House (restoration)
  - Wren Building (restoration)
- Colonial Wiliamsburg (restoration), Williamsburg, Virginia
  - Bruton Parish Church (restoration)
  - Capitol (reconstruction)
  - Colonial Wiliamsburg (restoration master plan)
  - Governor's Palace (reconstruction)
  - Merchants Square
  - Raleigh Tavern (reconstruction)
  - Williamsburg Inn
  - Williamsburg Lodge
- The Commons, University of Maryland, Baltimore County, Catonsville, Maryland
- Court House (restoration), New Castle Delaware
- Dillon Arts Center, Groton School, Groton, Massachusetts
- duPont Ball Library, Stetson University, DeLand, Florida
- Embassy of the United States, Amman, Jordan
- Embassy of the United States, London, England
- Emerson Library, Webster University, Webster Groves, Missouri
- Enoch Pratt Free Library, Baltimore, Maryland
- Fontaine Hall, Marist College, Poughkeepsie, New York
- Franklin W. Olin College of Engineering, Needham, Massachusetts
- Furman University, Greenville, South Carolina
  - Daniel Music Recital Building
  - Furman University Master Plan
  - James B. Duke Library
  - McAlister Auditorium
  - Thomas Roe Visual Arts Building
- Galbreath Memorial Chapel, Ohio University, Athens, Ohio
- Greenville Civic Center, Greenville, South Carolina
- Hamilton College, Clinton, New York
  - Walter J. Beinecke Student Activities Village
  - William M. Bristol Jr. Pool
- Harvard University, Boston, Massachusetts
  - Aldrich Hall
  - Houghton Library
  - Kresge Hall
- Helen Carpenter Moseley residence, Newburyport, Massachusetts
- Henry A. Laughlin house, Concord, Massachusetts
- Institute of Contemporary Art, Boston, Massachusetts
- Janet Wallace Fine Arts Center, Macalester College, Saint Paul, Minnesota
- Jordan Marsh Department Store (Macy's), Boston, Massachusetts
- Kaleidoscope Performing Arts Center, Ursinus College, Collegeville, Pennsylvania
- Liberty Mutual Insurance Corporate Office, Boston, Massachusetts
- Longacre, Appomattox Virginia
- Lutnick Library, Haverford College, Haverford, Pennsylvania
- Lyman Plant House, Smith College, Northampton, Massachusetts
- Marshall's Wharf II, Boston, Massachusetts
- Massachusetts General Hospital, Boston, Massachusetts
- Massachusetts Institute of Technology, Cambridge, Massachusetts
  - Baker Dormitory (renovation)
  - Simmons Hall
- Massachusetts National Cemetery, Barnstable County, Massachusetts
- Mccain Library, Agnes Scott College, Decatur, Georgia
- Meyer Library Information Center, Southwest Missouri State University, Springfield, Missouri
- Middlesex/Essex General Mail Facility, United States Postal Service, North Reading, Massachusetts
- Milton Hershey School Town Center, Hershey, Pennsylvania
- Museum of Science Central Building, Boston, Massachusetts
- National Resource Corporation (now Tang Center for Management Education), Cambridge, Massachusetts
- Norwich University, Northfield, Vermont
  - Library
  - Wise Campus Center
- Old Corner Bookstore and Andrew Cunningham House and Shop (restoration), Boston, Massachusetts
- Old State House Council Chamber (restoration), Boston, Massachusetts
- Olin Memorial Library, Wesleyan University, Middletown, Connecticut
- Radcliffe University
  - Alice Longfellow Hall
  - Radcliffe Yard
- Research & Information Commons, Daemen College, Amherst, New York
- Robert H. Goddard Library, Clark University, Worcester, Massachusetts
- St. Paul’s Episcopal Church, Newburyport, Massachusetts
- Saugus Iron Works (restoration), Saugus, Massachusetts
- Science Center, Wellesley College, Wellesley Massachusetts
- Seeley G. Mudd Chemistry Building, Vassar College, Poughkeepsie, New York
- Southern New Hampshire University, Manchester, New Hampshire
  - Edward S. Wolak Library Learning Commons
  - Gustafson Center
- Strawbery Banke, Portsmouth, New Hampshire
- Tyron Palace (reconstruction), New Bern, North Carolina
- University of Arkansas, Fayetteville, Arkansas
  - Hillside Auditorium
  - Hunt Center for Academic Excellence
  - Library Annex
- Varian Building, North Shore Community College, Massachusetts
- Waidner-Spahr Library, Dickinson College, Carlisle, Pennsylvania
- Wellesley High School, Wellesley Massachusetts
- Wellesley Town Hall (restoration), Wellesley Massachusetts
- William R. Perkins Library, Duke University, Durham, North Carolina
- Worcester Centrum Center, Worcester, Massachusetts
- Worcester Dining Commons, University of Massachusetts Amherst, Amherst, Massachusetts
