= St. George Tucker House =

Coordinates: 37.27242°N 76.70111°W

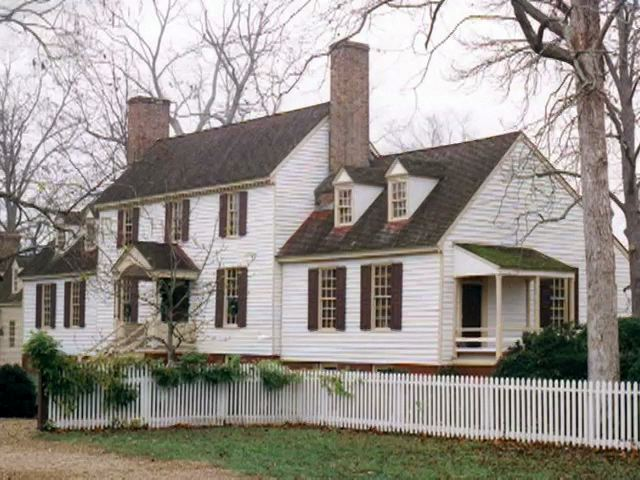
- Location: Williamsburg, Virginia, USA
- Built: 1718-19

The St. George Tucker House is one of the original colonial homes in Historic Williamsburg. It was built in 1718–19 for William Levingston (who, incidentally, built the first theater in America). The house eventually came into the hands of St. George Tucker who had moved from Bermuda to Williamsburg. Tucker was a lawyer and professor of law at the College of William and Mary and later became a state and federal judge. In 1796, Judge Tucker wrote a controversial pamphlet addressed to the General Assembly of Virginia. In it he laid out a plan to end slavery in Virginia because "the abolition of slavery was of great importance for the moral character of the citizens of Virginia." He is also famous for his 1803 edition of "Blackstone's Commentaries" which has become an indispensable American law text.

The St. George Tucker House began as a simple structure but over the years, Tucker made many additions to the house to accommodate his growing family. Among these were chimneys, a second story, an east and west wing, a kitchen and bathrooms. St. George's son, Nathaniel Tucker continued the tradition and implemented many changes of his own. The family kept extensive records making the St. George Tucker House the most well documented home in Williamsburg.

Of the many stories and anecdotes tied to the house, one of the most enduring is that of the first Christmas tree in Williamsburg. A German professor, Professor Charles Minnigerode, a friend of St. George's son, was a frequent guest in the home. In 1842, he introduced the Tucker children to a German style holiday celebration. Following the German tradition, a small evergreen tree was brought into the house. To the delight of the children they proceeded to decorate the tree with gilded nuts, marbleized paper, and strings of popcorn. The following December most families in Williamsburg had a Christmas tree in their parlor. The tradition soon spread throughout Virginia. To this day during the holiday season the only Christmas tree in Colonial Williamsburg can be found in the St. George Tucker House to commemorate that first tree.

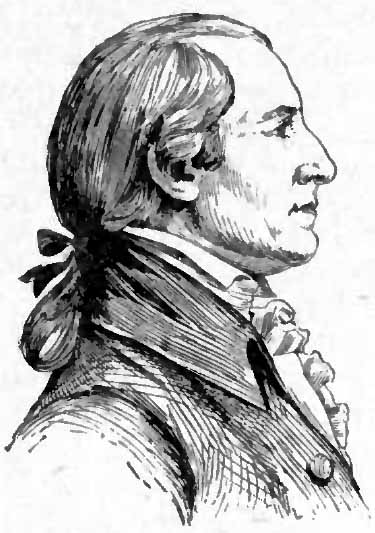
St. George Tucker

Tucker was somewhat of a disciplinarian as respected his children and other young residents, and being a judge, naturally drafted rules for the youngsters, called "Garrison Articles" to regulate behavior in the house. The children and visiting William and Mary students, somewhat-tongue-in cheek, then labeled the residence "Ft. St. George".

In 1930 the Coleman family, descendants of St. George, deeded the house to Colonial Williamsburg with a life tenancy agreement. It was not until 1993, after the death of Tucker's great, great granddaughter, Dr. Janet (Coleman) Kimbrogh, that the house was turned over to Colonial Williamsburg. The last private resident to the home was Mr. Erich Tucker Kimbrough while he was a student at the William & Mary Law School. Remarkably, "the Tucker House" (as the family calls it) remained a private residence in the midst of Colonial Williamsburg until the early 1990s.

Once in the hands of Colonial Williamsburg, mechanical and electrical systems were brought up to date including a bathroom constructed in compliance with the Americans with Disabilities Act. The necessary modernization notwithstanding, the classic 18th-century style of the house remains faithfully intact.

Today the St. George Tucker house is used as an elegant reception center for donors of Colonial Williamsburg.
