= Merchants Square =

Retail village in Williamsburng, Virginia

- Merchants Square and Resort Historic District
- U.S. National Register of Historic Places
- U.S. Historic district
- Virginia Landmarks Register
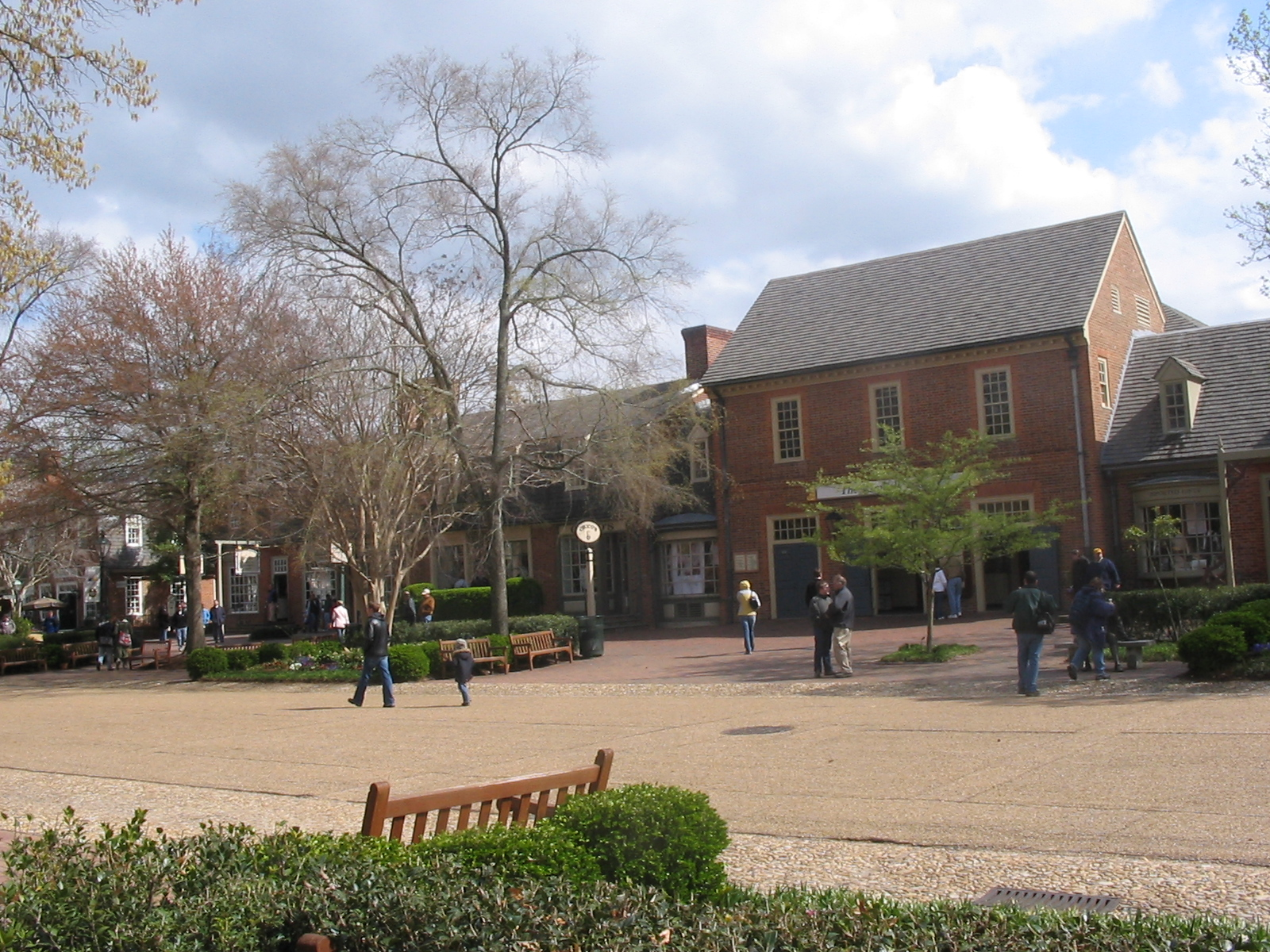
- Merchants Square in spring

- Location within Virginia Location within the United States
- Location: Boundary St., Duke of Gloucester St., S. England St., Francis St., Henry St. Prince George St., Williamsburg, Virginia
- Coordinates: 37°16′14″N 76°42′6″W
- Area: 49 acres (20 ha)
- Built: 1927
- Architect: Perry, Shaw & Hepburn et al.
- Architectural style: Colonial, Colonial Revival
- NRHP reference No.: 06000365
- VLR No.: 137-5027

Significant dates
- Added to NRHP: May 3, 2006
- Designated VLR: December 7, 2005

Merchants Square is a 20th-century interpretation of an 18th-century-style retail village in Colonial Williamsburg, Virginia, United States. It is listed on the National Register of Historic Places.

== History ==
Conceived in 1927 by John D. Rockefeller Jr. and Reverend W. A. R. Goodwin, Merchants Square is considered to be one of the first planned shopping districts in the United States, if not the first. Small shops throughout Williamsburg would move into a centrally located area that used architecture that was in harmony with the restoration's character. William G. Perry, chief architect of the Williamsburg Restoration, designed the shopping district.

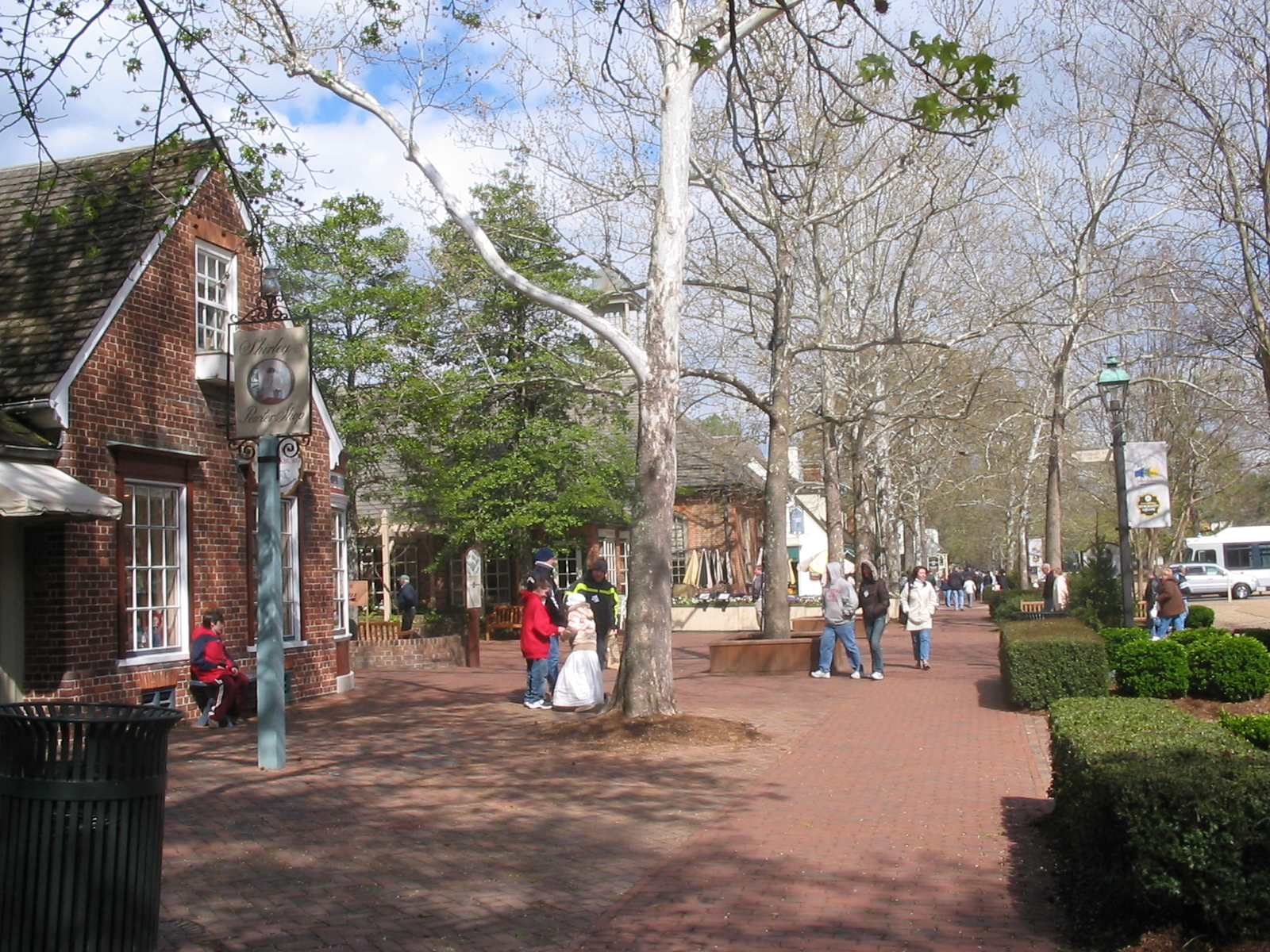
Another view of the square

Most of the stores and shops are located on Duke of Gloucester Street (DoG St.) right across from The College of William & Mary’s campus. To keep the area as close to historical accuracy as possible, all telephone wires were placed underground, and modern day technologies such as air-conditioning ducts and garage equipment were hidden with shrubs and plantings.

== Present day ==
Today there are over 40 shops and restaurants located in Merchants Square. The area is also used for other purposes, such as seasonal concerts, a farmers' market, and special movie screenings.
