= Williamsburg Inn =

Hotel in Virginia, United States

- U.S. National Register of Historic Places
- Virginia Landmarks Register
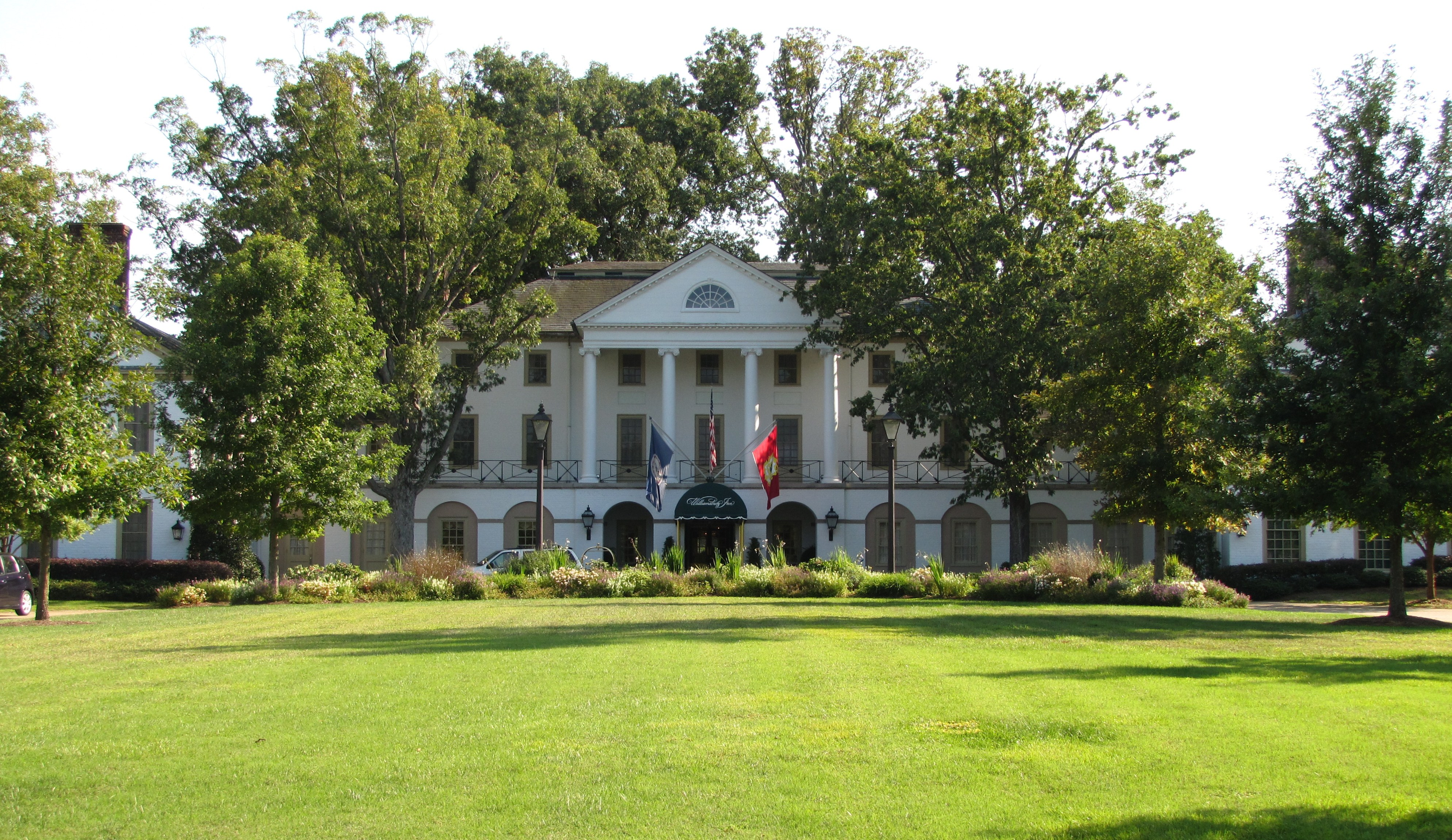
- Williamsburg Inn, September 2012

- Location within Virginia Location within the United States
- Location: 136 E. Francis St., Williamsburg, Virginia
- Coordinates: 37°16′08″N 76°41′52″W
- Area: 12.5 acres (5.1 ha)
- Built: 1937
- Architect: Perry, Shaw & Hepburn
- Architectural style: Colonial Revival
- NRHP reference No.: 97000480
- VLR No.: 137-0079

Significant dates
- Added to NRHP: June 4, 1997
- Designated VLR: March 19, 1997

Williamsburg Inn is a historic resort hotel located at Williamsburg, Virginia. It was built in three phases between 1937 and 1972. The original section was designed by Perry Dean Rogers Architects and is dominated by a two-story portico which stands atop a ground floor arcade. It is a three-story, seven-bay, Colonial Revival style brick structure. It has two-story flanking wings in an "H"-shape. The East Wing addition, also by Perry Dean Rogers Architects, consists of multiple wings of guest rooms set at right angles to one another. A third phase embracing the Regency Dining Room and its adjoining courtyard, was completed in 1972. The inn represented John D. Rockefeller Jr.'s commitment to bring the message of Williamsburg to a larger audience of influential Americans.

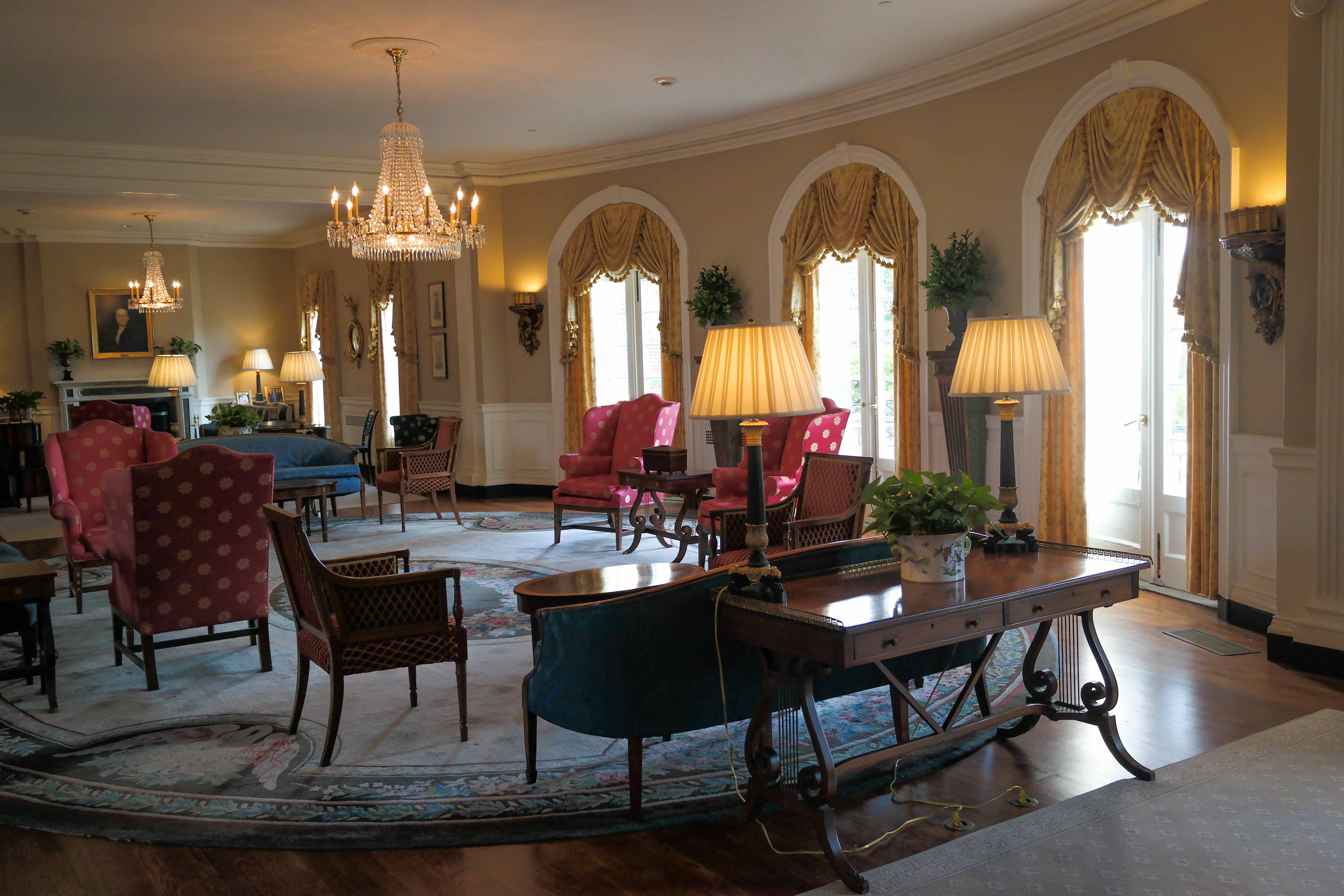
Williamsburg Inn, 2015

It was listed on the National Register of Historic Places in 1997. Williamsburg Inn is a member of Historic Hotels of America, a program of the National Trust for Historic Preservation.

The inn has twice hosted Queen Elizabeth II and her husband Prince Philip, Duke of Edinburgh, in 1957 and 2007 while visiting Jamestown, Virginia. These visits marked the original settlement of the British colonists on the 350th and 400th anniversaries when the British first landed in America.

== See also ==
- List of Historic Hotels of America
