= Seaside Village Historic District =

Historic district in Connecticut, United States

- U.S. National Register of Historic Places
- U.S. Historic district
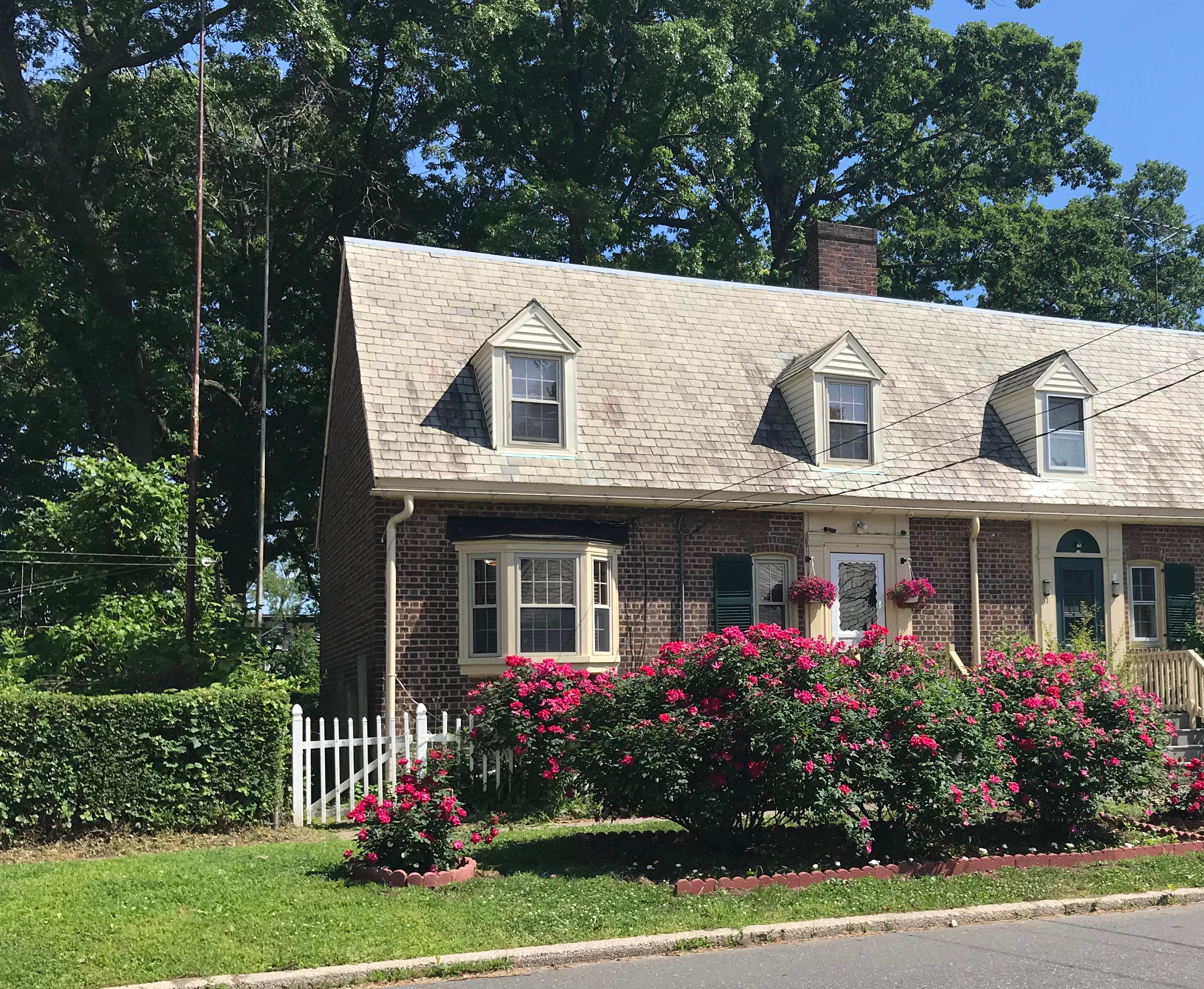
- Brick Homes with Slate Roofs and Gardens, 2018

- Location within Connecticut Location within the United States
- Location: West Side of Iranistan Avenue between South Street and Forest Street Bridgeport, Connecticut
- Coordinates: 41°9′59″N 73°11′56″W
- Area: 16.5 acres (6.7 ha)
- Architects: Sturgis, R. Clipston; Shurtleff, Arthur A.
- Architectural style: Colonial Revival
- MPS: Wartime Emergency Housing in Bridgeport MPS
- NRHP reference No.: 90001424
- Added to NRHP: September 26, 1990

Historic Seaside Village Co-operative encompasses a primarily residential area in the South End of Bridgeport, Connecticut. It is bounded on the east by Iranistan Avenue, the north by South Avenue, the south by Forest Court and by the west by Alsace Street.

The property consists of a densely built collection of brick rowhouses, arranged in irregular combinations. The village was developed during World War I to alleviate a housing shortage caused by an influx of workers hired to work in the city's munitions factories. It was an early government-funded project of this type, and was a collaborative design effort by R. Clipston Sturgis, Skinner & Walker, and Arthur Shurtleff. The district was listed on the National Register of Historic Places in 1990.

== Overview ==
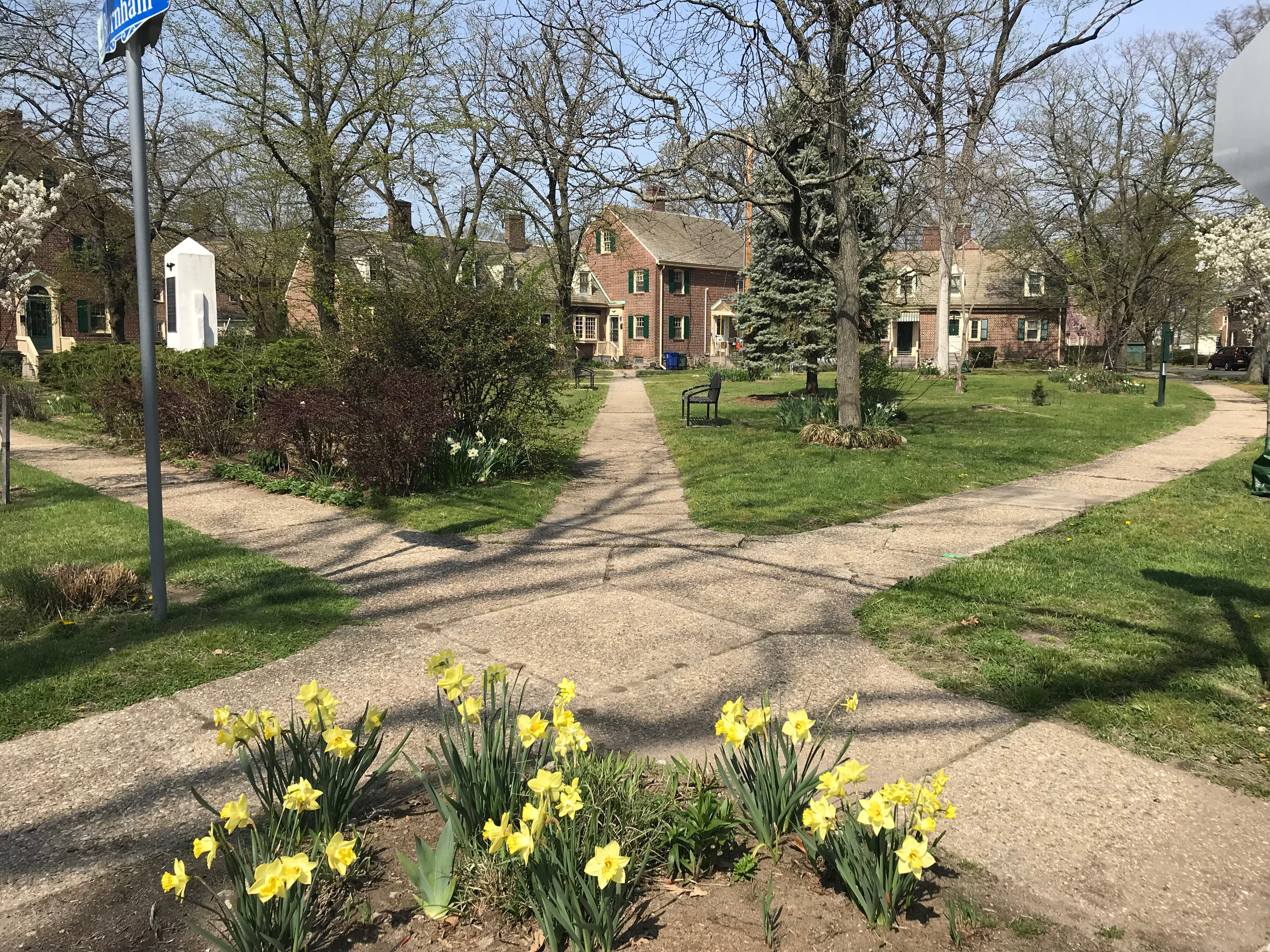
View of Albert Square, the village green, at Seaside Village.

Seaside Village was built by the federal government in response to the housing problem for factory workers in World War I. Bridgeport manufacturers had expanded their factories, but were unable to maximize production due to a lack of adequate housing for workers.

Bridgeport manufacturers wanted to attract workers to Bridgeport, both for the short-term war needs and for the future, and therefore chose to build quality housing. They hired the architect R. Clipston Sturgis of Boston, and the town planner Andrew Shurleff of Boston. The local housing authority which initially built some housing in the Lordship section of Stratford and in the Grasmere section of Fairfield could not build housing fast enough to meet the needs of the war effort.

The federal government stepped in to help Bridgeport and other cities across the country. Congress authorized and funded the United States Housing Corporation (USHC) in July 1918 with $100 million in capital. The Director of USHC's town planning division was Frederick Law Olmsted Jr., whose father designed Central Park and Seaside Park.

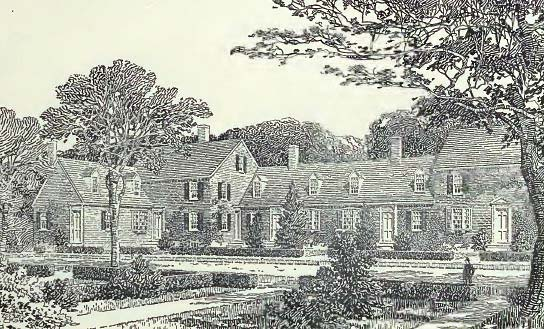
Engraving of Seaside Village from 1919 U.S. Housing Report Vol 2

The USHC chose a number of locations in Bridgeport to build worker housing, but the largest lot was the one owned by The Crane Corporation. It became known as the Crane Lot or the Crane Development until shortly before it was completed, when it was renamed Seaside Village. Its location within walking distance of many factories and its proximity to Seaside Park made it desirable.

Seaside Village was built in approximately 90 days, starting in late October 1918 and ending in early March 1919. 377 homes were planned, but only 257 were built due to the end of the war shortly after construction began.

Seaside Village began as rentals for factory workers and their families, but became owner-occupied by 1955, when 90% of the tenants agreed to become part of cooperative housing.

Seaside Village is on the National Register of Historic Places due to its architecture, community planning, and social history. It became one of the first collaborations of city planners, architects, and landscape designers in creating a comprehensive approach to community planning.

== Early history of Seaside Village ==
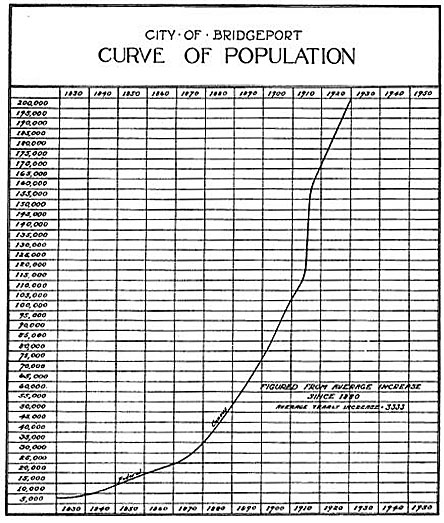
Bridgeport's population growth 1830-1930

Bridgeport's population more than tripled from 1880 to 1914, growing from 30,000 to 115,000 as immigrant labor arrived and manufacturing expanded.

From 1914 to 1916, the population grew from 115,000 to 175,000 as Bridgeport factories supplied European countries and the U.S. with war-related products.

The manufacturers had expanded their factories, however they were unable to meet production quotas due to a severe lack of adequate housing for the workers. The housing shortage was so severe that workers were buying train tickets and sleeping in the railway terminal, renting eight hour shifts in rooming houses to sleep, and the City even considered building massive tents for housing up to 10 families.

The Bridgeport Housing Company was formed in 1916 to deal with this housing problem. It was composed of about a dozen manufacturers and public service companies with capital of $1,000,000. One of its first actions was to appoint R. Clipston Sturgis of Boston, as the architect and Andrew Shurtleff as the town planner. The town planner controlled most aspects of the project. Mr. W. H. Ham, a Boston engineer, was appointed as the general manager.

R. Clipston Sturges was President of the American Institute of Architects from 1913–1915. He was involved in designing the wings for BuIfinch's state house in Boston. Sturgis also designed the Perkins Institute for the Blind in Watertown, Massachusetts.

Arthur Shurtleff studied under Charles Eliot from 1895 to 1896 at Harvard and worked for Olmsted Brothers Landscape Architects from 1896 through 1905, before he opened his own firm in Boston. Along with Frederick Law Olmsted Jr., he was an early faculty member of Harvard University's landscape architecture program, founded in 1900.

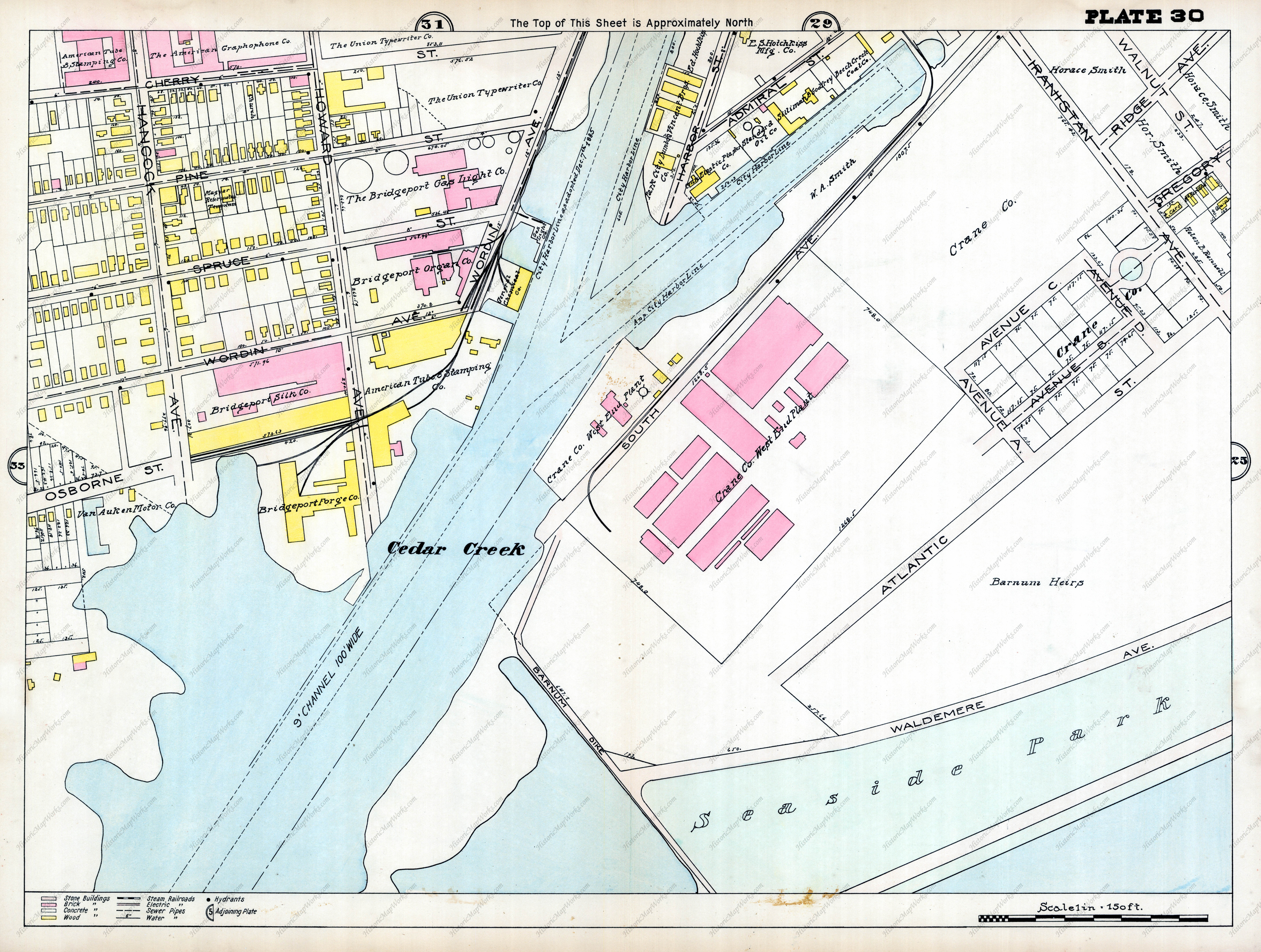
The land that Seaside Village was built on was called the Crane Tract because it belonged to the Crane Corporation, which had a large factory shown in pink on the map. The Crane Tract is on the upper right. The plots shown along Atlantic Avenue were part of the Crane Tract and were apparently plans for buildings that were never built.

William H. Ham graduated from Dartmouth College in 1897 and in 1898 from the Thayer School (Dartmouth) of Civil Engineering and Architecture. From 1908 to 1916 Mr. Ham was a member of the firm of French and Hubbard, consulting engineers on factory buildings. He then became manager of the Bridgeport Housing Company.

The first of the United States Housing Corporation projects to be completed was Black Rock Gardens, followed by the Wilmot Apartments, both designed by Sturgis with Skinner and Walker as associate architects. Seaside Village, the third to be finished, was designed by Sturgis with Andrew H. Hepburn as associate architect.

The Crane site was chosen because it was within walking distance of the West End shops and would enable most workers to come home for lunch. It was adjacent to the Crane Company plant and had been part of the Crane Company property until the federal government purchased the land. It was renamed "Seaside Village" prior to completion. Proximity to Seaside Park was another reason. At one time it was a marshland and had a creek running through it, but by the time it was chosen for development in 1918, the wetlands had been filled in by industrial waste.

The need for an additional architect was due to the Crane Development being the largest of the developments to be built by the USHC in Bridgeport and it was also considered to the most important one.

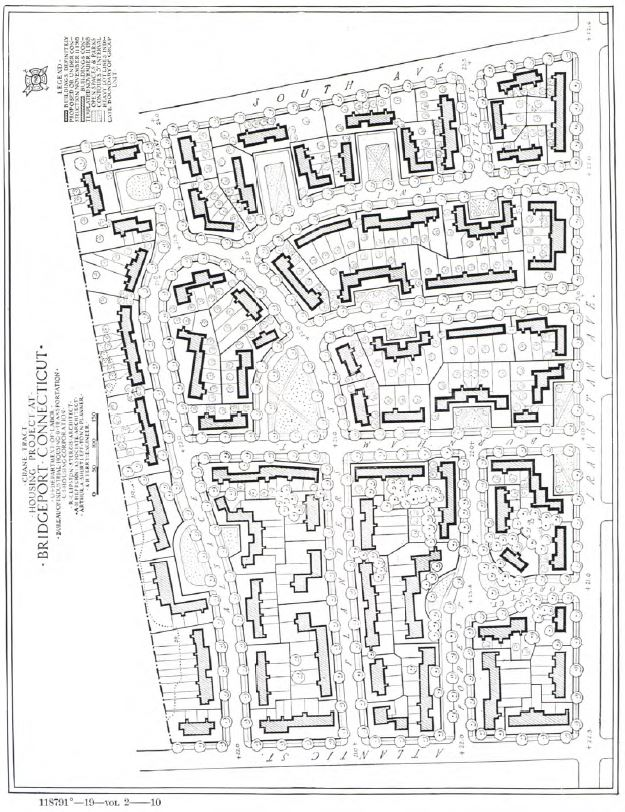
Original Plans for Seaside Village 1919 U.S. Housing Vol. 2

Chicken wire fences separated the backyards. Heating was from a coal stove in the kitchen. The pantry was designed to hold an ice box that could be drained onto the ground underneath.

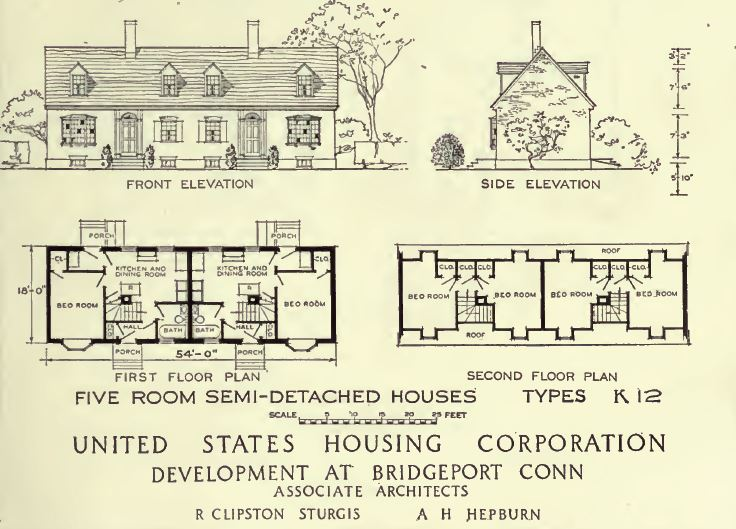
1919 building plans

By the time the final plans were submitted by the end of September, 380 homes had been planned for the Crane tract. “A central playground is a feature of these plans.”

By October, it was being referred to as the Crane Lot Housing Development. Groundbreaking was expected the week of October 21, 1918. Just three weeks later, the truce for WWI was signed on November 11, 1918. This was a problem for the Crane Development as it was only one-half of one percent complete as of November 6, 1918. By December, the City was wavering over whether to complete the housing. By March 1919, the Housing Company began to lay off workers. At this point, the newspapers began referring to the Crane Development as Seaside Village. The units rented for $15/month at a time when munitions workers were getting paid $75/week, while the average pay for a worker was $10/week.
During this same month (March 1919) H. K. Moses of the Architectural Department of the U.S. Housing Corporation and Frederick Law Olmsted Jr., Chief of the Town Planning Department visited Bridgeport. While touring Seaside Village, Mr. Moses said, “It looks like a bit of England.” Moses was a key leader in the revival of Colonial architecture in the United States.

By September 1919, the construction of Seaside Village had cost $1,971,839. Ninety-two of the units were still vacant as the war had ended and the demand for workers had abated. The Senate charged the U.S. Housing Corporation with inefficiencies and improperly spent federal money. The report stated that “A failure to promptly cease building operations on the signing of the armistice proved either a desire to complete their town beautiful experiments or to be helpful, at government expense, to the local communities involved.”

== Seaside Village 1920–1950 ==
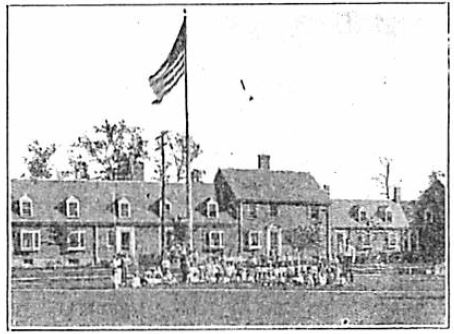
Automobile Tour photo 1920 Automobile Tour 8th National Conference on Housing in America

January 1920, the U.S. Housing Corporation sold Black Rock Apartments (216 units) and Crane Development (257 units) to the Bridgeport Housing Company as well as a few other properties for $1.3 million. On December 10, 1920, the Eighth National Conference on Housing in America arranged for an Automobile Tour of points of interest in Bridgeport and included Seaside Village. It is in this pamphlet that reference is made to a creek and cove that had previously existed on the land. “Burnham Street was originally a creek used by the sportsmen of Bridgeport as a storage place for boats in which they went out on the meadows to shoot water fowls. Albert Square was formerly a cove in this inlet and was laid out so as to avoid bad foundation and furnish a breathing space in the village. The site of this village for years as a dump used by the City and by the Crane Company for their foundry material and shows the possibility of reclaiming land for housing purposes.”

On December 20, 1922, The Bridgeport Times, wrote an article about how attractive the Seaside Village homes are and that there was a model home open to the public at the corner of Burnham and Iranistan. It mentions that there are kitchen cabinets and ranges that come with the units, which was not typical at that time. The house was heated by a one pipe furnace. It did not state the fuel type, which was likely coal, given the time period.
The Bridgeport Housing Company was renting units for $22 to $24 per month for the 3 room units and $26 to $28.50 per month for the 4 room units.

By 1934, Seaside Village had endured the Great Depression. It still consisted of just rental units at this time, but there had not been a vacancy in five years. It was believed the desirability was due to its proximity to Seaside Park, the “excellent neighborhood”, atmosphere of trees and shrubbery, as well as the brick buildings with slate roofs.

== Seaside Village 1950–present ==
Bridgeport Housing sold Seaside Village along with four other developments to the Farm Bureau Insurance Group in February 1954. In September 1954, tenants accepted a cooperative ownership plan which was offered to them by the Farm Bureau. This was the first privately owned housing co-operative in Connecticut. Each of the five developments (Seaside Village, Bridgeport Park Apartments, Bridgeport Garden Apartments, Bridgeport Wilmot Apartments, and Bridgeport Gateway Apartments) had their own President and Board of Directors elected by their leaseholders. The average sales price was $3,280. Terms were 20% down with the balance paid over 20 years at five percent interest. The average monthly payment was $18 for the mortgage and $22 for the common charges. In October 1954, Seaside Village installed gas furnaces in the basements of nearly all of the units. The common charges went up $5 per month for the units that converted to gas heat.

In 1957 a unit came on the market for $4,200. The common charges were $45 per month. In the 1960s units were listed between $3,100 and $8,000. Common charges were $35 to $46 per month. In the 1970s units were listed between $8,500 and $15,500. Common charges were between $35 and $64 per month. In 1973, Seaside Village was given a certificate of beautification for the "continued cleanliness and beauty that has prevailed in these homes".

In 1975, there was an article in the newspaper about families in Seaside Village burning their 20-year mortgages, which were obtained when the co-op was formed in 1954. Villagers celebrated with a day-long picnic at the Village's Little League field. On September 26, 1990, Seaside Village was officially listed on the National Register of Historic Places as the “Seaside Village Historic District.” It was stated that “alterations to this complex are slight” and goes on to cite the oriel windows, 6/6 windows topped by brick arches, wood shutters, various classically inspired door surrounds, with a predominant theme of Tuscan Doric. “While the steep pitches of the roofs represent an attempt to adapt an early eighteenth-century southern form to a northern climate, the careful massing of the buildings, their Colonial Revival design vocabulary, and studied placement along picturesque, tree-lined streets all consciously recall Old New England villages, where outbuildings and extensions have been added over time to the original house.” They also stated that it “survives with surprising architectural integrity as the last of four U.S. Housing Corporation projects in Bridgeport.”

== Resiliency ==
The Seaside Village Sustainable Master Plan consists of a 77-page document published by the Yale Urban Design Workshop and Urban Ecology and Design Lab on December 12, 2011.

The city was awarded $10 million for planning, design, and construction via the federal government's Rebuild by Design competition. Arcadis, which had been advising Bridgeport on resilience since 2014, helped the city secure another $41 million in funding through HUD's National Disaster Resilience competition for 2015–16. Construction should begin in the spring of 2019 and be completed in the fall of 2022. Projects include a $6.5 million storm-water system and a 2.5-acre storm-water park to manage water runoff along Iranistan.

The rain garden area consists of six experimental rain gardens, approximately 8’ x 22’, which receive runoff from the community parking lot via a series of pipes. A few feet below the ground surface, an impermeable clay layer confines underlying groundwater—but in each rain garden, a permeable sand wick perforates the clay. The initial (2011, 2012) wetland plant community failed due to inundation with storm surge from Long Island Sound, brought by Hurricane Sandy in 2012. The most recent replanting event (in 2013) used only salt-tolerant native New England marsh species.

Seaside Village endured two catastrophic floods within a 14-month period with Irene in 2011 and Sandy in 2012. Hurricane Irene's 3-foot storm surge left behind more than $600,000 in damages. Sandy's 9-foot storm surge was worse than Irene, destroying mechanicals in basements that had been replaced a year before after Irene and reaching units that had not been affected by Irene. Approximately 140 units benefited from the installation of new electrical panels raised to the first level, sump pumps and other work to help make their units more resilient in future storms thanks to grants from the Robin Hood Relief Fund, United Way, and other funders.

In 2014, the Seaside Village Garden Committee decided to build a community garden with raised beds for vegetable production as well as a fenced-in dog run.

Yale's Master Plan said:

Seaside Village is a jewel in the crown of a proud old industrial city. Not only is it a survivor from a crucial period in the urban and industrial history of Bridgeport, it is a significant and widely known landmark in the history of American housing and community design. While much of the economic, institutional and architectural fabric of the era it represents has lost its purpose and declined or disappeared, Seaside Village is a thriving community whose population has transitioned from factory workers to a diverse group of mixed-income residents, devoted to both the heritage and the current life of the Village.

Seaside Village was originally developed on reclaimed marshland and tidal creeks near Long Island Sound, it faces modern challenges related to sea level rise and severe coastal storms, such as Hurricane Sandy in 2012.

Construction of Seaside Village
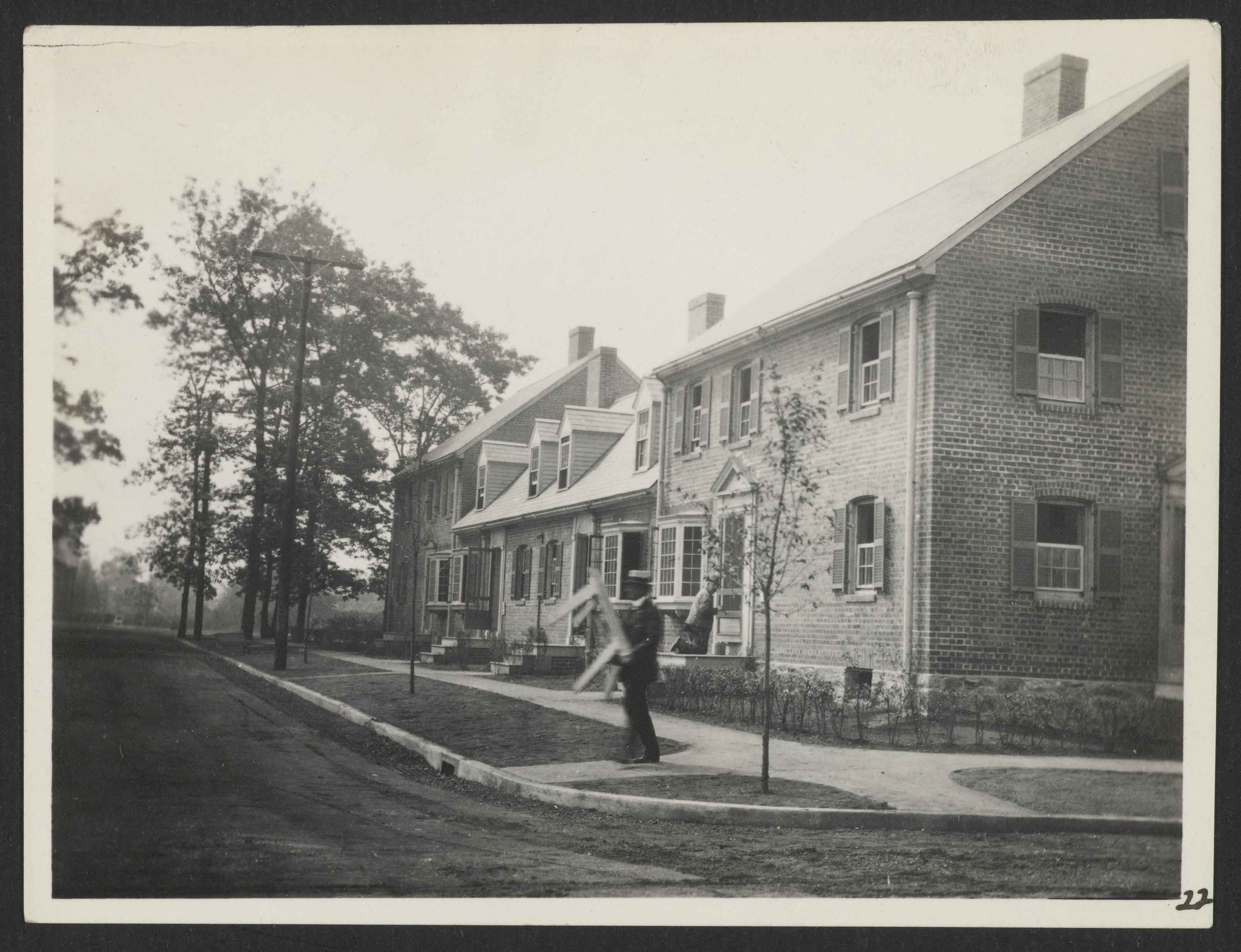
Seaside Village Construction 1918 – Papers of Arthur Shurcliff and Sidney Shurcliff. Folder C018. Special Collections, Frances Loeb Library, Graduate School of Design, Harvard University.

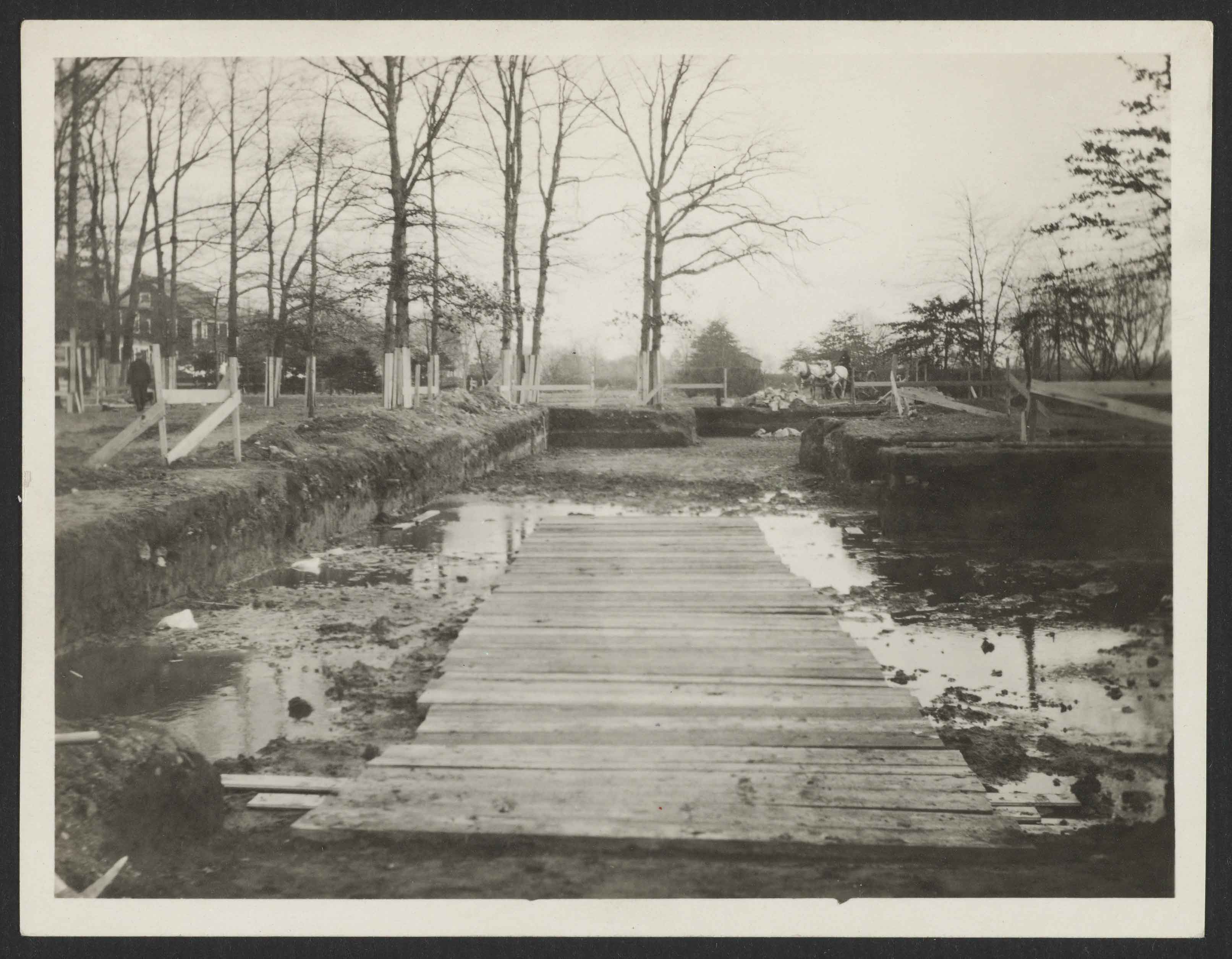
Seaside Village Construction 1918 – Papers of Arthur Shurcliff and Sidney Shurcliff. Folder C018. Special Collections, Frances Loeb Library, Graduate School of Design, Harvard University.

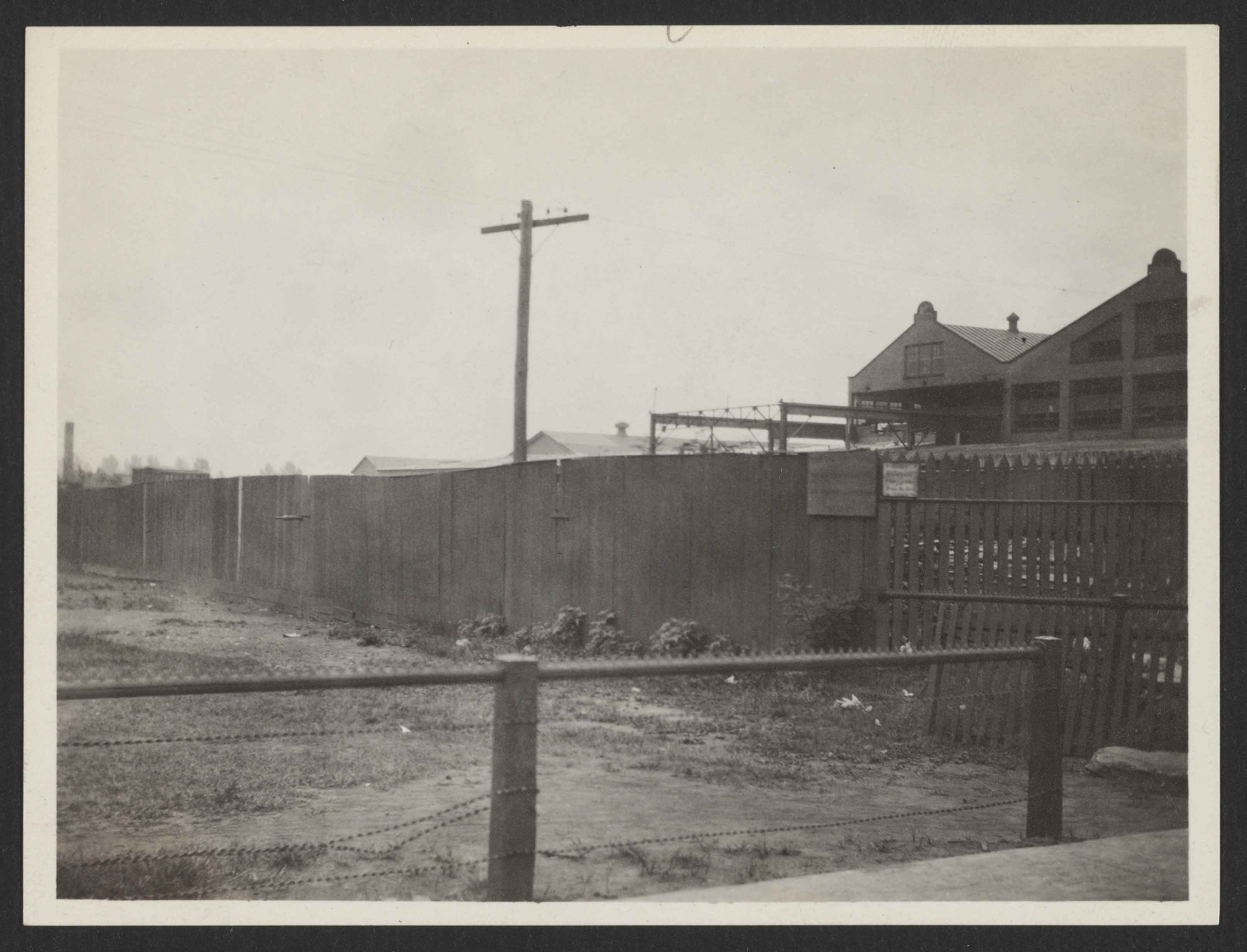
Seaside Village Construction 1918 – Papers of Arthur Shurcliff and Sidney Shurcliff. Folder C018. Special Collections, Frances Loeb Library, Graduate School of Design, Harvard University.

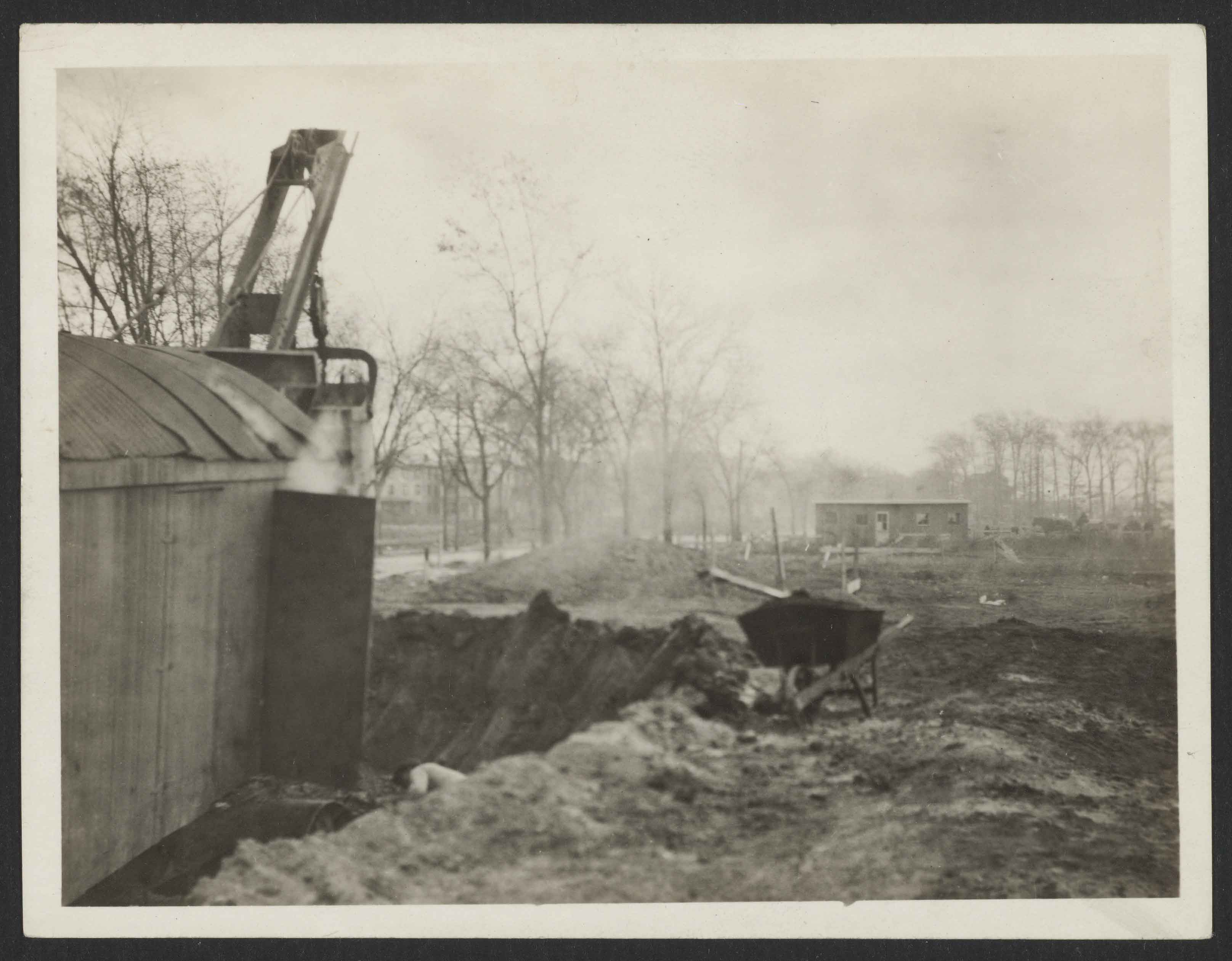
Seaside Village Construction 1918 – Papers of Arthur Shurcliff and Sidney Shurcliff. Folder C018. Special Collections, Frances Loeb Library, Graduate School of Design, Harvard University.

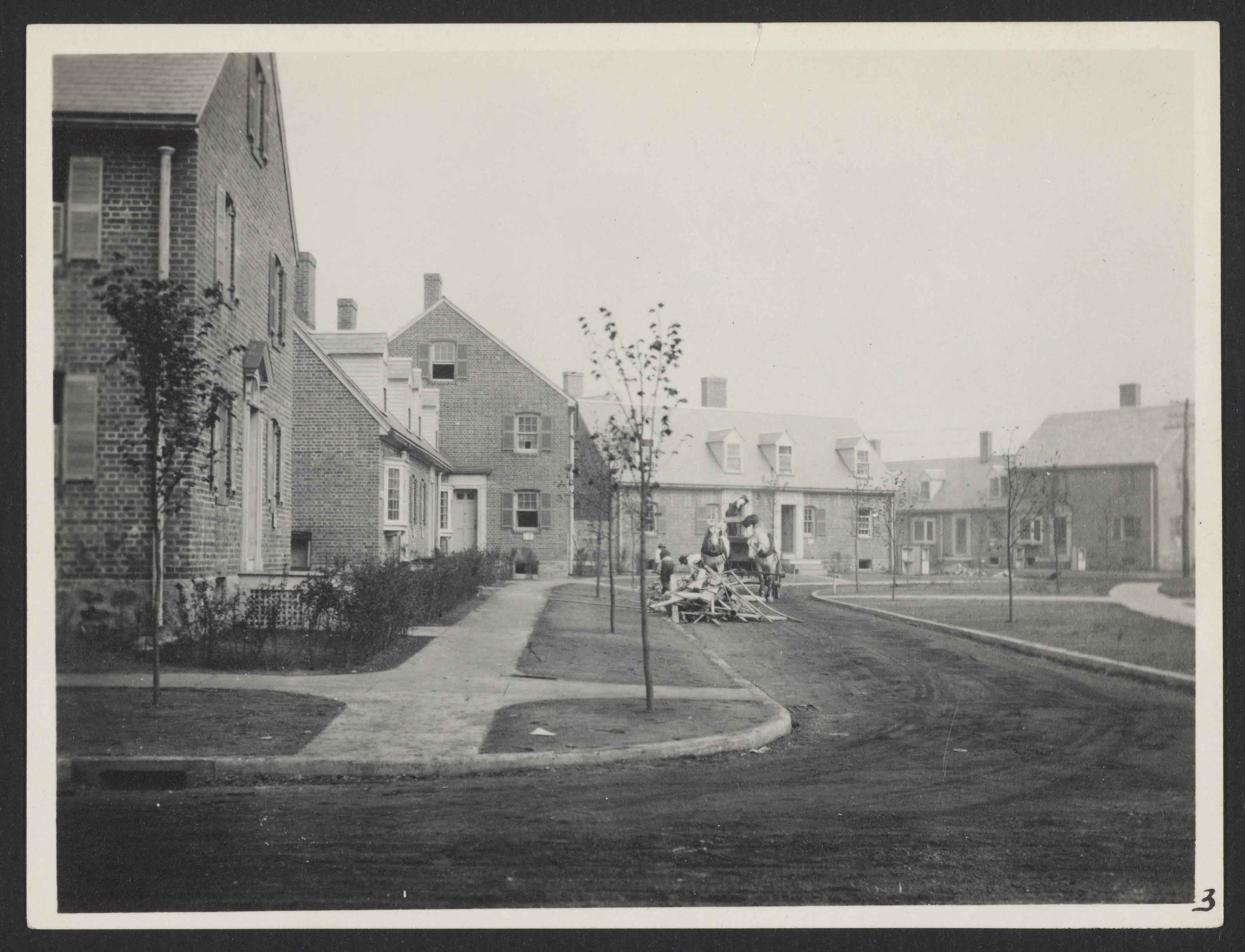
Seaside Village Construction 1918 – Papers of Arthur Shurcliff and Sidney Shurcliff. Folder C018. Special Collections, Frances Loeb Library, Graduate School of Design, Harvard University.

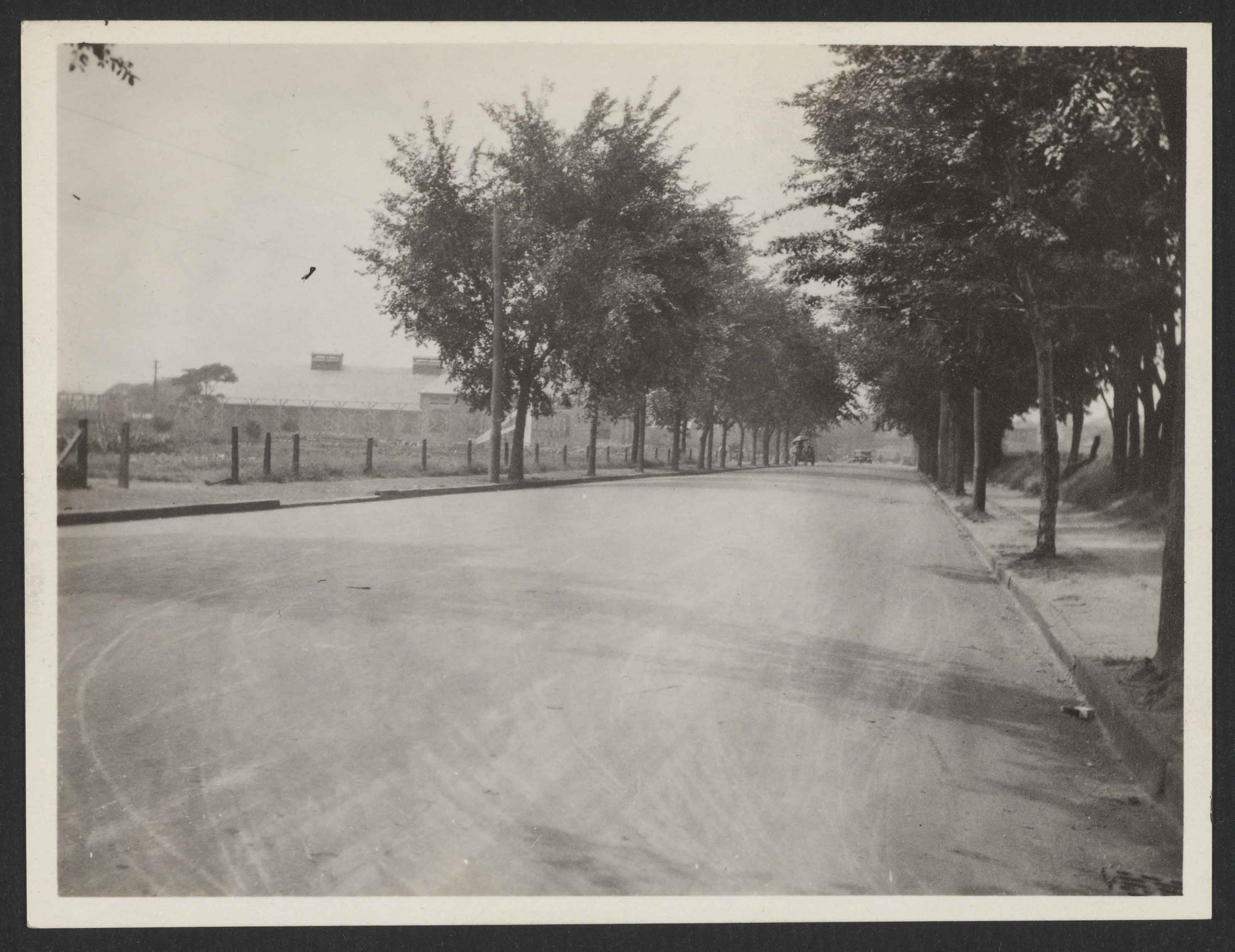
Seaside Village Construction 1918 – Papers of Arthur Shurcliff and Sidney Shurcliff. Folder C018. Special Collections, Frances Loeb Library, Graduate School of Design, Harvard University.

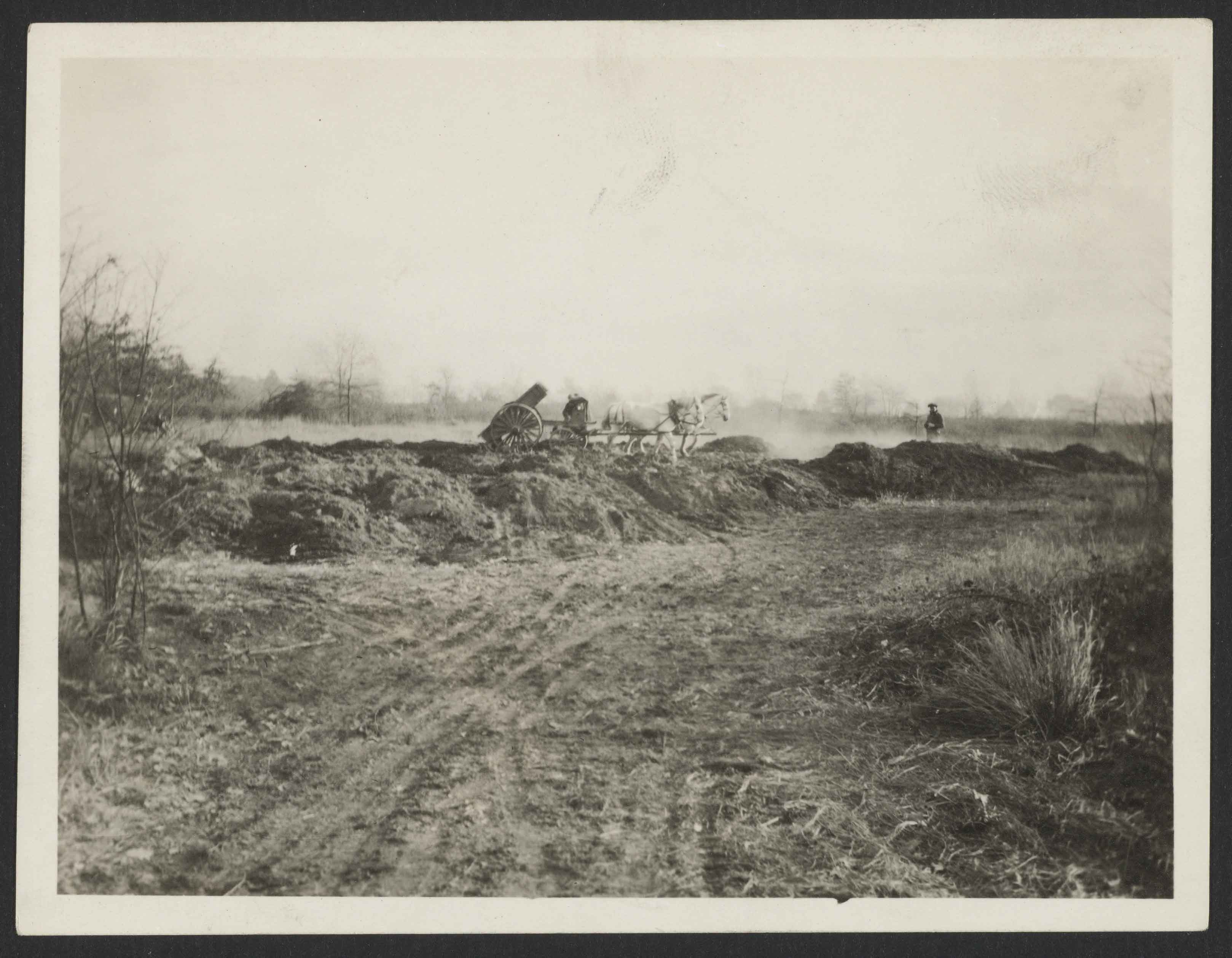
Seaside Village Construction 1918 – Papers of Arthur Shurcliff and Sidney Shurcliff. Folder C018. Special Collections, Frances Loeb Library, Graduate School of Design, Harvard University.

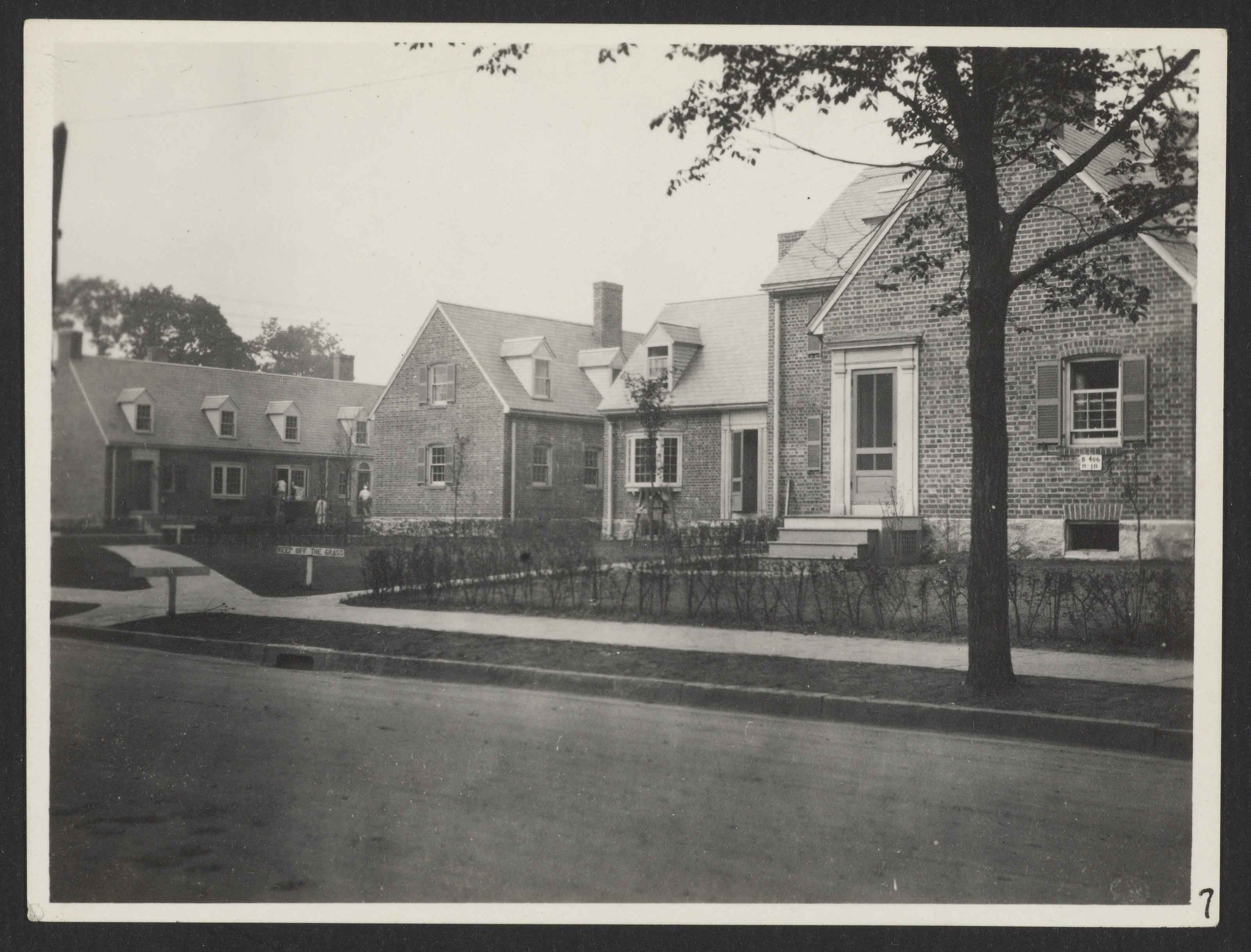
Seaside Village Construction 1918 – Papers of Arthur Shurcliff and Sidney Shurcliff. Folder C018. Special Collections, Frances Loeb Library, Graduate School of Design, Harvard University.

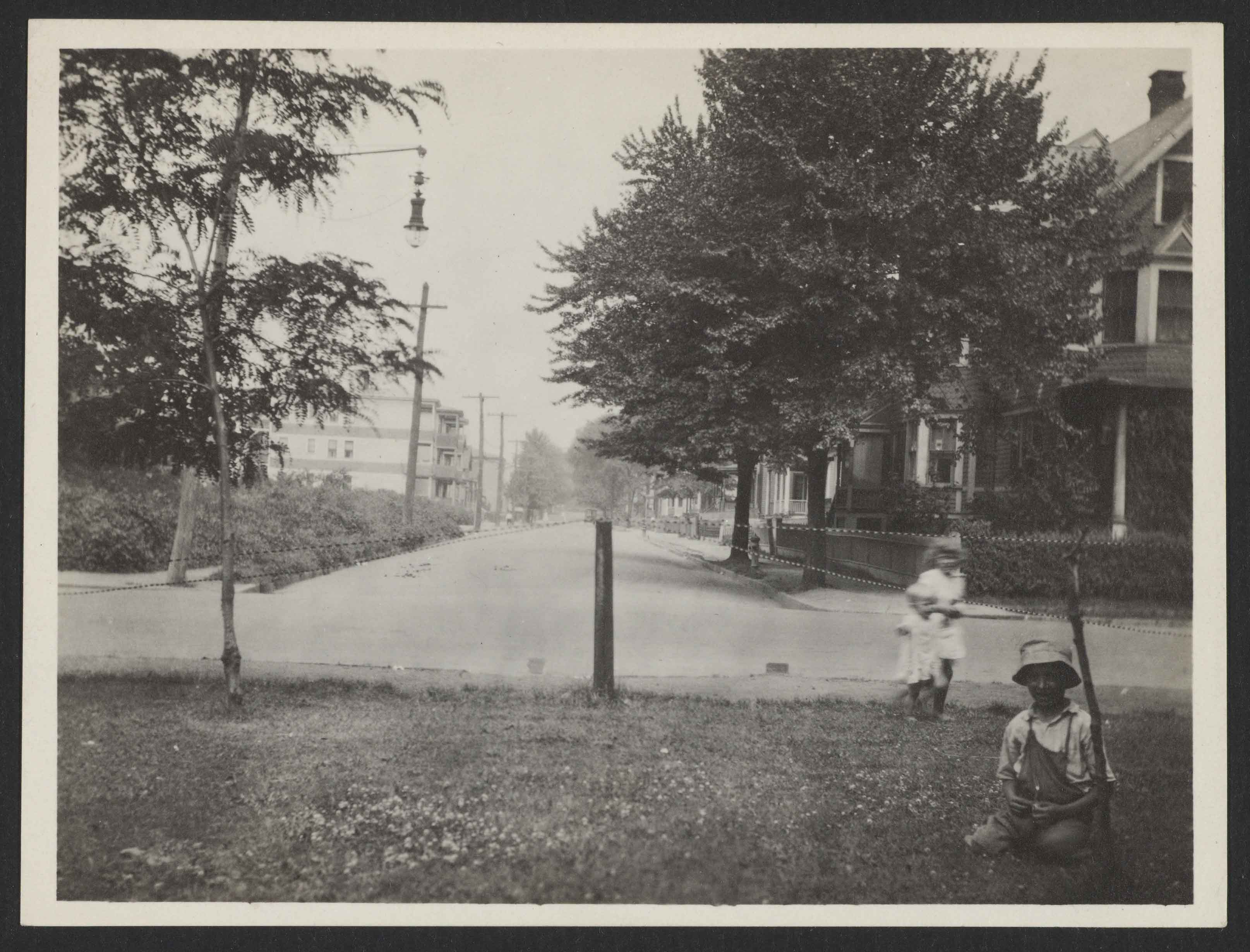
Seaside Village Construction 1918 – Papers of Arthur Shurcliff and Sidney Shurcliff. Folder C018. Special Collections, Frances Loeb Library, Graduate School of Design, Harvard University.

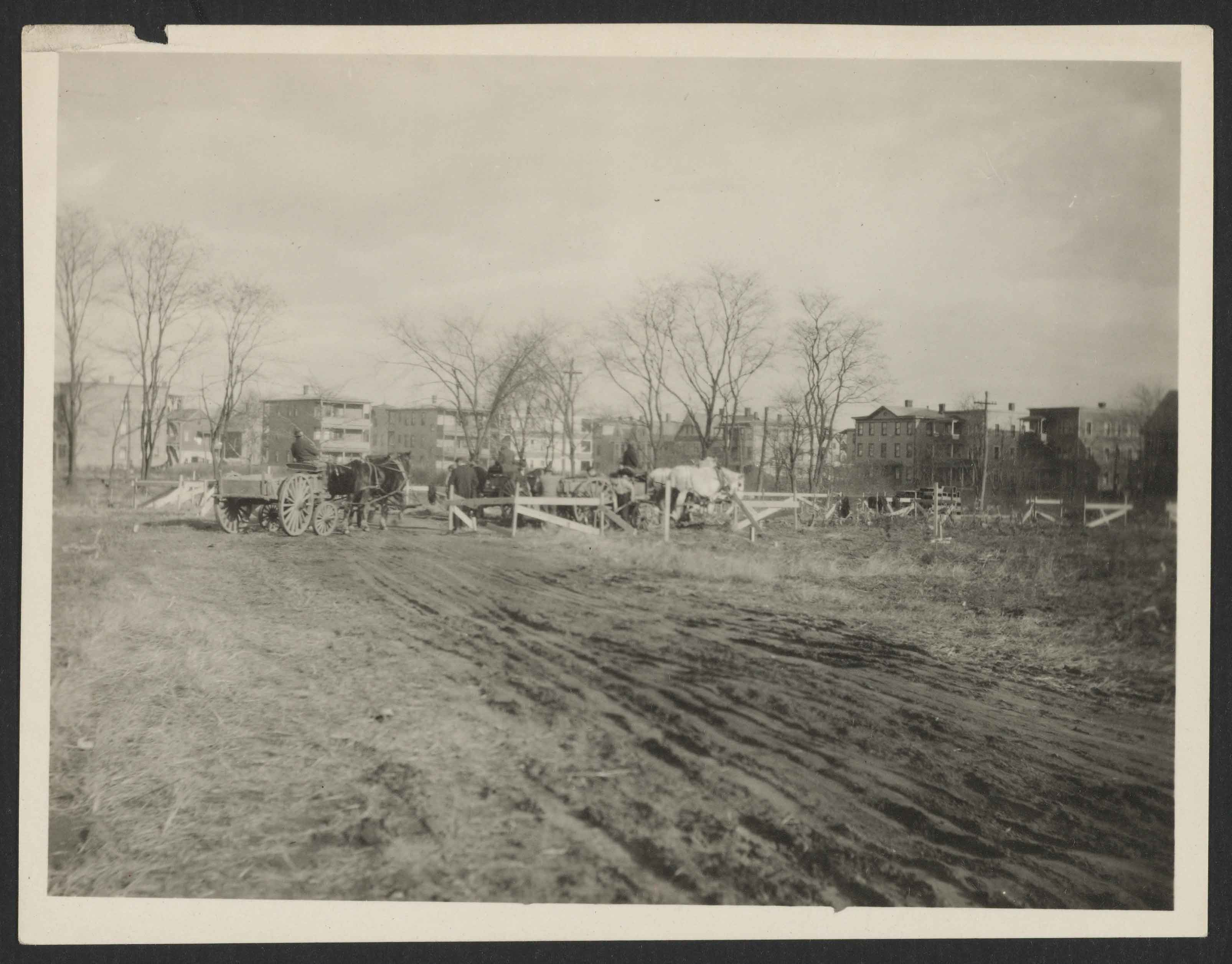
Seaside Village Construction 1918 – Papers of Arthur Shurcliff and Sidney Shurcliff. Folder C018. Special Collections, Frances Loeb Library, Graduate School of Design, Harvard University.
Seaside Village
