= List of bulk carriers =

This is a list of bulk carriers, both those in service and those which have ceased to operate. Bulk carriers are a type of cargo ship that transports unpackaged bulk cargo. For ships that have sailed under multiple names, their most recent name is used and former names are listed in the Notes section.

== Bulk carriers ==
Name	Image	Type	Country	Owner	Year built	Tonnage	Notes	Status
Adriatica			Moldova	Interglobal Shipping 3001	1981		Formerly Marvel K	Sank in the Mediterranean on 12 December 2010
Antenor			United Kingdom	Alfred Holt and Company	1972	16,128		Scrapped in Chittagong in 2001
Apollo Sea			China	CP Ships	1973	69,904	Caused a major oil spill	Sank off Cape Town in June 1994
Banglar Samriddhi		LR-class	Bangladesh	Bangladesh Shipping Corporation	2018	25,818	Damaged during the 2022 Russian invasion of Ukraine	Abandoned in Ukraine
Birgo			Norway	Sameiet Birgo	1967	880		Scuttled for insurance fraud in July 1978
Danica White			Denmark	Partrederiet Invest Vi	1985	997	Hijacked by Somali pirates in June 2007	
Delight		Grain carrier	Hong Kong	Starry Shine International	1985		Hijacked by Somali pirates in November 2008	Scrapped
Federal Rideau			Marshall Islands	Fednav	2000	20,659		In operation
Kuzma Minin			Russia	Murmansk Shipping Company	1980			Scrapped 3 June 2020
Matros Pozynich			Russia	Wakoh Panama SA	2010	17,025	Previously Shunwa, Tramontana	In operation
Mount Norefjell		Newcastlemax	Liberia	Himalaya Shipping	2022	210,000		In operation
Nunavik			Marshall Islands	Fednav	2012	22,622		In operation
Tundra			Cyprus	Navarone SA	2009	30,930		In operation
Umiak I			Canada	Fednav	2006	22,462		In operation
U-Sea Saskatchewan			Canada	Seavance Shipping	2010	34,795		In operation
Yasa Jupiter			Turkey	Mirror Ventures S.A.	2019	34,508	Damaged during the 2022 Russian invasion of Ukraine	In operation
Zhibek Zholy			Russia	KTZ Express JSC	2016	5,686		In operation

== Panamax ==
Panamax

Name	Image	Type	Country	Owner	Year built	Tonnage	Notes	Status
CSL Tecumseh		Trillium-class	Bahamas	Canada Steamship Lines	2012	43,691		In operation
Namura Queen			Japan	Nissen Kaiun	2020	47,146	Damaged during the 2022 Russian invasion of Ukraine	In operation
U-Sea Colonsay			Canada	Seavance Shipping	2011	34,778		In operation

== Lake freighters ==
Lake freighters

Name	Image	Country	Owner	Year built	Tonnage	Notes	Status
Algogulf		Canada	Algoma Central	1961	17,592	Formerly J.N. McWatters, Scott Misener	Scrapped at Port Colborne in 2002
Algorail		Canada	Algoma Central	1967	16,157		Scrapped at Port Colborne in 2018
Algolake		Canada	Algoma Central	1977	22,851		Sold for scrapping 2018
Algosoo		Canada	Algoma Central	1975	21,716		Scrapped at Port Colborne in 2016
Algosteel		Canada	Algoma Central	1966	17,955	Formerly A.S. Glossbrenner, Algogulf	Scrapped in Turkey in 2018
Algoma Buffalo		Canada	Algoma Central	1978	11,619	Formerly Buffalo	In operation
Algoma Compass		Canada	Algoma Central	1973	18,639	Formerly Roger M.Kyes, Adam E. Cornelius	In operation
Algoma Equinox		Canada	Algoma Central	2012	23,895		In operation
Algoma Mariner		Canada	Algoma Central	2011	24,535		In operation
Algoma Progress		Canada	Algoma Central	1968	21,436	Formerly Canadian Progress	Broken up 2014
Arthur M. Anderson		United States	The Great lakes Fleet	1952	26,525		In operation
American Century		United States	American Steamship Company	1981	35,923	Formerly Columbia Star	In operation
American Courage		United States	Grand River Navigation	1978	11,688	Formerly Fred R. White Jr	In operation
American Integrity		United States	American Steamship Company	1978	35,652	Formerly Lewis Wilson Foy, Oglebay Norton	In operation
American Mariner		United States	Grand River Navigation	1979	15,396		In operation
Argus		United States	Interlake Steamship Company	1905	4,707	Formerly Lewis Woodruff	Sank in the Great Lakes Storm of 1913
Appomattox		United States	Boston Coal Dock & Wharf Company	1896	2,643		Ran aground and sank on November 2, 1905
Augustus B. Wolvin		United States	Labrador Steamship Company	1904	6,585		Scrapped in Santander, Spain in 1967
Baie Comeu		Canada	Canadian Steamship Line	2013	24,430		In operation
Baie St Paul		Canada	Canadian Steamship Line	2012	24,430		In operation
Burns Harbor		United States	American Steamship Company	1980	35,652		In operation
Carl D. Bradley		United States	U.S. Steel	1927	10,028		Sank in a storm on November 18, 1958
Cedarville		United States	U.S. Steel	1927	8,575	Formerly A.F. Harvey	Sank after a collision on May 7, 1965
Charles S. Price		United States	Interlake Steamship Company	1910	6,322		Sank in the Great Lakes Storm of 1913
Chester A. Congdon		United States	Continental Steamship Company	1907	6,530	Formerly Salt Lake City	Ran aground and sank November 5, 1918
CSL Tadoussac		Canada	Canadian Steamship Line	1969	20,634		In operation
D. R. Hanna		United States	Pioneer Steamship Company	1906	7,023		Rammed by the steamer Quincy A. Shaw on May 16, 1919.
Daniel J. Morrell		United States	Bethlehem Transportation Company	1906	7,239		Sank in a storm on November 29, 1966
D.G. Kerr		United States	Provident Steamship Company	1903			Sank on way to be scrapped in 1960
Edward L. Ryerson		United States	Inland Steamship management	1960	12,170		Laid up in Superior Wisconsin since 2009
Edmund Fitzgerald		United States	Columbia Transportation Division	1958	13,632		Sank on November 10, 1975
Edwin H. Gott		United States	The Great Lakes Fleet	1979	35,592		In operation
Emperor		Canada	Canada Steamship Lines	1911	7,031		Ran aground and sank at Isle Royale on June 4, 1947.
Henry B. Smith		United States	Acme Transit Company	1906	6,631		Sank in the Great Lakes Storm of 1913
Henry Steinbrenner		United States	Kinsman Transit Co.	1901			Sank on May 11, 1953.
Hesper		United States	Ship Owners Dry Dock Company	1890	1,540		Sank on May 4, 1905
H Lee. White		United States	Grand River Navigation	1974	14,449		In operation
Hydrus		United States	Interlake Steamship Company	1903	4,713	Formerly R.E. Schuck	Sank in the Great Lakes Storm of 1913
Indiana Harbor		United States	American Steamship Company	1979	35,923		In operation
Isaac M. Scott		United States	Virginia Steamship Co.	1909	6,372		Sank in the Great Lakes Storm of 1913
James Carruthers		Canada	St. Lawrence & Chicago Steam and Navigation Company	1913	7,862		Sank in the Great Lakes Storm of 1913
James R. Barker		United States	Interlake Steamship Company	1976	34,728		In operation
John A. McGeen		United States	Hutchinson & Company	1908	5,100		Sank in Great Lakes storm of 1913
John J. Boland		United States	Grand River Navigation	1973	13,862	Formerly Charles E. Wilson	In operation
Kaye E. Barker		United States	Interlake Steamship Company	1952	11,726	Formerly Edward B Greene, Benson Ford (II)	In operation
Lafayette		United States	Pittsburgh Steamship Company	1900	5,113		Sank in the Mataafa Storm.
Leafield		Canada	Strand Stepway Company	1892	1,452		Sank in the Great Lakes storm of 1913
Lee A. Tregurtha		United States	Interlake Steamship Company	1942	14,671	Formerly USS Chiwawa, Walter A. Sterling, William Clay Ford. originally built as a US Navy tanker	In operation
Louisiana		United States		1887			Ran aground and burned in the Great Lakes Storm of 1913.
Mark W. Barker		United States	Interlake Steamship Company	2022	26,000		In Operation
Mesabi Miner		United States	Interlake Steamship Company	1977	34,729		In operation
Mississagi		Canada	Lower Lakes Towing	1943	15,336	Formerly Hill Annex, George A. Sloan	Scrapped at Sault Ste Marie in 2021
Michipicoten		Canada	Lower Lakes Towing	1952	15,336	Formerly Elton Hoyt II	In operation
Parkdale		United Kingdom	Redwood Enterprises Ltd	1916		Formerly Sir Trevor Dawson, Charles L. Hutchinson, Gene C. Hutchinson	Scrapped in Cartagena, Spain in 1980
Paul R. Tregurtha		United States	Interlake Steamship Company	1981	36,360	Formerly Willam J. Delancey largest lake freighter ever built	In operation
R. J. Hackett		United States	Vulcan Transportation Company	1869	1,129	First lake freighter	Burned and sank on November 12, 1905
Radcliffe R. Latimer		Canada	Algoma Central	1978	22,465	Formerly Algobay, Atlantic Trader	In operation
Regina		Canada	Canadian Steamship Lines	1907	1,956		Sank in the Great Lakes Storm of 1913
Roger Blough		United States	The Great Lakes fleet	1972	22,041		Laid up in sturgeon Bay Wisconsin after a fire in 2021
Saginaw		Canada	Lower Lakes Towing	1953	12,557	Formerly John J. Boland	In operation
Sam Laud		United States	Grand River Navigation	1973	11,619		In operation
Scotiadoc		Canada	Paterson Steamships, Ltd	1904	4,432	Formerly Martin Mullen	Sank after being rammed by the freighter Burlington in a storm on June 20, 1953.
Tim S. Dool		Canada	Algoma Central	1967	18,845	Formerly Senneville, Algoville	In operation
Thunder Bay		Canada	Canadian Steamship Line	2013	24,300		In operation
Walter J. McCarthy Jr		United States	American Steamship Company	1977	35,923		In operation
Wexford		France	Western Steamship Company	1888	2,077		Sank in the Great Lakes storm of 1913
William B. Davock		United States	Vulcan Steamship Company	1907	4,468		Foundered on Lake Michigan on November 11, 1940
William C. Moreland		United States	Interstate Steamship Company	1910	7,514	The stern of the Moreland was salvaged and reused as the stern of the Sir Trevor Dawson.	Ran aground and sank on Sawtooth Reef October 18, 1910
Whitefish bay		Canada	Canadian Steamship Line	2012	24,300		In operation

== Ore-bulk-oil carriers ==
Ore-bulk-oil carriers (OBO)

Name	Image	Type	Country	Owner	Year built	Tonnage	Notes	Status
Arctic			Canada	Fednav	1978	19,420	Has a special bow for ice breaking	Scrapped at Aliaga in April 2021
Berge Istra			Liberia	Sig.ö Bergesen d.y.	1972			Disappeared in the Pacific on 30 December 1975
Berge Vanga			Liberia	Sig.ö Bergesen d.y.	1974	115,426		Disappeared in the South Atlantic on 29 October 1979
Derbyshire		Bridge-class	United Kingdom	Bibby Line	1976	91,655	Previously Liverpool Bridge	Lost with all hands on 9 September 1980 during Typhoon Orchid
Kowloon Bridge		Bridge-class	Hong Kong	Helinger	1972	89,438	Previously English Bridge	Wrecked off Ireland in December 1986

== Very large ore carriers ==
Very large ore carriers (VLOC)

Name	Image	Type	Country	Owner	Year built	Tonnage	Notes	Status
Berge Fjord				BW Fleet Management	1985	159,534	Previously Docefjord	Scrapped 18 February 2017
Berge Stahl		Valemax	Comoros	Berge Bulk	1986	175,720	Largest bulk carrier in the world until 2011	Scrapped at Gadani in July 2020
Ore Brasil		Valemax	Singapore	Vale Shipping Holding Pte. Ltd.	2011	198,980	Previously Vale Brasil	In operation
Stellar Daisy			South Korea	VP-14 Shipping Inc	1993	148,431	Largest ship to be lost at sea	Sank in the South Atlantic on 31 March 2017
Vale Rio de Janeiro		Valemax	Singapore	Vale Shipping Holding Pte. Ltd.	2011	198,980		In operation

== Strategic sealift bulk carriers ==
Strategic sealift ships are cargo ships operated by the United States Navy's Military Sealift Command. Those ships which are dry cargo/ammunition ships (T-AKE and T-AK) and considered bulk carriers are listed here.

Name	Hull number	Image	Class	Year built	Tonnage	Notes	Status
USNS Lewis and Clark	T-AKE-1		Lewis and Clark	2005	41,000		In operation
USNS Sacagawea	T-AKE-2		Lewis and Clark	2006	40,298		In operation
USNS Alan Shepard	T-AKE-3		Lewis and Clark	2006	40,298		In operation
USNS Richard E. Byrd	T-AKE-4		Lewis and Clark	2007	40,298		In operation
USNS Robert E. Peary	T-AKE-5		Lewis and Clark	2007	40,298		In operation
USNS Amelia Earhart	T-AKE-6		Lewis and Clark	2008	40,298		In operation
USNS Carl Brashear	T-AKE-7		Lewis and Clark	2008	40,298		In operation
USNS Wally Schirra	T-AKE-8		Lewis and Clark	2009	40,298		In operation
USNS Matthew Perry	T-AKE-9		Lewis and Clark	2009	40,298		In operation
USNS Charles Drew	T-AKE-10		Lewis and Clark	2010	40,298		In operation
USNS Washington Chambers	T-AKE-11		Lewis and Clark	2010	40,298		In operation
USNS William McLean	T-AKE-12		Lewis and Clark	2011	40,298		In operation
USNS Medgar Evers	T-AKE-13		Lewis and Clark	2011	40,298		In operation
USNS Cesar Chavez	T-AKE-14		Lewis and Clark	2012	40,298		In operation

== See also ==
- Lists of ships
