= SS Brulin =

North American Great Lakes freighter

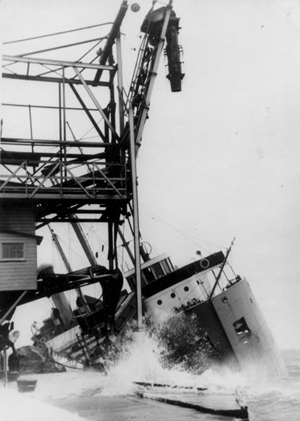
- Efforts to salvage the Outarde in 1946

History
- Name: Brulin (1924-1939); Outarde (1939-1960); James J. Buckler
- Owner: Bruce Lindsay Bros Ltd (1924-1939); Quebec & Ontario Transportation Co Ltd (1939-1960); Buckport Shipping Co Ltd (1960)
- Builder: Palmers Shipbuilding and Iron Company, Hebburn-on-Tyne
- Yard number: 949
- Launched: 31 July 1924
- Completed: August 1924
- Fate: Sank during salvage operations on 16 June 1960

General characteristics
- Type: Cargo ship
- Tonnage: 2,241 GRT; 1,576 NRT
- Length: 248 feet (76 m)
- Beam: 43 feet (13 m)
- Depth: 22 feet 8 inches (6.91 m)
- Installed power: 180 nhp

SS Brulin was a lake freighter that worked the North American Great Lakes routes from 1924 to 1960. She was renamed Outarde in 1939, and James J. Buckler in 1960, shortly before she ran aground and sank during salvage operations. Brulin was built by Palmers Shipbuilding and Iron Company, Hebburn-on-Tyne and launched on 31 July 1924, for the Montreal Forwarding Company. She was built to the maximum dimensions of the canal locks that preceded the St Lawrence Seaway.

== Career ==
She was involved in a number of incidents in her career. In August 1925 she ran aground at the head of the Morrisburg Canal.

On the night of 15 July 1926 she struck and sank the tugboat Emma L, off Windmill Point, killing six of the tugboat's seven crew, and in 1932 she ran aground on Seven Acre Shoal off Kingston Ontario. In 1935 she found the tank barge Bruce Hudson adrift and abandoned on Lake Erie, and was able to collect a salvage fee.

On 15 November 1939 the Brulin collided with the Canadian Steamship Lines' Huronic in a dense fog.

She was renamed Outarde in 1939 when she was sold to the Quebec and Ontario Transportation Company. (In 1962, after her loss, the firm renamed another vessel Outarde.)

In January 1943 she ran aground near the St Pierre and Miquelon near the mouth of the St Lawrence estuary. She was armed with a small cannon during World War II.

On 30 November 1945 a storm smashed the Outarde against the Consul-Hall Coal Dock at Clayton, New York. A coffer-dam needed to be erected to salvage the vessel, and clear the approach to the dock. Salvage took over four months, and repairs to return to service were not completed until June 1946.

When the St Lawrence Seaway was completed, in late 1959, allowing larger vessels to access sail to and from the Great Lakes, the Outarde was scheduled to be scrapped. She was, however, put back into service in 1960 as the James J. Buckler. She ran aground on 13 June 1960, on a sandbank off the mouth of the Saguenay River. Though she was able to be refloated, she was found to have a serious leak, and was beached. A further salvage attempt was made, but on 16 June 1960 her hull cracked in two. She was purposely sunk near Les Bergeronnes, Quebec in November 1960.
