= Pioneer (ship) =

Numerous vessels have been named Pioneer,

- HMS Pioneer, several Royal Navy ships, 1800s
- Pioneer (sidewheeler), one of the first steamboats in California, U.S., 1849
- Pioneer (1863 paddle steamer), New Zealand gunboat, 1863
- PS Pioneer (1905)
- Pioneer (submarine), built for the American Civil War, 1861
- Pioneer (schooner), ship at the South Street Seaport Museum in New York City, U.S., 1885
- MV Pioneer
- USS Pioneer, several U.S. Navy ships, 1800s – 1900s
- USC&GS Pioneer, several U.S. Coast and Geodetic Survey ships, 1900s
- P&O Pioneer, a British hybrid power seagoing ferry, introduced on the Dover–Calais route, 2023
- SS Pioneer, several steamships

== Naval vessels ==
- HMS Pioneer, several vessels
- HMCS Pioneer
- USS Pioneer (1836), a nineteenth-century barque.
- USS Pioneer (1862), may refer to a scuttled Confederate States Navy submarine raised by Union troops or may refer to the Bayou St. John submarine which was for decades misidentified as the Pioneer.
- USS Pioneer (MSF-105), a World War II minesweeper commissioned in 1942 and sold to Mexico in 1973 as Leandro Valle
- USS Pioneer (MCM-9), is an Avenger-class mine countermeasures ship currently in service.

== See also ==
- Pioneer (disambiguation)
- SS Pioneer
