= Baie Comeau (2012 ship) =

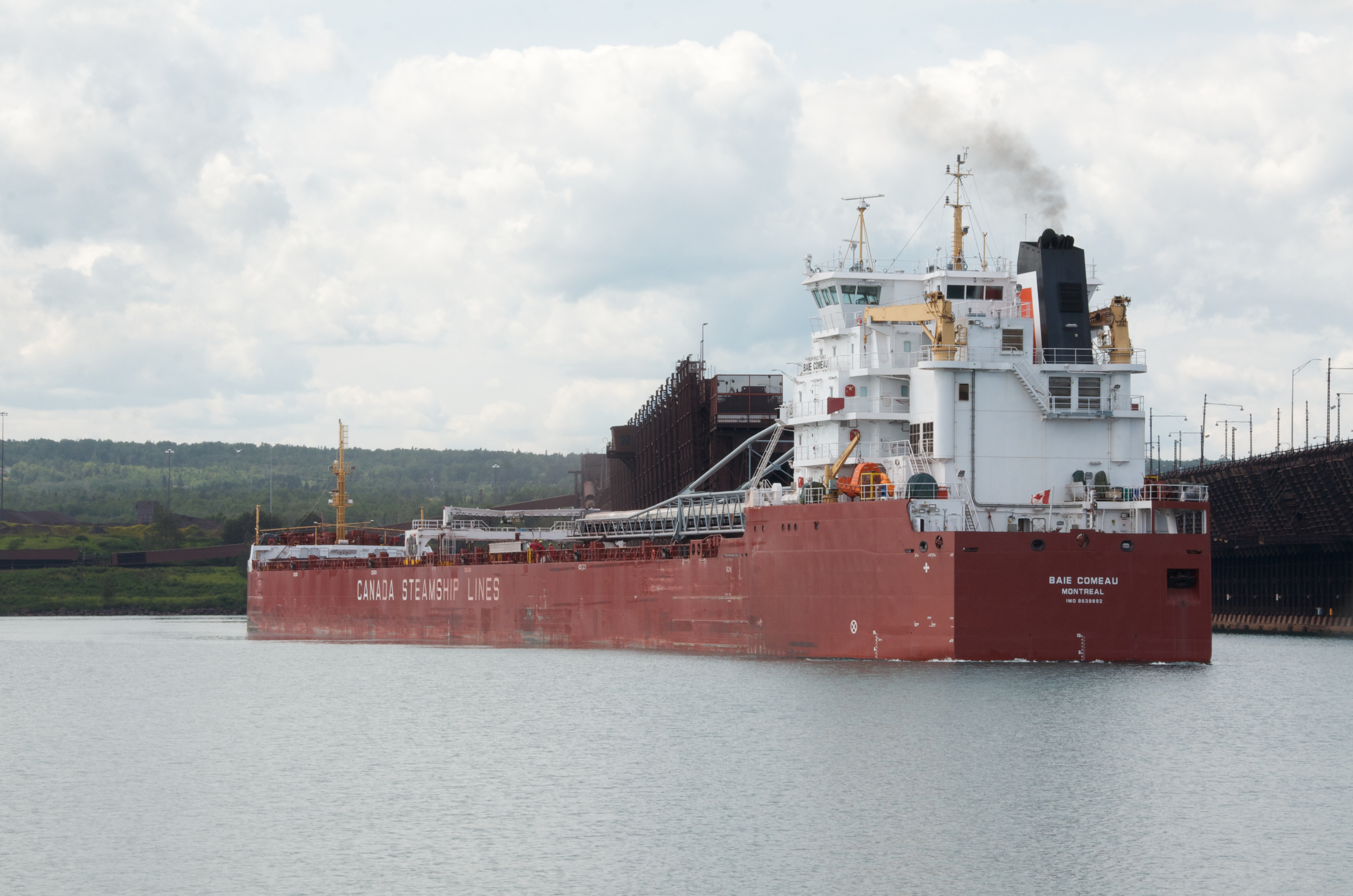
- Baie Comeau leaving Two Harbors, Minnesota

History
- Name: Baie Comeau
- Operator: Canada Steamship Lines
- Port of registry: Canada
- Builder: Chengxi shipyard, Jiangyin
- Yard number: CX9304
- Laid down: 27 July 2012
- Launched: 21 August 2012
- Completed: 20 June 2013
- Identification: IMO number: 9639892; MMSI number: 316023808; Callsign: CFN6357
- Status: In active service

General characteristics
- Class & type: Trillium-class freighter
- Tonnage: 24,430 GT; 34,402 DWT
- Length: 225.5 m (739 ft 10 in)
- Beam: 23.76 m (77 ft 11 in)
- Draught: 9 m (29 ft 6 in)
- Installed power: 1 x IMO Tier III MAN B&W 6S50ME diesel engine, 8,750 kW (11,730 hp)
- Propulsion: 1 shaft

Baie Comeau is the fourth and last self-unloading lake freighter in Canada Steamship Lines (CSL) Trillium class. Like her sister ships, Baie St. Paul, Thunder Bay, and Whitefish Bay she was built in China, being launched in 2012 and entered service in 2013.

== Design and description ==
Baie Comeau is a self-unloading lake freighter in service on the North American Great Lakes and St. Lawrence Seaway. The fourth of the CSL Trillium class, the vessel, according to the Miramar Ship Index, has a gross tonnage (GT) of 32,000 tons and a deadweight tonnage (DWT) of 37,690 tons. However, on the CSL website, the ship is stated as having a GT of 24,430 and DWT of 34,490 tons. While Equasis, the ship registry of the French Ministry of Transport states the gross tonnage of the vessel is 24,430 and the deadweight tonnage is 34,402.

Baie Comeau is 225.5 metres (739 ft 10 in) long overall with a beam of 23.76 metres (77 ft 11 in). Baie Comeau has a maximum draught of 9 metres (29 ft 6 in). The ship is powered by one IMO Tier III MAN B&W 6S50ME diesel engine driving one shaft creating 8,750 kilowatts (11,730 hp). The vessel has a maximum speed of 13 knots (24 km/h; 15 mph). The ship is equipped with five holds and has a net hold capacity of 41,917.96 m^{3} (1,480,319 cu ft). The vessel has an average unloading rate of 5,450 tonnes (5,360 long tons; 6,010 short tons) per hour.

== Construction and career ==
Baie Comeau was constructed at the Chengxi shipyard in Jiangyin, China with the yard number CX9304. The ship was laid down on 27 July 2012 and launched on 21 September later that year. Completed on 20 June 2013, Baie Comeau left China on 30 June, arrived in Montreal, Quebec, on 24 August. The ship is registered in Canada and has the IMO number 9639892.

In an inaugural salute to the completion of its first voyage carrying cargo, Claude Dumais, CSL's vice president of technical operations, presented Christine Brisson, mayor of Baie-Comeau, with an 2.4-metre (7.9 ft) model of the vessel, which will be displayed in the city's municipal offices. In April 2018, a strike by CSL's shipping deck officers led to all of CSL's self-unloading ships being laid up until the strike could be mediated, with Baie Comeau remaining at Thunder Bay, Ontario.

The Quebec & Ontario Transportation Company launched an earlier vessel named Baie Comeau in 1954.
