= Seven Acre Shoal =

Sandbank in Canada

Seven Acre Shoal is a navigational hazard at the east end of Lake Ontario, north of Snake Island, and 9 miles (14 km) west of Kingston, Ontario.

During the War of 1812 the small Upper Canada government schooner Governor Simcoe was able to evade capture by sailing over the shoal, where a pursuing squadron of larger American vessels were too deep to follow. However she was sunk by a cannon salvo prior to entering Kingston's harbour.

The lake freighter Brulin grounded on the shoal in 1932.
