= SS Pioneer =

SS Pioneer is the name of the following ships:

- SS Pioneer (1851), wrecked 18 August 1852
- SS Pioneer (1854), a ship for London, Chatham and Dover Railway
- SS Pioneer (1905), a dredging ship in Australia, scuttled in 1950, now a recreational dive site

== See also ==
- Pioneer (disambiguation)
- United States Lines, many ship names beginning with "Pioneer"
