= Whitefish Bay (2012 ship) =

Great Lakes ship

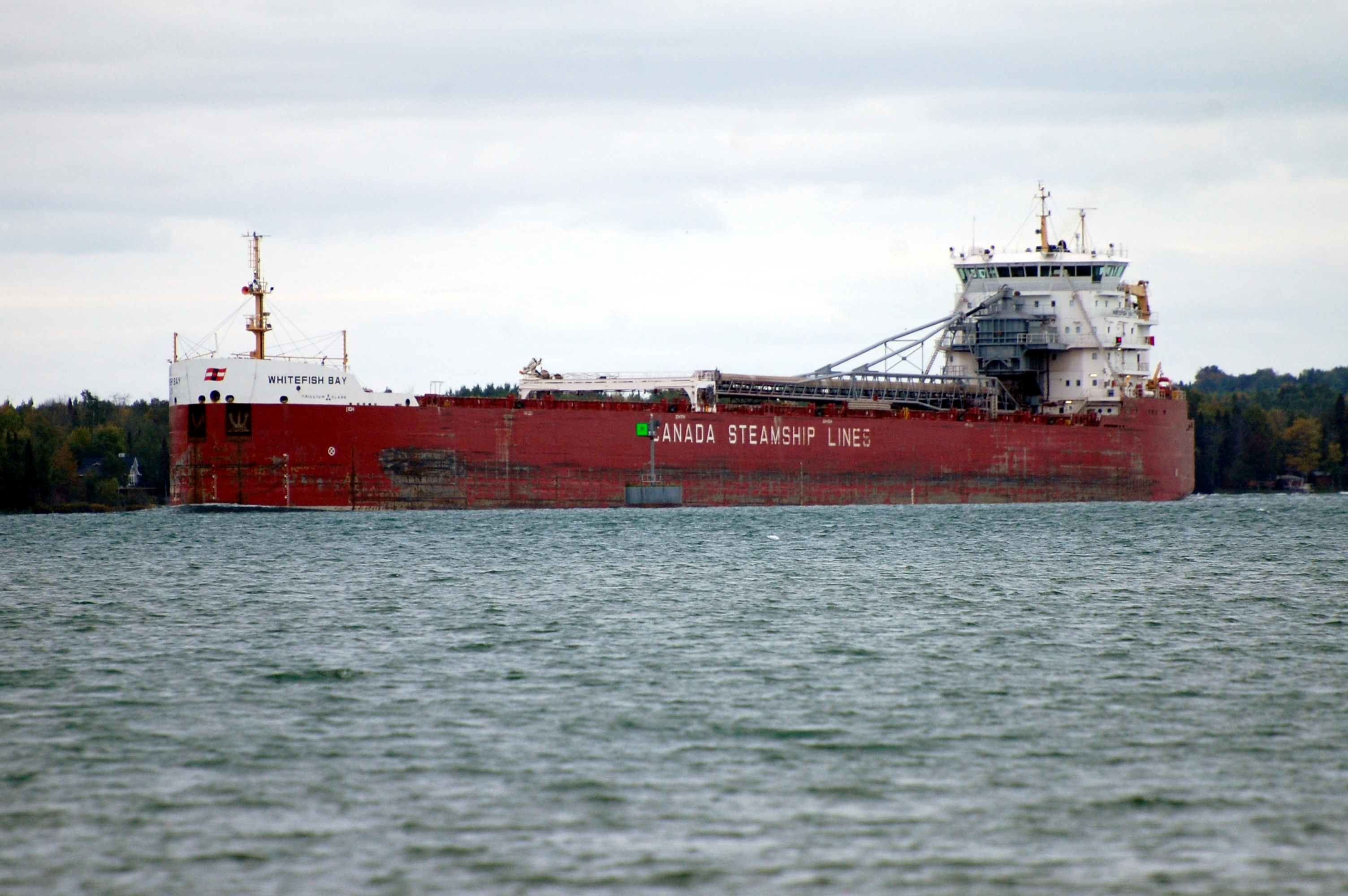
- Whitefish Bay upbound on the St. Marys River in 2019

History
- Name: Whitefish Bay
- Operator: Canada Steamship Lines
- Port of registry: Canada
- Builder: Chengxi shipyard, Jiangyin
- Yard number: 9303
- Laid down: 11 May 2012
- Launched: 23 July 2012
- Completed: 8 May 2013
- In service: 2013
- Identification: IMO number: 9639880
- Status: In active service

General characteristics
- Class & type: Trillium-class freighter
- Tonnage: 24,300 GT; 37,690 DWT
- Length: 225.5 m (739 ft 10 in)
- Beam: 23.76 m (77 ft 11 in)
- Draught: 9 m (29 ft 6 in)
- Installed power: 1 × IMO Tier III MAN B&W 6S50ME diesel engine, 8,750 kW (11,730 hp)
- Propulsion: 1 shaft

Whitefish Bay is a self-unloading lake freighter that entered service with Canada Steamship Lines (CSL) in 2013. Built in China, the vessel is the third of CSL's Trillium-class ships. Her sister ships are Baie Comeau, Baie St. Paul and Thunder Bay. Whitefish Bay is used primarily to transport goods on the North American Great Lakes and the St. Lawrence Seaway.

== Design and description ==
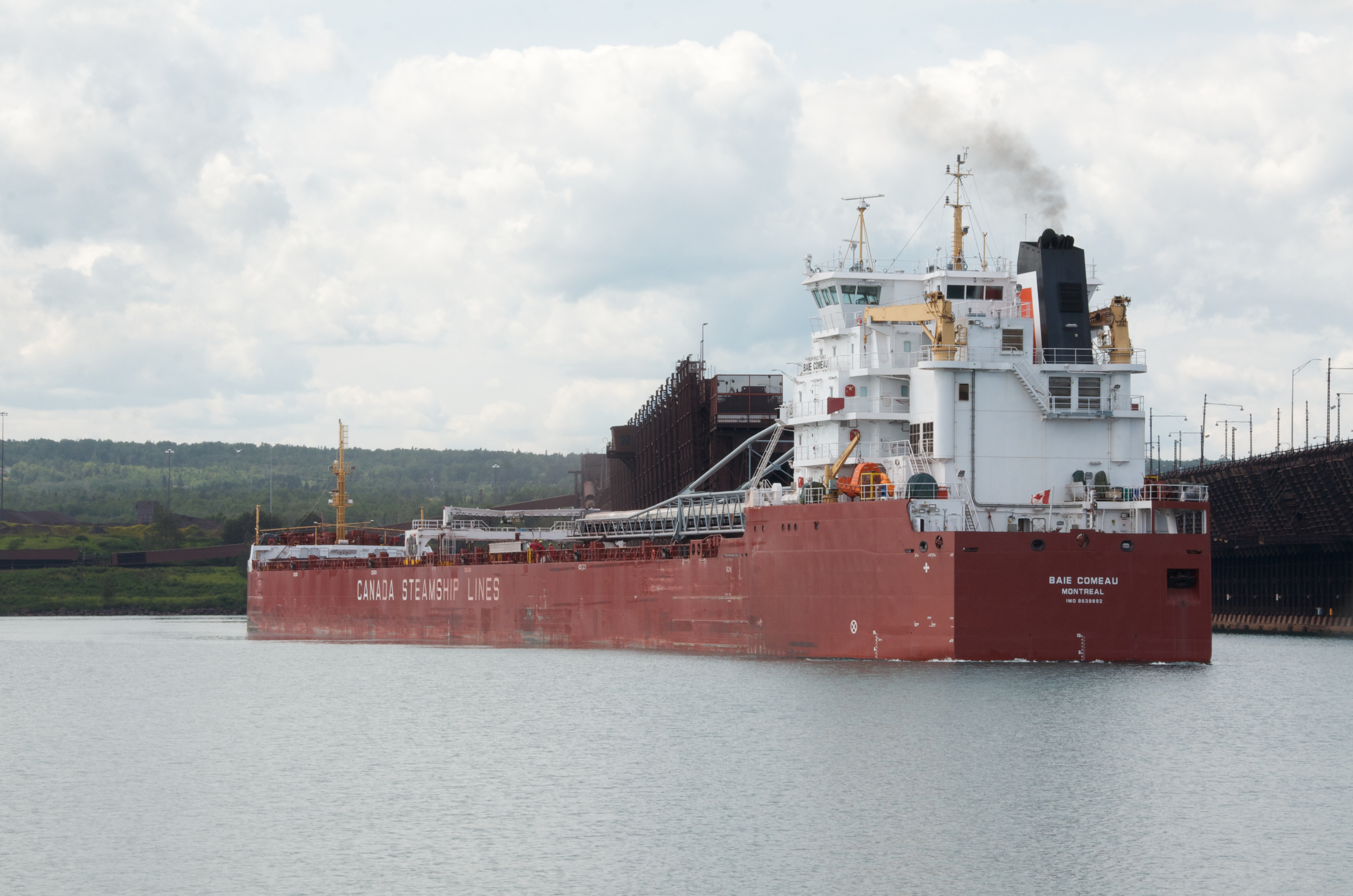
Sister ship Baie Comeau leaving Two Harbors, Minnesota

Whitefish Bay is a self-unloading lake freighter, the third of the Canada Steamship Lines' (CSL) Trillium class. CSL asserts that the new vessels will be more efficient than existing vessels, and will leave less pollution. According to the Miramar Ship Index Whitefish Bay has a 24,430 gross tonnage (GT) and a 37,690 tonnes deadweight (DWT). However, on the CSL website, the ship is stated as having a DWT of 34,500 tons.

Whitefish Bay is 225.5 metres (739 ft 10 in) long overall with a beam of 23.76 metres (77 ft 11 in). Whitefish Bay has a maximum draught of 9 metres (29 ft 6 in). The ship is powered by one IMO Tier III MAN B&W 6S50ME diesel engine driving one shaft creating 8,750 kilowatts (11,730 hp).

The ship is equipped with five holds and has a net hold capacity of 41,917.96 m^{3} (1,480,319 cu ft). The vessel has an average unloading rate of 5,450 tonnes (5,360 long tons; 6,010 short tons) per hour. The vessel is used to transport large bulk cargoes such as coal and ore on the Great Lakes and St. Lawrence Seaway.

== Construction and career ==
Whitefish Bay was constructed at the Chengxi shipyard in Jiangyin, China with the yard number 9303. The lake freighter's keel was laid down on 11 May 2012 and was launched on 23 July 2012. The ship was completed on 8 May 2013. Comedian Rick Mercer broadcast a recording of his visit to Whitefish Bay as it transited the lowest lock on the Welland Canal. The vessel is registered in Canada.

The ship went aground on 12 July 2016 at Hamilton Island in the Saint Lawrence Seaway east of Cornwall, Ontario while carrying a load of coal. According to the Department of Fisheries and Oceans, the ship suffered a massive power failure, which caused it to run aground. The ship was refloated on 14 July with the aid of tugboats and was to be taken to Saint-Zotique, Quebec for inspection.
