= Thunder Bay (ship) =

Trillium-class lake freighter

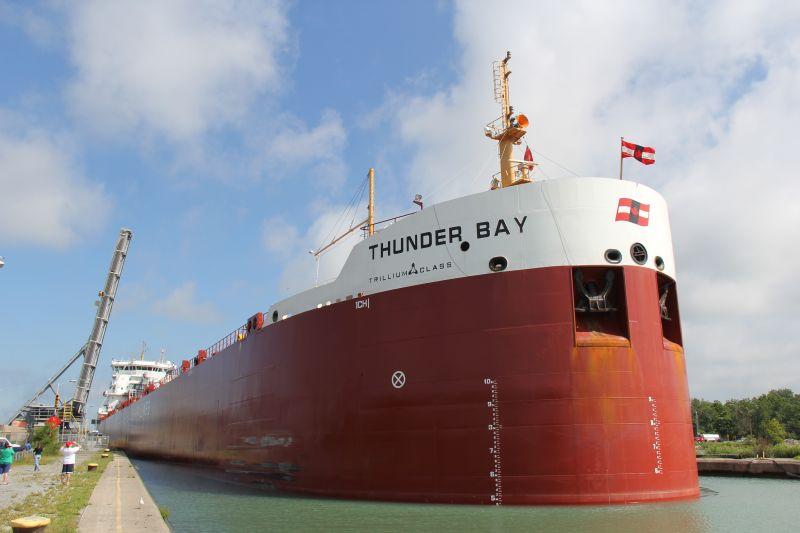
- Thunder Bay upbound out of Lock 2 of the Welland Canal

History
- Name: Thunder Bay
- Operator: Canada Steamship Lines
- Port of registry: Canada
- Builder: Chengxi shipyard, Jiangyin
- Yard number: 9302
- Completed: 13 May 2013
- Identification: IMO number: 9601039
- Status: in active service

General characteristics
- Class & type: Trillium-class freighter
- Tonnage: 24,300 GT; 37,690 DWT
- Length: 225.5 m (739 ft 10 in)
- Beam: 23.76 m (77 ft 11 in)
- Draught: 9 m (29 ft 6 in)
- Installed power: 1 x IMO Tier III MAN B&W 6S50ME diesel engine, 8,750 kW (11,730 hp)
- Propulsion: 1 shaft

Thunder Bay is a Trillium-class lake freighter cargo vessel, built and launched in China in 2013. The ship is owned, and operated on the Great Lakes, by the Canada Steamship Lines (CSL). Like her three sister ships in CSL's Trillium class, Baie St. Paul, Baie Comeau, and Whitefish Bay, the vessel is a self-unloading bulk carrier, with a conveyor belt on a long boom that can be deployed over port or starboard sides.

== Design and description ==
According to the Miramar Ship Index Thunder Bay has a gross tonnage (GT) of 24,430 and a deadweight tonnage (DWT) of 37,690 tons. However, on the CSL website, the ship is stated as measuring 24,430 GT and 34,500 DWT.

Thunder Bay is 225.5 metres (739 ft 10 in) long overall with a beam of 23.76 metres (77 ft 11 in). Thunder Bay has a maximum draught of 9 metres (29 ft 6 in). The ship is powered by one IMO Tier III MAN B&W 6S50ME diesel engine driving one shaft creating 8,750 kilowatts (11,730 hp).

The ship is equipped with five holds and has a net hold capacity of 41,917.96 cubic metres (1,480,319 cu ft). The vessel has an average unloading rate of 5,450 tonnes (5,360 long tons; 6,010 short tons) per hour. CSL asserts that the new vessels will be more efficient than existing vessels, and will leave less pollution.

== Construction and career ==
She was launched on 13 May 2013 and made her first transit of the Saint Lawrence Seaway in July 2013, and visited her namesake port, Thunder Bay, Ontario, on 27 September 2013. Louis Martel, President of CSL, Vance Badawey, mayor of Port Colborne, and Rick Dykstra, Member of Parliament for nearby St. Catharines, Ontario, presided over a celebration of the vessel's first cargo, on 8 August 2013, when she passed through Port Colborne, bound for Quebec City with a shipment of iron ore pellets from Escanaba, Michigan.
