= MV Mount Norefjell =

Newcastlemax bulk carrier

History
- Name: Mount Norefjell
- Owner: Himalaya Shipping
- Port of registry: Liberia
- Builder: New Times Shipbuilding
- Launched: 8 November 2022
- Acquired: 2 March 2022
- Identification: IMO number: 9939008

General characteristics
- Tonnage: 210,000 DWT
- Length: 300 m (984 ft 3 in)
- Beam: 50 m (164 ft 1 in)

MV Mount Norefjell is the first of twelve Newcastlemax bulk carriers ordered by Bermuda-based company Himalaya Shipping.

== Description ==
Mount Norefjell runs on dual-fuel liquid natural gas, with scrubbers that allow it to also be powered by high- and low-sulfur fuel oil. Additionally, it is equipped with newly developed shaft generators, making it around 4% more fuel efficient and 20% more space efficient than conventional ships. The ship has a deadweight tonnage of 210,000, a length of 300 meters, and a width of 50 meters.

== History ==
Mount Norefjell was launched by New Times Shipbuilding in China on 8 November 2022 alongside its sister ship Mount Ita. By 20 January 2023, the ship had finished its sea trials and was awaiting delivery to its owners.

On 2 March 2023, New Times Shipbuilding delivered the vessel to Himalaya Shipping, sending the vessel from its berthing in Jiangsu towards Singapore for its maiden voyage on 4 March. Mount Norefjell was chartered at a rate of $30,000 per day for an initial period of 24 months.
