= Canada Steamship Lines =

Shipping company

The CSL Group Inc.
- House flag
- Type: Private Company
- Industry: shipping
- Founded: 1845
- Headquarters: Montreal, Quebec, Canada
- Area served: Global
- Key people: Louis Martel (CEO)
- Number of employees: 2000+
- Website: www.cslships.com

Canada Steamship Lines (CSL) is a shipping company with headquarters in Montreal, Quebec, Canada. The business has been operating for well over a century and a half.

== Beginnings ==
House flag of Quebec Steamship Company used until the 1950s, especially on the Saint Lawrence River.

House flag introduced in the 1950s on the Great Lakes, added a maple leaf around 1965, same as the new flag of Canada.

In 1845, Jacques-Félix Sincennes and other Montreal businessmen founded the Richelieu Navigation Company; the company operated river boats on the Saint Lawrence River in general commerce. In 1875, the company merged with Sir Hugh Allan's Canadian Navigation Company to form the Richelieu and Ontario Navigation Company (R&O). The business grew with the expansion of the canal system on the upper St. Lawrence River (the precursor to the Saint Lawrence Seaway) and a new Welland Canal connecting to the upper Great Lakes.

In 1911, R&O merged with James Playfair's Northern Navigation Company. A special shareholders meeting on June 26 authorized the directors to raise issued stock from $5 million to $10 million. The money raised the new issuance was used to buy Northern Navigation and the Inland Lines. R&O added five more directors, with Playfair as vice president and managing director. The companies continued to operate under their respective names. In 1912, R&O bought the Niagara Navigation Company; Niagara Navigation had previously bought the Hamilton Steamboat Company and the Turbine Steamship Company. R&O began using the tag line "Niagara To The Sea" to advertise passenger service from the Niagara to the St. Lawrence regions.

Northern Navigation's Noronic was launched at Port Arthur, Ontario on June 2, 1913. A large number of R&O directors, including Playfair; the dignitaries travelled from Sarnia aboard Hamonic to attend the event. Playfair's wife was intended to christen the ship. Playfair was notified of his father's death shortly after Hamonic entered Lake Superior; he transferred to an R&O freighter about 80 miles (130 km) from Sault Ste. Marie and returned to Toronto by special train. Noronic was christened by E. Bristol, the wife of another director.

On June 19, 1913, a special shareholders meeting at the R&O office in Montreal convened to ratify the sale of the company to Canada Transportation Lines, a new company that would also include the St. Lawrence River Steamboat Company; Richelieu And Ontario Navigation Company of the United States; Quebec Steamship Company; Canada Interlake Line; Ontario and Quebec Navigation Company; Merchants' Montreal Line; SS Haddington and the Thousand Island Steamboat Company. In early December, it was announced that Canada Transportation Lines would be renamed to Canada Steamship Lines.

== Growth and disaster on the Great Lakes ==
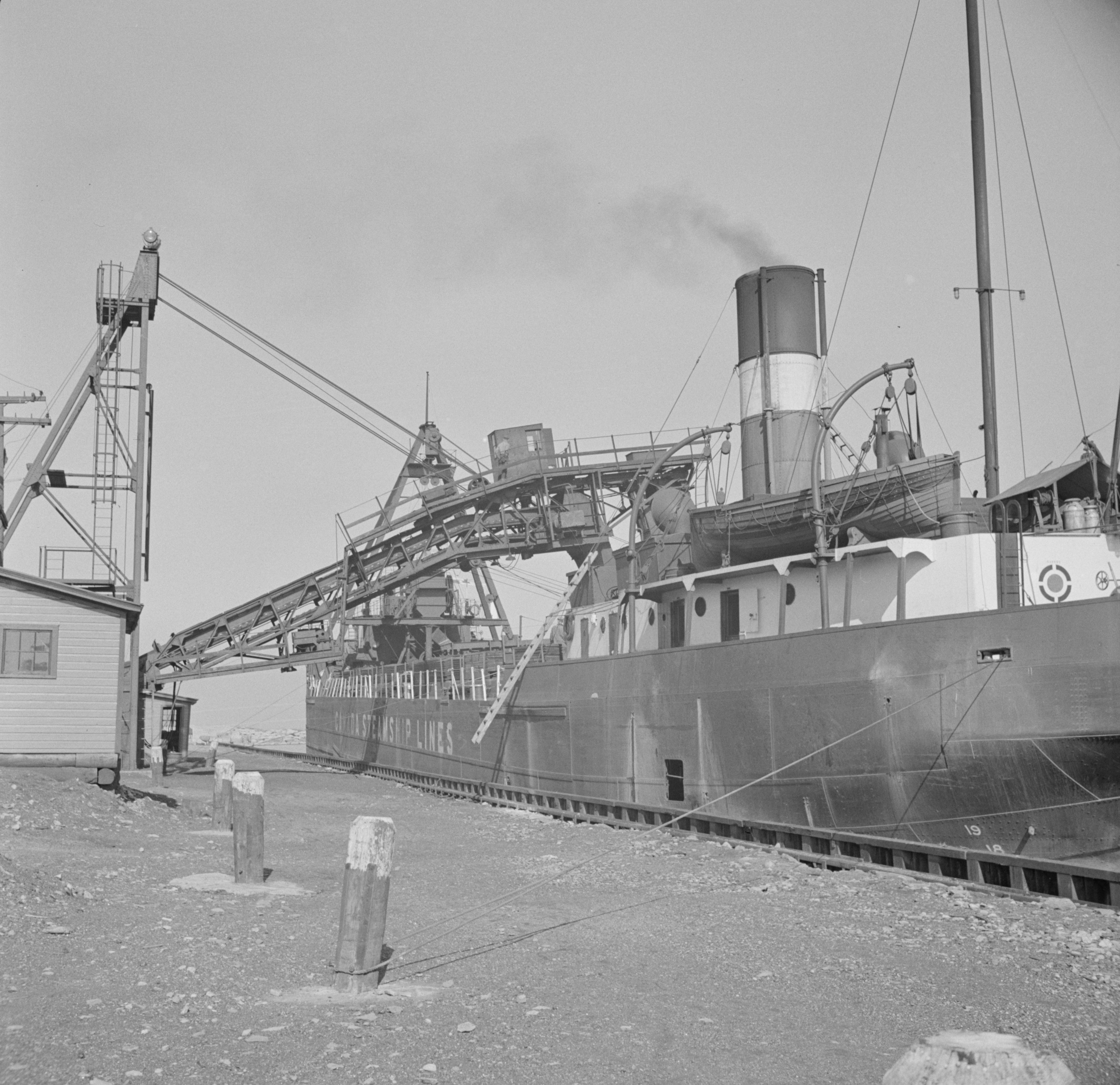
Coalhaven, bulk freighter of CSL, loading coal in Oswego, New York, in October, 1941

CSL's growth through the industrial booms of both world wars was largely tied to the increasing importance of the steel industry in Ontario, where mills were built, or soon to be built, in Sault Ste. Marie, Hamilton, and Nanticoke. CSL also tapped into the last of the remaining coal traffic from Pennsylvania across the Great Lakes to railways in Canada. Following railway dieselization, subsequent coal traffic would be moved by CSL to large fossil-fuel burning electrical power plants.

In addition to its cargo shipping, the company expanded its overnight passenger shipping traffic as well. Most notably the popular Hamonic, Huronic and Noronic of the old Niagara Navigation Company 1902–1912 lineage (roughly 6,000 GRT and 350 foot a piece). Their last passenger ships, however, came out in 1928. They were the cruise ships St. Lawrence, Quebec and Tadoussac; all built at the Davie Shipbuilding and Repair Co. in Lauzon, P.Q. "St. Lawrence" was built in 1927, and Quebec and Tadoussac were identical sister ships of 1928. They ran together with Richelieu, the former Narraganset (1913) of Long Island Sound, which was purchased by CSL about the same time the other three were built by Davie. The three ships were all 350 feet in length, had a breadth of 70 feet, and were 8,000 tones GRT; Richelieu was slightly smaller. They sailed on the St Lawrence and Saguenay Rivers, departing from Montreal and stopping at Quebec City, Murray Bay and Tadoussac (where the company owned hotels) and up the Saguenay to Bagotville (La Baie). Richelieu was able to go on to Chicoutimi because of her shallower draft. Quebec burned at Tadoussac in 1950 with the loss of seven lives, and the other three ships continued on the route until 1965. After the opening of the St. Lawrence Seaway, Tadoussac's bow was modified to make her able to make a few trips into Lake Ontario, and even made occasional trips through the updated Welland Canal to Buffalo and Detroit in the early 1960s. With the Yarmouth Castle fire in 1965 near the Bahamas, stricter coast guard safety regulations in the form of the new international SOLAS program put an end to the three ship's long careers. The Richelieu, St. Lawrence, and Tadoussac were all sold to Joseph de Smedt of Belgium. Tadoussac was renamed Passenger No. 2 and Richelieu, Passenger No. 3. Passenger No. 2 and the old St. Lawrence were eventually scrapped after serving as accommodation ships in the early 1970s, while Passenger No. 3 was sold to Danish interests and was renamed St. Lawrence 2 and served as an accommodation ship for Eastern Bloc refugees before being sold to Arab interests in 1975 as workers' barracks in Sharjah, UAE, where she became half-buried in sand by 1981, and scrapped down by 1990. The earlier Hamonic had burned due to a dock side fire in 1945 at Point Edward and was later scrapped. Huronic had already been converted to carry only freight by 1944, was retired and scrapped in 1950.

CSL was found responsible for the disastrous September 1949 fire and destruction of its ship the SS Noronic in Toronto Harbour. The fire swept through the ship killing 118 to 139 passengers (many as they slept), but no members of the crew. Inadequate alarm, passenger evacuation plans, and neglected extinguishing systems are found at fault. The captain was suspended one year for abandoning the ship before ensuring crew and passengers were safe. She was demolished in 1950.

No new passenger ships were built by this line or most other shipping lines due to the declining passenger ferry trade. To date, and despite something of a resurgence in passenger traffic on the Great Lakes in recent years, CSL has no known plans for a cruise ship service on or off of the Great Lakes.

== Power Corporation ==
In 1951, Sir James Dunn, the owner of Algoma Steel, gained effective control over the company.

CSL saw operations increase exponentially in the late 1950s with the opening of the expanded Saint Lawrence Seaway and the timely discovery and exploitation of some of the world's largest iron ore deposits on the Labrador Peninsula in Labrador City, Schefferville, and Mont Wright. Ore was moved to Sept-Îles and Port-Cartier by the Quebec North Shore and Labrador Railway and Cartier Railway respectively, where it was then loaded into bulk carriers for transfer to Canadian and U.S. steel mills on the Great Lakes. CSL exploited this traffic by continually refining its self-unloading bulk carrier designs, coupled with improvements in stevedoring at various ports to arrive at a minimal number of human operators required.

Following his passing in 1956, Dunn's estate would eventually sell off the CSL shares. In 1963, a non-controlling share of CSL was purchased by Montreal-headquartered Power Corporation, a Quebec industrial conglomerate with interests in electricity generation, pulp and paper, and oil and gas. CSL continued operating and expanding its Great Lakes shipping line and the Collingwood and Lauzon shipyards through the 1960s, and witnessed several labour disputes.

=== Paul Martin joins the board ===
In 1969, Power Corporation took a controlling share in CSL. On December 2, 1970, Paul Martin, the 32-year-old executive assistant to Power Corporation Chief Executive Officer (CEO) Maurice Strong, was appointed to the CSL board of directors. In 1971 CSL minority shareholders sold outstanding shares to Power Corporation, making CSL a Power Corporation subsidiary.

At this time, CSL was given elevated status, where in the words of Power Corporation "...in order to increase its [Power Corporation's] own cash flow and take advantage of new federal tax regulations benefitting operating companies over holding companies, CSL took over most of Power's investment portfolio at book value."

=== Paul Martin becomes president ===
CSL suffered losses in 1972 when forced to cover unexpected cost overruns in the construction of three 80,000-ton ocean-going tankers at Davie Shipbuilding. On November 22, 1973 Paul Martin was appointed President and CEO of the CSL Group. In 1974, CSL earnings were further hurt by an eight-week strike on the Great Lakes.

In 1976, Power Corporation reversed itself and took over the investment portfolio which had been sold to CSL five years earlier. CSL reverted to an operating division of Power Corporation at this time. On June 7, 1981, CSL President and CEO Paul Martin announced plans to expand outside of the Great Lakes and St. Lawrence River: "The Great Lakes are essentially a Canadian pond... Canadians have captured 95 percent of the business. Now we want our chance to try our wings on the oceans."

== Paul Martin buys CSL Group Inc. ==
One month later, in July 1981, Power Corporation announced it was selling its subsidiary CSL Group for CA$195 million. CSL Group at this time included the shipping company, shipyards, engineering firms, and a bus service (Voyageur, previously known as Provincial Transport). The following month, in August 1981, Paul Martin and his friend Lawrence Pathy with the help of Gordon Black, secured financing and announced their intention to purchase CSL Group Incorporated for the price advertised by Power Corporation.

On August 9, 1983, citing federal government interference in the shipping industry, Martin stated: "then... they are going to come in with some grand and glorious package that will give the government control of the industry because they don't understand private enterprise."

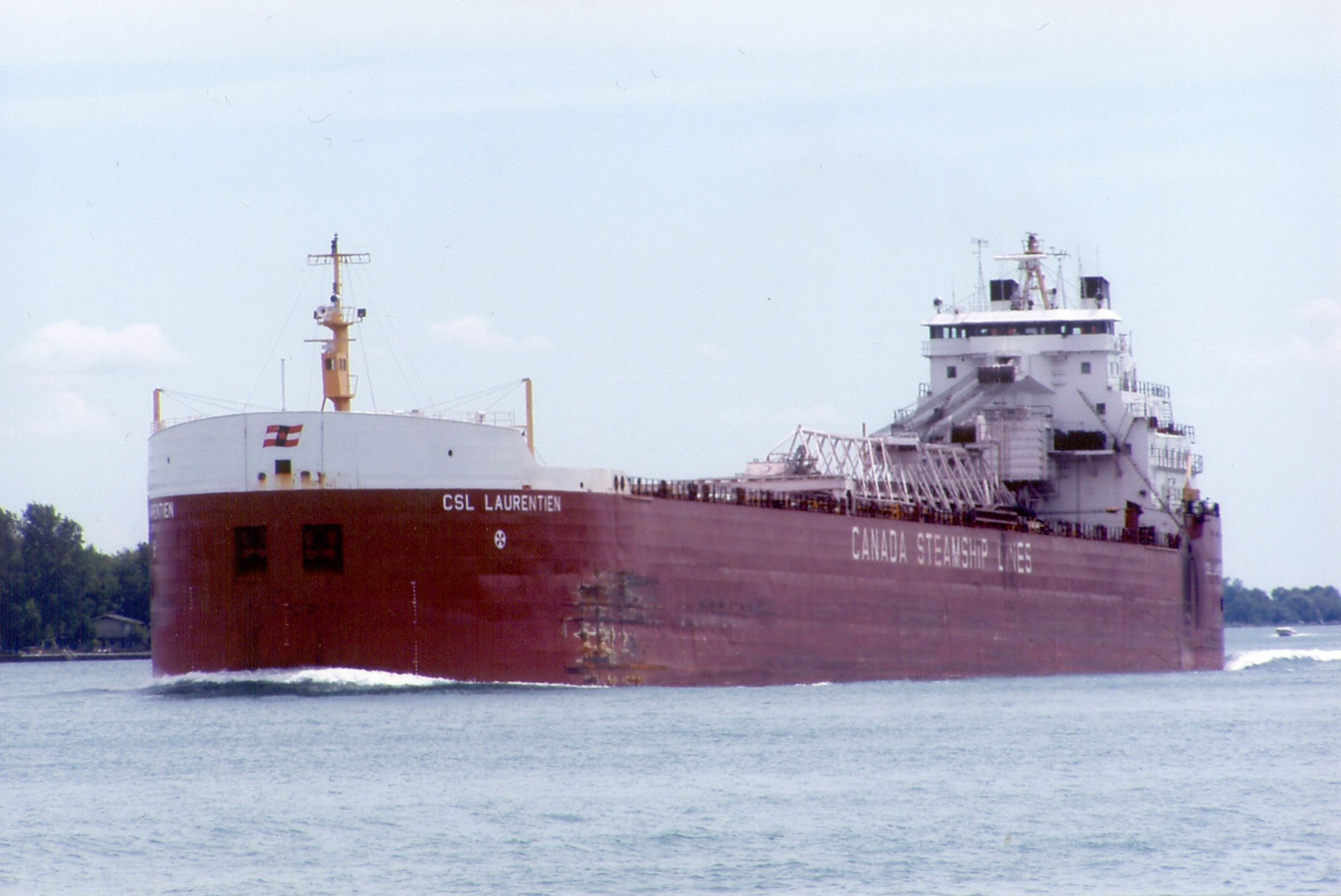
Canada Steamship Lines CSL Laurentien, upbound through the St.Clair River

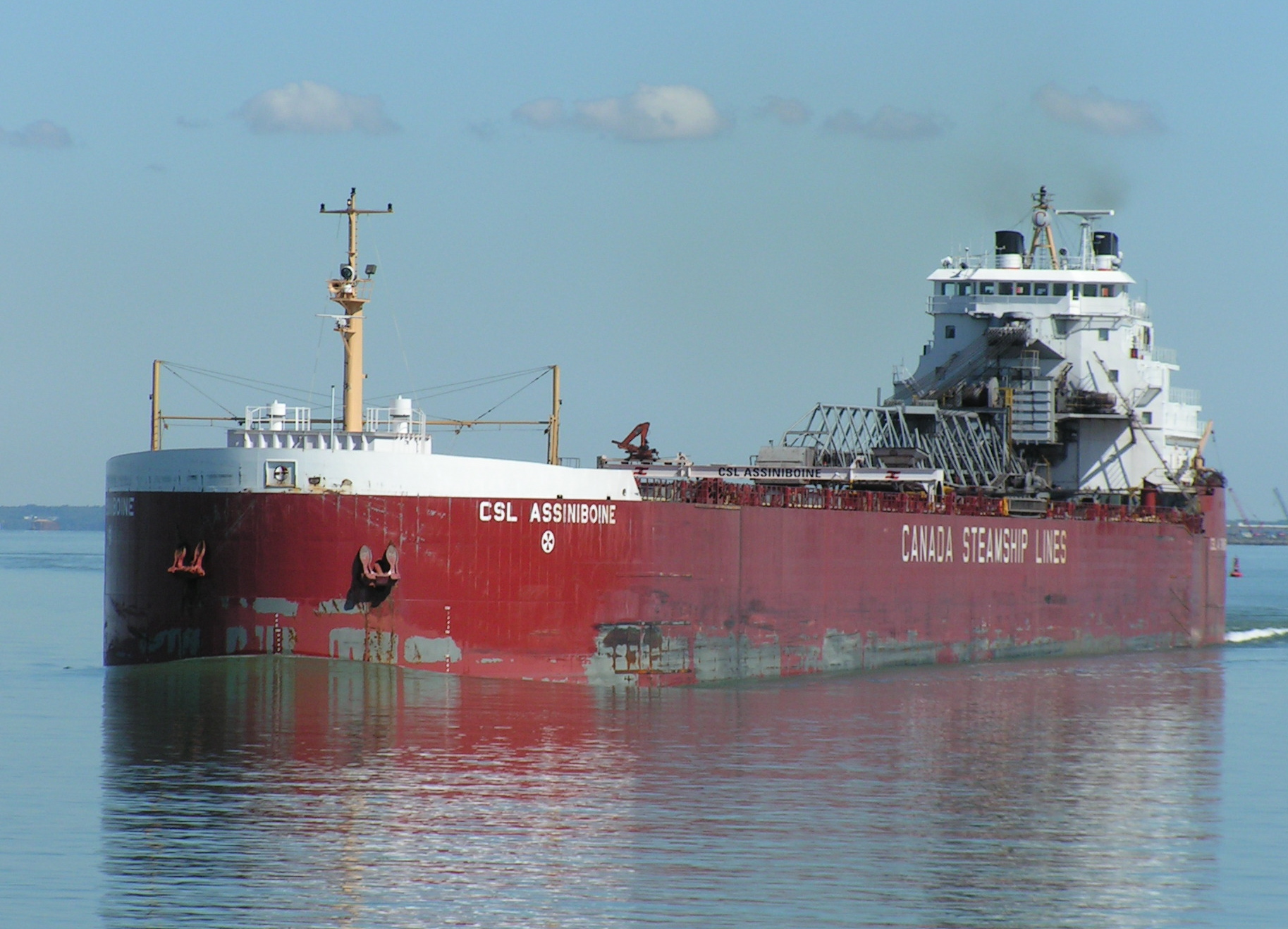
CSL Assiniboine in 2006.

By the mid-1980s, CSL's only remaining shipyard (Collingwood Shipbuilding) was undergoing financial difficulties and was closed on September 12, 1986, with the loss of 800 jobs. At the same time, CSL Group Inc.'s expansion outside of Canada was well underway. In November 1988, President and CEO Paul Martin was elected as a Member of Parliament and stepped aside from directing the day-to-day operations of the company.

In March 1991, following changes to Canada's taxation laws regarding international earnings, CSL backed away from threats to move its headquarters outside of Canada, however in December the president who replaced Martin resigned in opposition to plans to move international operations outside the country.

Replacement management in April 1992 formed a new CSL Group Inc. subsidiary headquartered in Massachusetts to be called CSL International Inc. Canada Steamship Lines Inc. would remain as the Canadian operation under CSL Group Inc., and the conglomerate would remain headquartered in Montreal.

In November 1993, the newly re-elected Paul Martin was appointed to the cabinet and named Minister of Finance. On February 1, 1994, Martin placed his shares in CSL Group Inc. under a "Supervisory Agreement" to be managed by lawyers and financial advisors, although he would be allowed to intervene in company decision-making should events warrant.

In June 2002, Martin quit the cabinet as Minister of Finance to pursue a bid for leadership of the Liberal Party of Canada. On March 11, 2003, Martin bowed to public and media pressure on his interest in CSL Group Inc. and announced that he would sell his interests in the company to his three sons, saying that his ownership would "provide an unnecessary distraction during the leadership race."

On December 12, 2003, Martin became the 21st Prime Minister of Canada. On January 28, 2004, the federal government, in response to opposition party and media enquiries, revealed that CSL Group Inc. had received CA$162 million in federal government contracts, grants and loans since Paul Martin became Minister of Finance in 1993. Earlier figures released in 2003 had suggested CSL Group Inc. had only earned CA$137,000 in federal government contracts during this time period.

=== Flag of convenience controversy ===
Throughout the 1990s, CSL Group Inc. oversaw the reflagging of several former Canadian-registered vessels which were placed under the shipping registries of nations commonly referred to as flags of convenience, where safety and labour laws were relaxed to be more business-friendly. Canadian crews were replaced with cheaper Ukrainian ones.

== Operations ==
CSL Group Incorporated operates Canadian (Canada Steamship Lines) and international (CSL International) subsidiaries. In 2001, they overtook Asia Pacific Marine Container Lines, also a Canadian shipping company, becoming the world's largest fleet of dry-bulk self-unloading vessels.

== CSL fleet ==
These lake freighters are all in the 700-footer class which are between 729 and 739 feet (222 and 225 m) long:

=== Self-unloading vessels ===
Baie Comeau, Baie St. Paul, CSL Assiniboine, CSL Laurentien, CSL Niagara, CSL Tadoussac, Frontenac, Rt. Hon. Paul J. Martin, Thunder Bay, Whitefish Bay, Nukumi

=== Gearless bulk vessels ===
CSL St-Laurent, CSL Welland, Spruceglen, Oakglen, Ferbec

=== Cement carriers ===
Tamarack (Co-owned by CSL and SMT Shipping)

=== CSL Americas fleet (formerly CSL International) ===
Alice Oldendorff, Ambassador, Bahama Spirit, Balder, Ballangen, Barkald, Bauta, Bernhard Oldendorff, CSL Acadian, CSL Atlas, CSL Argosy, CSL Cabo, CSL Metis, CSL Spirit, CSL Trailblazer, Eastern Power, Harmen Oldendorff, Honourable Henry Jackman, Johanna Oldendorff, Nelvana, Pioneer, Sheila Ann, Sophie Oldendorff, Yeoman Brook, Weser Stahl*

Asterisk (*) denotes vessels owned by CSL Group Inc. All other vessels are "pooled" with pool partners Egon Oldendorff, Marbulk Shipping Inc (50% owned by The CSL Group), and the Torvald Klaveness Group, of which CSL Group Inc. owns partial or controlling shares.

=== New Trillium classes ===
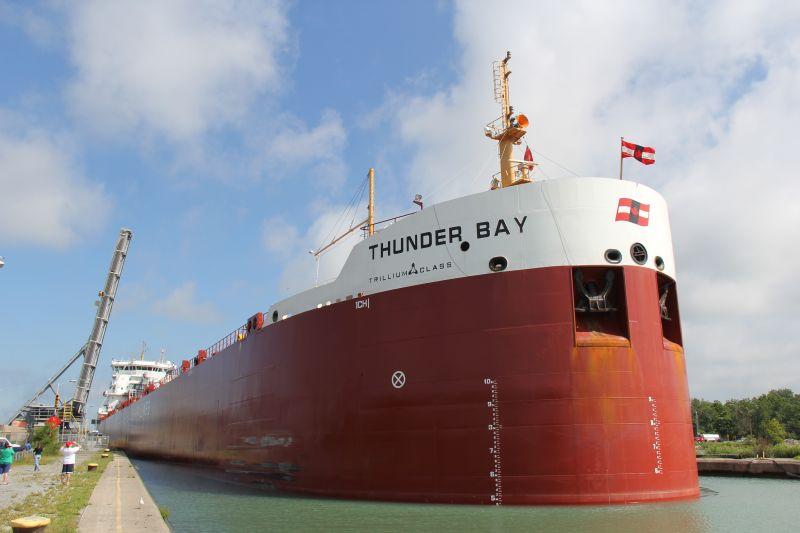
Thunder Bay upbound out of Lock 2 of the Welland Canal

In the early 2010s, CSL introduced two new classes of vessels, both named the Trillium class. Baie St. Paul, commissioned in 2012, was the first lake freighter Trillium-class ship. The other ships in this fleet, Whitefish Bay, Thunder Bay and Baie Comeau entered service in 2013.

Rt. Hon. Paul E. Martin, entered service in 2012, was the first panamax Trillium-class ship. CSL Tecumseh, commissioned in 2013, was CSL's second panamax Trillium-class vessel. CSL Tacoma, also entered service in 2013, was the third ship in this group.

The first of two Trillium-class bulk vessels, CSL Welland departed Yangfan Shipyard in early November 2014, and reached Montreal on January 2, 2015. The second one, CSL St-Laurent, passed through the Panama Canal in January 2015.

=== Nukumi ===
In 2022 CSL received MV Nukumi. The ship was built for servicing Windsor Salt.

== See also ==
- Canada Steamship Lines Ltd v The King [1952] AC 192
- List of largest container shipping companies
