= MV Adriatica =

Bulk carrier that sank in 2010

Coordinates: 31.807°N 34.623°E

History
- Name: Adriatica; Marvel K
- Owner: Interglobal Shipping 3001, Ltd.
- Port of registry: Moldova
- Launched: 19 September 1981
- Completed: 1981
- Identification: Call sign: ERIB; IMO number: 8022602; MMSI no.: 214180902
- Fate: Sank on December 12, 2010
- Notes: Formerly Marvel K

General characteristics
- Tonnage: 3,033 DWT
- Length: 85 m (278 ft 10 in)
- Beam: 12 m (39 ft 4 in)

Adriatica was a bulk carrier that sank in the Mediterranean Sea on December 12, 2010.

== Sinking ==
Adriatica sank off the Israeli port city of Ashdod in heavy seas on the morning of December 12, 2010, after issuing a mayday distress signal. The ship was carrying a cargo of 3,000 tonnes of steel. The crew of 11 Ukrainian nationals took to two life rafts. Israeli Navy and Israeli Air Force helicopters began search and rescue operations but the crew was saved by a nearby Taiwanese vessel before the Israeli rescuers were able to reach the life rafts.
