= HMS Pioneer =

Nine ships of the Royal Navy have borne the name HMS Pioneer:

- HMS Pioneer (1804) was a 14-gun brig listed 1804–1807.
- HMS Pioneer (1810) was a Pigmy–class schooner of the Royal Navy, launched in 1810 as a cutter. During her service with the Navy she captured one French privateer and assisted at the capture of another. In 1823–1824 she underwent fitting for the Coast Guard blockade. She then served with the Coast Guard to 1845. She was sold at Plymouth in 1849.
- HMS Pioneer (1850) was a wood-hulled screw discovery vessel purchased 16 February 1850 to search for Franklin's lost expedition. She was originally built in 1847 by R & H Green, Blackwall as the merchant ship Eider. She was abandoned, icebound, on 25 August 1854 off Bathurst Island in the Arctic.
- HMS Pioneer (1856) was a wood screw gunvessel launched in 1856. She was broken up in 1865.
- HMS Pioneer (1864) was a wood-hulled paddle survey vessel built in 1860, transferred from the Colonial Office in 1864. She was sold in 1873.
- HMS Pioneer (1874) was a composite paddle vessel launched in 1874. She was broken up in 1888.
- HMS Pioneer (1892) was a river gunboat launched in 1892. In 1893 she was dismantled and then re-erected in Lake Nyasa. She was transferred to the British Central Africa government in 1894.
- HMS Pioneer was a Pelorus-class light cruiser launched in 1899. She was transferred to the Royal Australian Navy in 1912 where she became HMAS Pioneer.
- HMS Pioneer (R76) was a Colossus-class aircraft carrier launched in 1944. She was originally named Ethalion, then Mars. She was broken up in 1954.

== See also ==
- Pioneer (1862), a gunboat commissioned by New Zealand and manned by the Royal Navy
