= Berge Fjord =

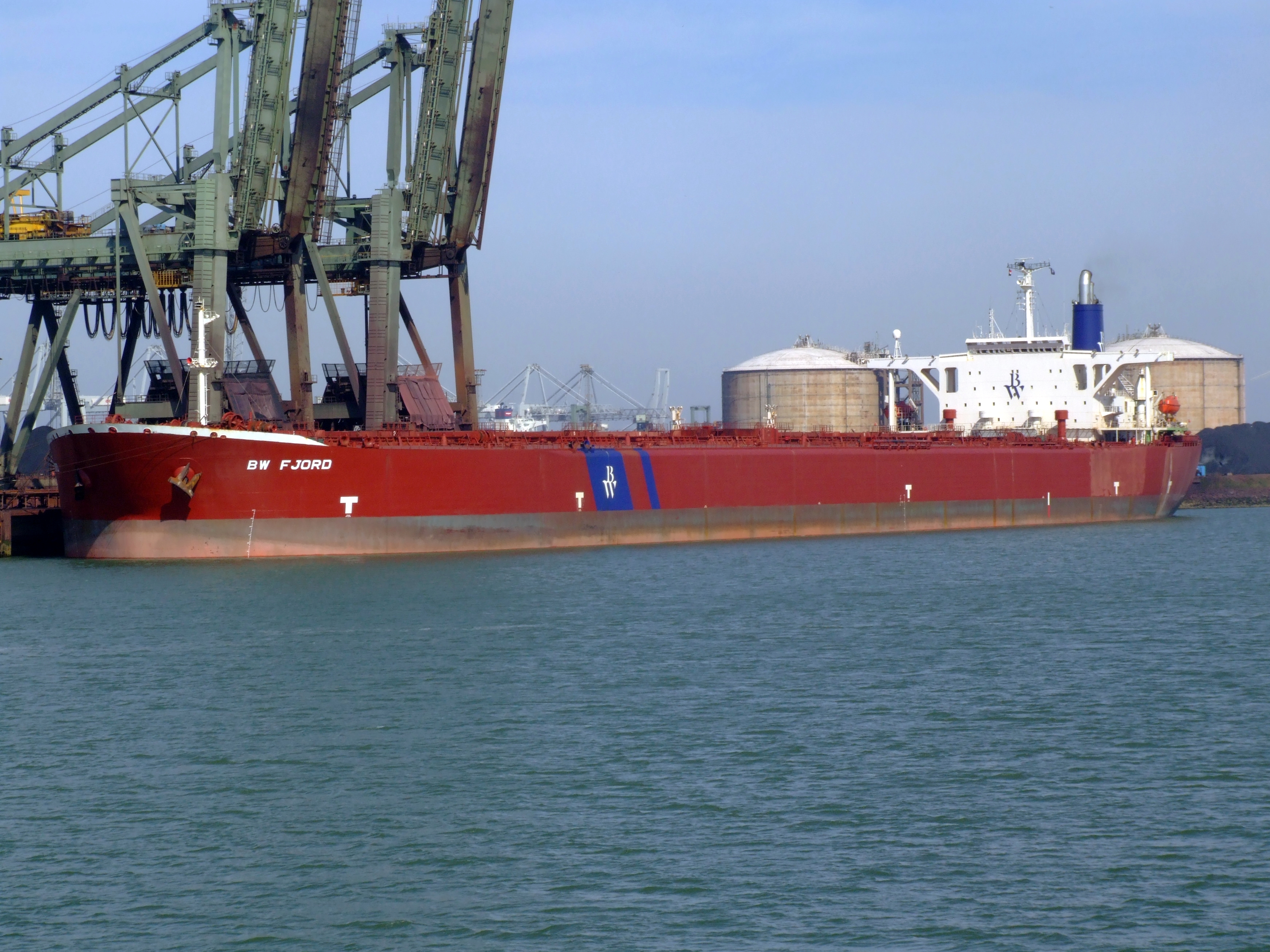

History
- Name: Berge Fjord
- Operator: BW Fleet Management
- Builder: Brazil Estaleiros S.A.
- Launched: 18 December 1985
- Identification: Call sign: 3ECK9; IMO number: 8314471; MMSI number: 371391000
- Fate: Scrapped 18 February 2017

General characteristics
- Class & type: Ore carrier
- Tonnage: 159,534 GT; 63,935 NT; 310,698 DWT
- Length: 331.50 m (1,087.6 ft)
- Beam: 57.20 m (187.7 ft)
- Draught: 23.19 m (76.1 ft)
- Installed power: Sulzer 8RTA84 (25,651 kW)
- Speed: 14.9 knots (27.6 km/h; 17.1 mph) (max); 14.0 knots (25.9 km/h; 16.1 mph) (service)

Berge Fjord (ex Docefjord) was one of the largest ore carriers in the world.

== Design ==
The Berge Fjord was built in 1986 by shipbuilder Industrias Verolme Ishibras in the yard of Brazil Estaleiros S.A. The ship had an overall length of 331.50 m (1,087.6 ft), while the length between perpendiculars was 316.00 m (1,036.75 ft). Berge Fjord had moulded breadth 57.20 m (187.7 ft) and extreme breadth of 57.26 m (187.9 ft). The depth of the ship was 30.90 m (101.4 ft), while the draft, when fully loaded, is 23.19 m (76.1 ft). The ship was built according to double hull technology. Builders utilized the space between double hulls for ballast tanks, which are easier for usage and maintenance, without interfering with the cargo spaces. The deadweight of Berge Fjord was 310,698 metric tons, the gross tonnage 159,534 and the net tonnage 63,935.

== Engineering ==
The main engine of Berge Fjord was Sulzer 8RTA84, which provided total power of 25,651 kW to the ship. The main engine technology was based on the common rail engine RTA84. Berge Fjord had fuel consumption of 194 t/day of HFO in service.
