= MV Yasa Jupiter =

Turkish bulk carrier

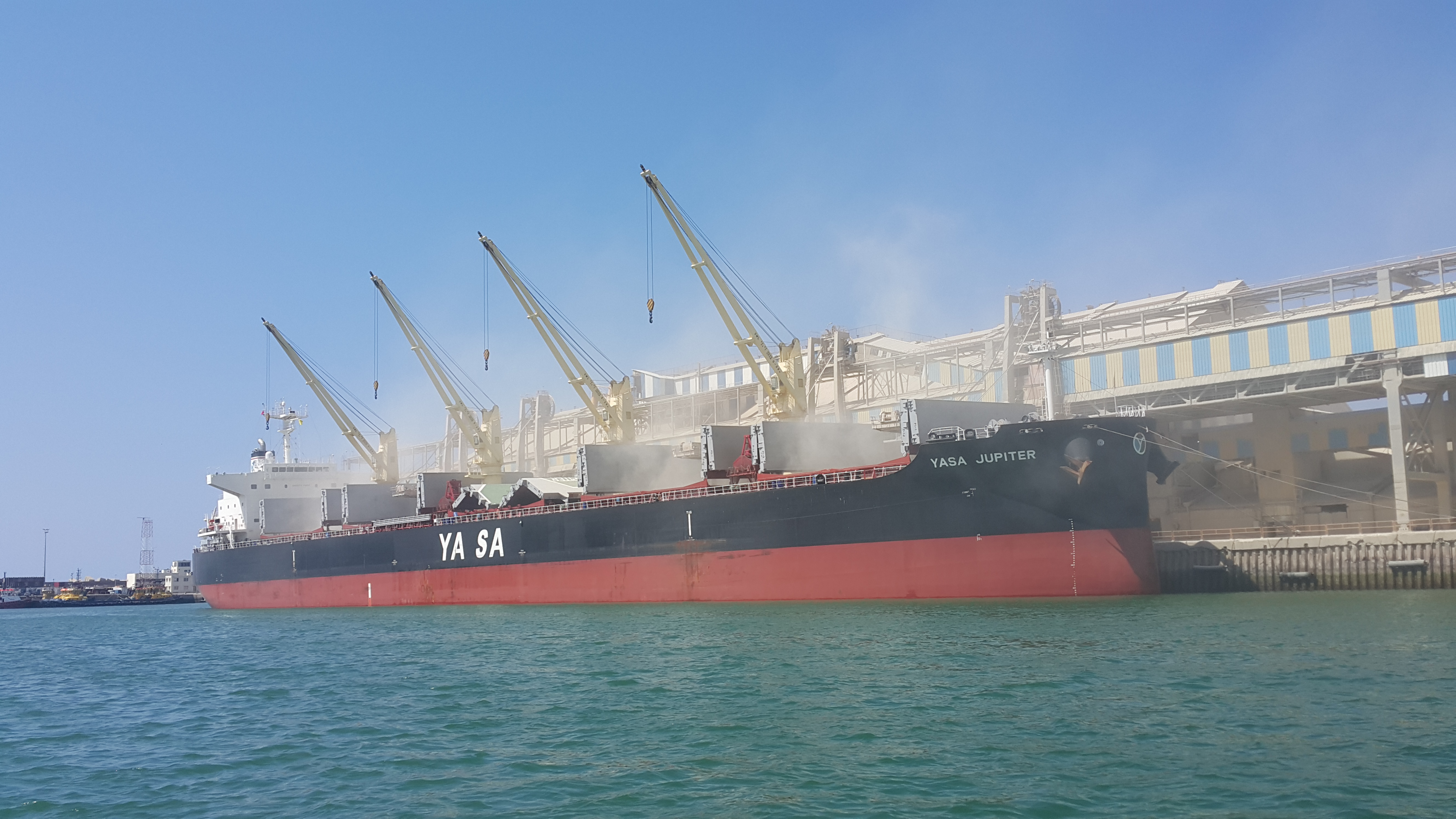
- Yasa Jupiter in Casablanca, Morocco

History

Turkey
- Name: Yasa Jupiter
- Owner: Mirror Ventures S.A.
- Operator: Yasa Denizcilik S.A., Istanbul
- Port of registry: Majuro, Marshall Islands
- Builder: Dalian Cosco
- Yard number: DE060
- Laid down: 21 December 2015
- Launched: 19 March 2019
- Completed: 13 June 2019
- Identification: IMO number: 9848132; MMSI number: 538008172; Callsign: V7A2042

General characteristics
- Tonnage: 34,508 GT 61,000 DWT
- Length: 199.9 m (655 ft 10 in) overall
- Beam: 32 m (105 ft 0 in)
- Draught: 9.1 m (29 ft 10 in)

MV Yasa Jupiter is a Turkish-owned, Marshall Islands-flagged bulk carrier. It was the first merchant vessel damaged during the 2022 Russian invasion of Ukraine.

== Characteristics ==
Yasa Jupiter has a maximum tonnage of 61,000 DWT. It is 199.9 m (656 ft) long, has a beam of 32 m (105 ft), and has a 9.1 m (30 ft) draught. It is operated by a crew of 19 people.

The ship

== History ==
On 24 February 2022, Yasa Jupiter was transiting through the Black Sea on its way to Romania after having unloaded its cargo in Odesa, Ukraine. While underway, the vessel was struck by a missile which hit one of its hatch covers and shattered the windows in the bridge. None of the nineteen crew (8 Turks and 11 Filipinos) were injured and the vessel was able to continue on its course to Romania.
