= List of shipwrecks in August 1852 =

The list of shipwrecks in August 1852 includes ships sunk, wrecked, foundered, grounded, or otherwise lost during August 1852.

== 1 August ==
List of shipwrecks: August 1852
Ship	State	Description
Ann	United Kingdom	The ship sprang a leak and foundered in the Bristol Channel off Worms Head, Glamorgan. Her crew were rescued. She was on a voyage from Newport, Monmouthshire to Queenstown, County Cork.

== 2 August ==
List of shipwrecks: 2 August 1852
Ship	State	Description
Antelope	United States	The barque ran aground and capsized in the Yangtze upstream of Woosung. She was consequently condemned.
Clara	(United Kingdom of Great Britain and Ireland) British North America	The ship was driven ashore and damaged at Chance Cove, Newfoundland. She was refloated on 24 August and taken in to Saint John's, Newfoundland, where she was beached.
Stella	(United Kingdom of Great Britain and Ireland) British North America	The ship was abandoned in the Atlantic Ocean. Her crew were rescued. She was on a voyage from Savannah, Georgia, United States to Saint John, New Brunswick.

== 3 August ==
List of shipwrecks: 3 August 1852
Ship	State	Description
Gesina	Prussia	The ship was sighted in the Øresund whilst on a voyage from the Firth of Forth to Königsberg. No further trace, presumed foundered in the Baltic Sea with the loss of all hands.
Maise	United Kingdom	The ship was struck by lightning and sank in the Mediterranean Sea 30 nautical miles (56 km) north west of Cape Bon, Algeria with the loss of all but her captain from her eight crew. He was rescued by the barque Peter Schroeder (Norway). Maise was on a voyage from Brăila, Ottoman Empire to Queenstown, County Cork.
William	United Kingdom	The ship ran aground on the Holm Sand, in the North Sea off the coast of Suffolk. She was on a voyage from Arkhangelsk, Russia to Plymouth, Devon.

== 4 August ==
List of shipwrecks: 4 August 1852
Ship	State	Description
E. and E. Perkins	United Kingdom	The ship was abandoned in the Atlantic Ocean. All on board were rescued. She was on a voyage from Greenock, Renfrewshire to Philadelphia, Pennsylvania, United States.

== 5 August ==
List of shipwrecks: 5 August 1852
Ship	State	Description
Australian Packet	United Kingdom	The ship was driven ashore on the coast of Gippsland, Victoria.
Emma	(Russian Empire) Grand Duchy of Finland	The ship was driven ashore and wrecked on Gotland, Sweden.

== 6 August ==
List of shipwrecks: 6 August 1852
Ship	State	Description
Abberton	United Kingdom	The ship was driven ashore at Melbourne, New South Wales. She was on a voyage from Melbourne to London.
Enchantress	United Kingdom	The brig was wrecked on the Roccas with the loss of five of her eleven crew. The survivors remained on the wreck for 23 days before taking to a raft. They were rescued two days later by Richard (United Kingdom).
Helen	United Kingdom	The brig was destroyed by fire in the Atlantic Ocean 30°30′N 52°00′W). All on board (including Alfred Russel Wallace) took to a longboat and a gig. They were rescued on 15 August by Jordeson (United Kingdom) when 200 nautical miles (370 km) off Bermuda (32°46′N 61°00′W). Helen was on a voyage from Pará, Brazil to London.
Unicorn	(United Kingdom of Great Britain and Ireland) British North America	The ship was wreck on a reef off Blue Hill, Maine, United States. She was on a voyage from Baltimore, Maryland to Jamaica.

== 7 August ==
List of shipwrecks: 7 August 1852
Ship	State	Description
Commerce	United Kingdom	The brig ran aground and was beached in the Saint Lawrence River. She was on a voyage from Glasgow, Renfrewshire to Quebec City, Province of Canada, British North America.
Sally and Susannah	United Kingdom	The schooner was in collision with the schooner Emma (United Kingdom) and sank in the English Channel off Hastings, Sussex. Her crew were rescued by Emma. Sally and Susanna was on a voyage from Hartlepool, County Durham and Portsmouth, Hampshire.
Screw	(United Kingdom of Great Britain and Ireland) Victoria	The steamship ran aground on King Island, Van Diemen's Land. All on board, more than 250 people, were rescued. She was on a voyage from Melbourne to Launceston, Van Diemen's Land.
RMS Severn	United Kingdom	The steamship caught fire in the Atlantic Ocean north of Madeira. She was on a voyage from Brazil to Southampton, Hampshire, which she completed after the fire was extinguished.
Vulcano	Spanish Navy	The paddle steamer ran aground in Vigo Bay.

== 8 August ==
List of shipwrecks: August 1852
Ship	State	Description
Elizabeth	United Kingdom	The ship ran aground on the Drogden. She was on a voyage from Torrevieja, Spain to Königsberg, Prussia. She was refloated on 31 August and taken in to Copenhagen, Denmark in a leaky condition.
James	United Kingdom	The ship was driven ashore at "Bjornekas", Sweden. She was on a voyage from Kronstadt, Russia to an English port. She was refloated and resumed her voyage.
Sally and Susannah	United Kingdom	The ship was in collision with Emma (United Kingdom) and sank in the English Channel off Hastings, Sussex. Her crew were rescued.

== 9 August ==
List of shipwrecks: 9 August 1852
Ship	State	Description
Edward Coke	United Kingdom	The ship departed from Wisbech, Cambridgeshire for Waterford. No further trace, presumed foundered with the loss of all hands.
Ireland	(United Kingdom of Great Britain and Ireland) British North America	The steamship was destroyed by fire off Cape Rouge, Province of Canada. She was on a voyage from Quebec City to Montreal.
Mary	United Kingdom	The flat was driven ashore near Abergele, Denbighshire.
Pilot	United Kingdom	The flat was driven ashore near Abergele.

== 10 August ==
List of shipwrecks: 10 August 1852
Ship	State	Description
Charles	United Kingdom	The ship departed from Barnstaple, Devon for Falmouth, Cornwall. No further trace, presumed foundered with the loss of all hands.
Foigh-a-Ballagh	(United Kingdom of Great Britain and Ireland) New South Wales	The abandoned ship was driven ashore at Port Phillip, South Australia.
Viper	United Kingdom	The ship departed from Portsmouth, Hampshire for the Cape Coast Castle. No further trace, presumed foundered with the loss of all hands.

== 11 August ==
List of shipwrecks: 11 August 1852
Ship	State	Description
Active	United Kingdom	The smack was driven ashore and wrecked at Stratton, Cornwall. Her crew were rescued. She was on a voyage from Gloucester to Totnes, Devon.
Duke	United Kingdom	The ship was driven ashore on the coast of Sicily. She was on a voyage from Galaţi, Ottoman Empire to Queenstown, County Cork.
Geordina Cornelia	Flag unknown	The ship was driven ashore and damaged near the Tolbachin Lighthouse, Russia. She was on a voyage from London, United Kingdom to Kronstadt, Russia. She was refloated on 14 August and towed in to Saint Petersburg, Russia.
George Stone	United Kingdom	The ship was wrecked on Ynys Dulas, Anglesey with the loss of all hands.
Hawkesbury Lass	(United Kingdom of Great Britain and Ireland) New South Wales	The ship was wrecked on Babel Island, Van Diemen's Land. Her crew were rescued. She was on a voyage from Sydney to Port Phillip, Victoria.
Hooghly	United States	The clipper ship ran aground on the North Bank, in the Yangtze and was wrecked. Her crew were rescued. She was on a voyage from San Francisco, California to Shanghai, China.
Killow	United Kingdom	The ship was driven ashore at Hayle, Cornwall. She was refloated on 16 August.
Mary Ann	United Kingdom	The brigantine was driven ashore and severely damaged at Newquay, Cornwall. She was on a voyage from Newport, Monmouthshire to Danzig. She was refloated on 13 August and taken in to Newquay.
Mary Ann	United Kingdom	The ship was driven ashore at Hayle. She was refloated on 16 August.
Petit Henri	France	The ship was holed by her anchor and sank at the Mumbles, Glamorgan, United Kingdom. She was on a voyage from Neath, Glamorgan to Morlaix, Finistère. She was refloated on 18 August and taken in to port for repairs.
Phœnix	United Kingdom	The schooner foundered in the English Channel off the coast of Dorset with the loss of all five people on board.
Primrose	United Kingdom	The schooner was abandoned off Boscastle, Cornwall. Her six crew were rescued by a pilot boat. She was subsequently driven ashore and wrecked at Morwenstow, Cornwall.
Prometheus	United Kingdom	The schooner was driven ashore and wrecked at Zennor, Cornwall. She was refloated on 16 August and taken in to St. Ives, Cornwall.
Providence	Board of Customs	The tender, a cutter, was driven ashore on Carn Thomas, Isles of Scilly. She was refloated and taken in to St. Mary's, Isles of Scilly.
Sovereign	United Kingdom	The ship was beached and severely damaged at St. Ives. She was on a voyage from Swansea, Glamorgan to London.
Windsor Castle	United States	The ship ran aground in the Mississippi River downstream of New Orleans, Louisiana. She was on a voyage from New Orleans to Bordeaux, Gironde, France.

== 12 August ==
List of shipwrecks: 12 August 1852
Ship	State	Description
Auspicious	United Kingdom	The ship was driven ashore at Hayle, Cornwall. She was refloated on 16 August.
Brothers	United Kingdom	The ship was driven ashore at Hayle.
Cerere	Malta	The brig ran aground on the Whiting Sand, in the North Sea off the coast of Suffolk, United Kingdom. Her fourteen crew were rescued by the smack Aurora's Increase (United Kingdom). She was on a voyage from Odesa to Ipswich, Suffolk. Cerere was refloated with assistance of the smacks Aurora's Increase, Mary and Tryal and the tug John and William (all United Kingdom).
Cupid	United Kingdom	The ship foundered in the North Sea. Her crew were rescued by Great Britain (United Kingdom). Cupid was on a voyage from the River Tyne to London.
Dicky Sam	(United Kingdom of Great Britain and Ireland) Isle of Man	The ship sprang a leak at Amlwch, Anglesey.
Hoogly	United States	The ship was wrecked in the Yang-tze-Kiang.
Liancourt	France	The Havre ship, under Captain Lopez, was wrecked in the Gulf of Tauisk during a sudden squall. Her captain and part of her crew were rescued on August 14 by the ship Massachusetts (United States), of Nantucket, while the rest of her crew went aboard other French whaleships. On August 23, a ship found casks with provisions and pieces of the wreck to the west of the bay.
Mary and Elise	(United Kingdom of Great Britain and Ireland) Saint Lucia	The ship was capsized by a whirlwind and sank with the loss of two lives. She was on a voyage from Saint Vincent to Saint Lucia.
Pearl	United Kingdom	The brig was driven ashore at Hayle. She was refloated on 16 August.
Vesper	United Kingdom	The ship was driven ashore near St. Ives, Cornwall. Her crew were rescued.

== 13 August ==
List of shipwrecks: 13 August 1852
Ship	State	Description
Battina	Kingdom of Sardinia	The ship ran aground at Rio de Janeiro, Brazil. She was on a voyage from Lima, Peru to Genoa. She was refloated and taken in to Rio de Janeiro in a leaky condition.
Champion	United Kingdom	The ship was driven ashore near West Lulworth, Dorset. Her crew were rescued.
Eliza	United Kingdom	The ship was driven ashore and sank in the "Bay of Ausic", 24 nautical miles (44 km) west of Boulogne, Pas-de-Calais, France. Her crew were rescued. She was on a voyage from Messina, Sicily to London.
Penrith	United Kingdom	The ship was driven ashore 6 nautical miles (11 km) east of Bridport, Dorset. Her crew were rescued. She was on a voyage from London to Penzance, Cornwall.

== 14 August ==
List of shipwrecks: 14 August 1852
Ship	State	Description
Aalto	Sweden	The ship ran aground and was wrecked near Ringkøbing, Denmark. Her crew were rescued. She was on a voyage from Kertch, Russia to Kronstadt, Russia.
Apollon	France	The ship was driven ashore 2 nautical miles (3.7 km) south of the mouth of the Senegal River. She was on a voyage from Marseille, Bouches-du-Rhône to Bathurst, Gambia Colony and Protectorate.
Brother	United States	The ship departed from Philadelphia, Pennsylvania for Pernambuco, Brazil. No further trace, presumed foundered with the loss of all hands.
Convention	United Kingdom	The ship ran aground in the Rabbit Islands, Ottoman Empire. She was on a voyage from Odesa to Queenstown, County Cork. She was refloated the next day and resumed her voyage.

== 15 August ==
List of shipwrecks: August 1852
Ship	State	Description
Avon	United Kingdom	The ship was driven ashore and wrecked at Camber, Sussex.
Bodiam Castle	United Kingdom	The ship was wrecked in Stuys Bay with the loss of seven of her crew. She was on a voyage from Algoa Bay to London.
Lucerne	United Kingdom	The ship ran aground at Lancaster, Lancashire. She was on a voyage from Quebec City, Province of Canada, British North America to Lanaster.
Two Brothers	(United Kingdom of Great Britain and Ireland) Jersey	The sloop foundered in the English Channel off Start Point, Devon. She was on a voyage from Jersey to Exmouth, Devon.

== 16 August ==
List of shipwrecks: 16 August 1852
Ship	State	Description
Aimwell	United Kingdom	The ship was driven ashore and wrecked in Algoa Bay. Her crew were rescued.
Amazon	(United Kingdom of Great Britain and Ireland) New Zealand	The whaler, a schooner, was wrecked on the coast of Otago.
Ellen	(United Kingdom of Great Britain and Ireland) New South Wales	The ship was wrecked at Hobart, Van Diemen's Land.
Ernestine	Prussia	The ship was driven ashore at Orfordness, Suffolk, United Kingdom. She was on a voyage from Stettin to London, United Kingdom. She was refloated and taken in to Harwich, Essex, United Kingdom in a leaky condition.
Hopewell	United Kingdom	The ship struck the Carrig Thomas Rock, off the coast of Pembrokeshire and sank. She was on a voyage from Chester, Cheshire to Fishguard, Pembrokeshire.
Two Johns	United Kingdom	The sloop ran aground on the Buxey Sand, in the North Sea off the coast of Essex and was abandoned. She was refloated and taken in to Brightlingsea in a leaky condition.

== 17 August ==
List of shipwrecks: 17 August 1852
Ship	State	Description
Cleopatra	United Kingdom	The ship struck a sunken rock and was wrecked at Amoy, China.
T J Southard	France	The ship was driven ashore on Fire Island, New York, United States.
Unnamed	Flag unknown	The schooner collided with the clipper Coringa (United States) and sank 40 nautical miles (74 km) off Cape Ann, Massachusetts, United States.

== 18 August ==
List of shipwrecks: 18 August 1852
Ship	State	Description
Deborah	United Kingdom	The schooner ran aground at Helsingør, Denmark. She was on a voyage from Newcastle upon Tyne, Northumberland to Memel, Prussia. She was refloated and taken in to Helsingør.
Glenburn	United Kingdom	The ship was driven ashore near the Nakkehead Lighthouse, Denmark. She was on a voyage from Matanzas, Cuba to Saint Petersburg, Russia.
Honor	United Kingdom	The ship ran aground on the Kish Bank, in the Irish Sea. She was on a voyage from Le Croisic, Loire-Inférieure to Dublin. She was refloated and taken in to Dublin.
Pioneer	United States	The steamship was wrecked at San Simeon, California with the loss of twenty lives. She was on a voyage from New York to San Francisco, California.

== 19 August ==
List of shipwrecks: 19 August 1852
Ship	State	Description
Eu	United Kingdom	The brigantine was driven ashore and wrecked at Cascumpec, Prince Edward Island, British North America. She was on a voyage from Richibucto, New Brunswick, British North America to Liverpool, Lancashire.
Friends	United Kingdom	The brig collided with the schooner Mary and Maria (United Kingdom) and sank in the River Thames She was on a voyage from Middlesbrough, Yorkshire to London.
Prince George	United Kingdom	The ship ran aground at Moulmein, Burma. She was on a voyage from Moulmein to a British port. She was refloated and resumed her voyage.
St. Andrew	United Kingdom	The ship was driven ashore and wrecked at Skinningrove, Yorkshire.

== 20 August ==
List of shipwrecks: 20 August 1852
Ship	State	Description
Atlantic	United States	The steamship collided with the steamship Ogdensburg (United States) in fog and sank in Lake Erie with the loss of 130–250 lives. 250 people were rescued by Ogdensburg.
Domestic	United Kingdom	The ship was driven ashore at "Namazia", Ottoman Empire. She was on a voyage from Liverpool, Lancashire to Galaţi, Ottoman Empire. She was refloated with assistance from Brothers (United Kingdom).
Friends	United Kingdom	The brig was run into by the schooner Mary Maria and sank in the River Thames .
Hoogly	United States	The medium clipper ran aground near Shanghai, China. She was a total loss.
Seagull	United Kingdom	The steamship ran aground off Brielle, South Holland, Netherlands.
Veronica	United Kingdom	The schooner sprang a leak and foundered in the North Sea 8 nautical miles (15 km) off Hartlepool, County Durham. Her crew were rescued. She was on a voyage from Grangemouth, Stirlingshire to Bridport, Dorset.

== 21 August ==
List of shipwrecks: 21 August 1852
Ship	State	Description
Endeavour	United Kingdom	The ship was run down and sunk in the English Channel off Dungeness, Kent. She was on a voyage from King's Lynn, Norfolk to Southampton, Hampshire.
Euphemia	United Kingdom	The brig ran aground on the Maplin Sand, in the North Sea off the coast of Essex. She was refloated with the assistance of two smacks and sailed for the River Thames.
Minerva	Sweden	The barque was driven ashore at Cape Janissary, Ottoman Empire. She was refloated with assistance from Queen of Greece (Flag unknown).
Troika	Russia	The ship was driven ashore at Barber's Point, in the Dardanelles. She was on a voyage from Odesa to Falmouth, Cornwall or Queenstown, County Cork, United Kingdom. She was refloated.
Wrestler	United Kingdom	The ship was driven ashore in the Gulf of Smyrna. She was on a voyage from Smyrna to Constantinople, Ottoman Empire. She had been refloated by 17 September.

== 22 August ==
List of shipwrecks: 22 August 1852
Ship	State	Description
Adelaide	Spain	The schooner was dismasted in the Gulf of Florida. she was on a voyage from Havana, Cuba to the Leeward Islands. She was towed in to Key West, Florida, United States, where she was condemned.
Crown	(United Kingdom of Great Britain and Ireland) British North America	The schooner was driven ashore at Chelsea, Massachusetts.
Jessie	United Kingdom	The ship ran aground off Hogänäs, Sweden. She was on a voyage from Cardiff, Glamorgan to Danzig. She was refloated and resumed her voyage.

== 23 August ==
List of shipwrecks: 23 August 1852
Ship	State	Description
Calliope	Russia	The barque was driven ashore in the Dardanelles. She was refloated with assistance from Queen of Greece (Flag unknown).
Carl Robert	Russia	The ship was wrecked at Alexandria, Egypt. She was on a voyage from Cardiff, Glamorgan, United Kingdom to Alexandria.
Fortunato	Kingdom of Sardinia	The abandoned brig was driven ashore at Manasquan, New Jersey, United states. She was on a voyage from Genoa to New York, United States.
Lamnechina	Netherlands	The ship was driven ashore at "Wangsea", Denmark. She was on a voyage from Rotterdam, South Holland to Saint Petersburg, Russia.
Sarah	United Kingdom	The ship was wrecked on the Loo Key. She was on a voyage from Cuba to Quebec City, Province of Canada, British North America.
Zuiderzee	Netherlands	The ship ran aground off Texel, North Holland. She was on a voyage from Matanzas, Cuba to Amsterdam, North Holland. She was refloated and towed in to Amsterdam by the steamship Lord John Russel (United Kingdom).

== 25 August ==
List of shipwrecks: 25 August 1852
Ship	State	Description
Mayoress	United Kingdom	The ship was wrecked on the Niding Reef, in the Baltic Sea. Her crew were rescued.

== 26 August ==
List of shipwrecks: 26 August 1852
Ship	State	Description
Christiane	Stralsund	The ship was wrecked on Nexø, Denmark. Her crew were rescued. She was on a voyage from Rügenwalde, Prussia to Copenhagen, Denmark.
Dove	United Kingdom	The schooner struck the Finish Rock, off the Aran Islands, County Galway and sank. Her crew were rescued. She was on a voyage from Galway to Dundalk, County Louth.
Odin	United Kingdom	The ship ran aground on the Insand, in the North Sea. She was refloated and resumed her voyage.
HMS Vestal	Royal Navy	The Vestal-class frigate ran aground on the Hamstead Ledge, west of The Needles, Isle of Wight. She was on a voyage from Portsmouth, Hampshire to the West Indies. She was refloated and put back to Portsmouth for inspection and repairs.

== 27 August ==
List of shipwrecks: 27 August 1852
Ship	State	Description
Madura	United Kingdom	The barque was wrecked on an uncharted coral reef off the Andaman Islands. Her crew were rescued by the barque Clarendon (United Kingdom). Madura was on a voyage from Moulmein, Burma to a British port.

== 28 August ==
List of shipwrecks: 28 August 1852
Ship	State	Description
Integrity	United Kingdom	The ship ran aground on the Maypoon Sand, off the coast of Burma. She was on a voyage from Moulmein, Burma to a British port. She was refloated.
Jane Archibald	United Kingdom	The schooner was driven ashore in the Dardanelles. She was on a voyage from Constantinople, Ottoman Empire to Falmouth, Cornwall or Queenstown, County Cork. She was refloated, and resumed her voyage on 30 August.
Stettin	Stettin	The steamship ran aground on the Droogden. She was on a voyage from Stettin to Königsberg, Prussia. She was refloated on 1 September and taken in to Stettin in a leaky condition

== 29 August ==
List of shipwrecks: 29 August 1852
Ship	State	Description
Alfred	United Kingdom	The ship was driven ashore and wrecked on Miscou Island, New Brunswick, British North America. She was on a voyage from Leith, Lothian to Dalhousie, New Brunswick.
Charles	United Kingdom	The ship was destroyed by fire in the White Sea off the mouth of the Panoi River. She was on a voyage from Arkhangelsk, Russia to Hartlepool, County Durham.
Elizabeth	United Kingdom	The ship ran aground in the Droogden. She was on a voyage from Torrevieja, Spain to Königsberg, Prussia. She was refloated and taken in to Helsingør, Denmark in a leaky condition.
The Beeswing	United Kingdom	The pilot coble capsized off Souter Point, County Durham with the loss of two of the three people on board.

== 30 August ==
List of shipwrecks: 30 August 1852
Ship	State	Description
Erin	United Kingdom	The schooner foundered in Morecambe Bay. Her six crew survived.
Otterburn	United Kingdom	The ship ran aground off Queenstown, County Cork. She was on a voyage from Queenstown to Liverpool, Lancashire. She was refloated and resumed her voyage.
Syprian	Norway	The barque ran aground on the Hammermollen. She was on a voyage from London, United Kingdom to Piteå or Umeå, Sweden. She was refloated with the assistance of the steamship Hertha (Denmark).
William Prowse	United Kingdom	The ship ran aground at Mauritius. She was on a voyage from Madras, India to Mauritius. She was refloated and taken in to Mauritius.

== 31 August ==
List of shipwrecks: 31 August 1852
Ship	State	Description
Esperance	United Kingdom	The ship ran aground in the Sound of Kyleakin. She was on a voyage from Kronstadt, Russia to Liverpool, Lancashire. She was refloated and taken in to Kyleakin, Isle of Skye, Outer Hebrides.
Janet Wilson	United Kingdom	The ship struck a sunken rock off Girvan, Ayrshire. She was on a voyage from the Clyde to Singapore. She consequently put in to Troon, Ayrshire.
Stephen Burney	United Kingdom	The ship was wrecked near Beaver Harbour, Nova Scotia, British North America. She was on a voyage from Jamaica to Quebec City, Province of Canada, British North America.

== Unknown date ==
List of shipwrecks: Unknown date August 1852
Ship	State	Description
Amazon	(United Kingdom of Great Britain and Ireland) New Zealand	The whaling schooner was wrecked at The Bluff while entering port near the beginning of August. All hands were saved.
Candace	United Kingdom	The ship was driven ashore on the coast of Russia. She was on a voyage from Taganrog to an English port. She was refloated and taken in to Kertch for repairs, arriving on 24 August.
Chieftain	United States	The schooner was in collision with the schooner Harriet (United States) and was abandoned off Matinicus Isle, Maine. She was on a voyage from Digby, Nova Scotia, British North America to Boston, Massachusetts.
City of Melbourne	(United Kingdom of Great Britain and Ireland) Victoria	The steamship was wrecked on King Island, Van Diemen's Land. All on board were rescued. She was on a voyage from Melbourne to Launceston.
Colon	France	The ship was in collision with another vessel and sank before 26 August. Her crew were rescued by Jean Hackette (France). Colon was on a voyage from Guadeloupe to Nantes, Loire-Inférieure.
Commodore	United Kingdom	The brig was driven ashore at Pointe-aux-Trembles, Province of Canada, British North America. She was on a voyage from Glasgow, Renfrewshire to Quebec City, Province of Canada. She was later refloated.
Elizabeth	United Kingdom	The ship was wrecked in the Andaman Islands before 7 August. She was on a voyage from Akyab, Burma to Queenstown, County Cork.
Emilie	France	The ship was wrecked on "Augat Island" before 5 August. She was on a voyage from Brest, Finistère to "Laber Haut".
Endeavour	(United Kingdom of Great Britain and Ireland) New South Wales	The ship was lost at Port Stephens.
Geerdina Cornelia	Flag unknown	The ship was driven ashore on the coast of Russia. She was on a voyage from London, United Kingdom to Saint Petersburg, Russia. She had been refloated and towed in to Saint Petersburg by 14 August.
Gustava	Austrian Empire	The brig was driven ashore near Ayia Anna and Nazara Point. she was refloated and resumed her voyage.
Hakon Jarl	Flag unknown	The ship ran aground in the Dardanelles. She was on a voyage from Odesa to an English port.
Louise	France	The brig was driven against a bridge and wrecked at Bordeaux, Gironde with the loss of three of the six people on board. She was being loaded in preparation for her maiden voyage.
Mazeppa	United Kingdom	The ship was wrecked 60 nautical miles (110 km) from Rangoon, Burma.
Mersey	United Kingdom	The ship was driven ashore at Mobile, Alabama, United States.. Declares unseaworthy, she was converted to an accommodation and hospital ship.
Ocean's Bride	United Kingdom	The ship departed from Malta for Palermo, Sicily. No further trace, presumed foundered with the loss of all hands.
Paramatta	United Kingdom	The barque foundered off Cape Horn, Chile. Her crew were rescued by Javas Welvaren (Netherlands). Paramatta was on a voyage from Callao, Peru to an English port.
Peltona	United Kingdom	The ship was driven ashore on Santa Ana Island. She was on a voyage from London to Acapulco, Mexico. She was refloated and put in to Maranhão, Brazil, where she arrived on 7 August.
Robert Centre	United States	The ship caught fire at New York and was scuttled.
Sophia	Stettin	The ship was driven ashore near "Celt Skagen", Denmark. She was on a voyage from Grangemouth, Stirlingshire, United Kingdom to Stettin. She had broken up by 9 August.
Thomas Carty	United Kingdom	The barque was wrecked on "Young's Guano Island", Cape Colony before 29 August. Her crew were rescued.
Waterville	United Kingdom	The ship was lost off Cape Horn. Her crew were rescued by Triton (United Kingdom). Waterville was on a voyage from Liverpool to the Sandwich Islands.
