= Quebec & Ontario Transportation Company =

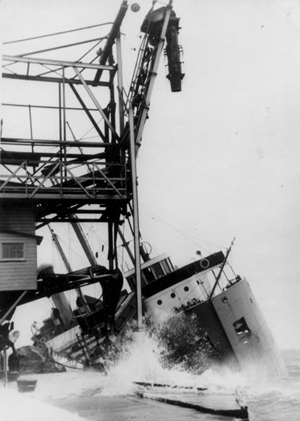
The Outarde, one of the firm's vessels, was seriously damaged in 1946.

The Quebec and Ontario Transportation Company was a shipping firm in Canada prior to the opening of the St Lawrence Seaway.

Their fleet included:

The Quebec & Ontario Transportation Company vessels included
Name	Year of build	horsepower	gross tons	notes
Joseph Medill Paterson ex Baie Comeau	1954	610	2300	
Chicago Tribune	1930	970	2960	
Joseph Medill	1935	1000	2080	Lost with all hands on her delivery voyage from England
Franquelin	1936	1000	2097	Prince Ungava 1964-67/Jean-Talon 1967-74
New York News ex Belvoir	1925	1100	2310	
Outarde ex Brulin	1925	1050	2241	salvaged after several shipwrecks
Shelter Bay ex New York News	1922	800	1670	
Washington Times-Herald ex Imari	1929	750	1940	
Col. Robert R. McCormick ex Manicouagan	1955	610	2314	
Golden Hind	000	000	000	
Dubo International	1998	000	000	

== Relevant History ==
- News bulletin source: Toronto Marine Historical Society
