= Algolake =

Self-unloading bulk carrier

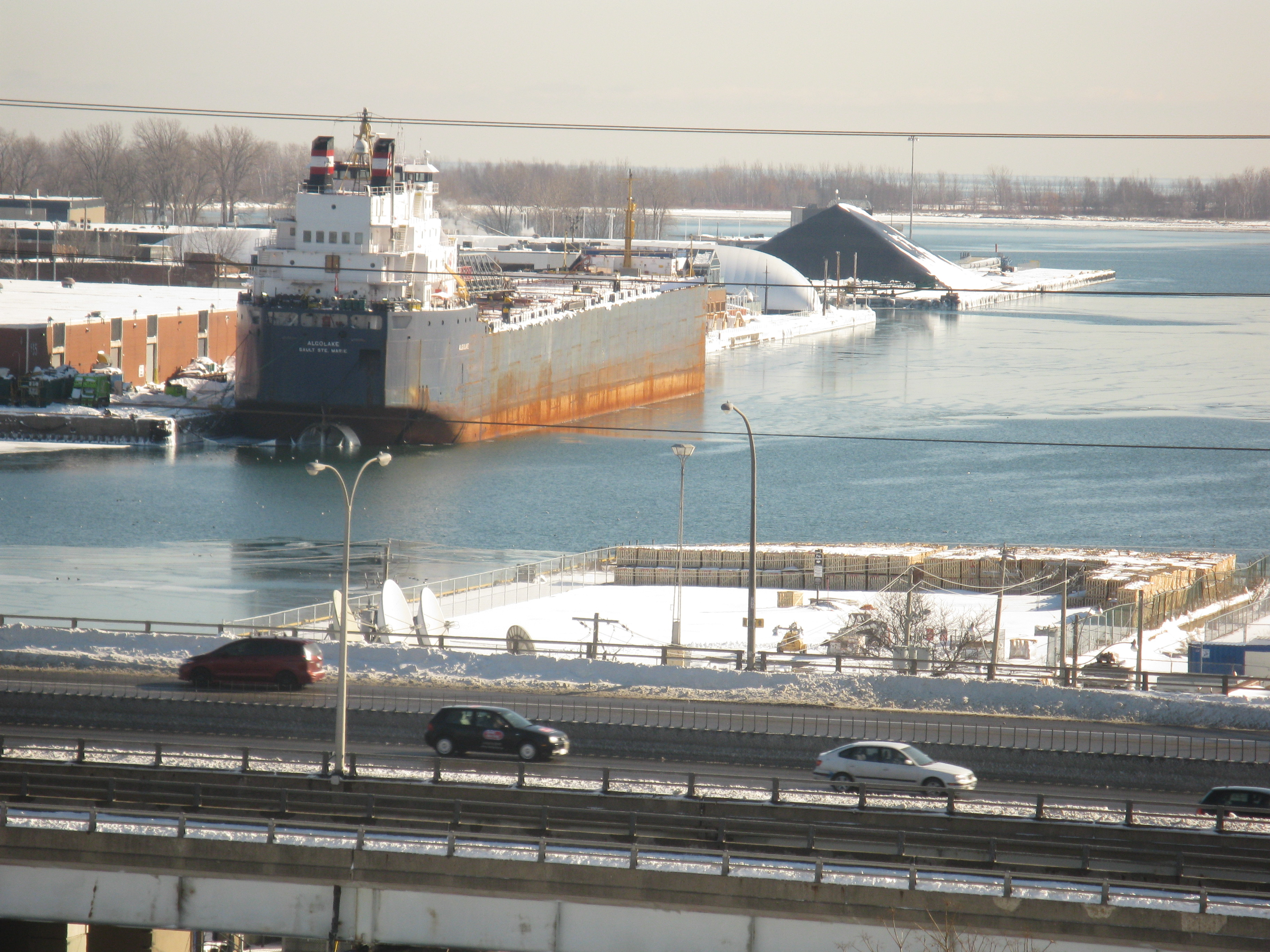
- Algolake moored in Toronto in 2013

History
- Name: Algolake (1977–2018); Gola (2018)
- Owner: Algoma Central
- Operator: Algoma Central
- Builder: Collingwood Shipyards, Collingwood, Ontario
- Yard number: 211
- Launched: 29 October 1976
- Completed: April 1977
- In service: 1977
- Out of service: 2018
- Identification: IMO number: 7423093
- Fate: Sold for scrapping 2018

General characteristics
- Type: Bulk carrier
- Tonnage: 22,851 GT; 31,040 DWT
- Length: 222.5 m (730.0 ft) oa; 216.7 m (711.0 ft) pp
- Beam: 23.0 m (75.5 ft)
- Installed power: 4,500 shp (3,400 kW)
- Propulsion: 1 × shaft, 2 × diesel engines
- Speed: 15 knots (28 km/h; 17 mph)

Algolake was a self-unloading bulk carrier owned and operated by Algoma Central. The ship entered service in 1977 on the Saint Lawrence Seaway. In 1994, the ship ran aground in the St. Lawrence River off Quebec. The ship was laid up for scrapping in 2018, renamed Gola and was later scrapped in Aliağa, Turkey.

== Description ==
Algolake was constructed to seawaymax dimensions. The bulk carrier is 222.5 metres (730.0 ft) long overall and 216.7 metres (711.0 ft) between perpendiculars with a beam of 23.0 metres (75.5 ft). The ship has a tonnage of 22,851 GT and 31,040 DWT. The vessel is powered by two diesel engines creating 4,500 shaft horsepower (3,400 kW) driving one shaft enclosed in a kort nozzle. Algolake has a maximum speed of 15 knots (28 km/h; 17 mph). Algolake has a single superstructure in the stern.

== Service history ==
Algolake was a bulk carrier owned by Algoma Central. She was launched by Collingwood Shipyards at Collingwood, Ontario on 29 October 1976—after lake freighters stopped being built with a distinctive superstructure incorporating the ship's bridge, right up in the bow, and another, over the ship's engines, right in the stern. The ship was completed in April 1977 and entered service on the Saint Lawrence Seaway. Algolake departed on her maiden voyage on 17 April 1977.

On 23 September 1994, Algolake was headed to Detroit, Michigan with a load of iron ore when the ship ran aground in the St. Lawrence River. The vessel was sailing at 8 knots (15 km/h; 9.2 mph) when Algolake ran aground, suffering some damage to her hull. However, no one was injured and no pollution was reported.

According to Soo Today, a life extension for Algolake was one of the reasons why Algoma Central's profits were down sharply in 2009. The ship was laid up for scrapping in 2018. That year, the vessel was sold, renamed Gola and was later scrapped in July at Aliağa, Turkey.
