= MS Birgo =

Coordinates: 59.30°N 5.77°E

History
- Name: Birgo
- Owner: Sameiet Birgo (1967–1977); Kran & Båtservice AS (1977–1978)
- Operator: Lykkes rederi A/S (1967–1977); Kran & Båtservice AS (1977–1978)
- Acquired: 6 November 1967
- Out of service: 18 July 1978
- Fate: Scuttled in Nedstrandfjorden

General characteristics
- Type: Cargo ship
- Tonnage: 880 t
- Length: 56.7 m (186 ft 0 in)
- Propulsion: 850 BHK NORMO Diesel
- Speed: 10.5 knots (19.4 km/h; 12.1 mph)
- Capacity: 296 t

MS Birgo was a Norwegian cargo ship that was built in 1967. The ship sank 18 July 1978 in Nedstrandfjorden (part of Boknafjorden). While the initial investigation was inconclusive, the loss was later determined to be a deliberate scuttling by the ship's owner as an insurance fraud scheme. The litigation by the insurance company in the aftermath of the investigation reached the Supreme Court where the principle of condictio indebiti was tested.

== Early history ==
The ship was built in Trondheim by Ørens Mekansike Værksted and delivered on 6 November 1967. It was at the time the largest ship built by the shipyard. For most of its service life, the ship was owned by Sameiet Birgo, and controlled and operated by the shipping company Lykkes rederi. The ship was a bulk carrier, mainly intended for transportation of ferrosilicon between Norway and Germany. Its route often included sailing on the Rhine and its masts could be folded down in order to pass under bridges. The ship had modern navigational equipment and every crewmember had a separate cabin.

Birgo's first commercial voyage was to Bremen with a load of aluminium from Sunndalsøra, and wood pulp from Flatanger Municipality.

The ship was sold to the Kristiansand-based shipping company Kran & Båtservice in 1977.

== Sinking ==
In the early morning of 18 July 1978, Birgo was sailing in good weather from Sauda to Duisburg with a cargo of ferrosilicon. The owner of the shipping company was also on board the ship.

About one nautical mile (1.9 km; 1.2 mi) northwest of Norheimsøy Island in the Nedstrandfjord the ship's owner deliberately opened a bottom valve and burned holes in the hull with a cutting torch. The ship's machinist discovered the sabotage and confronted the owner but agreed to remain silent after being told that the company was facing bankruptcy and that scuttling the ship was necessary to save jobs.

The ship sank stern first at about 4:00 in the morning at about 700 metres (2,300 ft) depth. All the 8 crew members escaped in a lifeboat, and were rescued by the ship Rygerøy.

== Legal proceedings ==
In the initial investigative hearing it was speculated that Birgo's loss was due to metal fatigue and problems with the cargo. The ship had suffered minor incidents including a grounding in Kristiansand before Easter that year, and grazed a sand bank in England the previous week. The loss of Birgo remained suspicious but without hard evidence of any wrongdoing, the marine inspector ended the investigation in January 1979.

When the investigation was closed, the insurance company Kystskipsassuransen paid the insurance value of 3.6 million krone to the lien holders Bergen Bank and Paal Wilson & Co and 0.6 million directly to the ship's owners.

In 1980 one of the former crew members disclosed what had happened during a drinking party. This revelation was brought forward to the authorities and the case was reopened. In August 1980, Birgo's machinist reported what had happened to the police.

The machinist was tried for complicity in the insurance fraud and vandalism. The criminal case against him was finally decided by the Supreme Court in May 1982 which sentenced him to a six-month suspended jail sentence and imposed a 10,000 krone fine. While his cover-up was culpable, the majority deemed his role in the actual sabotage and fraud scheme to be minor, and he was credited for having contributed to the investigation.

The ship's owner was tried by the Ryfylke trial court in 1983. He was convicted for the sabotage and fraud scheme and sentenced to 18 months in prison. He was also ordered to reimburse the insurance payment of 4.2 million by Kystassuransen for the ship and 1.6 million to Vega for its cargo. The sentence was upheld by the Lagmannsrett (court of appeal) in 1984.

The ship's insurer claimed reimbursement from the lien holders, and a civil lawsuit was filed. The Bergen city court dismissed the case, but on appeal the Lagmannsrett ruled in favor of the insurance company. This ruling was upheld by the Supreme Court in 1985. The civil case tested the bounds of condictio indebiti. The lien holders' interest in believing a payment was rightfully theirs was balanced against the insurance company's right to undo a wrongful payment. In this matter, the lien holders had acted in good faith, but this was outweighed by the fact that the payment came as a result of a criminal act. The reimbursement claim came 19 months after the payment, as soon as the insurance company had been made aware of the fraud. This was not considered an undue length of time. Since the lien holders were professional finance companies they were more liable to a reimbursement claim.

== Bibliography and external links ==
- MS Birgo skipshistorie.net
- "Rt-1985-290" (in Norwegian). 9 March 1985. (1985 Supreme Court ruling)
- Bakkevig, Erik (2003). Skipsforlis gjennom tidene - fra Skudeneshavn til Bømlahuk. ISBN 82-303-0098-4.
