= CSL Tecumseh =

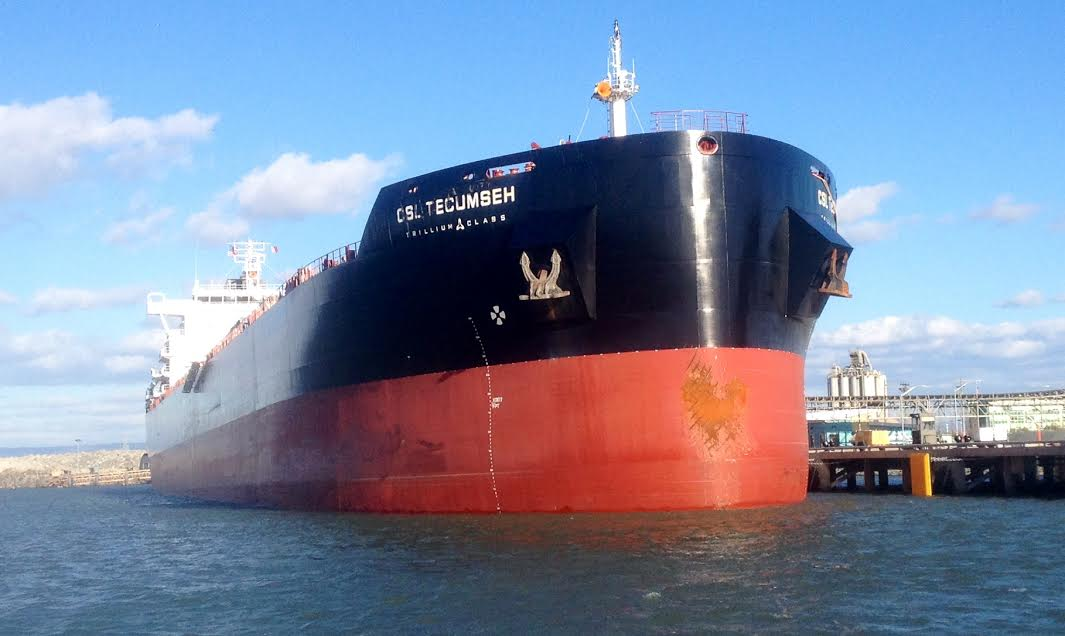
- CSL Tecumseh

History
- Name: CSL Tecumseh
- Owner: Canada Steamship Lines
- Operator: Canada Steamship Lines
- Port of registry: Nassau (The Bahamas)
- Builder: Chengxi Shipyard
- Launched: 6 September 2012
- Completed: May 2013
- Identification: IMO number: 9600994
- Status: in active service

General characteristics
- Class & type: Trillium-class freighter
- Tonnage: 43,691 GT; 71,319 DWT
- Length: 228.6 m (750 ft 0 in)
- Beam: 32.26 m (105 ft 10 in)
- Draught: 13.517 m (44 ft 4.2 in)
- Depth: 20.16 m (66 ft 2 in)
- Capacity: 71,476 m^{3} (2,524,200 cu ft)

CSL Tecumseh is a self-unloading Panamax bulk carrier that entered service with Canada Steamship Lines (CSL) in 2013. The ship is currently registered in Nassau, Bahamas.

== Design and description ==
CSL Tecumseh is the second of three sister ships of the Trillium-class freighters of the Panamax sub class. The ship has a gross tonnage of 43,691 tonnes and a deadweight tonnage of 71,319 tonnes. The ship is 228.6 metres (750 ft 0 in) long overall with a beam of 32.26 metres (105 ft 10 in). The ship has a maximum draught of 13.517 metres (44 ft 4.2 in) and a depth of 20.16 metres (66 ft 2 in).

The bulk carrier has a hold capacity of 71,476 cubic metres (2,524,200 cu ft) and an 80-metre (260 ft) boom for self-discharging.

== Construction and career ==
CSL Tecumseh was built by Chengxi Shipyard in Jiangyin, China with the yard number 9703. She was completed in May 2013. The ship was delivered to CSL on 2 May 2013 and she began her maiden voyage on 7 May from China to Port McNeill, British Columbia, where she loaded a cargo of aggregates, to San Francisco, California.
