= Trillium-class freighter =

Series of Panamax and lake bulk carriers

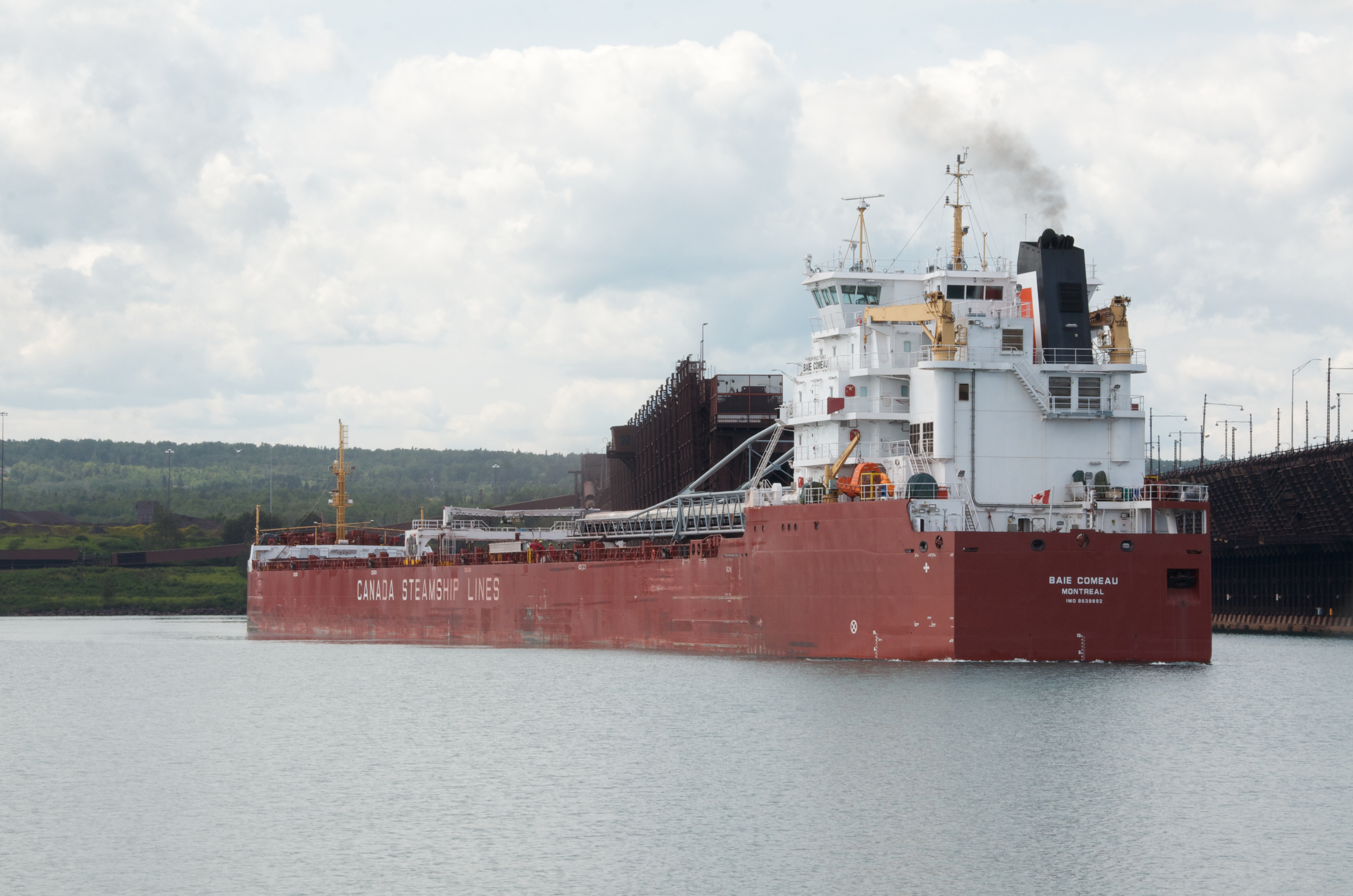
- Trillium lake freighter, Baie Comeau leaving Two Harbors, Minnesota

Class overview
- Name: Trillium class
- Builders: Chengxi Shipyard, Jiangyin
- Operators: Canada Steamship Lines
- Subclasses: Trillium Laker; Trillium Panamax
- Planned: 9
- Completed: 9
- Active: 9

General characteristics
- Type: Lake freighter/Bulk carrier
- Tonnage: 22,597 GT-24,430 GT; 36,417 DWT-37,690 DWT
- Length: 225.5 m (739 ft 10 in)
- Beam: 23.76 m (77 ft 11 in)
- Draught: 9 m (29 ft 6 in)
- Installed power: 1 × IMO Tier II MAN B&W 6S50ME diesel engine, 8,750 kW (11,730 hp)
- Propulsion: 1 shaft
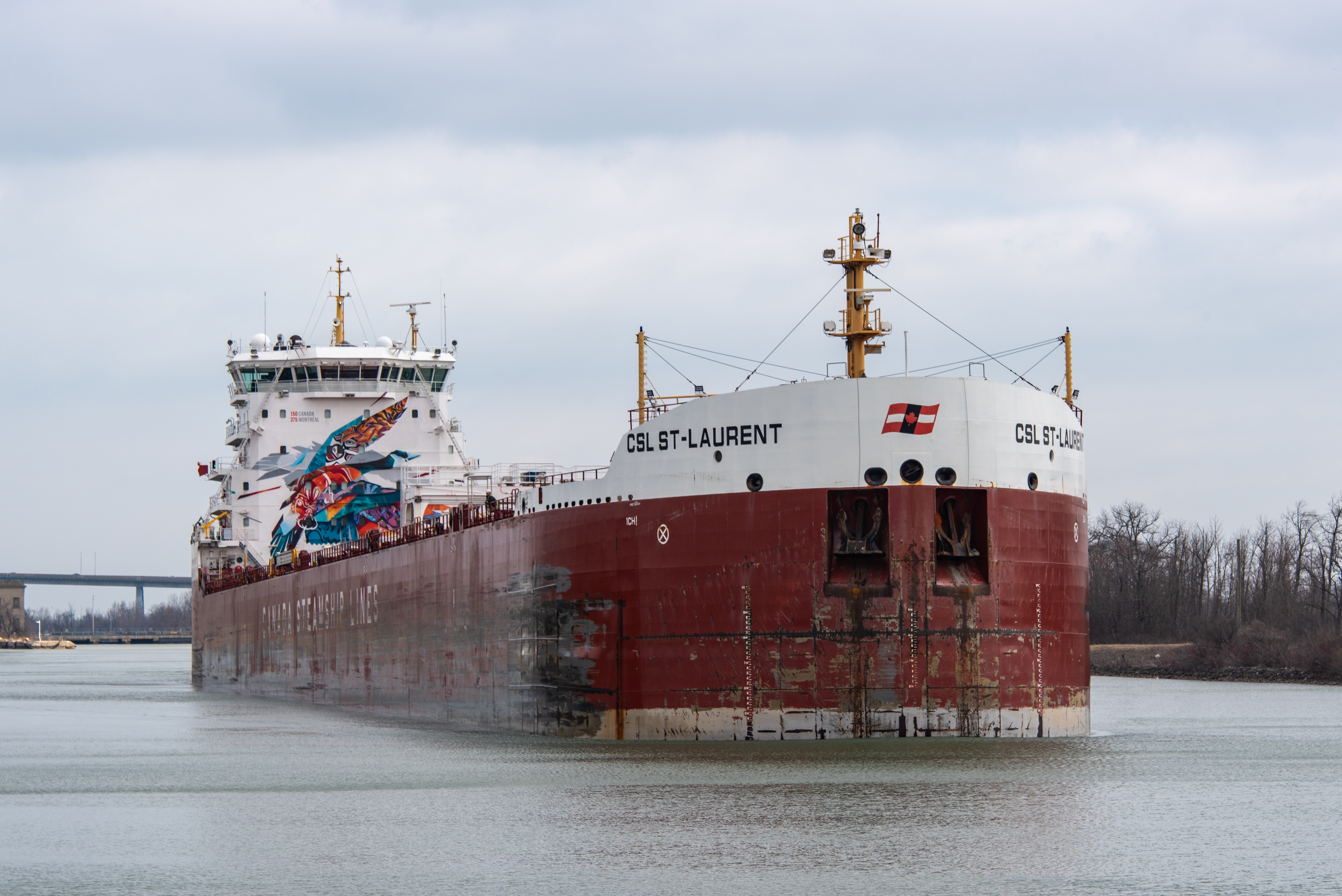
- Trillium bulk carrier, CSL St-Laurent in the Welland Canal, Canada

General characteristics
- Type: Panamax bulk carrier
- Tonnage: 43,691 GT; 71,405.30 DWT
- Length: 228.6 m (750 ft 0 in)
- Beam: 32.26 m (105 ft 10 in)
- Draught: 13.517 m (44 ft 4.2 in)
- Depth: 20.16 m (66.1 ft)
- Installed power: 1 × IMO Tier II Man B&W 5S65ME-C diesel engine; 10,430 kW (13,990 hp)
- Propulsion: 1 × 1,500 kW (2,000 hp) bow thruster
- Capacity: 75,125 m^{3} (2,653,000 cu ft)
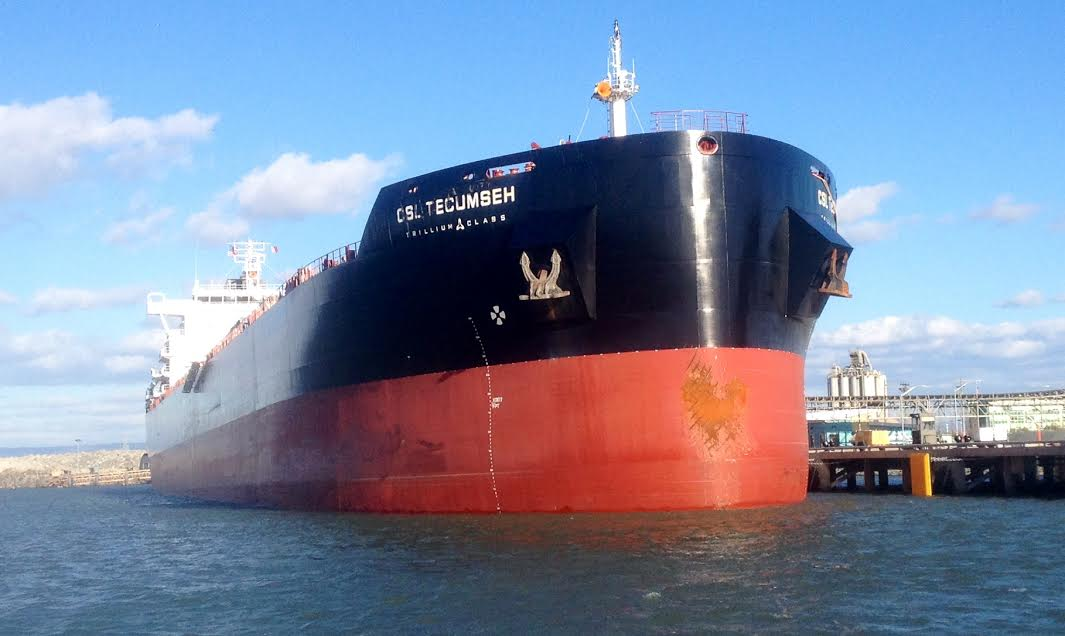
- CSL Tecumseh, a Panamax freighter

The Trillium class is a series of freighters owned by Canada Steamship Lines (CSL). The class is divided into three subclasses; the self-discharging lake freighters, the lake bulk carriers, and the Panamax self-discharging bulk carriers. Initially a nine-ship building program, six are operated by Canada Steamship Lines for use on the Great Lakes, while three are operated by CSL Americas for international trade. Two more ships were acquired later for use by CSL Americas.

== Background ==
In the early 2000s, Canada Steamship Lines enquired at several shipyards concerning the availability of shipyard space for the construction of several self-discharging vessels. They were turned down by yards in China, Japan, Korea and Europe due to high demand for conventional designs. In 2008, due to the strong Canadian dollar and yard availability in China, Canada Steamship Lines began the design of the class for the eventual order to be placed in 2010. These orders were placed after the Canadian government had repealed taxes on ship construction outside of Canada.

The construction of the Trillium class, along with Algoma Central's Equinox class, is the largest addition of new vessels to fleets that work the Saint Lawrence Seaway since its opening in 1959.

== Trillium Laker ==
=== Lake freighter ===
Four Trillium-class self-discharging lake freighters and two bulk carriers were ordered in 2010 as part of a nine-ship program. The lake freighters were constructed by Chengxi shipyard in Jiangyin, China. They were designed for environmental and operational efficiency.

The Trillium self-discharging lakers have a gross tonnage (GT) of 24,430 tons. According to the Miramar Ship Index the vessels have a deadweight tonnage (DWT) of 37,690 tons. However, on the CSL website, the vessels are stated as having a GT of 24,430 and DWT of 34,500 tons. According to the Miramar Ship Index Baie Comeau has a gross tonnage (GT) of 32,000 tons.

The ships are 225.5 metres (739 ft 10 in) long overall with a beam of 23.76 metres (77 ft 11 in). They have a maximum draught of 9 metres (30 ft). The vessels are powered by one IMO Tier II MAN B&W 6S50ME diesel engine driving one shaft creating 8,750 kilowatts (11,730 hp). They have fixed pitch thrusters in the bow and stern.

The lake freighters are equipped with five holds and have a net hold capacity of 41,917.96 cubic metres (1,480,319 cu ft). The vessels have an average unloading rate of 5,450 tonnes (5,360 long tons; 6,010 short tons) per hour. CSL asserts that the new vessels will be more efficient than existing vessels, and will leave less pollution.

Baie St. Paul was the first of the four lakers to be delivered in 2012. The ship was given an industry award shortly after delivery. For her ocean transit to North America, Baie St. Paul was fitted with temporary structures within the ship that were removed upon arrival at Montreal, Quebec. Whitefish Bay was the second ship in the class to be delivered. Thunder Bay was delivered to CSL on 16 May 2013. She was the third of the class to join the Great Lakes fleet. Baie Comeau was the final ship in the class to be delivered.

=== Bulk carrier ===
Two Trillium-class bulk carriers were ordered as part of a nine-ship building program started 2010, both were completed for CSL in 2014. Classified as LR 100A1 Great Lakes Bulk Carrier, the ships have a gross tonnage of 22,579 tons. CSL St-Laurent has a deadweight tonnage of 36,363 tons and CSL Welland has a deadweight tonnage of 36,417 tons. The ships are 225.5 metres (739 ft 10 in) long overall with a beam of 23.76 metres (77 ft 11 in). CSL Welland has a maximum draught of 9 metres (29 ft 6 in). Both ships have five holds.

CSL Welland and CSL St-Laurent were constructed by Yangfan Shipyard in Zhoushan, China. CSL Welland was named for the Welland Canal. The ship departed China on 5 November 2014 for Montreal. CSL St-Laurent transports minerals from Côte-Nord, Quebec and grains from Western Canada.

== Trillium Panamax ==
Three Panamax self-discharging bulk carriers were ordered as part of the 2010 nine-ship building program by Canada Steamship Lines. The three vessels were constructed at Chengxi Shipyard in Jiangyin, China along with two others of the same design constructed for Torvald Klaveness of Norway under CSL supervision.

The vessels have a GT of 43,691 tons and a DWT of 71,319 tons. The ships are 228.6 metres (750 ft 0 in) long overall with a beam of 32.26 metres (105 ft 10 in). They have a maximum draught of 13.517 metres (44 ft 4.2 in) and a depth of 20.16 metres (66 ft 2 in). The bulk carriers have a hold capacity of 71,476 cubic metres (2,524,200 cu ft) and an 80-metre (260 ft) boom for self-discharging.

Rt. Hon. Paul E. Martin sailed on her maiden voyage on 5 October 2012 from China to Port Sechelt, British Columbia.

== Ships in class ==
Trillium class
Name	Builder	Launched	Completed	Status
Lake freighter
Baie St. Paul	Chengxi Shipyard, Jiangyin		September 2012	In active service
Baie Comeau	Chengxi Shipyard, Jiangyin		June 2013	In active service
Whitefish Bay	Chengxi Shipyard, Jiangyin		May 2013	In active service
Thunder Bay	Chengxi Shipyard, Jiangyin		May 2013	In active service
Lake bulk carrier
CSL Welland	Yangfan Group, Zhoushan	25 January 2014	November 2014	In active service
CSL St-Laurent	Yangfan Group, Zhoushan		December 2014	In active service
Panamax bulk carrier
CSL Tecumseh	Chengxi Shipyard, Jiangyin		May 2013	In active service
Rt. Hon. Paul E. Martin	Chengxi Shipyard, Jiangyin		September 2012	In active service
CSL Tacoma	Chengxi Shipyard, Jiangyin		October 2013	In active service
CSL Tarantau (ex-Balto)	Chengxi Shipyard, Jiangyin		May 2013	In active service
Algoma Vision (ex-Balchen)	Chengxi Shipyard, Jiangyin		September 2013	In active service
