= Baie St. Paul (2012 ship) =

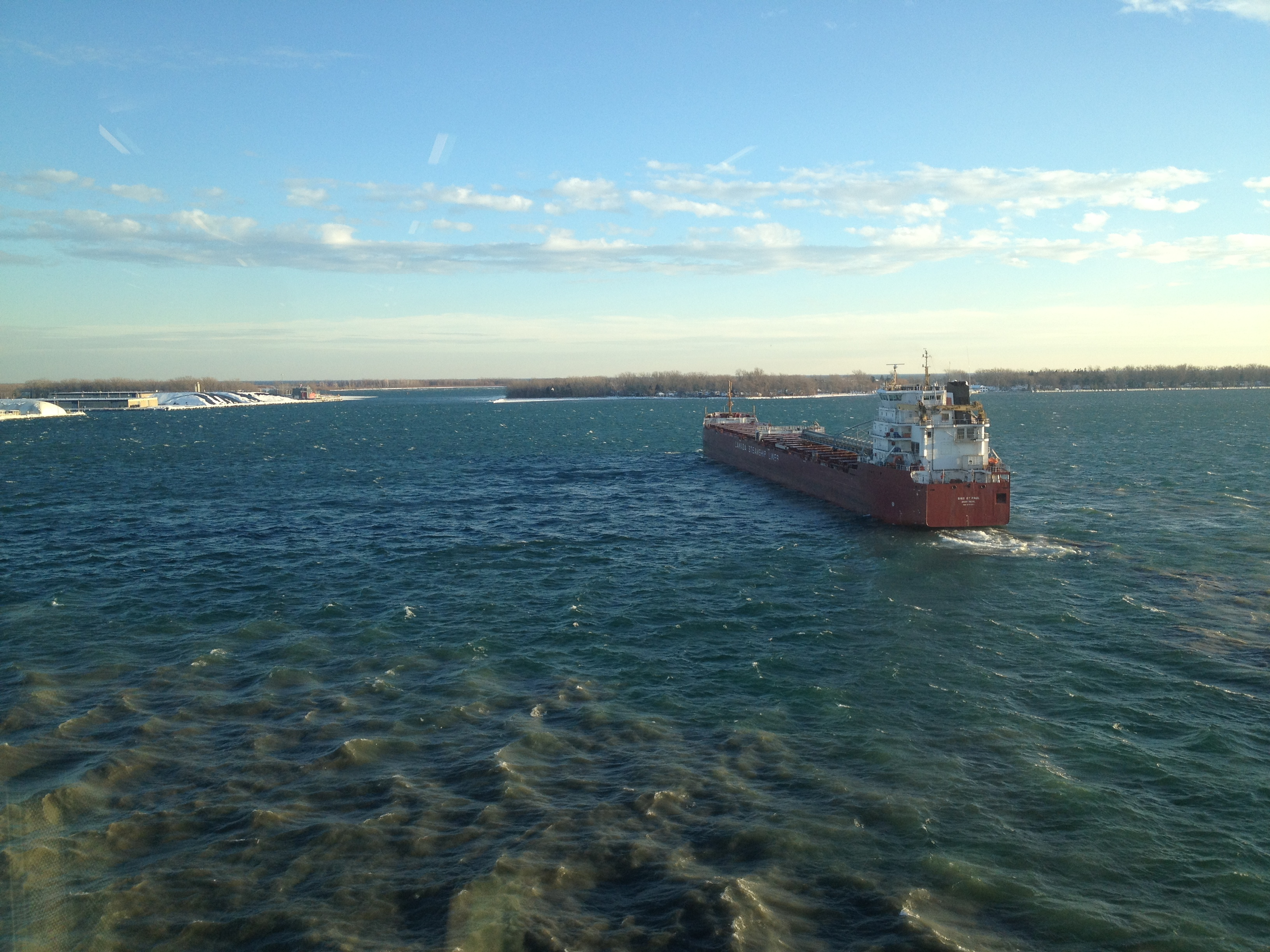
- Baie St. Paul on Lake Ontario

History
- Name: Baie St. Paul
- Operator: Canada Steamship Lines
- Port of registry: Canada
- Builder: Chengxi Shipyard, Jiangyin
- Yard number: 9301
- Completed: September 2012
- Identification: IMO number: 9601027; MMSI number: 316022391; Callsign: CFN6120
- Status: in active service

General characteristics
- Class & type: Trillium-class freighter
- Tonnage: 24,430 GT; 37,690 DWT
- Length: 225.5 m (739 ft 10 in)
- Beam: 23.76 m (77 ft 11 in)
- Draught: 9 m (30 ft)
- Depth: 14.75 m (48 ft 5 in)
- Installed power: 1 x IMO Tier III MAN B&W 6S50ME diesel engine, 8,750 kW (11,730 hp)
- Propulsion: 1 shaft
- Capacity: 41,917.96 m^{3} (1,480,319 cu ft)
- Crew: 15–18

Baie St. Paul is a Trillium-class lake freighter operated on the Great Lakes by the Canada Steamship Lines (CSL). The ship entered service in 2012.

== Design and description ==
Baie St. Paul has a gross tonnage of 24,430 tons and a deadweight tonnage of 37,690 tons according to the Miramar Ship Index. However, according to the CSL website, Baie St. Paul has the same gross tonnage but the ship has a deadweight tonnage of 34,500 tons. The vessel is 225.5 metres (739 ft 10 in) long overall with a beam of 23.76 metres (77 ft 11 in). The ship has a depth of 14.75 metres (48 ft 5 in) and a maximum draught of 9 metres (30 ft). The vessel has a crew of 15–18.

The freighter is powered by one IMO Tier III MAN B&W 6S50ME diesel engine driving one shaft creating 8,750 kilowatts (11,730 hp). The ship has five holds and has a capacity of 41,917.96 cubic metres (1,480,319 cu ft).

== Service history ==
The vessel was built at the Chengxi Shipyard in Jiangyin, China with the yard number 9301. The ship was completed in September 2012, the first vessel in CSL's Trillium class. Her sister ships are Baie Comeau, Whitefish Bay and Thunder Bay. CSL asserted that the new vessels would be more efficient than existing vessels, and would produce less pollution.

CSL operated an earlier vessel called the Baie St. Paul, launched in 1962. She was scrapped in 1995.
