= Lists of ships =

Lists of ships include:

== Commercial vessels ==
=== Cargo ships ===
- List of Bangladesh-flagged cargo ships
- List of Greece-flagged cargo ships
- List of Liberia-flagged cargo ships
- List of Malta-flagged cargo ships
- List of Panama-flagged cargo ships
- List of Russia-flagged cargo ships
- List of bulk carriers
- List of container ships

=== Empire ships ===
- List of Empire ships (A)
- List of Empire ships (B)
- List of Empire ships (Ca–Cl)
- List of Empire ships (Co–Cy)
- List of Empire ships (D)
- List of Empire ships (E)
- List of Empire ships (F)
- List of Empire ships (G)
- List of Empire ships (H)
- List of Empire ships (I–J)
- List of Empire ships (K)
- List of Empire ships (L)
- List of Empire ships (M)
- List of Empire ships (N)
- List of Empire ships (O)
- List of Empire ships (P)
- List of Empire ships (R)
- List of Empire ships (Sa–Sh)
- List of Empire ships (Si–Sy)
- List of Empire ships (Ta–Te)
- List of Empire ships (Th–Ty)
- List of Empire ships (U–Z)
- List of Empire ships built in the United States

=== Liberty ships ===
- List of Liberty ships (A)
- List of Liberty ships (B)
- List of Liberty ships (C)
- List of Liberty ships (D)
- List of Liberty ships (E)
- List of Liberty ships (F)
- List of Liberty ships (G)
- List of Liberty ships (H)
- List of Liberty ships (I)
- List of Liberty ships (Ja–Je)
- List of Liberty ships (J. F–J. W)
- List of Liberty ships (K)
- List of Liberty ships (L)
- List of Liberty ships (M)
- List of Liberty ships (N)
- List of Liberty ships (O)
- List of Liberty ships (P)
- List of Liberty ships (R)
- List of Liberty ships (S–Samtyne)
- List of Liberty ships (Samuel–Sy)
- List of Liberty ships (T)
- List of Liberty ships (U–V)
- List of Liberty ships (W–William G)
- List of Liberty ships (William H–Wy)
- List of Liberty ships (Z)
- List of United States Navy ships
- List of Royal Navy ships
- List of ships of the Imperial Japanese Navy
- List of U.S. military vessels named after living Americans
- List of U.S. military vessels named after women

=== Other ships ===
- List of civilian nuclear ships
- List of classic vessels
- List of cruise ships
- List of largest ferries of Europe
- List of gas carriers
- List of icebreakers
- List of lightvessels
- List of ocean liners
- List of research vessels by country
- List of river cruise ships
- List of slave ships
- List of Sydney Harbour ferries
- List of tankers
- Canadian Merchant Navy § Fleet

== By company ==
- Canada Steamship Lines § CSL fleet
- List of ships of CP Ships (Canadian Pacific)
- Clan Line § Ships of the Clan Line
- List of ships built by Harland and Wolff
- List of ships built at Hietalahti shipyard
- List of ships of the Illawarra Steam Navigation Company
- List of ships built by John Brown & Company
- List of LB&SCR ships
- List of London and North Western Railway ships
- List of vessels built by Matthew Turner
- List of P&O Ferries ships
- Merchant Navy (United Kingdom)#British shipping companies
- Transdev Sydney Ferries § Fleet

== Fictional ships ==
- List of fictional ships

== Naval ships ==
=== By type ===
- List of aircraft carriers
- List of battleships
- List of cruisers

=== By country ===
- Algeria: List of Algerian ships
- Australia: List of ships of the Royal Australian Navy
- Argentina:
  - List of ships of the Argentine Navy
  - List of auxiliary ships of the Argentine Navy
  - List of active Argentine Navy ships
- Canada:
  - List of ships of the Royal Canadian Navy
  - List of current ships of the Royal Canadian Navy
- China:
  - List of ships of the People's Liberation Army Navy
  - List of ships of the China Coast Guard
- Egypt: List of ships of the Egyptian Navy
- Finland:
  - List of decommissioned ships of the Finnish Navy
  - List of active Finnish Navy ships
- Germany:
  - List of naval ships of Germany
  - List of ships of the Imperial German Navy
  - List of Kriegsmarine ships
  - List of German Federal Navy ships
  - List of German Navy ships
  - List of German Navy ship classes
  - List of U-boats of Germany
  - List of battleships of Germany
- Greece:
  - List of active Hellenic Navy ships
  - List of current Greek frigates
  - List of decommissioned ships of the Hellenic Navy
  - List of Greece-flagged cargo ships
- India:
  - List of ships of the Indian Navy
  - List of active Indian Navy ships
- Ireland: List of Irish state vessels
- Israel: List of ships of the Israeli Navy
- Japan:
  - List of ships of the Imperial Japanese Navy
  - List of active Japan Maritime Self-Defense Force ships
- Mexico: List of ships of the Mexican Navy
- New Zealand: List of ships of the Royal New Zealand Navy
- North Korea: List of active ships of the Korean People's Navy
- Ottoman Empire:
  - List of sailing ships of the Ottoman Empire
  - List of battleships of the Ottoman Empire
- Peru: List of Peruvian Navy ships
- Philippine:
  - List of equipment of the Philippine Navy
  - List of decommissioned ships of the Philippine Navy
- Poland: List of ships of the Polish Navy
- Portugal: List of ships of the Portuguese Navy
- Russia: List of active Russian Navy ships
- South Africa:
  - List of decommissioned ships of the South African Navy
  - List of active South African Navy ships
- Sri Lanka: List of Sri Lanka Navy active ships
- Soviet Union: List of ships of the Soviet Navy
- South Korea: List of ships of the Republic of Korea Navy
- Spain:
  - List of active Spanish Navy ships
  - List of historic Spanish Navy ships
- Taiwan: List of Republic of China Navy ships
- Turkey:
  - List of active ships of the Turkish Naval Forces
  - List of submarines of the Turkish Navy
  - List of major surface ships of the Turkish Navy
  - List of patrol vessels of the Turkish Navy
  - List of amphibious warfare vessels of the Turkish Navy
  - List of mine warfare vessels of the Turkish Navy
  - List of miscellaneous ships of the Turkish Navy
- Ukraine:
  - List of active Ukrainian Navy ships
  - List of former warships of the Ukrainian Navy
- United Kingdom:
  - List of active Royal Navy ships
  - List of ship names of the Royal Navy
  - List of early warships of the English navy
  - List of warships of the Scots Navy
- United States: List of United States Navy ships
- United Arab Emirates: List of naval ships of the United Arab Emirates
- Vietnam: List of equipment of the Vietnam People's Navy

=== By era ===
- List of ships captured in the 18th century
- List of ships captured in the 19th century
- List of ships of World War II

== By superlative ==
- List of large sailing vessels
- List of large sailing yachts
- List of largest container ships
- List of largest cruise ships
- List of largest ships by gross tonnage
- List of the largest ships hit by U-boats in World War I
- List of longest naval ships
- List of longest ships
- List of longest wooden ships
- List of oldest surviving ships
- List of surviving ancient ships
- Timeline of largest passenger ships

== Sailing ships ==
- List of clipper ships
- List of vessels of the Bombay Marine (1798)
- List of Egyptian sail frigates
- List of early warships of the English navy
- List of sail frigates of France
- List of large sailing vessels
- List of large sailing yachts
- List of schooners
- List of sailing ships of the Ottoman Empire
- List of sailing frigates of the United States Navy
- List of sloops of war of the United States Navy
- List of ships of the line of the United States Navy
- List of ships of the Confederate States Navy
- List of ships of the line of the Royal Navy
- List of Russian sail frigates
- List of Spanish sail frigates
- List of sailing ships of the Venetian navy

== Shipwrecks ==
- Lists of shipwrecks
- List of ships sunk by icebergs
- List of ships sunk by missiles
- List of ships sunk by submarines by death toll
- List of missing ships

== Museum ships ==
- List of museum ships

== See also ==
- List of countries by level of military equipment
- Category:Lists of ship launches
- Category:Lists of ship commissionings
- Category:Lists of ship decommissionings
- Category:Lists of shipwrecks by year
