= List of Bangladesh-flagged cargo ships =

This list of Bangladesh-flagged cargo ships consists of vessels which are registered in Bangladesh and subject to the laws of that country. Any ship which flew the flag at any point in its career, and is present in the encyclopedia, is listed here.

== List of ships ==
Name	Owner	Year built	Type	Gross tonnage	Status
Abdullah	Kabir Steel Re-Rolling Mills	2015	Bulk carrier	32,714	Hijacked by pirates of the coast off Somalia in March 2024.
Banglar Samriddhi	Bangladesh Shipping Corporation	2018	LR-class bulk carrier	25,818	Struck by a missile in the Black Sea during the 2022 Russian invasion of Ukraine, later abandoned.
Hope	Trade Bridge Shipping	1990	General cargo ship	5,550	Capsized off Phuket, Thailand, in rough seas on 4 July 2022.
