= List of Liberty ships (O) =

This is a list of Liberty ships with names beginning with O.

== Description ==
The standard Liberty ship (EC-2-S-C1 type) was a cargo ship 441 feet 6 inches (134.57 m) long overall, with a beam of 56 feet 10 3/4 inches (17.34 m). It had a depth of 37 feet 4 inches (11.38 m) and a draft of 26 feet 10 inches (8.18 m). It was powered by a triple expansion steam engine, which had cylinders of 24 1/2 inches (62 cm), 37 inches (94 cm) and 70 inches (180 cm) diameter by 48 inches (120 cm) stroke. The engine produced 2,500ihp at 76rpm. Driving a four-blade propeller 18 feet 6 inches (5.64 m) in diameter, could propel the ship at 11 knots (20 km/h).

Cargo was carried in five holds, numbered 1–5 from bow to stern. Grain capacity was 84,183 cubic feet (2,383.8 m^{3}), 145,604 cubic feet (4,123.0 m^{3}), 96,429 cubic feet (2,730.6 m^{3}), 93,190 cubic feet (2,639 m^{3}) and 93,190 cubic feet (2,639 m^{3}), with a further 49,086 cubic feet (1,390.0 m^{3}) in the deep tanks. Bale capacity was 75,405 cubic feet (2,135.2 m^{3}), 134,638 cubic feet (3,812.5 m^{3}), 83,697 cubic feet (2,370.0 m^{3}), 82,263 cubic feet (2,329.4 m^{3}) and 82,435 cubic feet (2,334.3 m^{3}), with a further 41,135 cubic feet (1,164.8 m^{3}) in the deep tanks.

It carried a crew of 45, plus 36 United States Navy Armed Guard gunners. Later in the war, this was altered to a crew of 52, plus 29 gunners. Accommodation was in a three deck superstructure placed midships. The galley was equipped with a range, a 25 US gallons (95 L) stock kettle and other appliances. Messrooms were equipped with an electric hot plate and an electric toaster.

== Oahu ==
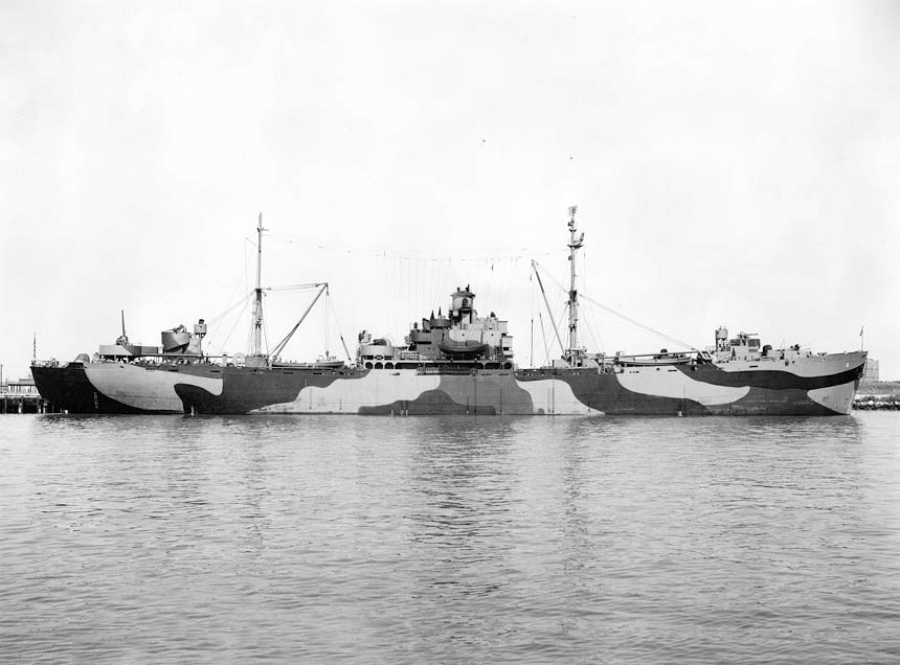
USS Oahu

Oahu was built by Bethlehem Fairfield Shipyard, Baltimore, Maryland. Her keel was laid on 14 August 1943. She was launched as Caleb C. Wheeler on 9 September and delivered to the United States Navy as Oahu on 15 September. A repair ship, she was laid up in reserve at San Diego, California in January 1947. Transferred to Suisun Bay in July 1963. She was scrapped at Tacoma, Washington in June 1979.

== Oakley Wood ==
Oakley Wood was built by Bethlehem Fairfield Shipyard. Her keel was laid on 19 May 1944. She was launched on 19 June and delivered on 30 June. Built for the War Shipping Administration (WSA), she was operated under the management of American-West African Line. Management transferred to States Marine Corp. in 1946. Sold to her managers in 1947 and renamed Keystone State. Sold in 1955 to United Steamship Corp. and renamed Georges Fribourg. Reflagged to Panama and operated under the management of Arrow Steamship Co. Sold in 1957 to Magallanes Compania Armadora and renamed Magallanes. Operated under the management of Mavroleon Bros. Sold in 1959 to Fairseas Freighters Corp. and renamed Alexander S. M. Reflagged to Liberia and operated under the management of World Seas Shipping Co. Renamed Thimar S. in 1966. She ran aground near Soehi Besar, Malaysia (2°58′N 108°40′E) on 23 June 1967 whilst on a voyage from Mormugao, India to a Japanese port. She was abandoned as a total loss.

== O. B. Martin ==
O. B. Martin was built by Todd Houston Shipbuilding Corporation, Houston, Texas. Her keel was laid on 20 March 1944. She was launched on 28 April and delivered on 11 May. Laid up in Suisun Bay post-war, she arrived at Kaohsiung, Taiwan for scrapping in April 1973.

== O. Henry ==
O. Henry was built by Permanente Metals Corporation, Richmond, California. Her keel was laid on 8 June 1942. She was launched on 8 August and delivered on 12 September. She was scrapped at Mobile, Alabama in January 1962.

== O. L. Bodenhamer ==
O. L. Bodenhamer was built by Delta Shipbuilding Company, New Orleans, Louisiana. Her keel was laid on 20 June 1944. She was launched on 2 August and delivered on 31 August. Laid up at Mobile post-war, she was scuttled off Miami, Florida on 14 May 1976.

== Ole E. Rolvaag ==
Ole E. Rolvaag was built by Permanente Metals Corporation. Her keel was laid on 22 May 1943. She was launched on 13 June and delivered on 25 June. Laid up in the James River post-war, she was scrapped at Bilbao, Spain in July 1971.

== Oliver Ellsworth ==
Oliver Ellsworth was built by Bethlehem Fairfield Shipyard. Her keel was laid on 31 March 1942. She was launched on 4 June and delivered on 22 June. Built for the WSA, she was operated under the management of Agwilines Inc. She was torpedoed and damaged in the Greenland Sea 100 nautical miles (190 km) south of Spitsbergen, Norway (75°52′N 7°55′E) by U-408 on 13 September 1942 whilst on a voyage from New York to Arkhangelsk, Soviet Union. She was sunk by a Royal Navy warship.

== Oliver Evans ==
Oliver Evans was built by Permanente Metals Corporation. Her keel was laid on 4 April 1943. She was launched on 2 May and delivered on 14 May. She was scrapped at Portland, Maine in December 1959.

== Oliver Hazard Perry ==
Oliver Hazard Perry was built by California Shipbuilding Corporation, Terminal Island, Los Angeles, California. Her keel was laid on 15 September 1941. She was launched on 18 February 1942 and delivered on 9 May. Laid up at Beaumont, Texas post-war, she was scrapped at Brownsville, Texas in March 1971.

== Oliver Kelley ==
Oliver Kelley was built by Permanete Metals Corporation. Her keel was laid on 14 December 1943. She was launched on 4 January 1944 and delivered on 14 January. She was scrapped at Seattle, Washington in August 1959.

== Oliver Loving ==
Oliver Loving was built by Todd Houston Shipbuilding Corporation. Her keel was laid on 4 May 1944. She was launched on 6 June and delivered on 17 June. She was scrapped at New Orleans in June 1970.

== Oliver Wendell Holmes ==
Oliver Wendell Holmes was built by Oregon Shipbuilding Corporation, Portland, Oregon. Her keel was laid on 26 March 1942. She was launched on 7 May and delivered on 25 May. She was scrapped at New Orleans in February 1970.

== Oliver Westover ==
Oliver Westover was built by New England Shipbuilding Corporation, South Portland, Maine. Her keel was laid on 15 March 1945. She was launched on 3 May and delivered on 16 May. To the French Government under Lend-Lease in 1946 and renamed Sète. Operated under the management of Compagnie de Navigation Paquet. Management transferred to Compagnie de Navigation Fraissinet in 1948, which became Compagnie de Navigation Fraissinet et Cyprien Fabre in 1955. Management transferred to Compagnie Fabre Société Générale de Transports Maritimes in 1964. Sold in 1968 to Société Maritime de Gerance et d'Armement and renamed Allison. Reflagged to Monaco and operated under the management of P. G. Troianos. She was scrapped at Hirao, Japan in June 1968.

== Oliver Wolcott ==
Oliver Wolcott was built by Permanente Metals Corporation. Her keel was laid on 22 May 1942. She was launched on 7 August and delivered on 26 August. She was scrapped at Oakland, California in July 1961.

== Omar E. Chapman ==
Omar E. Chapman was built by New England Shipbuilding Corporation. Her keel was laid on 1 September 1943. She was launched on 21 October and delivered on 31 October. Laid up in the James River post-war, she was scrapped at Castellón de la Plana, Spain in June 1972.

== Opie Read ==
Opie Read was a tanker built by Delta Shipbuilding Company. Her keel was laid on 19 October 1943. She was launched on 3 December and delivered on 31 December. To the United States Navy in January 1944 and renamed Panda. Returned to WSA in July 1946 and renamed Opie Read. Sold in 1948 to Westport Steamship Co., New York and renamed Eastport. She was converted to a cargo ship at Hoboken, New Jersey in 1949. Now 7,257 GRT. Sold in 1954 to Compania Navigation Pardalina and renamed Pardalina. Reflagged to Liberia and operated under the management of Blidberg Rothchild Agency. Sold in 1963 to Caroline Navigation Inc. and renamed San Antonio. Operated under the management of Ceres Shipping Co. She was scrapped at Hirao in February 1968.

== Ora Ellis ==
Ora Ellis was a boxed aircraft transport built by J. A. Jones Construction Company, Panama City, Florida. Her keel was laid on 23 July 1945. She was launched on 26 September and delivered on 16 October. Built for the WSA, she was operated under the management of Polarus Steamship Co. Sold in 1947 to Coral Steamship Corp., New York and renamed Coral Sea. Renamed Seacoral in 1951 and placed under the management of Orion Shipping & Trading Co. Sold in 1954 to Coral Compania Armadora, Panama and reflagged to Liberia, remaining under the same management. Lengthened at Kobe, Japan in 1955. Now 511 feet 6 inches (155.91 m) long and 8,577 GRT. Renamed Andros Coral in 1957. She ran aground south east of Dona Sebastiana Island, Chile on 18 May 1960 whilst on a voyage from San Juan de la Costa, Chile to Buenos Aires, Argentina. She sank on 20 May and was abandoned as a constructive total loss.

== Oran M. Roberts ==
Oran M. Roberts was built by Todd Houston Shipbuilding Corporation. Her keel was laid on 4 June 1943. She was launched on 15 July and delivered on 5 August. Laid up at Mobile post-war, she was scuttled off the coast of Alabama in 1974.

== Orel ==
Orel was built by Permanente Metals Corporation. Her keel was laid on 31 March 1943. She was launched as Charles E. Duryea on 27 April and delivered as Orel on 10 May. To the Soviet Union. Renamed Ivan Polzunov in 1947. Reported scrapped in the Soviet Union in 1973; deleted from Lloyd's Register in 1977.

== Orland Loomis ==
Orland Loomis was built by California Shipbuilding Corporation. Her keel was laid on 21 October 1943. She was launched on 16 November and delivered on 7 December. Laid up in the James River post-war, she was scrapped at Philadelphia, Pennsylvania in July 1973.

== Orson D. Munn ==
Orson D. Munn was a tanker built by California Shipbuilding Corporation. She was completed in October 1943. Built for the WSA, she was operated under the management of Union Oil Company of California. Sold in 1948 to Phoenix Steamship Corp. and renamed Halcyon III. Operated under the management of Orion Shipping & Trading Co. Converted to a cargo ship at Baltimore in 1949. Now 7,156 GRT. Sold in 1952 to Coruna Compania Navigation and renamed Gavrion. Reflagged to Panama, remaining under the same management. Renamed Lilla in 1957. Sold in 1960 to Syra Compania Maritima and renamed Syra. Reflagged to Greece and operated under the management of Trans-Ocean Steamship Agency. Lengthened at Maizuru, Japan in 1964. Now 511 feet 6 inches (155.91 m) long and 8,364 GRT. She ran aground at Punta del Frei, 4 nautical miles (7.4 km) south of Algeciras, Spain on 16 June 1967 whilst on a voyage from Gela, Sicily, Italy to Puerto Cabello, Spain. She was refloated and towed in to Algeciras, then to Cartagena, Spain. Declared a constructive total loss, she was towed to Genoa, Italy and subsequently sold for scrapping.

== Orville P. Taylor ==
Orville P. Taylor was built by Bethlehem Fairfield Shipyard. Her keel was laid on 9 August 1943. She was launched as Orville P. Taylor on 3 September and delivered as Samothrace on 11 September. To the Ministry of War Transport (MoWT) under Lend-Lease. Operated under the management of Pacific Steam Navigation Company, Liverpool. Sold to her managers in 1947 and renamed Talca. Sold in 1953 to Compania Navigation Aris, Panama and renamed Popi. Reflagged to Costa Rica and operated under the management of C. & E. Pateras. Reflagged to Greece in 1959. Sold in 1961 to Atlas Maritime Finance Corp., Panama and renamed Lydia. Reflagged to Lebanon and operated under the management of Lyras Bros. She was scrapped at Whampoa Dock, Hong Kong in July 1967.

== Oscar Chappell ==
Oscar Chappell was built by Todd Houston Shipbuilding Corporation. Her keel was laid on 29 September 1943. She was launched on 10 November and delivered on 20 November. She was scrapped at Baltimore in March 1958.

== Oscar F. Barrett ==
Oscar F. Barrett was a tanker built by California Shipbuilding Corporation. She was completed in October 1943. Built for the WSA, she was operated under the management of American Republics Corporation. Sold in 1948 to Paco Tankers Inc. and renamed Paco. Operated under the management of Keystone Shipping Co. Sold in 1954 to Theatre Navigation Corp. and renamed Gayety. Reflagged to Liberia and operated under the management of Rector Shipping Co as a molasses tanker. Sold in 1955 to San Rafael Compania Navigation. Operated under the management of Orion Shipping & Trading Co. Converted to a cargo ship at Greenock, United Kingdom later that year. Lengthened at Sasebo, Japan in 1956 and renamed Appolonius. Now 511 feet 6 inches (155.91 m) long and 8,540 GRT. Renamed Andros Champion in 1957. Sold in 1960 to Overseas Carrier Corp. and renamed Pagastikos. Reflagged to Greece, remaining under the same management. Sold in 1962 to Portorafti Compania Maritime, Panama and renamed Portorafti. Operated under the management of Trans Ocean Steamship Agency. Sold in 1964 to Argus Navigation Corp., Lugano, Switzerland and renamed Navia. Reflagged to Liberia. She was scrapped at Split, Yugoslavia in March 1971.

== Oscar S. Straus ==
Oscar S. Straus was a tanker built by Delta Shipbuilding Company. Her keel was laid on 16 August 1943. She was launched on 4 October and delivered on 22 November. Built for the WSA, she was operated under the management of Spencer Kellogg & Sons, Inc. Management transferred to Keystone Shipping Corp. in 1946. Sold in 1948 to Charles Kurz & Co, remaining under the same management. Converted to a molasses tanker in 1949. Sold in 1955 to San Rafael Compania Navigation, Panama and renamed Americus. Reflagged to Liberia and operated under the management of Orion Shipping & Trading Co. Lengthened that year at Kure, now 511 feet 6 inches (155.91 m) long and 8,509 GRT. Renamed Andros Navigator in 1957. Sold in 1960 to Islanders Shipping Corp. and renamed Ladon. Reflagged to Greece, remaining under the same management. Sold in 1962 to Argre Compania Navigation, Panama and renamed Arietta. Remaining under the Greek flag and operated under the management of Trans-Ocean Steamship Agency. Sold in 1967 to Pacific Coast Shipping Co. and rename Popeye. Reflagged to Liberia and operated under the management of Lasco Shipping Co. She was scrapped at Pusan, South Korea in May 1970.

== Oscar Underwood ==
Oscar Underwood was built by California Shipbuilding Corporation. Her keel was laid on 14 January 1944. She was launched on 8 February and delivered on 26 February. Built for the WSA, she was operated under the management of Seas Shipping Co. Sold in 1947 to Hellenic Lines Ltd, Piraeus, Greece & New York and renamed Hellenic Beach. Reflagged to Greece. Placed under the management of P. G. Callimanopulos in 1953. She was scrapped in Turkey in October 1972.

== Otis E. Hall ==
Otis E. Hall was built by Todd Houston Shipbuilding Corporation. Her keel was laid on 7 October 1944. She was launched on 13 November and delivered on 21 November. She was scrapped at Oakland in January 1968.

== Otis Skinner ==
Otis Skinner was built by Permanente Metals Corporation. Her keel was laid on 29 November 1943. She was launched on 19 December and delivered on 31 December. Built for the WSA, she was operated under the management of American-Hawaiian Steamship Company. Damaged by Japanese aircraft in March 1945, she was repaired at Richmond. Transferred to the United States Maritime Commission (USMC) in 1946. Sold in July 1947 to D/S A/S Anglo, Haugesund, Norway and renamed Valhall. Operated under the management of Valdemar Skogland A/S. She ran aground in Vatlestraumen on 16 November 1958. Laid up at Bøvågen on 25 January 1959. Sold in February 1965 to Groborg Shipping Co., Monrovia, Liberia and renamed Simone. Operated under the management of Galbraith, Pembroke & Co. Ltd. She arrived at Castellón de la Plana for scrapping on 30 March 1967, and was scrapped there the next month.

== Otto Mears ==
Otto Mears was built by Permanente Metals Corporation. Her keel was laid on 8 September 1943. She was launched on 26 September and delivered on 7 October. Built for the WSA, she was operated under the management of Matson Navigation Co. to the United States War Department in 1946. Sold in 1947 to Tirrenia Società Anonyme di Navigazione, Naples, Italy and renamed Napoli. Renamed Posillipo in 1948. Sold in 1952 to Giacomo Costa fu Andrea, Genoa. Renamed Federico Costa in 1954, then Bianca C. in 1956 and Bice Costa in 1957. Sold in 1960 to Enosis Maritime S.A. and renamed Enosis. Reflagged to Lebanon and operated under the management of A. Angelicoussis & D. Efthimiou. She caught fire in the Krabi River, Thailand (7°52′N 98°56′E) on 22 November 1967 and was beached. She was on a voyage from Chingwangtao, China to an Indian port. She floated off on 4 December, still afire. Taken in tow on 11 December and beached at Penang, Malaysia where the fire was extinguished. She was refloated on 21 January 1968 and towed to Singapore. Declared a constructive total loss, she was scrapped at Jurong, Singapore.

== Ovid Butler ==
Ovid Butler was built by Permanente Metals Corporation. Her keel was laid on 20 May 1944. She was launched on 7 June and delivered on 15 June. She was scrapped at New Orleans in August 1965.

== Owen Summers ==
Owen Summers was built by Oregon Shipbuilding Corporation. Her keel was laid on 13 January 1943. She was launched on 11 February and delivered on 19 February. She was scrapped at Baltimore in August 1961.

== Owen Wister ==
Owen Wister was built by St. Johns River Shipbuilding Company, Jacksonville, Florida. Her keel was laid on 2 November 1943. She was launched on 14 December and delivered on 24 December. She was scrapped at Portland, Oregon in December 1964.
