= List of Liberty ships (U–V) =

This is a list of Liberty ships with names beginning with U and V.

== Description ==
The standard Liberty ship (EC-2-S-C1 type) was a cargo ship 441 feet 6 inches (134.57 m) long overall, with a beam of 56 feet 10 3/4 inches (17.34 m). It had a depth of 37 feet 4 inches (11.38 m) and a draft of 26 feet 10 inches (8.18 m). It was powered by a triple expansion steam engine, which had cylinders of 24 1/2 inches (62 cm), 37 inches (94 cm) and 70 inches (180 cm) diameter by 48 inches (120 cm) stroke. The engine produced 2,500ihp at 76rpm. Driving a four-blade propeller 18 feet 6 inches (5.64 m) in diameter, could propel the ship at 11 knots (20 km/h).

Cargo was carried in five holds, numbered 1–5 from bow to stern. Grain capacity was 84,183 cubic feet (2,383.8 m^{3}), 145,604 cubic feet (4,123.0 m^{3}), 96,429 cubic feet (2,730.6 m^{3}), 93,190 cubic feet (2,639 m^{3}) and 93,190 cubic feet (2,639 m^{3}), with a further 49,086 cubic feet (1,390.0 m^{3}) in the deep tanks. Bale capacity was 75,405 cubic feet (2,135.2 m^{3}), 134,638 cubic feet (3,812.5 m^{3}), 83,697 cubic feet (2,370.0 m^{3}), 82,263 cubic feet (2,329.4 m^{3}) and 82,435 cubic feet (2,334.3 m^{3}), with a further 41,135 cubic feet (1,164.8 m^{3}) in the deep tanks.

It carried a crew of 45, plus 36 United States Navy Armed Guard gunners. Later in the war, this was altered to a crew of 52, plus 29 gunners. Accommodation was in a three deck superstructure placed midships. The galley was equipped with a range, a 25 US gallons (95 L) stock kettle and other appliances. Messrooms were equipped with an electric hot plate and an electric toaster.

== U ==
=== Uriah M. Rose ===
Uriah M. Rose was built by Permanente Metals Corporation, Richmond, California. Her keel was laid on 19 December 1943. She was launched on 10 January 1944 and delivered on 18 January. Built for the War Shipping Administration (WSA), she was operated under the management of American President Lines, San Francisco, California. Sold to the French Government in 1947 and renamed Auray. Operated under the management of Compagnie Générale Transatlantique. Management transferred to Compagnie des Messageries Maritimes in 1950. Sold in 1961 to Zim Israel Navigation Co., Haifa, Israel and renamed Pan. New diesel engine fitted that year by Ateliers et Chantiers de Bretagne, Nantes, France. Sold in 1964 to Pagan Steamship Corp., Nassau, Bahamas and renamed Orchidea. Reflagged to the United Kingdom. Sold in 1970 to Ardena Shipping Co. and renamed Andena. Reflagged to Cyprus and operated under the management of Pateras Bros. She was scrapped at Bilbao, Spain in June 1972.

=== U.S.O ===
U.S.O. was built by Bethlehem Fairfield Shipyard, Baltimore, Maryland. Her keel was laid on 29 September 1943. She was launched on 21 October and delivered on 30 October. Built for the WSA, she was operated under the management of Blidberg Rothchild & Co., New York. Sold to her managers in 1947. Sold in 1954 to Compania Maritima Columbella, Panama and renamed Columbella. Reflagged to Liberia and operated under the management of her previous owners. Sold in 1962 to Compania Naviera Mercatoria, Panama and renamed Ekali. Reflagged to Greece and operated under the joint management of Naftilos Shipping & Commercial Enterprises and Tropis Shipping Co. Sold in 1965 to Peggy Navigation Co., Panama and renamed Loyal Fortunes. Operated under the management of China Marine Investment Co. Sold in 1966 to Loyal Navigation Co., Panama. Remaining under the same flag and management. She was driven onto the Pratas Reef, 165 nautical miles (306 km) south east of Hong Kong (20°43′N 116°43′E) in a typhoon on 6 November 1967 and was severely damaged. She was declared a compromised total loss. The wreck was sold for scrapping in situ.

== V ==
=== Vachel Lindsay ===
Vachel Lindsay was built by Permanente Metals Corporation, Richmond, California. Her keel was laid on 12 August 1943. She was launched on 6 September and delivered on 15 September. Laid up at Beaumont, Texas post-war, she was scrapped at Brownsville, Texas in September 1972.

=== Vadso ===
Vadso was built by J. A. Jones Construction Company, Brunswick, Georgia. Her keel was laid on 21 November 1944. She was launched as Robert J. Banks 20 December and delivered as Vadso on 30 December. To Norway under Lend-Lease. Operated under the management of Nortraship. Sold in 1946 to Skips A/S Mandeville, Oslo and renamed Libreville. Operated under the management of A. F. Klaveness & Co. A/S. Sold in 1952 to Rio Valioso Compania Navigation, Panama and renamed Afros. Operated under the management of John & George Dambassis - Seacrest Shipping Co. Sold in 1962 to Marlea Compania Navigation, Beirut, Lebanon and renamed Theodores Lemos. Operated under the management of M. C. Fred Hunter. She arrived at Shanghai, China for scrapping on 7 June 1967, and was scrapped that month.

=== Valery Chkalov ===
Valery Chkalov was built by Oregon Shipbuilding Corporation, Portland, Oregon. Her keel was laid on 1 December 1943. She was launched as Grant P. Marsh on 16 December and delivered as Valery Chkalov on 30 December. To the Soviet Union under Lend-Lease. Deleted from shipping registers c.1964.

=== Van Lear Black ===
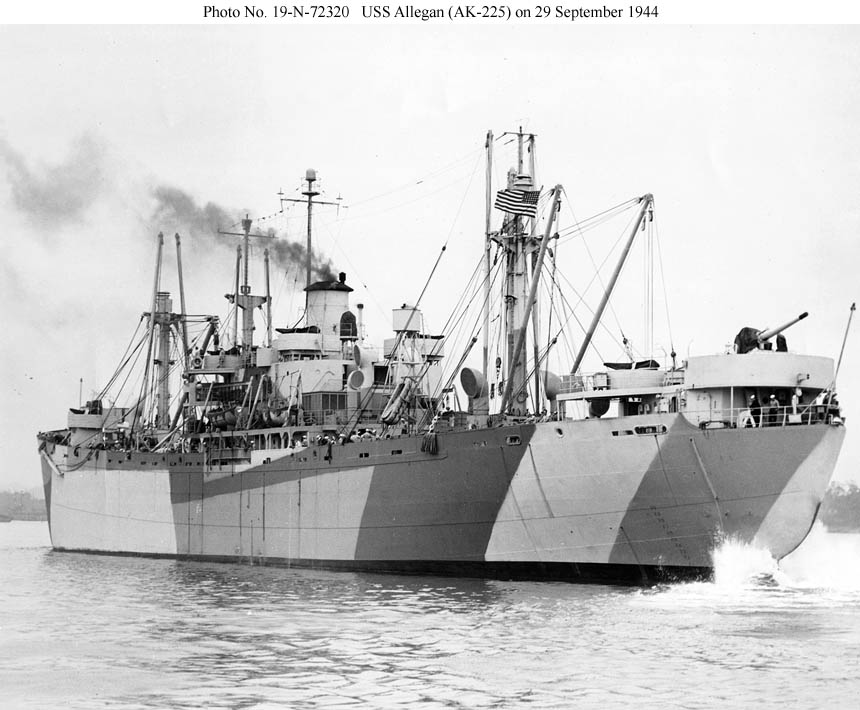
USS Allegan

Van Lear Black was built by Bethlehem Fairfield Shipyard, Baltimore, Maryland. Her keel was laid on 21 December 1943. She was launched on 21 January 1944 and delivered on 31 January. To the United States Navy in August 1944 and renamed Allegan. Returned to the War Shipping Administration (WSA) in November 1945 and renamed Van Lear Black. Laid up in reserve. Sold in 1947 to Compania de Navigation San Leonardo, Panama and renamed San Leonardo. Placed under the management of Mar-Trade Corp. in 1949. Sold in 1951 to Society Navigation Interamericana and renamed Wanderer. Operated under the management of Western Shipping Corp. Sold in 1955 to La Guayra Compania Navigation. Operated under the management of Embiricos Ltd. Reflagged to Liberia in 1956. Sold in 1959 to Force Steamship Corp. and renamed Valiant Force. Reflagged to the United States and operated under the management of Ocean Carriers Corp. Sold in 1963 to Potomac Steamship Corp., New York and renamed Wanderer. Reflagged to Liberia. Renamed Wanderlust later that year. Sold in 1964 to Macedonian Steamship Corp. and renamed Agathopolis. Operated under the management of Dynamic Shipping Inc. She was scrapped at Onomichi, Japan in October 1969.

=== Vernon L. Kellogg ===
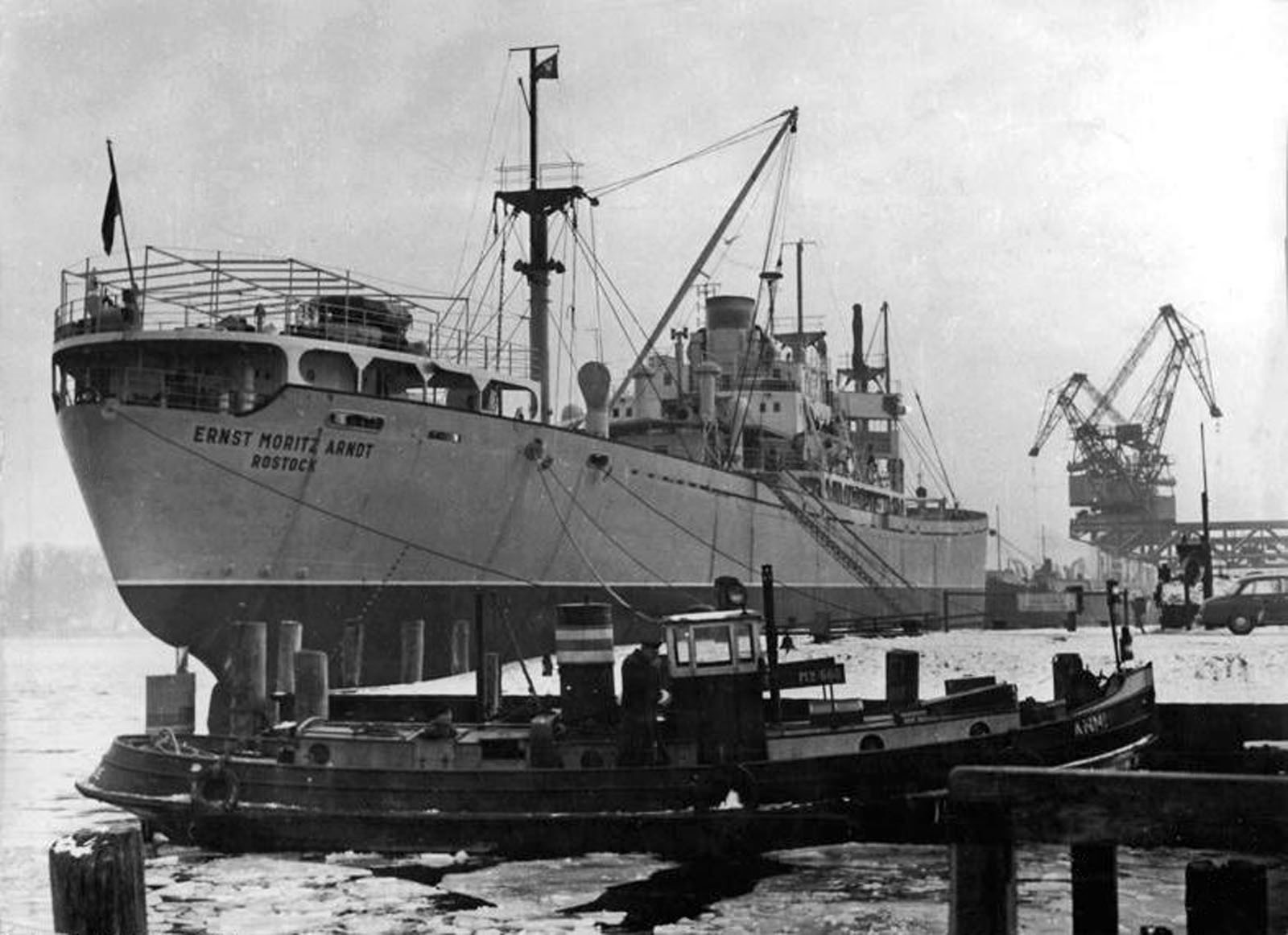
Ernst Moritz Arndt

Vernon L. Kellogg was built by California Shipbuilding Corporation, Terminal Island, Los Angeles, California. Her keel was laid on 20 June 1943. She was launched on 15 July and delivered on 28 July. Built for the WSA, she was operated under the management of Grace Line Inc. Sold in 1947 to A/S Awilco, Oslo and renamed Wilfred. Operated under the management of Anders Wilhelmsen. Sold in 1949 to Skips A/S Garm, Risør, Norway and renamed Folke Bernadotte. Operated under the management of Prebensen & Blaksted. Sold in 1954 to San Gabriel Compania Maritima S.A., Panama and renamed Archon Gabriel. Reflagged to Costa Rica and operated under the management of Diamantis Lemos. She ran aground 2 nautical miles (3.7 km) east of the Griefswald Lighthouse, East Germany on 8 January 1958 whilst on a voyage from Rio de Janeiro, Brazil to Szczecin, Poland. Refloated on 17 January but grounded again. Refloated on 22 January and completed her journey. As the salvage bills were not paid, she was take over by the East German authorities. Repaired at Stettiner Werft, and then put into service with Deutsche Seereederi, Rostock as Ernst Moritz Arndt. Sold in 1968 to Spiritath Compania Navigation, Panama and renamed Kypros. Reflagged to Cyprus and operated under the management of Troodos Shipping & Trading Co. She was scrapped at Kaohsiung, Taiwan in October 1971.

=== Vernon L. Parrington ===
Vernon L. Parrington was built by Permanente Metals Corporation. Her keel was laid on 2 October 1943. She was launched on 21 October and delivered on 29 October. Built for the WSA, she was operated under the management of American South African Line. To the Dutch Government in 1947 and renamed Filips van Marnix. Sold later that year to Phs. van Ommerens Scheepsvaarts Bedrijf N.V., Rotterdam and renamed Loosdrecht. Sold in 1950 to N.V. Stoomvaarts Maatschappij De Maas. Operated under the management of her former owners. Sold in 1961 to Crescent Shipping Co., Panama and renamed Crescent. Operated under the management of Patt Manfield & Co. she was driven ashore in a typhoon at Hong Kong on 1 September 1962. Declared a total loss, she was scrapped in situ.

=== Vernon S. Hood ===
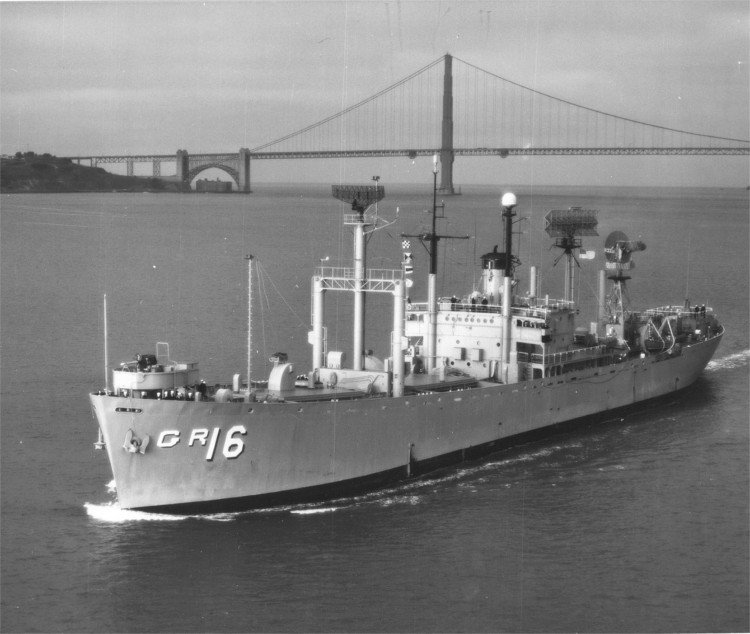
USS Watchman

Vernon S. Hood was a boxed aircraft transport built by J. A. Jones Construction Co, Panama City, Florida. Her keel was laid on 17 January 1945. She was launched on 20 February and delivered on 7 March. She was laid up in the James River in 1947. To the United States Navy in September 1957 and renamed Watchman. Converted for naval use at Charleston Naval Shipyard, Charleston, South Carolina. Laid up in Suisun Bay in September 1965. She was sold for scrapping at Portland, Oregon in October 1974.

=== Victor C. Vaughan ===
Victor C. Vaughan was built by Oregon Shipbuilding Corporation. Her keel was laid on 27 August 1943. She was launched as Victor C. Vaughan on 12 September and delivered as Samzona on 19 September. To the Ministry of War Transport (MoWT) under Lend-Lease. Operated under the management of Royal Mail Lines. Returned to the United States Maritime Commission (USMC) in 1948 and renamed Victor C. Vaughan. Laid up at Mobile, Alabama. She was scrapped at Orange, Texas in 1961.

=== Victor F. Lawson ===
Victor F. Lawson was built by California Shipbuilding Corporation. Her keel was laid on 24 July 1943. She was launched as Victor F. Lawson on 17 August and delivered as Sampep on 31 August. To the MoWT under Lend-Lease. Operated under the management of Houlder Bros. & Co. Returned to USMC in 1948. Officially renamed Victor F. Lawson, but laid up at Astoria, Oregon as Sampep. She was scrapped at Portland, Oregon in April 1969.

=== Victor Herbert ===
Victor Herbert was built by J. A. Jones Construction Co, Panama City. Her keel was laid on 30 June 1943. She was launched on 22 August and delivered on 15 September. Built for the WSA, she was operated under the management of Marine Transport Lines. To the French Government in 1946. Operated under the management of Compagnie Delmas Vieljeux. Renamed Le Verdon in 1947. Management transferred to Compagnie de Transports Oceaniques in 1948, then to Compagnie des Messageries Maritimes in 1953. She was scrapped at Bremerhaven, West Germany in November 1963.

=== Viggo Hansteen ===
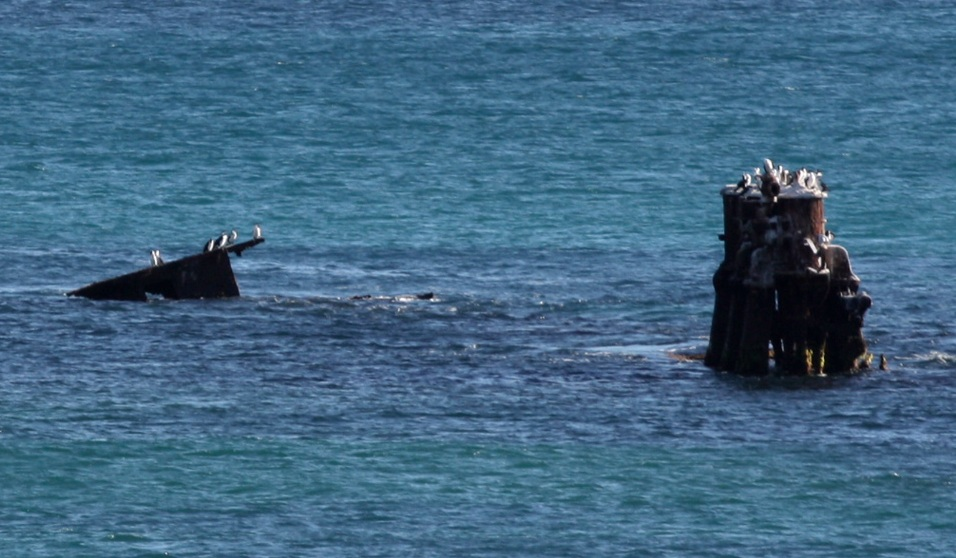
The wreck of Alkimos, September 2012.

Viggo Hansteen was built by Bethlehem Fairfield Shipyard. Her keel was laid on 18 September 1943. She was launched as George M. Shriver on 11 October and delivered as Viggo Hansteen on 18 October. To Norway under Lend-Lease. Sold in January 1947 to S. Ugelstad Rederi, Oslo. Operated under the management of S. Ugelstad. Sold in 1948 to A/S Asplund, Moss, Norway. Operated under the management of Rønneburg & Galtung. Sold in 1953 to Alkimos Shipping Co. S.A., Puerto Limon and renamed Alkimos. Operated under the management of Faros Shipping Co. Reflagged to Greece in 1959. She ran aground 170 nautical miles (310 km) north of Fremantle, Australia on 20 March 1963 and was severely damaged. She was refloated on 25 March and towed in to Fremantle. Departed for Hong Kong under tow on 30 May. The towline broke the next day and she ran aground (at 31°38′S 115°41′E). She was refloated on 11 February 1964. She was driven ashore on 2 May but was refloated. She was driven ashore again on 1 July and declared a constructive total loss. Subsequently, sold to Fremantle shipbreakers and partly scrapped. Wreck still in situ as of September 2012.

=== Vincent Harrington ===
Vincent Harrington was built by Bethlehem Fairfield Shipyard. Her keel was laid on 16 June 1944. She was launched on 22 July and delivered on 31 July. Built for the WSA, she was operated under the management of Dichmann, Wright & Pugh. Renamed Calmar in 1947. Sold in 1955 to Bethlehem Steel Corp. Operated under the management of Calmar Steamship Corp. To USMC in 1962 and laid up at San Francisco. She was scrapped at Richmond in 1963.

=== Virginia Dare ===
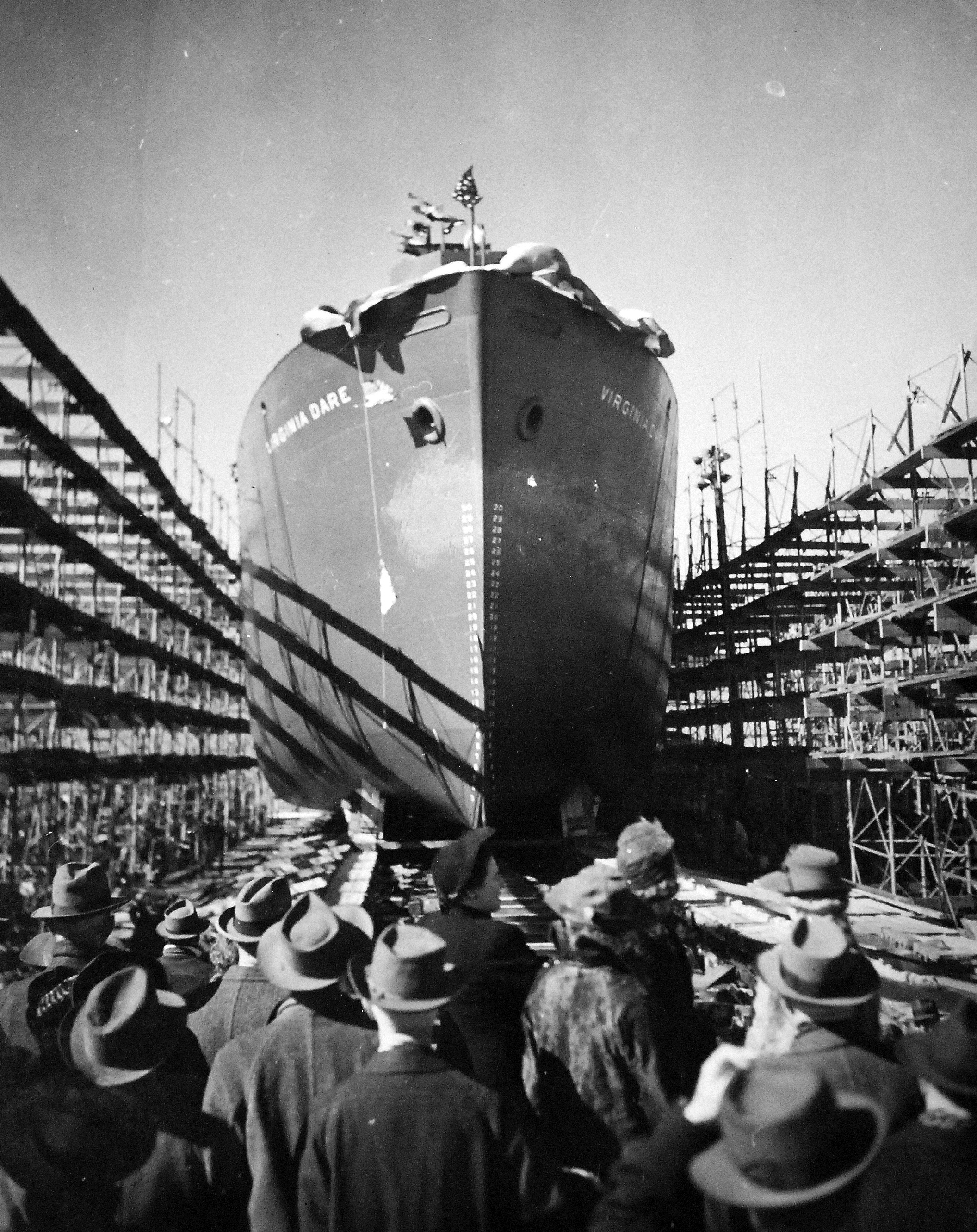
Launch of Virginia Dare.

Virginia Dare was built by North Carolina Shipbuilding Company, Wilmington, North Carolina. Her keel was laid on 28 May 1941. She was launched on 3 February 1942 and delivered on 27 March. Built for the WSA, she was operated under the management of South Atlantic Steamship Co. She struck a mine and was damaged off Bizerta, Tunisia on 6 March 1944 whilst on a voyage from New York to Suez, Egypt. She was towed in to Tunis. On her next voyage, she started to break up and was beached in Tunis Bay on 13 March. She broke in two and was a total loss. The wreck was scrapped at Barcelona, Spain in October 1948.

=== Vitus Bering ===
Vitus Bering was built by Permanente Metals Corporation. Her keel was laid on 14 January 1943. She was launched on 17 February and delivered on 28 February. She was scrapped at Baltimore in October 1961.

=== Vladivostock ===
Vladivostock was built by Oregon Shipbuilding Corporation. Her keel was laid on 10 May 1943. She was launched as Pleasant Armstrong on 30 May and delivered as Vladivostock on 7 June. To the Soviet Union under Lend-Lease. Renamed Uelen in 1962. She was delivered to a shipyard in Vladivostok for scrapping in February 1976.

=== Voikov ===
Voikov was built by California Shipbuilding Corporation. Her keel was laid on 28 December 1942. She was launched on as Samuel P. Langley 24 January 1943 and delivered as Voikov on 9 February. To the Soviet Union under Lend-Lease. Converted to a non-propelled workshop in 1974. She was deleted from Lloyd's Register in 1977.
