= List of Liberty ships (Z) =

This is a list of Liberty ships with names beginning with Z.

== Description ==
The standard Liberty ship (EC-2-S-C1 type) was a cargo ship 441 feet 6 inches (134.57 m) long overall, with a beam of 56 feet 10 3/4 inches (17.34 m). It had a depth of 37 feet 4 inches (11.38 m) and a draft of 26 feet 10 inches (8.18 m). It was powered by a triple expansion steam engine, which had cylinders of 24 1/2 inches (62 cm), 37 inches (94 cm) and 70 inches (180 cm) diameter by 48 inches (120 cm) stroke. The engine produced 2,500ihp at 76rpm. Driving a four-blade propeller 18 feet 6 inches (5.64 m) in diameter, could propel the ship at 11 knots (20 km/h).

Cargo was carried in five holds, numbered 1–5 from bow to stern. Grain capacity was 84,183 cubic feet (2,383.8 m^{3}), 145,604 cubic feet (4,123.0 m^{3}), 96,429 cubic feet (2,730.6 m^{3}), 93,190 cubic feet (2,639 m^{3}) and 93,190 cubic feet (2,639 m^{3}), with a further 49,086 cubic feet (1,390.0 m^{3}) in the deep tanks. Bale capacity was 75,405 cubic feet (2,135.2 m^{3}), 134,638 cubic feet (3,812.5 m^{3}), 83,697 cubic feet (2,370.0 m^{3}), 82,263 cubic feet (2,329.4 m^{3}) and 82,435 cubic feet (2,334.3 m^{3}), with a further 41,135 cubic feet (1,164.8 m^{3}) in the deep tanks.

It carried a crew of 45, plus 36 United States Navy Armed Guard gunners. Later in the war, this was altered to a crew of 52, plus 29 gunners. Accommodation was in a three deck superstructure placed midships. The galley was equipped with a range, a 25 US gallons (95 L) stock kettle and other appliances. Messrooms were equipped with an electric hot plate and an electric toaster.

== Zachary Taylor ==
Zachary Taylor was built by Permanente Metals Corporation, Richmond, California. Her keel was laid on 6 October 1941. She was launched on 28 February 1942 and delivered on 18 April. She was scrapped at Staten Island, New York in October 1961.

== Zane Grey ==
Zane Grey was built by California Shipbuilding Corporation, Terminal Island, Los Angeles, California. Her keel was laid on 12 December 1942. She was launched on 9 January 1943 and delivered on 25 January. Laid up in the James River post-war, she was scuttled 4 nautical miles (7.4 km) south of the Oregon Inlet, North Carolina on 12 December 1974.

== Zebulon B. Vance ==
Zebulon B. Vance was built by North Carolina Shipbuilding Company, Wilmington, North Carolina. Her keel was laid on 22 May 1941. She was launched on 6 December and delivered on 17 February 1942. Assigned the name Zinnia for use as a hospital ship in 1943, but the name was not used. She was converted to a 7,933 GRT hospital ship at Boston, Massachusetts in November 1943. To the United States Army and renamed John J. Meany. Converted to a passenger ship at New York in January 1946 and renamed Zebulon B. Vance. Subsequently, laid up in the James River, she was scrapped at La Spezia, Italy in July 1970.

== Zebulon Pike ==
Zebulon Pike was built by California Shipbuilding Corporation. Her keel was laid on 27 October 1941. She was launched on 24 February 1942 and delivered on 9 May. She was scrapped at Panama City, Florida in July 1961.

== Zona Gale ==
Zona Gale was built by California Shipbuilding Corporation. Her keel was laid on 17 June 1943. She was launched on 12 July and delivered on 25 July. She was scrapped at Kearny, New Jersey in 1964.
