= List of Liberty ships (K) =

This is a list of Liberty ships with names beginning with K.

== Description ==
The standard Liberty ship (EC-2-S-C1 type) was a cargo ship 441 feet 6 inches (134.57 m) long overall, with a beam of 56 feet 10 3/4 inches (17.34 m). It had a depth of 37 feet 4 inches (11.38 m) and a draft of 26 feet 10 inches (8.18 m). It was powered by a triple expansion steam engine, which had cylinders of 24 1/2 inches (62 cm), 37 inches (94 cm) and 70 inches (180 cm) diameter by 48 inches (120 cm) stroke. The engine produced 2,500ihp at 76rpm. Driving a four-blade propeller 18 feet 6 inches (5.64 m) in diameter, could propel the ship at 11 knots (20 km/h).

Cargo was carried in five holds, numbered 1–5 from bow to stern. Grain capacity was 84,183 cubic feet (2,383.8 m^{3}), 145,604 cubic feet (4,123.0 m^{3}), 96,429 cubic feet (2,730.6 m^{3}), 93,190 cubic feet (2,639 m^{3}) and 93,190 cubic feet (2,639 m^{3}), with a further 49,086 cubic feet (1,390.0 m^{3}) in the deep tanks. Bale capacity was 75,405 cubic feet (2,135.2 m^{3}), 134,638 cubic feet (3,812.5 m^{3}), 83,697 cubic feet (2,370.0 m^{3}), 82,263 cubic feet (2,329.4 m^{3}) and 82,435 cubic feet (2,334.3 m^{3}), with a further 41,135 cubic feet (1,164.8 m^{3}) in the deep tanks.

It carried a crew of 45, plus 36 United States Navy Armed Guard gunners. Later in the war, this was altered to a crew of 52, plus 29 gunners. Accommodation was in a three deck superstructure placed midships. The galley was equipped with a range, a 25 US gallons (95 L) stock kettle and other appliances. Messrooms were equipped with an electric hot plate and an electric toaster.

== Kamenets-Podolsk ==
Kamenets-Podolsk was built by Permanente Metals Corporation, Richmond, California. Her keel was laid on 23 March 1944. She was launched as Robert S. Abbott on 13 April and delivered as Kamenets Podolsk on 18 April. To the Soviet Union. Listed as non-seagoing in 1977 and deleted from shipping registers in 1985.

== Kate Douglas Wiggin ==
Kate Douglas Wiggin was built by Permanente Metals Corporation. Her keel was laid onon 6 October 1943. She was launched on 25 October and delivered on 31 October. She was scrapped at Oakland, California in January 1965.

== Katharine B. Sherwood ==
Katharine B. Sherwood was built by Delta Shipbuilding Company, New Orleans, Louisiana. Her keel was laid on 18 August 1944. She was launched on 26 September and delivered on 31 October. She was scrapped at Terminal Island, Los Angeles, California in April 1966.

== Katherine L. Bates ==
Katherine L. Bates was built by Todd Houston Shipbuilding Corporation, Houston, Texas. Her keel was laid on 18 December 1943. She was launched on 9 February 1944 and delivered on 21 February. Built for the War Shipping Administration (WSA), she was operated under the management of Moore-McCormack Lines. To the French Government in 1946 and renamed Coutances. Operated under the management of Compagnie Générale Transatlantique. Sold in 1954 to Garraway S.A., Panama and renamed Mariblanca. Reflagged to Liberia and operated under the management of Wigham, Richardson & Co. Sold in 1955 to Mariblanca Navegaceon S.A., Panama. Remaining under the Liberian flag and operated under the management of Chandris Ltd. Sold in 1964 to General Carriers S.A., Panama. Remaining under the Liberian flag and operated under the management of Chandris Inc. Reflagged to Greece in 1967. She was scrapped at Kaohsiung, Taiwan in April 1969.

== Keith Palmer ==
Keith Palmer was built by Todd Houston Shipbuilding Corporation. Her keel was laid on 10 January 1944. She was launched on 23 February and delivered on 9 March. She was scrapped at Kearny, New Jersey in August 1968.

== Keith Vawter ==
Keith Vawter was built by Permanente Metals Corporation. Her keel was laid on 17 October 1943. She was launched on 5 November and delivered on 13 November. Built for the WSA, she was operated under the management of Interocean Steamship Co. Sold in 1947 to P. G. Callimanopulos, Piraeus, Greece and renamed Hellenic Star. Operated under the management of Hellenic Lines Ltd. Sold in 1970 to Pleides Shipping Co. and renamed Aghios Nicolaos. Reflagged to Cyprus and operated under the management of Canopus Shipping. She was scrapped at Istanbul, Turkey in April 1972.

== Kemp P. Battle ==
Kemp P. Battle was built by North Carolina Shipbuilding Company, Wilmington, North Carolina. Her keel was laid on 23 April 1943. She was launched on 18 May and delivered on 24 May. Built for the WSA, she was operated under the management of Luckenbach Steamship Co., Inc. Sold in 1947 to Waterman Steamship Corp., Mobile, Alabama and renamed Governor Graves. Sold in 1948 to Aurora Steamship Co., New York. Sold in 1950 to United States Navigation Shipping Inc., Wilmington. Sold in 1952 to Gotham Navigation Corp. and renamed Seaherald. Operated under the management of Orion Shipping & Trading Co. Sold in 1954 to Gotham Compania Navigation, Panama and renamed Herald. Reflagged to Liberia, remaining under the same management. Management transferred to Admanthos Ship Operating Co. in 1956, then to Syros Shipping Co. in 1960. Renamed Korithi in 1961 and reflagged to Greece. Sold in 1965 to Marine Development & Supply, Panama and renamed Eastbound. Reflagged to Liberia and operated under the management of Marine Industry Corp. Sold in 1967 to International Marine Development Corp. Remaining under the Liberian flag and operated under the management of Intermarine Inc. She was scrapped at Kaohsiung in September 1968.

== Kenmore ==
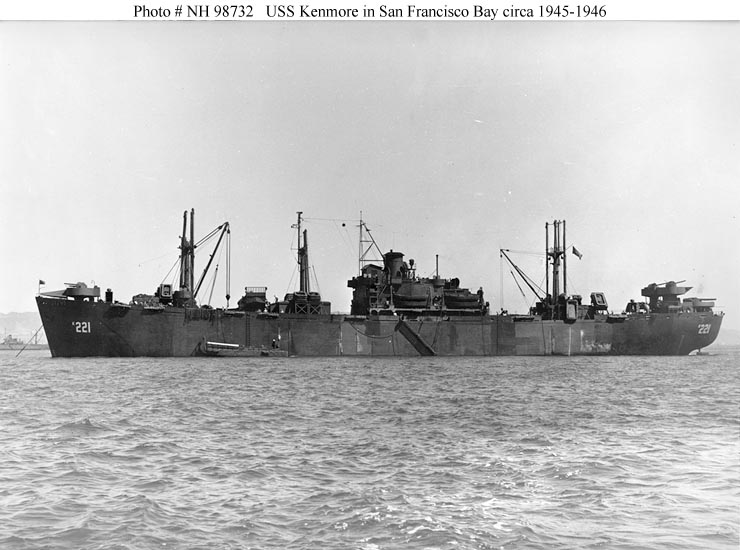
USS Kenmore

Kenmore was built by California Shipbuilding Corporation, Terminal Island. Her keel was laid on 8 May 1943. She was launched as James H. McClintock on 30 May and delivered to the United States Navy as Kenmore on 12 June. Returned to the WSA in January 1946 and renamed James H. McClintock. Laid up in Suisun Bay. She was sold in February 1973 for scrapping at Kaohsiung.

== Kenneth A. J. MacKenzie ==
Kenneth A. J. Mackenzie was built by Oregon Shipbuilding Corporation, Portland, Oregon. Her keel was laid on 18 February 1943. She was launched on 11 March and delivered on 21 March. She was scrapped at Panama City, Florida in May 1970.

== Kent Island ==
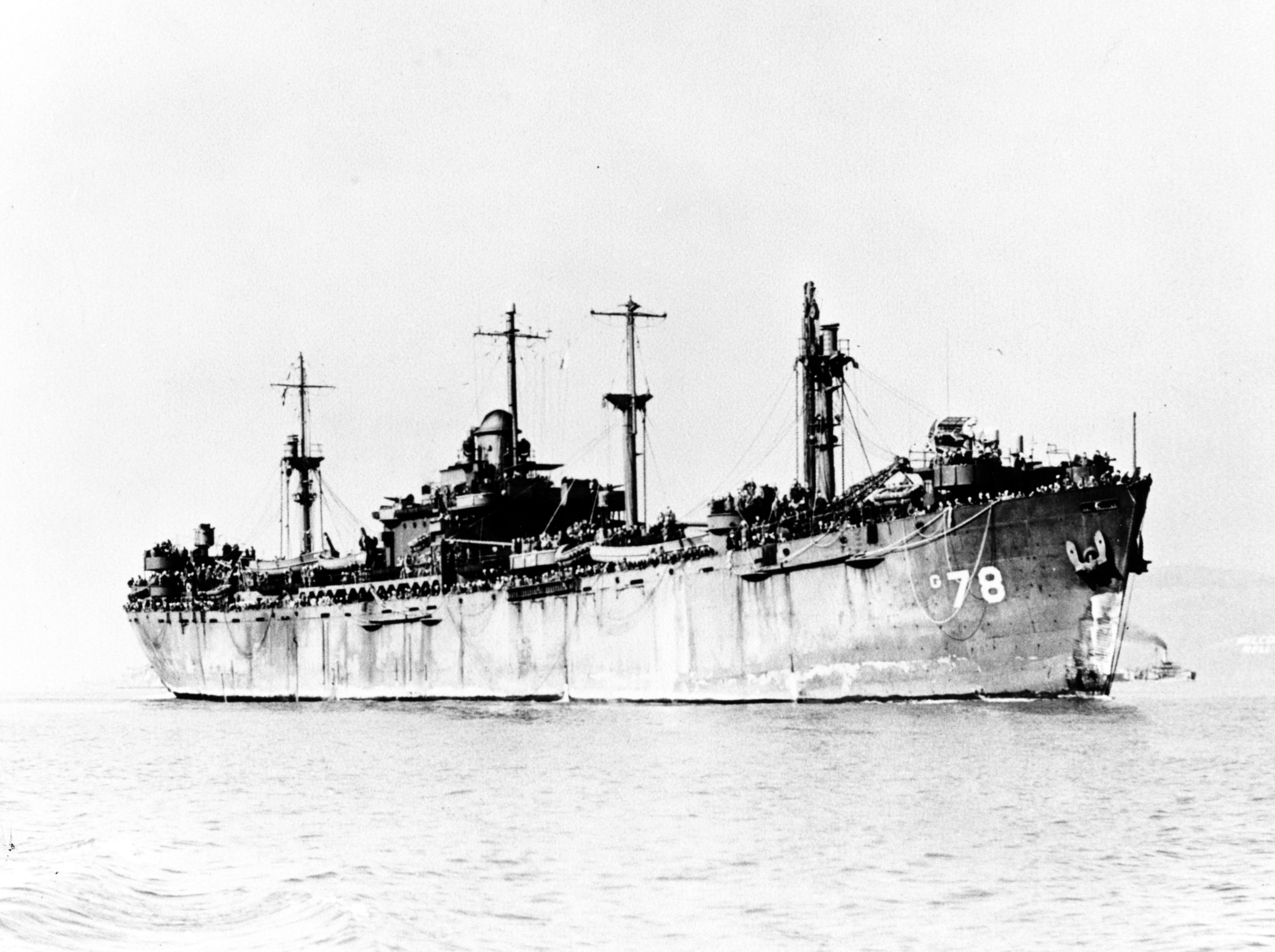
USS Kent Island

Kent Island was built by New England Shipbuilding Corporation, Portland, Maine. Her keel was laid on 19 November 1944. She was launched on 9 January 1945 and delivered on 19 January. To the United States Navy. Converted for naval use by Todd Shipbuilding Co., Hoboken, New Jersey. Laid up in reserve at Orange, Texas in June 1946. She was scrapped at New Orleans in November 1961.

== Kenyon L. Butterfield ==
Kenyon L. Butterfield was built by New England Shipbuilding Corporation. Her keel was laid on 1 September 1944. She was launched on 17 October and delivered on 31 October. Laid up in the Hudson River post-war, she was scrapped at Kearny in April 1967.

== Kermit Roosevelt ==
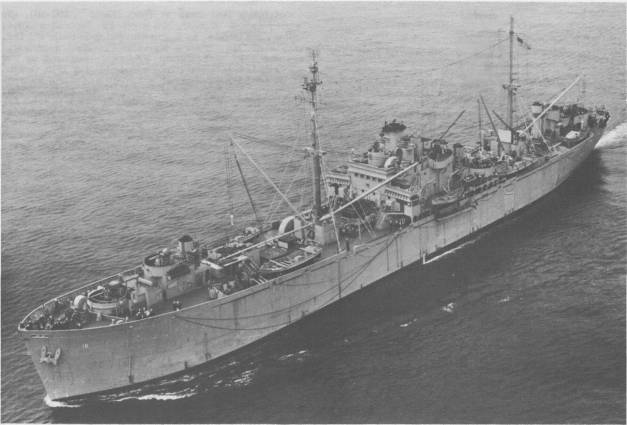
USS Kermit Roosevelt

Kermit Roosevelt was built by Bethlehem Fairfield Shipyard, Baltimore, Maryland. Her keel was laid as Deal Island on 30 August 1944. She was launched as Kermit Roosevelt on 5 October and delivered to the United States Navy on 21 October. Placed in reserve at Bremerton, Washington in October 1959. To United States Maritime Administration in June 1960 and renamed Deal Island. Scrapped at Portland, Oregon in August 1960.

== Key Pittman ==
Key Pittman was built by Permanente Metals Corporation. Her keel was laid on 21 November 1942. She was launched on 22 December and delivered on 31 December. To the United States Navy in October 1943 and renamed Leonis. Converted for naval use by Poole, MacGonigle & Co., Portland, Oregon. Returned to WSA in December 1945 and renamed Key Pittman. Laid up in reserve. She was scrapped at Wilmington, Delaware in June 1969.

== King Hathaway ==
King Hathaway was built by Delta Shipbuilding Company. Her keel was laid on 12 September 1944. She was launched on 24 October and delivered on 18 November. Laid up in the Hudson River post-war, she was scrapped at Gandia, Spain in April 1971.

== King S. Woolsey ==
King S. Woolsey was a limited troop carrier built by California Shipbuilding Corporation. Her keel was laid on 9 November 1942. She was launched on 13 December and delivered on 29 December. Built for the WSA, she was operated under the management of A. H. Bull & Co. Management transferred to Coastwise Line in 1948. Sold in 1951 to American Pacific Steamship Co., San Francisco, California and renamed Ampac Nevada. Sold in 1956 to Muskegon Corp. and renamed Muskegon. Reflagged to Liberia and operated under the management of Transoceanic Marine Inc. Sold later that year to World Luck Corp., remaining under the same flag and management. Sold in 1961 to Menehaus Shipping Co. Operated under the management of Niarchos Ltd. Sold in 1964 to Alexandra Navigation Corp. and renamed Linda. Operated under the management of Eddie Steamship Co. Management transferred to W. H. Eddie Hsu in 1967. She was scrapped at Kaohsiung in April 1969.

== Kit Carson ==
Kit Carson was built by Permanente Metals Corporation. Her keel was laid on 17 September 1941. She was launched on 6 February 1942 and delivered on 31 March. She was scrapped at Portland, Oregon in February 1966.

== Knute Nelson ==
Knute Nelson was built by California Shipbuilding Corporation. Her keel was laid on 24 February 1943. She was launched on 22 March and delivered on 6 April. She was scrapped in April 1970, either at Kearny or Panama City, Florida.

== Knute Rockne ==
Knute Rockne was built by Permanente Metals Corporation. Her keel was laid on 9 April 1943. She was launched on 6 May and delivered on 18 May. Laid up at Mobile post-war, she was scrapped there in May 1972.

== Kochab ==
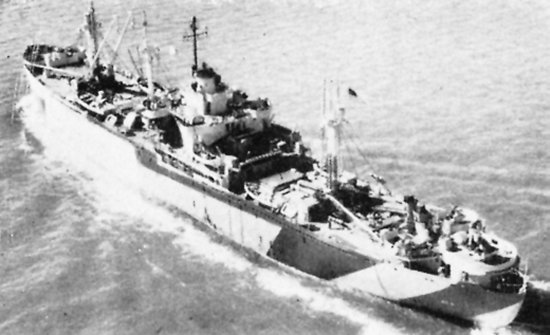
USS Kochab

Kochab was built by Delta Shipbuilding Company. Her keel was laid on 18 February 1944. She was launched on 30 March and delivered on 30 April. To the United States Navy. Converted for naval use by Alabama Drydock and Shipbuilding Company, Mobile. Laid up in reserve at Pearl Harbor, Hawaii in April 1946. Towed to San Francisco in September 1967 and returned to the United States Maritime Commission. Laid up in Suisun Bay. She was scrapped at Richmond in April 1965.

== Kuban ==
Kuban was built by Oregon Shipbuilding Corporation. Her keel was laid on 16 April 1943. She was launched as William G. T'Vault on 5 May and delivered as Kuban on 13 May. To the Soviet Union. Reported scrapped in 1971 and deleted from shipping registers in 1981/82.

== Kyle V. Johnson ==
Kyle V. Johnson was built by Todd Houston Shipbuilding Corporation. Her keel was laid on 20 June 1944. She was launched on 28 July and delivered on 10 August. Built for the WSA, she was operated under the management of Waterman Steamship Co. Laid up at Mobile post-war, she was scrapped at Panama City, Florida in 1975.
