= MV Hope =

Bangladeshi cargo ship

History

Bangladesh
- Name: Hope
- Owner: Trade Bridge Shipping
- Launched: 26 January 1990
- Completed: 1990
- Identification: IMO number: 8921482; MMSI number: 405000118; Callsign: S2CX

General characteristics
- Class & type: General cargo ship
- Tonnage: 5,552 GT
- Length: 97 m (318 ft 3 in)
- Beam: 18 m (59 ft 1 in)
- Draft: 7.4 m (24 ft 3 in)

MV Hope was a Bangladeshi general cargo built in 1990 in Japan. The ship ran aground in 2004 and capsized in 2013, both with loss of life of crewmembers.

== Description ==
Hope was a general cargo ship that was 97 m (318 ft) long, 18 m (59 ft) wide, and had a draft of 7.2 m (24 ft). It was made of steel and had a gross register tonnage of 5,550. The ship was powered by a single diesel engine and propelled by a single shaft screw propeller. In 2013, it carried a crew of seventeen.

== History ==
Hope was built as Asean Trader by Kurushima Dockyards in Japan in 1990.

=== 2004 grounding ===
On 30 August 2004, the ship ran aground during a typhoon near Uwajima, Japan, with a loss of four crew. Hope was declared a total loss, but was later repaired and returned to service.

=== 2013 capsizing ===
On 4 July 2013, Hope was transiting from Malaysia to Chittagong, Bangladesh while overloaded with a cargo of ball clay. The ship developed a list to one side and eventually capsized during rough weather off the coast of Phuket, Thailand. The crewmen attempted to jump into a lifeboat, from which five of the crew were rescued by the German cargo ship Buxmoon later that day. Buxmoon also retrieved two bodies the following day, which it handed over to the Thai Navy, that were assumed to be from Hope. A sixth crewmember was pulled from the sea by a Thai Navy helicopter and flown to a hospital in Phuket.

A search and rescue operation by the Thai Navy was fully underway by the following day. Three more crewmembers who were adrift in life rings were rescued on Friday by HTMS Pattani and evacuated by helicopter. Operations to salvage the still-afloat ship began as well, and an attempt was made to tow Hope into port. After continued searching found no more crewmembers, the Thai Navy called off the search on 8 July. That same day, the five men rescued by Buxmoon arrived back in Bangladesh after the ship docked in Chittagong.
