= List of ships built by Harland & Wolff =

The following is a list of ships that were built by Harland & Wolff, a heavy industrial company which specialises in shipbuilding and offshore construction, and is based in Belfast, Northern Ireland, as well as having had yards at Govan (1914–1963) and Greenock (1920–1928) in Scotland. The 1,600 ships are listed in order of the date of their launch.
