= MV Banglar Samriddhi =

Bangladeshi bulk carrier

History

Bangladesh
- Name: Banglar Samriddhi
- Owner: Bangladesh Shipping Corporation
- Builder: (China) Jiangsu New Yangzi Shipbuilding
- Yard number: 1237
- Completed: 18 September 2018
- Identification: IMO number: 9793832; MMSI number: 405000241; Callsign: S2AI6

General characteristics
- Class & type: LR-class bulk carrier
- Tonnage: 25,818 GT; 38,896 DWT
- Length: 180 m (590 ft 7 in)
- Beam: 32 m (105 ft 0 in)
- Draft: 6.5 m (21 ft 4 in)
- Crew: 29

MV Banglar Samriddhi is a Bangladeshi bulk carrier built in 2018 which was struck by a missile in the Black Sea during the 2022 Russian invasion of Ukraine.

== Description ==
The Banglar Samriddhi is an LR-class bulk carrier built by the Jiangsu New Yangzi Shipbuilders in Jingjiang, China. It has a beam of 32 m (105 ft 0 in), is 180 m (590 ft 7 in) long, and has a draft of 6.5 m (21 ft 4 in). Its gross tonnage is 25,818 GT and it has a deadweight of 38,894 tons. In 2022 it was valuated at $21.5 million with a $6 million scrap value.

== History ==
Banglar Samriddhi was laid down in Jingjiang, China, and built by Jiansu New Yangzi Shipbuilding under the yard number 1237. The ship was completed on 18 September 2018 for the Bangladesh Shipping Corporation.

=== Missile strike incident ===
On 24 February 2022, the Banglar Samriddhi arrived in the port of Olvia in the Black Sea bearing no cargo. It was intended to load ball clay and then steam for Italy. However, when Russia launched its invasion of Ukraine, the Banglar Samriddhi was stuck in port. On 1 March, the vessel was struck by a missile while still at anchor. One of its crew, third engineer Hadisur Rahman, was killed by the missile after it detonated on the bridge. The rest of the crew were unharmed and the fire on the ship was put out. Following the incident, the vessel was left in port and its surviving 28 crewmembers were evacuated to Bangladesh.

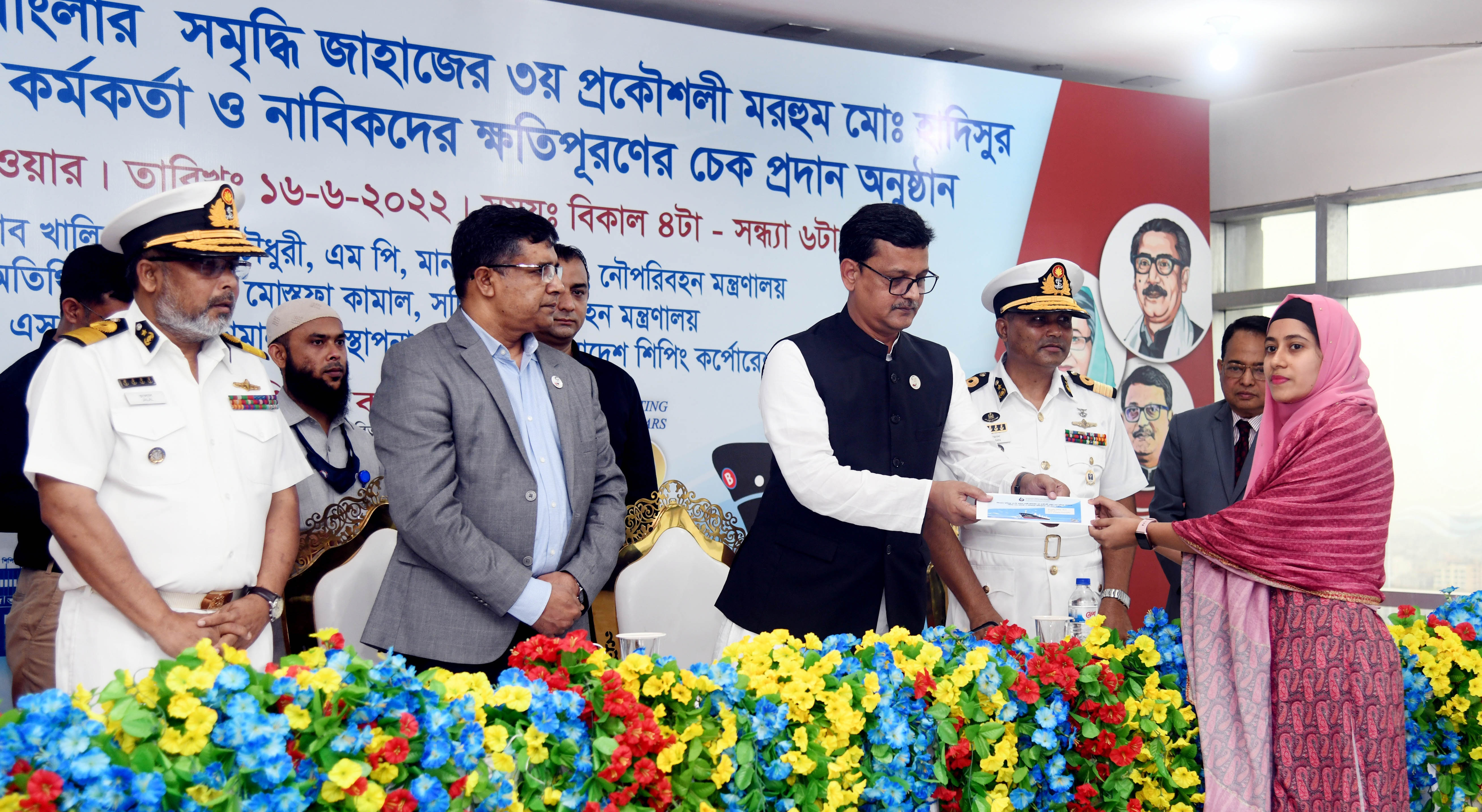
State Minister of Shipping Khalid Mahmud Chowdhury distributing compensation checks to the family of Md. Hadisur Rahman and other crew members in June 2022.

Hadisur Rahman was a 29-year-old sailor from Barguna. He had three younger siblings. Rahman admitted the Chattogram Marine Academy after scoring GPA-5 in SSC and HSC. Afterwards he joined Banglar Samriddhi as an engineer in 2018. On the vessel he was the third engineer. Rahman was the sole breadwinner for the family. He planned to build a new house for his family upon his return. The body of Rahman was sent to Bangladesh and arrived in Dhaka via Romania and Turkey 3 March 2022.

The Bangladesh Shipping Corporation, which owns the Banglar Samriddhi, announced that it would seek $22.4 million from its insurers, the Sadharan Bima Corporation and Tysers. The action represents the first marine insurance claim caused by the conflict in Ukraine. Following the evacuation of the ship's sailors, Bangladesh also announced that it was abandoning the Banglar Samriddhi in Ukraine, a move approved by Ukrainian maritime authorities.
