= List of amphibious warfare vessels of the Turkish Navy =

This is a list of Turkish Navy amphibious warfare vessels that have served past and present, from 10 July 1920 to present.

== Tank landing ships ==
=== LST class ===
Bayraktar class tank landing ship

Name	Builder	Launched	Acquired	Fate
TCG Bayraktar (L-402)	(Turkey)	3 October 2015	14 April 2017	
TCG Sancaktar (L-403)	(Turkey)	19 July 2016	7 April 2018	

=== Ex-US Terrebonne Parish class ===
Ertuğrul class tank landing ship (Ex- (United States) US Navy Terrebonne Parish class tank landing ship):

Name	Builder	Launched	Acquired	Fate
TCG Ertuğrul (L-401)	(United States)	Ex-USS Windham County (LST-1170)	4 June 1973	Out of service in March 2017
TCG Serdar (L-402)	(United States)	Ex-USS Westchester County (LST-1167)	27 August 1974	Decommissioned in 2011 & sunk as a target in May 2014

=== Çakabey ===
Name	Builder	Launched	Commissioned	Fate
TCG Çakabey (NL-122)	(Turkey) Taşkızak Naval Shipyard, Istanbul	30 June 1977		

=== Sarucabey class ===
Sarucabey class tank landing ship:

Name	Builder	Launched	Acquired	Fate
TCG Sarucabey (NL-123)	(Turkey) Taşkızak Naval Shipyard, Istanbul	30 July 1981	26 July 1984	Extant in 2010
TCG Karamürselbey (NL-124)	(Turkey) Taşkızak Naval Shipyard, Istanbul	26 July 1984	26 July 1985	Extant in 2010

=== Osmangazi class ===
Osmangazi class tank landing ship:

Name	Builder	Launched	Commissioned	Fate
TCG Osmangazi (NL-125)	(Turkey) Taşkızak Naval Shipyard, Istanbul		27 July 1994	In use as of 2023
TCG Orhangazi (NL-126)	(Turkey) Taşkızak Naval Shipyard, Istanbul		October 1994	

=== Tank landing craft ===
==== Ex-British LCT Mk IV type ====
Ex-British LCT Mk IV type:

Name	Builder	Launched	Acquired	Fate
Ç-101	(United States)			
Ç-102	(United States)			
Ç-103	(United States)			
Ç-104	(United States)			
Ç-105	(United States)			
Ç-106	(United States)			

==== Ex-French EDIC type ====
Ç-107 - Ç-138

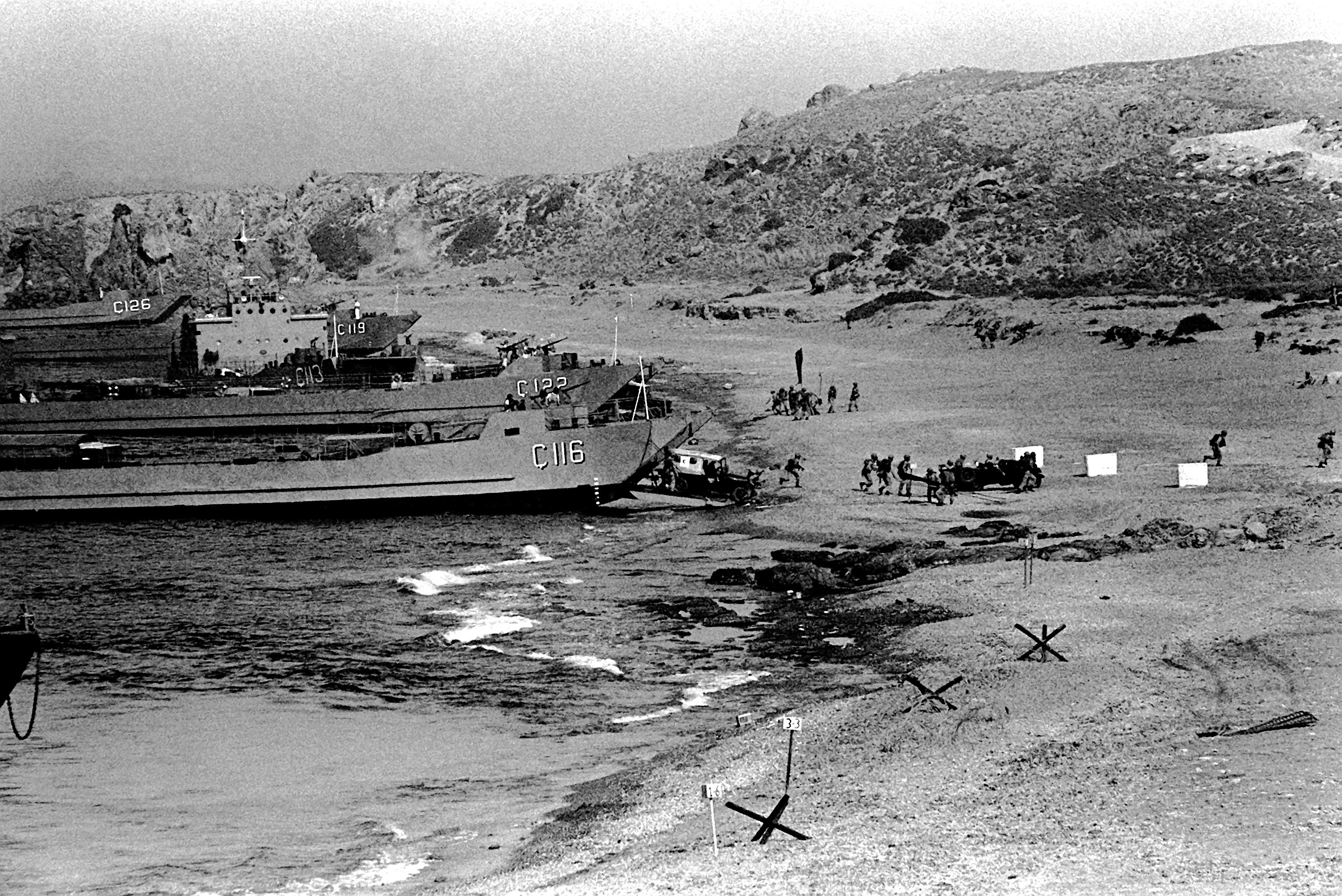
EDIC type LCT class amphibious warfare vessels Ç-116, Ç-122, Ç-113, Ç-119 and Ç-126 in 1981

Name	Builder	Launched	Acquired	Fate
Ç-107				
Ç-108				
Ç-109				
Ç-110				
Ç-111				
Ç-112				
Ç-113				
Ç-114				
Ç-115				
Ç-116				
Ç-117				
Ç-118				
Ç-119				
Ç-120				Extant in 2010
Ç-121				
Ç-122				
Ç-123				Extant in 2010
Ç-124				
Ç-125				Extant in 2010
Ç-126				Extant in 2010
Ç-127				Extant in 2010
Ç-128				Extant in 2010
Ç-129				
Ç-130				
Ç-131				
Ç-132				Extant in 2010
Ç-133				Extant in 2010
Ç-134				Extant in 2010
Ç-135				Extant in 2010
Ç-136				
Ç-137				Extant in 2010
Ç-138				Extant in 2010

==== Ex-US LCU-501 class ====
Ex-US LCU-501 class

Name	Builder	Launched	Acquired	Fate
Ç-201	(United States)		June 1967	
Ç-202	(United States)		June 1967	
Ç-203	(United States)		June 1967	
Ç-204	(United States)		June 1967	

==== LCU type ====
Ç-205 - Ç-216

Name	Builder	Launched	Acquired	Fate
Ç-205				
Ç-206				
Ç-207				
Ç-208				
Ç-209				
Ç-210				
Ç-211				
Ç-212				
Ç-213				
Ç-214				
Ç-215				
Ç-216				

==== Ex-US LCM-8 type ====
Ex- (United States) US Navy LCM-8:

Name	Builder	Launched	Acquired	Fate
Ç-301				
Ç-302				
Ç-303				
Ç-304				
Ç-305				Extant in 2010
Ç-306				
Ç-307				
Ç-308				Extant in 2010
Ç-309				
Ç-310				
Ç-311				
Ç-312				Extant in 2010
Ç-313				
Ç-314				Extant in 2010
Ç-315				
Ç-316				Extant in 2010
Ç-317				
Ç-318				
Ç-319				Extant in 2010
Ç-320				
Ç-321				Extant in 2010
Ç-322				Extant in 2010
Ç-323				Extant in 2010
Ç-324				Extant in 2010
Ç-325				Extant in 2010
Ç-326				Extant in 2010
Ç-327				Extant in 2010
Ç-328				
Ç-329				Extant in 2010
Ç-330				Extant in 2010
Ç-331				Extant in 2010

==== Ç-139 class ====
Ç-139 class - (currently categorized by the Turkish Navy as Ç-117 class)

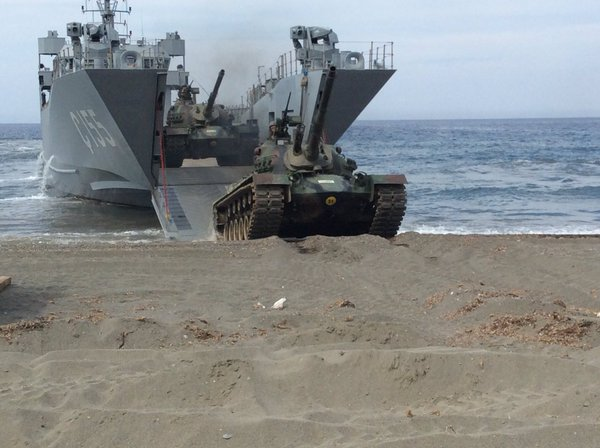
Ç-155 perform an off load of a Turkish Main Battle Tank, 2016

Name	Builder	Launched	Acquired	Fate
Ç-139				Extant in 2010
Ç-140				Extant in 2010
Ç-141				Extant in 2010
Ç-142				Extant in 2010
Ç-143				Extant in 2010
Ç-144				Extant in 2010
Ç-145				Extant in 2010
Ç-146				Extant in 2010
Ç-147				Extant in 2010
Ç-148				Extant in 2010
Ç-149				Extant in 2010
Ç-150				Extant in 2010
Ç-151				
Ç-152				
Ç-153				
Ç-154				
Ç-155				
