= List of ships of the Illawarra Steam Navigation Company =

The Illawarra Steam Navigation Company serviced the south coast of New South Wales between 1858 and 1955. During this period they owned over 20 vessels, ranging from riverboats to the 1111 ton passenger vessel, Merimbula.

Name	Built	Length	Tonnage	Type	Construction	Status
Allowrie			503 tons	Twin-screw steamer		
Bega	1883 (Greenock, Scotland)	57.7m	567 tons	Twin-screw steamer	Iron	Capsized and sunk off Tanja Beach, 5 April 1908, with the death on one passenger.
Benandra	1914 (Balmain, Sydney)	39.62m	345 tons	Screw steamer	Wood	Lost off Moruya River at Moruya Heads after hitting a sandspit, 25 March 1924, with at least one death.
Bergalia						
Blackwall	1874 (Brisbane Water, New South Wales)	23.04m	66 ton	Screw steamer	Wood	Wrecked after her anchor dragged on Shellharbour Reef, 20 July, 1876. Although refloated, she was eventually broken up in Sydney.
Bodalla	1914 (Balmain, Sydney)	39.62m	345 ton	Twin-screw steamer	Wood	Wrecked on 19 January 1924 at Narooma, when she ran aground at the entrance to the Wagonga inlet.
Cobargo						
Coolangatta	1865 (Balmain, Sydney)	30.17m	87 ton	Paddle steamer	Unknown	Wrecked at Crookhaven River on 27 February 1873, while traveling between Terrara and Pig Island. Refloated, she was broken up around 1880.
Duroby	1920 (Manning River, Sydney)	37m	195 ton	Screw steamer	Steel	Caught fire while at anchor in 1923, then sold to be used as a lighter. She was eventually scuttled.
Eden	1900 (Glasgow, Scotland)	60.04m	693 ton	Twin-screw steamer	Steel	Scuttled in 1933.
The Hunter	1860?		300 tons			
Illawarra	1878		522 tons	Paddle steamer		Retired 1908.
John Penn	1867 (Middlesex, United Kingdom)	48.76m	236 ton	Screw steamer	Iron	Wrecked after hitting Burrowarra Head in heavy fog, sank at Broulee Bay while under tow.
Kameruka	1880 (Greencock, Scotland)	54.74m	515 ton	Screw steamer	Steel	Sank on 16 October 1897, after striking Pedro's reef near Moruya.
Kembla	1860?					
Kiama	1860?					
Merimbula	1909 (Troon, Scotland)	63.88m	1111 ton	Screw steamer	Steel	Ran aground on Whale Point at Currarong, just north of Jervis Bay, while heading south on 27 March 1928.
Moruya	1906 (Preston, England)					
Tilba	1908 (Manning River, New South Wales)	38.4m	200 ton	Screw steamer	Wood	Wrecked after running into rocks off Summercloud Bay, 18 November 1912.
William the Fourth	1831 (Erringhi)(now Clarence Town)		26.2m	77 ton	Paddle steamer	
