= List of vessels of the Bombay Marine (1798) =

The vessels below were listed in 1798 as serving the Bombay Marine, the naval arm of the British East India Company (EIC). The list of names and armaments comes from the Bombay Almanack and Register for 1798. Most of the vessels, especially the ones for which we have a burthen, were built for the EIC at the Bombay Dockyard.

Name	Type	Launch	Burthen	Guns	Remarks
Alert	Schooner	1795		10 × 2-pounder guns	Lost 1798 (replaced in 1802 by the captured l'Eugenie, renamed Alert)
Antelope	Brig	1793	199	12 × 4-pounder guns	Sold after 1830
Bombay	Ship	1793	639, or 67183/94, or 693	24 × 12-pounder + 8 × 6-pounder guns	Sold to the Admiralty in 1805; renamed HMS Ceylon in 1808; broken up 1861
Drake	Ship	1787		14 × 6-pounder guns	
Fly	Brig	1793	176	14 × 6-pounder guns	
Intrepid	Ship	1780		14 × 6-pounder guns	
Panther	Snow	1778	181	12 × 4-pounder + 2 × 3-pounder guns	
Princess Augusta	Snow	1768		12 × 3-pounder guns	Originally a grab
Princess Royal	Ketch	1768		12 × 3-pounder guns	Originally a grab
Queen	Ketch	1768		10 × 3-pounder guns + 4 swivel guns	
Rodney	Ketch			10 × 4-pounder guns + 10 swivel guns	
Strombolo (or Stromboli)	Bomb ketch	1793	68	12 × 3-pounder guns	Lost 1809
Swift	Ship			20 × 6-pounder guns	On the beach at Ambonya in 1801, partly broken up and without a crew. Replaced by a purchased vessel that continued the name.
Viper	Snow	1755		10 × 3-pounder guns + 4 swivel guns	New boat February 1755; launched by Bombay Dockyard for the Bombay Marine as Revenge, but renamed before completion, the name Revenge being wanted for a larger ship.
