= List of Greece-flagged cargo ships =

This list consists of cargo ships which are registered in Greece and subject to the laws of that country. Any ship which flew the flag at any point in its career, and is present in the encyclopedia, is listed here.

== List of ships ==
Name	Owner	Year built	Type	Gross tonnage	Status
Aeolian Sky	Proteus Maritime SA	1977	Freighter	10,715	Sank following a collision off Guernsey on 4 November 1979.
Aghia Thalassini	Tamara Compagnia Naviera	1944	Hansa A type cargo ship	2,742	Scrapped in May 1974.
Aghios Nectarios	Kyrle Compagnia Naviera SA	1944	Hansa A type cargo ship	1,925	Scrapped in Spain in January 1944.
Akastos	Blue X Transocean Co	1946	General cargo ship	7,331	Scrapped in Hamburg on 4 August 1968.
Alfios	Theofano Maritime	1919	B-class standard cargo ship	3,154	Wrecked off Nova Scotia in April 1946.
Alkimini		1937	General cargo ship	764	Wrecked off Cheka on 27 November 1976.
Alkimos	Alkimos Shipping Company	1943	Liberty ship	7,176	Wrecked in May 1964.
Anastasis	K Psychas	1907	Cargo steamship	4,749	Scrapped 4 April 1934 in Shanghai.
Andrios	Goulandris Brothers	1901	General cargo ship	4,438	Wrecked on 20 November 1926.
Andromachi	Dalia Cia. Nav. SA	1945	General cargo ship	7,056	Destroyed by fire in 1969, scrapped in 1976 in Egypt.
Anglia	Hellenic Mediterranean Lines	1945	Hansa A type cargo ship	1,925	Scrapped in April 1974.
Arietta	Livanos Maritime Co Ltd	1941	General cargo ship	7,460	Ran aground and lost on 17 March 1960.
Armonia	Synodinos Brothers	1924	General cargo ship	2,740	Scrapped in 1960 in Hong Kong.
Auriga	Hellenic Mediterranean Lines	1944	Hansa A type cargo ship	1,923	Scrapped in 1965 in Bremerhaven.
Captain Theo	J & A T Vatis	1942	Decommissioned escort carrier	7,129	Scrapped on 21 April 1976 in Taiwan.
Express Santorini	Agapitos Express Ferries	1974	RO-RO	7,821	In service.
Marionga J. Goulandris	Goulandris Brothers	1922	General cargo ship	5,396	Torpedoed by German submarine U-172 on 23 November 1942.
Max Wolf	Georges Portolo	1917	Freighter	6,694	Bombed by German planes off the coast of France on 9 June 1940.
Panorea	Compania Panorea SA	1940	General cargo ship	4,558	Scrapped in 1974.
Petrola II	John S Lastis	1945	Coastal tanker	890	Ran aground and subsequently scrapped in 1970.
Tasmania	Hellenic Mediterranean Lines	1940	C3-class cargo ship	11,762	Scrapped in New Orleans in 1962.
