= USS Oahu =

Two ships of the United States Navy have been named Oahu after Oahu, the third largest of the Hawaiian Islands.

- USS Oahu (PR-6), was launched 26 November 1927 and sunk by enemy torpedoes on 5 May 1942.
- USS Oahu (ARG-5), was launched 9 September 1943 and decommissioned in January 1947.
