= List of sailing ships of the Ottoman Empire =

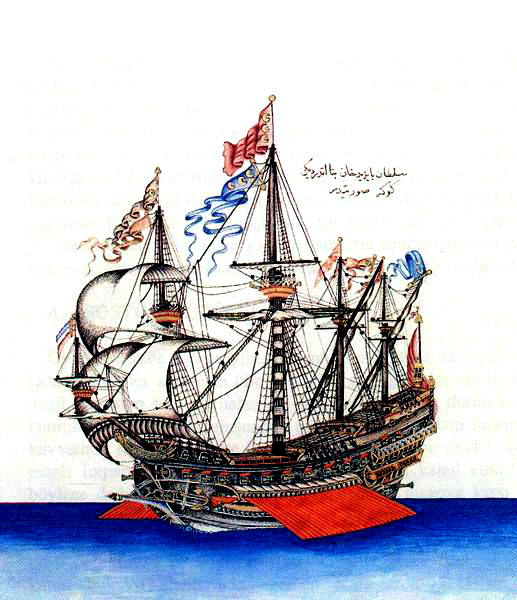
The Göke, flagship of Kemal Reis, as depicted in an Ottoman miniature at the Topkapi Palace.

This is a list of known sailing warships of the Ottoman Empire and its various North African vassal states and dependencies, from the origin of the empire in the Late Middle Ages to 1859. During this period, the Ottomans used both oar-powered galleys and more conventional ships of the line, along with various hybrid designs. Many entries are based on Western sources, therefore the names may be misspelled or not reflect the original name of the vessel, but that given by foreign observers and captors.

== Core Ottoman or Turkish vessels ==
Ottoman galleys engaging the Holy League's fleet at the Battle of Lepanto, 1571.

=== 15th century ===
- Göke (1495), an oar-powered galleon used as flagship by Kemal Reis. She could transport 700 men and was armed with an unknown number of cannons. Boarded and burned by the Venetians during the Battle of Zonchio (1499).
- ?, sister ship of the former, used by Kemal's brother, Burak Reis.

=== 16th century ===
- La Sultana, flagship galley of Ali Pasha at the Battle of Lepanto (1571). Captured by the Spanish after she attempted to board Don John of Austria's flagship, La Real.

=== 17th century ===
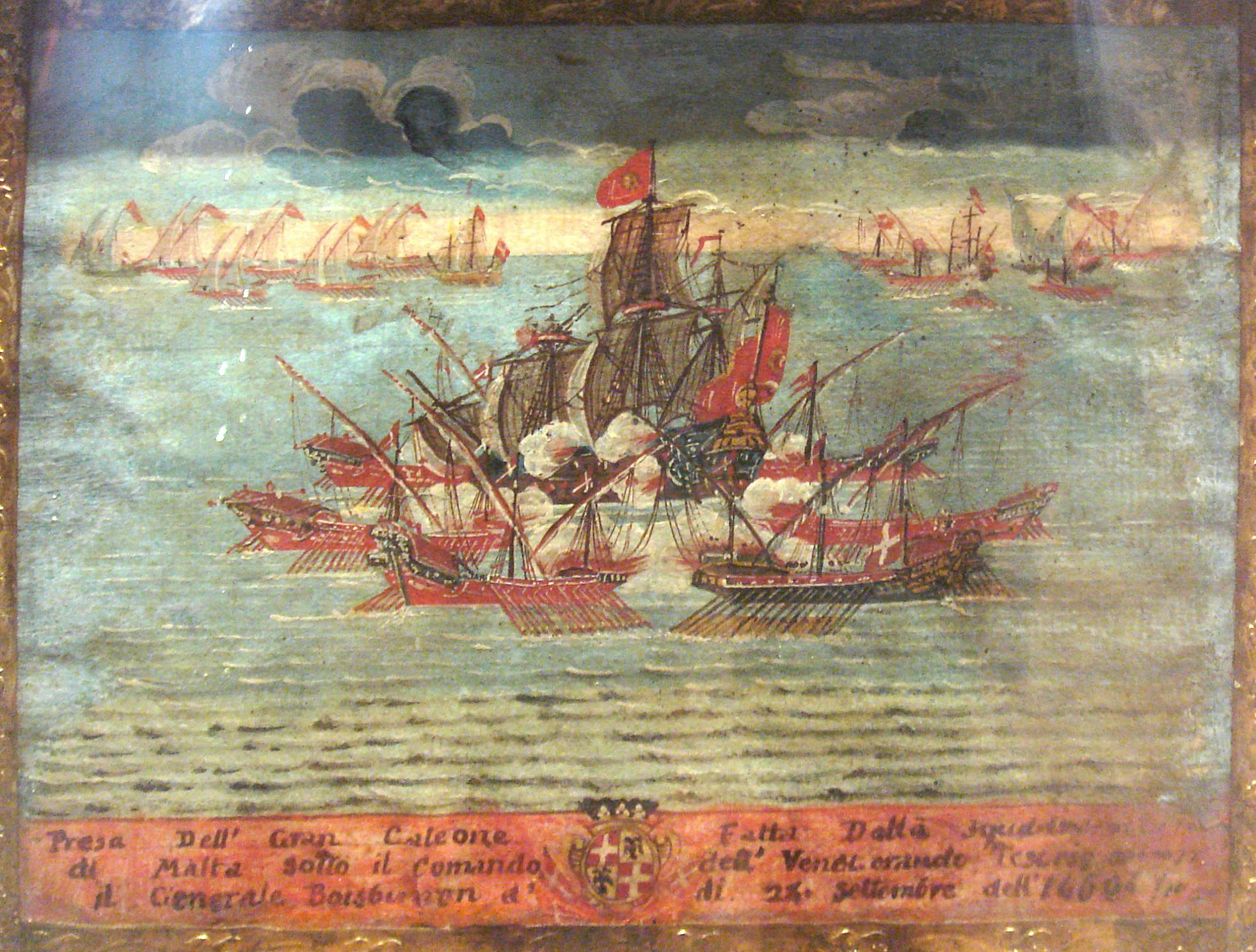
Capture of a Turkish galleon by galleys of the Sovereign Military Order of Malta (1650).

- Comte Maurice, armed with 50 cannons and sunk in 1609.
- ?, 60? cannon, captured by the Kingdom of Naples in 1618.
- ?, 50 cannon, sunk in 1630.
- ?, 50 cannon.
- ?, 46 cannon.
- ?, 54 cannon, captured by the Knights of Malta and sunk in 1654.
- Tre Naranceri, 40 cannon, sunk in 1662.
- ?, 60-70? cannon, captured by privateers in 1669.
- ?, 60-70? cannon, blew up in 1669.
- Nachis, 70 cannon, burnt in 1686.
- ? (ex-Venetian San Iseppo or San Giuseppe, captured 1690), 44 cannon. Possibly captured by the Regency of Algiers rather than the Ottoman imperial fleet.
- Beneghem, 66 cannon, captured by Malta in 1700.

=== 18th century ===
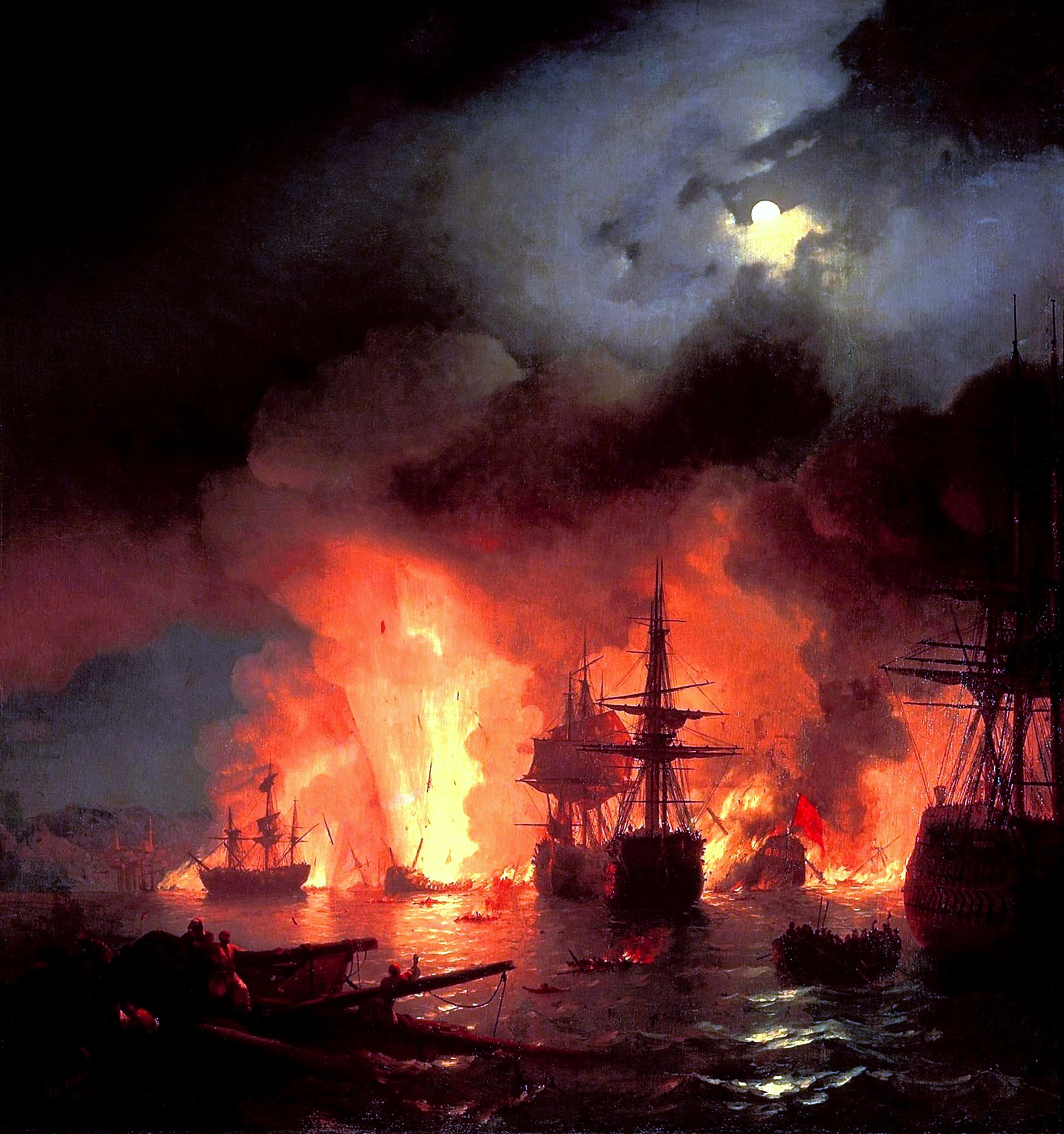
Battle of Chesma at night, by Ivan Aivazovsky (1848).

- ? (ex-Russian Bozhie Predvyedenie, captured 1710), 58 cannon.
- ? (ex-Russian Lastka, captured 1710), 50 cannon.
- ?, 48 cannon, captured by Malta in 1732.
- ? (ex-Swedish Sverige 80), wrecked during transfer voyage in 1738.
- Corona Ottomana, 70 cannon. Carried by mutinied galley slaves to Malta in 1760 and renamed San Salvadore. Acquired by France and returned to the Ottoman Empire in 1762.
- Real Mustafa, 84 cannon. Blew up at the Battle of Chesma in 1770.
- ?, 100 cannon. Ottoman flagship at Chesma, where it was burnt.
- ?, 50 cannon, burnt at Chesma.
- ?, 50 cannon, burnt at Chesma.
- Rodos, 60 cannon, captured by the Russians at Chesma and sunk in 1770.
- ?, 66 cannon, run aground and destroyed at Kos in 1770.
- ?, 74 cannon, destroyed in Mytilene in 1771.
- ?, 74 cannon, also destroyed in Mitylene in 1771.
- ?, 54-60 cannon, blew up in 1787.
- ? (ex-Russian Maria Magadalina, captured 1787), 66 cannon.
- ?, 64 cannon, burnt in 1788.
- ?, 64 cannon, also burnt in 1788.
- ?, 54 cannon, run aground and captured by Russia in 1788, renamed Leontii Mutchenik.

==== Battle of Tendra (1790) ====
- Bahr-ı Zafer, 72 cannon, flagship of Giritli Hüseyin.
- Melik-ı Bahri, 72 cannon, flagship of Patrona Bey. Sunk in a storm after being damaged and captured by the Russians.
- Anka-ı Bahri, 72 cannon.
- Fethü'l Fettah, 66 cannon.
- Nüvid-ı Fütuh, 66 cannon.
- Peleng-ı Bahri, 66 cannon, captured.
- Tevfikullah, 66 cannon.
- Feyz-ı Hüda, 66 cannon, flagship of Riyale Bey.
- Mesudiye, 58 cannon.
- Mansuriye, 58 cannon, flagship of Said Bey. Caught fire and exploded after being captured. Called Kapitana by the Russians.
- Inayet-ı Hakk, 58 cannon.
- Burc-ı Zafer, 52 cannon.
- Şehbaz-ı Bahri, 52 cannon.
- Ukâb-ı Bahri, 52 cannon.
- Mazhar-ı Hidâyet, 38 cannon.
- Mazhar-ı Saadet, 38 cannon.
- Mebdâ-i Nusret, 32 cannon.
- Raad-ı Bahri, 20 cannon, a bomb frigate.
- Berk-i Bahri, 20 cannon, bomb frigate.
- Berk-i Hafız, 20 cannon, bomb frigate.
- Şihab-ı Sakıb, 20 cannon, bomb frigate.
- Cedid Bomba, 20 cannon, bomb frigate.

=== 19th century ===
- ?, 64 cannon, run aground and sunk in 1807.
- ?, destroyed by a fireship in 1821.
- Mansur el liwa, 84 cannon, destroyed by a fireship in 1822.
- ?, destroyed by a fireship in 1822.
- Ainduie, 74 cannon.
- Bekberi-kufret, 74 cannon.
- Faouish, 100 cannon.
- Fivrie, 74 cannon.
- Mânsuriye, 74 cannon Ship of Line, Sunk in 1822.
- Nizâmiye, 72 cannon.
- Raousierie, 100 cannon.

==== Battle of Athos (1807) ====
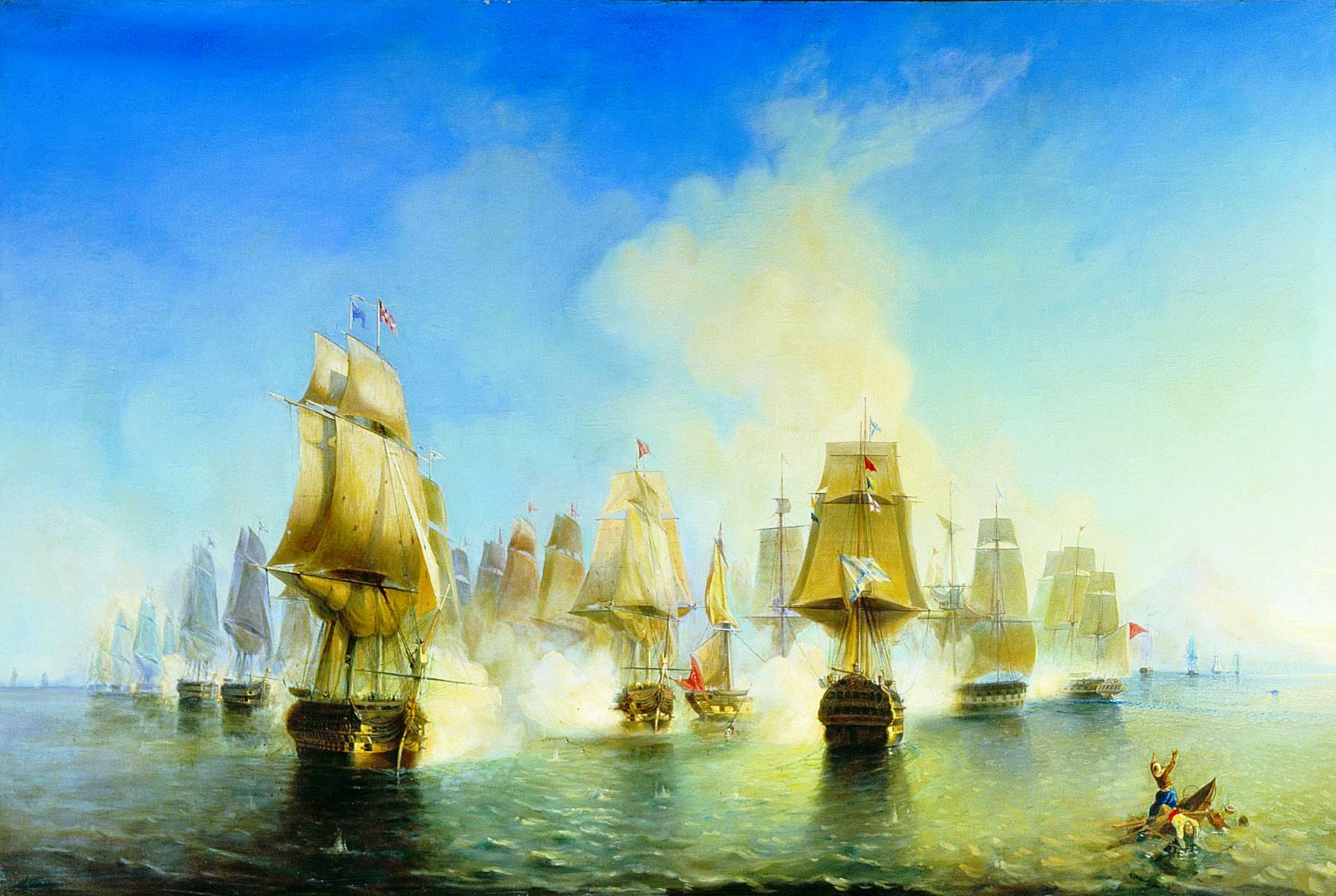
Battle of Athos by Alexey Bogolyubov (1853).

- Masudiya, 120 cannon, flagship of Seyit Ali.
- Sadd al-Bahr (or Sedd-ül Bahir), 84 cannon, ship of second-in-command Bekir Bey. Captured by the Russians, it was captured from them by the French in 1809.
- Anka-yi bahri, 84 cannon.
- Taus-i bahri, 84 cannon.
- Tevfik-numa, 84 cannon.
- Bisharet or Biafaret, 84 cannon. Run aground and scuttled.
- Kilid-i bahri, 84 cannon.
- Sayyad-i bahri, 74 cannon.
- Gulbang-i-Nusrat, 74 cannon.
- Jebel-andaz, 74 cannon.
- Meskeni-ghazi, a 50 cannon frigate.
- Bedr-i zafar, 50 cannon frigate.
- Fahki-i zafar, 50 cannon frigate.
- Nessim, 50 cannon frigate. Run aground and scuttled.
- Iskenderiya, 44 cannon frigate.
- Metelin, a 32 cannon sloop. Run aground and scuttled.
- Rahbar-i alam, 28 cannon sloop.
- Denyuvet?, 32 cannon.
- Alamat i Nusrat, 18 cannon.
- Melankai?, 18 cannon.

==== Battle of Navarino (1827) ====
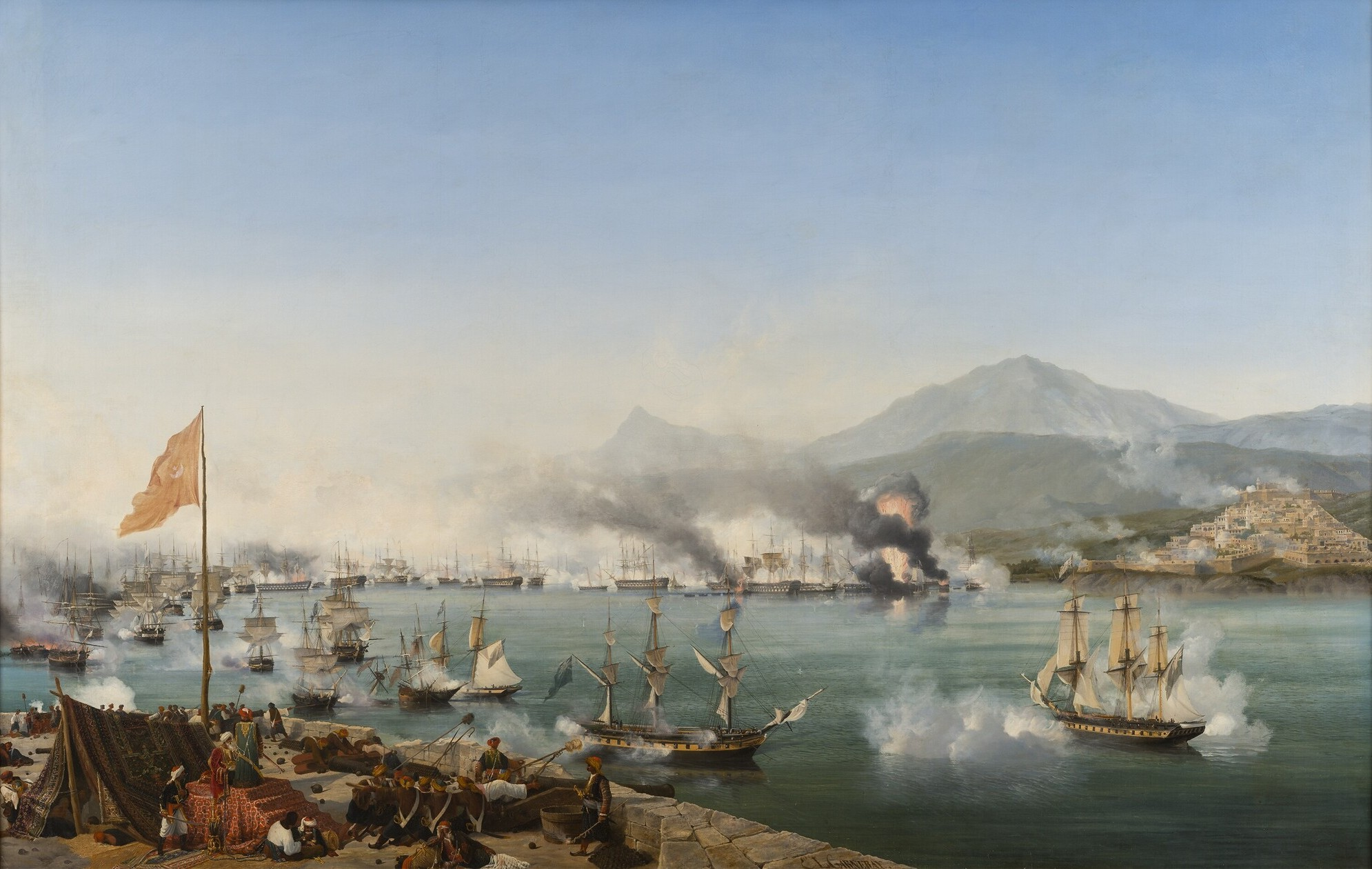
Battle of Navarino.

- Ghiuh Rewan, an 84 cannon third-rate, flagship of Ibrahim Pasha.
- Fahti Bahri, a 74 cannon third-rate, sunk.
- Burj Zafer, a 70 cannon third-rate.
- Ihsanya, 64 cannon.
- Surya, 56 cannon.
- Leone, 60 cannon.
- Fevz Nusrat, 64 cannon.
- Ka'id Zafer, 64 cannon.

==== Post-Navarino ships of the line (1839) ====
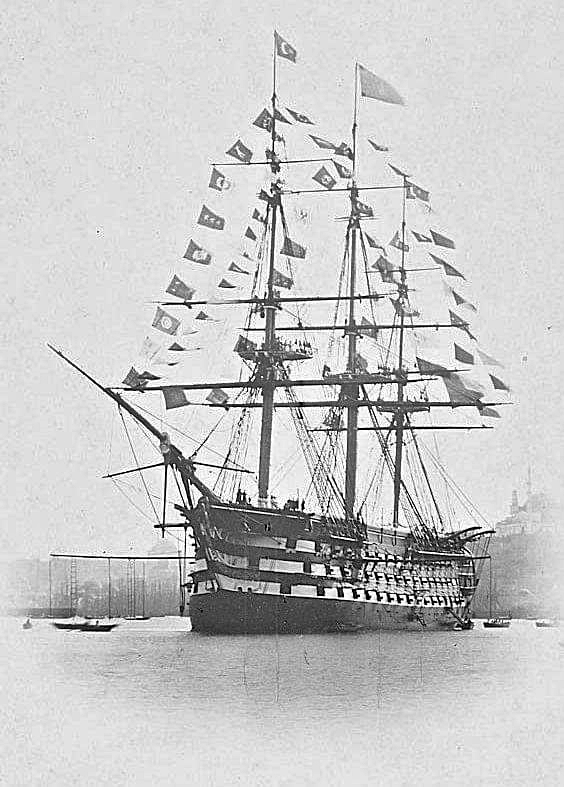
Mahmudiye, the largest warship in the world at the time of its construction in 1829.

- Mukkademe-i Hayir (built 1806), 74 cannon.
- Selimiye (1809), 128 cannon.
- Necm-i Zafer (1815), 74 cannon.
- Hifz-i Rahmân (1826), 64 cannon.
- Fethiye (1827), 96 cannon.
- Mahmudiye (1829), 128 cannon.
- Memdûhiye (1833), 96 cannon.
- Teşrifiye (1834), 96 cannon.
- Teşvikiye (1834), 96 cannon.
- Nusretiye (1835), 64 cannon.
- Tevfikiye (1836), 64 cannon.
- Şadiye (1836), 64 cannon.
- Fethiye (1836), 96 cannon.

==== Battle of Sinop (1853) ====
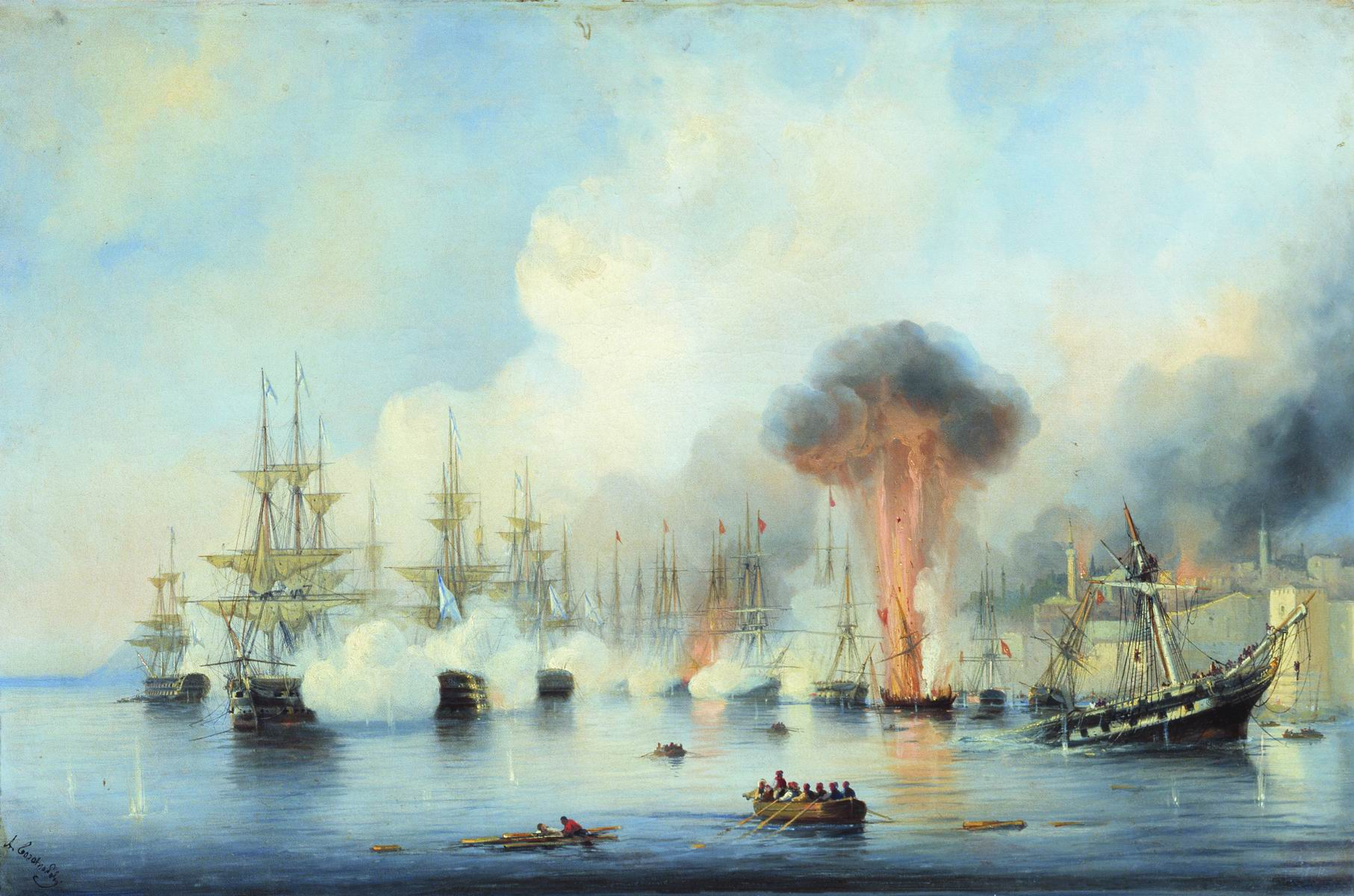
The Battle of Sinop, by Alexey Bogolyubov (1860).

- Avni Illah, 44 cannon frigate, grounded.
- Fazl Illah (ex-Russian Rafail, captured 1828-29), 44 cannon frigate. Burned and grounded.
- Nizamieh, 62 cannon frigate, grounded after losing two masts.
- Nessin Zafer, 60 cannon frigate, grounded after her anchor chain broke.
- Navek Bahri, 58 cannon frigate, exploded.
- Damiat, 56 cannon frigate built in Egypt, grounded.
- Kaid Zafer, 54 cannon frigate, grounded.
- Nejm Fishan, a 24 cannon corvette.
- Feyd Mabud, 24 cannon corvette, grounded.
- Kel Safid, 22 cannon corvette, exploded.

== Regency of Algiers ==
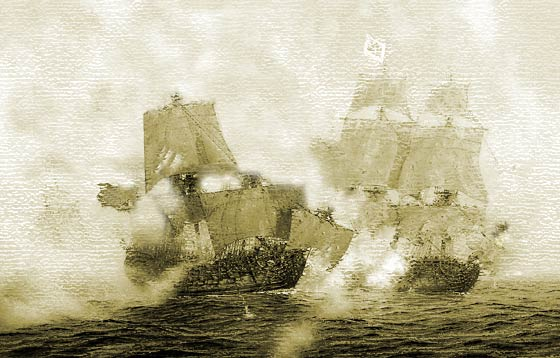
Battle between the Spanish ship of line Dragón and the Algerian ship of line Danzik in 1751.

- ?, 50? cannon, scuttled in battle in 1624.
- ?, 46 cannon, sunk in 1665.
- Marygold, captured by England in 1677, wrecked in 1679.
- ?, captured by England in 1678 and renamed Tiger Prize, scuttled as a breakwater in 1696.
- ?, 42 cannon, captured by England in 1679 and renamed Greyhound.
- Golden Horse, captured by England in 1681 and scuttled in 1688.
- Half Moon, captured by England in 1681 and burnt in 1686.
- Two Lions, captured by England in 1681, sold in 1688.
- Star, 50 cannon, captured by the Papal States in 1695.
- Half Moon, 40 cannon, captured by the Knights of Malta in 1713.
- ?, 56 cannon, sunk in 1714.
- Danzik, 60-gun ship of the line, sunk by the Spanish in the action of 28 November 1751.
- Castillo Nuevo, 60-gun ship of the line, sunk by the Spanish in the Battle of Cape Palos in 1758.
- Caravela, 40-gun frigate, shipwrecked in a storm due to damage after the Battle of Cape Palos in 1758.

== Egypt Eyalet ==
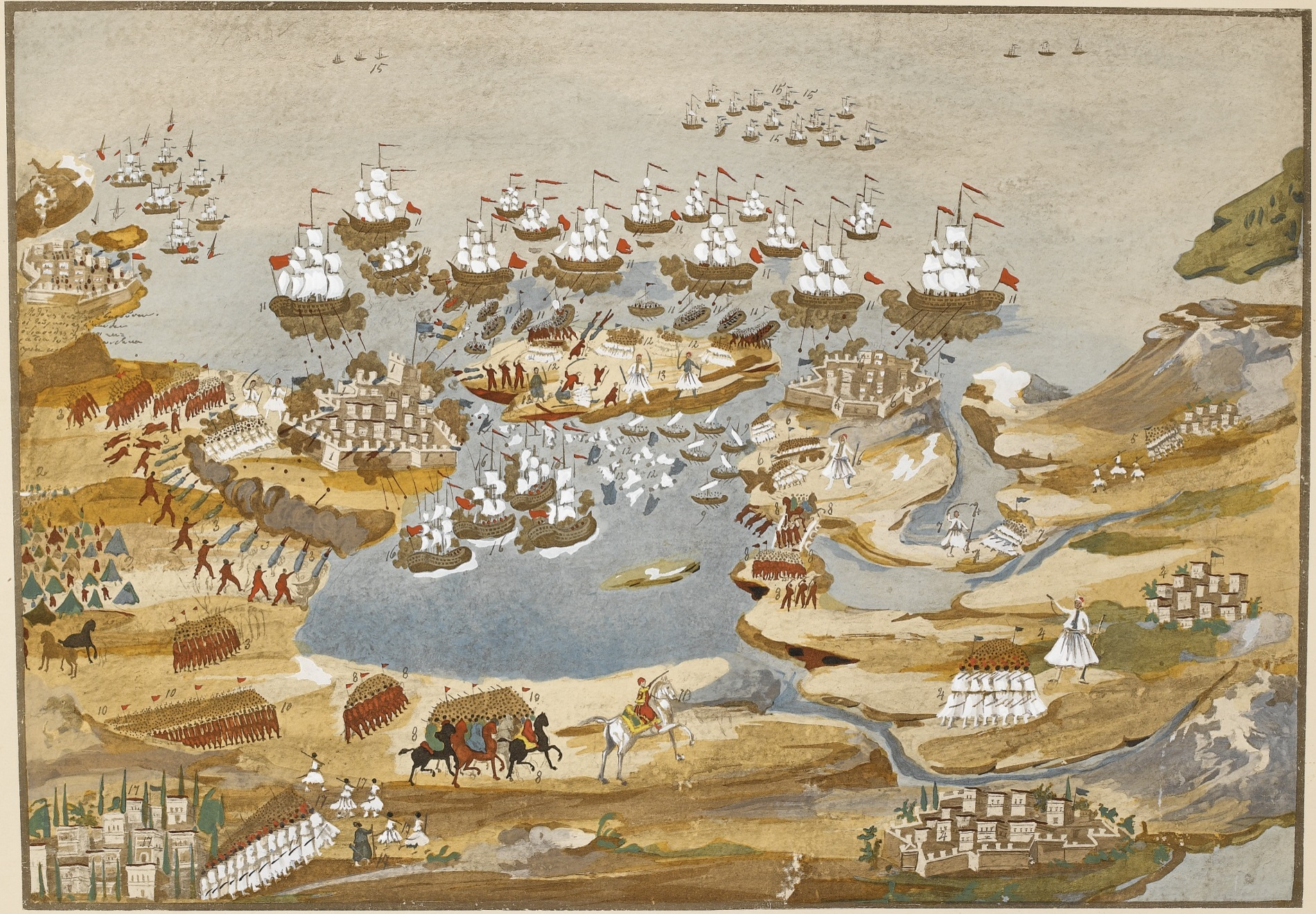
Egyptian ships at the Battle of Sphacteria (1825).

- Mehalet el Kebir class (100 gun):
  - Mahalet-el-Koubra or al-Muhallet al-Kubra, ex-Mohamed Ali, 100 cannon. Built in 1831 in Alexandria, extant as of 1849.
  - Mansourah or al-Mansurah, ex-Ibrahim, 96 cannon. Built in 1831 in Alexandria, extant as of 1849.
  - Iskander a.k.a. Iskandr and al-Iskandariyah, 98 cannon. Built in 1832 in Alexandria, extant as of 1850.
  - Homs or Hims, ex-Rachid, 100 cannon. Built in 1833 in Alexandria, extant as of 1850.
  - Koniah or Alep, ex-Aleppo, 100 cannon. Built in 1837 in Alexandria, possibly extant as of 1863.
  - Fayoum, built in 1838 in Alexandria and extant as of 1863.
  - Benisouef, built in 1838 in Alexandria and extant as of 1863.
- Misr class (136-138 gun):
  - Masr a.k.a. Misr or al-Qahirah, 136 cannon. Built in 1832 in Alexandria, extant as of 1850.
  - Aké, 136 cannon. Built in 1833, in Alexandria, extant as of 1854.
- Beylan class (80+ gun):
  - Beylan, 86 cannon. Built in 1835 in Alexandria, extant as of 1864.
  - Barecham, accidentally burnt during construction in 1838 in Alexandria.
- Aboukir class (58-72 gun):
  - Aboukir or Abu Qur. Built in 1832 in Alexandria, decommissioned before 1850.
- Al Qahirah, 100 cannon. Built in the 19th century.
- Sham, 100 cannon. Also built in the 19th century.

== Tripolitania Eyalet ==
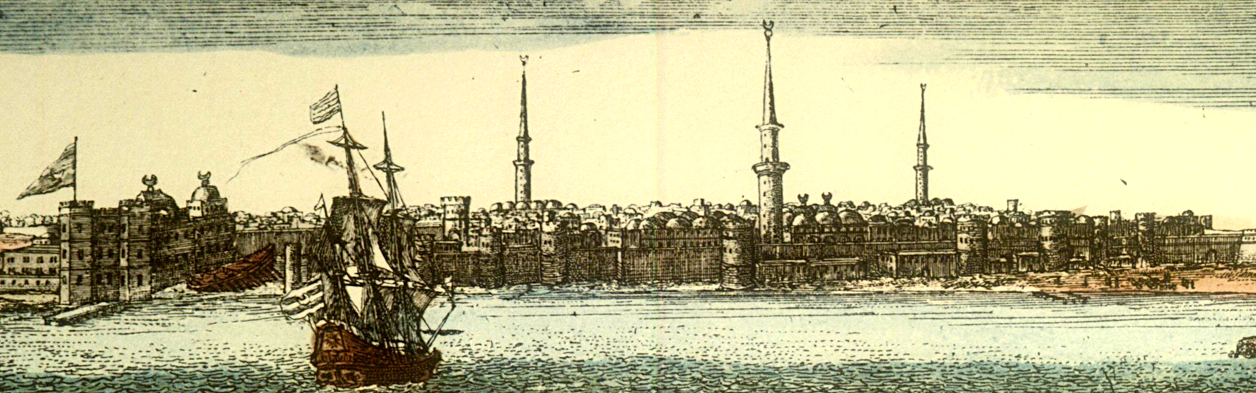
View of Tripoli in 1675, by John Seller.

- White Crowned Eagle, 50 cannon, captured and sunk by the English in 1676.
- Half Moon?, 42 cannon
- Dragon?, 38 cannon
- Sun, 40 cannon
- Flying Horse, 38 cannon
- ?, 56 cannon, burnt in 1709
- ?, 48 cannon, captured by the Knights of Malta in 1723

== Eyalet of Tunis ==
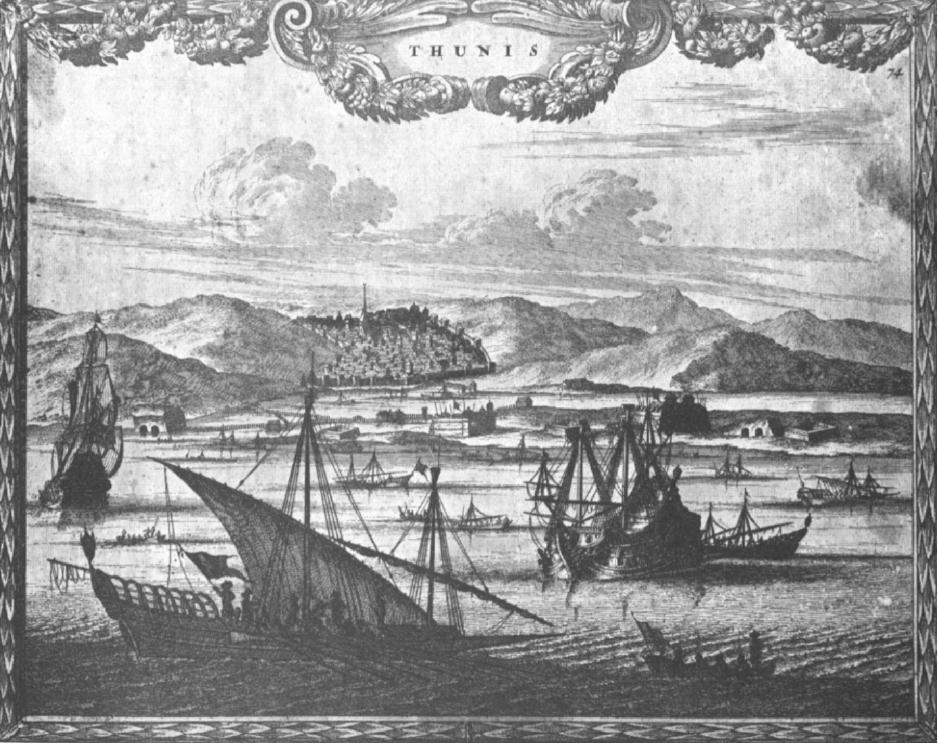
Engraving of Tunis in 1690.

- ?, 40 cannon, captured by Malta in 1628.
- ?, 46 cannon, captured by Malta in 1640.
- Rose of Tunis, 46 cannon, captured by Malta in 1706 and renamed Santa Croce.
- ?, 38 cannon, captured by the French in 1727 but returned to Tunis in the same year.

== Sources ==
- İsmail Hami Danişmend, İzahlı Osmanlı Tarihi Kronolojisi, 4. Cilt, Türkiye Yayınevi, p. 148.
- Candan Badem, The Ottoman Crimean War (1853-1856), Brill, 2010, p. 117.
