= Federal Rideau =

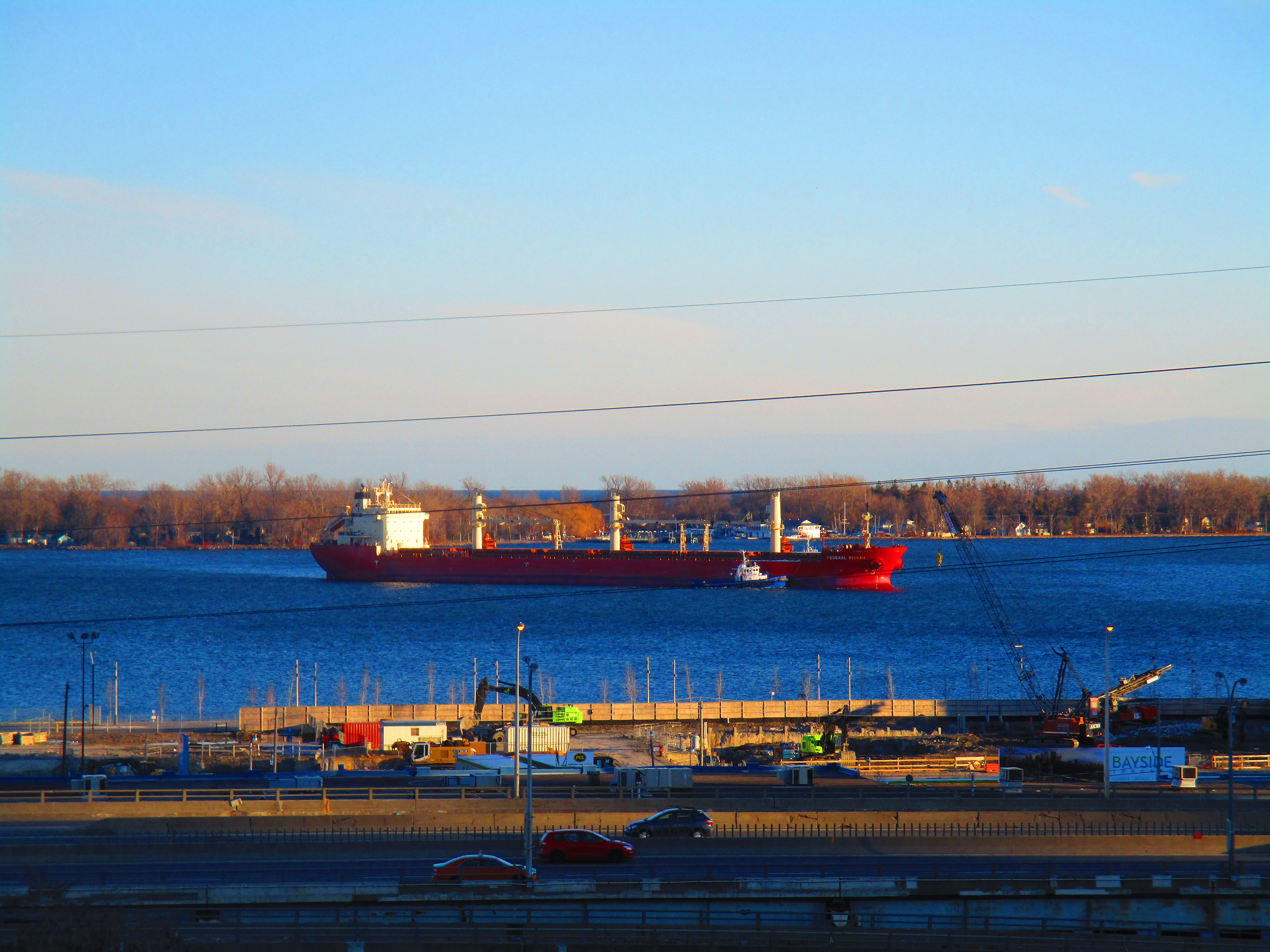
- Tugs guide Federal Rideau to her moorings at the Redpath Sugar Refinery in Toronto

History
- Name: Federal Rideau
- Owner: Fednav
- Port of registry: (Marshall Islands) Majuro
- Builder: Oshima Shipbuilding, Ōshima
- Yard number: 10261
- Laid down: 14 September 1999
- Launched: 27 November 1999
- Completed: 31 January 2000
- Identification: IMO number: 9200445; MMSI number: 538006784
- Status: in service

General characteristics
- Type: Bulk carrier
- Tonnage: 20,659 GT; 36,563 DWT
- Length: 200.0 m (656 ft 2 in) oa; 191.9 m (629 ft 7 in) pp
- Beam: 23.8 m (78 ft 1 in)
- Propulsion: 1 screw; Diesel engine
- Speed: 14 knots (26 km/h; 16 mph)

Federal Rideau is a bulk carrier owned and operated by Fednav. She, and her sister ship, Federal Asahii, were built in Ōshima, Japan, in 2000. The vessel entered service the same year. The vessel has had two incidents in her career, both in 2014.

== Description ==
Federal Rideau is 200.0 metres (656 ft 2 in) long overall and 191.9 metres (629 ft 7 in) between perpendiculars, with a beam of 23.8 metres (78.1 ft). The vessel has a gross tonnage (GT) of 20,659 tons and a deadweight tonnage (DWT) of 36,563 tons. The ship is powered by a diesel engine driving one screw with a maximum speed of 14 knots (26 km/h; 16 mph).

== Service history ==
The ship was constructed by Oshima Shipbuilding at their shipyard at Ōshima, Japan. The vessel's keel was laid down on 14 September 1999 and the bulk carrier was given the yard number 10261. Built the same year as her sister ship Federal Asahii, Federal Rideau was launched on 27 November 1999 and completed 31 January 2000. The ship is registered in the Marshall Islands and is owned and operated by Fednav.

In July 2014 she ran aground in Lake St. Clair, near Peche Island, and required five tugboats to get free. She was carrying 20,000 tons of wheat from Thunder Bay to Montreal. In December 2014 a failure of the Martin Luther King Bridge over the Maumee River blocked her progress in Toledo, Ohio.
