= Umiak I =

Bulk carrier

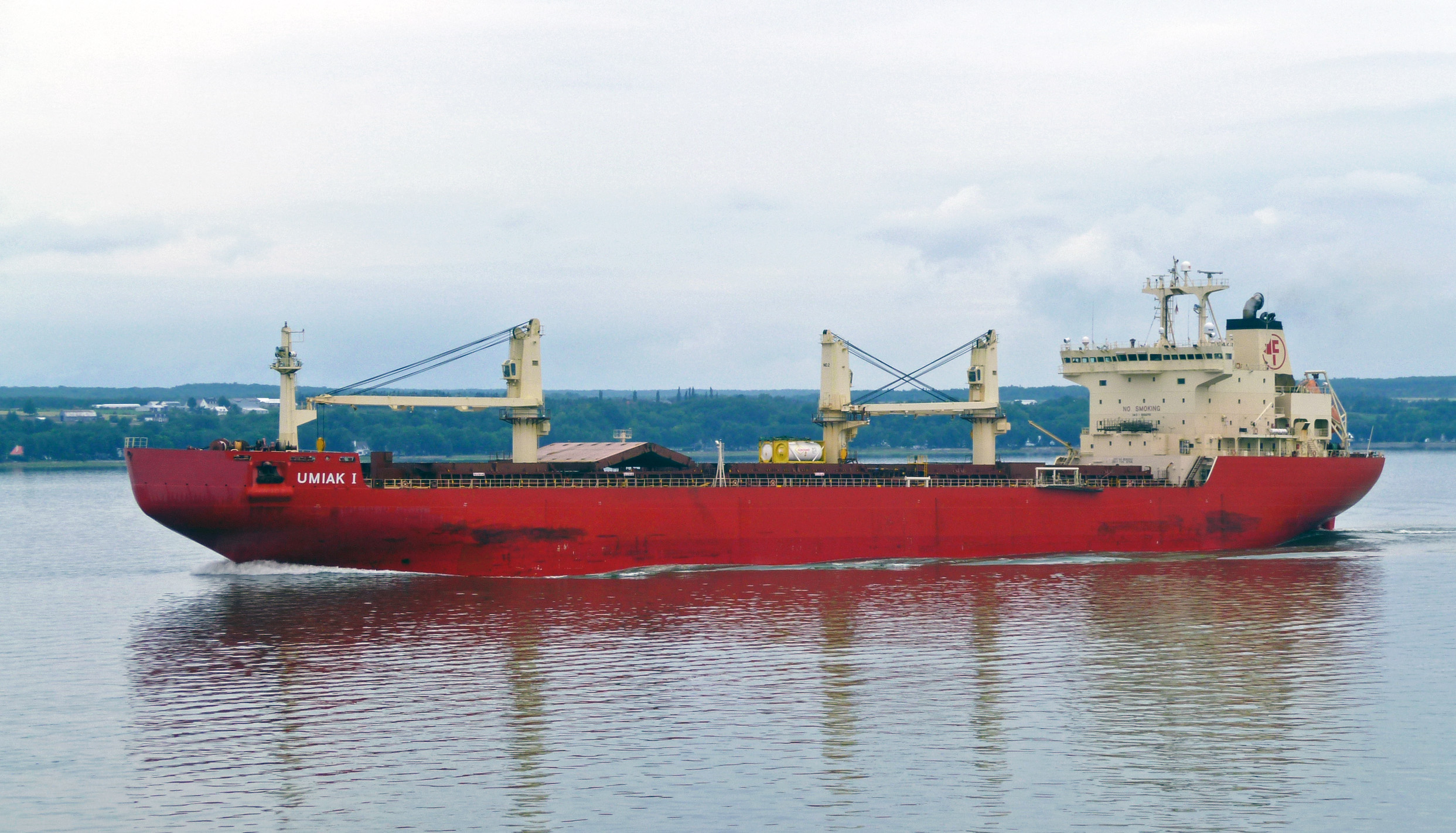
- Umiak I in Quebec on 4 August 2018

History
- Name: Umiak I
- Owner: Fednav Group
- Operator: Canship Ugland Limited
- Port of registry: St. John's, Newfoundland and Labrador, Canada
- Ordered: 27 February 2004
- Builder: Universal Shipbuilding Corporation Maizuru Shipyard (Japan)
- Yard number: 10003
- Laid down: 2 August 2005
- Launched: 14 November 2005
- Completed: 13 April 2006
- In service: 2006–
- Identification: IMO number: 9334715; Call sign: XJAR
- Status: In service

General characteristics
- Type: Bulk carrier
- Tonnage: 22,462 GT; 8,853 NT; 31,992 DWT
- Length: 188.8 m (619 ft)
- Beam: 26.6 m (87 ft)
- Draught: 11.7 m (38 ft)
- Depth: 15.7 m (52 ft)
- Ice class: DNV ICE-15
- Installed power: MAN B&W-Hitachi 7S70ME-C (21,770 kW)
- Propulsion: Single shaft; controllable-pitch propeller with nozzle
- Speed: 13.5 knots (25.0 km/h; 15.5 mph); 3 knots (5.6 km/h; 3.5 mph) in 1.5-metre (5 ft) ice
- Capacity: Five holds, 40,490 m^{3} (grain)
- Notes: Three cranes (1 × 50 tons; 2 × 30 tons)

Umiak I is a purpose-built ice-strengthened bulk carrier constructed for the Voisey's Bay Nickel Company, a wholly owned subsidiary of Vale, to transport ore from the Voisey's Bay Mine.

According to an article in the April 2006 issue of The Gossan an internal publication of the Voisey's Bay Nickel Company, Umiak I had completed her sea trials in Japan, and her delivery was expected in May 2006. "Umiak is the Inuktitut name for a supply boat or sometimes called a woman's boat, and is a fitting name for a vessel carrying concentrate from Voisey's Bay".

Umiak I makes twelve trips per year, transporting a total of 360,000 tonnes of nickel concentrate, worth $1.5 billion CAD.

Fednav also operated a similar ice-strengthened bulk carrier, Arctic, which shared the load with Umiak I; she was later scrapped in 2021. On 30 October 2012, Fednav announced it had ordered a third icebreaking cargo vessel from Universal Shipbuilding Corporation's Tsu shipyard in Japan. The Polar Class 4 vessel, Nunavik, entered service in January 2014. Another similar vessel, Arvik I, was built in 2021.

== Design ==
Umiak I is 188.8 metres (619 ft) long and has a beam of 26.6 metres (87 ft). Fully laden, she draws 11.7 metres (38 ft) of water and has a deadweight tonnage of 31,992 tons. Designed for operations in Arctic ice-infested waters and assigned ice class ICE-15 by Det Norske Veritas, she has a sloping icebreaker bow and a hull strengthened for independent operations in ice up to 1.5 metres (5 ft) thick without icebreaker escort.

A bulk carrier designed to carry nickel concentrate, Umiak I has five holds with a combined grain capacity of 40,490 cubic metres. She is geared with three cranes, one 50-ton crane serving holds 1 and 2, and two 30-ton cranes serving holds 3, 4 and 5. In addition to bulk cargo, she can also carry re-supply cargoes for the production operations, including fuel oil.

Umiak I is powered by a seven-cylinder MAN B&W-Hitachi 7S70ME-C low-speed two-stroke diesel engine producing 21,770 kW (29,190 hp). The main engine is coupled directly to a ducted controllable-pitch propeller. The variable-pitch propeller allows backing and ramming in heavy ice conditions without reversing the engine, and the nozzle protects it from ice impacts and provides additional thrust. In open water, Umiak I can achieve a speed of 13.5 knots (25.0 km/h; 15.5 mph) with only 35% engine load. In 1.5-metre (5 ft) ice, she can maintain a speed of 3 knots (5.6 km/h; 3.5 mph) with the aid of a water deluge system in the bow. For onboard electricity generator, she is fitted with three six-cylinder STX-built MAN 6L23/30H generating sets.

== Media ==
Umiak I was featured in an hour-long documentary in season 5 of Mighty Ships.
