= I7 =

I7, i7, or I-7 may refer to:

- Intel Core i7, a brand of Intel processors
- BMW i7, an electric luxury sedan
- Inline-seven engine or straight-seven engine
- Interstate 7, a proposed Interstate highway in California
- I^{7}, in music tonic, the secondary supertonic chord of IV
- i7, the former web portal for Seven Network, replaced by Yahoo7
- Japanese submarine I-7, an Imperial Japanese Navy submarine launched in 1935 and wrecked in 1943
- Paramount Airways' IATA code

== See also ==
- 7I (disambiguation)
