= Nunavik (disambiguation) =

Nunavik is the northern third of the province of Quebec, Canada.

Nunavik may also refer to:

- Nunavik Peninsula, a large peninsula in northwestern Greenland
- Nunavik (ship), an icebreaking bulk carrier

== See also ==
- Nunavut, a territory of Canada
- Nunatsiavut, an autonomous area in Newfoundland and Labrador, Canada
- Abitibi—Baie-James—Nunavik—Eeyou, a Quebec electoral district
