= Port of Cleveland =

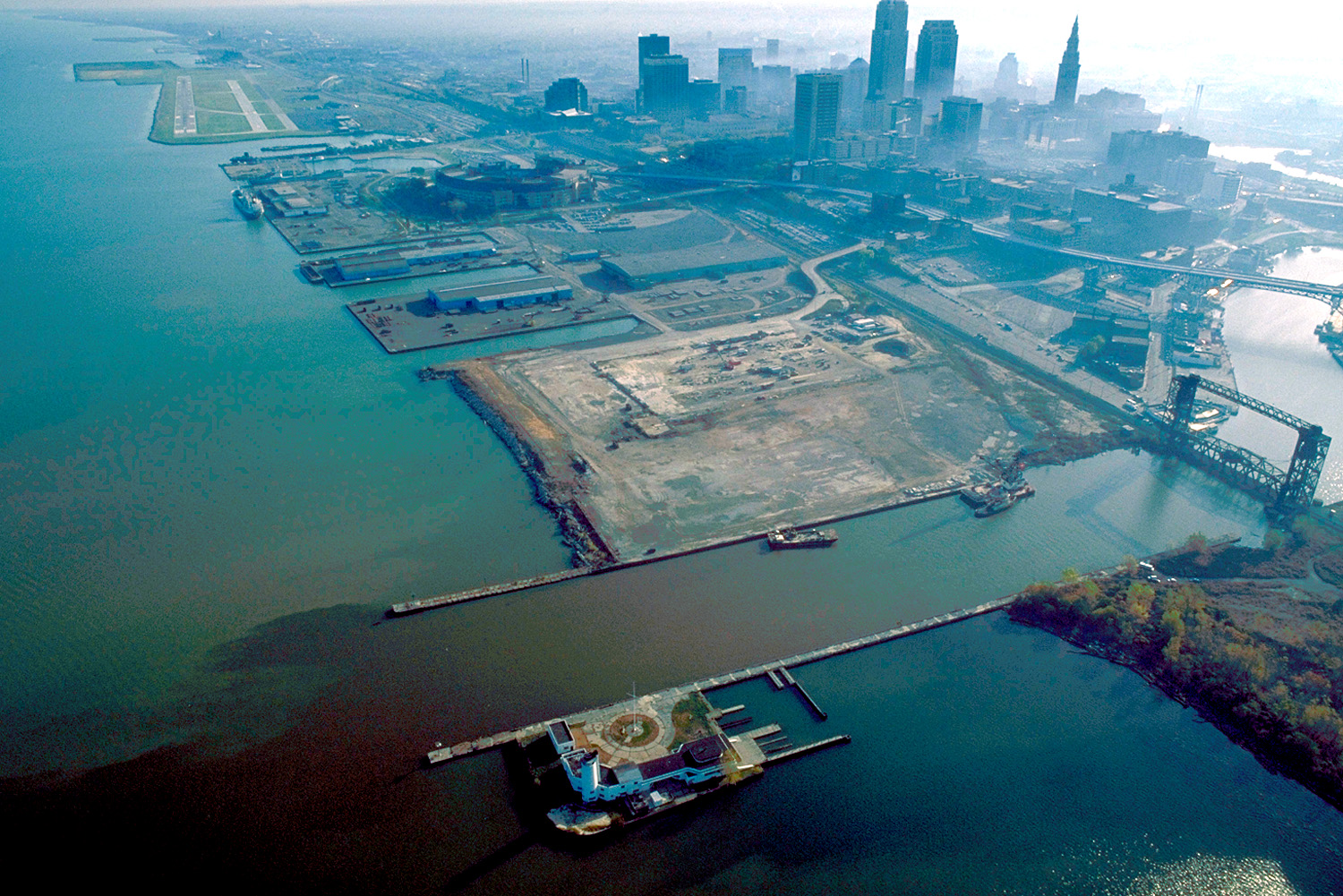
- Oblique aerial view of Port of Cleveland, Cuyahoga County, Ohio.
- Interactive map of Port of Cleveland

Location
- Country: United States
- Location: Cleveland, Ohio, Cuyahoga River, Lake Erie, Great Lakes
- Coordinates: 41°31′10″N 81°41′19″W
- UN/LOCODE: US CLE

Details
- Opened: 1825
- Owned by: Cleveland-Cuyahoga County Port Authority
- Size: 144 sq mi (370 km^{2})
- Draft depth: 27 ft (8.2 m)
- CEO and President: Jeff Epstein

Statistics
- Vessel arrivals: 959 (2006)
- Annual cargo tonnage: 15,186,819 (2006)
- Value of cargo: $7 billion
- Website www.portofcleveland.com

The Port of Cleveland is a bulk freight and container shipping port at the mouth of the Cuyahoga River on Lake Erie in Cleveland, Ohio, United States. It is the third-largest port in the Great Lakes and the fourth-largest Great Lakes port by annual tonnage. Over 23,000 jobs and $7.07 billion in annual economic activity are tied to the roughly 13 million tons of cargo that move through Cleveland Harbor each year.

The Port of Cleveland is the only container port on the Great Lakes, with bi-weekly service between Cleveland and Antwerp on a service called the Cleveland-Europe Express.

In October 2025, Jeff Epstein took over as CEO. Epstein was previously Cleveland's chief of integrated development.

== Cargo ==
The Port of Cleveland handles the bulk of raw material shipments for regional manufacturing, as well as exporting some local resources (salt mined from under Lake Erie, materials quarried locally, Ohio farm surpluses).

=== Primary Cargoes ===
- Inbound: Steel, heavy machinery, iron ore, limestone, liquid/dry bulk items, and shipping containers
- Outbound: Steel, iron ore, limestone, cement, salt, power generators, wind turbines, capital equipment, and heavy machinery

=== Overall Annual Tonnage ===
- Generating $3.5 billion per year in trade.
- Annual cargo handling averages between 11 million to 16 million tons
- Dry Bulk (loose materials such as limestone, iron ore and grain): 12 million tons
- Break Bulk (packaged materials): 500,000 tons
- about 1,000 vessel visits,

Tonnage for Port of Cleveland
Year	U.S. Rank	Total Tons	Domestic Tons	Foreign Total Tons	Foreign Imports Tons	Foreign Exports Tons	Reference
2006	44	15,186,819	11,467,131	3,719,688	3,598,998	120,690	
2005	47	13,640,966	10,225,360	3,415,606	3,137,262	278,344	
2004	44	15,774,611	11,855,282	3,919,329	3,567,866	351,463	
2003	47	12,620,794	9,508,542	3,112,252	2,708,093	404,159	
2002	48	11,411,765	9,083,965	2,327,800	2,270,800	57,000	
2001	48	11,937,815	9,203,587	2,734,228	2,430,028	304,200	
2000	44	14,390,802	11,914,437	2,476,365	2,262,104	214,261	

Break- and Dry- Bulk Tonnage for Port of Cleveland
Year	Dry Bulk short Tons	Break Bulk short Tons
2000	1,028,500	949,552
1999	934,306	721,369
1998	1,239,551	1,182,792
1997	1,521,729	1,045,377
1996	1,809,000	1,158,056
1995	1,531,985	779,314
1994	1,899,989	869,669
1993	2,069,184	764,743
1992	2,700,842	435,286
1991	2,852,675	913,670
1990	3,038,535	773,922

== Connections ==
=== Rail ===
Connections to:
(2) Class I railroads:

- CSX Transportation
- Norfolk Southern Railway

and several regional/short-line railroads:

- Cleveland Terminal and Valley Railway
- ISG Cleveland Works Railway Company
- Newburgh and South Shore Railroad
- R. J. Corman Railroad Cleveland Line
- Wheeling and Lake Erie Railway

=== Truck ===
Port has truck access to four major Interstate highways:

- I-71, South to: Strongsville, Seville, Columbus and Cincinnati
- I-77, South to: Akron, Canton, Richfield, Cambridge, Marietta; Beckley, West Virginia and Columbia, South Carolina
- I-80/Ohio Turnpike,

*East to: Streetsboro, Youngstown; and Pennsylvania Turnpike
*West to: North Ridgeville, Lorain, Toledo; and Indiana Toll Road

- I-90,

*East to: Euclid, Ohio, Willoughby; Erie, Pennsylvania and Buffalo, New York
*West to: Westlake, Elyria, Toledo; and South Bend, Indiana

as well as local bypasses/connectors:

- I-271, I-480, and I-490;

and Ohio State Routes, such as:

- Ohio State Route 2

*East to: Euclid and Painesville
*West to: Rocky River and Elyria

== Facilities ==
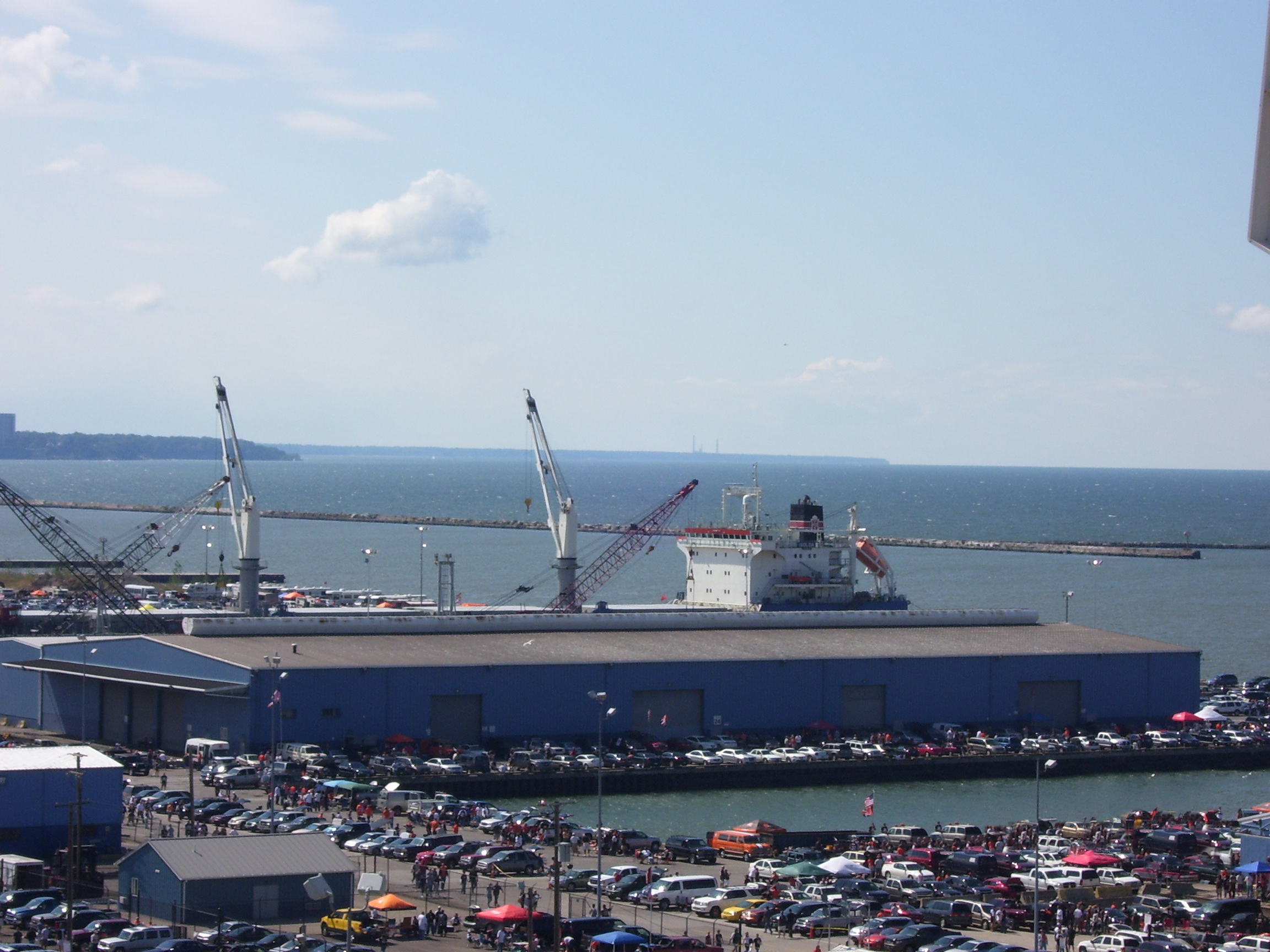
A warehouse at the Port of Cleveland.

Eight international cargo berths and docks consist of 110 acres (0.45 km^{2}) of land alongside Lake Erie on the east side of the Cuyahoga River, while the Cleveland Bulk Terminal transshipment facility occupies 44 acres (0.18 km^{2}) just west of the river.

=== Geography ===
The Port of Cleveland spans across the Cleveland Harbor on Lake Erie and up the Cuyahoga River to the turning basin.

Port of Cleveland
Name	USGS GNIS Feature ID # and Link	Coordinates	Elevation
Cleveland Harbor	1072326	41°31′10″N 81°41′19″W	571 feet (174 m)
Cuyahoga River	1072205	41°30′13″N 81°42′44″W	571 feet (174 m)
Turning Basin	1047220	41°28′36″N 81°40′20″W	581 feet (177 m)

=== Maritime ===
Docks are maintained at a full Great Lakes seaway depth, which is 27 feet (8.2 m).

==== Operators ====
Four terminal operators use port facilities:

- Carmeuse NA
- Essroc (Italcementi)
- Kenmore Construction
- Fednav

==== Cleveland Bulk Terminal ====
Cleveland Bulk Terminal (CBT), located at 5500 Whiskey Island Drive, on Whiskey Island, is port-owned but operated by Carmeuse NA which handles iron ore transfers. The lakefront facility can accommodate 1,000 feet (300 m) vessels used to discharge and reload rail cars. The automated CBT iron ore loader system on Whiskey Island on the west side of the Cuyahoga River loads materials onto boats from the terminal and transfers materials at a rate of 5,200 tons per hour. Limited handling of materials greatly improves the quality of pellets delivered to the mill.
The ore loader operation benefits three Cleveland companies:

- Cleveland-Cliffs — supplier of iron ore pellets, uses iron ore pellets at its steel mills, and coke plants
- Carmeuse NA — CBT operator and materials transporter

==== Terminals ====
These facilities are:

- Nine berths and docks in either open dock or two-berth facilities
- Capacity for lifting up to 150 net tons
- Direct rail access and warehousing ability
- Over 6,500 feet (2,000 m) of linear dock space,
- 420,000 square feet (39,000 m^{2}) of warehouse space and
- 12 acres (0.049 km^{2}) of open storage for general cargo operations.

Port of Cleveland Terminals
Dock	Coordinates	Berth Length	Warehouse Storage	Facilities	Tenants
20	41°30′6.91″N 81°42′35.70″W	1,200 feet (370 m)		dry bulk, outside storage, cement	Essroc (Italcementi Group) and Kenmore Construction
22	41°30′14.95″N 81°42′27.41″W	760 feet (230 m)			Federal Marine Terminals, Inc.
24	24: 41°30′17.80″N 81°42′19.25″W; A: 41°30′12.01″N 81°42′13.80″W	1,900 feet (580 m)	24: 79,000 square feet (7,300 m^{2}); A: 144,000 square feet (13,400 m^{2})	30-ton overhead cranes	Federal Marine Terminals, Inc.
26	41°30′22.44″N 81°42′14.39″W	1,677 feet (511 m)	26: 76,000 square feet (7,100 m^{2})		Federal Marine Terminals, Inc.
28	41°30′23.81″N 81°42′10.22″W	1,243 feet (379 m)		Buckeye Booster: heavy 150-ton capacity lift crane	Federal Marine Terminals, Inc.
30	41°30′30.55″N 81°42′3.23″W	500 feet (150 m)	54,000 square feet (5,000 m^{2})		Federal Marine Terminals, Inc.
32	41°30′32.65″N 81°41′59.53″W				City of Cleveland, Ohio used for non-Maritime development including the new Lake Shore Electric Railway interurban museum (since 2006).
CBT	41°29′50.24″N 81°43′16.73″W	1,850 feet (560 m)		Outside storage: 46 acres (2,000,000 ft^{2})	Carmeuse NA
Totals		9,130 feet (2,780 m)	353,000 square feet (32,800 m^{2})		

=== Foreign Trade Zones ===
Cleveland-Cuyahoga County Port Authority, Grantee #40, operates-owns several General Purpose Zone Foreign Trade Zones in Cuyahoga County, Ashtabula County and Lorain County.

==== Port of Cleveland ====
Port of Cleveland complex located on Lake Erie at the mouth of the Cuyahoga River includes five general cargo facilities operated by port-approved stevedoring contractors.

==== Tow Path Valley Business Park ====
Tow Path Valley Business Park is located on both sides of the east and west bank of the Cuyahoga River bordered by Jennings Road on the south, Upper Campbell Road on the east, I-490/I-77/Dille Road on the north and West 14th Street to the west.

== See also ==
- List of North American ports
- List of ports in the United States

== Notes ==
A: Warehouse A has heated storage; and inside rail loading
B: Break Bulk (packaged materials): 500,000 tons
C: Cleveland-Cuyahoga County Port Authority operates-owns several General Purpose Zone Foreign Trade Zones NOT included in the cited Port of Cleveland dock-terminal acreage.
D: Dry Bulk (loose materials such as limestone and grain): 12 million tons
E: Port of Duluth, Minnesota-Superior, Wisconsin, and Port of Chicago, and Port of Detroit, Michigan are Great Lakes ports ranked higher than Cleveland, Ohio by annual tonnage.
F: Notes:
G: Dock and Warehouse coordinates manually plotted in Google Earth from map in
