= Wendy Park =

Wendy Park may refer to:

- Wendy Park, a character in the American stop-motion-animated television series Glenn Martin, DDS
- Wendy Park, a public park at Whiskey Island in Cleveland, Ohio
