= Hulett =

Ore unloader used in the Great Lakes of North America

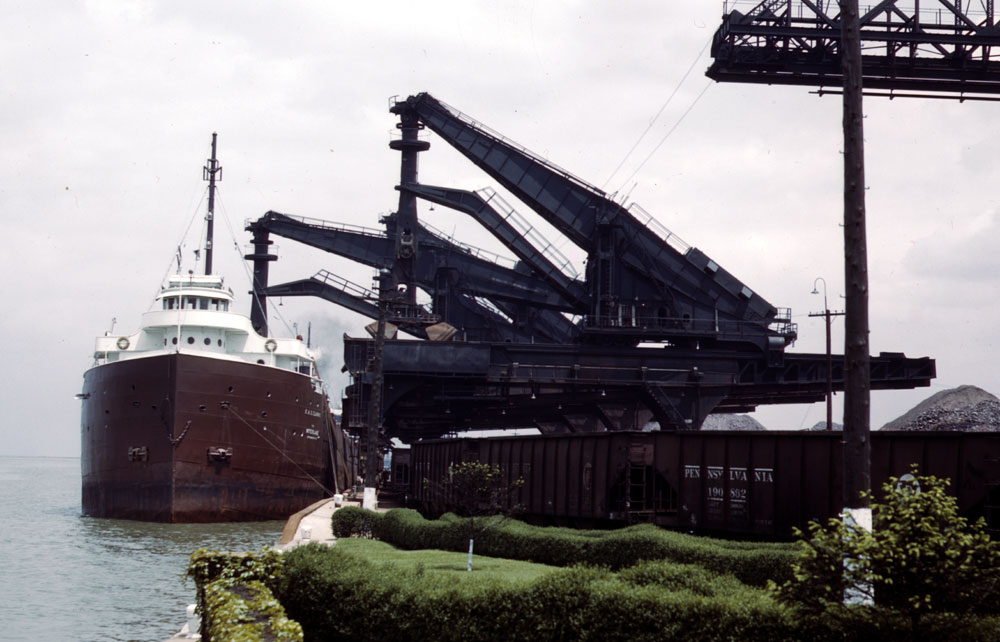
Huletts at the Pennsylvania Railroad ore docks at Cleveland. The nearest Hulett is discharging into the hopper, while the next is lowering its bucket into the hold.

The Hulett was an ore unloader that was widely used on the Great Lakes of North America. It was unsuited to tidewater ports because it could not adjust for rising and falling tides, although one was used in New York City.

== History ==
The Hulett was invented by George Hulett of Conneaut, Ohio, in the late 19th century; he received a patent for his invention in 1898. The first working machine was built the following year at Conneaut Harbor. It was steam powered, successful, and many more were built along the Great Lakes, especially the southern shore of Lake Erie to unload boats full of taconite from the iron mines near Lake Superior. The first Hulett was capable of unloading 275 tons per hour, with increased capacity possible as cargo holds were redesigned for greater efficiency. John W. Ahlberg converted the Huletts in Conneaut to electricity in the 1920s. Substantial improvements were later made to the design by Samuel T. Wellman.

The Hulett machine revolutionised iron ore shipment on the Great Lakes. Previous methods of unloading lake freighters, involving hoists and buckets and much hand labor, cost approximately 19¢/ton. Early Hulett machines lowered that cost to approximately 6¢/ton. Unloading only took 5 to 10 hours, as opposed to days for previous methods. Lake boat designs changed to accommodate the Hulett unloader, with the cargo holds of freighters constructed after 1904 being redesigned to eliminate stanchions and beams, allowing the Hulett to reach up to 98% of the cargo. Ships also became much larger, doubling in length and quadrupling in capacity.

By 1913, 54 Hulett machines were in service. Two were built at Lake Superior (unloading coal) and five at Gary, Indiana, but the vast majority were along the shores of Lake Erie. The additional unloading capacity they brought helped permit a greater than doubling of the ore traffic in the 1900–1912 period. A total of approximately 75 Huletts were built. One was installed in New York City to unload garbage.

The lake's Huletts were used until about 1992, when self-unloading boats were standard on the American side of the lake. All have since been dismantled. In 1999, only six remained, the group of four at Whiskey Island in Cleveland, the oldest. Another set was used unloading barges of coal in South Chicago until 2002 and were demolished in the spring of 2010.

In spite of the Cleveland machines being on the National Register of Historic Places and designated as a Historic Mechanical Engineering Landmark, they were demolished in 2000 by the Cleveland-Cuyahoga County Port Authority to enable development of the underlying land. The Port Authority disassembled and retained two Huletts, to enable their reconstruction at another site, but the reconstruction never started. In March 2024 the Port Authority initially chose a demolition contractor that intended to reassemble one unloader in nearby Canton, but they chose another contractor later in the month, which expects to salvage the arms and buckets. The last two remaining Huletts were scrapped in June 2024.

== Operation ==
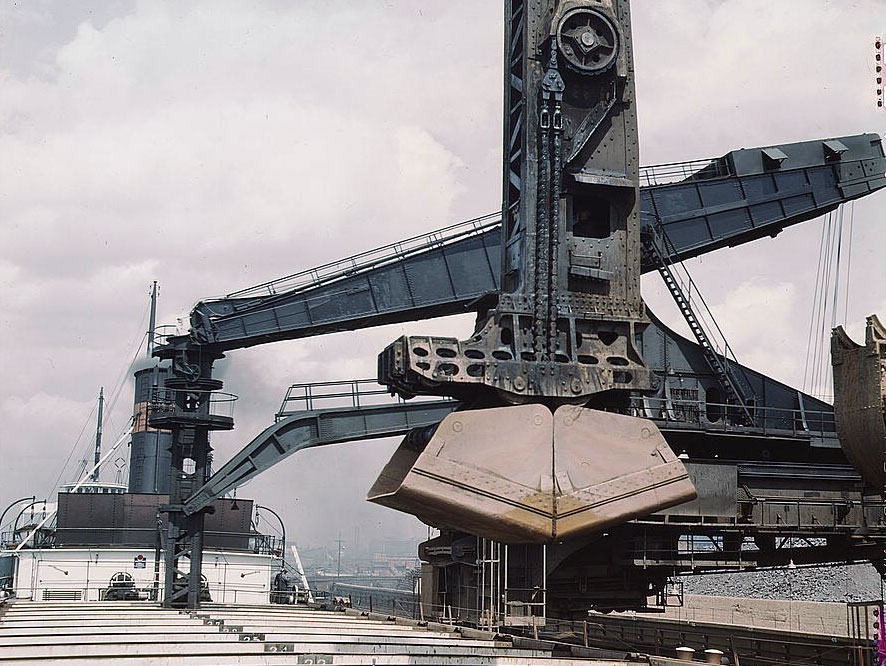
A Hulett's bucket in the foreground, while another scoops ore from the hold. The operator's cab is in the leg, behind the aperture above the bucket and below the circular sprocket.

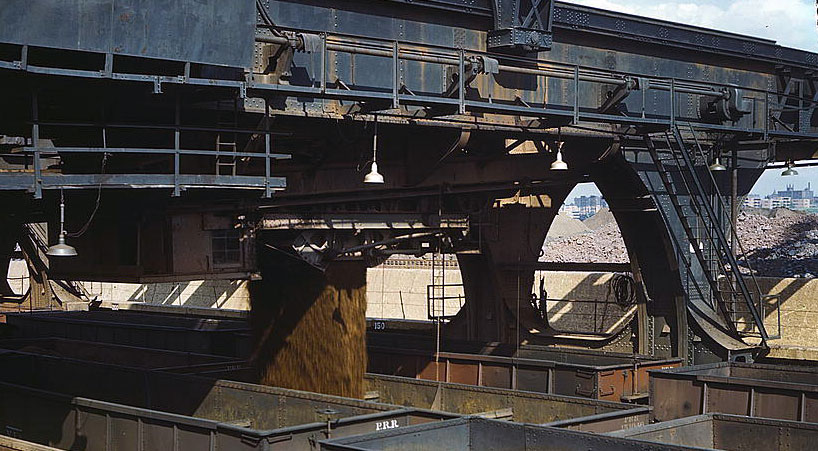
Discharging the travelling hopper's load into a waiting hopper car.

The electrically powered Hulett unloader rode on two parallel tracks along the docks, one near the edge and one further back, ordinarily with four railroad tracks in between. Steel towers, riding on wheeled trucks, supported girders that spanned the railroad tracks.

Along these girders ran a carriage which could move toward or away from the dock face. This in turn carried a large walking beam which could be raised or lowered; at the dock end of this was a vertical column with a large scoop bucket on the end. A parallel beam was mounted halfway down this column to keep the column vertical as it was raised or lowered. The machine's operator, stationed in the vertical beam above the bucket for maximum cargo visibility, could spin the beam at any angle. The scoop bucket was lowered into the ship's hold, closed to capture a quantity (10 tons approx.) of ore, raised, and moved back toward the dock. The workmen who operated the Hulett uploaders were known as Ore Hogs.

To reduce the required motion of the carriage, a moving receiving hopper ran between the main girders. It was moved to the front for the main bucket to discharge its load, and then moved back to dump it into a waiting railroad car, or out onto a cantilever frame at the back to dump the load onto a stockpile.

The Hulett could move along the dock to align with the holds on an ore boat. When the hold was almost empty, the Hulett could not finish the job itself. Workmen entered the hold and shoveled the remaining ore into the Hulett's bucket. In a later development, a wheeled excavator was chained to the Hulett's bucket and lowered into the hold to fill the Hulett.

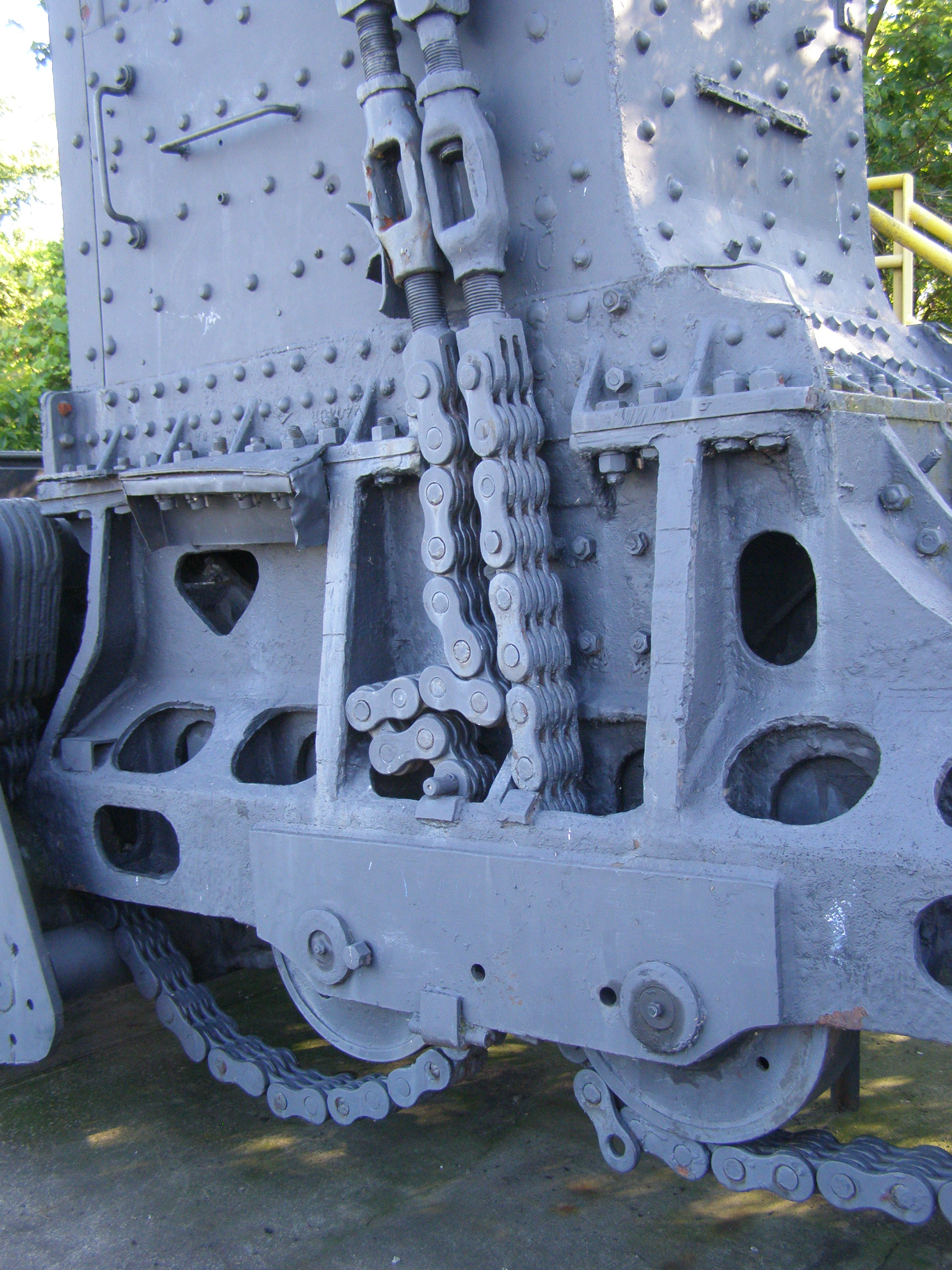
Drive chain

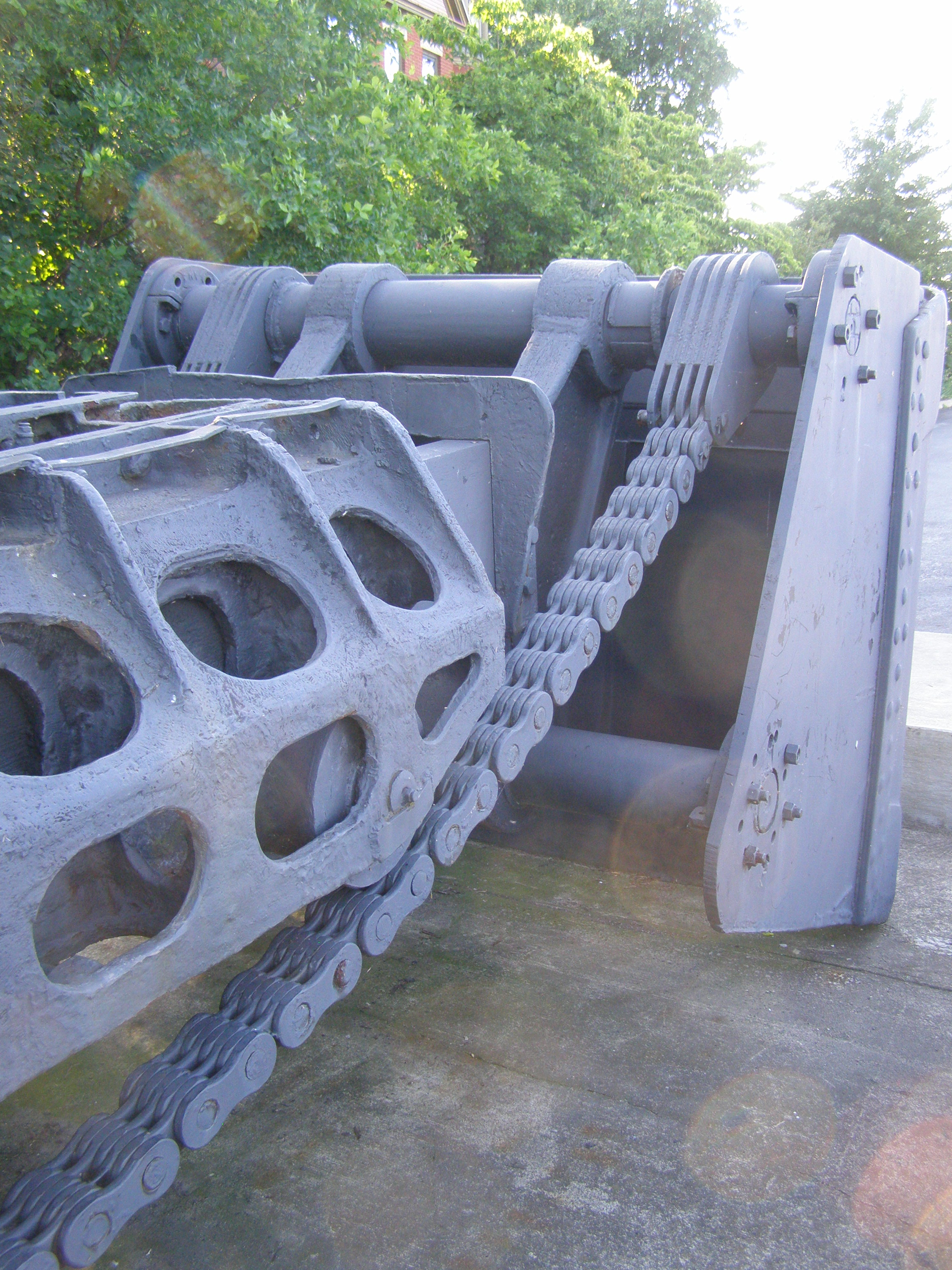
Hulett unloader bucket shaft

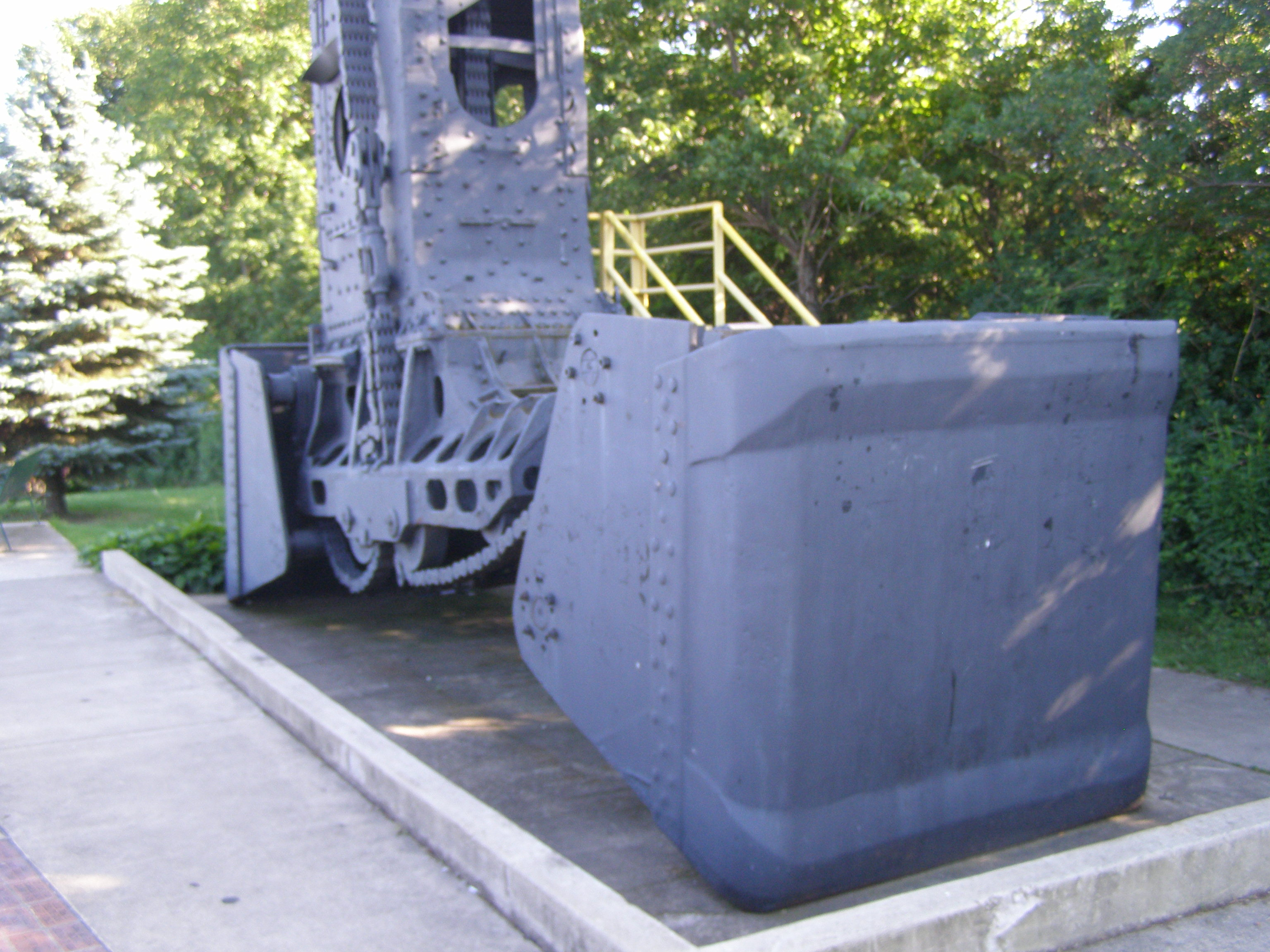
Hulett bucket
