= Peche Island Rear Range Light =

Lighthouse in Michigan, United States

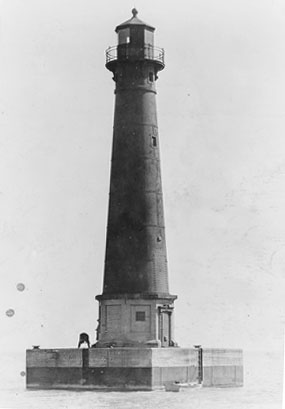
- undated photograph of Peche Island Rear Range Light (USCG)
- Location: Detroit River northeast of Peche Island
- Coordinates: 42.3536°N 82.9172°W

Tower
- Constructed: 1908
- Foundation: Timber crib
- Construction: Steel plates
- Height: 66 feet (20 m)
- Shape: Conical tower

Light
- First lit: 1908
- Deactivated: 1983
- Lens: sixth-order Fresnel lens

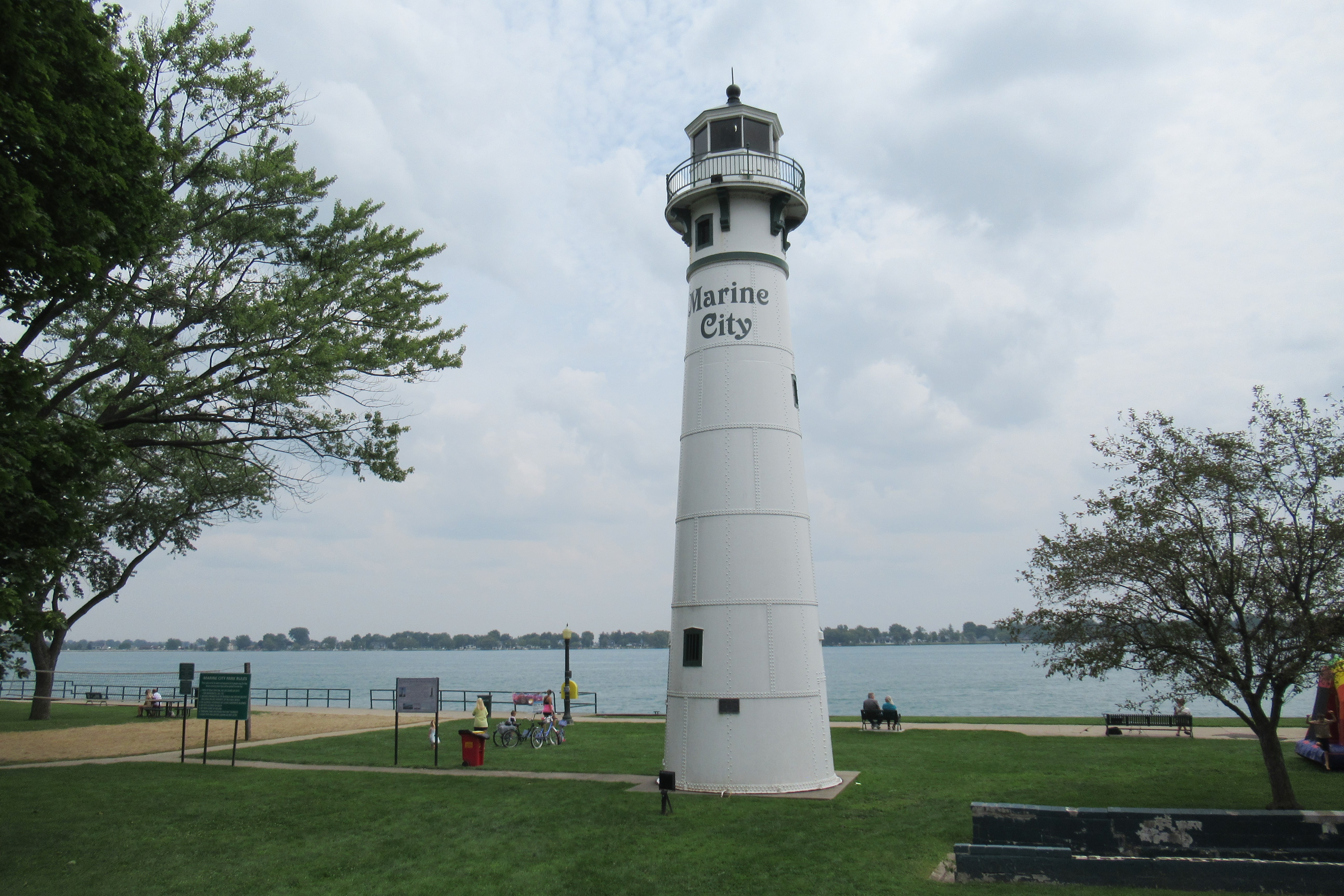
Lighthouse tower at its current location in Marine City, Michigan

The Peche Island Rear Range Light (or Peach Island Rear Range Light) was a historic lighthouse "off Peche Island in the entrance to the Detroit River from Lake St. Clair." Located in American waters just north of the border to Canada it was moved to Marine City, Michigan upon its deactivation.

== History ==
This light was built as part of a pair of range lights to guide ships to the south end of the lake. Erected on a crib in open water, by 1908 it had developed a severe list to one side, and in 1983 it was replaced with a skeletal tower. The old tower was saved, and minus its base, was installed in lighthouse Park in Marine City (42.7164°N 82.4916°W), where it still stands.
