= Nunavik (ship) =

Icebreaking bulk carrier

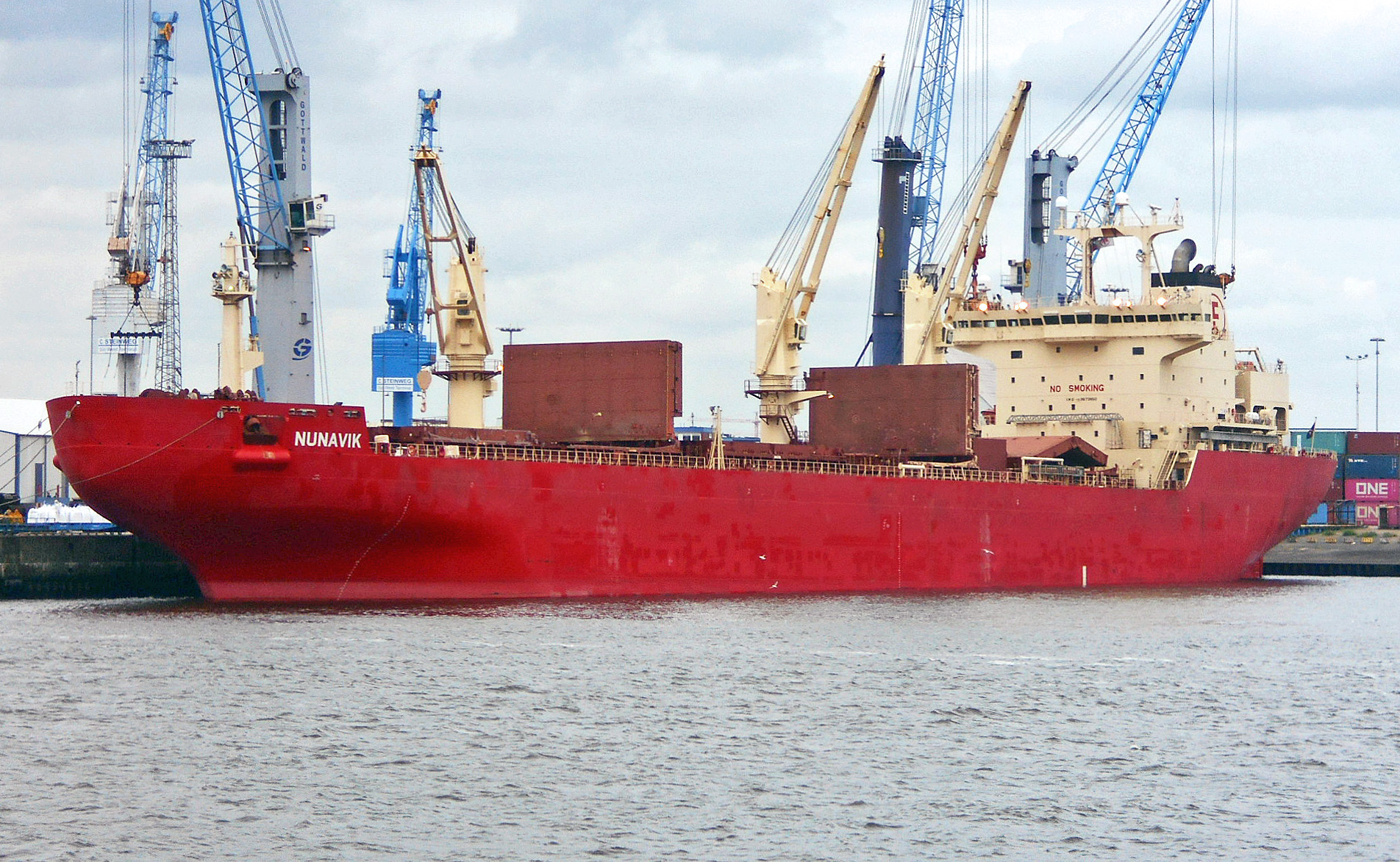
- Nunavik in Hamburg in 2024

History

Canada
- Name: Nunavik
- Namesake: Nunavik
- Owner: Fednav Group
- Operator: Fednav Limited
- Port of registry: Majuro, Marshall Islands
- Ordered: 31 July 2012
- Builder: Japan Marine United Corporation, Tsu, Japan
- Yard number: 204
- Laid down: 19 July 2013
- Launched: 29 September 2013
- Completed: 30 January 2014
- In service: 2014–
- Identification: IMO number: 9673850; Call sign: V7CK9; MMSI number: 538005278
- Status: In service

General characteristics
- Type: Bulk carrier
- Tonnage: 22,622 GT; 6,787 NT; 27,997 DWT
- Length: 188.8 m (619 ft)
- Beam: 26.6 m (87 ft)
- Draft: 10.2 m (33 ft)
- Depth: 15.7 m (52 ft)
- Ice class: IACS Polar Class 4; DNV ICE-15
- Installed power: MAN 7S70ME-C (22,100 kW)
- Propulsion: Single shaft; ducted controllable-pitch propeller
- Speed: 13 knots (24 km/h; 15 mph); 3 knots (5.6 km/h; 3.5 mph) in 1.5 m (4.9 ft) ice
- Crew: 20

Nunavik is an icebreaking bulk carrier owned and operated by the Canadian shipping company Fednav. She is used to transport copper and nickel from the Nunavik Nickel Project, making 7–8 round trips per year.

Nunavik is a sister ship to the 2006-built Umiak I. In April 2018, Fednav ordered a third similar vessel, Arvik I, which was delivered in April 2021.

== Construction ==
In October 2012, Fednav announced that it had signed a contract with Japan Marine United Corporation for the construction of a new ice-strengthened bulk carrier at the Tsu shipyard in Tsu, Japan. Previously, the company already operated two similar vessels with independent icebreaking capability: 1978-built Arctic and 2006-built Umiak I.

The keel of the new vessel was launched at the Japanese shipyard on 19 July 2013 and she was launched only two months later on 29 September. Initially set for delivery in December 2013, the new vessel, Nunavik, was completed on 30 January 2014. She is named after Nunavik, the area compromising the northern third of the province of Quebec, Canada.

Several commenters have noted that while it took only couple of years to build Nunavik in Japan, the design and construction of the new polar icebreakers CCGS Arpatuuq and CCGS Imnaryuaq for the Canadian Coast Guard on a Canadian shipyards will eventually take more than a decade.

== Operational career ==
In 2014, Nunavik became the first cargo ship to make an unescorted voyage through the Northwest Passage. The vessel left Deception Bay, Canada, on 19 September and passed Point Barrow, Alaska, on 30 September. After clearing the Bering Strait, the vessel headed to Bayuquan, China, with a cargo of nickel ore. According to Fednav, the voyage reduced greenhouse gas emissions by 1,300 tonnes when compared to a similar voyage through the Panama Canal. The Northwest Passage route is forty percent shorter than the Panama Canal route.

In 2017, Baffinland, the operators of a massive new open-pit iron-ore mine, in northern Baffin Island, planned to charter the Nunavik to carry supplies, through mid-winter ice, to its port in Milne Inlet. This mid-winter shipment would have included additional massive 200 tonne dump trucks, so they could be ready for the beginning of operations, in the spring. However, in February 2017, the Nunavut Impact Review Board declined to approve the shipment, due to the impact of the voyage on sea mammals Inuit rely on for food, and because it would interfere with local people traveling across the ice.

In 2018, Nunavik was chartered by Ironbark Zinc for a test voyage to prove the shipping route feasible for its Citronen project in Northern Greenland.

== Design ==
Nunavik is 188.8 metres (619 ft) long and has a beam of 26.6 metres (87 ft). Fully laden, she draws 10.2 metres (33 ft) of water and has a deadweight tonnage of 27.997 tons. She is strengthened for navigation in ice according to the International Association of Classification Societies (IACS) Polar Class 4, which allows year-round operation in thick first-year ice which may include old ice inclusions. Furthermore, she fulfills the requirements for ice class ICE-15 by Det Norske Veritas.

A handysize bulk carrier designed to carry nickel concentrate, Nunavik has five holds with a combined grain capacity of 30,221 cubic metres. She is geared with three electro-hydraulic cranes, two with a lifting capacity of 30 tons and one capable of lifting 50 tons. On the return voyage, the vessel will transport equipment and fuel to the mine. Nunavik is also the first Canadian-owned vessel to be fitted with a ballast water treatment system.

The icebreaking bulk carrier is powered by a single seven-cylinder MAN 7S70ME-C low-speed two-stroke crosshead diesel engine which produces 22,100 kW (29,600 hp). In order to reduce the environmental impact, the main engine fulfills the International Maritime Organization (IMO) Tier II requirements for nitrogen oxide emissions. The main is coupled directly to a ducted controllable-pitch propeller manufactured by Rolls-Royce. At full power, Nunavik is able to maintain a continuous speed of 3 knots (5.6 km/h; 3.5 mph) in 1.5-metre (5 ft) ice. In open water, she only needs about one third of the power to reach a service speed of 13 knots (24 km/h; 15 mph). For onboard power generation, Nunavik has three MAN 6L23/30H diesel generating sets.
