= Ed Hauser =

Ed "Citizen" Hauser (April 29, 1961 – November 14, 2008) was a citizen activist in the Cleveland, Ohio, area.

== Biography ==
=== Early life and education ===
Hauser was the fourth of five children born to Walter and the late Theresia Hauser. He graduated from Maple Heights High School in 1979 and Cleveland State University in 1990.

An electrical engineer by training, Hauser was laid off by LTV Steel on December 10, 2001, along with all his co-workers. As an LTV employee, he routinely published articles to educate the public about the Whiskey Island. Thousands of dollars of his money was spent to save Whiskey Island. His appreciation for Lake Erie and the Cuyahoga River led him to fight for the protection of Whiskey Island, the scenic spit of shoreline where the Cuyahoga River meets Lake Erie.

=== Career ===
Hauser championed the preservation of natural landmarks and public access to these resources. As the head of Friends of Whiskey Island, Hauser fought to protect the last piece of natural shoreline in Cleveland. Hauser collected signatures for petitions, represented the public interest at hundreds of commission meetings and other events. He spent his personal funds, including from his retirement plan, as part of a campaign from 1998 to 2005 to preserve 20 acres (81,000 m^{2}) of Whiskey Island as a park while blocking the expansion plans of the Cleveland-Cuyahoga County Port Authority.

In addition to protecting Whiskey Island, Hauser also served as a citizen watchdog on Port Authority activities, championed a steel museum in Steelyard Commons, was vocal about Cleveland's lakefront plans and petitioned the lack of public referendum for the Cuyahoga County Medical Mart tax.

=== Death and afterward ===
Ed Hauser died on November 14, 2008, from heart failure.
