= 7I =

7I or 7-I can refer to:

- IATA code for Insel Air
- Seven & I Holdings Co., Japanese holding company for 7-Eleven
- Minolta DiMAGE 7i, a digital bridge camera by Minolta

== See also ==
- I7 (disambiguation)
