= Whiskey Island mine =

Salt mine owned by Cargill

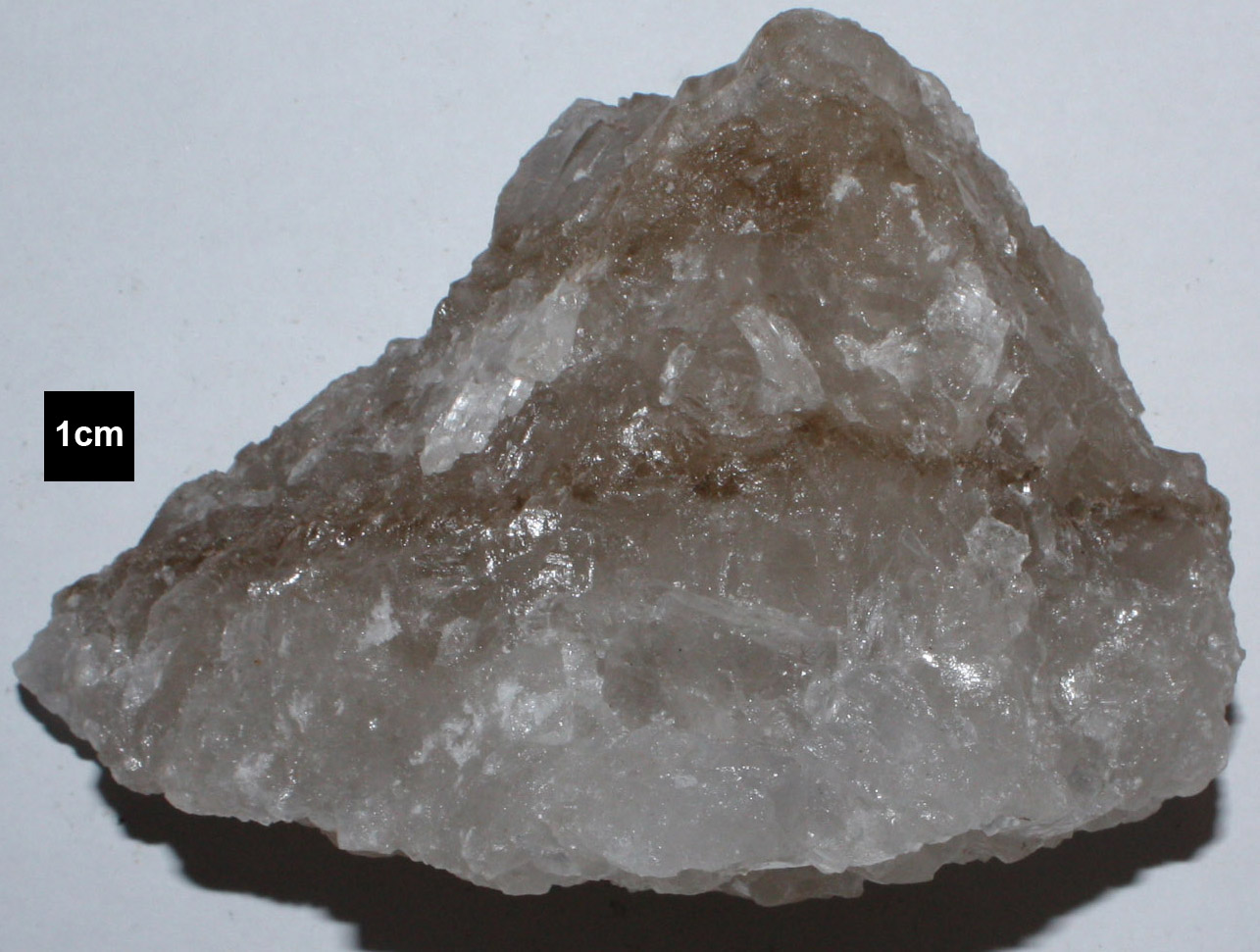
- A piece of halite (rock salt) from the mine

- Location within Ohio
- Location: Whiskey Island, Cleveland,Ohio,United States; 41.494°N 81.718°W
- Products: Salt
- Type: Underground
- Opened: 1962
- Company: Cargill Deicing Technology
- Acquired: 1997

The Whiskey Island mine is a salt mine in downtown Cleveland, Ohio owned by Cargill Deicing Technology. It is one of the largest salt mines in the world and one of two in the Cleveland area, the other being Morton Salt's Fairport Harbor mine to the east. It is also one of three mines in the United States owned by Cargill.

== Description ==
=== Layout ===
The mine taps under Lake Erie into the F_{1} unit of the Salina Formation, which is more than 70 feet (21 m) high in the area. According to mine manager Bob Supko, it is unusual for a salt mine to be located in an urban area (downtown Cleveland), but it keeps supply close to Cargill's business. The location is leased from the State of Ohio, and royalties are paid to the state and the City of Cleveland per amount of salt mined.

Access to the mine is on the shore of Lake Erie on Whiskey Island, where the above-ground facilities are located. The mine dives through limestone to a depth of 1,793 feet (547 m), a four-minute trip by elevator, before expanding horizontally under the lake, which is only 56 feet (17 m) deep here. The mine has grown significantly over the years, from 4 square miles (10 km^{2}) in 2013 to 12 sq mi (31 km^{2}) in 2016 to 16 sq mi (41 km^{2}) as of 2023. The temperature inside remains around 70 °F (21 °C) year-round.

=== Operations ===
Mining takes place using the room and pillar system. Salt is removed by drilling holes filled with ammonium nitrate, an explosive, then transported by conveyor belt and cut before it is lifted to the surface. Pillars are left behind for support and allowed to flex in a technique called "yielding pillar". There are hundreds of rooms in the mine, and each room has a height of about 25 ft (7.6 m) and an area of about 45 ft^{2} (4.2 m^{2}). They branch off east and west from a 4-mile (6.4 km) primary tunnel extending to the north. According to engineer David Harris, "it’s surprisingly similar to how it was mined 50 years ago".

As of 2023, there were 223 workers at the mine. The miners are members of the union Teamsters Local 436. Equipment is transported down the mine in pieces and, once assembled, remains underground forever. Maintenance is also performed underground. The low humidity prevents the machinery from quickly rusting.

=== Yield ===
The average yield is 12,000 short tons (11,000 t) per day. According to engineering manager Bob Nelson, demand for salt is relatively stable compared to other parts of the mining industry. Superintendent Nick Newsome claims that "about 80 percent of our production goes to de-icing control". Salt is also used in the manufacture of a wide variety of materials. The mine supplies salt across the Snow Belt and was the largest supplier for Ohio in 2012. Shipping by boat takes place from April to the end of the year.

As of 2013, reserves are expected to last for another 100 years.

== History ==
For most of the 19th century, Cleveland relied on salt from Youngstown or out-of-state. The present deposit was discovered accidentally in 1886 when drilling for natural gas. Construction of the mine began in 1958 by the International Salt Company. Production began in 1962, and the company would be renamed Akzo Nobel Salt following an acquisition. The mine was acquired by Cargill in 1997. The company launched a $13.8 million expansion of operations in 2010.

In 2012, Cargill, along with Morton, its only competitor in the state, were the target of an antitrust lawsuit filed by the Ohio Attorney General. The suit alleged price fixing in rock salt sold to state and local governments. In 2015, the case settled for $11.5 million.

=== 2013 shutdown ===
On August 19, 2013, the mine was shut down indefinitely after the discovery of a potential cave-in threat. Sensors had detected a convergence, or narrowing between the floor and ceiling, measuring fractions of an inch. Local geologists suspected that it was caused by weight sagging above and predicted that the closure would not be permanent. Below-ground workers were given paid leave while the company brought in consultants from the Ohio Department of Natural Resources (ODNR) and the Mine Safety and Health Administration (MSHA). Above ground operations, including shipping, were not affected. Operations gradually resumed starting ten days later after determining that the affected area was isolated.
