= Fednav =

Canadian maritime transport company

- Company type: Corporation
- Industry: Shipping
- Founded: 1944
- Headquarters: Montreal, Canada
- Key people: Paul Pathy, President and CEO
- Products: Bulk cargo
- Number of employees: 220 office staff worldwide 1,389 on board ships
- Website: www.fednav.com

Fednav is a privately owned Canadian company in the maritime transport industry, involved in transporting over 30 million tonnes of bulk cargo and break bulk cargo worldwide. Its fleet comprises approximately 120 long-term and spot-chartered vessels. The fleet includes most of St. Lawrence Seaway's maximum-sized bulk carriers, Supramax, and Panamax vessels.

== Business units and subsidiaries ==
The core companies include Fednav Limited, Fednav International Ltd., Fednav Atlantic Lakes Line (FALLine), and Arctic Operations, Projects, and Ice Services. The company has offices in Montreal, Tokyo, Antwerp, Geneva, Hamburg, São Paulo and Singapore.

In 2023, Fednav sold both Federal Marine Terminals, Inc. (FMT), which provided stevedoring services, and Fednav Direct, which handled logistics such as warehousing and ground transportation, to focus on pure-play shipping.

Fednav has operated in the Canadian Arctic through its icebreakers. Fednav ships operate in Arctic waters year-round, servicing Northern mines of nickel, zinc, lead, copper, and iron ore, among other things. Many of the ships in the Fednav fleet are strengthened for navigation on ice. Most of its vessels are classified with the Ice Class 1C* notation by DNV, allowing them to work in the Canadian Arctic with the assistance of icebreakers. Three vessels in the Fednav fleet, the 2006-built Umiak I, 2014-built MV Nunavik and 2021-built Arvik I, are fitted with icebreaker bows and have enough ice-strengthening and installed power to operate independently in Arctic ice conditions. Fednav's Arctic fleet is also equipped with an in-house developed shipboard navigation system designed for vessels operating in ice-covered waters worldwide. This tool allows operators to view and monitor sea ice using RADARSAT-2 technology. Fednav vessels operating in the Arctic must have specially trained ice advisors on board, who inform the ship's master on issues such as minimizing ice accretion.

== Fleet ==
As of 2023, Fednav owns a fleet of 61 ships. All of the ships lie in the range of 32,500 DWT to 56,000 DWT. Two ships are registered in Canada, two in Panama, and the rest in the Marshall Islands.

The rest of Fednav's fleet consists of 40 to 60 short- and long-term charters depending on the time of year. The current 33 long-term chartered ships were built between 2010 and 2023. Twenty-three are between 55,000 DWT to 63,600 DWT and the rest fall in the range of 37,300 DWT to 42,700 DWT. One of these ships is registered in Malta, one in Singapore, two in Liberia and the balance are registered in the Marshall Islands or Panama. The total DWT of the owned and long-term chartered fleet is over 4,100,000 mt, with an average age of about 8 years.

== Gallery ==
Fednav

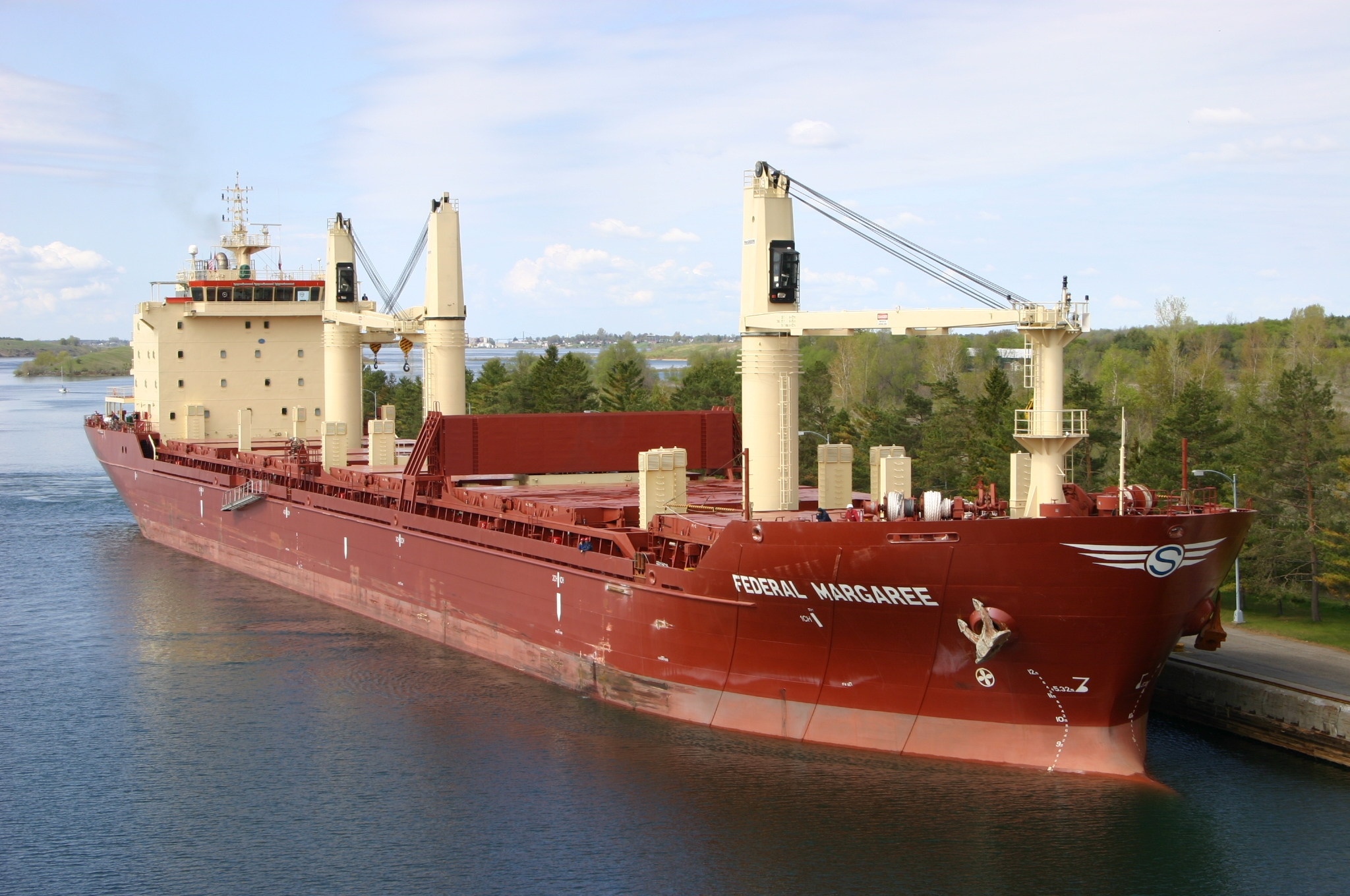
Federal Margaree on the St. Lawrence Seaway

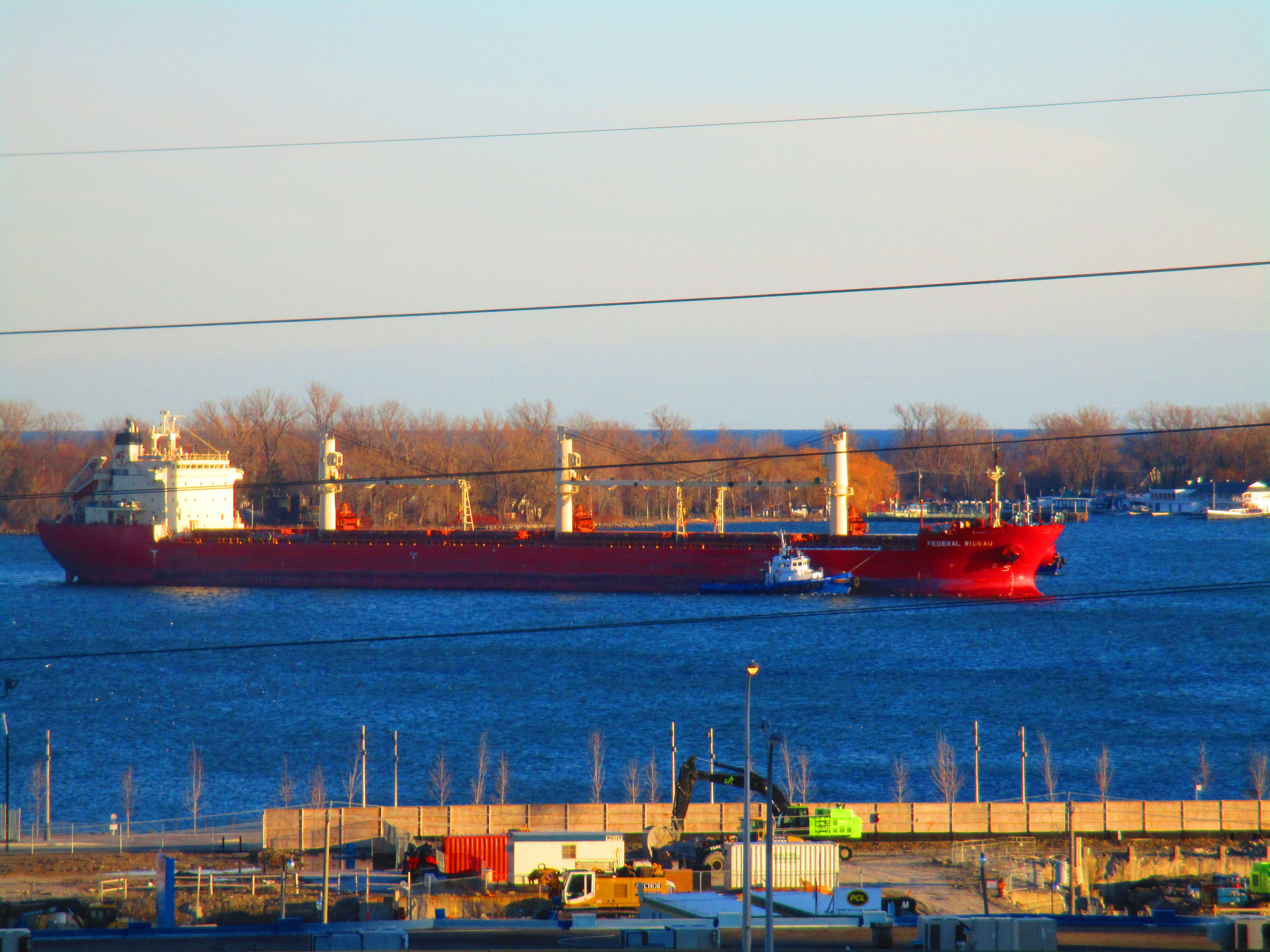
Federal Rideau

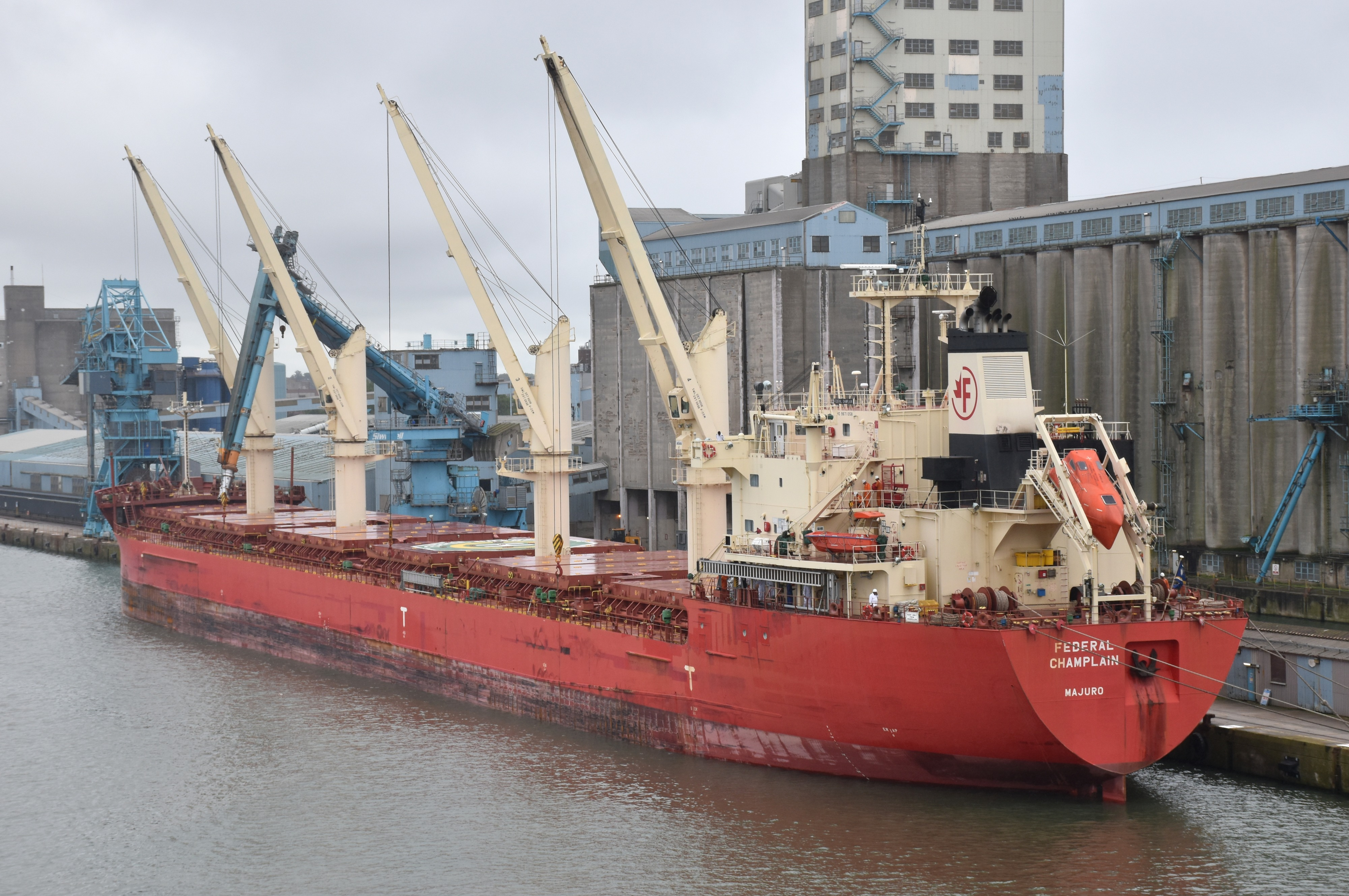
Federal Champlain in the port of Liverpool

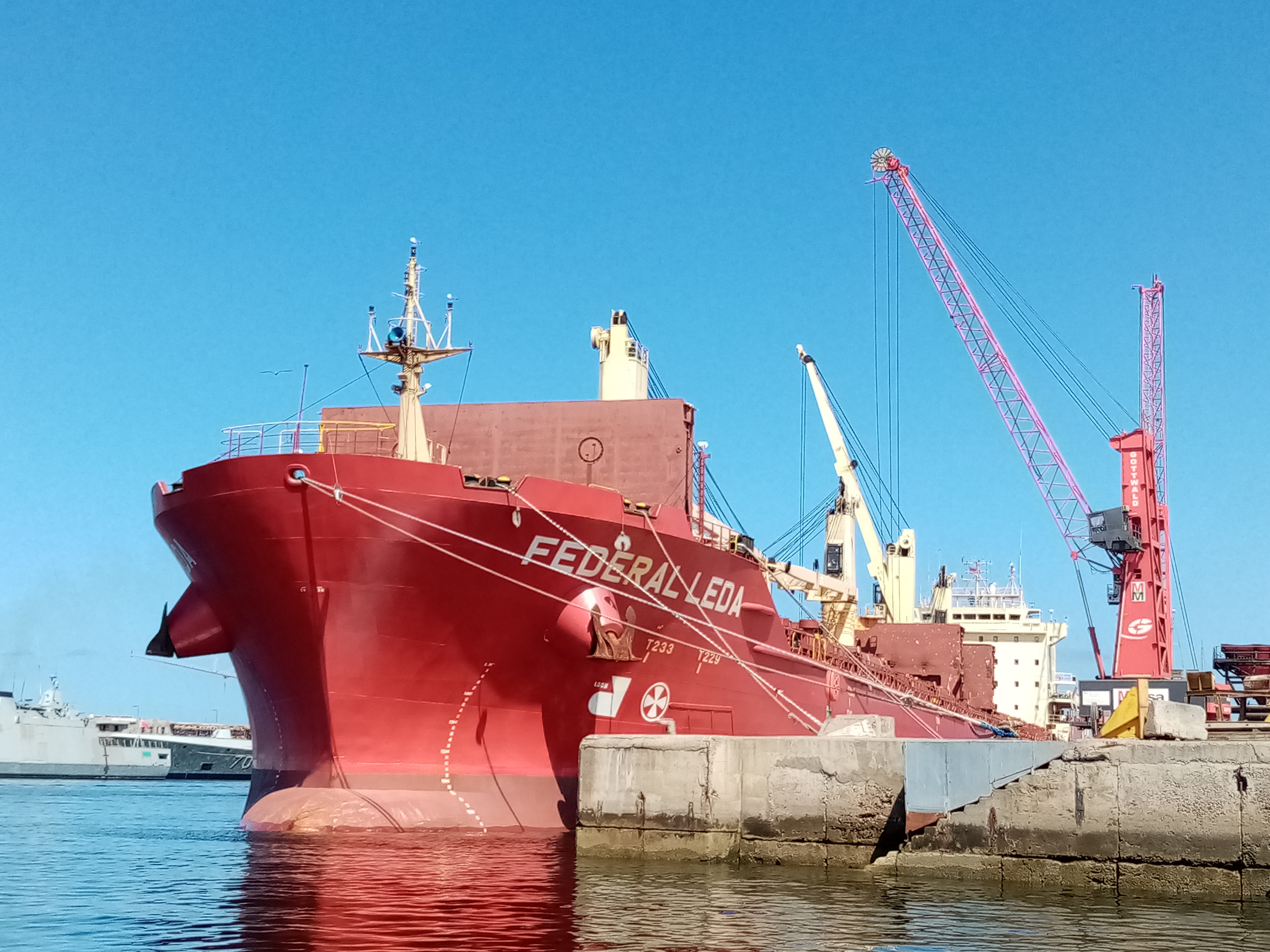
Federal Leda in the Port of Casablanca
