= Peche Island =

Windsor, Ontario

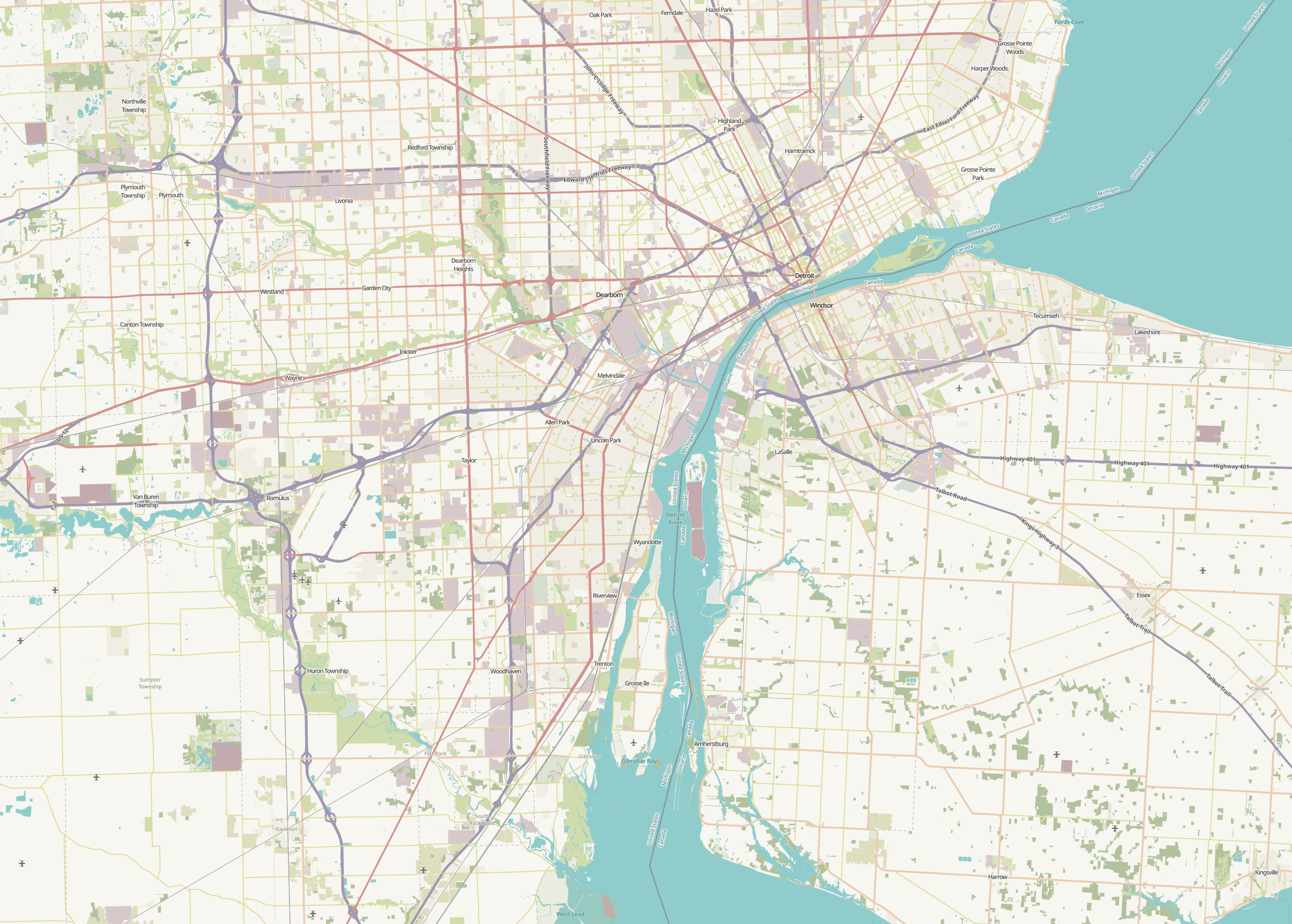
- Location within Wayne County, Michigan Location within Ontario

Geography
- Location: Detroit River
- Coordinates: 42°20′45″N 82°55′31″W
- Area: 86 acres (35 ha)
- Highest elevation: 574 ft (175 m)

Administration
- Canada
- Province: Ontario
- County: Essex
- City: Windsor

Demographics
- Population: 0 (permanent)

Peche Island (French pronunciation anglicized to /ˈpiːtʃ/, therefore occasionally misspelled "Peach"), is an uninhabited, currently 86-acre (35 ha) (reduced by erosion from a 1965 measurement of 109 acres / 43.7 ha) Canadian island in the Detroit River, at its opening into Lake Saint Clair. It is 1.2 miles (1.9 km) east of U.S. island Belle Isle, and 360 yards (330 m) from the Windsor shore.

The island was formed from a peninsula of the Canadian shore by the action of the Detroit River. There is a central marsh on the island. The present channel was eroded until the core of the island remained. There are man-made channels cut through the island to ensure fresh water supply and recreational opportunities. The island's flora and fauna have been heavily affected by human activity, and the forest is the result of a rehabilitation programme.

Formerly an Ontario provincial park, ownership was transferred to the City of Windsor in 1999.

The island offers attractive Detroit city views, a wide sandy beach and shallow river bottom, and is a favorite with summer boaters. As of June 27, 2018, the City of Windsor began to run a ferry service to the island for day trips. Tours operate on select days during the week and weekends, weather permitting, from June to October. Boaters, canoers and kayakers can enjoy the island's trails and beaches and approximately 2.5 miles (4 km) of canals. The park is open only during the day. Sailors are advised to anchor along the southern shore of the island, abeam the Windsor Yacht Club. Speed between red buoy DP2 west of Peche Island and green buoy DP5 east of Peche Island must be held below 5 knots (9 km/h). For kayakers, the circumnavigation distance is approximately 3 miles (4.8 km).

From November through March large numbers of waterfowl, especially canvasback, redhead, lesser scaup, common goldeneye and common merganser, are all found in the nearby waters. Peregrine falcons and bald eagles are often attracted by these large flocks and can sometimes be seen perched in the island's larger treetops, or in the nesting platforms constructed by the Essex County Field Naturalists' Club. Muskie, walleye, bass, bluegill and perch are found in the waters surrounding the island, and fishing pressures are reported low. Water quality is good, and carefully monitored, as the City of Windsor's supply is drawn from nearby. Peche Island is one of the few places where the rare blue ash tree (Fraxinus quadrangulata) can be found.

== Name ==
Early French explorers' maps state the island was named Isle au Large, or Isle du Large. Possible meanings include "at a distance", since Peche Island is the farthest island upstream, on the Detroit River, before entering Lake St. Clair, or "keep your distance", because of dangerous shallows on the north side.

The island was next called variations of "Peche" Isle, including Isle aux Pecheurs and Isle a la Peche (Isle à la Peche), the French word for "fishing" - the island was once used as a fishing station. Local accounts from folk onomastics have incorrectly derived the name from a peach orchard once located there, or connected the name with the French word for "sin", claiming the island was once the preferred site for duels and assignations.

== History ==
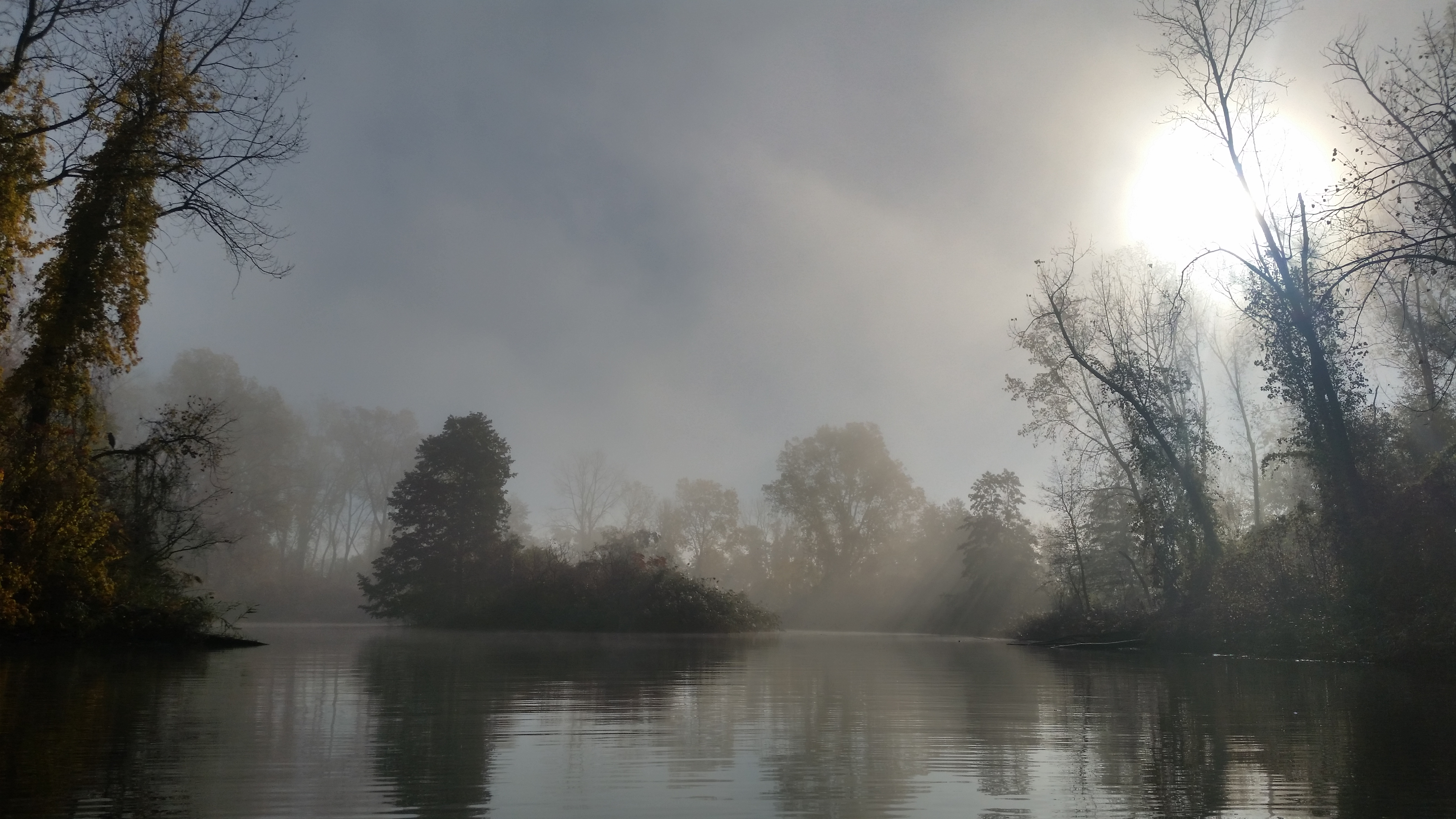
Foggy morning inside the island

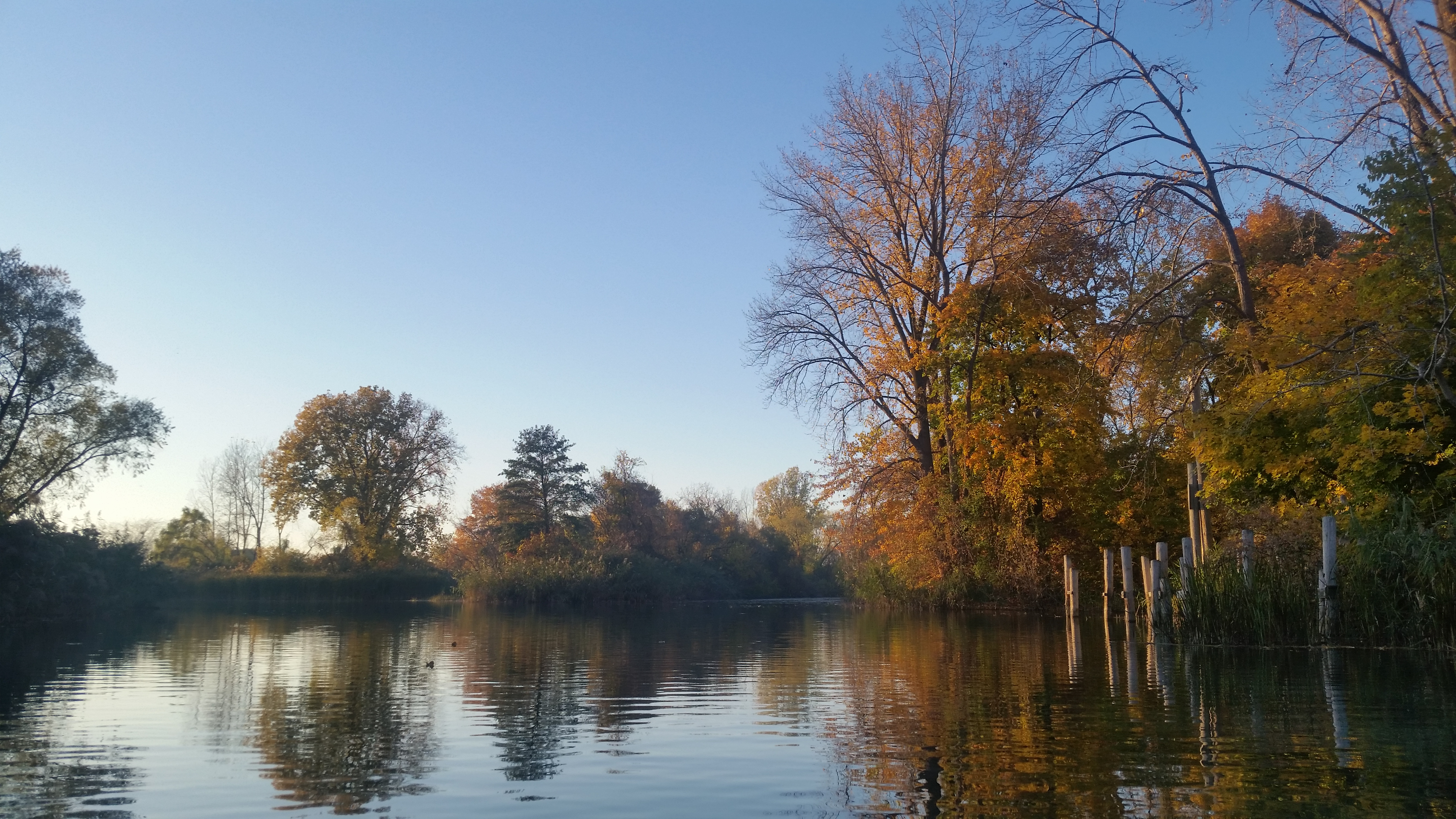
An autumn evening inside the island

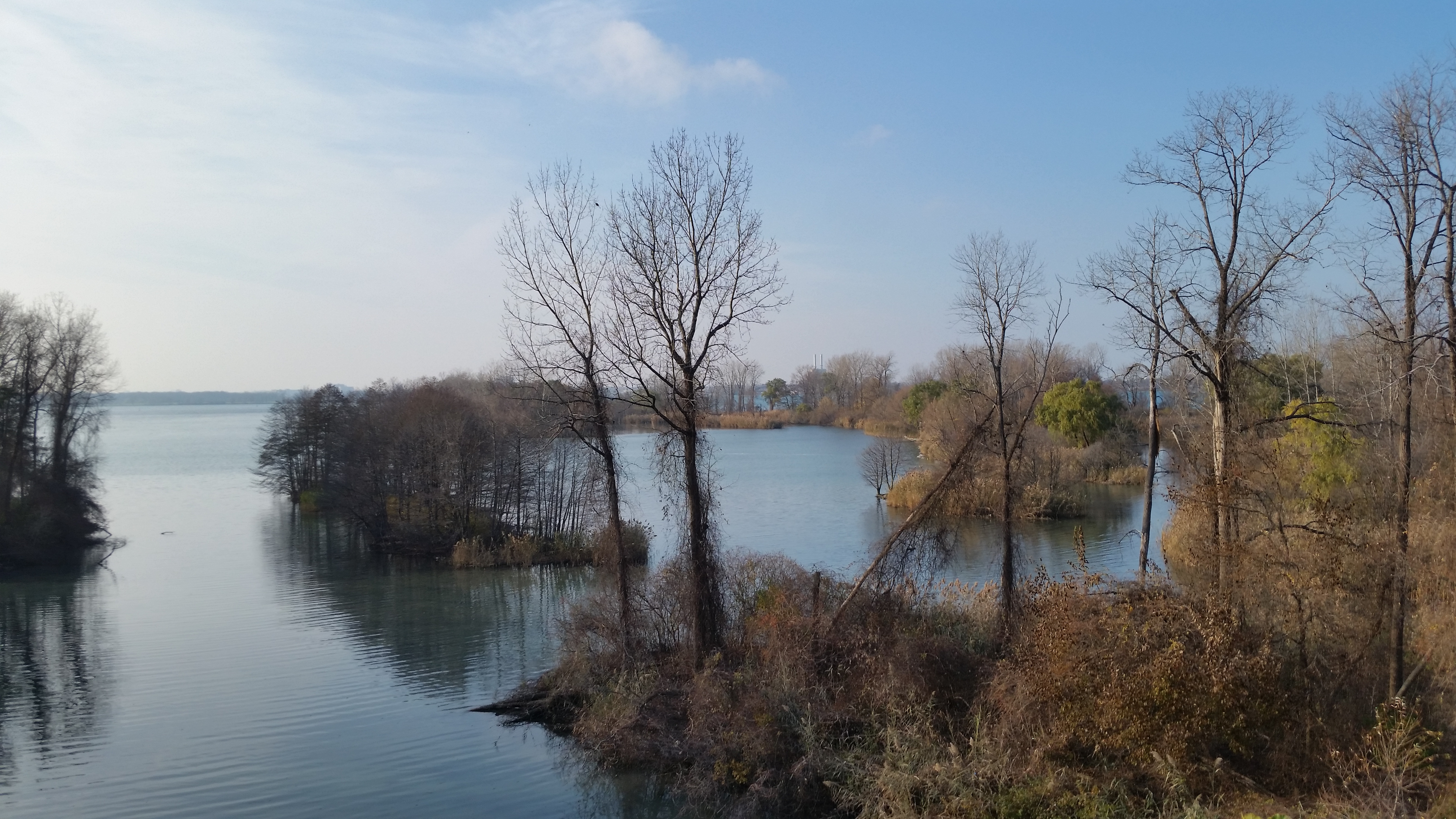
Treetop view from inside the island

The island was used by natives and Ottawa Native Chief Pontiac in the summer months. It was a known as a Native fishing village because of the abundance of white fish in the waters surrounding it. After the coming of the Europeans, Alexis Maisonville purchased the island in 1774 from the Ottawa Natives. This purchase was later revoked by Governor Dorchester, and all islands became Native lands. 1802 Alexi Maisonville in the Upper Canada Land Petitions (1763–1865) Petitions for the Occupation of Peche Island. George Meldrum wrote this on behalf of Alexi Maisonville petition for Peche Island.

“I certify that I was present when the Chiefs of the Ottawa Nation signed a deed of gift of an Island commonly called the Fishing Island in favour of Alexis Maisonville and after wards went with said Maisonville with others to the said Island where we found the same Indians who dug up a sod and delivered it to Maisonville saying by this we put you in possession of this Island and confirm the deed we have signed all this was performed in the year of Our Lord one thousand seen hundred & Seventy two to the best of my knowledge.”

Detroit 19 May 1802

George Meldrum

The first and only known permanent residents of the island were a French-Canadian family named LaForest. In 1775 Louisa St. Aubin gave birth to an illegitimate son Charles in 1774. She married on February 2, 1780 at Ste Anne church Detroit to Antoine LaForest, son of William and Marguerite Tremblay, settlers at Grosse Pointe (Grand Marais) in 1750 when the King gave land grants for settlement in Detroit. She gave birth on January 15, 1781 to her second child, Jean Marie Laforest, was not born on the island. There is evidence that the LaForests were living with Indians, and treated as if they were natives at this time. There is also evidence that her grandmother, Louise Gauthier St. Aubin, was fluent in the native language and went to the Ottawa village to exchange her baked goods for honey and bear grease.

They shared the island with local natives. According to Laforest family records the LaForest dit Tineau families never had a deed to the island. They did ask for Liberty of the island in 1832. They received the right to fish on it. Even when ownership was transferred to the Crown by the Chippewa Indians in 1857, they were not asked to leave the island. A survey done by J. Barthey on February 14, 1859 shows three homes on the island. They were log huts and 16 x 32 ft with an outhouse behind each one. The names on the homes were Charles Jr, Oliver and Benjamin. Charles and Benjamin were the sons of Charles LaForest dit Tineau and Ursula Soulliere. Oliver was the son of Joseph LaForest and Marie Anne Casavan. Oliver left the island and his brother Leon took it from him.

In the tax rolls of 1868 in Sandwich Ontario these three are listed as living on Peche Island: Charles Teno Lafforette, Benjamin Teno Lafforette and Leon Lafforette. They had 18 acres of land each. It was Charles LaForest dit Tineau's sons that sold the island for 300 dollars to William Gasper Hall. They left Peche Island to farm on land across from the island where their brothers Jean Baptist and Antoine had been farming since 1838.

Leon and his wife and family remained on the island after the sale. They were very poor. In 1877 he could not pay his taxes of $13.92 and was listed as a very poor person. He died in 1881 in Tecumseh, Ontario. His daughter Sophie Rose Champine, on behalf of her mother Rosalie Drouillard LaForest, started the inquiry into the sale of the island. They felt they did not agree to sell their share of it. They had moved to River Rouge at the time of this dispute. It was her mother Rosalie who supposedly gave the "curse of Peche island".

Hiram Walker's sons purchased the property in 1883, from the estate of William G. Hall. There is a fable that the property was forcefully taken from the Laforet family by Hiram Walker's men and was cursed by the Laforets as they left.

It was used as a summer home by Hiram Walker, who attempted, for many years, to develop it. Canals were dug to bring in supplies and to ensure the flow of fresh water. Yachts were purchased — the Pastime and the Lurline — for travelling to the island from Walker's office and for cruises and parties on the river and lakes.

Walker built a 40-room mansion. He planted many trees and established an orchard, along with building a greenhouse to cultivate flowers. He next added a golf course, stables, icehouse and a carriage house. A generator for electric power was constructed. Today, the only visible construction on the island is the ruins of the Walker estate, the result of a 1929 fire.

Walker employed the botanical services of Rolla James Coryell, whose family owned approximately 80 acres (devoted to nurseries and orchards) in Birmingham, Michigan (The Coryell Brothers were all graduates of the Michigan State University Agriculture, Botany, and Farming School). As Walker was developing the island as well as his estate outside of Windsor (Kingsville, Ontario), he allowed Rolla and his wife Mabel Owen Coryell to live on the island.

On August 23, 1894 a daughter was born to Rolla and Mabel on Peche Island and was christened Helen Walker Coryell (the Walker as a middle name was a salutation to their employer). Helen Walker Coryell (1894–1978) is the only known birth that occurred on the island.

According to The Ferry Steamers: The Story of the Detroit-Windsor Ferry Boats by William Oxford, the Detroit, Belle Isle, & Windsor Ferry Company, then owners of Boblo Island Park, bought the island in 1907. In 1913, the company announced plans to turn it into an amusement park. The ferry company president, Walter Campbell, lived in Walker's summer home while planning to turn it at least temporarily into the central pavilion of his new resort. He died there at the age of 71 in 1923.

The island passed to DWFC's successor, the Bob-Lo Excursion Company, in 1939. No further development took place, and the island was sold in 1956 and then again in 1962, this time to E. J. Harris, who envisioned a $30 million resort. He paid $1500 per month for the island, which he intended to expand by 500 acres (200 ha) with fill. Dredging started in 1965 for a 1000-well marina. The plan included an 18-hole golf course, plus Canadian-themed recreation areas: ice skating, a ski hill, restaurants, a hotel, reforestation, and possible cable car service from Windsor and Detroit. On-island transport would be by horse and carriage and dog sleds. The project was to be completed by 1972. As a 1968 newspaper ad advertised the area, at least some of this work had actually been done. He constructed several buildings, and sewage, hydro, water and telephone were connected to the mainland. The project operated for one season with ferry boats from Dieppe Park and barges from Riverside. However, due to mismanagement, Harris ran into stiff opposition from neighbours and local political leaders. By 1971 he had lost $700,000 and was over $500,000 in debt. He offered Peche Island for auction.

The island passed briefly through the hands of a developer who foresaw an exclusive residential community on the island before the Government of Ontario bought it back for $400,000 in 1974. Early plans to develop the island as a nature area, with groomed trails, mooring facilities and shelters, stalled for lack of funds. During provincial ownership it was designated as provincial park but never operated as one.

While originally hoping to obtain the island for $1.00, the City of Windsor acquired the land from the Province of Ontario on January 1, 1999 for a reported fee of $1.3 million. Included in the purchase, the city also got 276.7 acres of water lots and 1.3 acres on the mainland, on the north side of Riverside Drive East next to Lakeview Marina. There are no plans to develop the island beyond maintaining public toilets.

On January 16, 2018, the City of Windsor announced it was going to spend $CAD 1 million on a pontoon boat for residents that do not have their own boats or canoes or kayaks, but still wish to visit the island, as well as for new signage regarding the new ferry service. The boat would have a capacity of around a dozen or so pedestrians or cyclists and operate in the summer only. This is the result of an earlier proposal from 2009.

== Wrecks ==
In 1865, the 38-ton schooner Eugenie wrecked on Peche Island. The steamship Oneida ran aground there in July 1871. On July 8, 1998, the Tadoussac ran aground 2 miles (3.2 km) east of Peche Island.

== Lighthouse ==
The Peche Island Rear Range Light was built of cast iron in 1908 to mark the narrow passage from Lake St. Clair to the Detroit River and guarded the reef for some 75 years. It was never staffed.

In 1926 the height was raised to 66 feet (20 m) and with that additional height the tower protected the passage until September 23, 1983, when it was scheduled for decommission and destruction. Learning of the plan to demolish the tower, a rescue effort was begun by Marine City, Michigan to relocate it to a site in the city's Waterworks Park. The tower's weight is 35 tons and with the height of 66 feet (20 m) and a diameter of 14 feet (4.3 m) the move took ingenuity and perseverance, but was finally successful.
