= Whiskey Island (Cleveland) =

Peninsula in Cleveland, Ohio, United States

Coordinates: 41.497489°N 81.717296°W

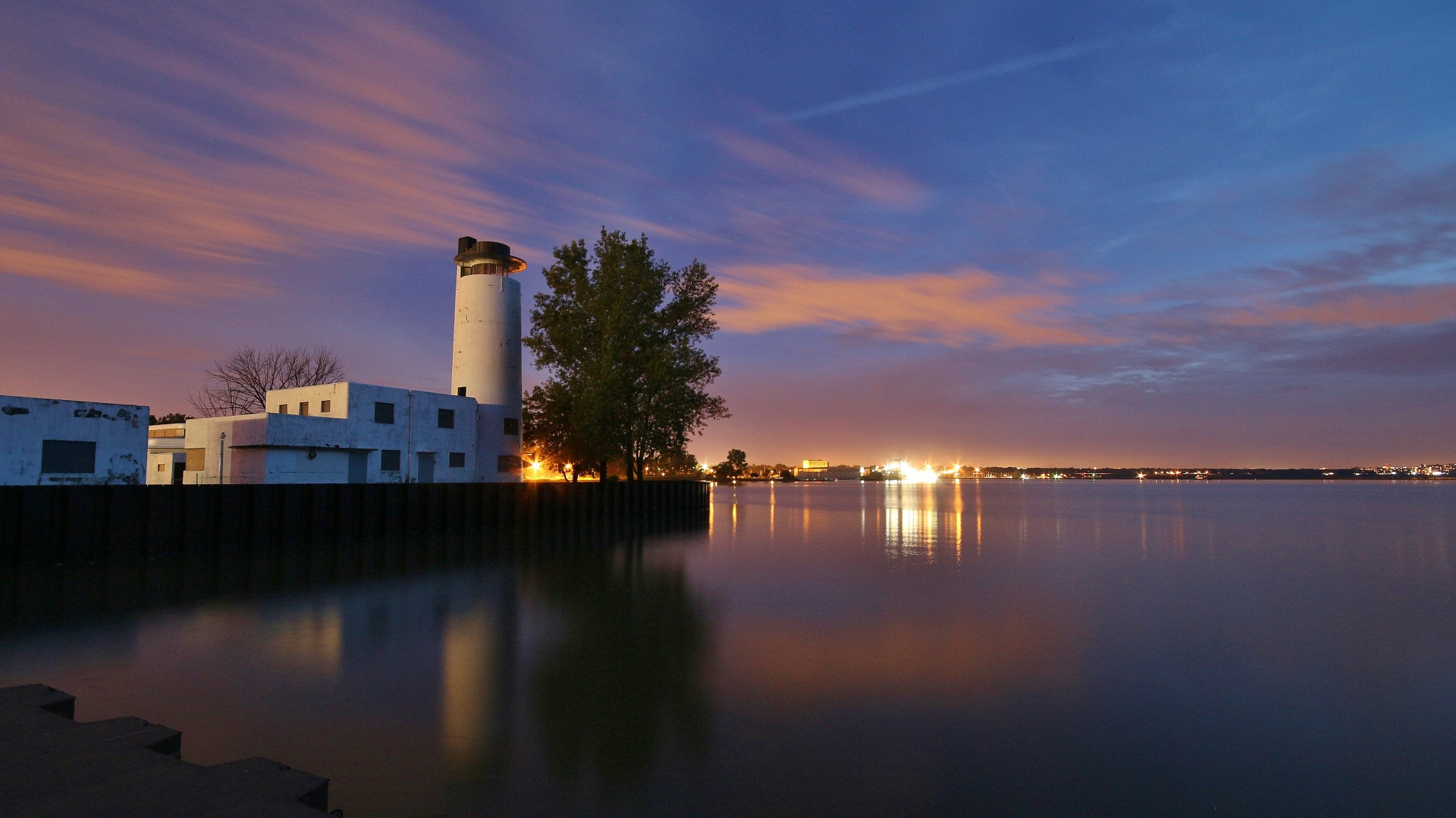
- Whiskey Island Coast Guard station at sunset
- Interactive map of Whiskey Island

Geography
- Location: North America
- Adjacent to: Lake Erie; Cuyahoga River

Administration
- United States
- State: Ohio
- County: Cuyahoga
- City: Cleveland
- Neighborhood: Cuyahoga Valley

Whiskey Island is a peninsula at the mouth of the Cuyahoga River at Lake Erie in Cleveland, Ohio. Its current configuration was created in 1827 when the river's mouth was moved to its present location. Part of the city's Cuyahoga Valley neighborhood, the peninsula is 1 mile (1.6 km) long and 0.3 miles (0.48 km) at its widest, bounded by Lake Erie to the north, West 54th Street on the west (roughly), and the Cuyahoga River to the south and east.

The western half of Whiskey Island is occupied by the Cleveland Bulk Terminal. The eastern section is home to a marina and public park, known as Wendy Park, which forms part the Lakefront Reservation of the Cleveland Metroparks.

== History ==
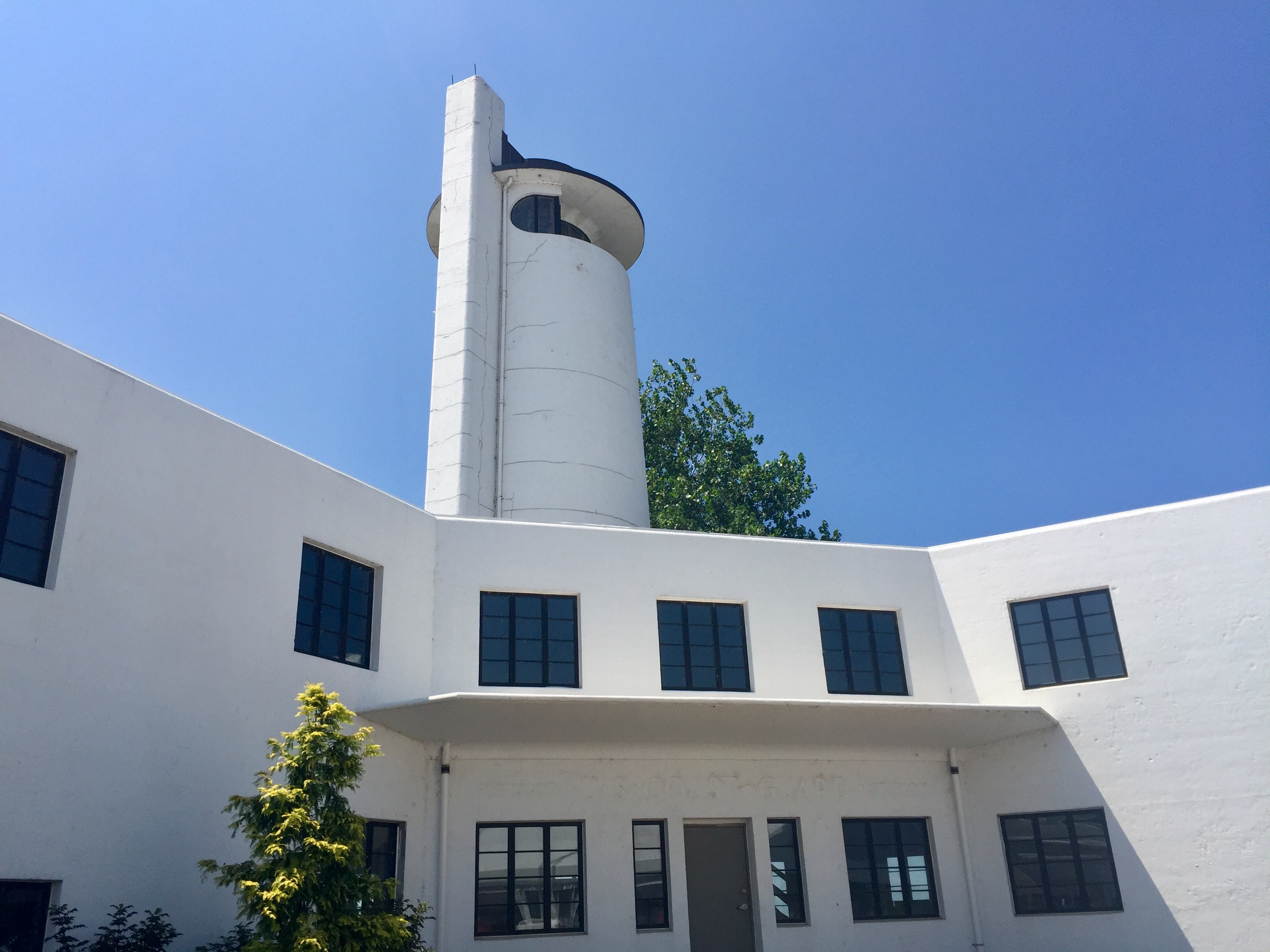
Whiskey Island Coast Guard station

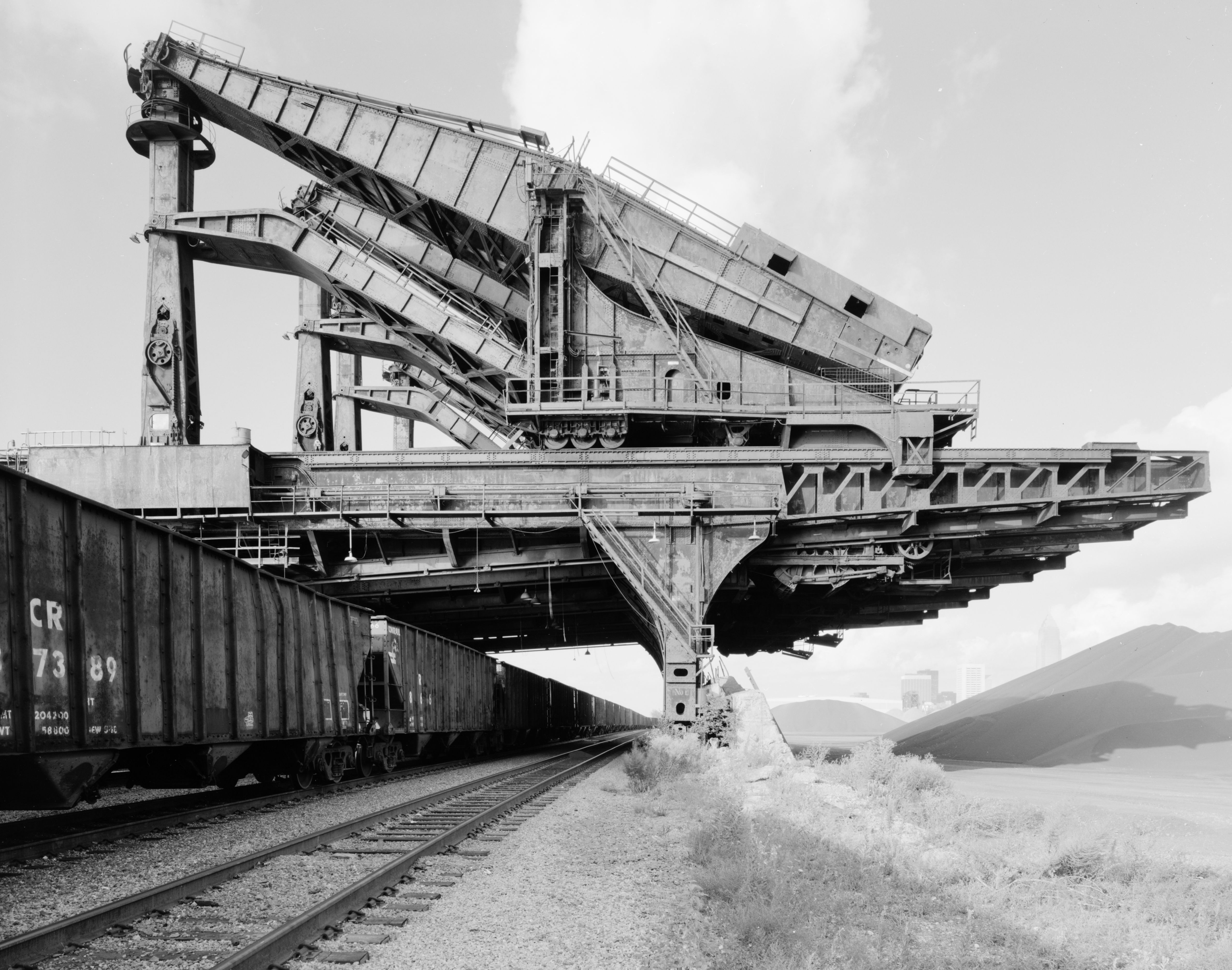
Whiskey Island Huletts

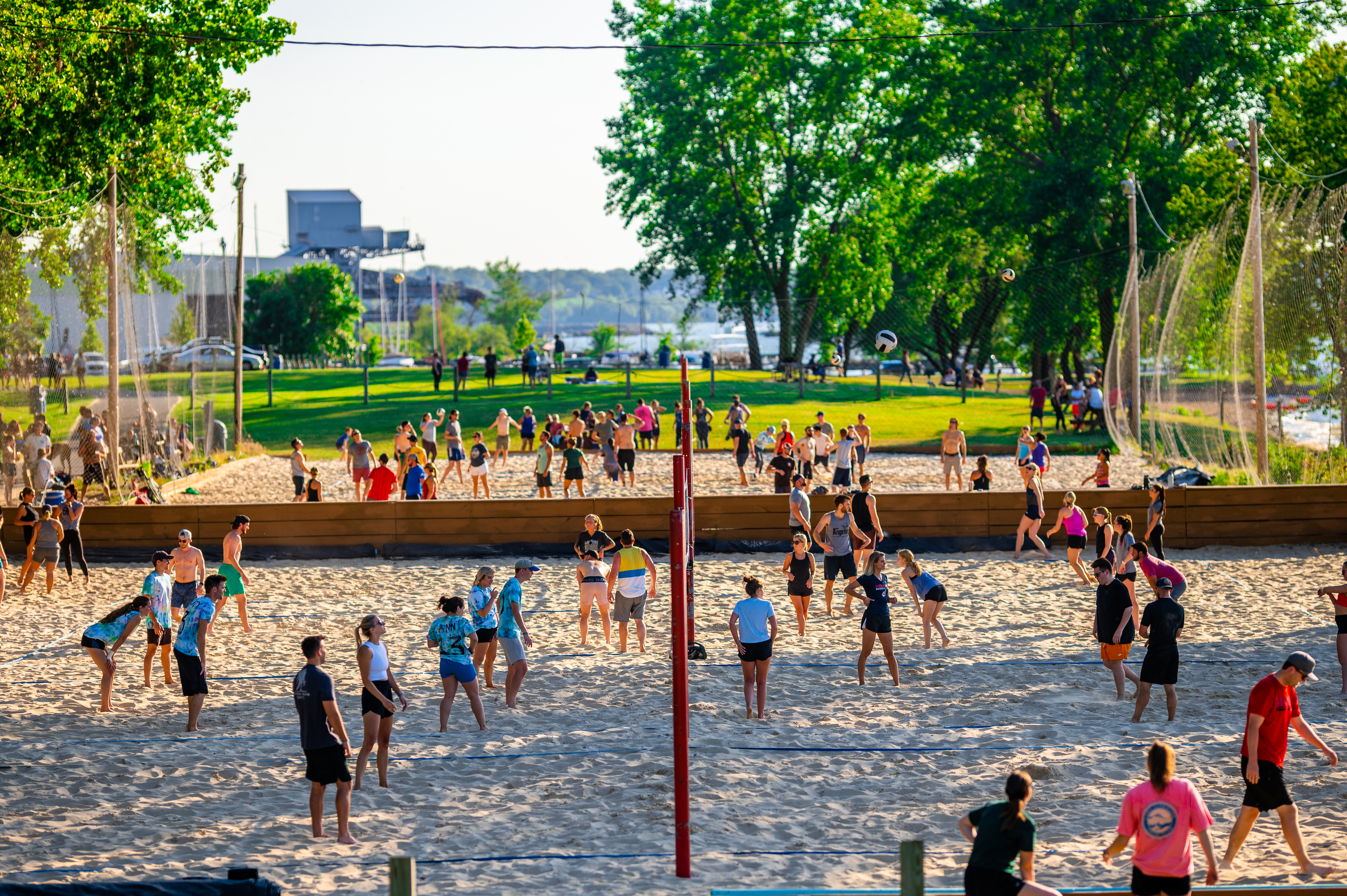
Sand volleyball at Whiskey Island's Wendy Park

=== 19th century ===
Whiskey Island was the first piece of solid land amid the swamps lining the river one-quarter mile down the Cuyahoga when Moses Cleaveland visited the area in 1796. Lorenzo Carter built his family farm on Whiskey Island, which got its name after a distillery was built on the site in the 1830s.

The area was settled, largely by Irish immigrants, when the Ohio and Erie Canal was constructed in 1825 and the river was rechanneled in 1827. In 1831 the Buffalo Co. and the New Harbor Co., representing investors from Buffalo and Brooklyn, purchased the Carter farm and divided its 80 acres (320,000 m^{2}) into allotments along 22 streets. Manufacturing plants and docks were constructed. The Lake Erie Iron Works made steamboat shafts and railroad axles on the island and thirteen saloons were located in the area.

Cleveland's second hospital, the "pest house," was built on Whiskey Island following the Cholera epidemic of 1832. The Cleveland and Toledo Railroad (later the New York Central) ran its northern division through Whiskey Island "stopping at the river to ferry its passengers across the Cuyahoga because the city refused permission for the railroad to connect to the eastbound line".

=== 20th century ===
The Irish moved from Whiskey Island when better employment and housing opportunities became available and except for a Depression-era Hooverville, Whiskey Island was left largely to the railroads, a salt mine owned by Cargill, and the set of four large Hulett ore unloaders at the Pennsylvania Railway Ore Dock, which when built in 1911 was the largest ore-unloading dock on the Great Lakes. The Huletts were dismantled by the Cleveland-Cuyahoga County Port Authority in 2000 to create room for additional bulk storage. Two of the Hullets were scrapped, and the other two were disassembled and remain on the site.

The Coast Guard built its Cleveland station at the end of a pier north of Whiskey Island. A second station, designed by architect J. Milton Dyer, opened in 1940. The Coast Guard operated at the site until 1976, when they relocated the search and rescue station to new facilities at the Coast Guard moorings on East Ninth Street. The old station has sat unused since then, except for a brief period in the early 1990s when it served as a nightclub. The City of Cleveland purchased the station for $1 in 2003, and is developing plans for its restoration and reuse.

=== 21st century ===
In the early 2000s, the Cleveland-Cuyahoga County Port Authority pursued the purchase of the eastern portion of Whiskey Island in order to expand port facilities; however, the port did not buy the land. The open space and marina were purchased by Cuyahoga County in 2004 and preserved as a public park. The area's protection was due in large part to the efforts of activist Ed Hauser, known as the "Mayor of Whiskey Island". Wendy Park at Whiskey Island opened to the public in 2005, and includes sand volleyball courts, a prairie garden, and a restaurant-bar. In 2014, Whiskey Island was purchased by the Cleveland Metroparks. About 7,000 people visited Wendy Park in 2005. The number rose to more than 180,000 in 2010.

== See also ==
- The Flats
