= Ice accretion indicator =

Meteorological instrument

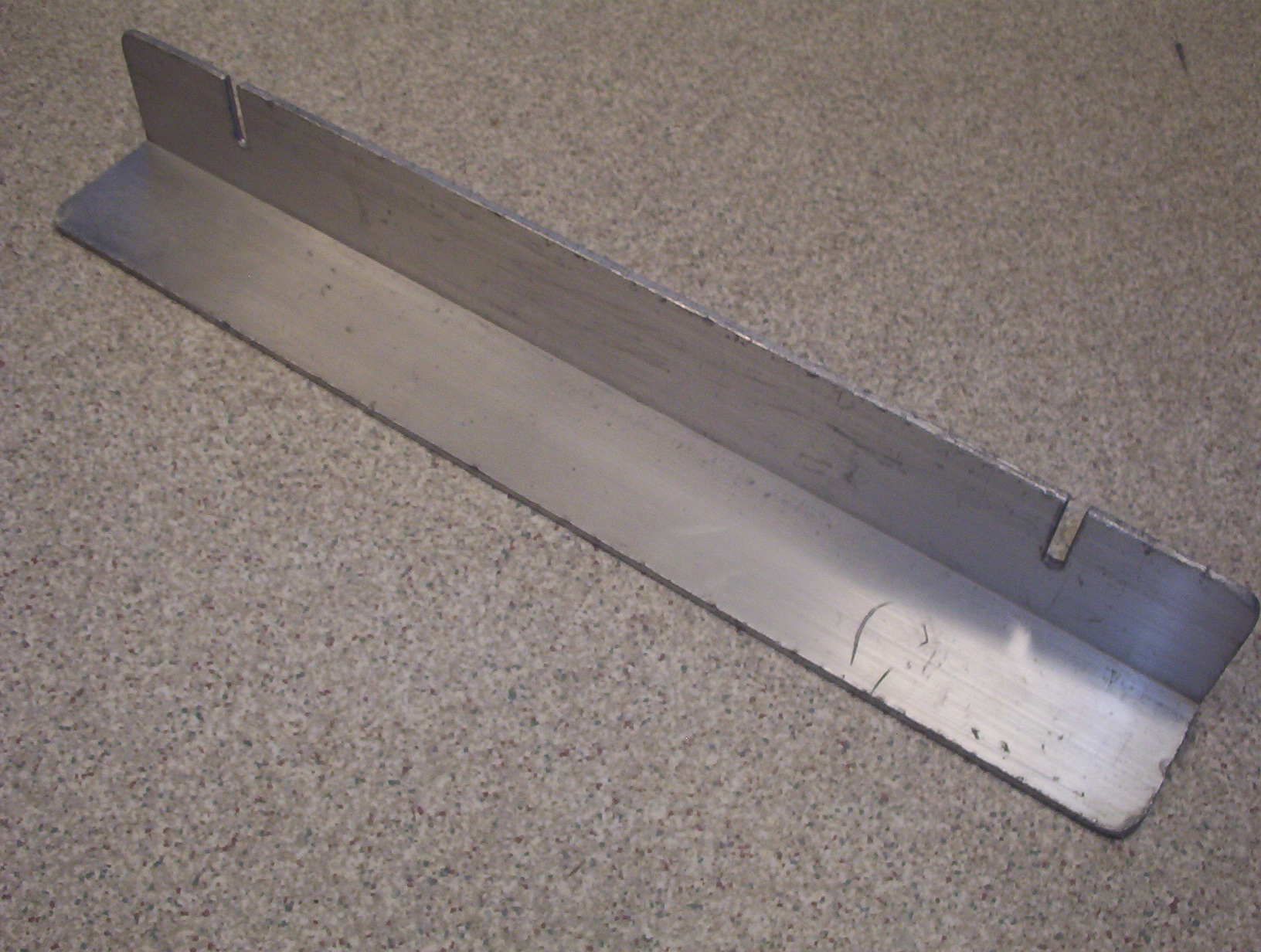
Standard ice accretion indicator (upside down)

An ice accretion indicator is an L-shaped piece of aluminium 38 cm (15 in) long by 4 to 5 cm (1.6 to 2.0 in) wide. It is used to indicate the formation of ice, frost or the presence of freezing rain or freezing drizzle.

It is normally attached to a Stevenson screen, about 1 m (3 ft 3 in) above ground, but may be mounted in other areas away from any artificial heat sources. The weather station would have two on site and they would be exchanged after every weather observation. The spare indicator should always be at the outside air temperature to ensure that it is ready for use and would normally be stored inside the screen.

If the observer notes the presence of ice or frost on the indicator then a remark to that effect should be sent in the next weather observation. Examples of these are 'rime icing on indicator' and 'FROIN' (frost on indicator). As the indicator is at air temperature and is kept horizontal it provides an excellent surface on which to observe freezing precipitation.

== See also ==
- Automated airport weather station
