= Straight-seven engine =

Type of internal combustion engine

Straight-seven engine with firing order 1-3-5-7-2-4-6

A straight-seven engine (also known as a inline-seven engine) is a straight engine with seven cylinders. It is more common in marine applications because these engines are usually based on a modular design, with individual heads per cylinder.

== Marine engines ==
Straight-seven engines produced for marine usage include:

- Wärtsilä-Sulzer RTA96-C two-stroke crosshead diesel engine
- Wärtsilä 32 trunk piston engines
- MAN Diesel IMO two-stroke crosshead diesel engine
- Burmeister & Wain 722VU37 two-stroke diesel engine (commenced 1937, used in the Danish Havmanden-class submarines
- Sulzer 7QD42 diesel engine (1939-1940, used in the Dutch O 21-class submarines).
- English Electric 7SKM diesel engine (used in some Port Jackson & Manly Steamship Company ferries)

== Land use ==
The AGCO Sisu 98HD is a straight-seven diesel engine that was released in 2008. Intended for farming machinery, the engine shares various components with the company's straight-six engine.
