= Pioneer =

Pioneer commonly refers to a person who is among the first at something that is new to a community.

A pioneer as a settler is among the first settling at a place that is new to the settler community. A historic example are American pioneers, persons in American history who migrated westward to settle in what is now the Western and Midwestern United States.

Pioneer, The Pioneer, or pioneering may also refer to:

== Companies and organizations ==
- Pioneer Aerospace Corporation
- Pioneer Chicken, an American fast-food restaurant chain
- Pioneer Club Las Vegas, a casino in Las Vegas, Nevada, U.S.
- Pioneer Corporation, a Japanese electronics manufacturer
- Pioneer Energy, a Canadian gas station chain
- Pioneer Entertainment, a Japanese anime company
- Pioneer Fund, racist foundation, 1937
- Pioneer Hi-Bred, a U.S.-based agriculture company
- Pioneer Hotel & Gambling Hall, Laughlin, Nevada, U.S.
- Pioneer Instrument Company, an American aeronautical instrument manufacturer
- Pioneer movement, a communist youth organization
- Pioneer Natural Resources, a defunct energy company in Texas, U.S.
- Pioneer Pictures, a former American film studio
- Pioneer Surgical Technology, a medical technology company in Michigan, U.S.
- Pioneer Total Abstinence Association, Irish Catholics who avoid alcohol
- Pioneers (missions agency), a Christian missions organization

== Entertainment ==
=== Visual Arts ===
- The Pioneer (painting) (1904), painting by Frederick McCubbin, Australia
- The Pioneer (Visalia, California) (c. 1915), sculpture by Solon H. Borglum, California
- The Pioneer (Eugene, Oregon) (1919), sculpture by Alexander Phimister Proctor, Oregon
- The Pioneer (Los Angeles) (1925), sculpture by Henry Lion, California
- The Pioneers (sculpture) (1928), sculpture by Lorado Taft, Illinois
- Pioneer Monument (disambiguation) for others named "Pioneer Monument" or "Pioneer Memorial"

=== Films ===
- The Pioneers (1903 film), an American silent film directed by Wallace McCutcheon, Sr.
- The Pioneers (1916 film), an Australian silent film directed by Franklyn Barrett
- The Pioneers (1926 film), an Australian silent film directed by Raymond Longford
- The Pioneers (1941 film), an American film directed by Albert Herman
- The Pioneers (1980 film), a Taiwanese film starring Hsu Feng
- Pioneer (film), a 2013 Norwegian film directed by Erik Skjoldbjærg
- The Pioneer (2021 film), a Chinese film directed by Xu Zhangxiong

=== Games ===
- Pioneer (pinball), a 1976 pinball machine produced by Gottlieb
- Pioneer (video game), a 2006 space trading and combat simulator

=== Music ===
==== Bands ====
- Pioneer (band), an American Christian music band
- The Pioneers (band), a Jamaican reggae vocal trio

==== Albums ====
- The Pioneers (album) by MC Eiht and Spice 1, 2004
- Pioneer (The Maine album), 2011
- Pioneer (Pioneer album), self titled album, 2012
- Pioneer (The Band Perry album), 2013

==== Songs ====
- "The Pioneers" (song) by Bloc Party, 2005
- "Pioneer" by The Band Perry, from Pioneer, 2013
- "Pioneer" (song) by Freddie, 2015
- "Pioneer" by Split Enz, the eighth track from Time and Tide, 1982
- "Pioneers", by For King & Country from Burn the Ships, 2018

== Literature ==
=== Books ===
- The Pioneers (novel), 1823, by James Fenimore Cooper
- The Pioneers, 1872 novel by R. M. Ballantyne
- The Pioneer, 1905 novel by Geraldine Bonner
- The Pioneer, 1912 novel by Harold Edward Bindloss
- The Pioneers, 1954 novel by Jack Schaefer
- Pioneers, 1986 novel by Phillip Mann
- The Pioneers: The Heroic Story of the Settlers Who Brought the American Ideal West, 2019 non-fiction book by David McCullough

=== Magazines and newspapers ===
- Pioneer (Russian magazine), a Soviet/Russian monthly magazine
- Pioneer (newspaper), various English-language newspapers
  - The Pioneer (South Australia), a newspaper
  - The Pioneer (India), an English-language newspaper published in India
- Pioneer (Estonian magazine)

== Military ==
- Pioneer (military), a soldier employed for engineering and construction tasks
- Pioneer Column, an 1890 force of the British South Africa Company
- AAI RQ-2 Pioneer, a U.S. military unmanned aerial vehicle
- RSD-10 Pioneer, a Soviet missile
- Scammell Pioneer Semi-trailer, a British tank recovery and transport vehicle
- Scottish Aviation Pioneer, a British military aircraft

== Places ==
=== Australia ===
- Pioneer, Queensland
- Pioneer, Tasmania
- Pioneer River, in Queensland
- Shire of Pioneer, a former local government area

=== United States ===
- Pioneer, Arizona
- Pioneer, California
- Pioneer, Florida
- Pioneer, Iowa
- Pioneer, Kansas
- Pioneer, Louisiana
- Pioneer, Missouri
- Pioneer, Nevada
- Pioneer, Ohio
- Pioneer, Tennessee
- Pioneer Township, Michigan
  - Pioneer, Michigan

=== Other places ===
- Pioneer, Alberta
- Pioneer, Singapore

== Rail transport ==
- Pioneer (locomotive), built in 1837
- Pioneer (train), an Amtrak passenger train
- Pioneer MRT station, a transit station in Singapore

== Schools ==
- Pioneer High School (Ann Arbor, Michigan), U.S.
- Pioneer High School (San Jose, California), U.S.
- Pioneer High School (Whittier, California), U.S.
- Pioneer Junior College, Singapore
- Pioneer-Pleasant Vale Schools, (Garfield County, Oklahoma) U.S.

== Ships ==
- HMS Pioneer, several Royal Navy ships, 1800s
- Pioneer (sidewheeler), one of the first steamboats in California, U.S., 1849
- Pioneer (1863 paddle steamer), New Zealand gunboat, 1863
- PS Pioneer (1905)
- Pioneer (submarine), built for the American Civil War, 1861
- Pioneer (schooner), ship at the South Street Seaport Museum in New York City, U.S., 1885
- MV Pioneer
- USS Pioneer, several U.S. Navy ships, 1800s – 1900s
- USC&GS Pioneer, several U.S. Coast and Geodetic Survey ships, 1900s
- P&O Pioneer, a British hybrid power seagoing ferry, introduced on the Dover–Calais route, 2023
- SS Pioneer, several steamships

== Sports ==
- London Greenhouse Pioneers, an English basketball team
- Pioneer Bowl (disambiguation), American college football games
- Pioneer Football League, a college conference
- Pioneer League (baseball), a minor league
- Pioneer Race Course, a former San Francisco horse racing course
- Sacred Heart Pioneers, the athletic teams of the Sacred Heart University

== Other ==
- Pioneer program, of U.S. unmanned space missions 1958–1978
- Pioneer species, colonizing new environment
- Pioneering (Scouting)
- Pioneer, U.S. Secret Service code name for Kamala Harris
- Young Pioneers (disambiguation)
- Pioneer, breed of slower-growing chickens by defunct Cooks Venture

== See also ==
- Pioneer Award (disambiguation)
- Pioneer Club (disambiguation)
- Pioneer Days (disambiguation)
- Pioneer League (disambiguation)
- Pioneer Township (disambiguation)
- Pionier (disambiguation)
- Pioner (disambiguation)
