= Kaituozhe =

Kaituozhe (simplified Chinese: 开拓者; traditional Chinese: 開拓者; pinyin: kāi tuò zhě; lit. 'pioneer') may refer to:

- Kaituozhe (rocket family), the KT series of space launch vehicles built by China Aerospace Science and Technology Corporation (CASC)

== See also ==
- Pioneer (disambiguation)
- Kuaizhou
