= Pionier =

Pionier may refer to:

- PIONIER, the Polish academic network
- Pionier, the German-language paper published by Karl Heinzen
- PIONIER (VLTI), an instrument at the VLTI astronomical observatory
- "Pioniere", combat engineering battalions in some German speaking countries

== See also ==
- Pioneer (disambiguation)
