= Pioneer Monument =

Pioneer Monument or Pioneer Memorial may refer to:

in Canada

- Pioneer Monument Obelisk (Montreal), Quebec

in the United States

- Pioneer Monument (San Francisco), California
- Pioneer Memorial (Denver, Colorado) or Pioneer Monument (Denver, Colorado), in the Civic Center Historic District (Denver, Colorado) (in the Denver Civic Center)
- Pioneer Memorial (Houston), Texas
- Pioneer Monument at Donner Memorial State Park, California
- Pioneer Monument (Salt Lake City), Utah
- This Is the Place Monument in Salt Lake City, Utah

== See also ==
- Pioneer (disambiguation), for sculptures named "The Pioneer" or "Pioneer"
