= USS Pioneer =

USS Pioneer may refer to:

- USS Pioneer (1836), a nineteenth-century barque.
- USS Pioneer (MSF-105), a World War II minesweeper commissioned in 1942 and sold to Mexico in 1973 as Leandro Valle
- USS Pioneer (MCM-9), is an Avenger-class mine countermeasures ship currently in service.

== See also ==
- USC&GS Pioneer, the name of more than one ship of the United States Coast and Geodetic Survey.
