= Pioner =

Pioner may refer to:

== Places ==
- Pioner, Amur Oblast, Russia
- Pioner, Penza Oblast, a village (selo) in Penza Oblast, Russia
- Pioner Truda, Altai Krai, Russia
- Pioner, Republic of Bashkortostan, a village in the Republic of Bashkortostan, Russia
- Pioner, a former urban-type settlement in Kemerovo Oblast, Russia; since 2004—a part of the city of Kemerovo

== Other ==
- Josef Pioner, an Italian luger who competed in the late 1970s
- RSD-10 Pioneer, a Soviet medium-range ballistic missile
- Pioner (video game)
