= Pioneer (Pioneer album) =

Studio album by Pioneer
- Released: January 24, 2012
- Genre: Christian rock, heartland rock, indie rock
- Length: 37:42
- Label: Slospeak

Pioneer is the first studio album by Pioneer. Slospeak Records released the album on January 24, 2012.

== Critical reception ==
Professional ratings
Review scores
Source	Rating
HM Magazine	4/5 stars
Indie Vision Music	4/5 stars
Jesus Freak Hideout	4/5 stars
New Release Tuesday	3.5/5 stars

Dr. Tony Shore, signaling in a four star review from HM, write, "just take a listen to this fun, powerful release from a great band with a new name." Awarding the album four stars from Jesus Freak Hideout, Nathaniel Schexnayder writes, "it spins remarkably well for a new band." Scott Fryberger, rating the album four stars for Jesus Freak Hideout, states, "Pioneer is a good dose of alternative rock with some pop punk qualities." Giving the album three and a half stars at New Release Tuesday, Jonathan J. Francesco describes, "Pioneer offers a thoughtful and pleasant soft rock release". Keith Settles, indicating in a four star review by Indie Vision Music, says, "Pioneer has released an above average full length album thanks to solid production and good song writing."

== Track listing ==
Pioneer
No.	Title	Length
1.	"Clarity"	0:57
2.	"Lights"	3:22
3.	"Treason"	3:37
4.	"Dreams"	3:23
5.	"Whatever It Takes"	3:41
6.	"Mantua"	1:00
7.	"Reaching"	4:35
8.	"Long Way Home"	3:20
9.	"Better Days"	3:11
10.	"Catharsis"	3:59
11.	"Coming of Age"	3:15
12.	"King in Rags"	3:32
Total length:		37:42
