= Pioneer League =

Pioneer League may refer to:

- Pioneer Football League, American non-scholarship NCAA Division I Football Championship Subdivision conference
- Pioneer Baseball League, minor league baseball league
- Pioneer League (California), a high-school athletic conference in South Bay, Los Angeles, California, U.S.
