= Pioneer Township =

Pioneer Township may refer to:

- Pioneer Township, Cedar County, Iowa
- Pioneer Township, Graham County, Kansas
- Pioneer Township, Rice County, Kansas
- Pioneer Township, Rush County, Kansas, in Rush County, Kansas
- Pioneer Township, Michigan
- Pioneer Township, Barry County, Missouri
- Pioneer Township, Faulk County, South Dakota, in Faulk County, South Dakota
