= Pioneer Club =

Pioneer Club may refer to:

- Las Vegas Pioneer Club, a former casino in Las Vegas, Nevada
- Pioneer Hotel & Gambling Hall, a former casino in Laughlin, Nevada
- Delta Rho Upsilon, a local Greek fraternity at Carroll University in Waukesha, Wisconsin
- Pioneer Club (women's club), a progressive women's club established in 1892 in London
- Pioneer Club (Oklahoma), listed on the NRHP in Oklahoma
- Pioneer Clubs - an Evangelical Christian co-ed children's ministry
