= Pioner (video game) =

Upcoming video game

- Developer: GFAGames
- Publisher: GFAGames
- Engine: Unreal Engine 4
- Platforms: Linux; Windows; PlayStation 5; Xbox Series X/S
- Release: Linux, Windows; December 16, 2025 (early access)
- Genre: First-person shooter
- Modes: Single-player, multiplayer

Pioner (stylized in all caps) is an upcoming open-world first-person shooter video game developed by GFAGames. The game was released into early access via Steam for Linux and Windows on December 16, 2025, with versions for PlayStation 5 and Xbox Series X/S planned at a later date. The game is set on a post-apocalyptic Soviet-era island.

== Development ==
The game has been developed by the studio GFAGames since its founding in 2021. As of 2023, 100 people were involved in the creation of Pioner. The game was developed with Unreal Engine 4.

Beta testing is planned before the game's release. In November 2021, Tencent acquired a minority stake in GFAGames, and a month later the co-owner of GFAGames announced that the game would be released in 2022. The release was eventually delayed indefinitely.

A year later, in November 2024, GFA Games began accepting applications for the game's closed beta testing. As of January 2025, the game was wishlisted by over 100,000 Steam users.

Pioner will be distributed on a buy-to-play model.

On November 13, 2026 it was announced that Pioner will shutdown due to a lack of funding.

== Gameplay ==
Pioner is a first-person shooter with elements of role-playing and online multiplayer. The game will be implemented in PvE and PvP modes. In addition, the events taking place in the game world will be synchronized with real time, meaning patrols and bandits will be less frequent in the nighttime, and during the daytime, one can hunt animals or mutants.

The game will feature story tasks and faction tasks. The user will be able to interact with various factions, building relationships with them and increasing their level of loyalty. The amount of bonuses received will depend on the level of loyalty. Some tasks will be located in closed locations, which can be accessed alone or in a group. Fighting against real players will take place in special arenas. A large part of the island is designated for this purpose, which is called "empty lands". The entire game world of Pioner is about 50 square kilometers, not including dungeons. Precise details of the game world will not be disclosed by the developers until the final release.

The protagonist must eat and rest in order to maintain strength. The game will indicate the rating and rarity of equipment, accuracy, and weapon damage. Weapons will be produced from available means, artifacts, or energy of anomalies with the help of a machine or workbench.

== Plot ==
The game is set on an isolated Soviet-era island with a high-radiation environment, which was previously used to maintain a system of bunkers and laboratories. The island is inhabited by wild animals, mutants, and anomalies.

Tartarus Island is divided into zones offering both single-player and multiplayer content. The PvP zone has rules prohibiting camping and hunting players who play alone.

The developers say that after the game's release there will be endgame content and additional plot development.

== Reception ==
Various reviewers have noted similarities to S.T.A.L.K.E.R.: Call of Pripyat and Escape from Tarkov.
