= Pioneer Bowl =

Pioneer Bowl may refer to one of the following college football bowl games:

- Pioneer Bowl (1971–1982), played in Wichita Falls, Texas, first as an NCAA College Division regional bowl game, then as a Division II postseason game, and finally as the championship game for Division I-AA (today's FCS)
- Pioneer Bowl (HBCU), played at five different cities in the American South between 1997 and 2012, between teams from the Central Intercollegiate Athletic Conference (CIAA) and Southern Intercollegiate Athletic Conference (SIAC)
- Pioneer Bowl, a 1976 regular-season game between Grambling State and Morgan State played in Tokyo, Japan—see List of college football games played outside the United States
- Several editions of the Las Vegas Bowl sponsored by Pioneer Corporation and officially known as the Pioneer Purevision Las Vegas Bowl (2004–2006) and Pioneer Las Vegas Bowl (2007–2008)

== Other uses ==
- Pioneer Bowl, a bowling alley located in Pioneertown, California, U.S.
