= Young Pioneers =

Young Pioneers may refer to:

== Media ==
- Young Pioneers (novel), a short novel by Rose Wilder Lane
  - Young Pioneers (film), a 1976 American made-for-television Western film
  - The Young Pioneers (miniseries), a three-episode ABC western television series
- (Young) Pioneers, an American folk punk band from Richmond, Virginia

== Organizations ==
- Malawi Young Pioneers, the paramilitary wing of the Malawi Congress Party
- Pioneer movement, an organization for children operated by a communist party
  - Young Pioneers (Soviet Union), a mass youth organization of the Soviet Union for children
  - Young Pioneers of America, a children's organization affiliated with the Communist Party USA
  - Young Pioneers of China, a mass youth organization for children aged six to fourteen in the People's Republic of China
  - Young Pioneers, a branch of the Ernst Thälmann Pioneer Organisation in East Germany.
  - Young Pioneers (Mali)
