= Pioneer Award =

Pioneer Award may refer to:

- EFF Pioneer Award, presented by the Electronic Frontier Foundation
- SFRA Pioneer Award, presented by the Science Fiction Research Association
- NIH Director's Pioneer Award, presented by the National Institutes of Health
- GLAAD Pioneer Award, presented by the Gay & Lesbian Alliance Against Defamation
- INCOSE Pioneer Award, presented by the International Council on Systems Engineering
- The Pioneer Award by the International Game Developers Association
- Pioneer Award, presented by the Rhythm and Blues Foundation
- Pioneer Award in Nanotechnology
- Pioneer Award (Aviation), presented by the IEEE Aerospace and Electronic Systems Society.
