= Pioneer Living History Museum =

Coordinates: 33°49′9.4074″N 112°08′39.141″W

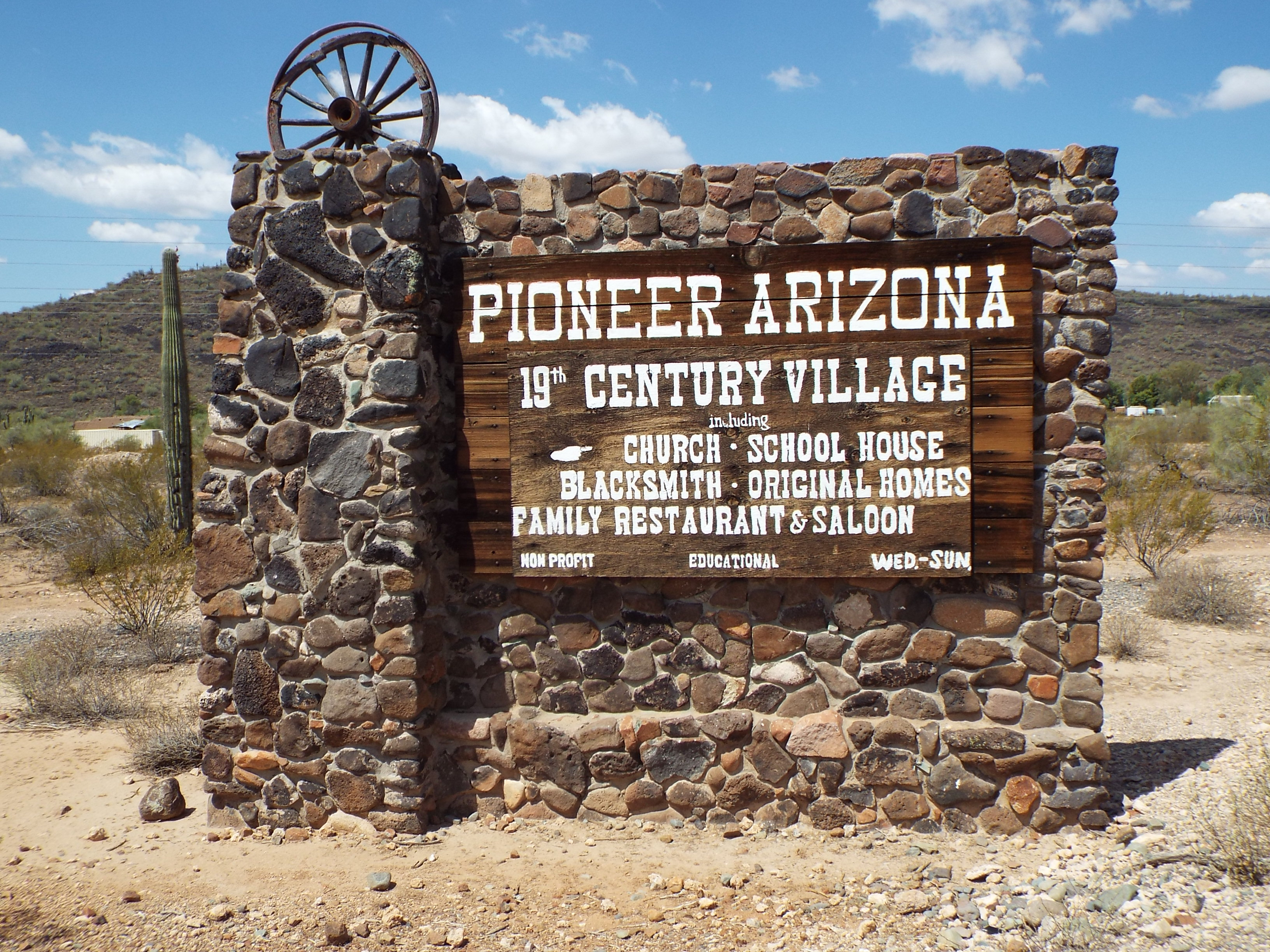
- Pioneer Living History Museum
- Established: 1969
- Location: 3901 W. Pioneer Road; Phoenix, Arizona
- Type: Living museum
- Website: Pioneer Living History Museum

The Pioneer Living History Museum is located at 3901 W. Pioneer Road in Phoenix, Arizona. The museum, also known as Pioneer Arizona, has 30 historic original and reconstructed buildings from the 1880s and early 1900s on its 90-acre property.

== History ==
In 1956, a group of Arizona history enthusiasts became concerned about the razing and demolition of historical buildings in the state Arizona as a result of new construction by land developers. This group formed the "Pioneer Arizona Foundation, Inc. Among the notable founders of the foundation were former Governor Paul Fannin, Senator Barry Goldwater, Senator Carl Hayden, and Wesley Bolin.

The main goal of the foundation was to save some of the historical buildings that were built between the years 1870 and 1910. The members of the foundation believed that by saving these buildings and by creating an atmosphere of the era, future generations would benefit by learning about what the early pioneers of the west went through. The foundation purchased 90 acres of land in north Phoenix and the museum was inaugurated in February 15, 1969.

In July 2010, the property where the museum is situated was put up in auction. Great Western Historical LLC outbid Phoenix in the state-land auction. According to one of the new owners, Eric Roles: "The state will not permit private lands, which the museum lands will become once the purchase transaction is closed, to serve water and wastewater from state leased lands." Therefore, the owners ordered the closure of the museum. The city purchased the land and a water line to the museum site was built and the museum was able to continue its operations.

== Buildings and structures ==
There are 10 original historical buildings and structures including the structures of a ranch complex and a farm. The museum also has 15 reconstructed buildings and/or structures.

=== Historic original ===
The original structures are the following:

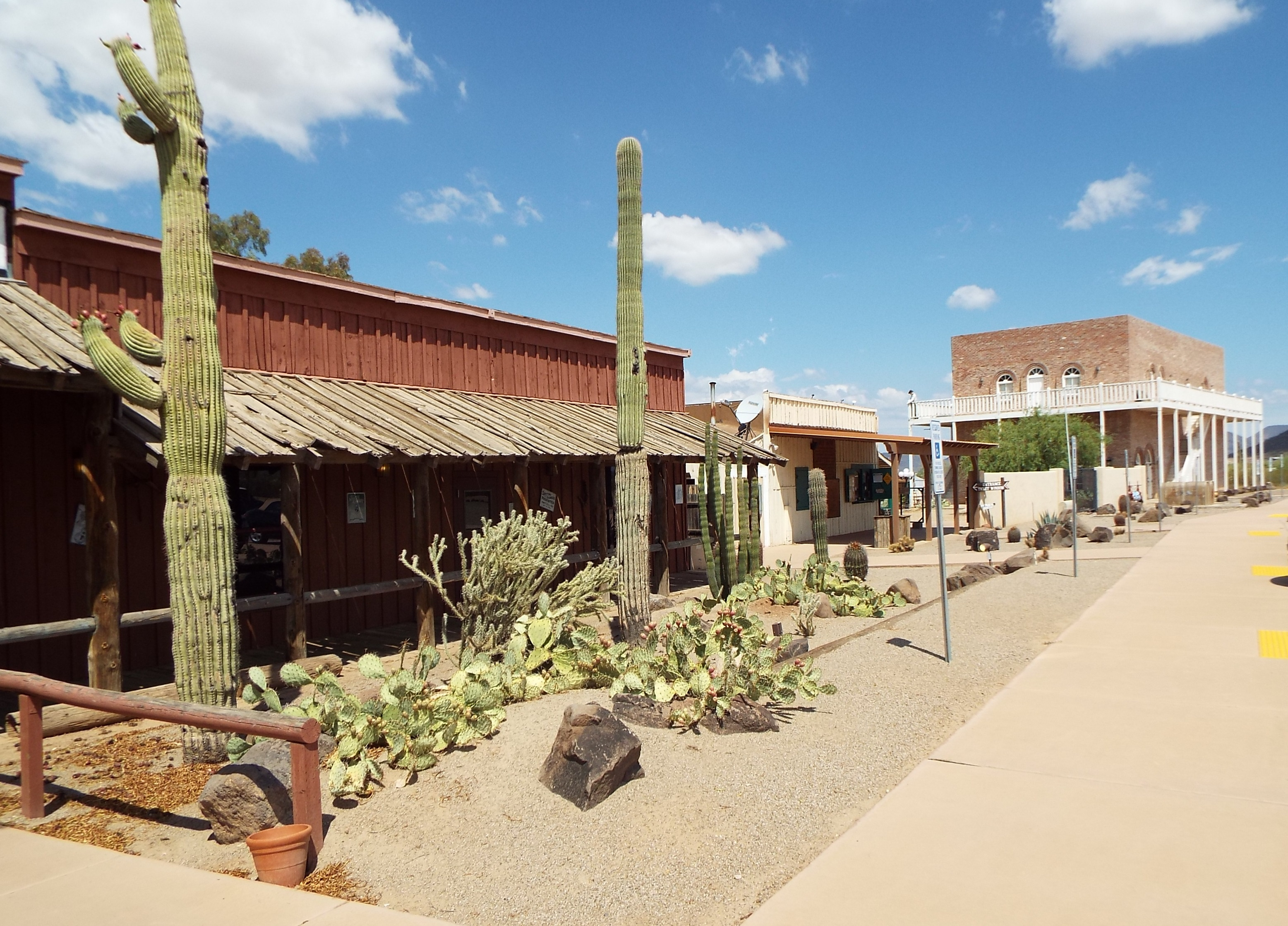
The main entrance to the Pioneer Living History Museum.

- The Sears House a.k.a. the Victorian House which was built in the early 1890s on an acre homestead in Phoenix by John Marion Sears. It was originally located in 4032 N. 7th Street.
- The Ashurst Cabin which was built in 1878 near Prescott. This was the boyhood home of U.S. Senator Henry Fountain Ashurst, the first Arizona senator following statehood. Ashurst served in the Senate from 1912 to 1941. The family cooked their food in the fireplace, however during the summer they did their cooking outside over a campfire. The family lived in the cabin until 1893.
- The Phoenix Bakery building which was built in 1881 and was originally located at 7 West Washington Street in Phoenix. Edward Elsele and Alfred Becker owned the bakery. In 1910, the bakery became the first one in the territory to try out a horseless carriage to deliver their products. In 1929, their sons decided to go wholesale and renamed their product Holsum.
- The Flying “V” Cabin which was built in 1880 and was located in Canyon Creek, Young, Arizona. The cabin has notched gun ports which were used on July 17, 1882, during the Battle of Big Dry Wash, the last Apache War in that area. John D. Tewksbury Sr., of Pleasant Valley War fame lived here with his two wives and children.

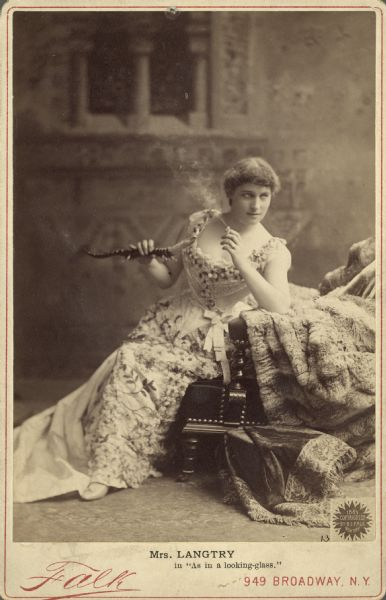
Lillie Langtry in character as the adventuress Lena Despard from the 1887 play As in a Looking-Glass.

- The Gordon School which was built in 1885 in Gordon Canyon which is located east of Payson, Arizona. The school was used to teach the citizens of the area until 1930.
- The Meritt Farm House which was built in 1910 on 100 acres which John and Emma Meritt purchased in Phoenix.
- The Northern Home which was built in 1885 in Newman Canyon close to Flagstaff, Arizona. The house once belonged to Jeff Newman who lived there with his family.
- The Opera House which was built in the early 1870s in Prescott by James Howey. In 1876, the Goldwater family established their first store there. Howey sold the building to Levi Bashford who in 1882, added a stage and converted the place into an opera house. John Drew Jr. and Lillie Langtry performed in the opera house. The building ceased as an opera house in 1899.
- The Teacherage Cabin which was built in 1890 in Pleasant Valley, Payson, Arizona. This was a small cabin which served as a home and incentive for the local teacher.
- The Ranch Complex which was built in 1870 and was located at Gordon Canyon in Payson, Arizona.

=== Historic reconstructed ===
The buildings and structures which were authentically reconstructed are the following:

- The Bandstand is a reconstructed bandstand built in 1881 in Globe, Arizona.
- The Bank is a reconstructed Valley Bank built in 1884 which was located in Phoenix.
- The Blacksmith Shop is the reconstructed Middleton & Pascoe's blacksmith shop which was built c. 1870 in the town of Globe.

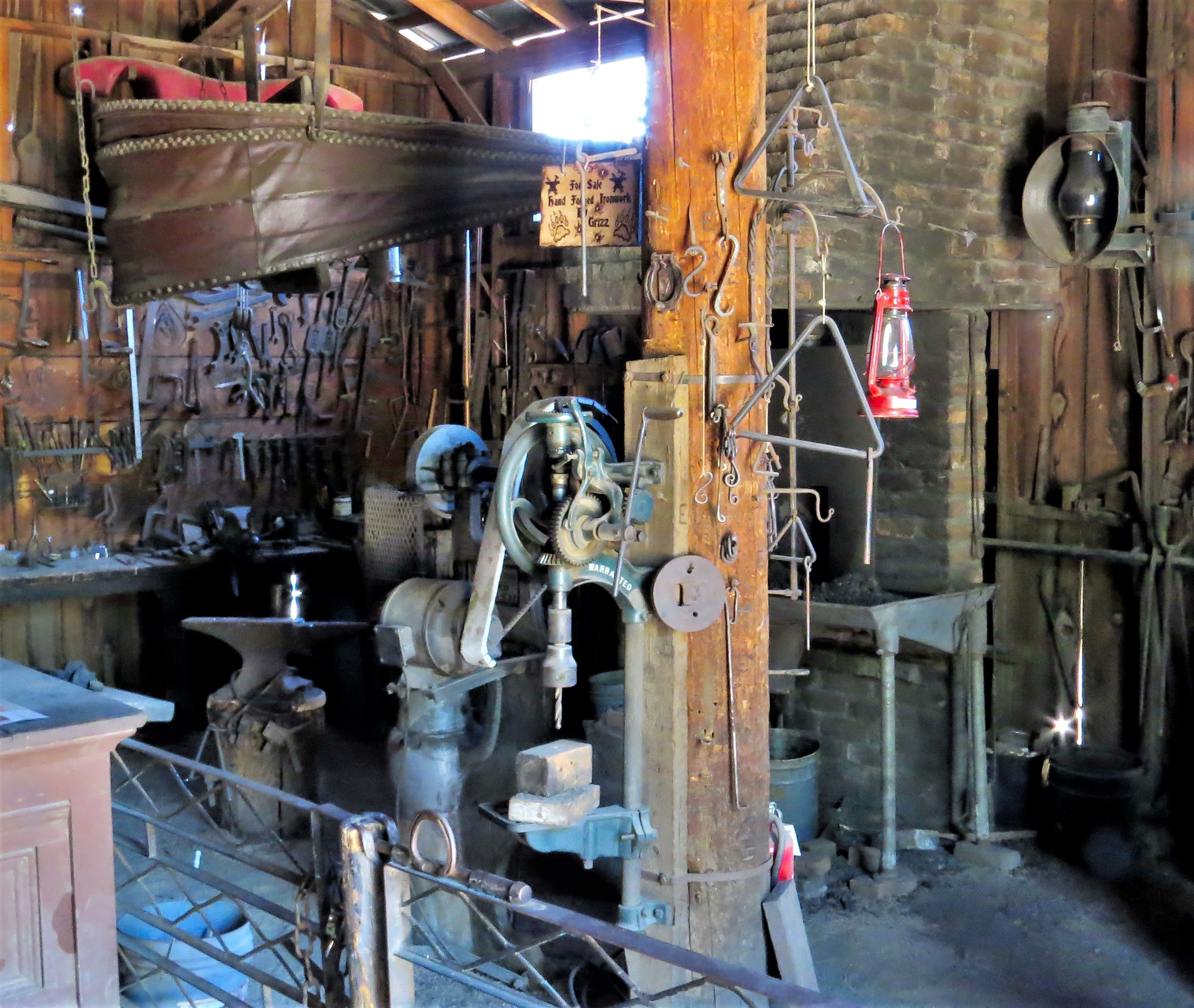
Blacksmith shop - interior

- The Carpenter Shop is a reconstructed shop which serviced Prescott in 1880.
- The Community Church is the reconstruction of the St. Paul's Methodist Episcopal Church which was built in 1880 in the town of Globe.

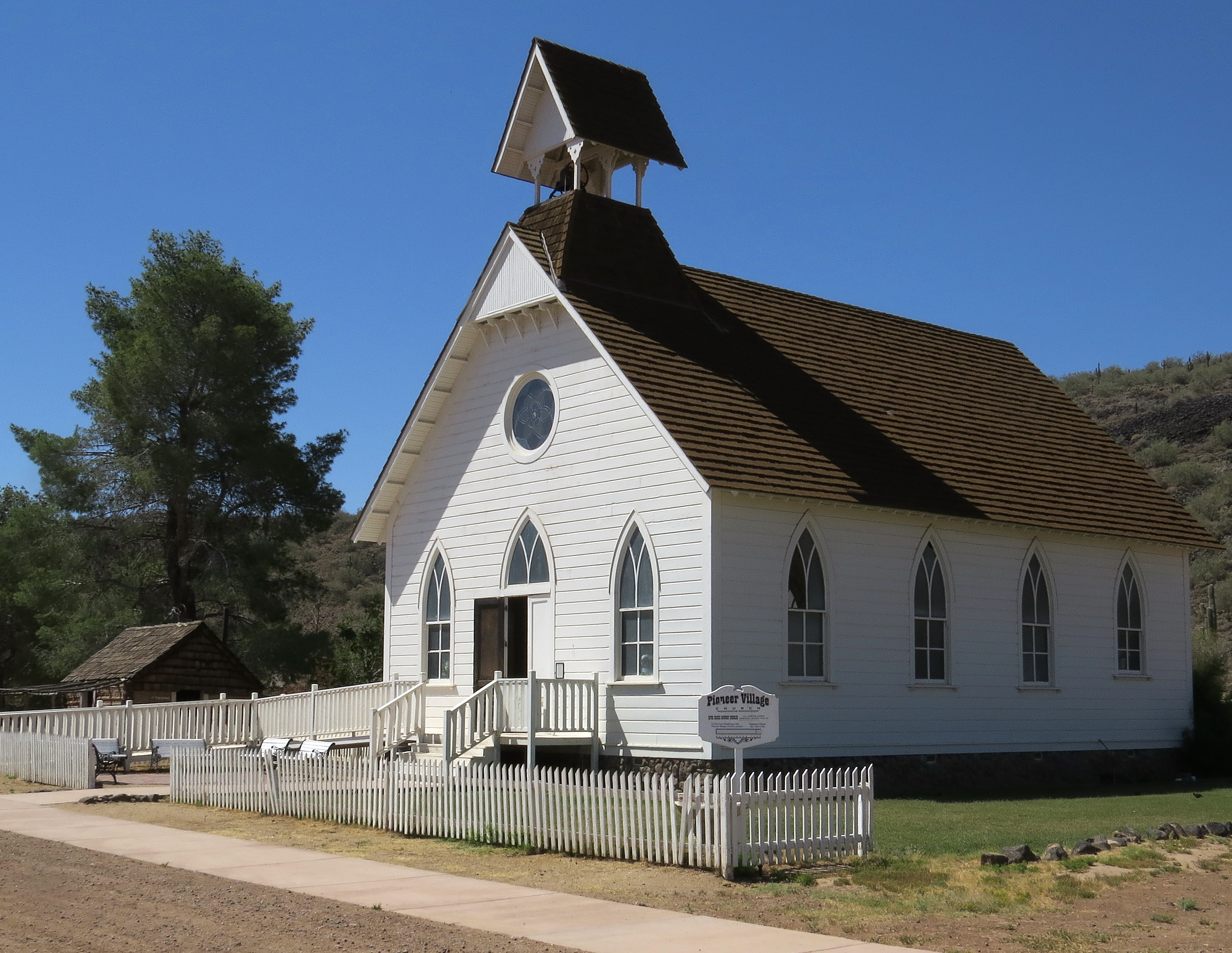
The Community Church

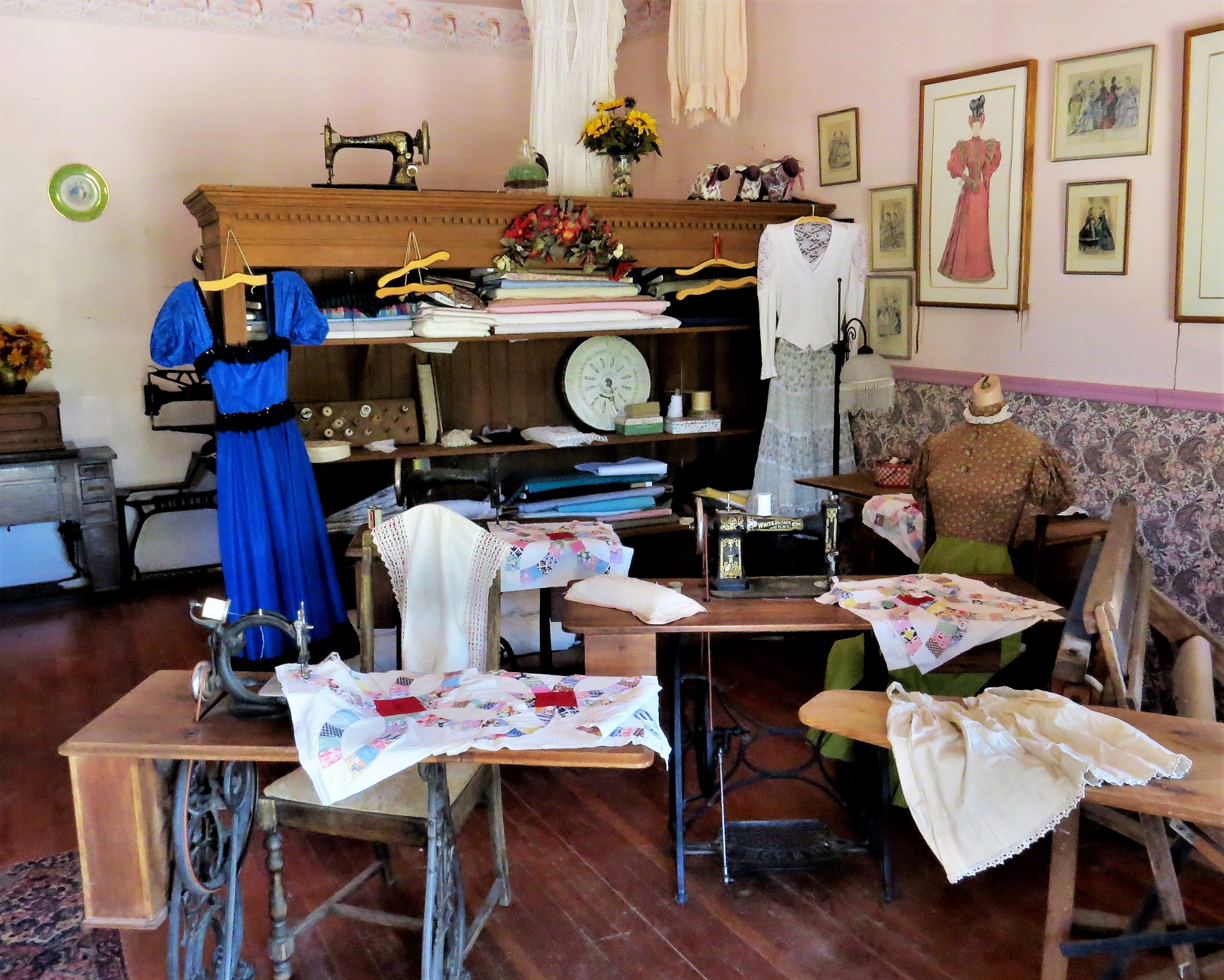
Dress shop - interior

- The Dress Shop is what a ready made clothing shop looked like in Phoenix in 1890.
- The Mercantile is a reconstructed 1890s store which now serves as the museums gift shop.
- The Miner's Cabin is a replica of the type of cabin in the mountains of Clifton which a miner and his family would live in.
- The Print Shop is a reconstructed 1890s Phoenix printing shop.
- The Sheriff's Office is a reconstructed adobe building which was built in 1881 in the town of Globe.
- The Southern House is a reconstructed typical "Anglo" house built in 1858 in Tucson which is located in southern Arizona.
- The Stage Stop is an exact reconstructed duplicate of the Darrell Duppa Stage Station which served the old Phoenix to Wickenburg road from 1871 to 1873. It was operated by Phillip Darrell Duppa, the pioneer credited with giving Phoenix its name.
- The Smith and Dodd's Tonsorial Parler is the reconstruction of a territorial barber shop.
- The Town Ditch is a replica of the type of ditch which was used in the towns founded by the early pioneers. The water carried by the ditches was used for drinking, cooking, washing, etc.

Fort Woods is a replica what a fort looked liked in the west in the 1860s. The first structures built were replicas of those found in Fort McDowell. After other structures were added to the fort, it was decided that the fort be named after Sergeant Brent Woods, a Buffalo Soldier of company B, 9th Cavalry who was awarded the Medal of Honor.

The Town Cemetery is a replica of a common pioneer cemetery. The graves at the time were covered with rocks with the intention of keeping wild animals away. This particular cemetery serves as a memorial to honor some of the volunteers who helped build the museum and who are now deceased. Their names and date of death are craved on the headstones.

== Gallery of the original historic buildings ==
The original historic buildings and structures

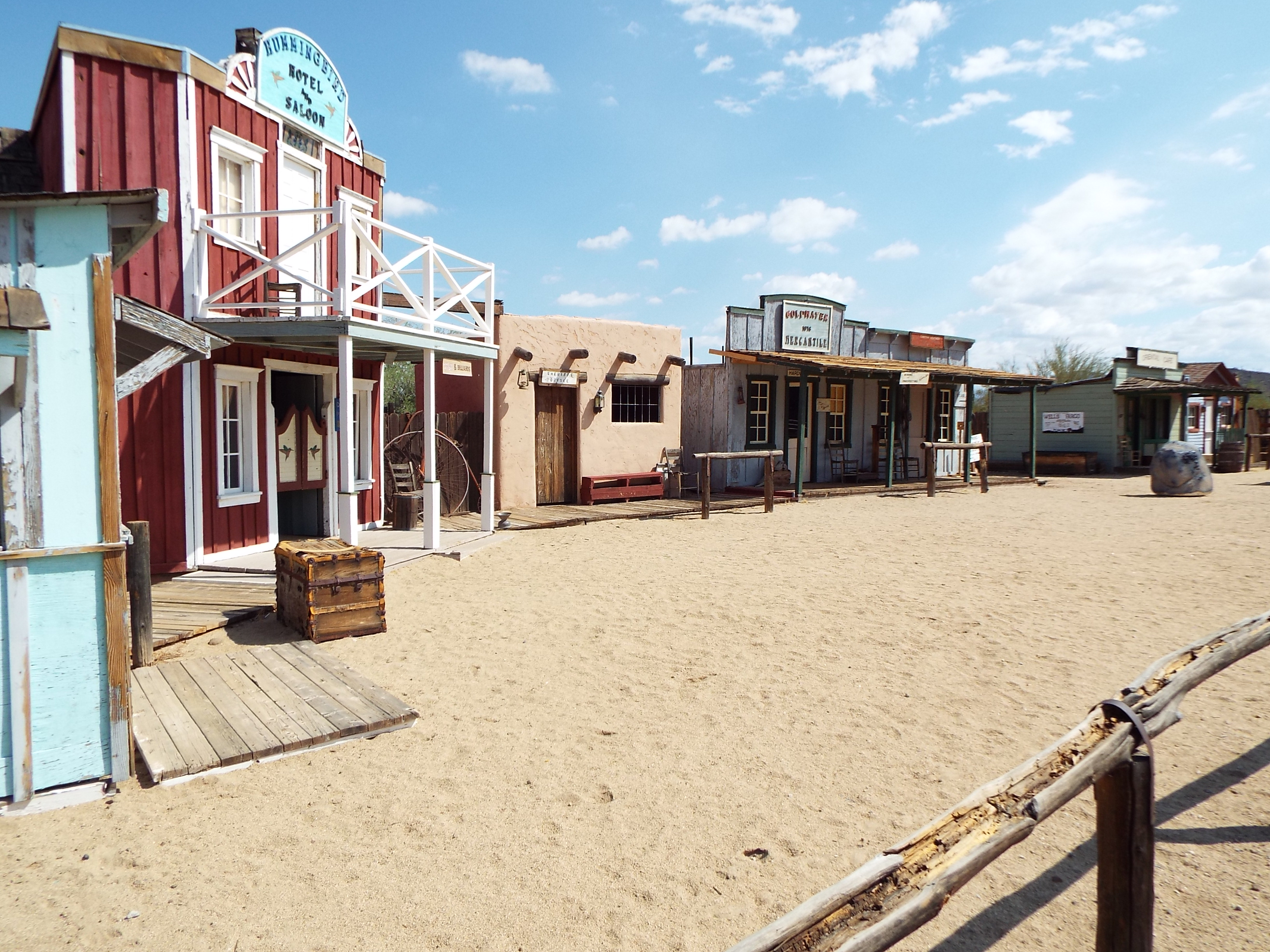
Main Street of the Pioneer Living History Museum.

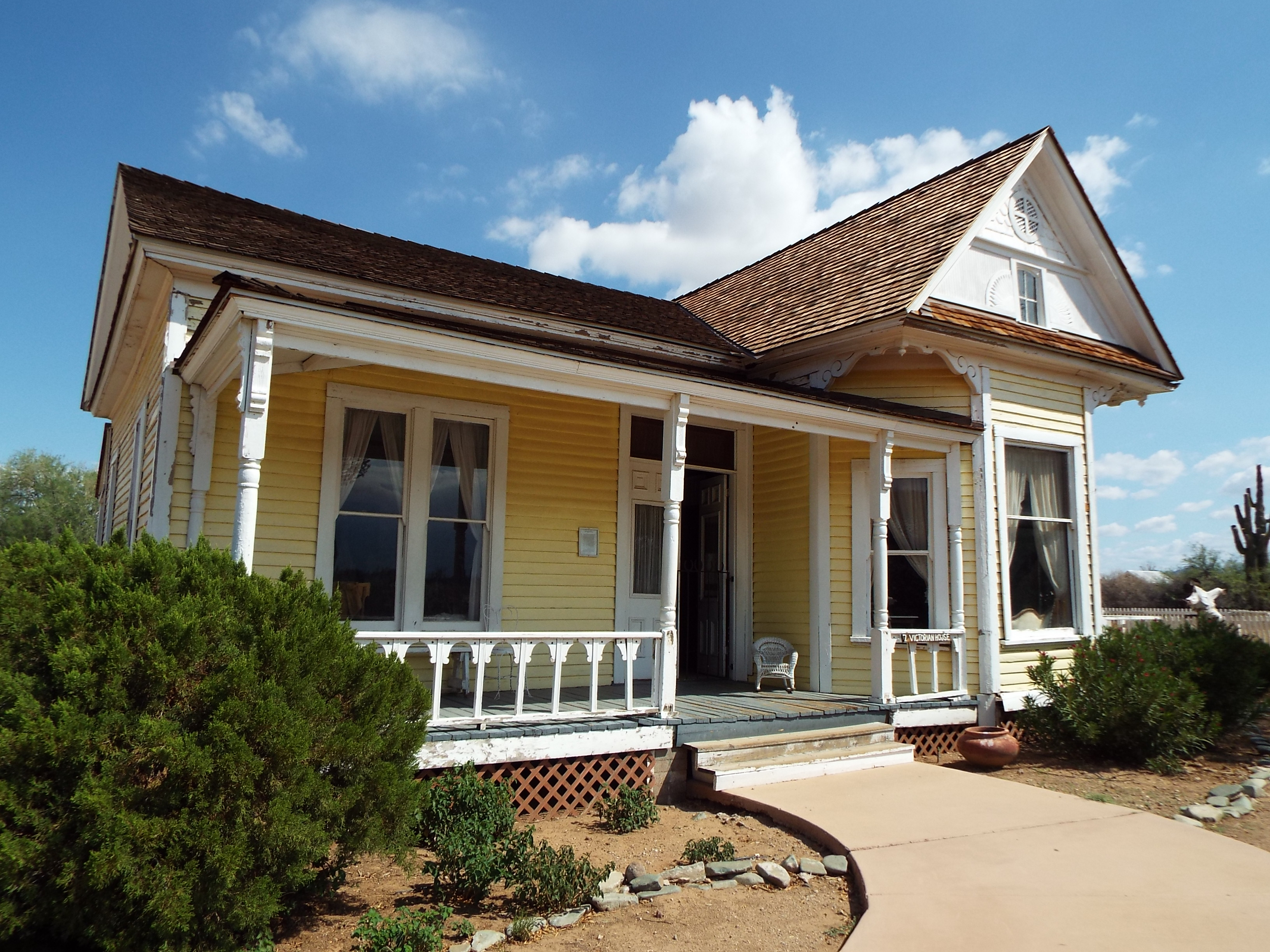
The Sears House a.k.a. the Victorian House.

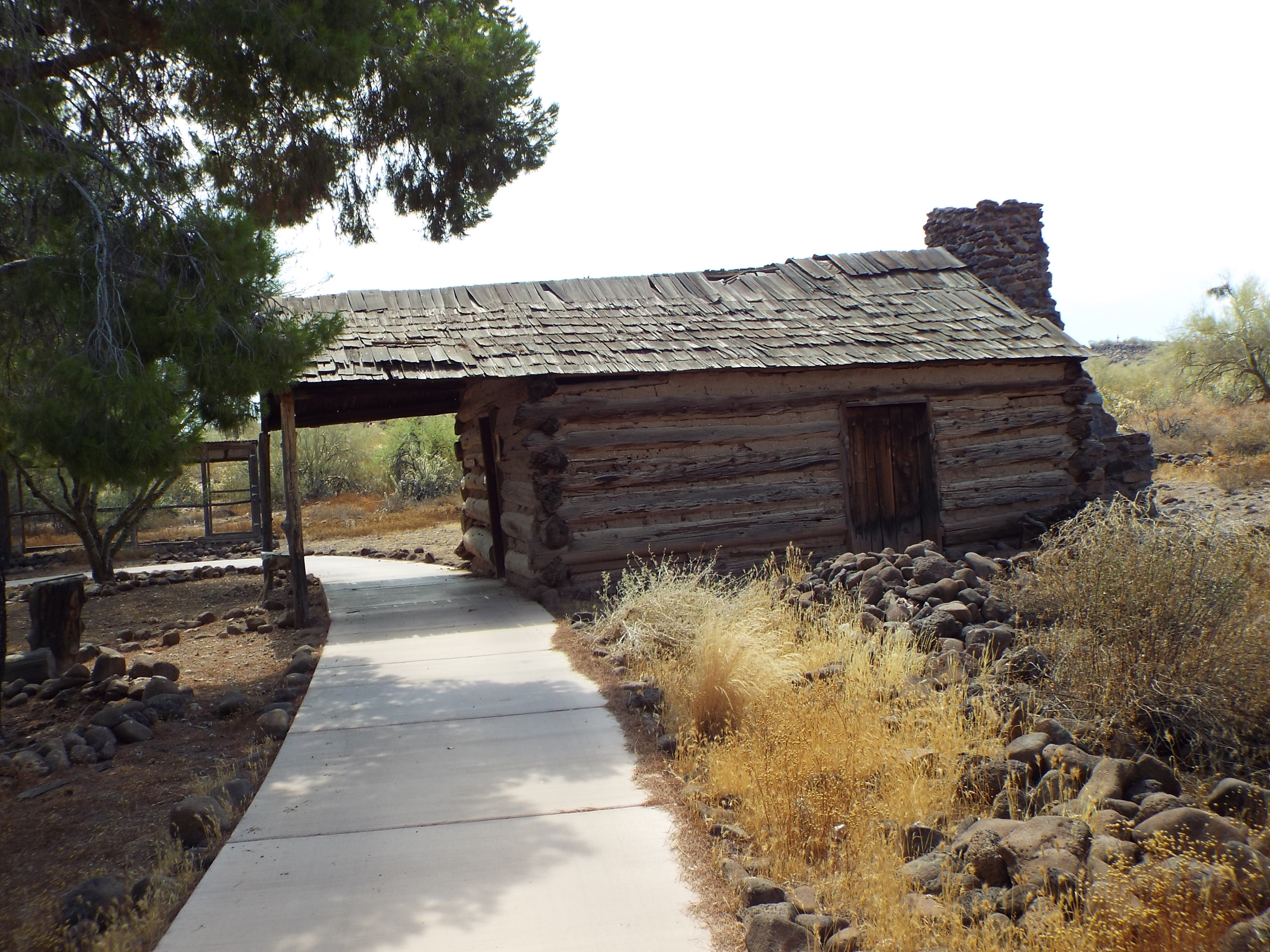
The Ashurst Cabin.

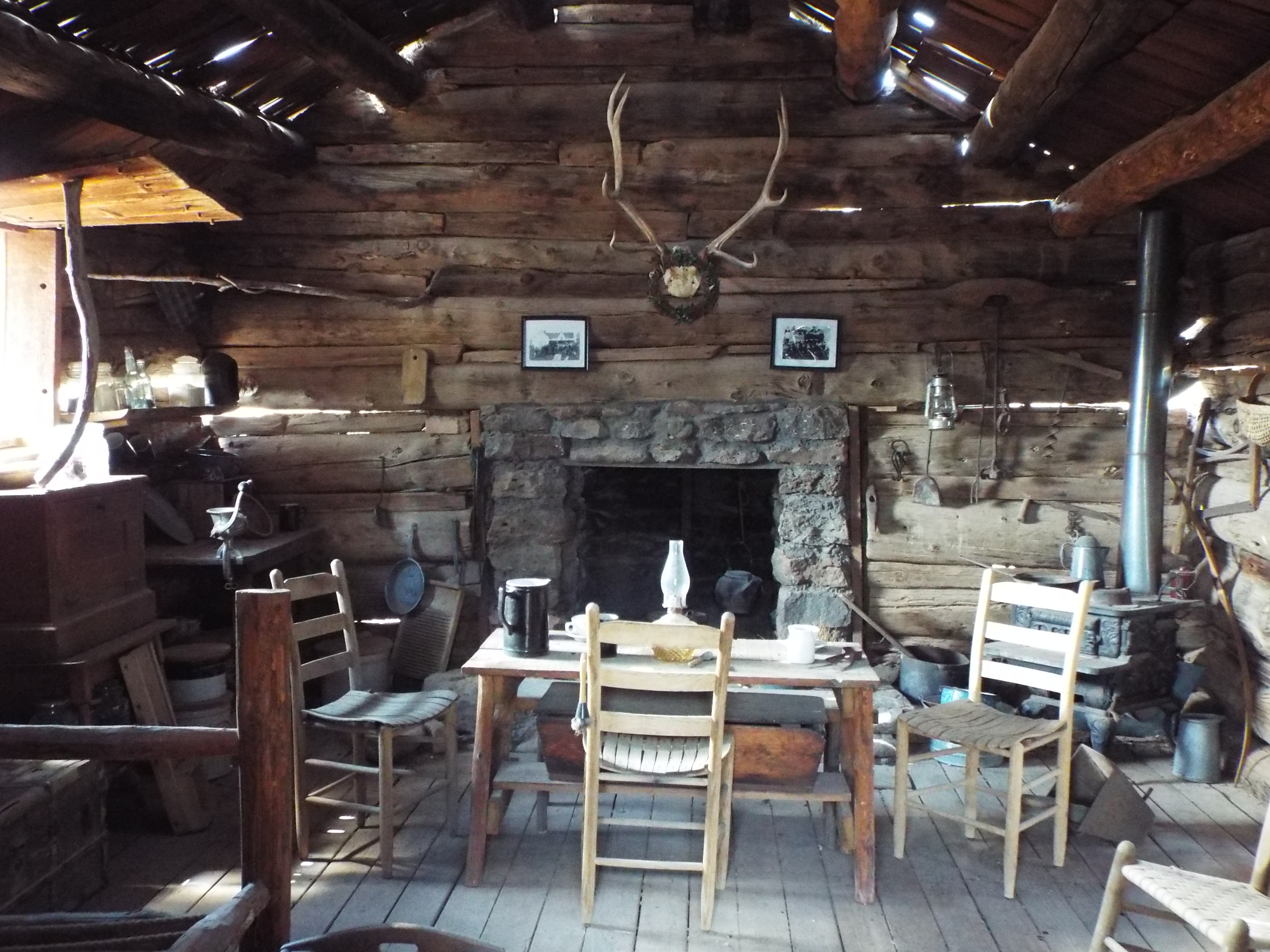
Inside the Ashurst Cabin.

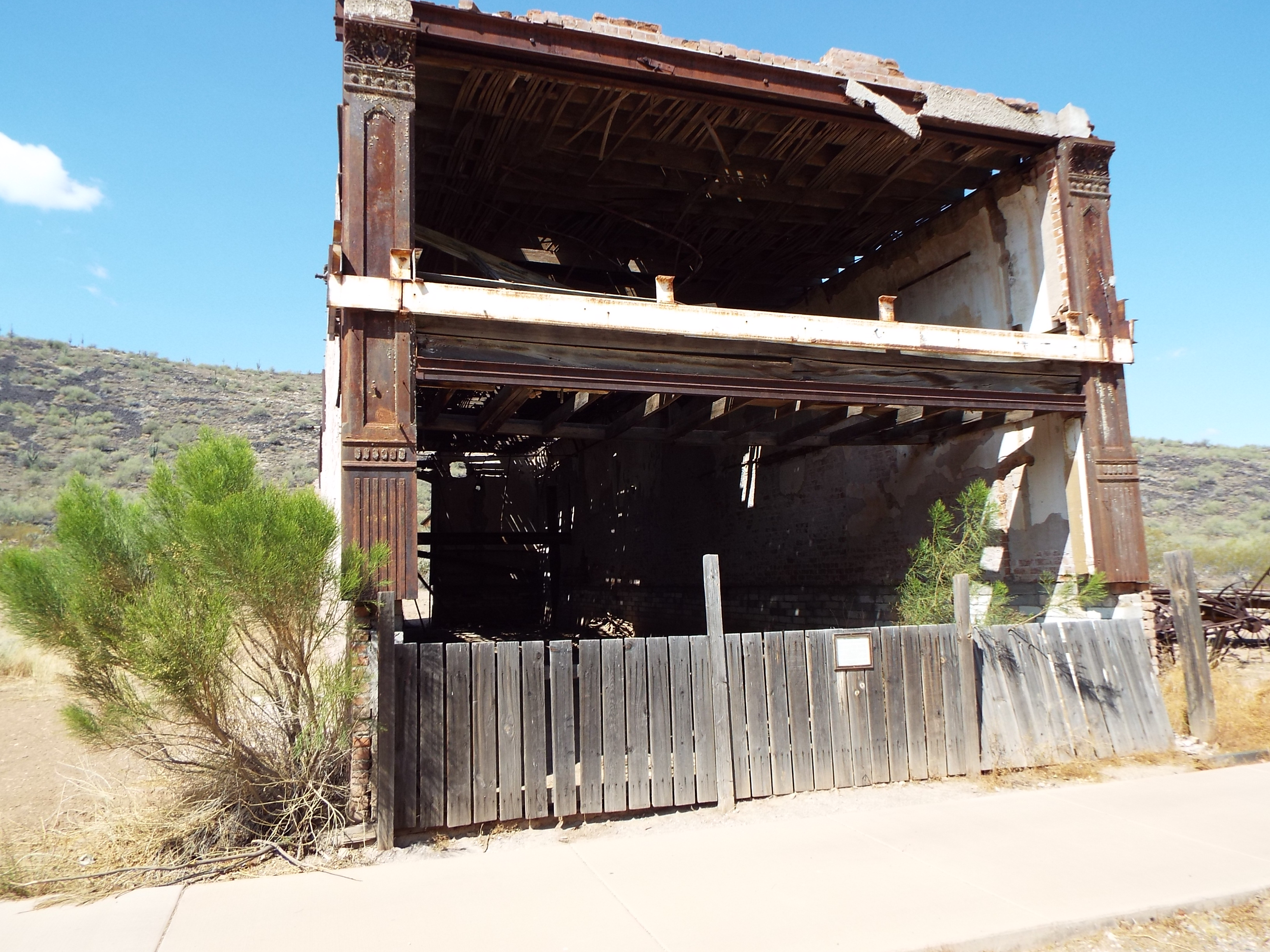
The Phoenix Bakery building.

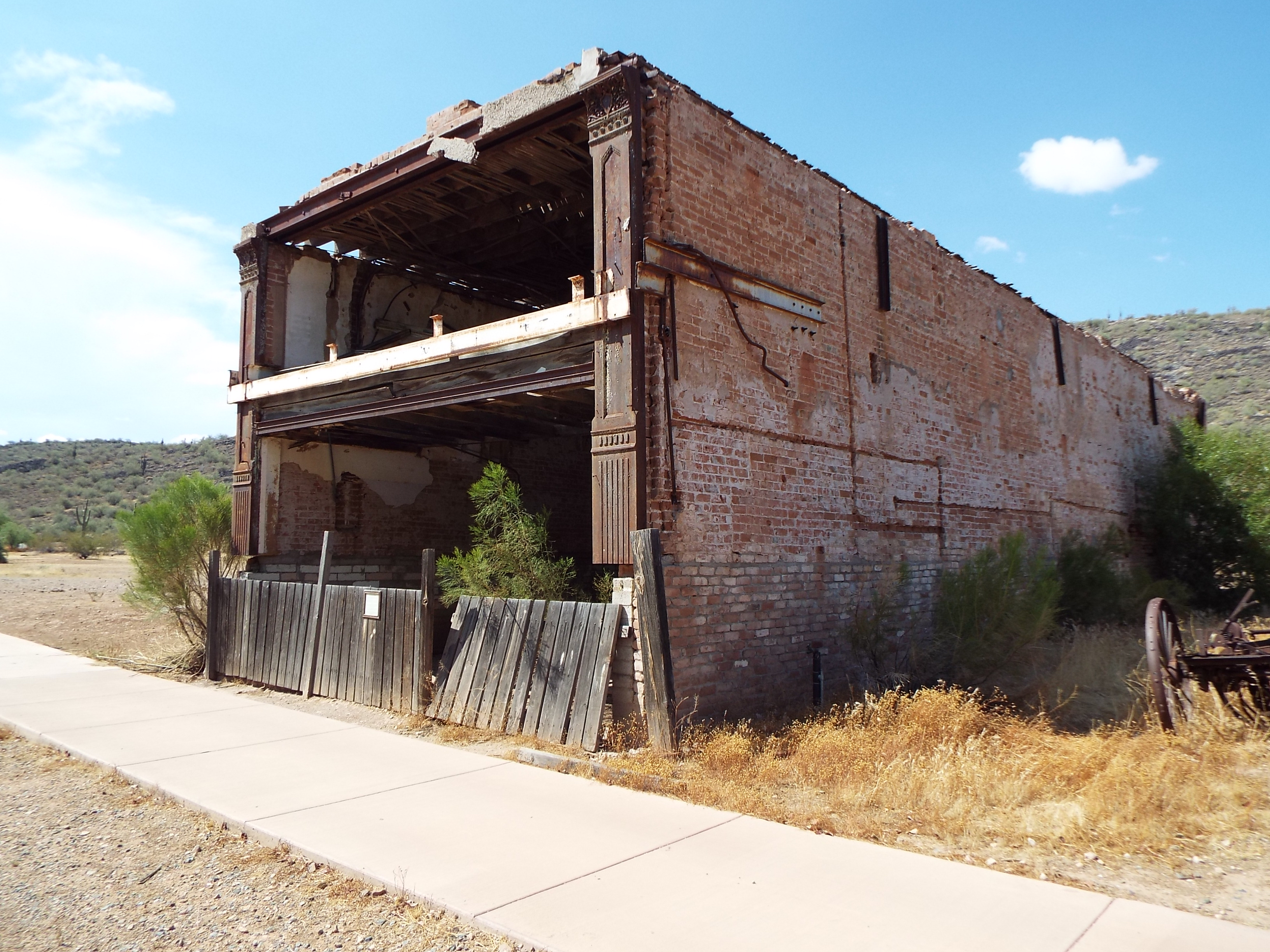
Different view of the shell of the Phoenix Bakery.

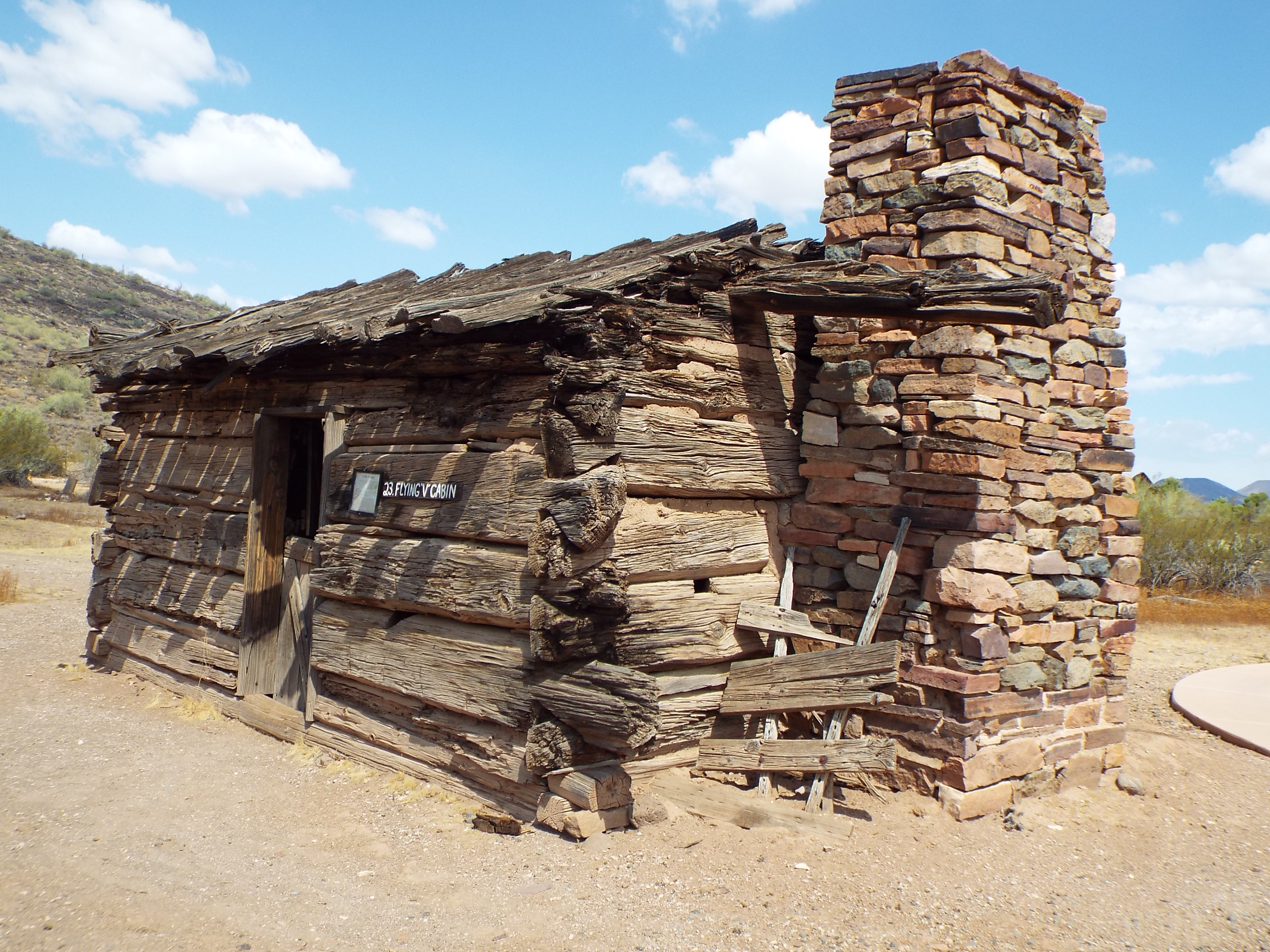
The Flying “V” Cabin.

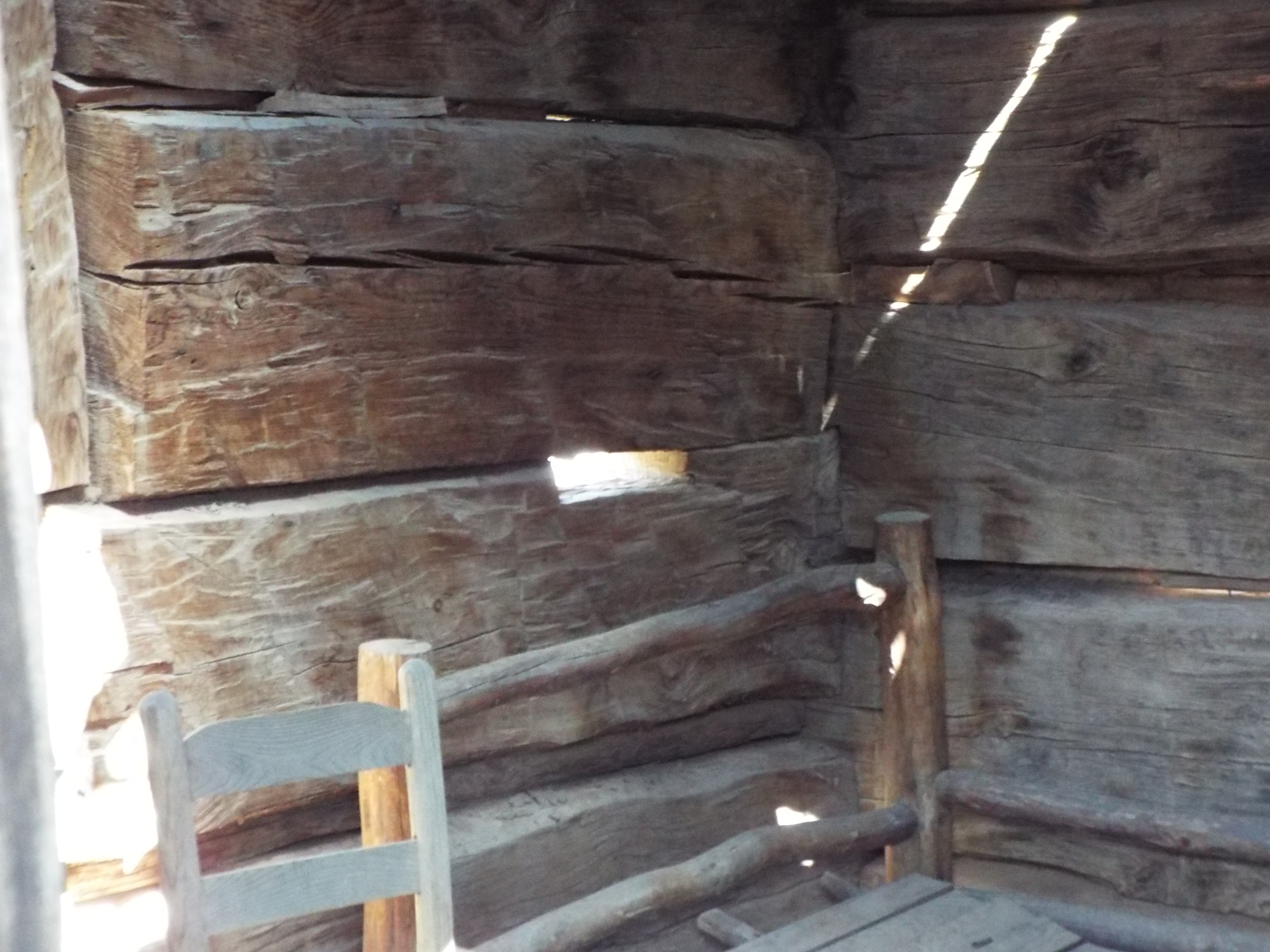
One of the notched gun ports inside the Flying “V” Cabin.

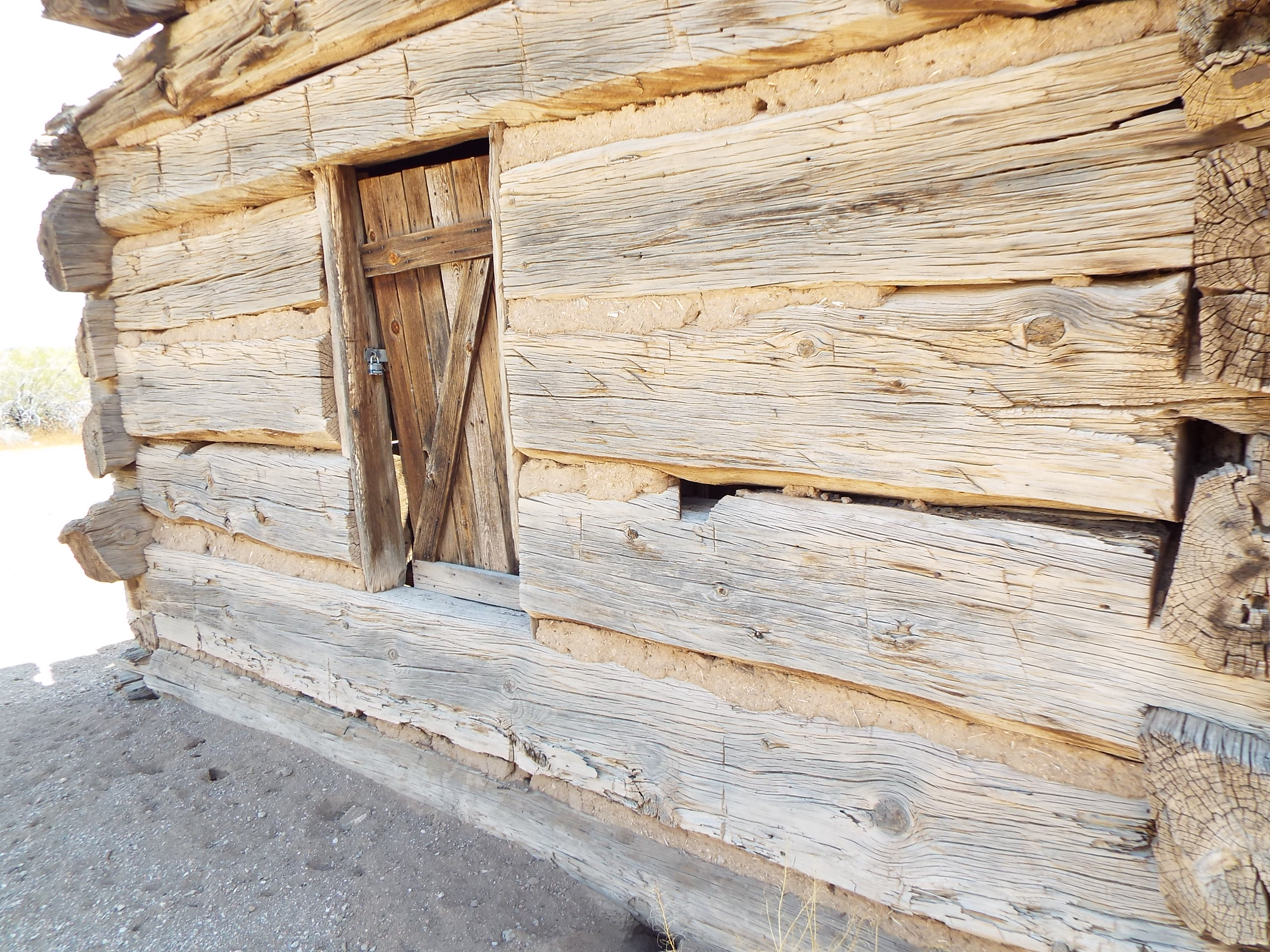
The notched gun ports as seen from the outside of the Flying “V” Cabin.

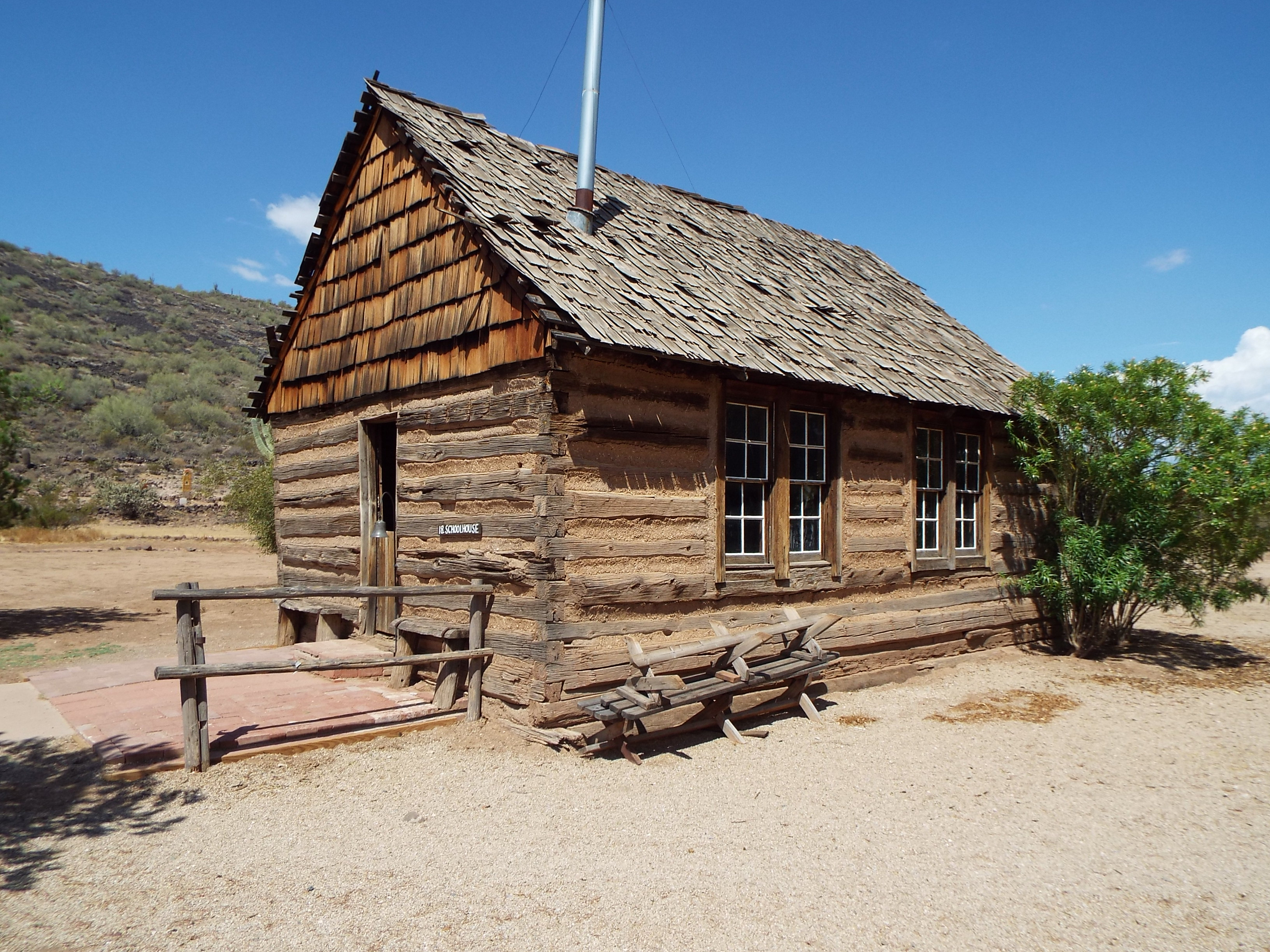
The Gordon School.

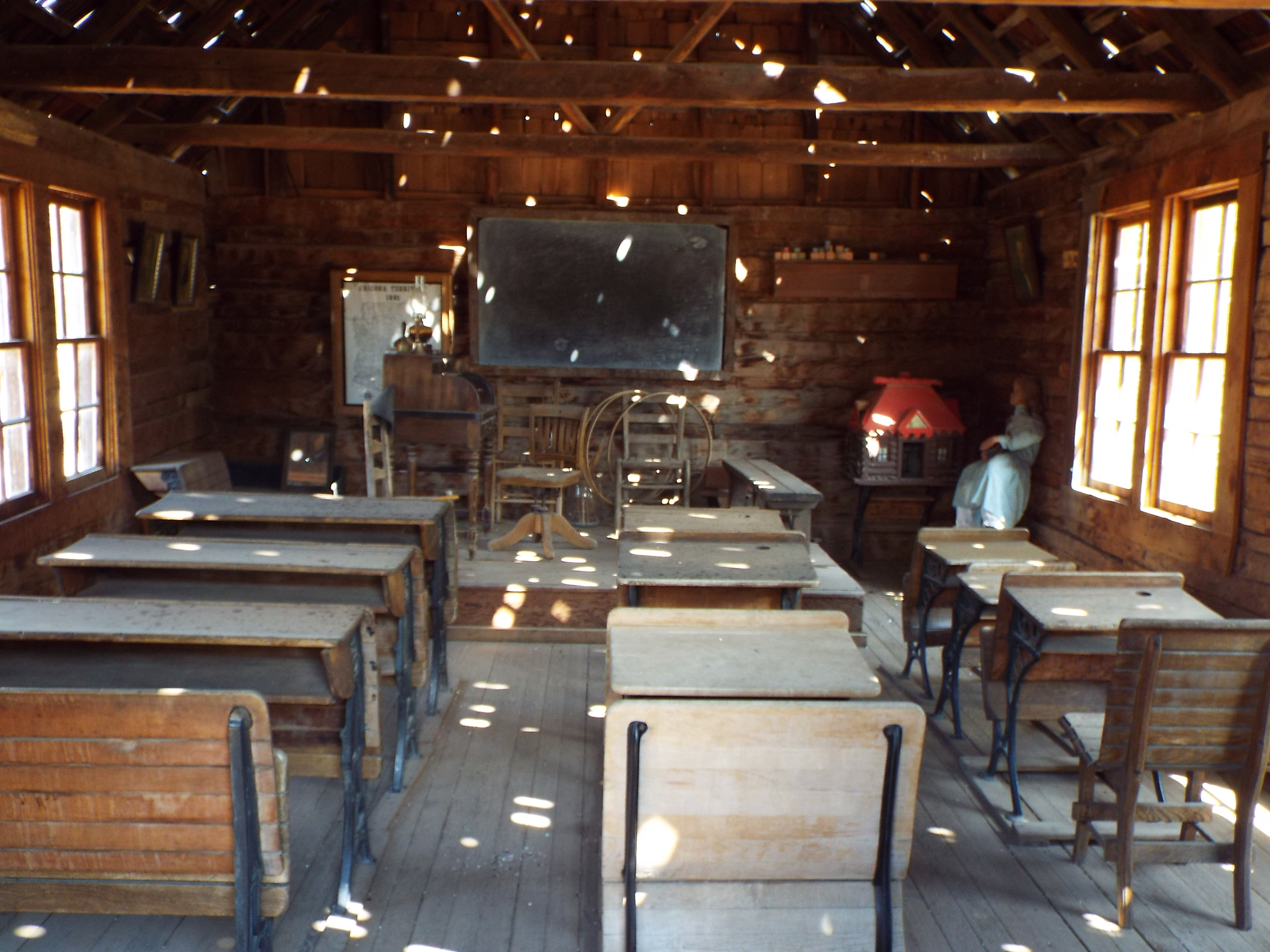
Inside the Gordon School.

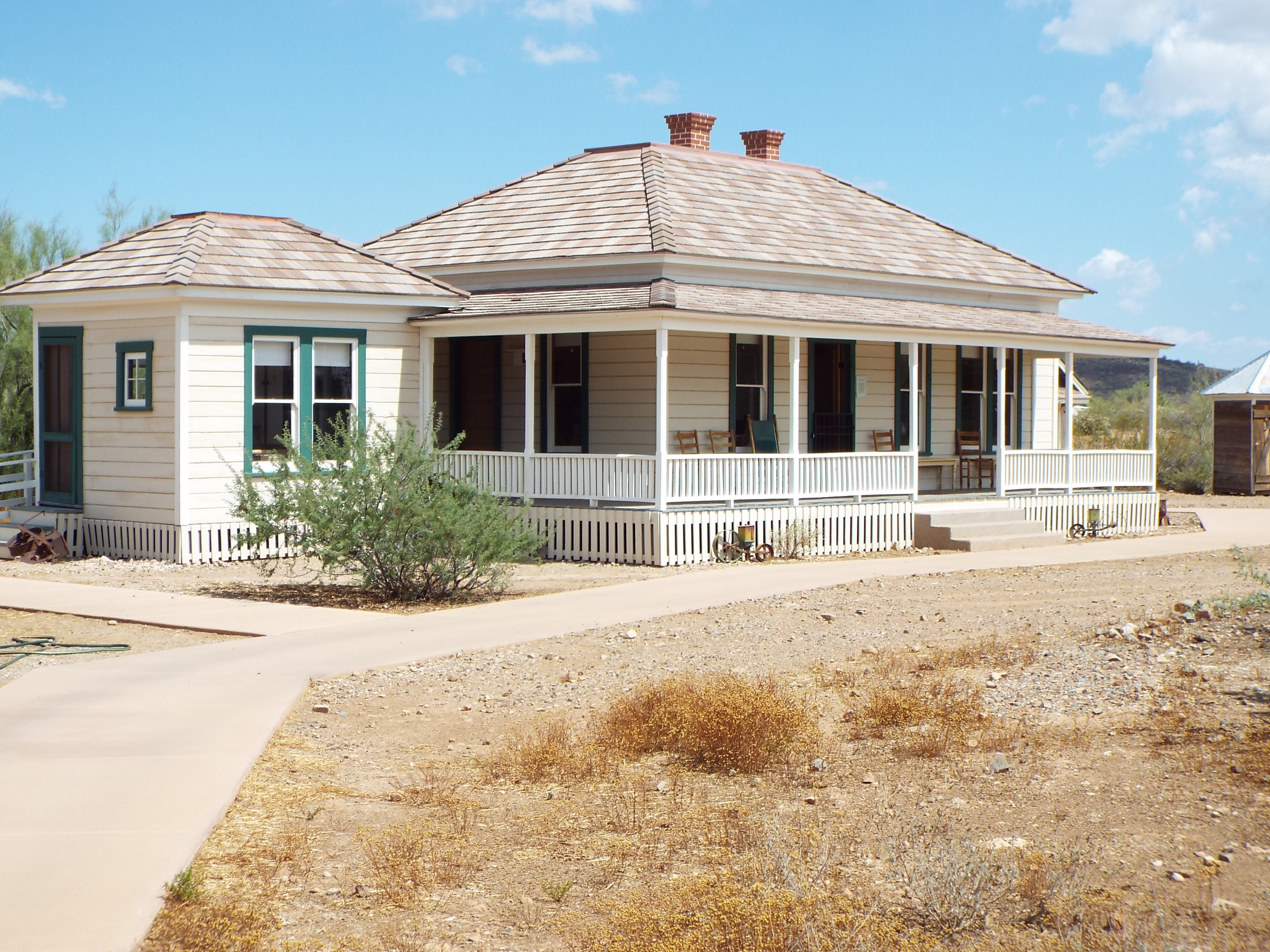
The Meritt Farm House.

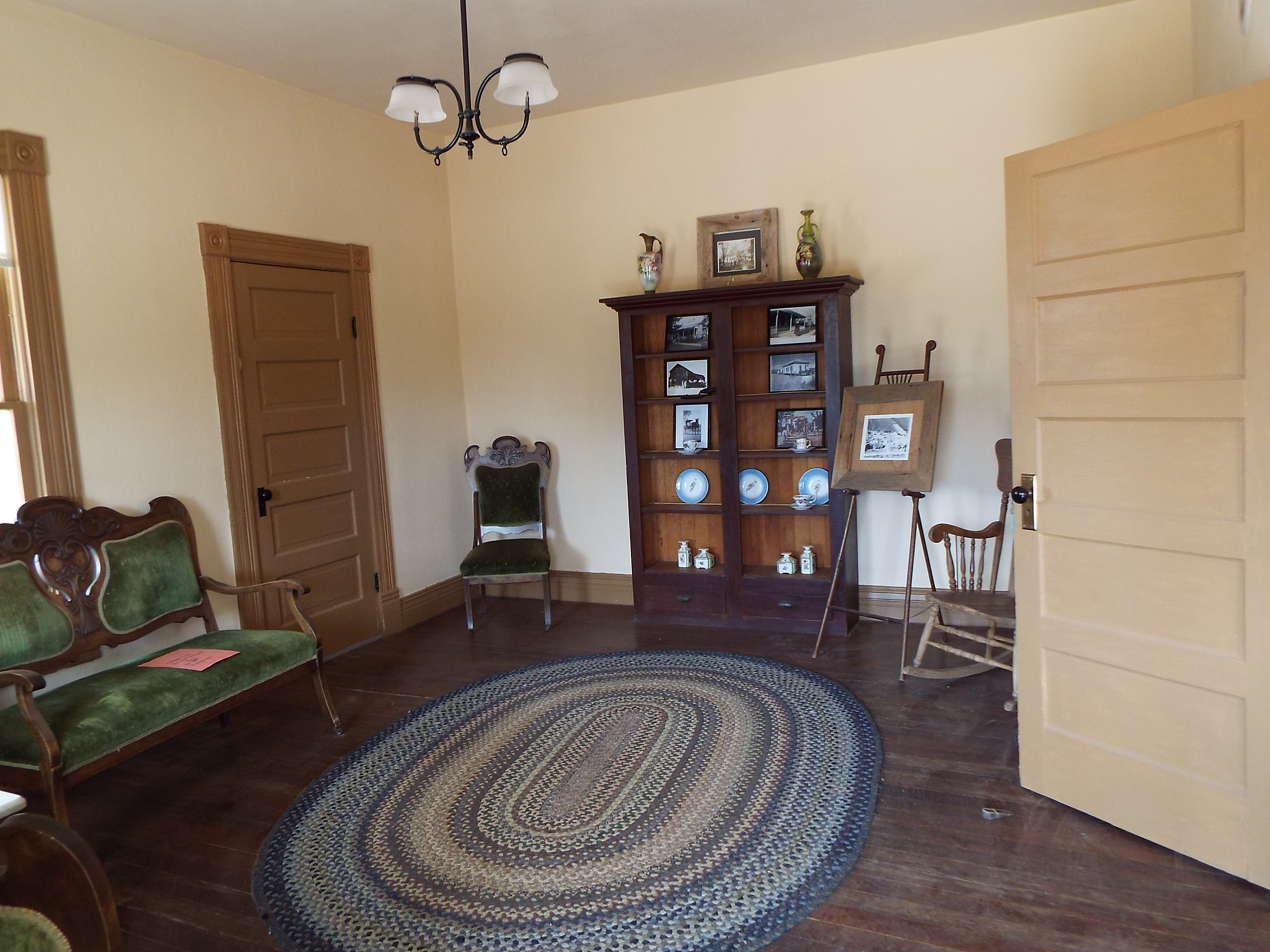
Inside the Meritt Farm House.

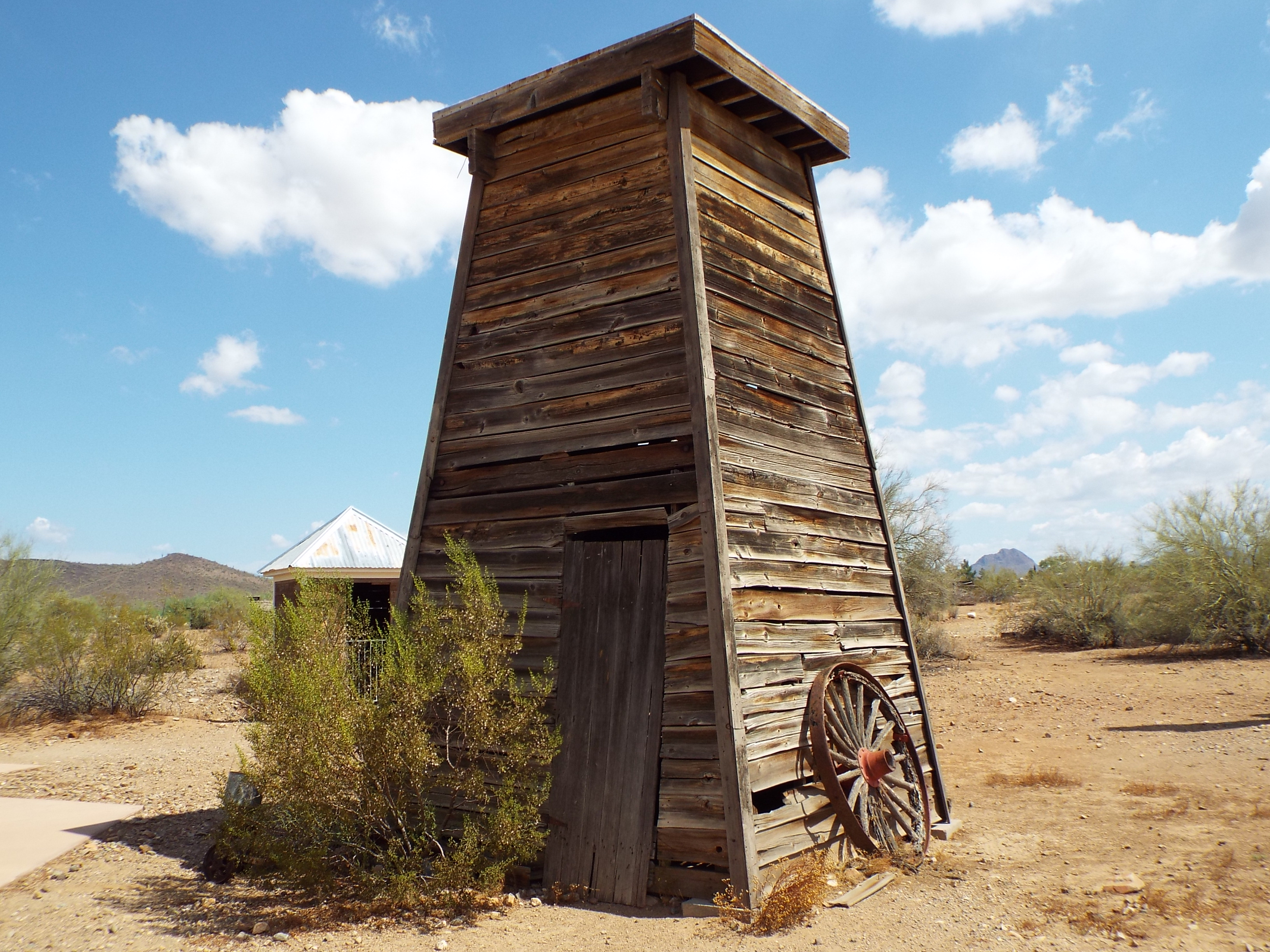
Some of the structures which belonged to the Meritt Farm.

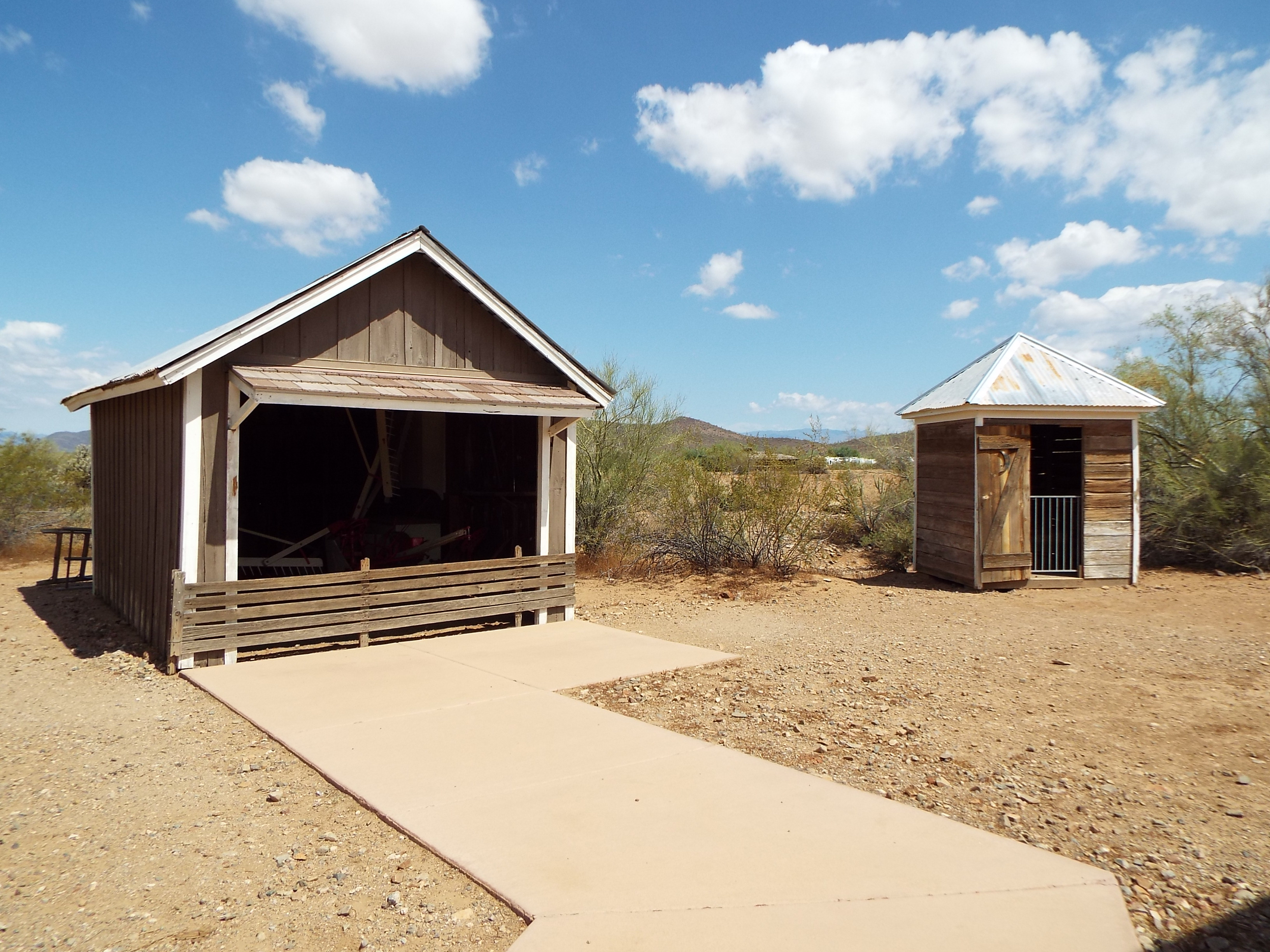
Some of the other structures which belonged to the Meritt Farm.

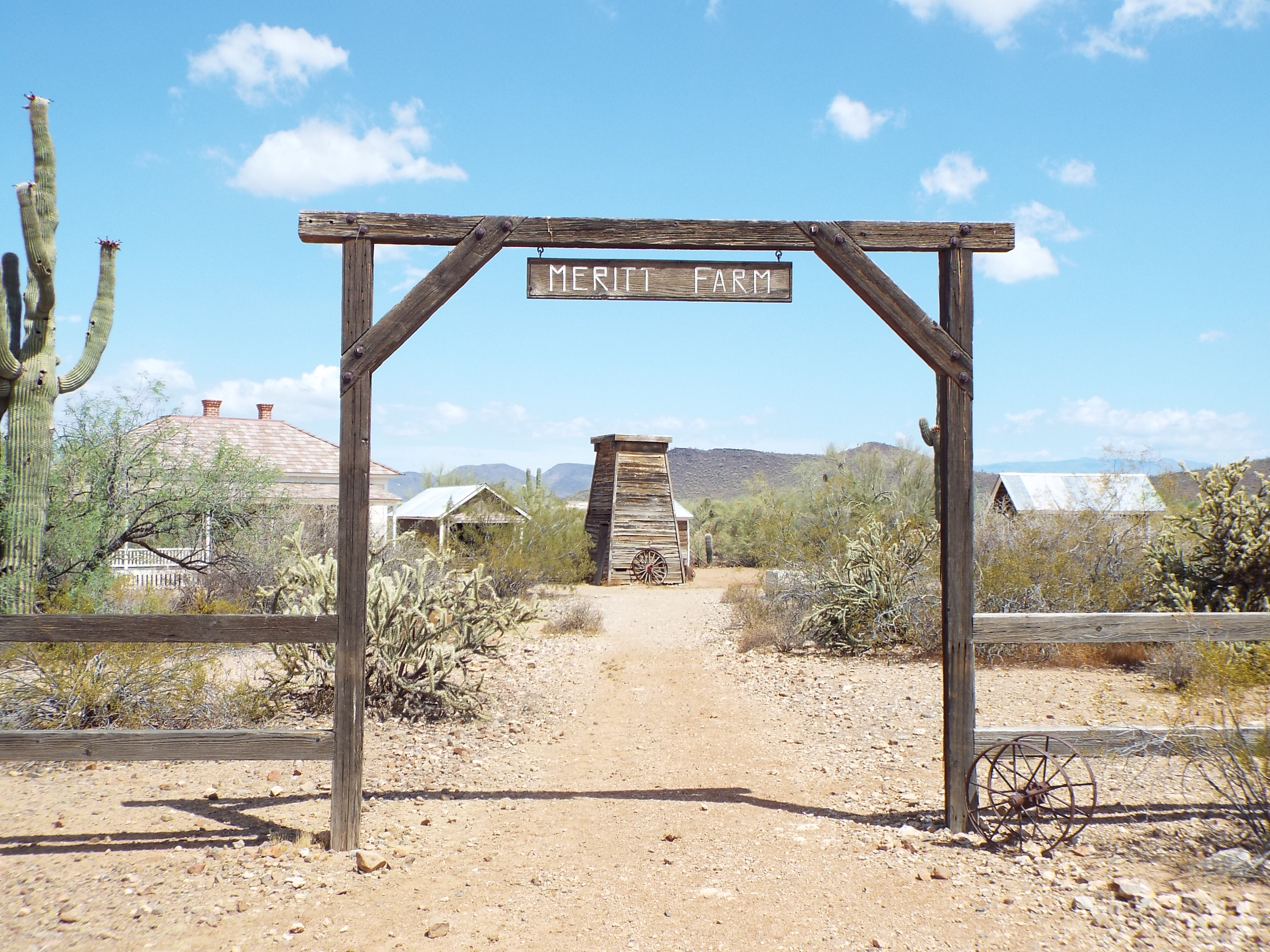
Entrance to the Meritt Farm.

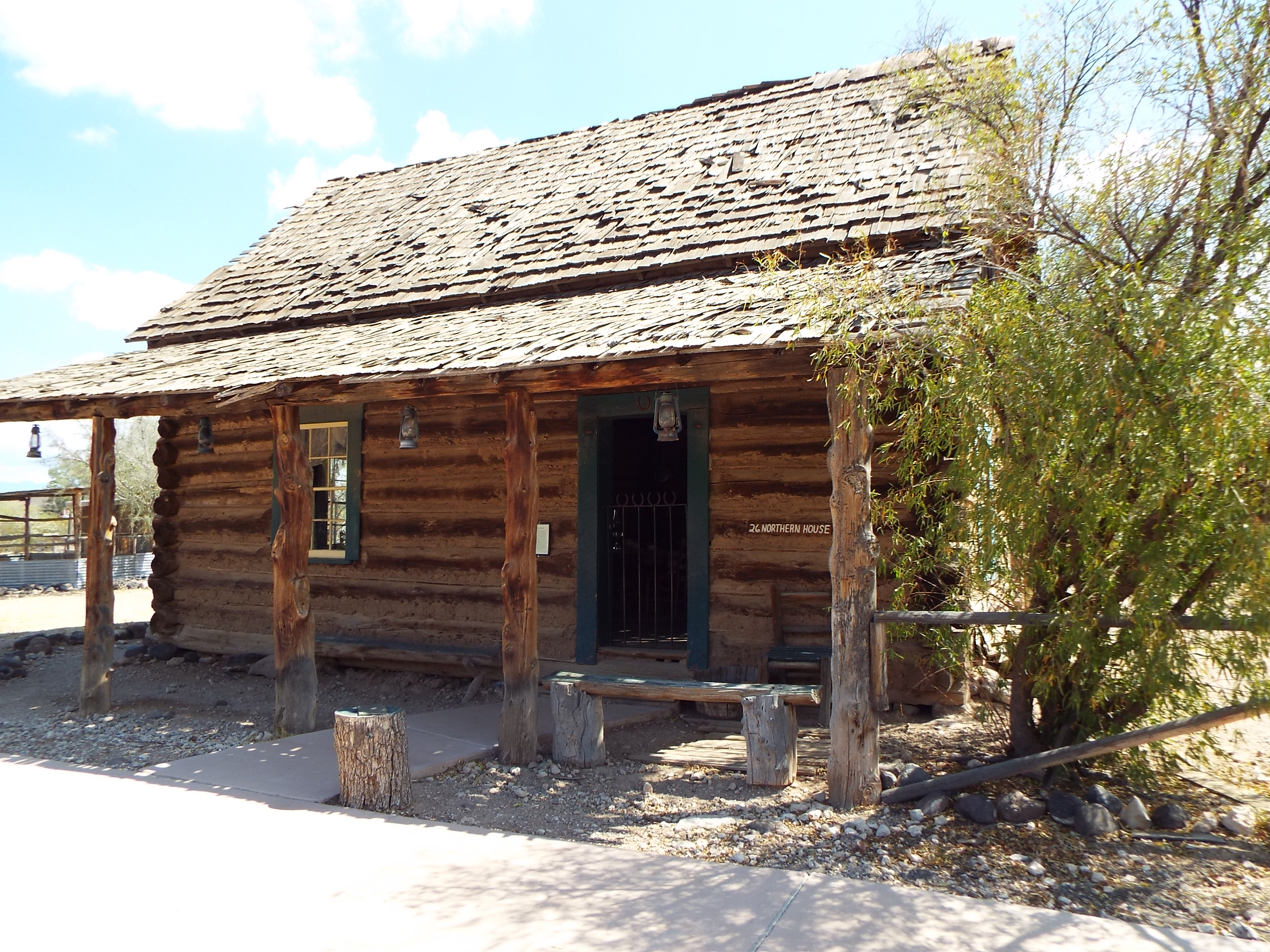
The Northern Home.

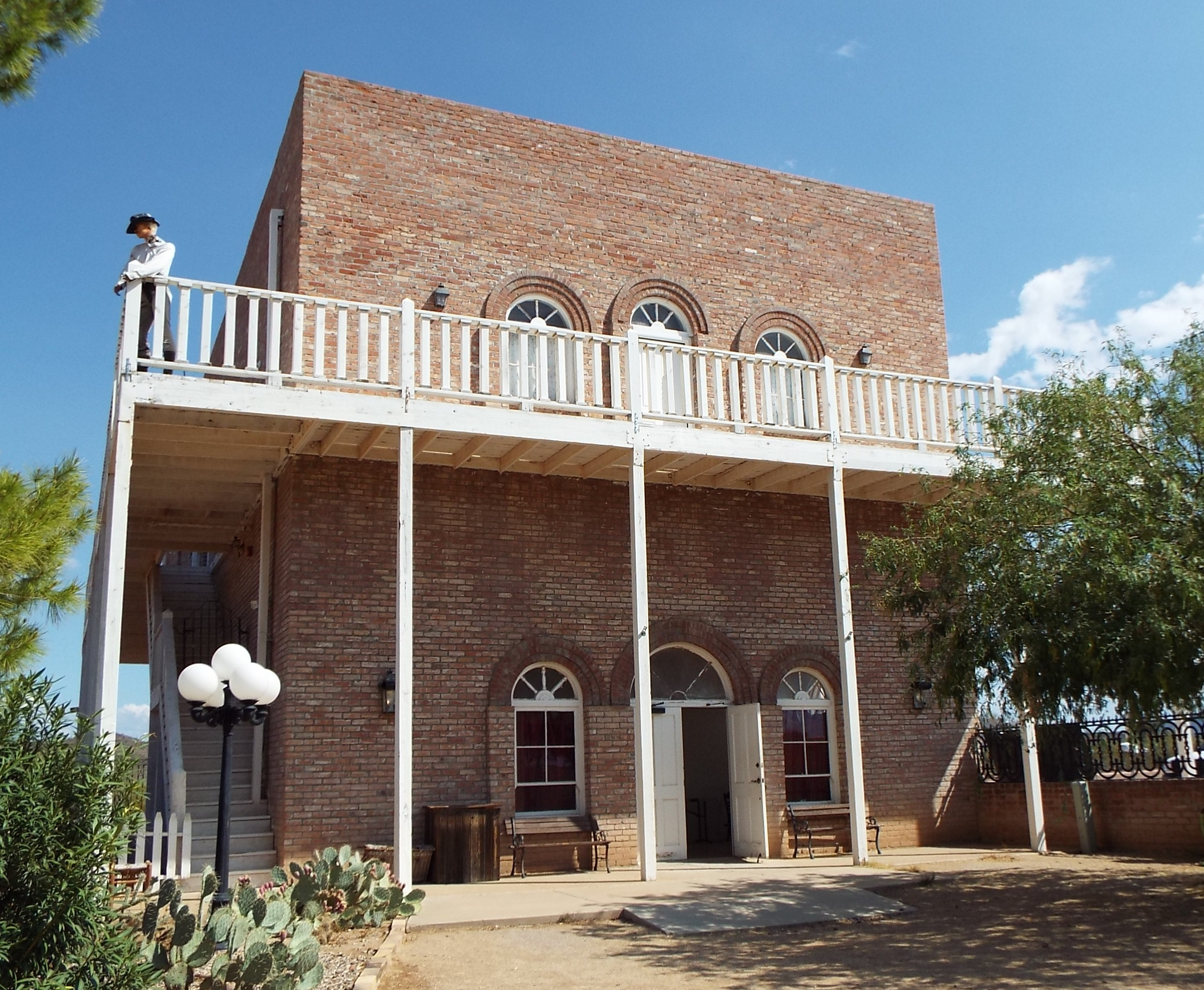
The Opera House.

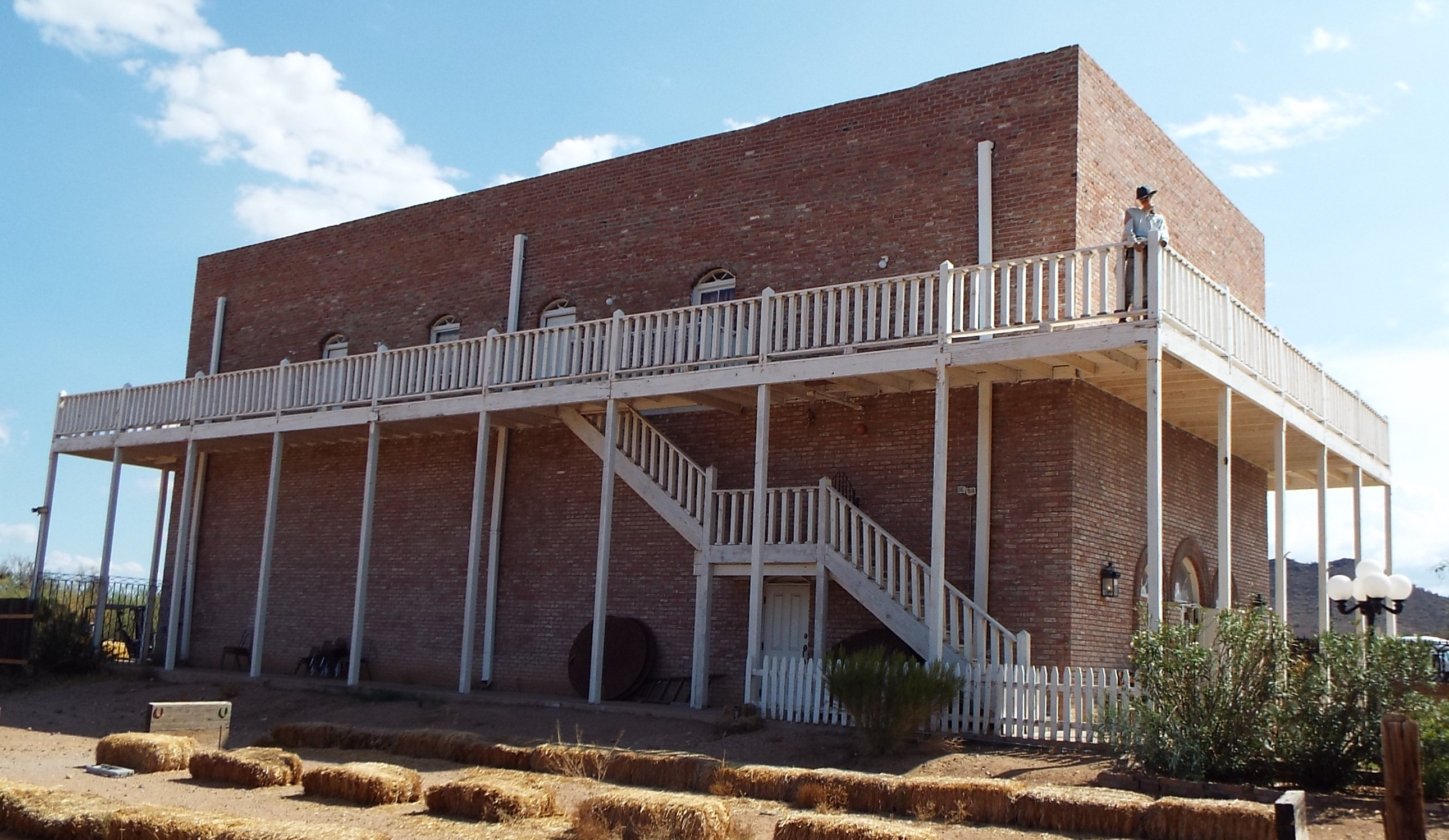
Different view of the 1899 Opera House.

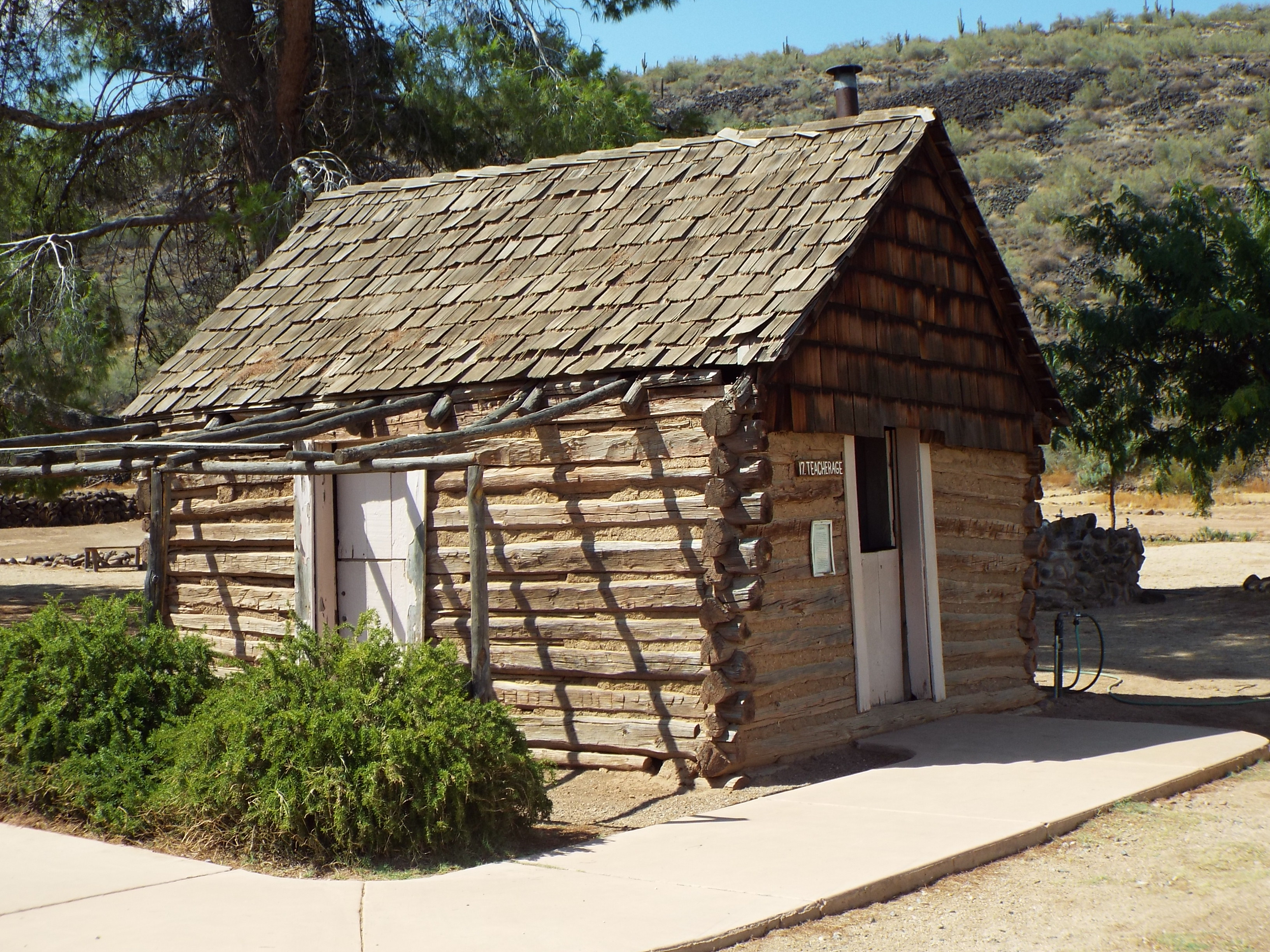
The Teacherage Cabin.

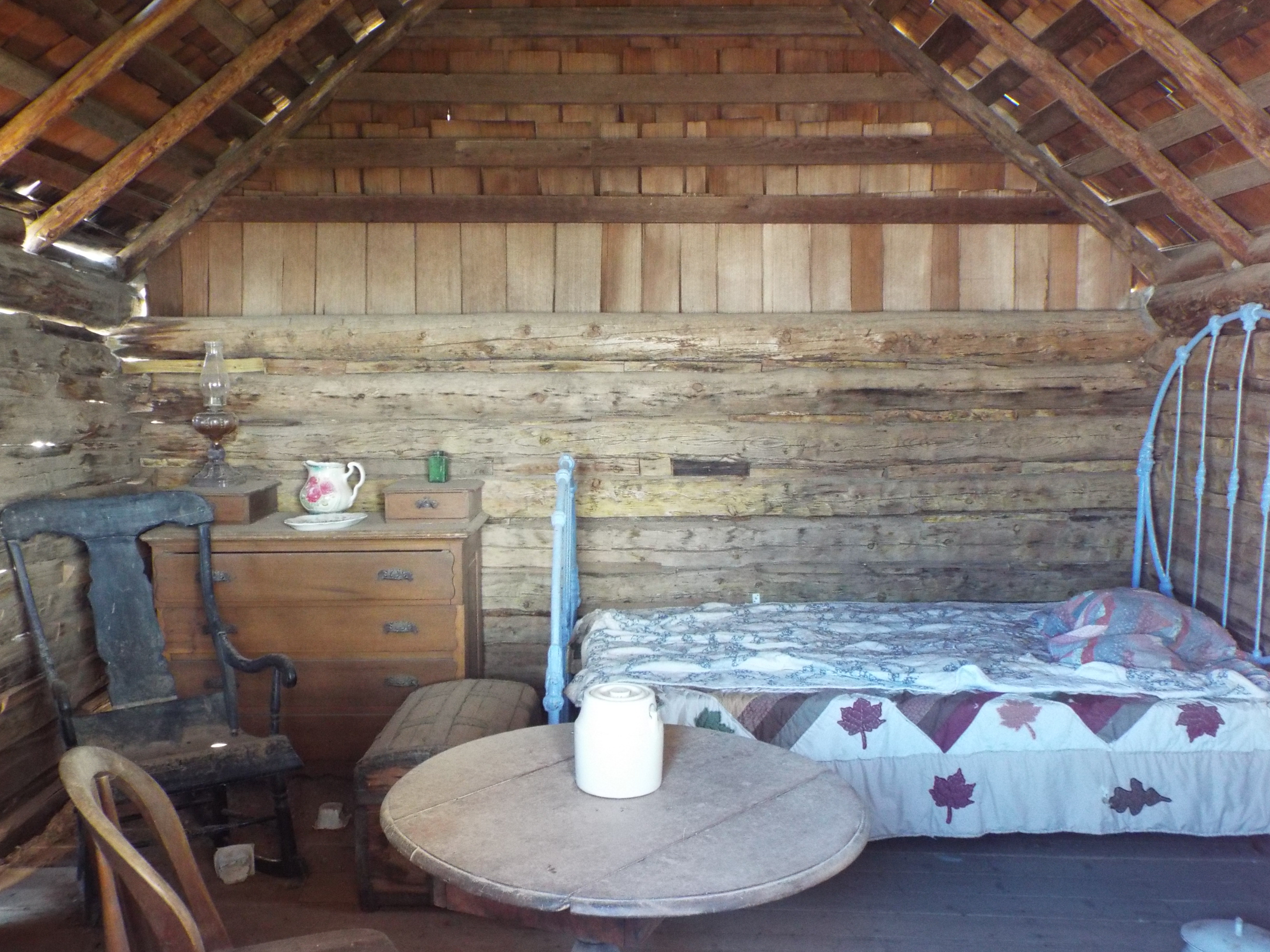
Inside the 1890 Teacherage Cabin.

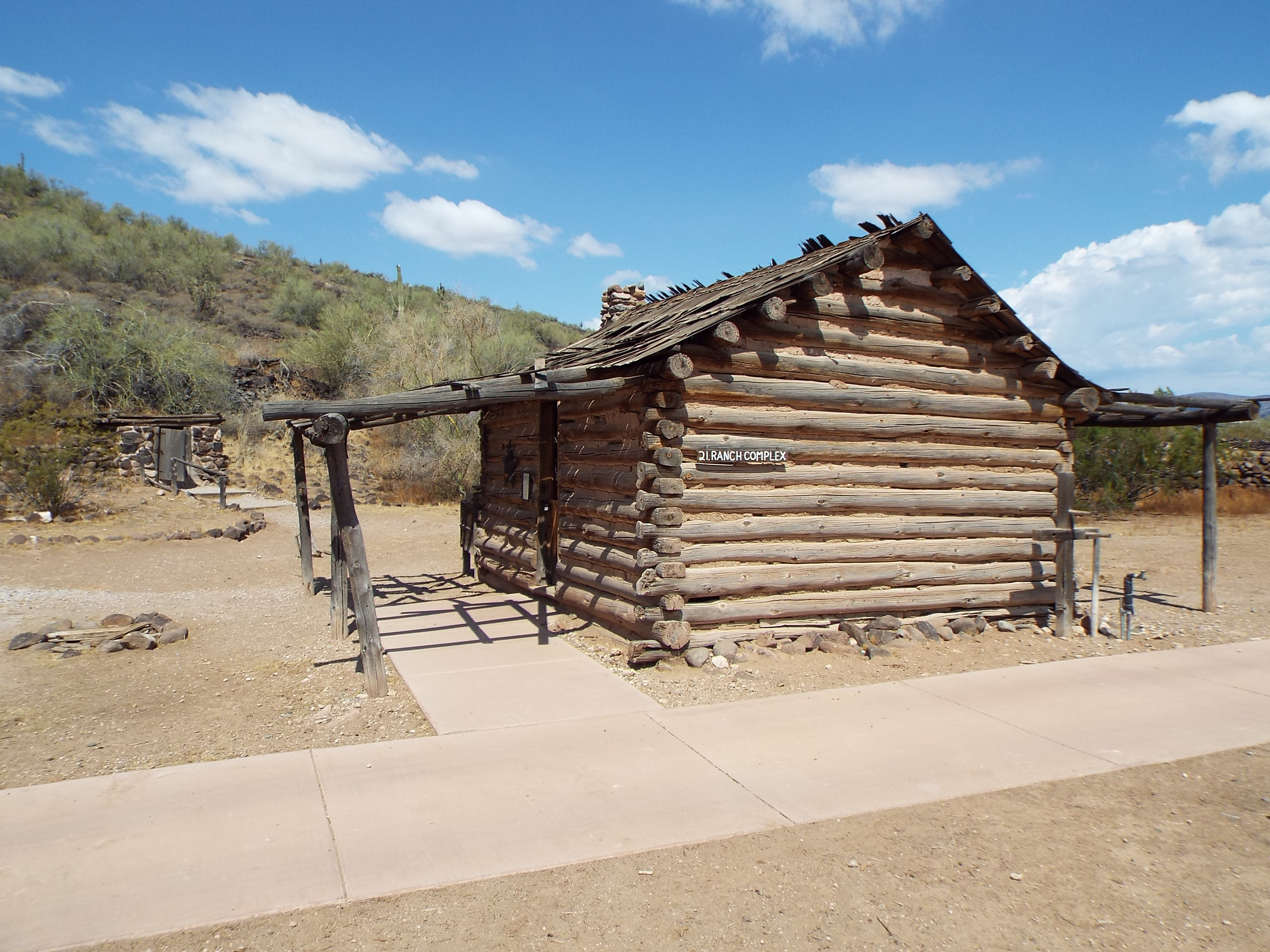
The Ranch Complex.

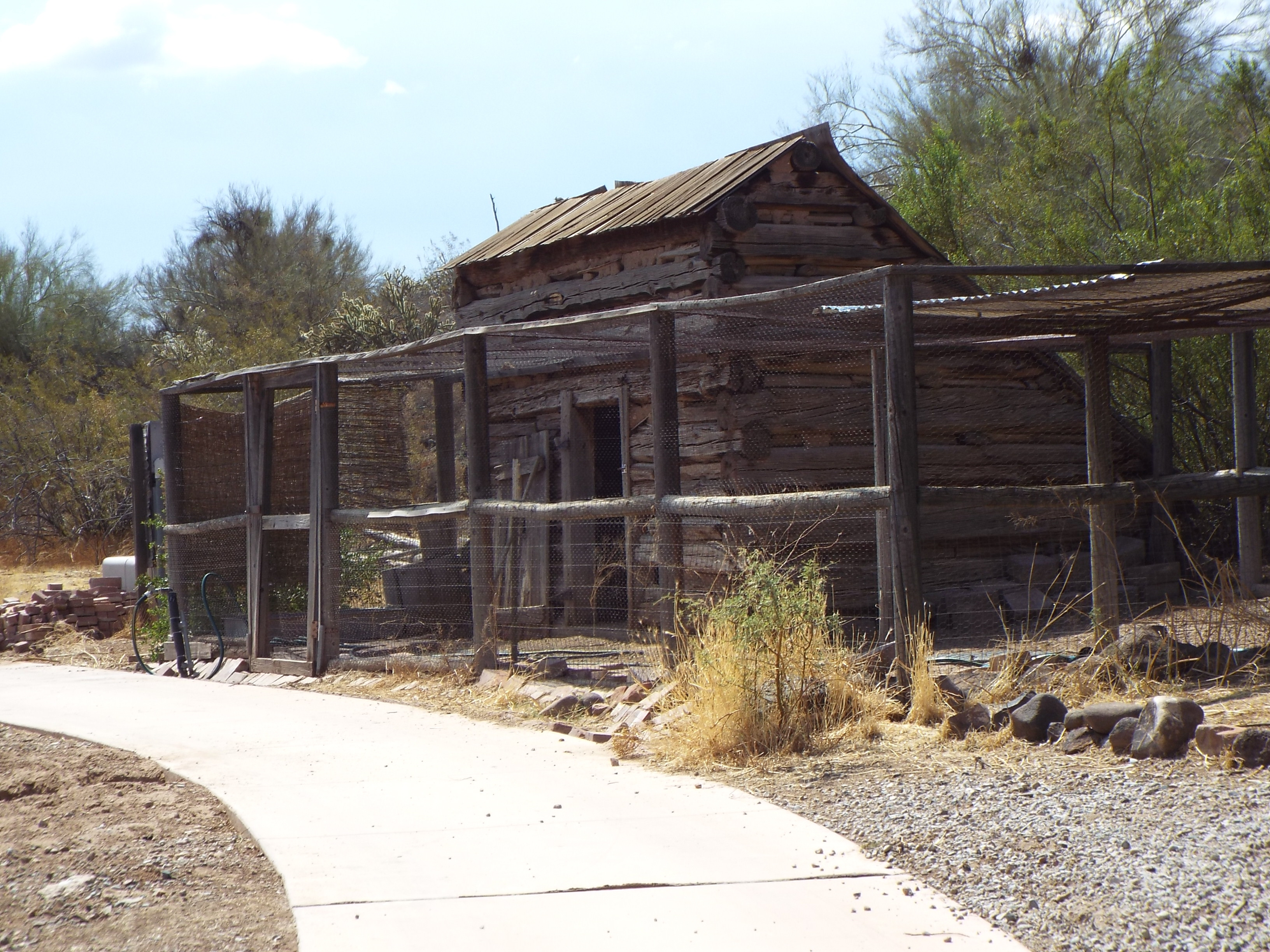
One of the buildings in the Ranch Complex.

== See also ==
- List of historic properties in Phoenix, Arizona
- Cave Creek Museum
- Children's Museum in Phoenix
- Pioneer and Military Memorial Park
- Martin Auto Museum
- Phoenix Police Museum
- Wells Fargo Museum
- List of museums in Arizona
- List of open-air and living history museums in the United States
- List of historic properties in Goldfield, Arizona
