= Pioneer Days =

Pioneer Days may refer to:

- Pioneer Days (Chico, California), an annual community event
- Pioneer Days (1930 film), a Mickey Mouse short
- Pioneer Days (1940 film), a Western film by Harry S. Webb
- Pioneer Days, an annual festival held in Kalida, Ohio

== See also ==
- Pioneer Day, a Utah state holiday
