= USC&GS Pioneer =

USC&GS Pioneer is the name of more than one ship of the United States Coast and Geodetic Survey, and may refer to:

- USC&GS Pioneer (1918), a survey ship in service from 1922 to 1941
- USC&GS Pioneer (1929), a survey ship in service from 1941 to 1942
- USC&GS Pioneer (OSS 31), a survey ship in service from 1946 to 1966
