= MV American Courage =

Self-discharging bulk carrier

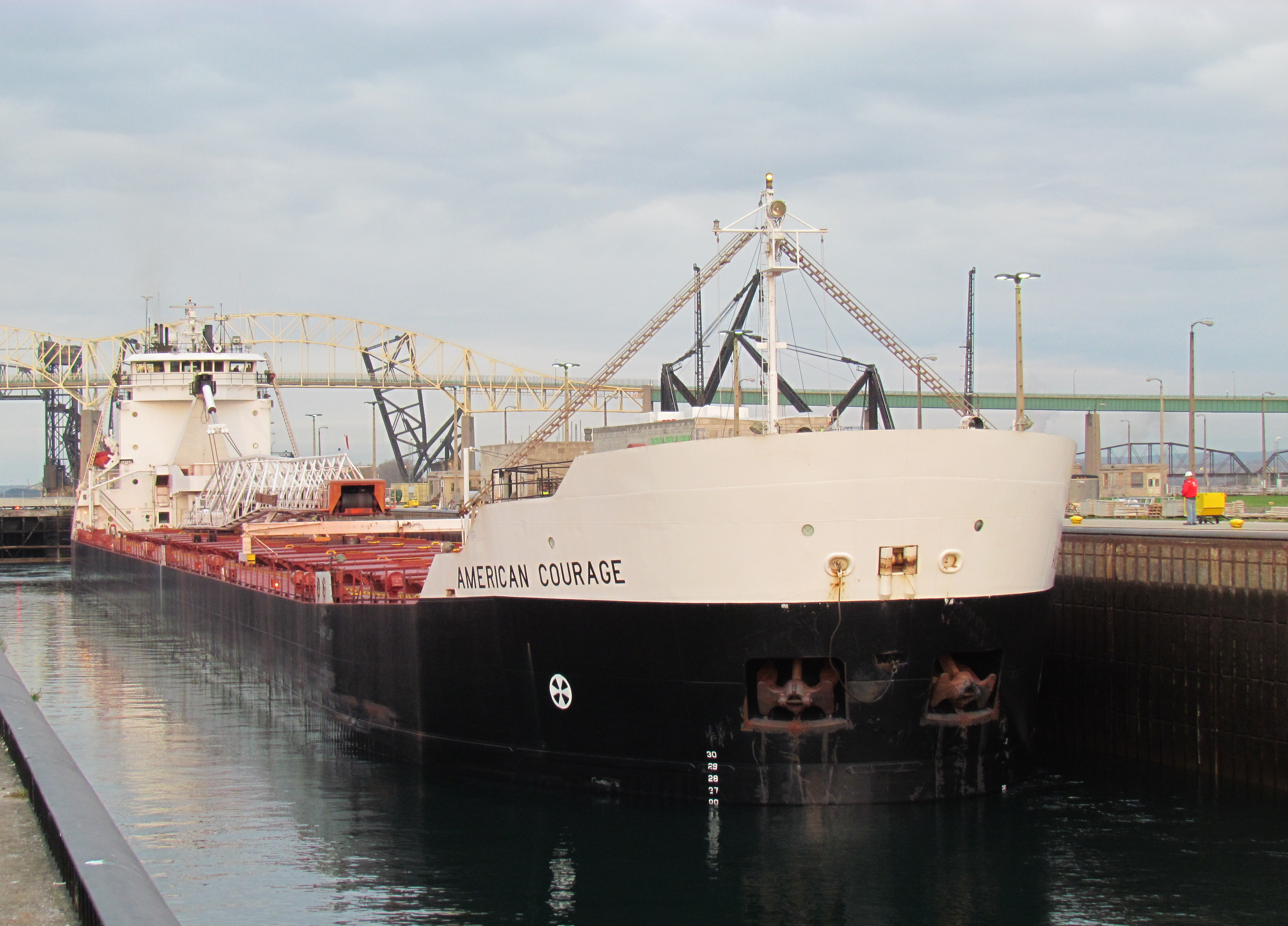
- American Courage

History
- Name: American Courage
- Builder: Bay Shipbuilding Company
- Yard number: 722
- Launched: 16 November 1978
- Identification: Call sign: WDD2879; IMO number: 7634226
- Status: In active service

General characteristics
- Class & type: Lake freighter
- Tonnage: 11,688 GT; 8,105 NT
- Length: 634 ft 10 in (193 m) (overall); 615 ft (187 m)
- Beam: 68.1 ft (20.8 m)
- Draft: 27 ft 11.875 in (8.53123 m) (midsummer draft); 38 ft (12 m) (hull depth)
- Propulsion: two 3,500 hp (2,600 kW) General Motors Electro Motive Division (EMD) diesel engines, 7,000 shp (5,200 kW)

MV American Courage is a diesel-powered lake freighter owned and operated by Grand River Navigation. This vessel was built in 1979 at Bay Shipbuilding Company, Sturgeon Bay, Wisconsin and included self-unloading technology.

The ship is 635 feet (194 m) long and 68 feet (21 m) wide, with a carrying capacity of 24,300 gross tonnage (GT) at midsummer draft. The vessel carries a variety of cargoes including limestone, coal or iron ore.

== History ==
The ship was built for Oglebay Norton Corporation in 1979 and named Fred R. White, Jr. for the company's former vice president and director. As Fred R. White, Jr., the vessel made its first voyage in May 1979 to on-load iron ore at Escanaba, Michigan. American Steamship Company acquired American Courage in 2006. On December 17, 2015 the end of the shipping season, American Courage was put into long term layup. The vessel re-entered service on April 12, 2019. On November 7, 2023, the ship ran aground on the St. Clair River. She was refloated later that same day.
