= MV American Mariner =

Self-discharging bulk carrier

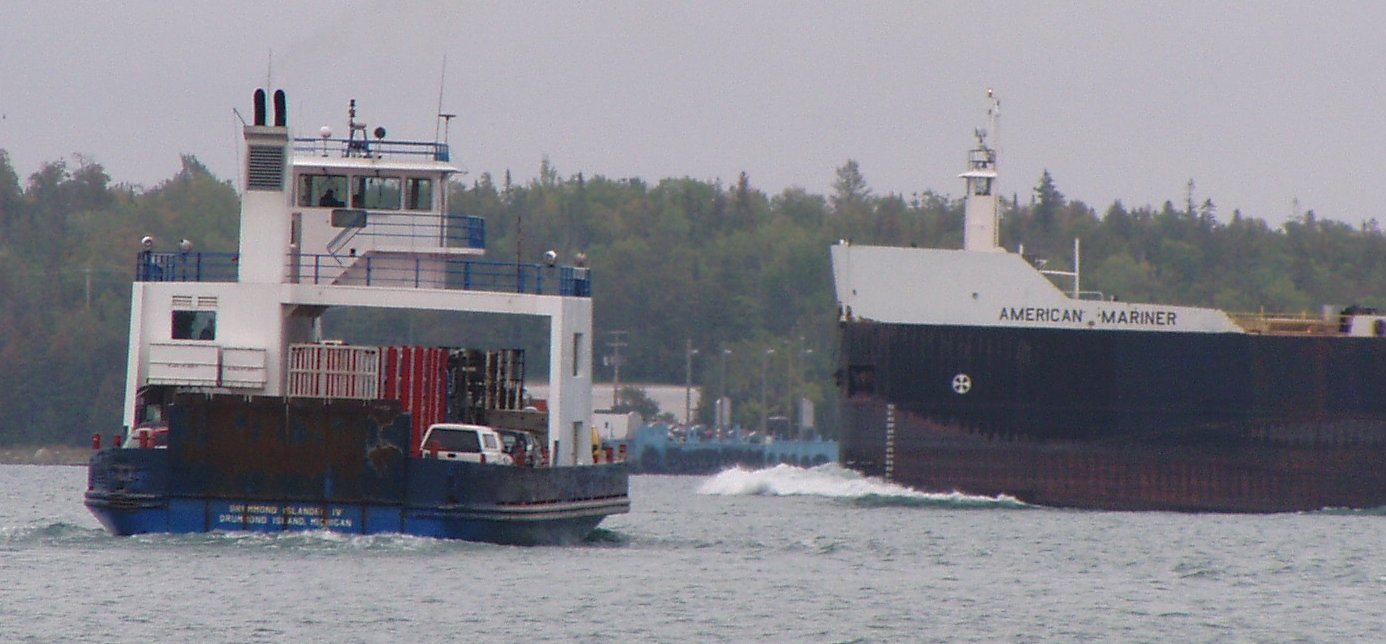
- American Mariner (right) with Drummond Island Ferry

History

United States
- Name: American Mariner
- Builder: Bay Shipbuilding Company
- Yard number: 723
- Launched: August 2, 1979
- Completed: 1980
- In service: April 1980
- Identification: Call sign: WQZ7791; IMO number: 7812567
- Status: In service as of 2024

General characteristics
- Type: Lake freighter
- Tonnage: 15,396 GT; 11,245 NT
- Length: 730 ft (220 m) (overall); 714.8 ft (217.9 m)
- Beam: 78 ft (24 m)
- Draft: 30 ft 11.875 in (9.44563 m) (midsummer draft); 42.7 ft (13.0 m) (hull depth)
- Propulsion: two 3,500 hp (2,600 kW) General Motors Electro Motive Division (EMD) diesel engines, 7,000 shp (5,200 kW)

MV American Mariner is a diesel-powered lake freighter owned and operated by the American Steamship Company (ASC). This vessel was built in 1980 at Bay Shipbuilding Company, Sturgeon Bay, Wisconsin and included self-unloading technology.

The ship is 730 feet (220 m) long and 78 feet (24 m) wide, with a carrying capacity of 37,300 tons (at midsummer draft), limestone, grain, coal or iron ore.

== History ==
The ship was built for American Steamship in 1980 and was originally planned to be named Chicago. The ship was launched August 2, 1979 and named American Mariner for all American seafarers.

=== Lake Huron incident ===
On April 28, 2000, the vessel lost steering and struck Light number 7 in the Lake Huron Cut. The Mariner was loaded with taconite for Ashtabula, OH. A survey of damage from the accident revealed a 30-foot by 10-foot tear in the forepeak and another 6-inch-wide tear on the starboard bow stretching nearly 25 feet. Flooding from this damage was so severe that the forward cargo hold and tunnels flooded. Temporary repairs were made to control the flooding and the crew lightened the vessel by offloading 3,100 tons of cargo from the number one hold into fleet mate Adam E. Cornelius. She was refloated and underway on Saturday the 29th. Because American Mariner was blocking the channel, the U. S. Coast Guard temporarily closed the area to commercial navigation. The river closure delayed more than 23 vessels.

=== Munuscong Lake incident ===
On March 28, 2024, at approximately 01:00, the ship struck a navigational aid in the midst of Munuscong Lake, blocking the navigation channel of the St. Mary's River. By the afternoon of the following day, she had been cleared to move and left the site under her own power, allowing the shipping channel to be reopened. After a stop at anchor in Raber Bay to more fully assess damage, the ship proceeded to Ashtabula, Ohio for repairs. No injuries or pollution were reported.
