= Lee White =

Lee White may refer to:

- Lee White (actor) (1888–1949), American actor of the stage, screen and radio
- Lee White (American football) (born 1946), American running back
- Lee White (sailor) (born 1957), Bermudian sailor
- Lee White (conservationist) (born 1965), a British-Gabonese conservationist
- Lee C. White (1923–2013), American political advisor to Presidents Kennedy and Johnson

== Lee James White ==
- H. Lee White Marine Museum, Oswego, New York
- MV H. Lee White, an American lake freighter, in service since 1974
