= MV Sam Laud =

Ship built in 1975

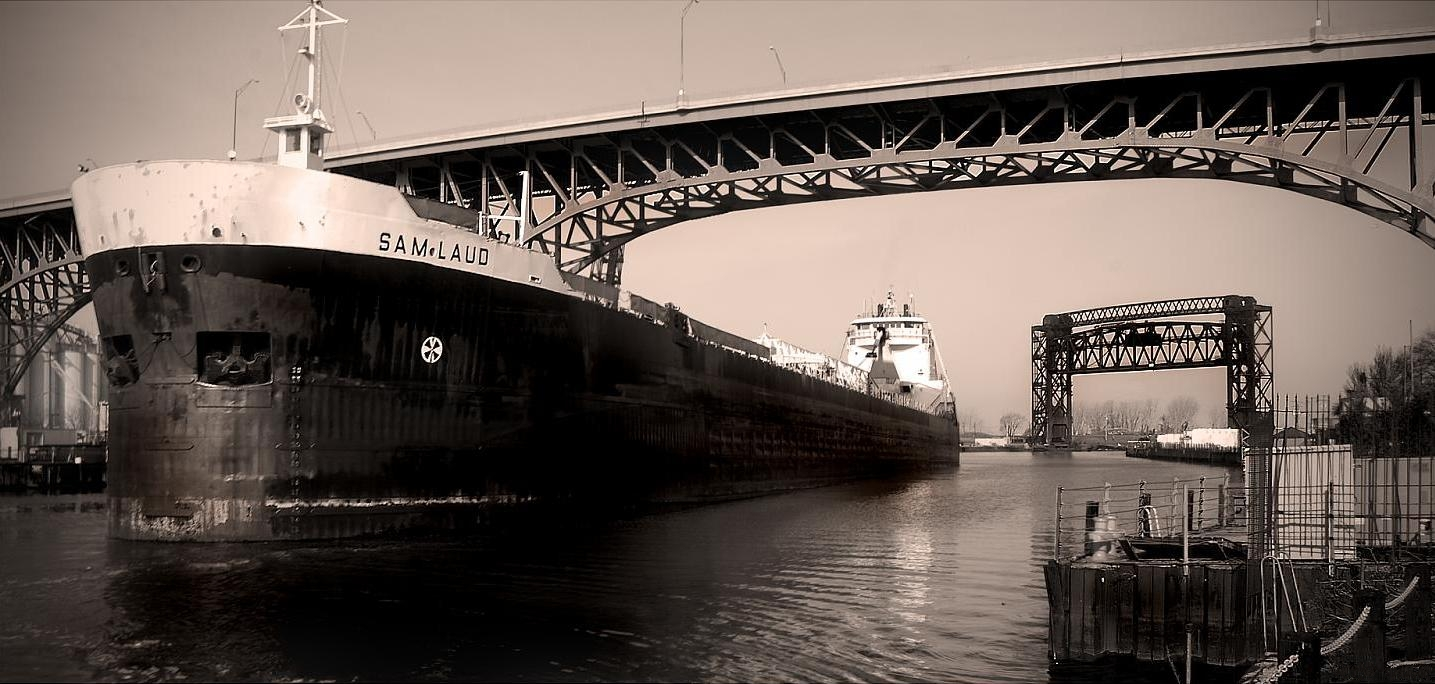
- M/V Sam Laud on the Cuyahoga River.

History

United States
- Name: M/V Sam Laud
- Port of registry: Wilmington, Delaware
- Builder: Bay Shipbuilding Company
- Yard number: 712
- Launched: 1975
- In service: April 1975
- Identification: Call sign: WZC7602; IMO number: 7390210
- Status: In service

General characteristics
- Class & type: Lake freighter
- Tonnage: 11,619 gross tonnage; 8,036 net tonnage
- Length: 634 feet 10 inches (193 m) (overall); 615 feet (187 m)
- Beam: 68.1 ft (20.8 m)
- Draft: 27 ft 11.875 in (8.53123 m) (Midsummer Draft); 38 ft (12 m) (hull depth)
- Propulsion: two 3500 HP General Motors Electro-Motive (EMD) diesel engines, 7,000 SHP x1 propeller

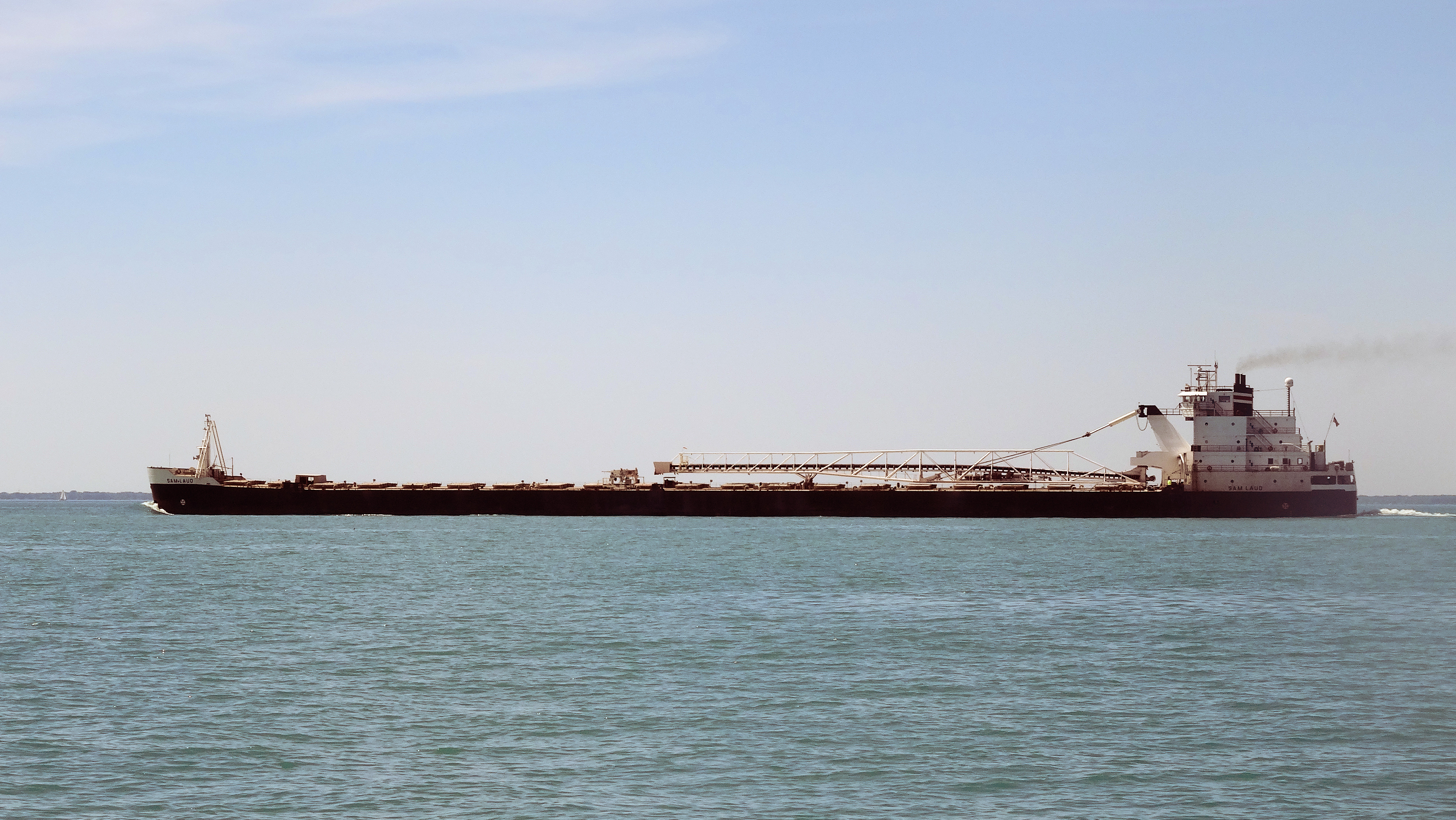
The M/V Sam Laud fully loaded in Lake St. Clair heading towards the Detroit River.

M/V Sam Laud is a diesel-powered Lake freighter owned by the American Steamship Company now a part of the Rand Logistics, Inc. and operated by Grand River Navigation. This vessel was built in 1975 at Bay Shipbuilding Company, Sturgeon Bay, Wisconsin and included self-unloading technology.

The ship is 634 feet 10 inches (193.50 m) long and 68.1 feet (20.8 m) wide, with a carrying capacity of 24,300 tons (at midsummer draft), iron ore pellets, coal, limestone, and gypsum.

== History ==
The ship was built for American Steamship in 1975 and named for GATX's former chairman, Sam Laud (1896-1963). GATX had just acquired American Steamship in 1973. The ship can be briefly seen during the opening credits for the 1989 film Major League. The ship is currently bareboat chartered to a third-party freight carrier.
