= American Century (disambiguation) =

American Century is a term used by some historians to refer to the 20th Century.

American Century may also refer to:

- American Century (comics), a comic series published by DC Comics from 2001
- American Century Investments, an investment management firm
- The American Century: Varieties of Culture in Modern Times, a book by Norman F. Cantor
- American Century Records, a fictional record company in the TV series Vinyl
- MV American Century, a lake freighter on the Great Lakes
