= Indiana Harbor =

Indiana Harbor may refer to:

- Indiana Harbor and Ship Canal, a harbor and artificial waterway in East Chicago, Indiana connecting Lake Michigan to the Grand Calumet River
- Indiana Harbor (East Chicago), the section of East Chicago located east of the Indiana Harbor and Ship Canal
- Indiana Harbor Works, a steel mill built by Inland Steel and since 2020 operated by Cleveland-Cliffs
- MV Indiana Harbor, a lake freighter built in 1979
