= Walter McCarthy =

Walter McCarthy may refer to:

- Walter T. McCarthy (1898–1985), American lawyer and judge
- MV Walter J. McCarthy Jr., lake freighter

== See also ==
- Walter McCarty (born 1974), American basketball player
