= MV H. Lee White =

Diesel-powered Lake freighter

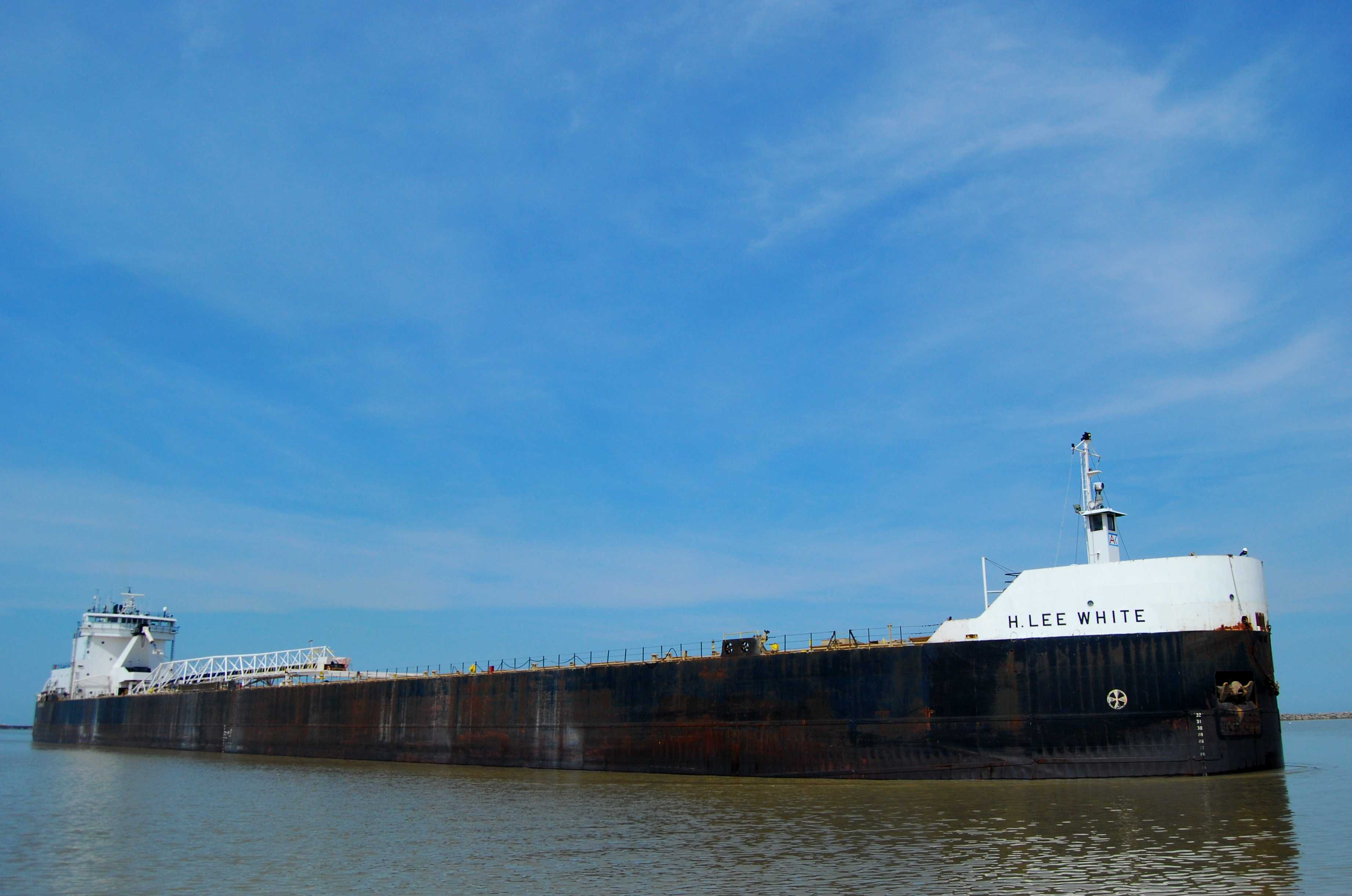
- H. Lee White

History

United States
- Name: MV H. Lee White
- Builder: Bay Shipbuilding Company
- Yard number: 711
- Completed: 1974
- In service: June 1974
- Identification: Call sign: WZD2465; IMO number: 7366362
- Status: In service as of 2024

General characteristics
- Class & type: Lake freighter
- Tonnage: 14,449 gross tonnage; 10,348 net tonnage
- Length: 704 feet (215 m) (overall); 690.8 feet (211 m)
- Beam: 78 ft (24 m)
- Draft: 30 ft 7.625 in (9.33768 m) (Midsummer Draft); 42.7 ft (13.0 m) (hull depth)
- Propulsion: two 3500 HP General Motors Electro Motive Division (EMD) diesel engines, 7,000 SHP

M/V H. Lee White is a diesel-powered Lake freighter owned and operated by the American Steamship Company (ASC). This vessel was built in 1974 at Bay Shipbuilding Company, Sturgeon Bay, Wisconsin and included self-unloading technology.

The ship is 704 feet (215 m) long and 78 feet (24 m) wide, with a carrying capacity of 35,400 tons (at midsummer draft), limestone, grain, coal or iron ore.

== History ==
The ship was built for American Steamship in 1974 and was named H. Lee White for former chairman Harris Lee White.

On September 6, 1992, H. Lee White struck the Grosse Ile Toll Bridge knocking off one of the spans. Damage to the bridge was around $1.7 million for repairs and lost toll revenue. Courts initially ruled the bridge company 100% liable as they did not open the bridge as promised. On appeal, the judgement was reversed and sent back to the district court for re-evaluation of liability. In 2006, the ship and American Steamship were found 3% liable, as the port anchor could have been deployed to potentially avoid the collision. The bridge company was found 97% liable for not opening the bridge in a timely manner as promised and requested.
