= MV American Integrity =

Great Lakes cargo ship

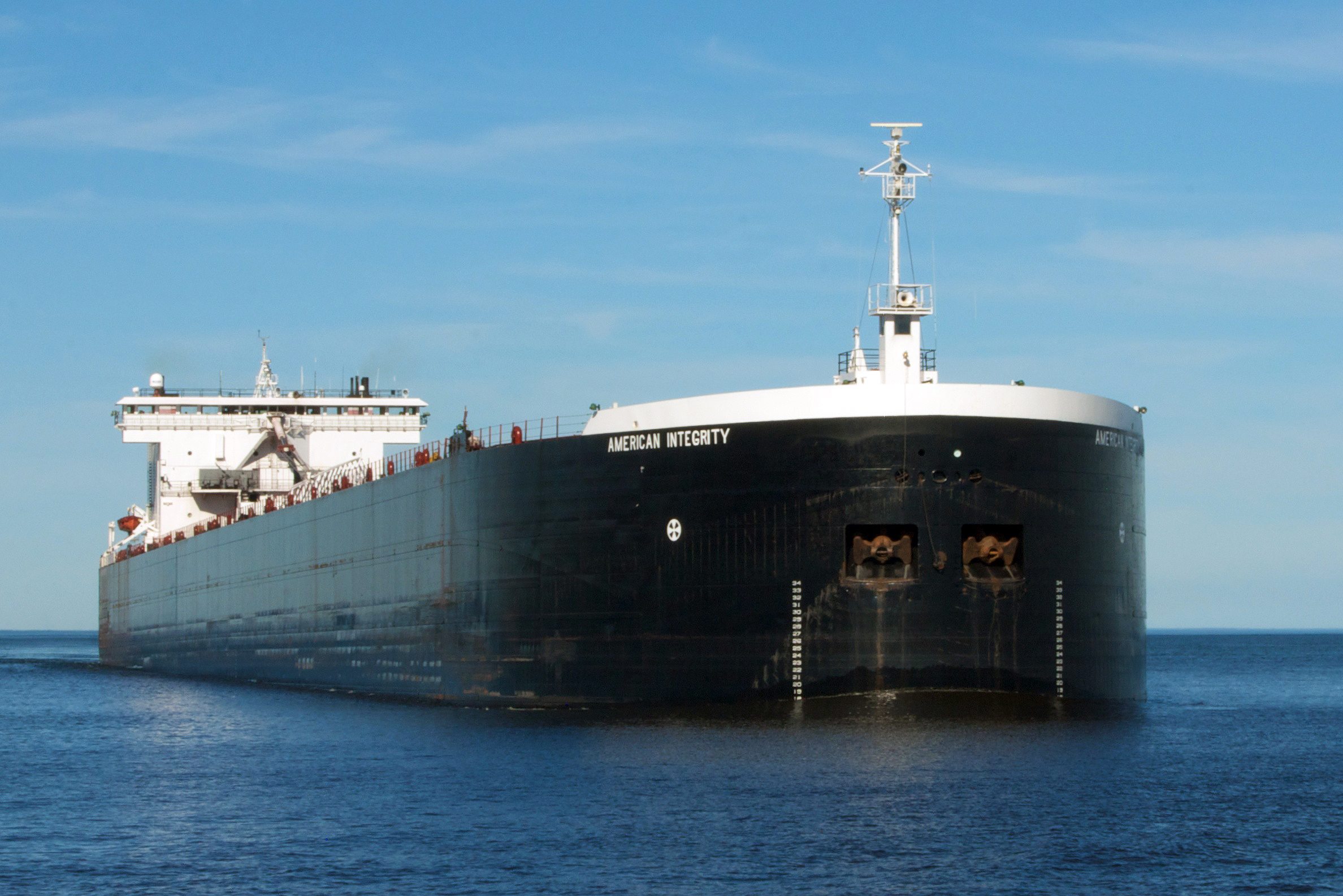

History

United States
- Name: American Integrity
- Builder: Bay Shipbuilding Company
- Yard number: 717
- Launched: 1978
- Identification: Call sign:WDD2875; IMO number: 7514696
- Status: In service as of 2026

General characteristics
- Class & type: lake freighter
- Tonnage: 35,652 GT; 33,263 NT
- Length: 1,000 ft (305 m) (overall); 988.8 ft (301 m)
- Beam: 105 ft (32 m)
- Draft: 34.75 ft (10.59 m) (Midsummer Draft); 56.7 ft (17.3 m) (hull depth)
- Propulsion: four 3,500 hp (2,600 kW) General Motors Electro Motive Division (EMD) diesel engines, 14,000 shp (10,000 kW)

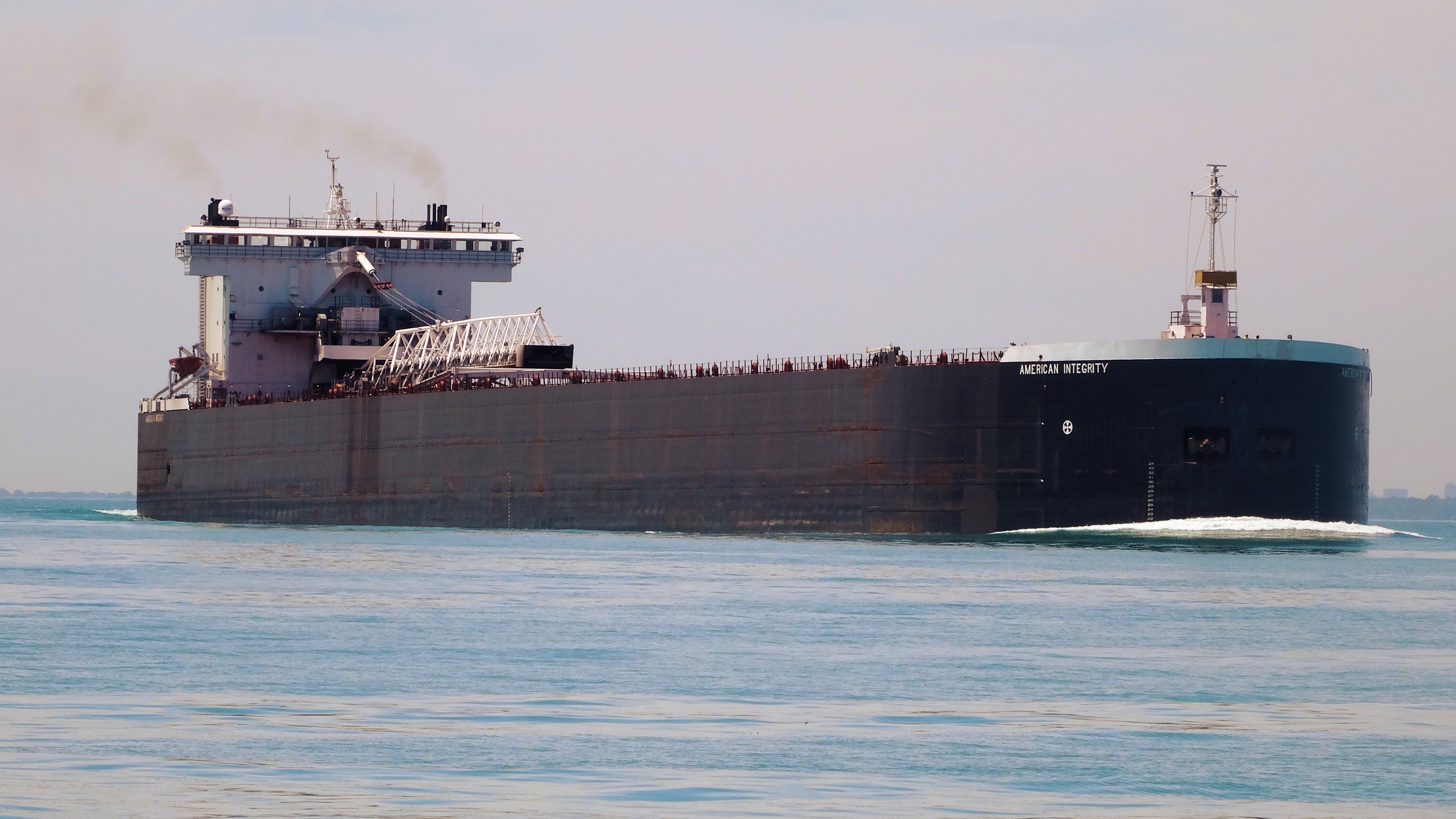
American Integrity on Lake St. Clair heading to the St. Clair River empty and riding high. Looking at the bow.

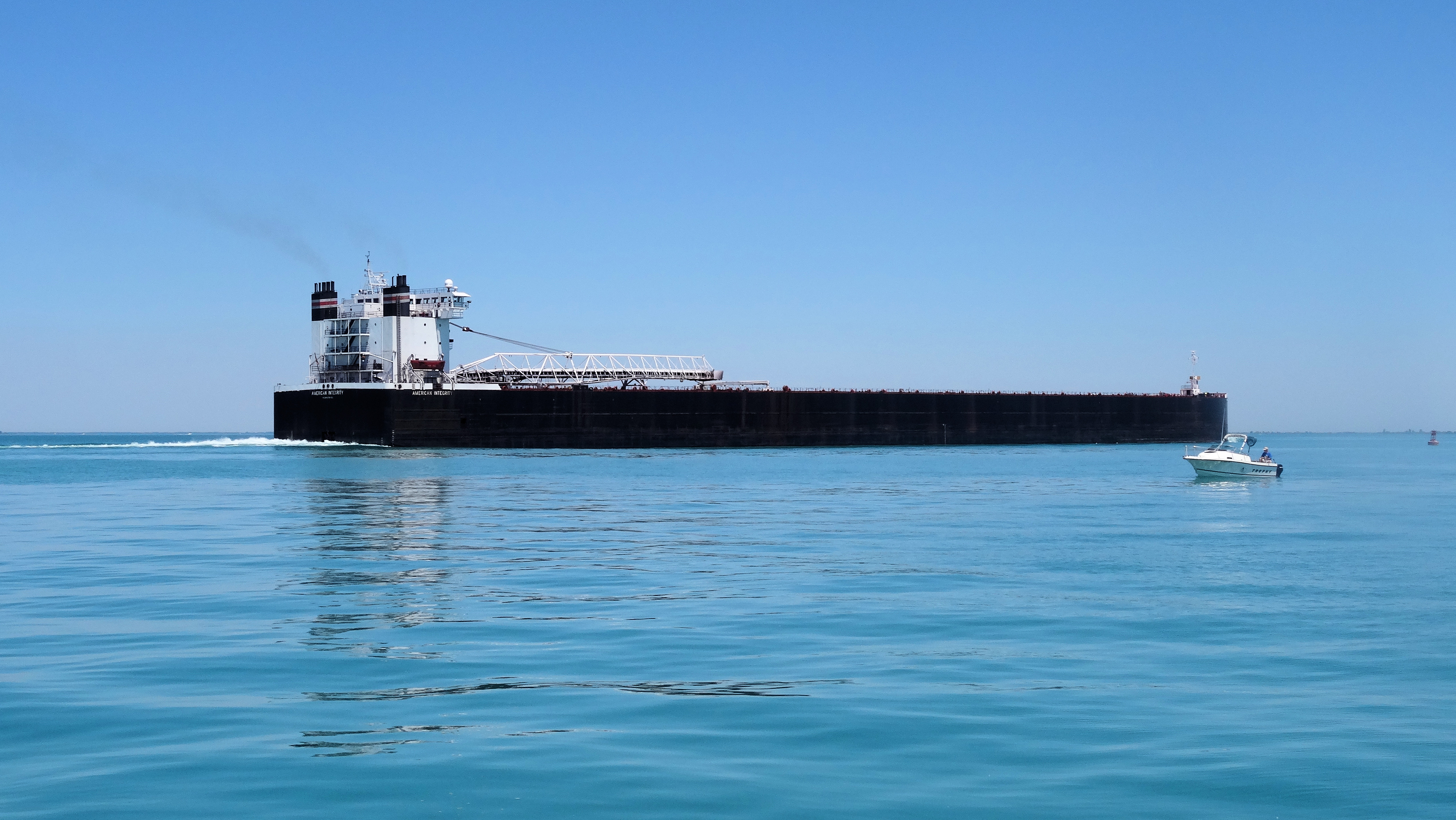
American Integrity on Lake St. Clair heading to the St. Clair River empty and riding high. Looking at the stern.

MV American Integrity is a ship built in 1978 by Bay Shipbuilding Company in Sturgeon Bay, Wisconsin. She is one of the thirteen 1,000 footers in the Great Lakes laker fleet. She was originally built as Lewis Wilson Foy and was renamed Oglebay Norton in 1991. She was renamed again after the sale to American Steamship Company in June 2006. On September 24, 2017 American Integrity broke the all-time record for the largest load through the Soo Locks with 75,095 tons of iron ore beating the record held for the last two weeks by Edwin H. Gott. She was loaded to a draft of 29 ft 7 in (9.02 m) on her way to Indiana Harbor.

Her overall length is 1,000 feet, beam is 105 feet and depth 56 feet. She is able to unload 10,000 tons/hour. She has seven cargo holds and 37 hatches. She has 14,000 horsepower and 2 propellers.
