= MV Burns Harbor =

Self-discharging bulk carrier

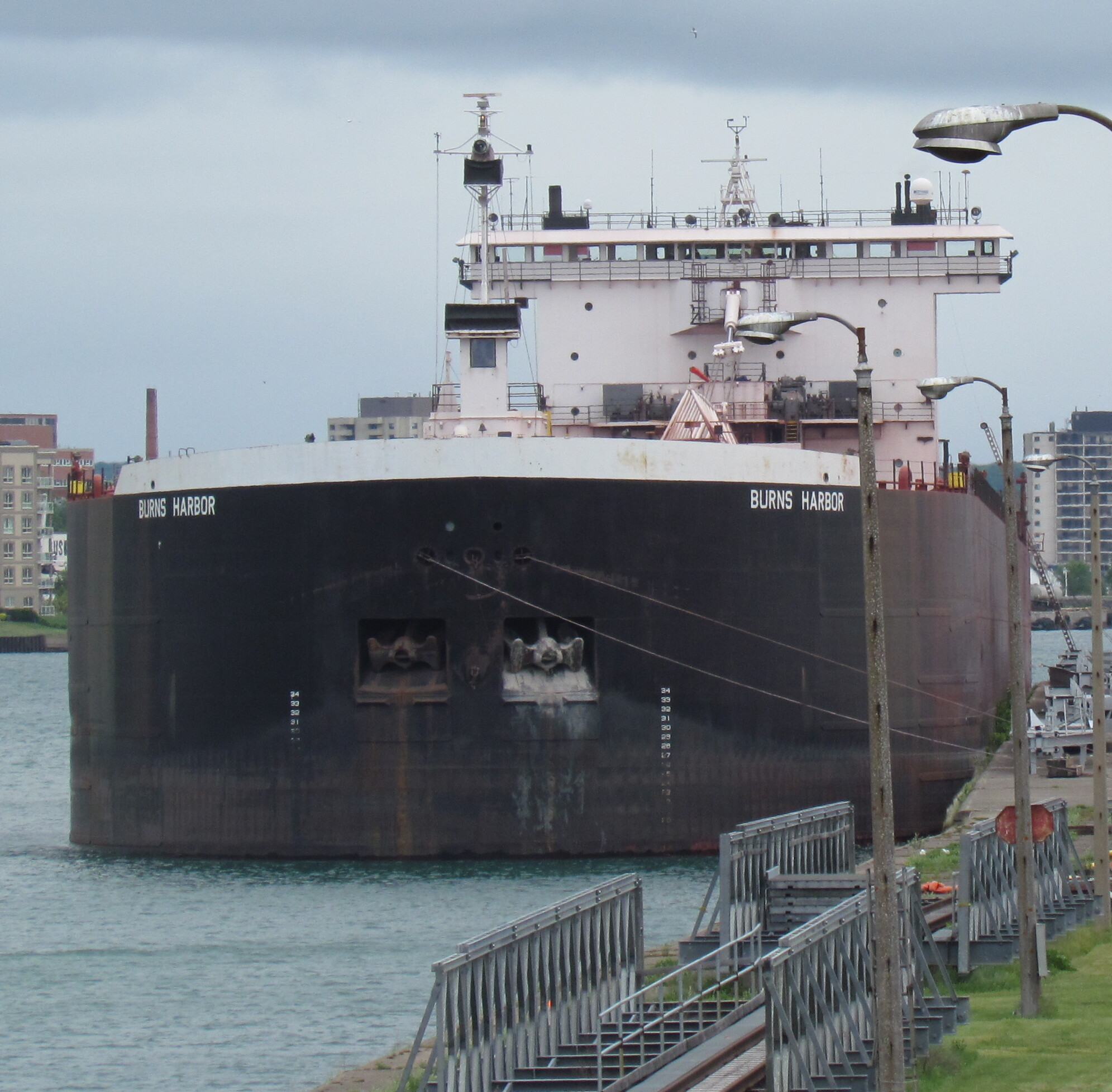
- Burns Harbor in 2012

History

United States
- Name: Burns Harbor
- Namesake: Bethlehem Steel's facility at Burns Harbor, Indiana
- Owner: American Steamship Company
- Operator: American Steamship Company
- Ordered: 1978
- Builder: Bay Shipbuilding Company
- Yard number: 720
- Laid down: 16 April 1979
- Launched: 1980
- Identification: Call sign: WDC6027; IMO number: 7514713
- Status: In service as of 2025

General characteristics
- Class & type: Lake freighter
- Tonnage: 35,652 GT; 33,263 NT
- Length: 1,000 ft (300 m) (overall); 988.8 ft (301.4 m)
- Beam: 105 ft (32 m)
- Draft: 34.75 ft (10.59 m) (midsummer draft); 56.7 ft (17.3 m) (hull depth)
- Propulsion: four 3,500 hp (2,600 kW) General Motors Electro Motive Division (EMD) diesel engines, 14,000 shp (10,000 kW)

MV Burns Harbor is a very large diesel-powered lake freighter owned and operated by the American Steamship Company. This vessel was built in 1980 at Bay Shipbuilding Company, Sturgeon Bay, Wisconsin and included self-unloading technology.

The ship is 1,000 feet long and 105 feet wide, with a carrying capacity of 80,900 deadweight tons at midsummer draft, either coal or iron ore.

== History ==
The ship was built for Bethlehem Steel and named for their steel mill in Burns Harbor, Indiana. Burns Harbor made its first voyage September 28, 1980 to on-load iron ore in Superior, Wisconsin. American Steamship Company acquired Burns Harbor in 2005. The ship belongs to the same class as fleet mates Walter J McCarthy Jr, Indiana Harbor, American Integrity, and American Century, however Burns Harbor features an extra deck on the aft superstructure, which differentiates it.
