= MV Indiana Harbor =

Diesel-powered lake freighter (built 1979)

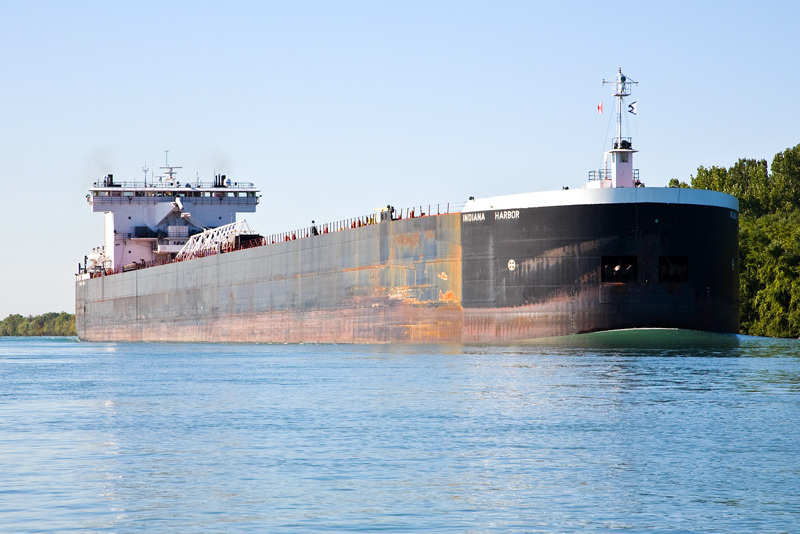
- The Indiana Harbor in 2008

History

United States
- Name: MV Indiana Harbor
- Namesake: Indiana Harbor, Indiana
- Builder: Bay Shipbuilding Company
- Yard number: 719
- Launched: 1979
- Identification: Call sign:WXN3191; IMO number: 7514701
- Status: In service as of 2022

General characteristics
- Class & type: Lake freighter
- Tonnage: 35,923 GT; 33,534 NT
- Length: 1,000 feet (305 m) (oa); 988.8 feet (301 m)
- Beam: 105 ft (32 m)
- Draft: 34.75 ft (10.59 m) (midsummer draft); 56 ft (17 m) (hull depth)
- Propulsion: four 3,500 hp (2,600 kW) General Motors Electro Motive Division (EMD) diesel engines, 14,000 shp (10,000 kW)

MV Indiana Harbor is a very large diesel-powered lake freighter owned and operated by the American Steamship Company. This vessel was built in 1979 at Bay Shipbuilding Company, Sturgeon Bay, Wisconsin and included self-unloading technology.

The ship is 1,000 feet (300 m) long and 105 feet (32 m) wide, with a carrying capacity of 77,500 Net tons of Iron Ore which is the record tonnage through the Soo Locks.

== Service history ==
In May 1984, Indiana Harbor became the largest ship to ever enter the harbor at Ludington, Michigan, delivering 45,000 tons of limestone to the Dow plant in Ludington. The following year, it also set another record delivering 50,090 tons of limestone. In August 1986, Indiana Harbor broke the Lake Erie record for loading coal by taking on 52,000 tons of coal at Toledo, Ohio. Ten days later, Indiana Harbor ran aground in the St. Clair River.

On September 8, 1993, the ship collided with the Lansing Shoals Light Station. There were no injuries, but the collision caused approximately $1.9 million damage to the ship and $100,000 in damage to the light. On January 3, 1996, Indiana Harbor grounded in the St. Marys River and suffered an 8-foot (2.4 m) gash in the port bow.
