= MV Walter J. McCarthy Jr. =

American Great Lakes bulk freighter

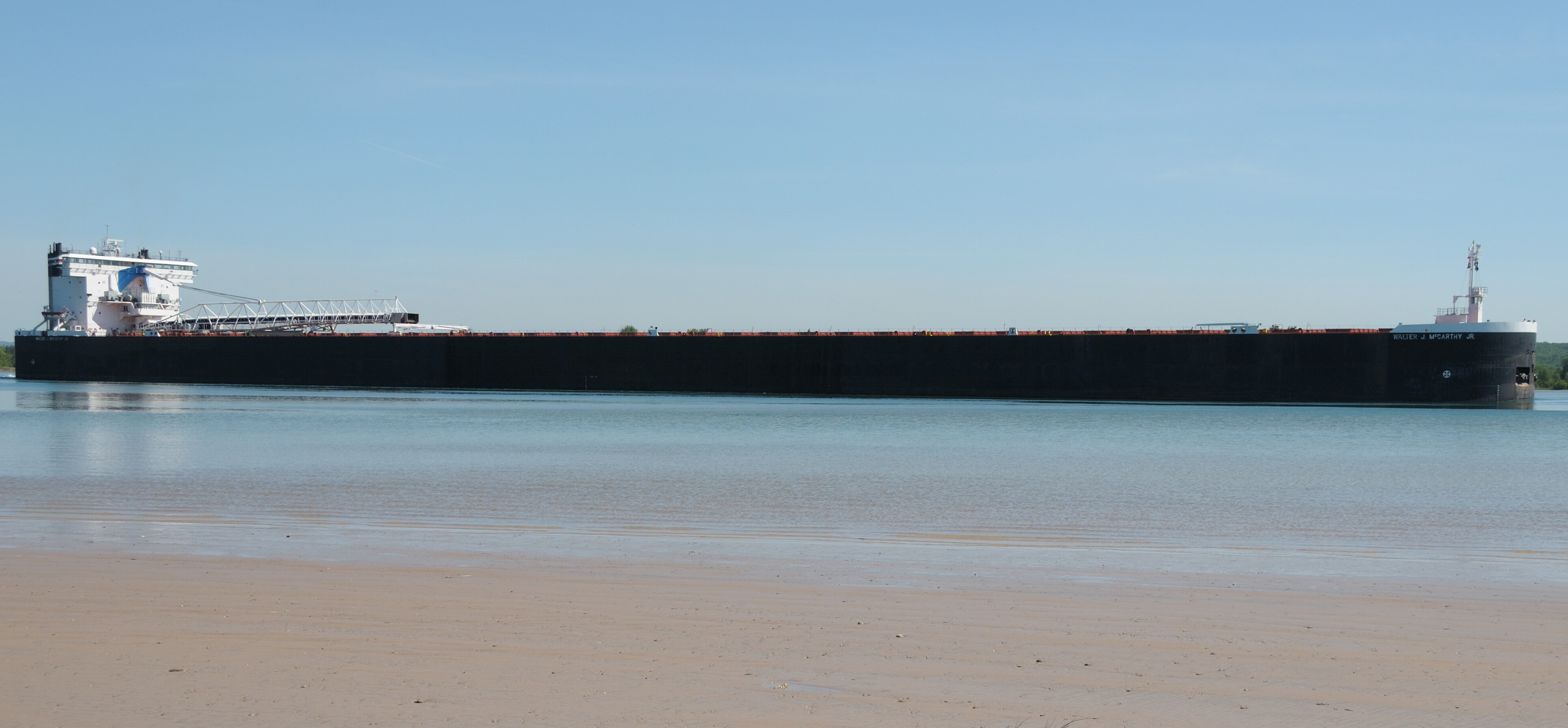
- Walter J. McCarthy Jr.

History

United States
- Name: MV Walter J. McCarthy Jr.
- Operator: American Steamship Company
- Builder: Bay Shipbuilding Company
- Yard number: 716
- Launched: 1977
- Identification: Call sign: WXU3434; IMO number: 7514684
- Status: In service as of 2022

General characteristics
- Class & type: Lake freighter
- Tonnage: 35,923 gross tonnage; 33,534 net tonnage
- Length: 1,000 feet (305 m) (overall); 988.8 feet (301 m)
- Beam: 105 ft (32 m)
- Draft: 34.75 ft (10.59 m) (Midsummer Draft); 56.7 ft (17.3 m) (hull depth)
- Propulsion: four 3500 HP General Motors Electro Motive Division (EMD) diesel engines, 14,000 SHP
- Speed: 14 kn
- Crew: 25

M/V Walter J. McCarthy Jr. is a 1000' diesel-powered lake freighter owned and operated by the American Steamship Company. This vessel was built in 1977 at Bay Shipbuilding Company, Sturgeon Bay, Wisconsin and included self-unloading technology.

The ship is 1,000 feet (300 m) long and 105 feet (32 m) wide, with a carrying capacity of 80,900 tons (at midsummer draft). The ship carries western coal from Superior, Wisconsin to Detroit Edison's St. Clair Power Plant and Monroe Power Plant in Michigan.

== History ==
The ship was built for American Steamship in 1977 and originally named Belle River. It was renamed Walter J. McCarthy Jr. in 1990 for the former Chairman of Detroit Edison Company.

On January 14, 2008, MV Walter J. McCarthy Jr. collided with a submerged object while docking at Hallett Dock No. 8 in Superior, Wisconsin. The collision created a 7 by 4 feet (2.1 by 1.2 m) gash in the hull causing the engine room to flood. The ship partially sank with the stern resting on the bottom in 20 feet (6.1 m) of water. In February 2013, a federal jury awarded American Steamship Company (ASC) $4.7 million for repairs and lost profits in their lawsuit against Hallett Dock Company. According to ASC, repairs cost nearly $4.2 million, 45 shipping days and five cargo hauls before it could be returned to service resulting in just over a half million in lost profits.

In January 2022, one of the ship's crew was injured in an accident off the coast of Gary, Indiana then later died due to the injury while in transit to the hospital.
