= River-class freighter =

Type of bulk carrier designed for service on the Great Lakes

The River class is a type of bulk carrier designed for service on the Cuyahoga River and any other river on the Great Lakes. The River class is any freighter of 650 feet (200 m) in length or less. The first River-class vessels were Calumet, Paul Thayer and Wolverine, all built in 1973, followed by Buffalo, Sam Laud and American Republic which were all built in 1974. Mark W. Barker, the latest of the class entered service for the Interlake Steamship Company on 27 July 2022.

== History ==
In April 2019, it was announced that Interlake had ordered a single River-class ship from Fincantieri Bay Shipbuilding of Sturgeon Bay, Wisconsin. The vessel was the first new ship ordered by Interlake since 1981, and the first Great Lakes bulker built on the Great Lakes since 1983. Construction began in August 2019, when the first steel was cut. The ship was built in modular sections, the first of which were joined together at a ceremonial keel laying in June 2020. At the event, Interlake announced that she would be named MV Mark W. Barker, the ship was commissioned on 1 September 2022

== Design ==
The River-class vessel Mark W. Barker was designed by Interlake, Fincantieri Bay, and Bay Engineering, and measures 639 feet (195 m) long, with a beam of 78 feet (24 m) and a draft of 45 feet (14 m). It has a deadweight tonnage of 28,000 DWT, with a unique cargo hold and hatch design that allows for the transport of both bulk raw materials and large individual cargo. As a self-unloading ship, a bow-mounted conveyor system that is 249 feet (76 m) long is installed for offloading of bulk materials. Ship propulsion power is about 7,800 horsepower (5,800 kW) from two diesel engines—EMD 710s on Mark W. Baker—and electrical power totals 3,440 kilowatts (4,610 hp) from a genset and a shaft-mounted generator on each main engine. A single propeller gives the ship a service speed of about 15 miles per hour (13 kn; 24 km/h).
