= USS Munising =

Patrol vessel of the United States Navy

History

United States
- Name: USS Munising (PC-1228)
- Namesake: Munising, Michigan
- Builder: Leathern D. Smith Shipbuilding Co.; Sturgeon Bay, Wisconsin
- Laid down: 20 December 1942
- Launched: 10 March 1943
- Commissioned: 12 July 1943
- Decommissioned: March 1946
- Reclassified: 20 August 1945, PCC-1230
- Fate: Pacific Reserve Fleet, 15 February 1956

General characteristics
- Class & type: Submarine chaser
- Displacement: 280 long tons (280 t) (standard); 450 long tons (460 t) (full load)
- Length: 173 ft (53 m)
- Beam: 23 feet (7.0 m)
- Draft: 10 feet 10 inches (3.30 m)
- Propulsion: 2 x 2,880bhp General Motors 16-258S diesel engines
- Speed: 20.2 knots (23.2 mph; 37.4 km/h)
- Complement: 65
- Armament: 1 × 3 in (76 mm)/50 cal; 1 × 40 mm gun; 3 × 20 mm cannons; 2 × rocket launchers; 4 × depth charge throwers; 2 × depth charge tracks

USS Munising (PC-1228) was a PC-461-class submarine chaser of the United States Navy, named for the town of Munising in the Upper Peninsula of Michigan. For the entirety of its active service, the ship was known by its hull number PC-1228.

PC-1228 was laid down by the Leathem D. Smith Shipbuilding Company in Sturgeon Bay, Wisconsin on 7 September 1942 and launched 18 November 1942, sponsored by Mrs. C. R. Christianson. The ship was transferred down the Mississippi River to New Orleans, where it arrived on 19 May 1943 and was commissioned on 21 May 1943.

After a shakedown cruise along the Gulf Coast, PC-1228 underwent anti-submarine warfare training out of Miami during June before being sent to the Eastern Sea Frontier for duty 28 June. During the next several months the ship conducted anti-submarine patrols and escorted ships along the Atlantic and Gulf coasts. On 26 November PC-1228 was ordered to steam to the Canal Zone, where it arrived in Coco Solo on 5 December. The ship patrolled the coastal waters of the Panama Canal Zone for the remainder of World War II.

With the end of the war, PC-1228 returned to the United States. The ship was sent into reserve on 24 May 1946 and was decommissioned at Green Cove Springs, Florida on 19 July 1946. On 15 February 1956, while still berthed with the Atlantic Reserve Fleet, the ship was named Munising. The aging vessel was struck from the navy register on 5 September 1957 and breaking up on 1 July 1958 to the Boston Metals Company of Baltimore, Maryland.
