= MV American Century =

Large diesel-powered vessel built in 1981

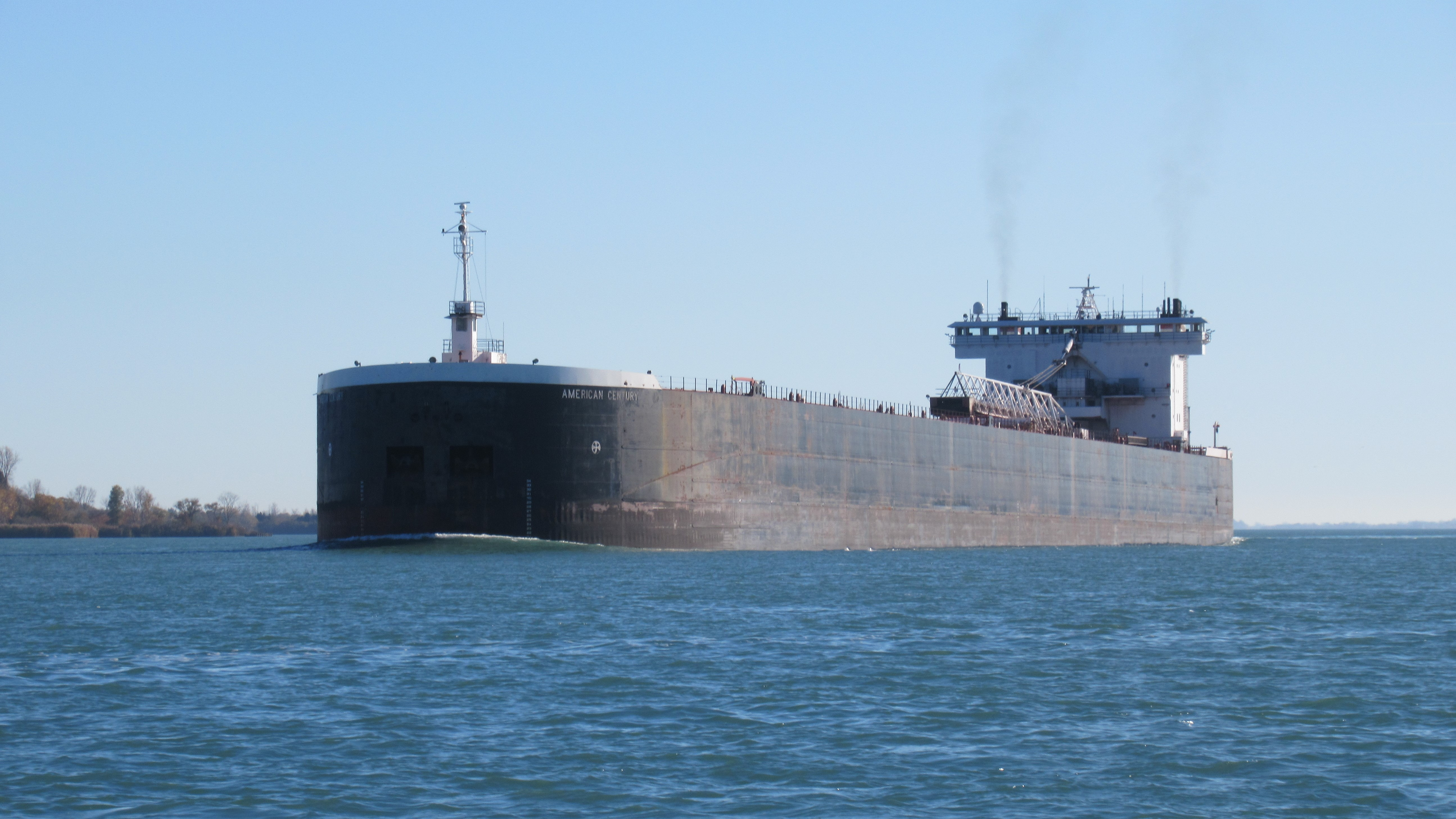
- American Century traveling along the Detroit River

History

United States
- Name: MV American Century
- Operator: American Steamship Company
- Builder: Bay Shipbuilding Company
- Yard number: 726
- Launched: 1981
- Identification: Call sign: WDD2876; IMO number: 7923196
- Status: In service

General characteristics
- Class & type: Lake freighter
- Tonnage: 35,923 gross tonnage; 33,534 net tonnage
- Length: 1,000 feet (305 m) (overall); 988.8 feet (301 m)
- Beam: 105 ft (32 m)
- Draft: 34.75 ft (10.59 m) (Midsummer Draft); 56.7 ft (17.3 m) (hull depth)
- Propulsion: four 3500 HP General Motors Electro Motive Division (EMD) diesel engines, 14,000 SHP

MV American Century is a very large diesel-powered Lake freighter owned and operated by the American Steamship Company. This vessel was built in 1981 at Bay Shipbuilding Company, Sturgeon Bay, Wisconsin, and included self-unloading technology.

The ship is 1,000 feet (304.8 m) long and 105 feet (32 m) wide, with a carrying capacity of 80,900 tons (at midsummer draft), either coal or iron ore.

== History ==
The ship was built for Oglebay Norton Corporation in 1981 and named Columbia Star. The name Columbia was selected for the brig Columbia that sailed through the St. Mary's Falls Canal carrying the first load of iron ore shipped through the canal. Star was commonly used by Oglebay Norton. American Century made its first voyage in May 1981 to on-load iron ore in Silver Bay, Minnesota. American Steamship Company acquired American Century in 2006.
