= American Steamship Company =

American transportation company

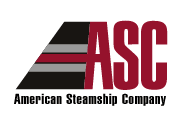
- Industry: Freight transport
- Founded: 1907 in Buffalo, New York
- Headquarters: 500 Essjay Road; Williamsville, New York 14221
- Parent: Mainstay Maritime, Inc.
- Website: http://www.americansteamship.com, https://www.mainstaymaritime.com

The American Steamship Company (ASC) is an American transportation company that operates a fleet of self-unloading vessels in the Great Lakes. The company is currently owned by Mainstay Maritime, Inc.

== History ==
The American Steamship Company was founded in 1907 in Buffalo, New York by partners John J. Boland and Adam E. Cornelius. Their first ship, the SS Yale was the first steel vessel owned by a Buffalo firm and earned large profits for the partners. Over the next five years, the company added six new vessels to their fleet.

At the end of World War I, the American Steamship Company became the first Great Lakes steamship company to outfit all of its vessels with radio telegraph equipment.

ASC acquired the Buffalo Steamship Company in 1922, thus adding another four vessels to its growing fleet.

ASC was hard hit by the Great Depression, but took advantage of the downturn to convert three of its bulk freighters to self-unloading vessels, which would prove to be the way of the future in Great Lakes shipping. In the 1940s, self-unloaders would bring new business to ASC, and the focus of the company would shift from transporting iron ore and grain to shipping coal and limestone. During World War II, ASC was active in the war effort, at one point having twenty ships engaged in war trades around the world.

The company embarked on a major expansion in the 1950s, though the company continued to be run by Boland and Cornelius and their sons. By 1965, ASC's annual volume exceeded 20 million tons, and in 1967 the firm acquired the Oswego Shipping Company. The company again launched an expansion effort and used funds provided under the Merchant Marine Act of 1970 to retire older tonnage and begin construction of a new fully modernized fleet of ten vessels. In 1973, the Boland and Cornelius families sold ASC to the General American Transportation Corporation (GATX), which oversaw completion of the newbuild program.

In the late 1970s and early 1980s, ASC became one of the first shipping companies to introduce onboard computers on all of its vessels.

From 2002 to 2006, the company partnered with Oglebay Norton Marine Services to create a combined "Alliance Fleet" of 18 US-Flagged vessels operating on the Great Lakes, making it the largest American domestic provider of dry bulk self-unloader transportation services on the Great Lakes. In 2006 following the completion of bankruptcy proceedings surrounding Oglebay Norton and its holdings, ASC divested several smaller vessels from the former Oglebay fleet while acquiring two additional 1,000 foot vessels and one smaller "River Class" vessel from the former company, which then formed the basis of the subsequent 11-vessel fleet for the next decade.

On February 7, 2020, GATX announced on their corporate website that an agreement for the sale of American Steamship Company had been reached and was pending regulatory approval before proceeding. On May 17, 2020 it was announced that the buyer was American Industrial Partners (AIP), a hedge fund group that had purchased RAND Logistics Inc and their subsidiary fleets of Grand River Navigation and Lower Lakes Towing as they emerged from bankruptcy proceedings.

In early 2021, Rand Logistics Inc. chartered out the operations of ASC's five smaller "River Class" Vessels to Grand River Navigation as a cost-cutting measure, while retaining the six 1,000 foot vessels under ASC operational ownership. As of January 2023, ASC continues to operate its six 1,000 foot vessels as part of the combined Rand Logistics Group. In 2026 Rand Logistics, Inc rebranded itself to Mainstay Maritime, Inc.

== Current fleet ==
- M/V American Century - Formerly the Oglebay Norton/Columbia Transportation American Courage/V Columbia Star (1981-2006)
- M/V American Integrity - Formerly the Oglebay Norton M/V Lewis Wilson Foy (1978-1991), M/V Oglebay Norton (1991-2006)
- M/V American Spirit - Formerly the National Steel M/V George Stinson (1978-2004)
- M/V Burns Harbor
- M/V Indiana Harbor
- M/V Walter J. McCarthy Jr. - Formerly the M/V Belle River (1977-1990)
- M/V American Courage - Formerly the Fred R. White Jr. (1979-2006)

== Former Fleet ==
- M/V St. Clair - Scrapped 2022 following a fire while in layup at Toledo, OH in 2019
- M/V American Mariner - Now operated by Grand River Navigation
- M/V H. Lee White - Now operated by Grand River Navigation
- M/V John J. Boland - Now operated by Grand River Navigation
- M/V Sam Laud - Now operated by Grand River Navigation
- M/V American Courage - Now operated by Grand River Navigation
- M/V Buffalo - Now operated by Algoma Central Marine
- M/V Adam E. Cornelius - Now operated by Algoma Central Marine
- M/V American Valor - Now operated by Lower Lakes Towing, laid up in Toledo, Ohio
- M/V American Victory - Sold to Algoma Central in December 2017 and scrapped June 2018

== See also ==
- Boland and Cornelius Company
