= Lake freighter =

North American Great Lakes ship

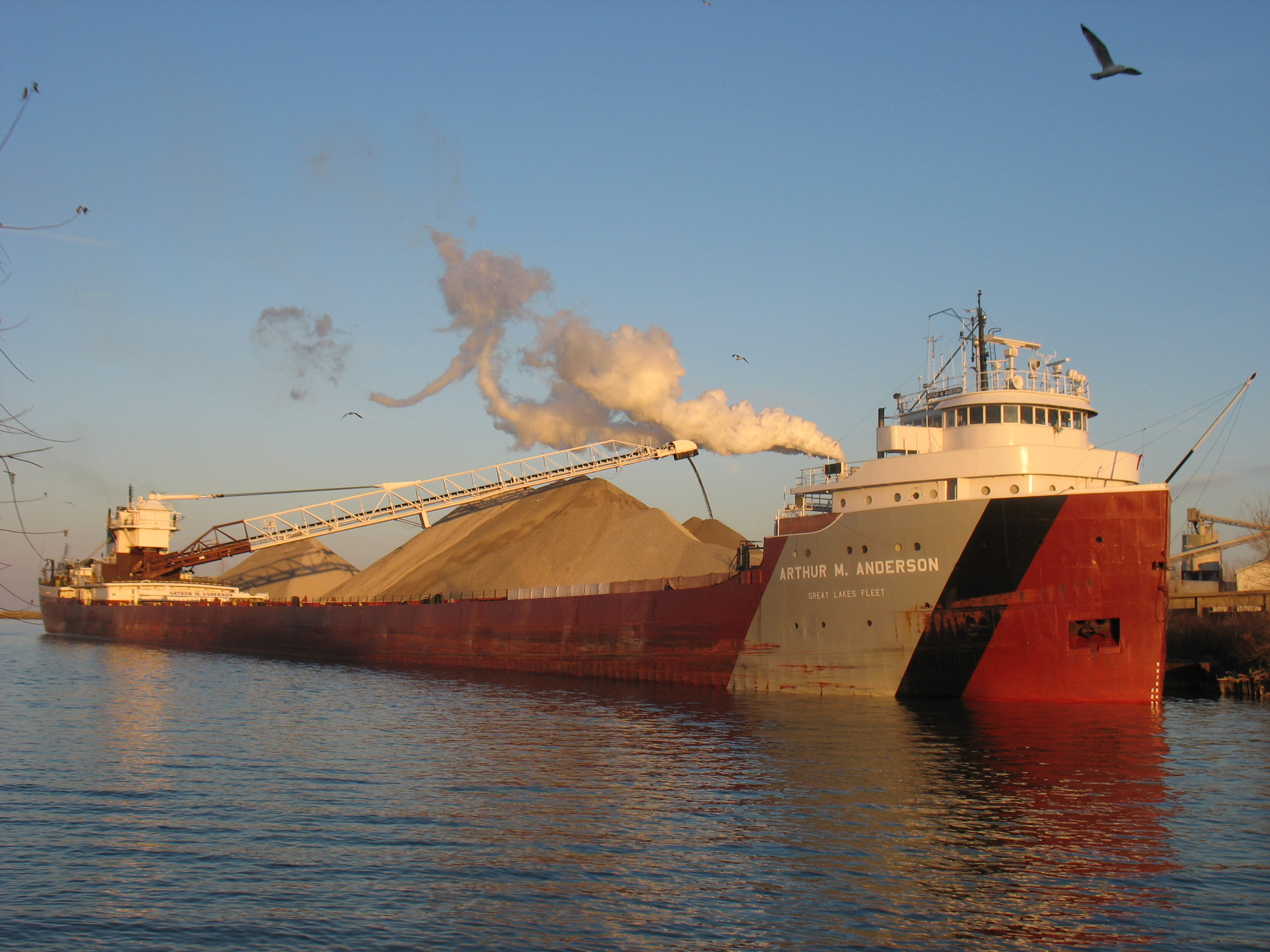
SS Arthur M. Anderson, with pilothouse forward and engine room astern, also equipped with a self-unloading boom.

Lake freighters, also called lakers, are bulk carriers operating on the Great Lakes of North America. Lakers have been used since the late 19th century to haul raw material from docks in the Great Lakes and St Lawrence Seaway regions to the industrial centers of Ontario, Quebec, and the American Midwest. The navigation season typically runs from late March through the following mid-January due to the formation of ice on the lakes.The largest lake freighters can travel up to 15 knots (28 km/h; 17 mph) and can carry as much as 78,850 long tons (80,120 t) of bulk cargo.

Freighters typically have a long, narrow hull, a raised pilothouse, and the engine located at the rear of the ship. The lake freighter's recognizable design emerged from years of innovation in Great Lakes shipping and blended two distinct styles of ship. These vessels are traditionally called boats, despite being technically classified as ships.

SS Edmund Fitzgerald, which sank in 1975, became widely known as the largest vessel to be wrecked on the Great Lakes.

== History ==
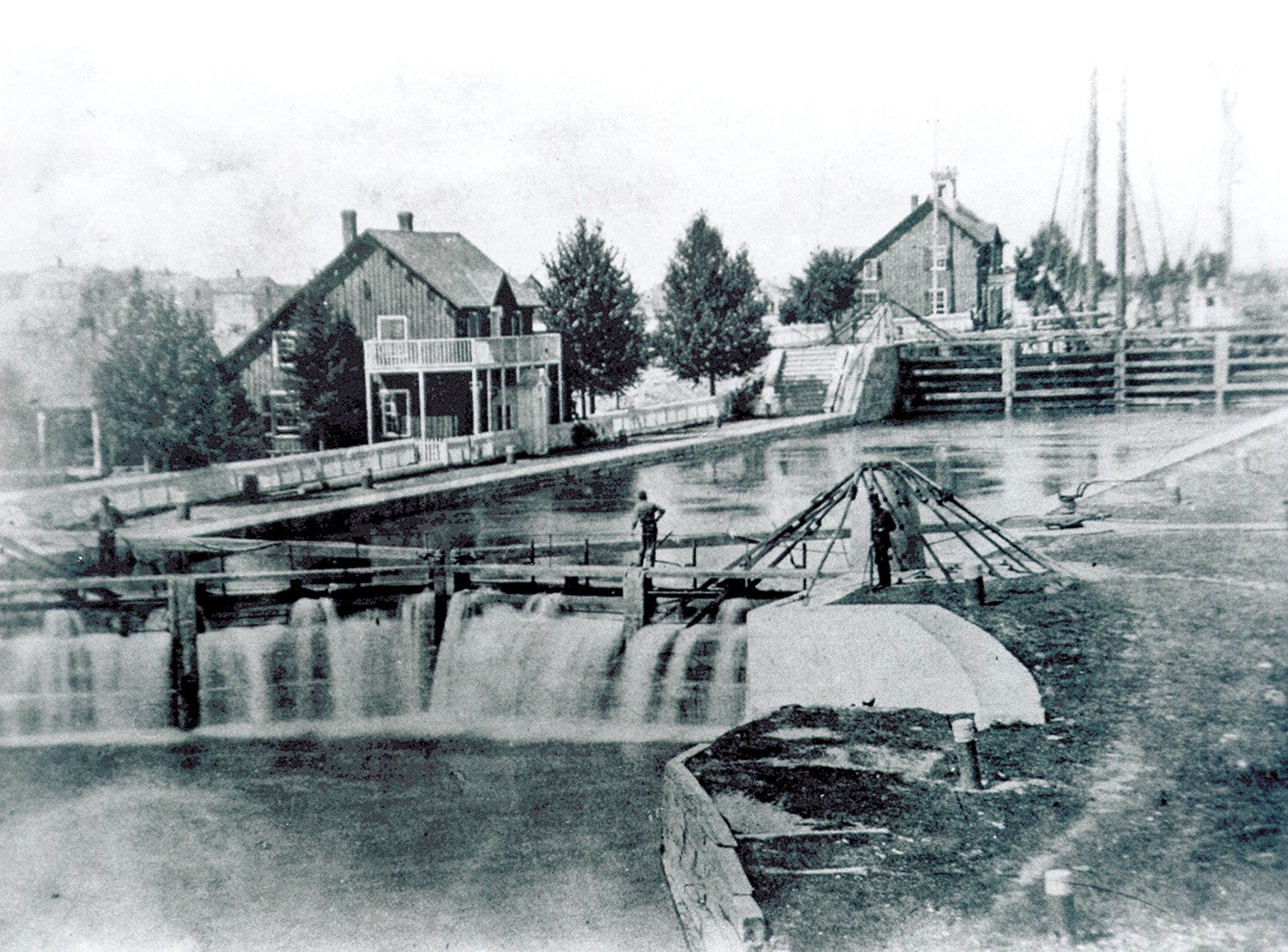
The State Lock at the Michigan State Locks (now Soo Locks)

=== Background ===
The bulk shipping industry on the Great Lakes ballooned during the 1840s and 1850s. Grain was in high demand and copper and iron ore was discovered in Michigan's Upper Peninsula and Minnesota. Shipping ore at this time was not profitable. The falls of the St. Marys River forced ships to haul their cargo 1.25 miles (2.01 km) around the falls.

In an effort to increase shipping efficiency and profitability, Michigan representatives began to appeal to the federal government for funding to build a canal in 1837. Support for the canal finally came in 1853 and two years later the Michigan State Locks (known as the Soo Locks) opened. Two 350-foot-long locks lowered ships from the elevation of Lake Superior to that of the St. Marys River. In 1855, 1,400 tons of material passed through the Soo Locks and the following year it climbed to 11,500 tons.

By the late 1860s, most bulk cargo on the Great Lakes was still carried by unpowered barges and sailing ships. Often, these ships had accessible deck hatches, useful for loading and unloading cargo. Also around this time, passenger steamboats were gaining popularity for their steam-powered shipping abilities, which were faster and more reliable.

=== Development of the lake freighter ===
Shipbuilders wished to combine the open, uncluttered decks of the sailing ships and barges with the benefits of steam-powered transport. The first prototype ship designed in this fashion was the R. J. Hackett, launched in 1869. The ship was designed with a raised pilothouse at the bow and engines in the back, separated by a long deck lined with hatches. Cabins were situated near the engine and below the pilothouse. The ship had been designed specifically for the iron ore trade. The boxy hull and contiguous hold maximized carrying capacity with hatches spaced 24 feet (7.3 m) apart to match the chutes of the ore dock in Marquette, Michigan.

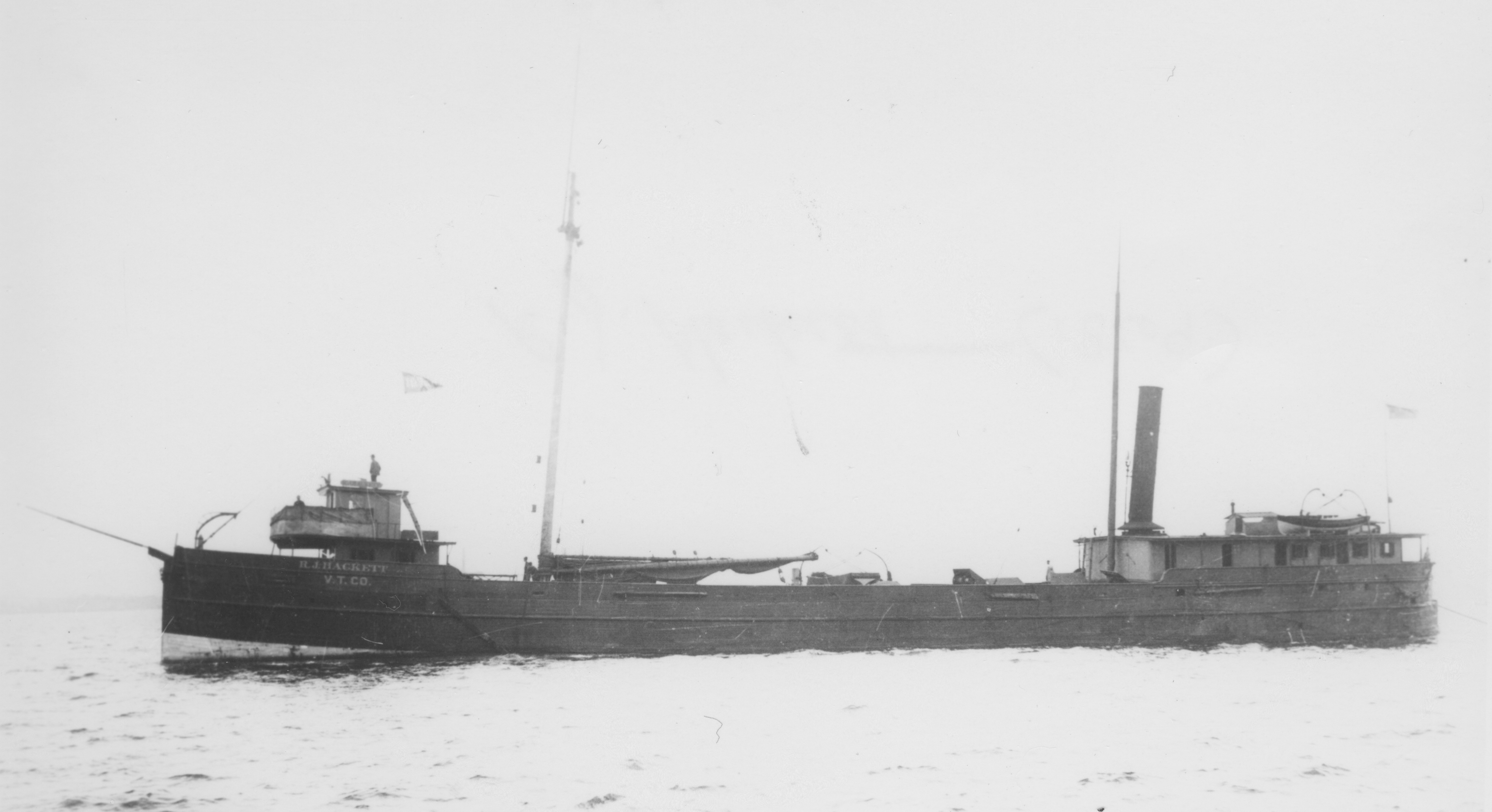
The R. J. Hackett, the first modern Great Lakes bulk freighter

Early lakers often had a wooden hull, or a composite hull consisting of an oak frame wrapped in iron plating. With the depletion of high-quality timber near the lakeshore, shipbuilders increasingly opted for metal hulls. In 1881 and 1882, the first entirely iron-hulled freighters, Brunswick and Onoko, launched.

Around this time, steel was quickly becoming a standard hull material as a result of the Bessemer process making it more affordable. The first steel-hulled freighter, Spokane, launched in 1886. Soon both iron and composite hulls were phased out. Wood was used for smaller vessels into the early 1900s.

The early lake freighters required cargo to be manually unloaded, or with assistance from unloading machinery at the docks. In 1902, the Hennepin was the first ship retrofitted with self-unloading equipment, allowing cargo to be landed in a fraction of the time. Ship operators were slow to adopt the new equipment, but increasingly opted for it over dockside machinery. Built or retrofitted self-unloaders slowly gained popularity through the 1920s.

Around 1916, 600-foot (180 m) vessels more or less became the standard size.

Ford Motor Company's Henry Ford II and Benson Ford of 1924 were the first lake freighters with diesel engines.

After World War II, several oceangoing freighters and tankers were transported to the Great Lakes and converted to bulk carriers as a way to acquire ships cheaply. The oil tanker Chiwawa became the bulk freighter MV Lee A. Tregurtha In addition, the freighter Outer Island was originally commissioned as LCT-203 for use as a tank landing craft during World War II.

In the mid-20th century, 300 lakers worked the lakes, but by the early 21st century, there were fewer than 140 active. By the 1990s, older and smaller self-unloaders and straight-deck freighters were converted into tug-barges.

Algosoo (1974–2015 730 ft, 220 m) was the last laker built in the classic style.

=== Landmark vessels ===
Name	Launched	Notes	Ref.
R. J. Hackett	1869	Prototype ship considered the first lake freighter with a forward pilothouse, a long flat deck, and engine room aft.	
Brunswick	1881	First iron-hulled lake freighter.	
Onoko	1882	Followed Brunswick in advancing the design of what would become the Great Lakes boat.	
Spokane	1886	First steel-hulled lake freighter.	
Hennepin	1888	The first ship retrofitted to have self-unloading equipment in 1902.	
Western Reserve	1890	First steel bulk carrier of the classic Great Lakes design (superstructures at bow and stern). Sank in a storm in 1892.	
Wyandotte	1908	First ship built as a self-unloader.	
Henry Ford II	1924	First lake freighters with diesel engines.	
Benson Ford	1924	First lake freighters with diesel engines.	
S. T. Crapo	1927	The last coal-fired freighter on the Great Lakes. In 1995, the ship's boiler was converted to be oil-firing. The 95-year-old ship was scrapped in 2022.	
Feux-Follets	1967	Last ship to be built with a steam turbine.	
Stewart J. Cort	1972	First 1,000-footer lake freighter. Originally Hull 1173 and nicknamed "Stubby," the ship only consisted of the bow and stern sections. It was then sailed to Erie, Pennsylvania and lengthened by over 700 feet.	
Presque Isle	1973	The first 1,000-foot integrated tugboat/barge and the second 1,000 footer overall.	
James R. Barker	1976	First standard construction 1,000-footer.	
Edwin H. Gott	1978	The most powerful freighter when launched with two engines rated at 19,500 brake horsepower (14,500 kW) each. In 2011, it was repowered with two engines rated at 9,650 bhp (7,200 kW) each.	
Paul R. Tregurtha	1981	The largest ship currently on the lakes at 1,013.5 feet (308.9 m).	

== Categories ==
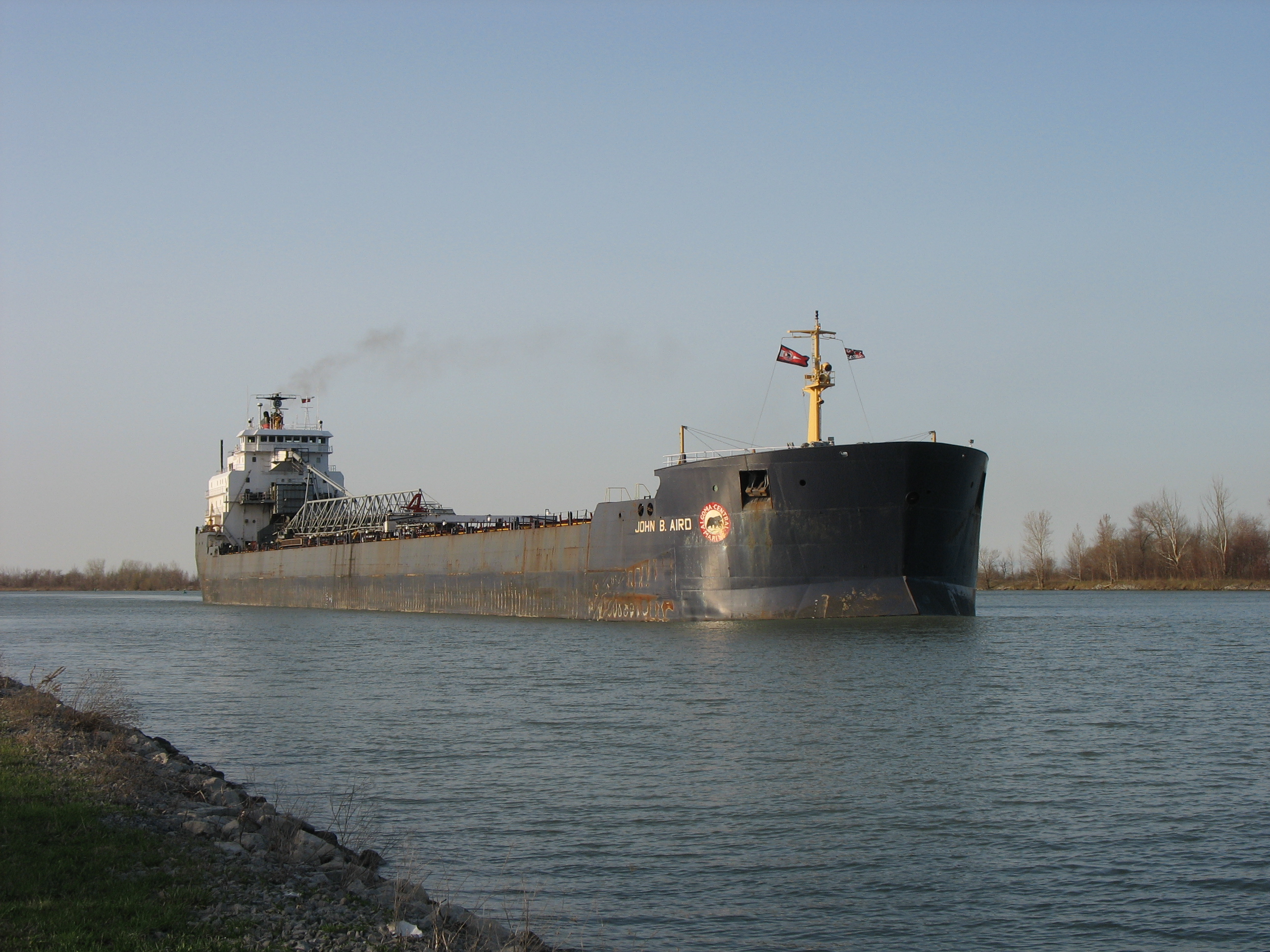
MV John B. Aird, a laker with a single aft superstructure.

The many lake freighters operating on the Great Lakes can be differentiated by how they are used. They may be classified according to where they work, their design, their size, or other factors. The ships are not always exclusive to one category. These types include:

- Longboat – a laker noted for its slender appearance.
- Oreboat/Ironboat – a bulk carrier used primarily to transport iron ore and taconite pellets.
- Saltie – ocean-going, seawaymax vessels that access the Great Lakes through the Saint Lawrence Seaway.
- Self-unloader – a lake freighter equipped with self-unloading gear.
- Stern-ender – a lake freighter with all cabins aft.
- Straight decker (bulker) – a freighter built without conveyors and cranes to offload cargo, instead using port facilities.
- Tug-barge - a bulk carrier created by pairing barges (former self-unloaders and straight-deckers) with a tugboat.
- Seawaymax - a bulk carrier built to the largest dimensions still affording transit through the St Lawrence Seaway.

Some of the newer classes of lake freighters include:

- Equinox class – a new class of lake freighter, several of which entered service in the 2010s for Seaway Marine Transport, a division of Algoma Central. A class of vessel is created any time a new design is used to build a ship and is notable when multiple ships are built to the same design plans. The ships are used as dry-bulk lake freighters (two gearless bulk freighter and three self-unloading vessel). The first in the series, Algoma Equinox, was launched in 2013.
- Trillium class – a new class of lake freighter delivered for Canada Steamship Lines in 2012 (Baie St. Paul) and 2013 (Whitefish Bay, Thunder Bay and Baie Comeau). An additional pair (CSL Welland and CSL St. Laurent) began service on the Great Lakes in 2015.
- River class – a new class of lake freighter, one of which, Mark W. Barker, was commissioned by Interlake Steamship Company and entered service on July 1, 2022.

== Cargo ==
Average yearly cargoes 2018–2022 (million tons)
Iron ore	42.3
Coal	10.0
Limestone	22.9
Cement	3.4
Salt	0.9
Sand	0.5
Grain	0.3
Total	80.4
Source: "Cargo Reports – Year-in-Review 2023 – U.S.-Flag Vessels"

In 2023, 81.4 million tons of cargo were shipped on the Great Lakes. The most common cargoes include iron ore, limestone, grain, salt, coal, cement, gypsum, and sand. The cargo is carried in large contiguous holds, not packed into containers.

Destination harbors, ship sizes, and legal restrictions greatly affect the pattern of haulage. Large U.S. ships hauled most of the iron ore on the lakes (79%) from U.S. mines to U.S. mills. This reflects the requirement of the Jones Act, as well as the industry using large volumes of material while being concentrated in a few large harbor locations. Salt and Canadian grain can be hauled to numerous smaller ports of either country on smaller, mostly Canadian, ships, which can also enter the St. Lawrence Seaway with the Canadian ports of Montreal and Quebec City.

The iron ore transported from the upper Great Lakes primarily supplies the steel mills of the Midwest. Iron ore makes up a majority of the cargo shipped annually. The 1940s saw the rise in the use of taconite pellets, as sources of higher quality ore diminished.

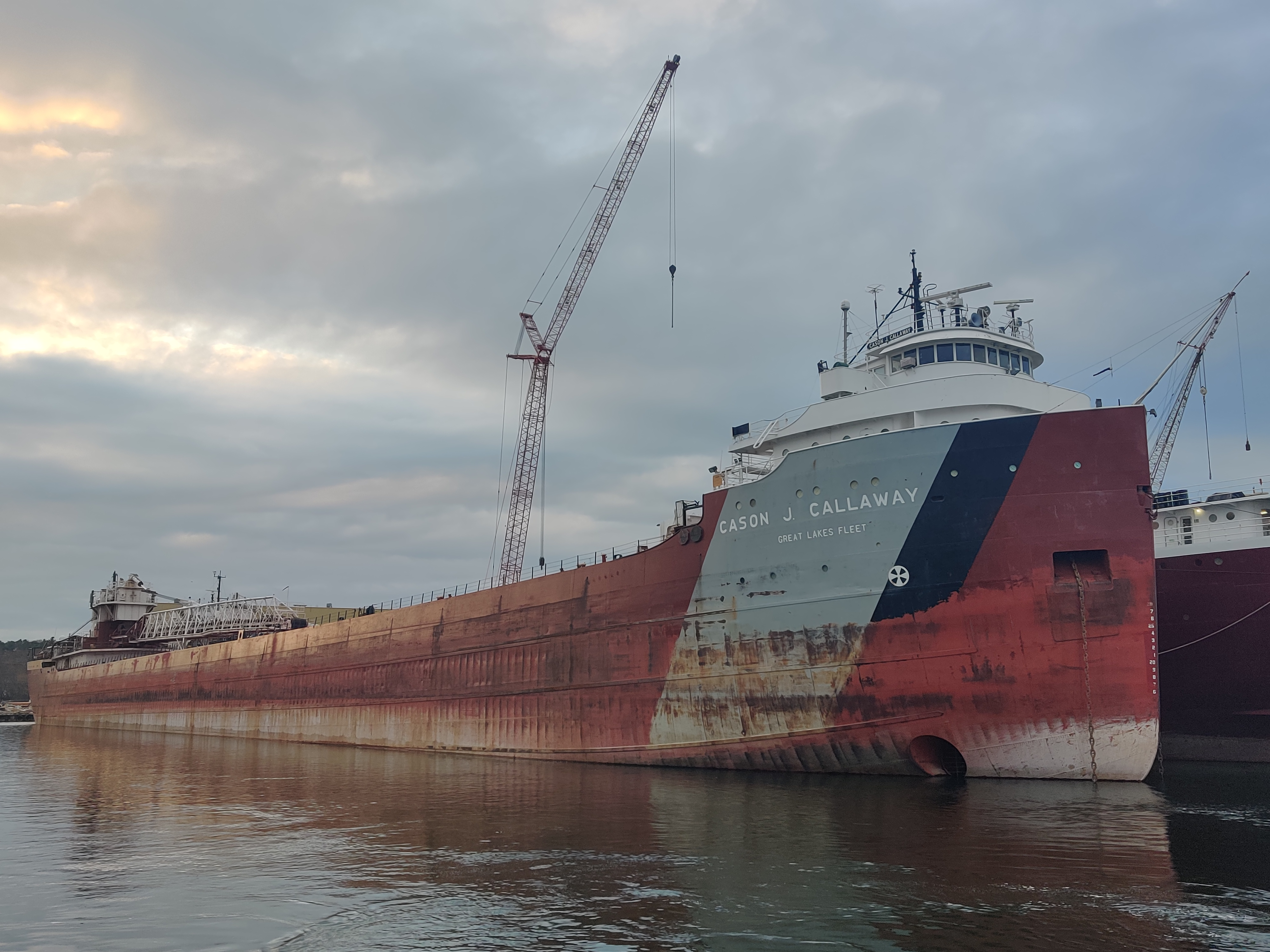
Cason J. Callaway laid up in Sturgeon Bay, Wisconsin. (2021)

Other destinations include coal-fired power plants, highway department salt domes, and stone docks, where limestone is unloaded for the construction industry. U.S.-flagged freighters carried the largest portion of the trade, accounting for two-thirds of all cargo by weight. U.S. hulls carried most of the iron, limestone and cement, while Canadian boats carried most of the potash, and almost all of the salt and grain moved on the lakes.

Because of their deeper draft and freshwater's lower buoyancy, salties often take on partial loads. Conversely, the seaway allows smaller lakers to access the Atlantic Ocean. The larger, newer ships are restricted to the upper lakes.

== Design ==
Lakers feature a design distinct from their ocean-going counterparts. In part due to the R. J. Hackett (1869), lake freighters typically had the bridge and associated superstructure located at the bow with a second island located over the engine room in the stern. In 1974, Algosoo was the final vessel built this way on the Great Lakes.

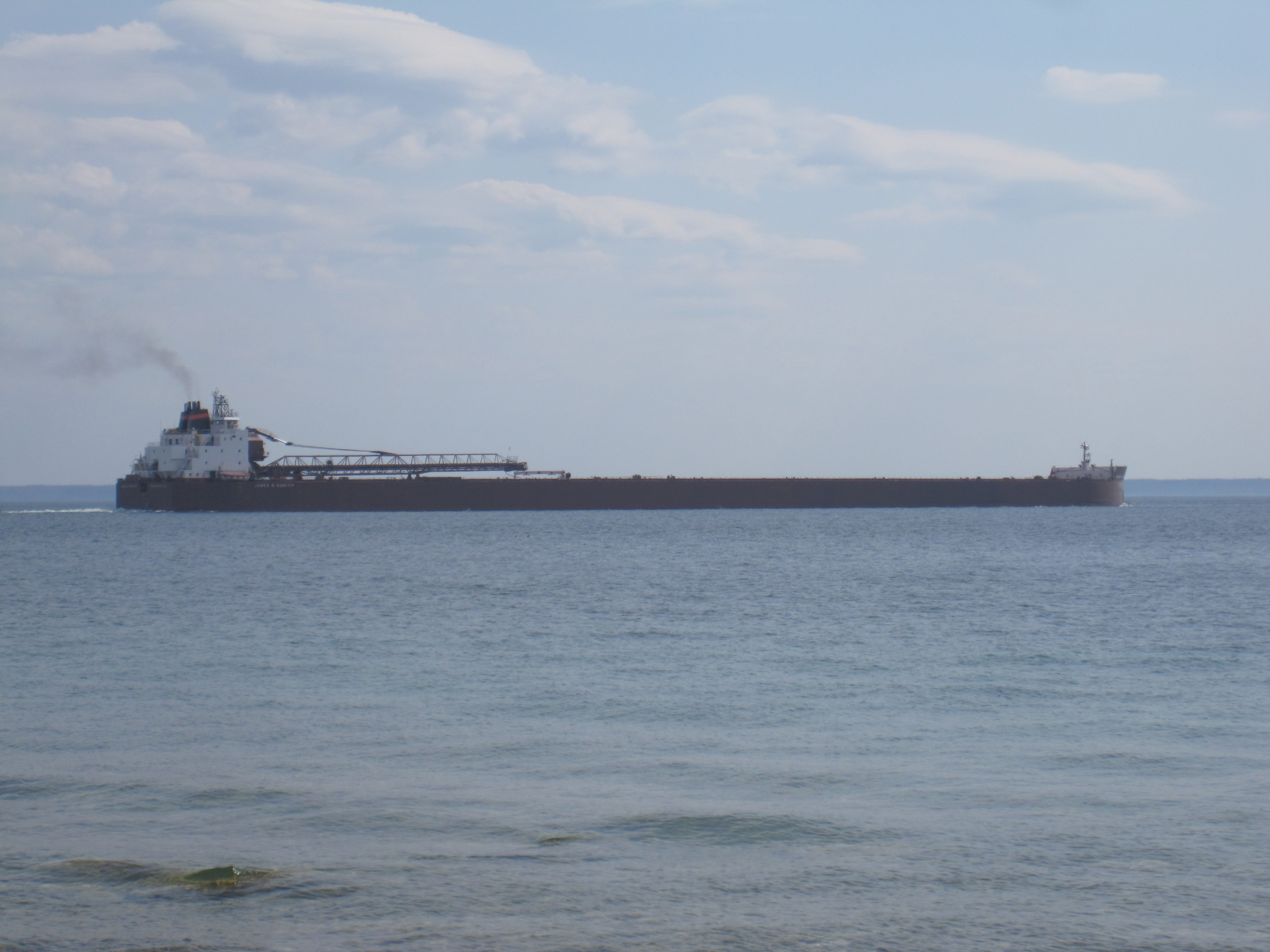
Freighter MV James R Barker passing through the Straits of Mackinac

Lake vessels are designed with the greatest block coefficient to maximize the vessel's size in the locks within the Great Lakes/St Lawrence Seaway system. Therefore, ship designers have favored bluff bows over streamlined bows.

Another distinguishing feature of lake vessels versus ocean vessels is the cargo hatch configuration. On the lake vessels, the hatches are traditionally spaced 24 feet (7.3 m) apart. This configuration was needed to match the chutes at loading facilities.

Since Great Lakes waves do not achieve the great length or period of ocean waves, particularly compared to the waves' height, ships are in less danger of being suspended between two waves and breaking, so the ratio between the ship's length, beam and its depth can be larger than that of an ocean-going ship. The lake vessels generally have a 10:1 length to beam ratio, whereas ocean vessels are typically 7:1.

Wilfred Sykes (1949 – 678 ft, 207 m) is considered to be the first of the modern lakers, and when converted to a self-unloader in 1975 was the first to have the equipment mounted aft. Since then all self-unloading equipment has been mounted aft.

Algoisle (formerly Silver Isle) (1962 – 715.9 ft, 218.2 m) was the first modern laker built with all cabins aft (a "stern-ender"), following the lead of ocean-going bulk carriers and reprising a century old form used by little river steam barges and the whalebacks.The more recently built lakers, like CSL Niagara, feature this single large superstructure island at the stern.

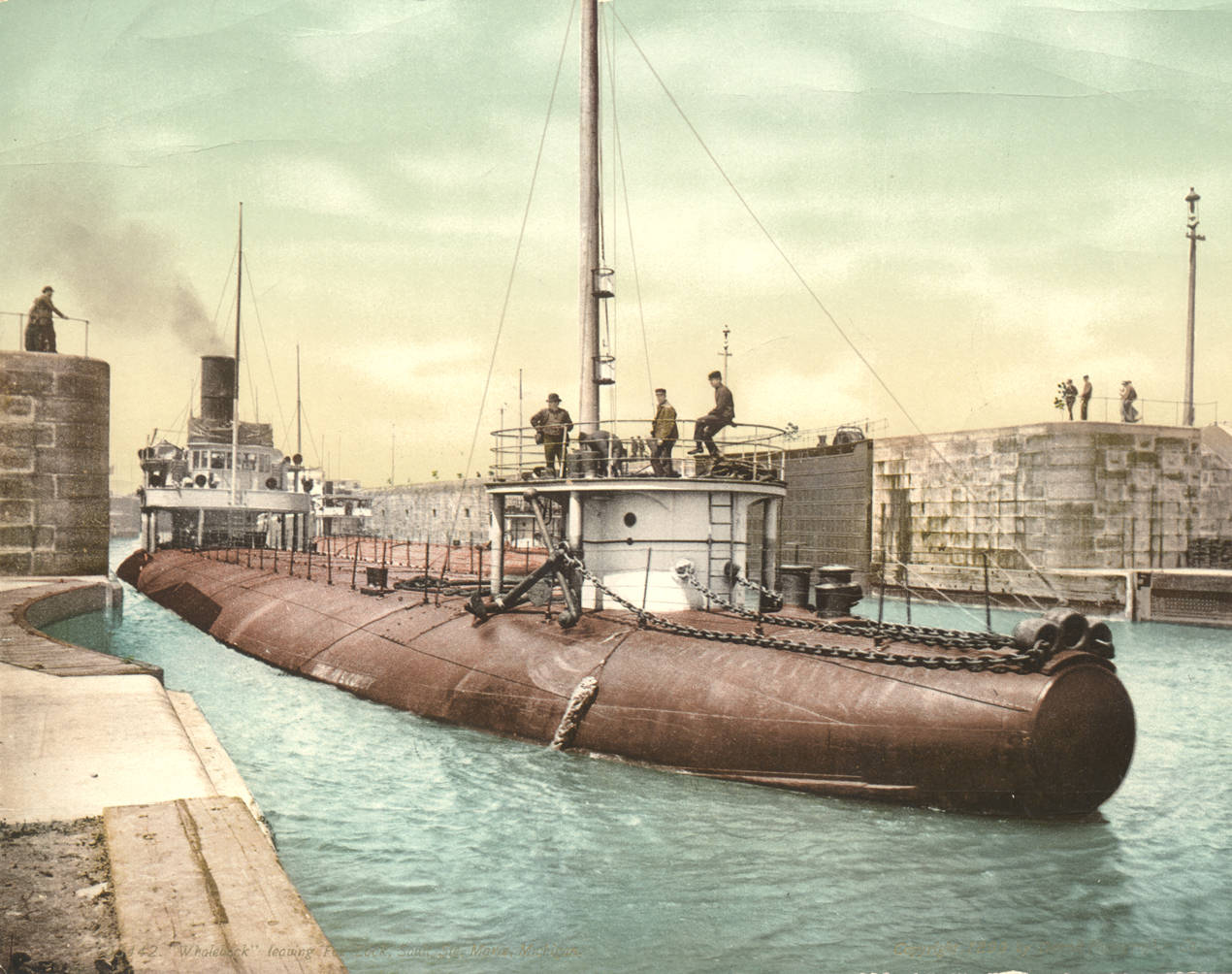
Whaleback Joseph L. Colby

An early variation on the lake freighter was the whaleback, designed by Alexander McDougall. These had cigar-shaped bodies that barely rose out of the water when fully loaded. These ships carried bulk cargo on the lakes from 1888 through 1970.

=== Lifespan ===
Modern lakers are usually designed for a 45-50 year service life, outlasting ocean-going bulk carriers. As of 2023, ocean-going bulk freighters average an 11-year lifespan, due in part to the corrosive effects of saltwater.

Some lake freighters have been known to have careers long exceeding this service life. The SS St. Marys Challenger launched in 1906 and still floats as a bulk cement barge (the ship has not sailed independently since 2013). Similarly, the E. M. Ford had the longest career on the Great Lakes when it went to scrap in November 2008 after 110 years afloat.

Some shipping companies are building new freighters to ply the waters of the Great Lakes. The Algoma Mariner, built by Chengxi Shipyard of Jiangyin, China, launched in August 2011 for Algoma Central Corporation.

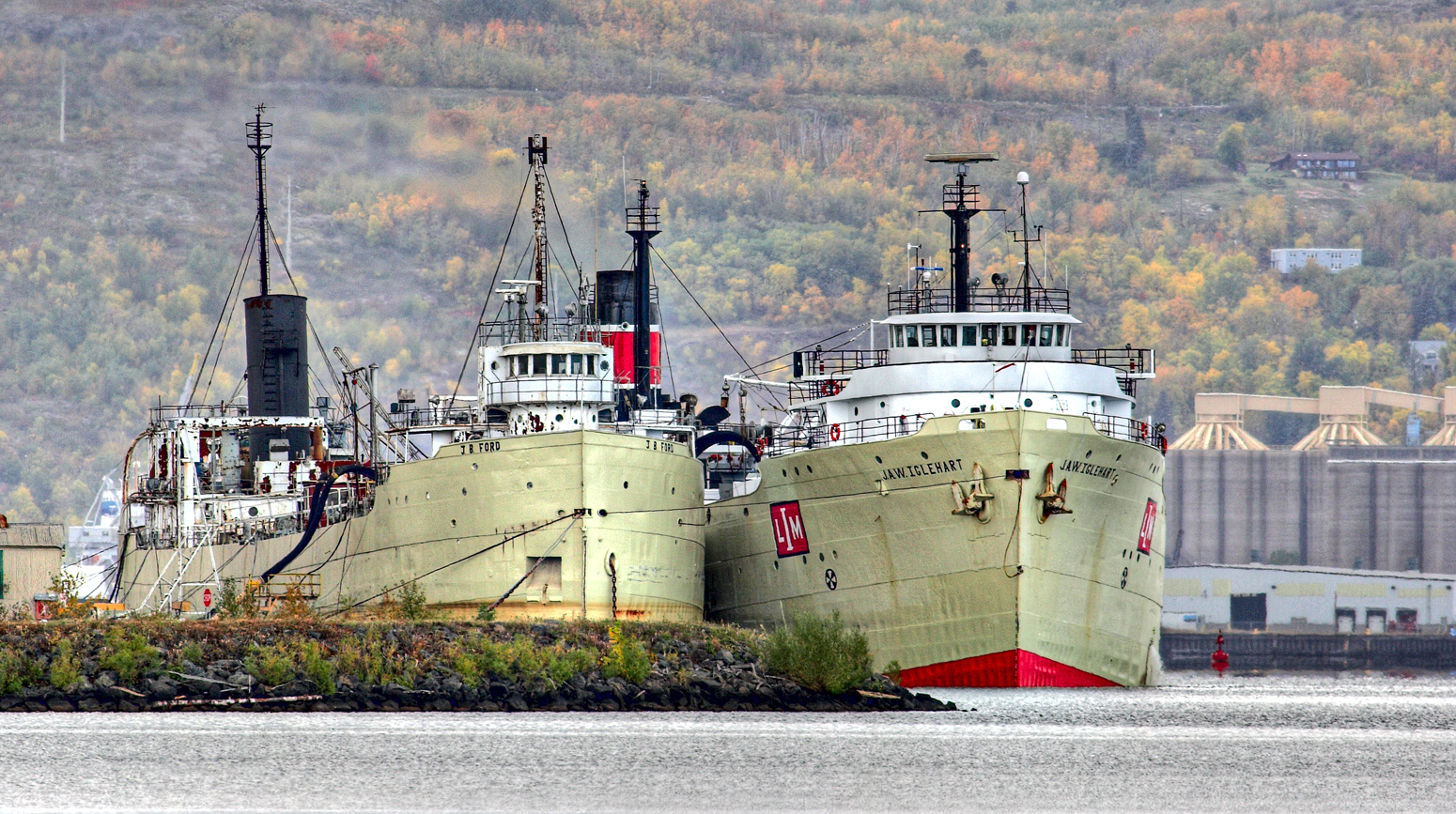
In 2006, J. B. Ford (left) in use for cement storage at age 102 with J. A. W. Iglehart (right) in her last month of a 70-year sailing career, which included surviving a U-boat attack in the Atlantic during World War II.

=== Size ===
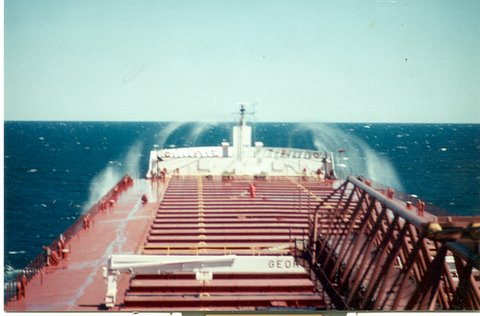
1000-footer George A. Stinson (now American Spirit) pounds through Lake Huron waves.

The size of a lake freighter determines where it may work. The shallow draft imposed by the St. Marys River and Lake St. Clair restrict the cargo capacity of lakers. Poe Lock at the Soo Locks is the largest deep lock at 1,200 feet (370 m) long and 110 feet (34 m) wide.

Many of the larger American ships are unable to navigate the locks of the St. Lawrence Seaway, which restricts vessel size to 740 feet (230 m) in length and 78 feet (24 m) in breadth. These seawaymax vessels can access the Great Lakes and the ocean.

Lake boats in the 600-and-700-foot (180 and 210 m) classes are more common, because of the limitations of the Welland Canal. These vessels vary greatly in configuration and cargo capacity, being capable of hauling between 10,000 and 40,000 tons per trip depending on the individual boat. The smaller boats serve smaller harbors around the lakes which have irregular need for their services.

Another reason for the lack of larger Canadian vessels is legislative in nature. Larger ships on the lakes are generally used to transport American-mined ore bound for American mills. Because of the Jones Act of 1920, only American ships can carry ore from American mines to American mills in American ports; ergo, larger Canadian ships are not needed.

==== 1000-footers ====
These are the largest vessels on the lakes. Thirteen were built between 1976 and 1981, and all remain in service today. They are all U.S.-flagged vessels between 1,000 and 1,013.5 feet (304.8 and 308.9 m) long, 105 feet (32 m) wide and of 56 ft (17 m) hull depth.

List of 1000-footers operating on the Great Lakes
Name	Year built	Type	Dimensions	Gross capacity	Notes	Ref.
American Integrity	1981	Self-unloader	1,000 ft × 105 ft	80,900 tons		
American Spirit	1978	Self-unloader	1,004 ft × 105 ft	62,400 tons		
American Century	1981	Self-unloader	1,000 ft × 105 ft	80,900 tons		
Edgar B. Speer	1980	Self-unloader	1,004 ft × 105 ft	80,900 tons		
Edwin H. Gott	1978	Self-unloader	1,000 ft × 105 ft	73,700 tons		
James R. Barker	1976	Self-unloader	1,000 ft × 105 ft	63,300 tons	First of the thousand footers to have all accommodations located in a single superstructure at the stern.	
Mesabi Miner	1977	Self-unloader	1,004 ft × 105 ft	63,300 tons	The fourth of the thirteen 1000-footers.	
Paul R. Tregurtha	1981	Self-unloader	1,013.5 ft × 105 ft	68,000 tons	Longest vessel operating on the Great Lakes.	
Stewart J. Cort	1972	Self-unloader	1,000 ft × 105 ft	58,000 tons	First 1000-foot vessel and the only one with a forward pilothouse, following the traditional Great Lakes style.	
Burns Harbor	1980	Self-unloader	1,000 ft × 105 ft	80,900 tons		
Indiana Harbor	1979	Self-unloader	1,000 ft × 105 ft	80,900 tons		
Walter J. McCarthy Jr.	1977	Self-unloader	1,000 ft × 105 ft	80,900 tons		
Presque Isle	1972	Tug/barge unit	1,000 ft × 104 ft 7 in	55,600 tons	Only 1000 ft tug/barge combination unit	

== Ship losses and incidents ==
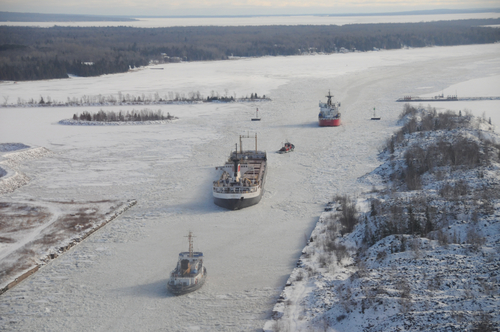
Cedarglen beset in ice during a December trip until freed by two US Coast Guard icebreakers.

The Great Lakes have a long history of shipwrecks, groundings, storms, and collisions. From the 1679 sinking of Le Griffon to the 1975 loss of Edmund Fitzgerald, thousands of ships and thousands of lives have been lost, many involving vessels in the cargo trade. The Great Lakes Shipwreck Museum uses the approximate numbers of 6,000 ships and 30,000 lives lost. David D. Swayze has compiled a list which details over 4,750 well-documented shipwrecks, mostly of commercial vessels and a list of known names of over 5,000 victims of those incidents. Maritime historian Mark Thompson reports that based on nautical records, nearly 6,000 shipwrecks on the Great Lakes occurred between 1878 and 1994, with about a quarter of those being listed as total losses with a total of 1,166 lives lost.

The most recent losses of modern lakers were:

- SS Edmund Fitzgerald, November 10, 1975, Lake Superior, 29 of 29 crew died, (unknown cause during a storm)
- SS Daniel J. Morrell, November 29, 1966, Lake Huron, 28 of 29 crew died, (split in half by hogging during a storm)
- SS Cedarville, May 7, 1965, Straits of Mackinac, 10 of 35 crew died, (collision with the saltie Topdalsfjord)
- SS Carl D. Bradley, November 18, 1958, Lake Michigan, 33 of 35 crew died, (split in half by hogging during a storm)
- SS Scotiadoc, June 20, 1953, Lake Superior, 1 of 29 crew died, (rammed by freighter Burlington in heavy fog)
- SS Henry Steinbrenner, May 11, 1953, Lake Superior, 17 of 31 crew died, (flooded after the cargo hatch covers were lost during a storm)
- SS Emperor, June 4, 1947, Lake Superior, 12 of 33 crew died, (ran into rocks at Isle Royale)
- SS Superior City, August 20, 1920, Lake Superior, 29 of 33 crew died, (collision with freighter Willis L. King)

The salties Prins Willem V and Monrovia sank in the Great Lakes during the 1950s; both in collisions with other ships. The saltie Francisco Morazan was a total loss after running aground off South Manitou Island on November 29, 1960. Another saltie Nordmeer grounded on Thunder Bay Island Shoal in November 1966, but before it could be refloated, it was further damaged in the same storm that sank the Morrell and was declared a total loss.

Ships on the lakes have been involved in many lesser incidents. Lakers have been subject to frequent groundings in ports and channels because of varying lake levels and silting, collisions with objects (such as the 1993 collision of the Indiana Harbor with the Lansing Shoals Light Station), icing in during winter trips and shipboard fires (including the unusual case in 2001 where a drawbridge ran into the Canadian grain carrier Windoc causing a fire). To prevent collisions and groundings, the Great Lakes are well-served with lighthouses and lights, and floating navigation aids. The U.S. Coast Guard and Canadian Coast Guard maintain stations around the Great Lakes including icebreakers and rescue helicopters. The U.S. Army Corps of Engineers and other agencies maintain the harbors and seaways to limit groundings by dredging and seawalling.

November was the traditional last month of shipping before the winter layup (and lake freeze-up). During November, much of the worst weather of the navigation season occurs which has resulted in a disproportionate number of accidents. One study shows over half of all strandings and one-third of all vessels lost to foundering between 1900 and 1950 were lost during November.

== Notable vessels ==
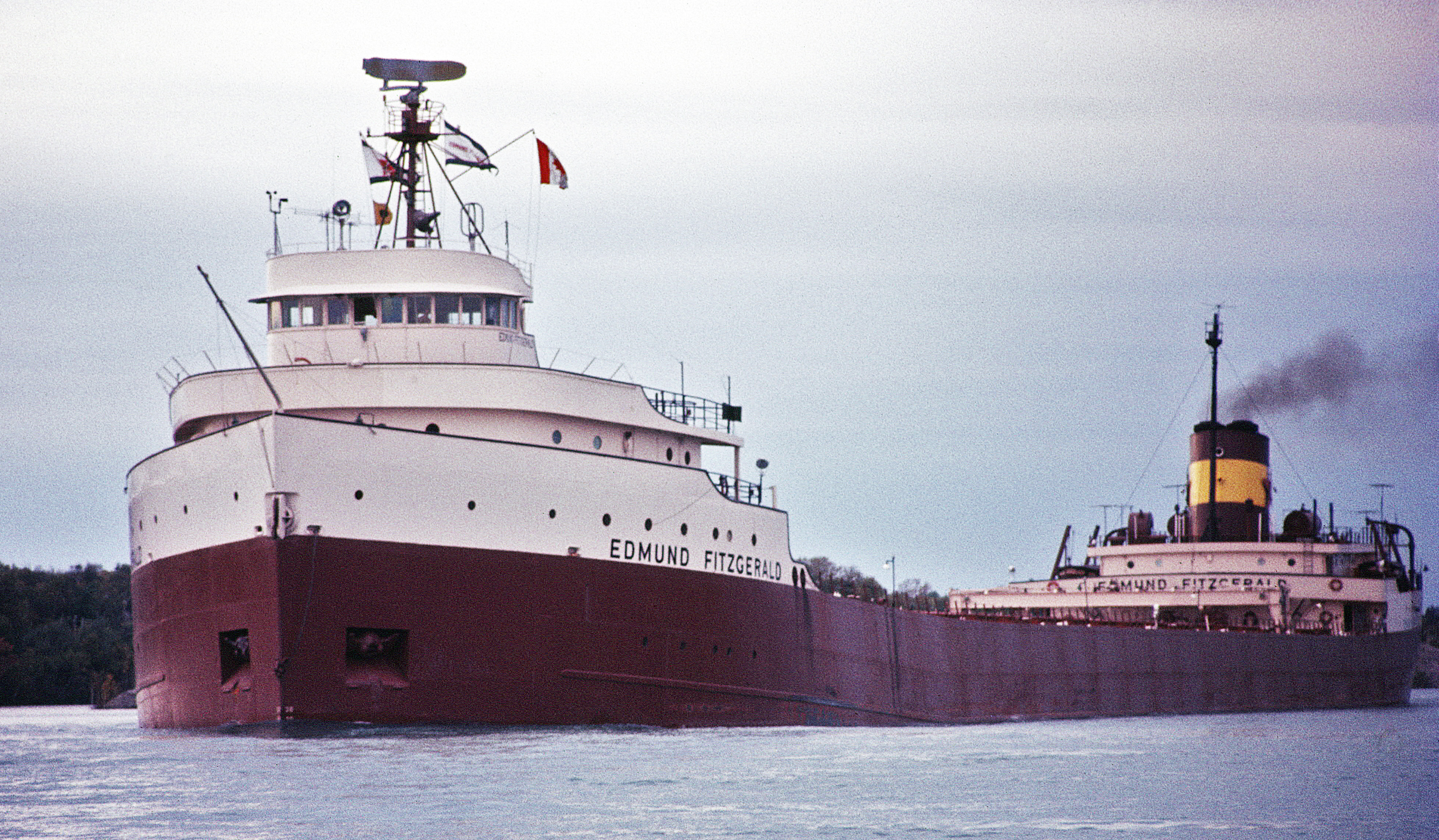
The SS Edmund Fitzgerald is possibly the most famous shipwreck in the Great Lakes.

The most well-known lake freighter was Edmund Fitzgerald, which sank during a storm on Lake Superior on November 10, 1975. Gordon Lightfoot's ballad, "The Wreck of the Edmund Fitzgerald", publicized the incident. The Edmund Fitzgerald became the largest ship on the lakes at 729 feet (222 m) when launched in 1958. In addition to this, the ship was regarded for its "DJ Captain", Peter Pulcer, who frequently played music to entertain onlookers.

SS Arthur M. Anderson, launched in 1952, is known for having last contact with Edmund Fitzgerald and was the first vessel on-scene to search for the Edmund Fitzgerald.

MV Paul R. Tregurtha currently holds the title "Queen of the Lakes" as the largest ship on the lakes since 1981. The modern stern-ender was first launched MV William J. Delancy and measures 1013.5 feet (308.9 m).

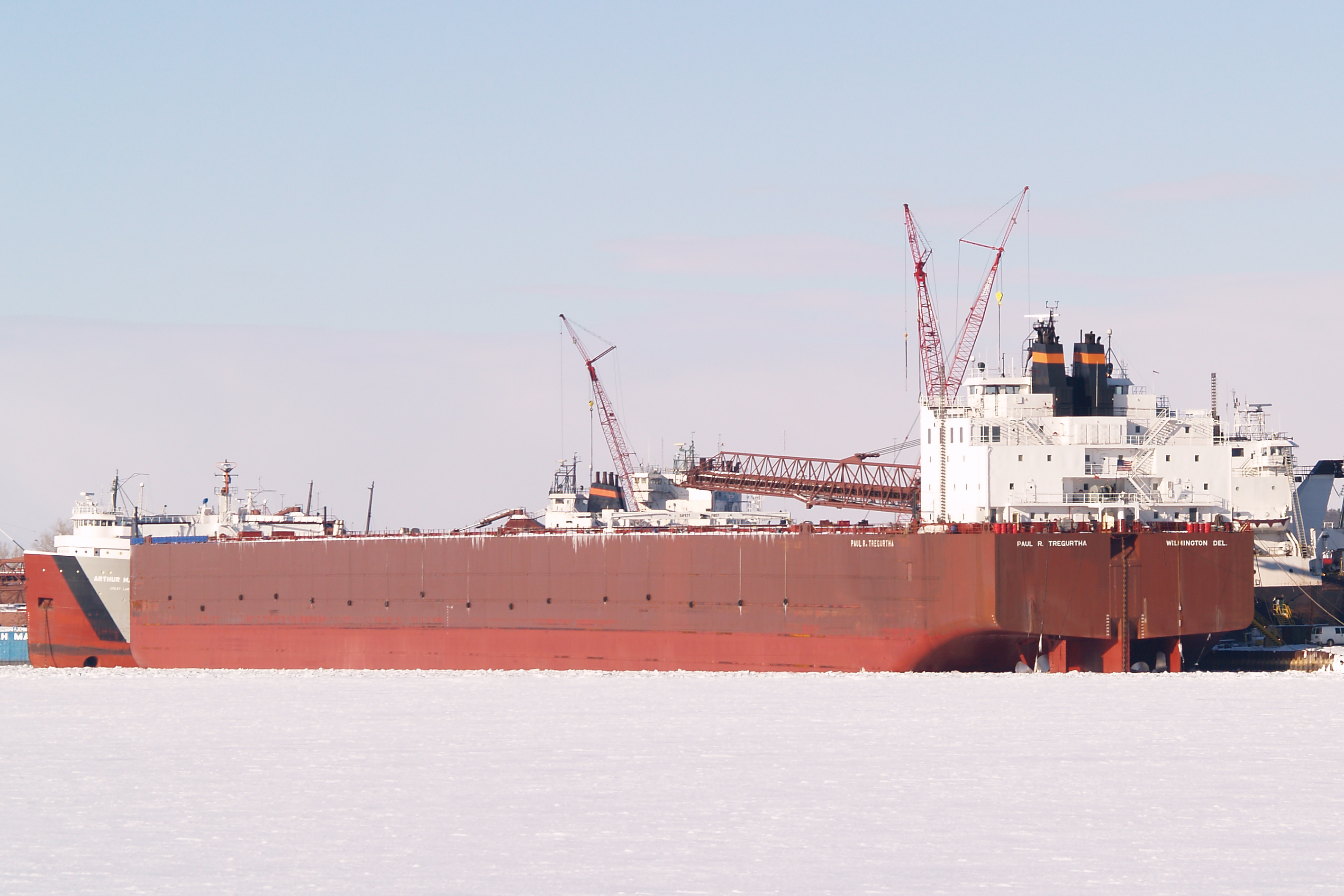
Paul R. Tregurtha on winter lay-up in Sturgeon Bay, Wisconsin, on February 19, 2008.

Onoko was the second iron-hulled laker, launched in 1882. At 302 ft, Onoko was the longest ship on the lakes and became the first bulk carrier to hold the unofficial title of "Queen of the Lakes". The title that has been passed down to record-breaking lake freighters since. SS Carl D. Bradley held the title for 22 years, longer than any other laker of the classic design.

Also of note is the steamer Edward L. Ryerson, widely known for her artistic design and being the only remaining straight-decker still hauling ore on the US side of the Great Lakes. In mid-2006, Edward L. Ryerson was fitted out and put into service following a long-term lay-up that began in 1998. Edward L. Ryerson has been in long-term layup since 2009.

== Museum ships and surviving hulls ==
=== Museum ships ===
List of museum ships
Ship	Location	Notes	Ref.
Col. James M. Schoonmaker	National Museum of the Great Lakes, Toledo, Ohio	The largest bulk freighter in the world when launched in 1911. The Col. James M. Schoonmaker formerly served as a floating museum after being purchased by the City of Toledo, Ohio in 1987.	
Meteor	Barker's Island, Superior, Wisconsin	The last surviving whaleback ship is now a museum less from a mile from where it was launched. The ship is permanently land-berthed on Barker's Island.	
Valley Camp	Sault Ste. Marie, Michigan	Launched as Louis W. Hill in 1917 and transported cargo until retiring in 1966. On July 6, 1968, the ship arrived in Sault Ste. Marie Michigan during the town's tricentennial celebration for use as a museum ship. The museum ship displays many relics of the sinking of Edmund Fitzgerald including two of Edmund Fitzgerald's mauled lifeboats.	
William A. Irvin	Canal Park, Duluth, Minnesota	The flagship of U.S. Steel's Great Lakes fleet from 1938 to 1975. The William A. Irvin was retired in 1978 and purchased eight years later by the Duluth Entertainment Convention Center and is available for touring.	
William G. Mather	North Coast Harbor, Cleveland, Ohio	The ship launched in 1925 and served as the Cleveland-Cliffs Iron Company's flagship until 1980. In 1987, it was donated to the Great Lakes Historical Society for restoration and preservation. The ship was acquired by the Great Lakes Science Center for use as a museum ship in 2006.	

=== Surviving hulls and partial ships ===
List of surviving hulls and partial ships
Ship	Location	Notes	Ref.
Benson Ford	South Bass Island, near Put-in-Bay, Ohio	The flagship of the Ford Motor Company fleet when launched in 1924. The forward cabin and pilothouse was moved in 1986 to a cliff on South Bass Island in Lake Erie. It has been a private island residence since 1999 and they offer tours on select dates.	
Calcite	40 Mile Lighthouse Park, Rogers City, Michigan	The 40 Mile Point Lighthouse Society relocated the pilothouse of the steamer Calcite to the park in Rogers City, Michigan.	
John Sherwin	DeTour Village, Michigan	SS John Sherwin has not sailed since 1981 and is currently docked at the Interlake Steamship Dock after conversion to a self-unloader and repowering was halted in November 2008.	
Lewis G. Harriman	DeTour Village, Michigan	The ship was christened as the SS John W. Boardman in 1923 and was later renamed in 1965. The ship was sold for scrap in 2003, however the bow and superstructure were preserved. In 2005, the ship arrived in DeTour and was renovated into a residence.	
Ridgetown	Mississauga, Ontario, Canada	SS Ridgetown was partially sunk as a breakwater (with stack and cabins intact) near Toronto at Port Credit. It was built in 1905 and is one of the oldest surviving hulls on the lake. Its silhouette provides an example of the appearance of early 1900s lake freighters.	
St. Mary's Challenger	National Museum of the Great Lakes, Toledo, Ohio	The 120-year-old ship's pilothouse is display inside the National Museum of the Great Lakes. The pilothouse is open for tours and overlooks the Detroit River.	
William Clay Ford	Dossin Great Lakes Museum, Detroit, Michigan	The ship's pilothouse is now part of the Dossin Great Lakes Museum on Belle Isle in Detroit.	

=== Failed museum attempts, ships scrapped ===
Several other lakers nearly became museums, but were scrapped for lack of funding, political opposition, and other causes.

List of scrapped ships and failed museum attempts
Ship	Location scrapped	Notes	Ref.
Niagara	Erie, Pennsylvania	1897-built freighter, later converted to a sand-sucker. Scrapped in 1997 by Liberty Iron & Metal after a failed attempt to convert the ship into a museum in Erie. She had been saved from the scrapyard 11 years earlier.	
J. B. Ford	Duluth, Minnesota	1904 freighter that survived the 1905 Mataafa storm and the Great Lakes Storm of 1913 with the last three-cycle reciprocating steam engine was too expensive to turn into a museum and was sent to Azcon Metals in Duluth to be scrapped in 2015.	
John Ericsson	Hamilton, Ontario	The second-to-last whaleback freighter. John Ericsson was scrapped in 1969. Politics, as was the case with Canadiana, played a central role in the loss of the ship.	
Seaway Queen	Alang, Gujarat, India	The Canadian straightdecker Seaway Queen, formerly owned by Upper Lakes Shipping, and the setting for the movie version of David Mamet's play Lakeboat, was involved in an attempt to save the ship as a museum. In the end, the company failed to locate an organization that was capable and willing to preserve the ship and she was sold and scrapped in Alang, India, in 2004.	

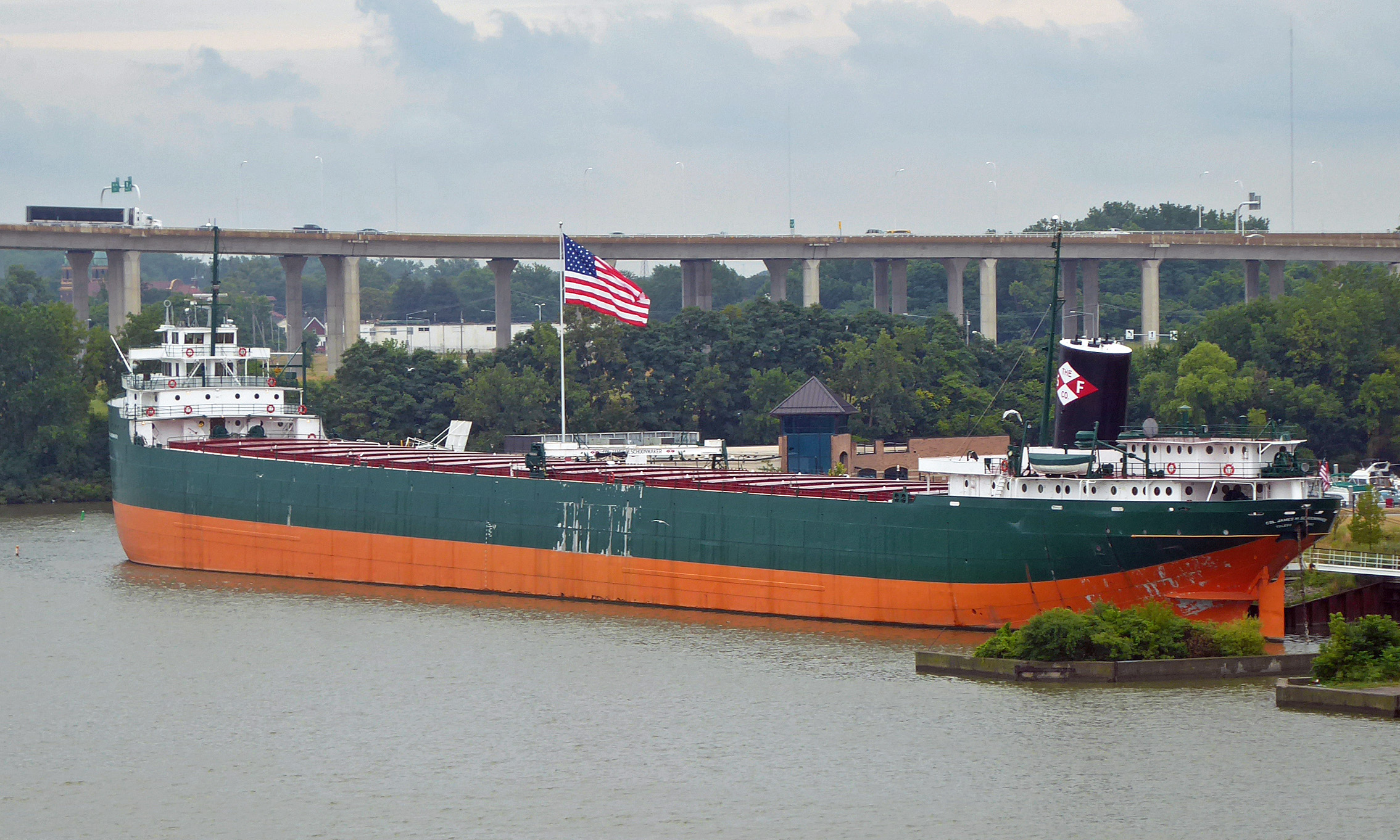
SS Col. James M. Schoonmaker docked in Toledo, Ohio in 2018.

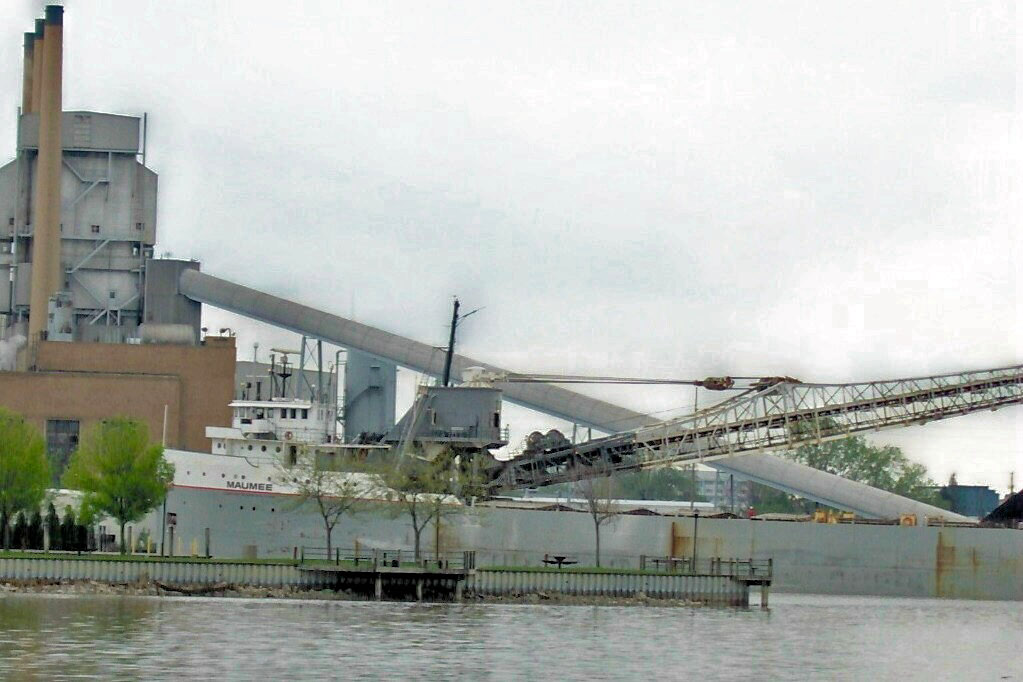
MV Maumee unloads in Holland, Michigan. Scrapped in 2012 when she was 83 years old.

== See also ==
- Glossary of nautical terms
- Great Lakes Maritime Academy
- Great Lakes Storm of 1913
- Great Lakes Waterway
- Maritime transport
- Merchant ship
