= Bay Shipbuilding Company =

American shipyard and dry dock company

Coordinates: 44.841°N 87.382°W

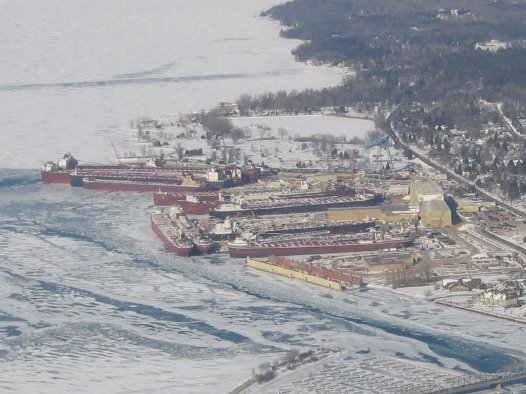
- Lakers wintering over at Bay Shipbuilding, 2006
- Industry: Shipbuilding
- Predecessor: Sturgeon Bay Shipbuilding and Christy Corporation
- Founded: 1968 (as Bay Shipbuilding)
- Headquarters: Sturgeon Bay, Door County, Wisconsin
- Parent: Fincantieri Marine Group (2009-); Manitowoc Company (1968–2008)
- Website: https://fincantierimarinegroup.com/about-us/us-shipyards/bay-shipbuilding/

Bay Shipbuilding Company (BSC) is a shipyard and dry dock company in Sturgeon Bay, Door County, Wisconsin. As of 2015, Bay Ships was a subsidiary of Fincantieri Marine Group and produces articulated tug and barges, OPA-90 compliant double hull tank ships and offshore support vessels. It also provides repair services to the lake freighter fleet. In the past the shipyard located in Sturgeon Bay has operated under several different names and traces its history back to 1918.

The company also built 40,000 ton Lake freighters in the 1970s and 1980s. While capable of producing large freighters, the yard had not built a freighter over 20,000 tons since 1987 until the MV Mark W. Barker, launched in 2022. Former names of the shipyards at the 2015 location of Bay Shipbuilding are: Sturgeon Bay Shipbuilding, Leathem D. Smith Shipbuilding Company and Christy Corporation.

== History as Bay Shipbuilding ==
=== 1968 to 1979 ===
Bay Shipbuilding Company was formed in 1968 after The Manitowoc Company closed Manitowoc Shipbuilding Company and purchased Sturgeon Bay Shipbuilding and then Christy Corporation in 1970, which were adjacent on the east side of the Sturgeon Bay Ship Canal. Sturgeon Bay Shipbuilding & Dry Dock was formerly Rieboldt, Wolter & Co., Universal Shipbuilding Company and Sturgeon Bay Dry Dock Company. Christy Corporation was formerly Leathem D. Smith Towing & Wrecking Company, Leathem D. Smith Dock Company and Leathem D. Smith Shipbuilding & Dry Dock Company.

Bay Shipbuilding initially invested $500,000 in purchasing the two yards. In the early 1970s they invested $30 million for improvements. The 1970s turned out to be a boom period for Bay Shipbuilding since Great Lakes shipping fleet owners had decided to upgrade their fleets. They would build 30 ships for the lake fleet in the 1970s.

In 1975, Bay Shipbuilding had around 800 workers and expected to expand to 1,400 because of a new contract to construct four 1,000 foot long lake freighters for the American Steamship Company and Bethlehem Steel. At least six of the 1,000 foot long, 40,000 ton self-unloading ore carriers were delivered from 1977 to May 1981. By the end of 1978, Bay Shipbuilding employed nearly 2,000.

=== 1980s and 1990s ===
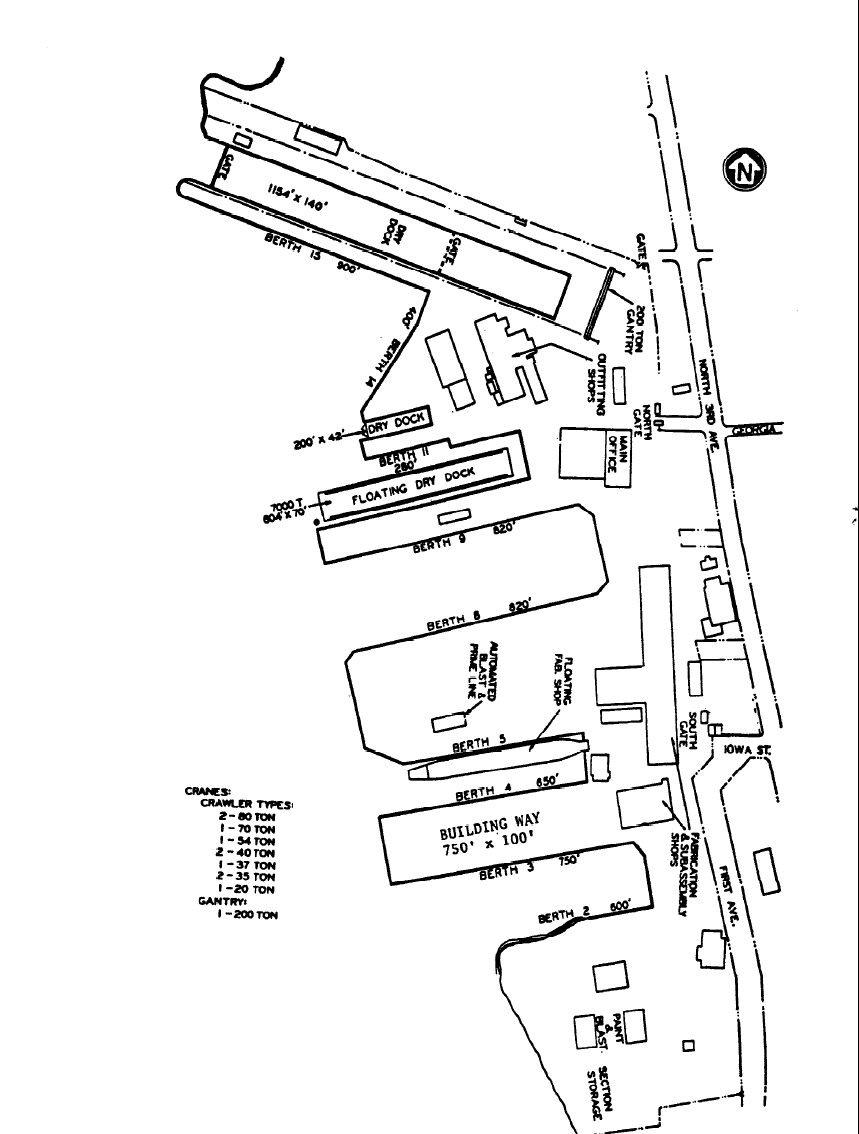
A drawing of Bay Shipbuilding, c.1985.

After the construction projects for new lake freighters had dried up, Bay Shipbuilding entered the salt-water shipbuilding market. By 1984, employment had fallen to around 220. Bay shipbuilding received a contract with Sea-Land Service for three container ships for around $180 million later that year. The ships were Sea-Land's only vessels designed and built in the United States. However, Bay Shipbuilding did not win the contracts by underbidding foreign shipyards. Since the ships were destined for the Puget Sound to Alaska trade route, the Jones Act required that the ships be made in the United States. In March 1988, after the completion of the three Sea-Land container ships, Bay Shipbuilding announced it was ceasing new shipbuilding due to the lack of domestic contracts and a decline in the US shipbuilding industry. In the mid-1990s, the nearby Peterson Builders shipyard closed.

In the late 1990s, the yard built a handful of smaller vessels including a ferry, two tugs, a dredge and the 475 foot tank barge Seneca (later named DBL 140).

=== 2000s – present ===
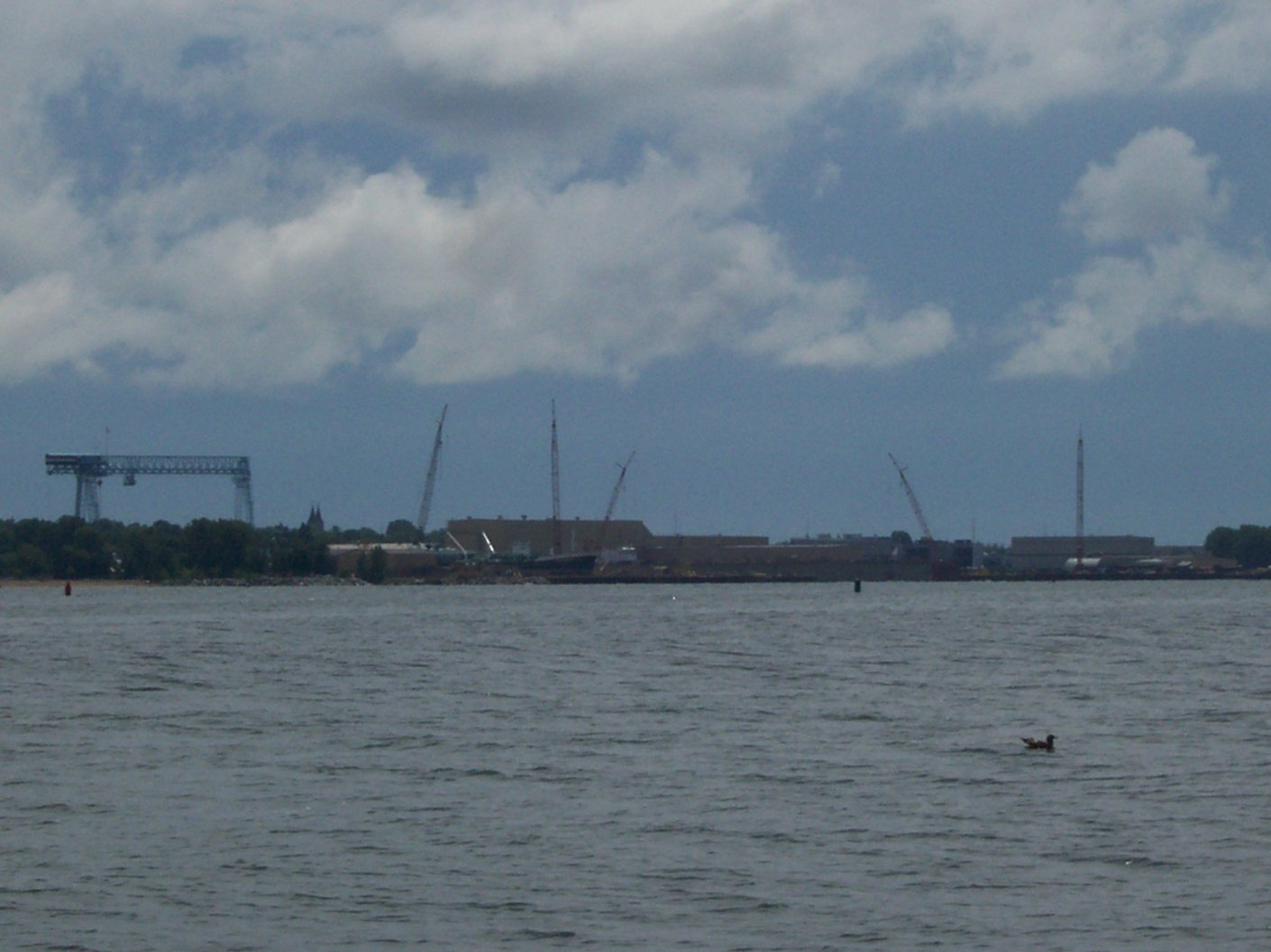
A view of Bay Shipbuilding from Potawatomi State Park, July 2008.

In the 2000s, Bay Shipbuilding continued to construct Oil Pollution Act of 1990 compliant double hulled tank barges and more recently Articulated tug and barges and Offshore Support Vessels.

The Manitowoc Company sold its marine business, which included Bay Shipbuilding, to Fincantieri Marine Group, effective at the end of the day on December 31, 2008. Prior to 2015, Fincantieri added a new floating dry dock and Computer-aided manufacturing equipment during a $26 million capital expansion plan. In 2021 the shipyard launched the 639ft freighter MV Mark W. Barker, becoming the first U.S. shipyard to launch a new laker in 40 years. Several other ship sized barges up to 740ft in length have been constructed during the 21st Century.

In February 2021, the iconic lake ship MV Roger Blough caught fire while in winter layup at Bay Ship Building, causing damages estimated between $22-100 million to the vessel. No injuries were reported in the incident.

On July 1, 2022, the MV Mark W. Barker was floated out of the graving dock, becoming the first lake freighter built by the yard since 1987. The river-class freighter entered regular service on July 27 and was formally christened on September 1 in Cleveland, Ohio.

== Predecessor companies ==
=== Sturgeon Bay Shipbuilding and Dry Dock Company and predecessors ===
Universal Shipbuilding Company and the Sturgeon Bay Dry Dock Company merged in 1926 and formed the Sturgeon Bay Shipbuilding and Dry Dock Company. Sturgeon Bay SB&DDC changed ownership in April 1934 and employed around 90 workers at the time. They built fishing vessels, tow boats and ferries prior to World War II. During the war Sturgeon Bay SB&DDC built some Design 210, 150 foot Steel Diesel Retrieving Vessels for the U.S. Army (H-2 to H-12). They also built Design 216, 100 foot Steel Diesel Supply Boats (F 5 to F 14 and F 125 to F 130) for the Army. Additionally, they built a fairly large number of 45 foot tugs and a few 86 foot tugs as well.

After the war, Sturgeon Bay SB&DDC built ferries, tugboats, towboats, a yacht or two and fishing vessels. Most of the vessels were under 100 feet long. By 1949 employment at Sturgeon Bay SB&DDC was around 225. 20 tugs were built for Mississippi River barge pushing in the 1950s. In the 1960s, Sturgeon Bay SB&DDC built a number of fishing trawlers that were around 100 feet long for the New England fishing industry.

As mentioned above, in 1968 Sturgeon Bay SB&DDC was purchased by the Manitowoc Company and renamed Bay Shipbuilding.

=== Christy Corporation and predecessors ===
Christy Corporation was formed just after World War II from Leathem D. Smith Shipbuilding which had been previously named, Leathem D. Smith Towing & Wrecking Company, Leathem D. Smith Dock Company and Leathem D. Smith Shipbuilding & Dry Dock Company.

During World War II, Leathem D. Smith Shipbuilding built some Type N3 ships and a number of 175 foot PC-461-class submarine chasers, like USS Munising (PC-1228). They also built several Tacoma-class frigates, like USS Peoria (PF-67). Toward the end of the war, Leathem built net laying ships, water tankers and several 389 foot Type C1 ships as well. During the war, Leathem averaged a ship delivered every 20 days. The yard peaked at about 5,000 workers during the war.

As Christy Corporation, in the 1950s the yard built SS Spartan and SS Badger, Wisconsin to Michigan ferries. They also built Terrebonne Parish-class tank landing ships, like USS Washtenaw County (LST-1166) and Landing Craft Utility ships (LCU-1610 type) for the US Navy.

In the 1960s, Christy built a variety of different ship types, such as USNS James M. Gilliss (T-AGOR-4), USNS Charles H. Davis (T-AGOR-5), MV Tustumena, NOAAS David Starr Jordan (R 444), USCGC Active (WMEC-618) and USNS Kane (T-AGS-27).

As mentioned above, in 1970 Christy Corporation's yard was purchased by the Manitowoc Company and merged into Bay Shipbuilding.

== See also ==
- Marinette Marine, another subsidiary of Fincantieri Marine Group.
- Manitowoc Shipbuilding Company, closed by The Manitowoc Company to form Bay Shipbuilding.
- Fraser Shipyards, another large Great Lakes shipyard.
