= MV Algonorth =

British Ship

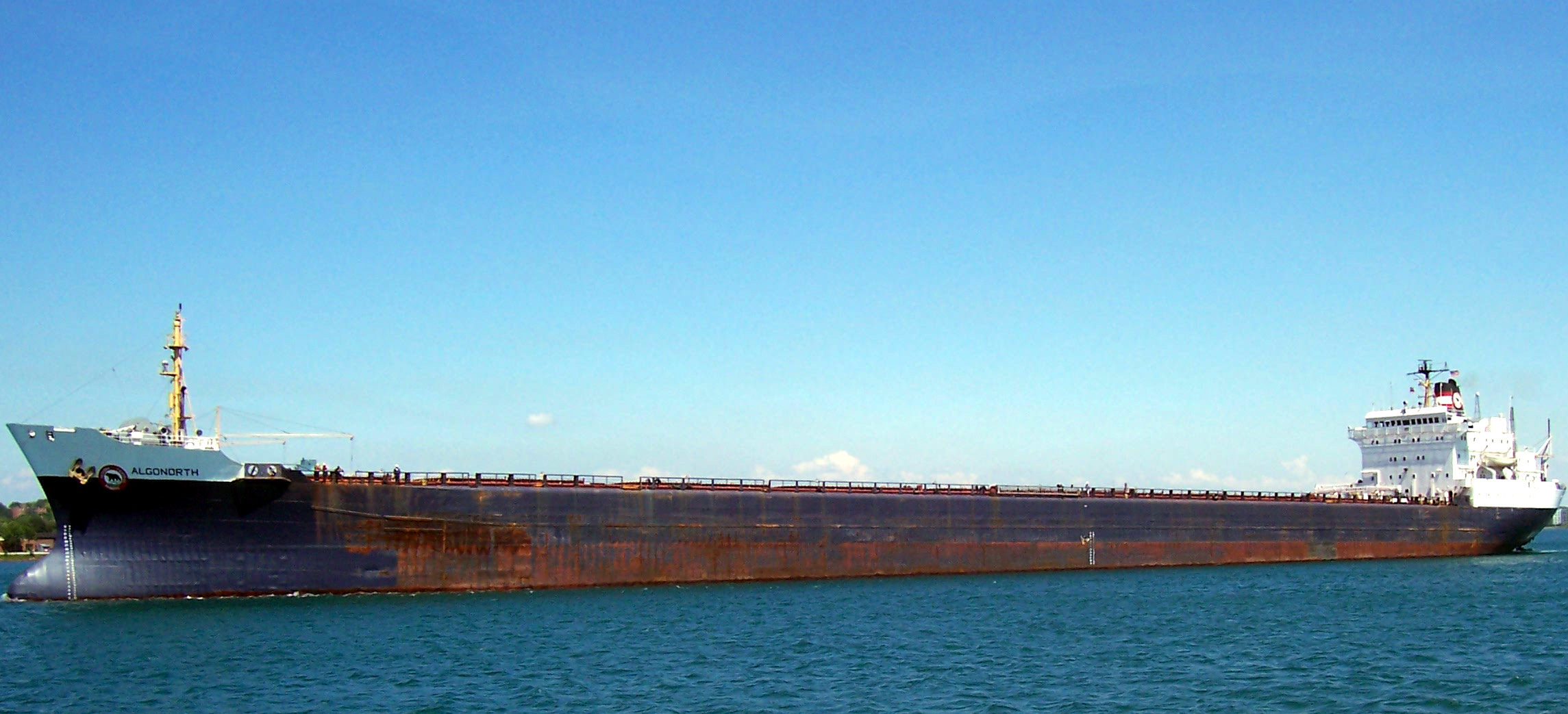
- Algonorth with extended hull at Sault Ste Marie on 20 July 2006

History
- Name: Temple Bar (1971–1976); Lake Nipigon (1976–1984); Laketon (1984–1986); Lake Nipigon (1986–1987); Algonorth (1987–2012)
- Owner: Lambert Bros. Shipping Ltd. (1971–1976); Nipigon Transport Ltd. (1976–1987); Algoma Central Railway (1987–1990); Algoma Central (1990–2012)
- Port of registry: (United Kingdom) London (1971–1976); Canada (1976–1987); (Canada) Sault Ste. Marie, Ontario (1987–2012)
- Builder: Govan Division of Upper Clyde Shipbuilders Ltd., Govan, Scotland
- Yard number: 101
- Laid down: 22 December 1969
- Launched: 1 September 1970
- Completed: 8 April 1971
- In service: 1971
- Out of service: 2012
- Identification: IMO number: 7028104
- Fate: Scrapped 2012

General characteristics as built
- Type: Bulk carrier
- Tonnage: 13,545 GRT; 22,512 DWT
- Length: 160.9 m (527 ft 11 in) oa; 150.9 m (495 ft 1 in) pp
- Beam: 22.9 m (75 ft 2 in)
- Draught: 13.1 m (43 ft 0 in)
- Installed power: 2 Ruston V-12-cylinder diesel engines, 4,500 kW (6,000 bhp)
- Propulsion: 1 propeller
- Speed: 15 knots (28 km/h; 17 mph)

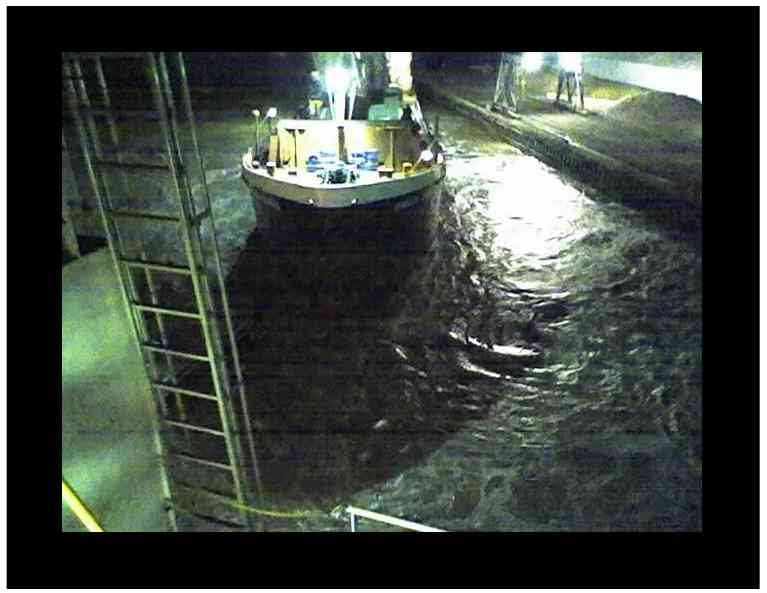
On 15 December 2007 Algonorth ran into the Midwest Marine Terminal dock in Toledo, Ohio, spilling over 3,500 tons of diesel fuel

MV Algonorth was a Seawaymax lake freighter built in 1970 and completed in 1971 by the Govan Division of Upper Clyde Shipbuilders Ltd. in Govan, Scotland as the bulk carrier Temple Bar. Her original owners were Lambert Bros. Shipping Ltd., of London, United Kingdom, sold the vessel in 1976 to Nipigon Transport Ltd., who had her hull lengthened and installed a new power plant for Great Lakes service. Re-entering service as Lake Nipigon, the ship was renamed Laketon in 1984 before returning to the name Lake Nipigon in 1986. In 1987, the lake freighter was sold to Algoma Central Railway which gave the ship its final named, Algonorth. In 2007, the ship collided with a dock in Toledo, Ohio. The ship was scrapped in 2012.

== Description ==
As built, the vessel was constructed as a bulk carrier, measuring 160.9 metres (527 ft 11 in) long overall and 150.9 m (495 ft 1 in) between perpendiculars with a beam of 22.9 m (75 ft 2 in) and a depth of 13.1 m (43 ft 0 in). The ship was assessed at 13,545 gross register tons (GRT) and 22,512 tons deadweight (DWT). Temple Bar was initially powered by two Ruston V-12-cylinder diesel engines turning one propeller creating 4,500 kilowatts (6,000 bhp) and giving the ship a maximum speed of 15 knots (28 km/h; 17 mph). In 1974, the bulk carrier was re-engined with two Werkspoor 9TM410 9-cylinder engines creating 4,500 kW (6,000 bhp). The ship's speed increased to 16 knots (30 km/h; 18 mph).

After the ship was lengthened for Great Lakes service as a Seawaymax lake freighter in 1976, the vessel measured 222.5 m (730 ft 0 in) long overall with a beam of 22.9 m (75 ft 2 in) and a depth of 13.1 m (43 ft 0 in) and a midsummer draught of 8.7 m (28 ft 7 in). The ship was reassessed at 18,495 gross tonnage (GT) and 28,481 tons deadweight (DWT).

== Service history ==
The ship was constructed by the Govan Division of Upper Clyde Shipbuilders Ltd. at their yard in Govan, Scotland, for Lambert Bros. Shipping Ltd., of London, United Kingdom. The vessel was laid down on 22 December 1969 with the yard number 101 and was launched on 1 September 1970. Named Temple Bar, the bulk carrier was completed on 8 April 1971 and registered in London. In 1974, Temple Bar underwent a refit at Rotterdam, Netherlands where the new engines were installed. In 1976, the ship sailed to Singapore to undergo refit and lengthening for service on the Great Lakes after being purchased by Nipigon Transport Ltd. The ship returned to service with a Canadian registry and renamed Lake Nipigon in May 1977.

While in service on the Great Lakes, the lake freighter serviced ports along the St. Lawrence Seaway and in the Great Lakes on both the Canadian and American sides of the border. The vessel transported a multitude of cargoes including grains such as barley, corn, wheat, oats and rye along with coal. On 24 May 1983, Lake Nipigon went aground off Port Colborne, Ontario, due to a power failure. After being freed, the ship sailed to Montreal, Quebec, for repairs. In 1984, the lake freighter was chartered to Misener Transportation and renamed Laketon in their service. When the charter ended, the ship's name reverted to Lake Nipigon.

In April 1986, Lake Nipigon was acquired by Algoma Central Railway, renamed Algonorth and registered in Sault Ste. Marie. On 14 November 1992, while departing Toledo, Ohio, Algonorth lost control while being assisted by tugboats and its bow collided with drawbridge supports while the stern struck the cargo ship Murray Bay which was loading at the dock. Neither vessel suffered serious damage in the incident and Algonorth was freed the following day. On 2 August 1994, Algonorth struck the cargo ship Rixta Oldendorff near the Beauharnois Canal in the St. Lawrence Seaway, with both vessels suffering minor damage. The following year on 30 July, Algonorth struck the barge Medusa Conquest. Neither vessel suffered serious damage.

On 20 December 1999, the ship ran aground in the harbour at Sarnia, Ontario, after loading a cargo of grain. Algonorth was freed with no damage. The ship suffered a small fire on 21 February 2005 while in winter layup at Toronto, Ontario, resulting in no damage to ship and small loss of cargo. Algonorth suffered a second fire that year on 16 August while transiting from Hamilton, Ontario, to Thunder Bay, Ontario that caused the ship to lose power. The fire was extinguished and the lake freighter completed the journey with the assistance of tugboats, undergoing repairs upon arrival.

Algonorth crashed into a dock at Toledo on 15 December 2007, spilling over 3,500 barrels (560 m^{3}) of diesel fuel. The spill covered over 2.6 square kilometres (1 mi^{2}). The Maumee River was closed to traffic. Algonorth was scrapped beginning on 18 July 2012.
