= Algoma Sault =

History
- Name: Algoma Sault
- Owner: Algoma Central
- Operator: Algoma Central
- Port of registry: Canada St. Catharines
- Builder: Jiangsu Newyangzi SB, Jingjiang, China
- Yard number: 2015-1243
- Completed: January 2018
- In service: 2018
- Identification: IMO number: 9619282; Call sign: VBCD; MMSI number: 316036089
- Status: In service

General characteristics
- Class & type: Equinox-class freighter
- Tonnage: 24,640 GT; 37,411 DWT
- Length: 225.55 m (740 ft 0 in) oa; 222.47 m (729 ft 11 in) pp
- Beam: 23.77 m (78 ft 0 in)

Algoma Sault, which entered service in 2018, is the third freighter Algoma Central named after Sault Ste. Marie, Ontario. She is a self-unloading bulk carrier, built for carrying cargoes like ore, grain, or coal, on the North American Great Lakes and St. Lawrence Seaway. She is the seventh vessel of the Equinox class, and like her sister ships she was built in China.

== Design and description ==
The Equinox class were designed for Algoma Central in an effort to modernise their fleet of ships operating on the Great Lakes and St. Lawrence Seaway. The main element of the design was to improve fuel efficiency and to reduce its environmental impact. Algoma Sault is a self-unloading bulk carrier that measures 225.55 metres (740 ft 0 in) long overall and 222.47 m (729 ft 11 in) between perpendiculars with a beam of 23.77 m (78 ft 0 in). Algoma Sault has a depth of hull of 14.7 m (48 ft 3 in) and a midsummer draught of 9.5 metres (31 ft 2 in). The ship is powered by a Tier II compliant diesel engine with a fully integrated IMO-approved exhaust gas scrubber that removes over 98% of all sulphur oxides from shipboard emissions, creating 8,310 kilowatts (11,144 bhp). The engine turns a single six-metre (20 ft) propeller.

The ship is measured at 24,640 gross tonnage (GT) and 37,411 tons deadweight (DWT). Algoma Sault has a 79.25 m (260.0 ft) self-discharging boom.

== Construction and career ==
The vessel was constructed by Jiangsu Newyangzi SB, at their yard in Jingjiang, China in 2017 and given the yard number 2015-1243. The ship was completed in January 2018 and registered in Funafuti, Tuvalu. The ship departed China on 3 February 2018 and crossed the Pacific Ocean, arriving in Canada in late March where the ship was re-flagged to Canada. Like Algosoo before her, Algoma Sault is named for Sault Ste. Marie, Ontario, as a tribute to the relationship between Algoma Central and city. She is the third vessel of Algoma Central's fleet to be named after the city. Algoma Sault is the second self-unloading Equinox-class bulk carrier and the seventh ship of the class overall. The ship entered service in 2018 and sails on the Great Lakes and St. Lawrence Seaway delivering dry bulk cargoes such as wheat, and road salt.
