= Roy A. Jodrey =

Canadian bulk carrier sunk in the St Lawrence river

Coordinates: 44°20′N 75°56′W

History
- Name: Roy A. Jodrey
- Owner: Algoma Steel Ore Company
- Port of registry: (Canada) Collingwood
- Builder: Collingwood Shipyards Ltd., Collingwood
- Laid down: 11 February 1965
- Launched: 9 September 1965
- Completed: November 1965
- Identification: IMO number: 6522622
- Fate: Sank, 21 November 1974

General characteristics
- Type: Bulk carrier
- Tonnage: 16,154 GRT; 22,750 DWT
- Length: 195.1 m (640 ft 1 in) oa
- Beam: 21.8 m (71 ft 6 in)
- Depth: 11.7 m (38 ft 4 in)
- Propulsion: Diesel engine, 1 shaft
- Speed: 15 knots (28 km/h; 17 mph)
- Crew: 29

Roy A. Jodrey was a bulk carrier owned by Algoma Central Railway. Named in honour of Roy A. Jodrey who was a director and shareholder of the company, the ship was launched and entered service in 1965, one of four ships constructed for the company to access ports on the Great Lakes and Saint Lawrence Seaway too small for use by the larger lake freighters. On 20 November 1974, Roy A. Jodrey struck Pullman Shoal in the St. Lawrence River in Alexandria Bay, New York. The vessel made it to the United States Coast Guard Station at Wellesley Island and tied up. At 03:00, the bulk carrier sank in 77 metres (254 ft) of water, with its entire crew reaching safety. No attempt to salvage the ship was made, but Algoma did try to salvage the vessel's cargo of iron ore, which led to the death of a diver. Roy A. Jodrey became a technical scuba diving site, whose difficulty has led to the deaths of several divers who have attempted it.

== Description ==
Roy A. Jodrey was a bulk carrier 195.1 m (640 ft 1 in) long overall with a beam of 21.8 m (71 ft 6 in). The ship had a gross register tonnage (GRT) of 16,154 and a deadweight tonnage (DWT) of 22,750. Roy A. Jodrey had a hull depth of 11.7 m (38 ft 4 in). The ship was designed to access ports on the Great Lakes and Saint Lawrence Seaway that the larger lake freighters could not. Roy A. Jodrey was powered by a diesel engine driving one shaft that gave the vessel a maximum speed of 15 knots (28 km/h; 17 mph). The ship had a crew of 29.

== Construction and career ==
The bulk carrier was ordered from Collingwood Shipyards Ltd. by Algoma Central Railway. The vessel was built at their yard in Collingwood, Ontario with the yard number 186. The ship was launched on 9 September 1965 and completed in November. Roy A. Jodrey was the first of four ships built to this design. (Note: The other ships being Algorail, Agawa Canyon and Algoway.) The ship was registered in Collingwood and flagged for Canada. The main cargoes of Roy A. Jodrey were ore, coal and limestone, but was also used to transport road salt, bentonite, potash, bauxite and coke.

=== Sinking ===
On 20 November 1974, Roy A. Jodrey was transporting iron ore pellets from Sept-Îles, Quebec to Detroit, Michigan when the ship struck buoy no. 194 off Wellesley Island near Alexandria Bay, New York in the Saint Lawrence River. The buoy tore a hole in the ship's hull, which the crew attempted to patch. Roy A. Jodrey continued on to the United States Coast Guard Station at Wellesley Island, where the vessel ran up on Pullman Shoal. The ballast pumps were unable to keep the ship afloat and the ship slid off the shoal, rolled over on its side and sank on 21 November 1974 with no loss of life.

The ship was declared unsalvageable and Roy A. Jodrey's registry was closed on 7 October 1975. The wreck lies in 77 metres (254 ft) of water at its deepest. The bow comes up to 44 m (145 ft). When the ship sank, it had aboard 50,000 US gallons (190,000 L) of fuel. Officials were initially concerned the fuel tanks would rupture and oil was spotted seeping from one of the ventilators. At the time, this was considered acceptable. Algoma Central Railway replaced Roy A. Jodrey with Algosea, a German-flagged bulk carrier.

In 2002, a cleanup project headed by the New York State Department of Environment Conservation removed some of the remaining oil. The wreck is a popular destination for technical scuba divers. It is considered a difficult wreck, with some divers losing their lives while diving the wreck.

== Sources ==
- Bascom, John A., ed. (December 1974). "Marine News". The Scanner. 7 (3). Halton Hills, Ontario: Toronto Marine Historical Society.
- Gillham, Skip (1982). Ten Tales of the Great Lakes. St. Catharines, Ontario: Stonehouse Publications. ISBN 0-919549-10-1.
