= MV Algoma Mariner =

Great Lakes self-unloading bulk carrier

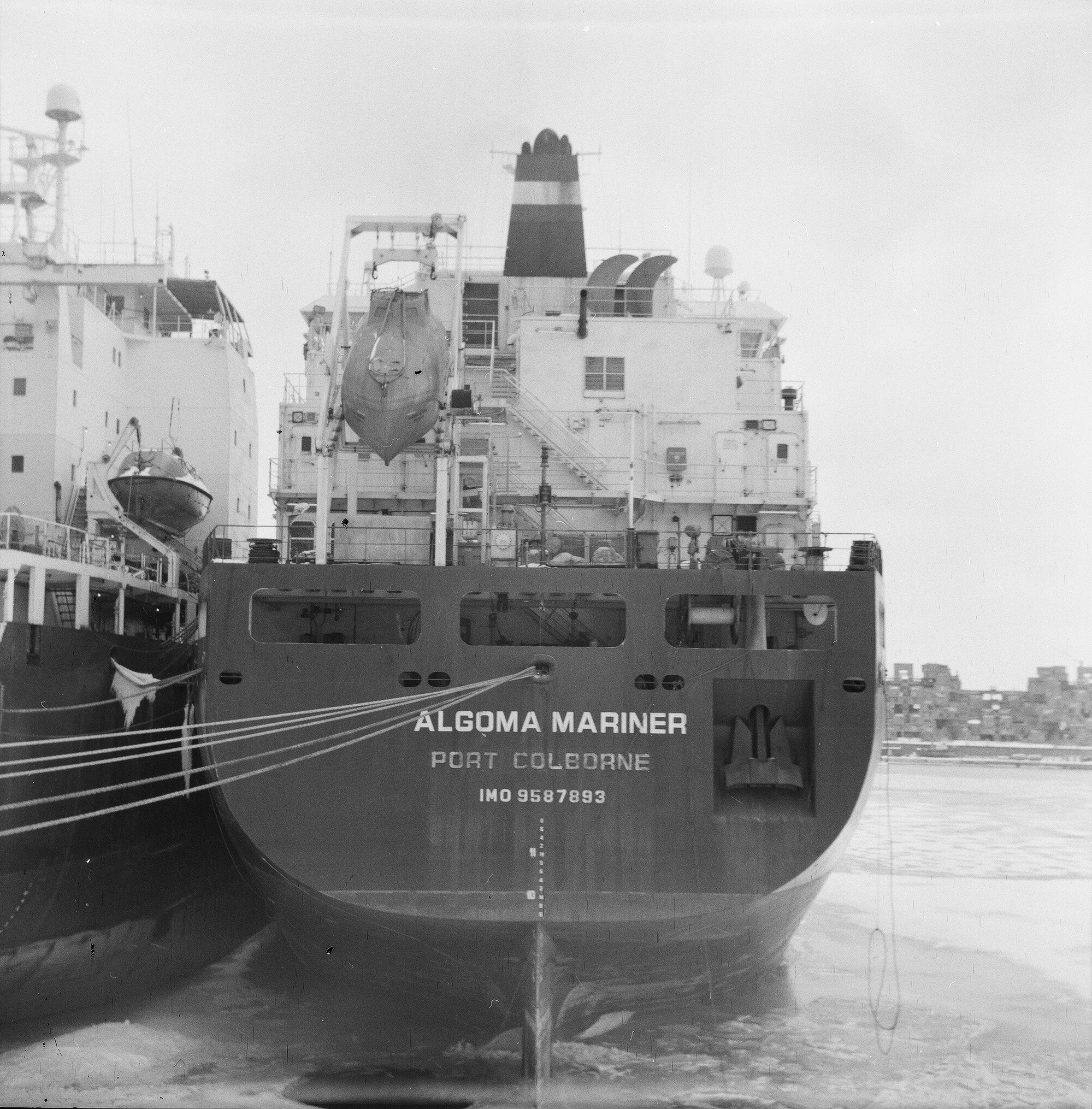
- Algoma Mariner on 24 March 2015

History
- Name: Algoma Mariner
- Owner: Algoma Central
- Port of registry: (Canada) Port Colborne, Ontario
- Builder: Chengxi Shipyard, Jiangyin, China
- Cost: CAD$50 million
- Yard number: 324
- Christened: 25 August 2011
- Completed: 31 May 2011
- Identification: IMO number: 9587893; Call sign: CFN5517; MMSI number: 316014050
- Status: In active service

General characteristics
- Type: Self-unloading dry-bulk carrier
- Tonnage: 24,535 GT; 9,504 NT; 38,000 DWT
- Length: 225.56 m (740 ft 0 in) o/a; 219.51 m (720 ft 2 in) p/p
- Beam: 23.74 m (77 ft 11 in)
- Depth: 15 m (49 ft 3 in)
- Propulsion: 1 × 9,600 hp (7,159 kW) 6-cylinder MAN 2-stroke low-speed marine diesel engine
- Speed: 13.5 knots (25.0 km/h; 15.5 mph)
- Capacity: 39,288 m^{2} (422,890 sq ft)

Algoma Mariner is a Canadian lake freighter delivered to Algoma Central on 31 May 2011. The bulk carrier was the first new Canadian-flagged vessel on the Great Lakes in 25 years. Algoma Mariner is a Seawaymax vessel, designed to carry dry bulk through the Saint Lawrence Seaway and Great Lakes. The vessel was constructed at the Chengxi Shipyard in China and is currently in service.

== Description ==
Algoma Mariner is a self-unloading dry-bulk carrier designed by Deltamarin that has a gross tonnage (GT) of 24,535 tons, a net tonnage (NT) of 9,504 tons and a deadweight tonnage (DWT) of 38,000 tons. The vessel is 225.56 m (740 ft 0 in) long overall and 219.51 m (720 ft 2 in) between perpendiculars, with a beam of 23.74 m (77 ft 11 in) and a depth of 15 m (49 ft 3 in). Algoma Mariner has a capacity of 39,288 m^{3} (1,387,400 cu ft) and is equipped with an 80.0 m (262.5 ft) self-unloading boom that services six cargo holds. The self-unloading system is equipped with dust suppression technology. The vessel is powered by a 9,600 hp (7,159 kW) 6-cylinder MAN 2-stroke low-speed marine diesel engine that gives the vessel a maximum speed of 13.5 knots (25.0 km/h; 15.5 mph).

== Construction ==
In the late 2000s, Algoma Central sent two vessels to the Chengxi Shipyard in Jiangyin, China for major reconstruction work. The work involved the construction of a new forebody for both vessels, which would be mated to the vessels' existing aft end. The first vessel, Algobay, was rebuilt from 2007 to 2009 and reentered service in 2010.

The second vessel, Algoport, sailed from Hamilton, Ontario in June 2009 for the refurbishment work. She transited the Panama Canal in July, and was to be towed from Panama to China by the tug Pacific Hickory. The tug crew encountered a large storm in early September, and the Algoport sank on 6 September 2009. Following the loss of the Algoport, Algoma Central ordered a new aft section based on the Equinox-class design, to be constructed as an entirely new vessel. Algoma Mariner's keel was laid down on 21 October 2010 by Chengxi Shipyard, of Jiangyin, China for Algoma Central with the yard number 324. The vessel was completed on 31 May 2011.

== Service history ==
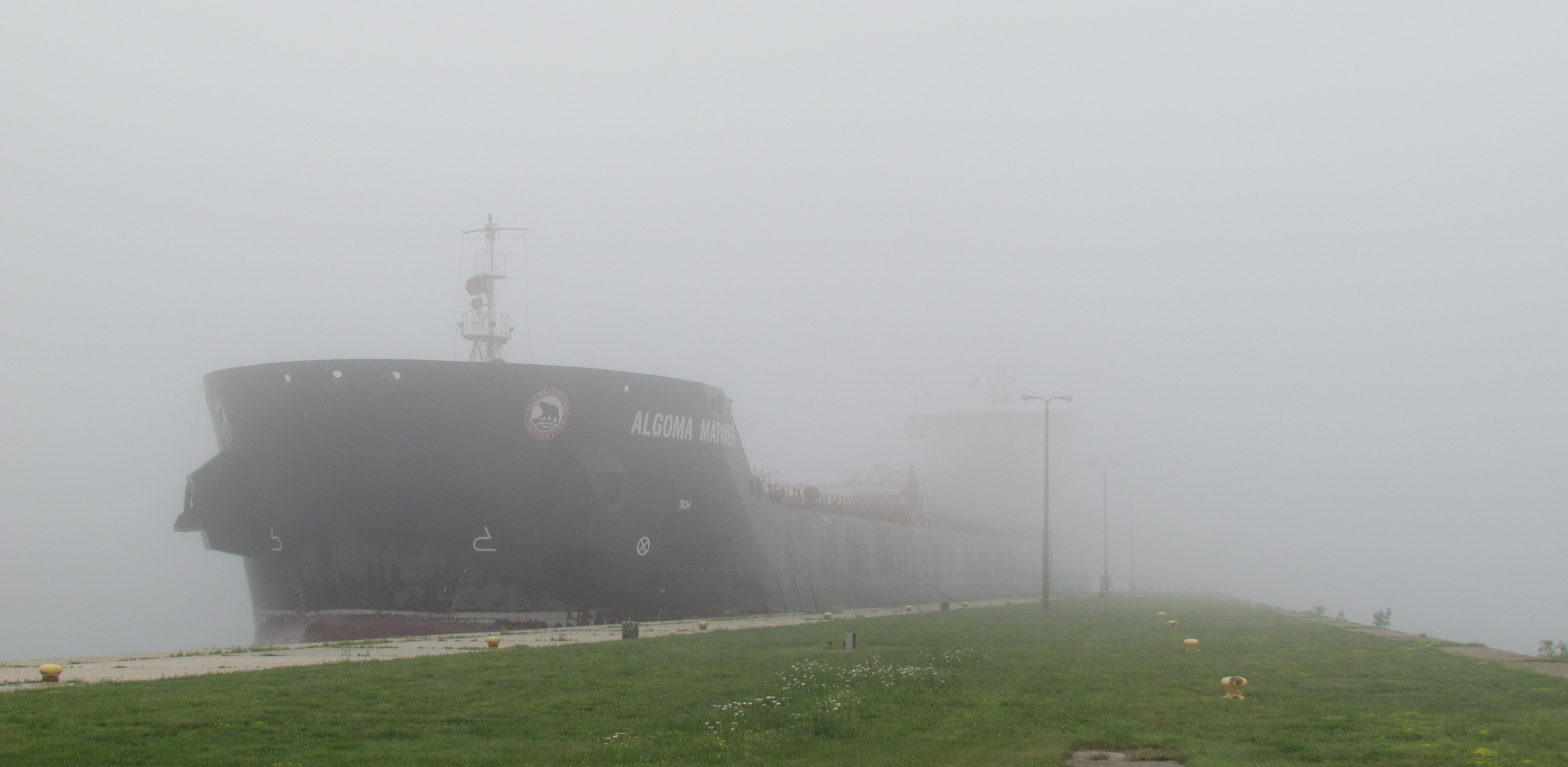
Algoma Mariner in fog near the Soo Locks, 2012

Algoma Mariner departed China, sailed across the Pacific Ocean to the Panama Canal, passed through it and sailed up the eastern seaboard of North American to arrive at the vessel's first Canadian port of call, Port-Cartier, Quebec on 2 August. Algoma Mariner was christened in Port Colborne, Ontario on 25 August 2011, by Lisa Badawey, wife of Port Colborne's mayor Vance Badawey. The vessel cost over CAD$50 million to construct.

Algoma Mariner's port of registry is Port Colborne, marking the first new Canadian-flagged vessel on the Great Lakes in 25 years upon her arrival. The vessel serves ports along the Great Lakes delivering dry bulk goods such as iron ore, coal, grain salt and aggregates. Algoma Mariner's sister ship is Algobay.
