= Algoma Provider =

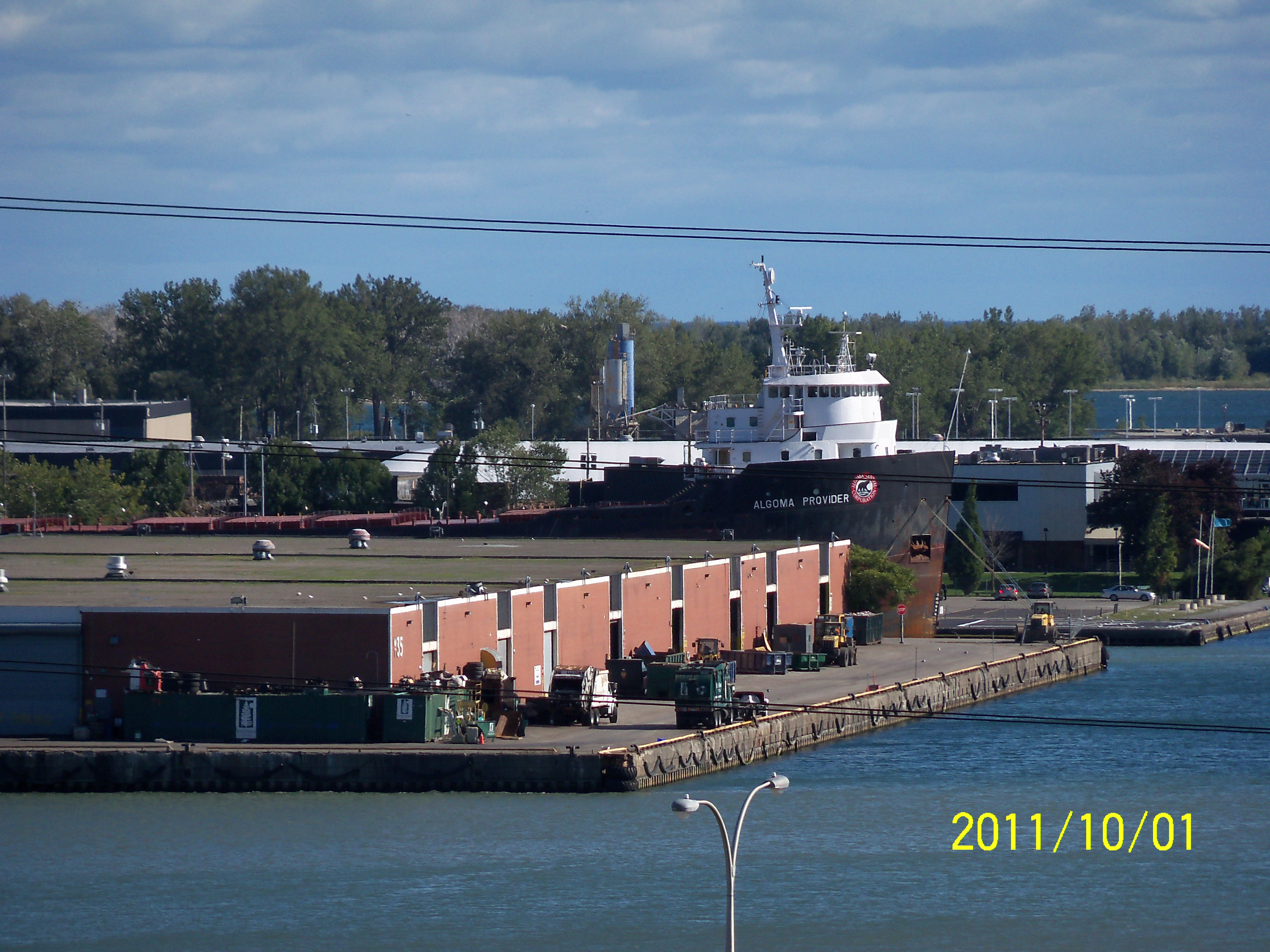
- Algoma Provider moored in Toronto's Polson slip, in October 2011

History
- Name: Murray Bay (1963–1994); Canadian Provider (1994–2011); Algoma Provider (2011–2013); Ovi (2013)
- Owner: Canadian Steamship Lines (1963–1994); Upper Lakes Shipping (1994–2011); Algoma Central (2011–2013)
- Port of registry: (Canada) Collingwood, Ontario (1963–1971); (Canada) Montreal, Quebec (1971–1984); (Canada) Toronto, Ontario (1984–2013)
- Builder: Collingwood Shipyards, Collingwood, Ontario
- Yard number: 177
- Laid down: 22 October 1962
- Launched: 3 May 1963
- Completed: 18 July 1963
- In service: 1963
- Out of service: 2013
- Identification: IMO number: 5407277
- Fate: Broken up 2013

General characteristics
- Type: Lake freighter
- Tonnage: 17,873 GRT; 26,930 DWT
- Length: 222.5 m (730 ft 0 in) oa; 216.1 m (709 ft 0 in) pp
- Beam: 23.0 m (75 ft 6 in)
- Draught: 11.9 m (39 ft 0 in)
- Installed power: 9,000 shp (6,711 kW) steam turbine
- Propulsion: 1 × fixed pitch propeller
- Speed: 15 knots (28 km/h)

Algoma Provider was a Canadian lake freighter, which operated from 1963 to 2013 under the flag of several shipping lines. She was built to seawaymax dimensions at the Collingwood Shipyards in Collingwood, Ontario for Canada Steamship Lines. She was powered by a steam turbine, and was the company's last steam-powered vessel. Initially named Murray Bay, the ship was sold in 1994 to Upper Lakes Shipping, which renamed the vessel Canadian Provider. In 2011, Upper Lakes Shipping sold its entire fleet to Algoma Central, which renamed the lake freighter Algoma Provider. The vessel continued in service until 2013, when she was sold to be broken up for scrap. The ship was renamed Ovi for her journey to the scrapyard in Turkey. During her career, the ship carried bulk cargoes to destinations along the Saint Lawrence Seaway and Great Lakes.

== Description ==
The ship was built to seawaymax dimensions, which are the maximum dimensions a ship could be to enter the locks of the Saint Lawrence Seaway. The lake freighter was 222.5 m (730 ft 0 in) long overall and 216.1 m (709 ft 0 in) between perpendiculars with a beam of 23.0 m (75 ft 6 in). The vessel had a maximum draught of 11.9 m (39 ft 0 in) and a maximum summer draught of 8.4 m (27 ft 7 in).

The ship was powered by a John Inglis steam turbine fed by two Babcock & Wilcox water-tube boilers turning one fixed pitch propeller, rated at 9,000 shaft horsepower (6,711 kW). The vessel had a maximum speed of 15 knots (28 km/h). The lake freighter had a gross register tonnage (GRT) of 17,873 tons and a deadweight tonnage of 26,930 tons. The ship had 17 hatches service 6 holds.

== Service history ==
The ship was ordered by Canada Steamship Lines and her keel was laid down on 22 October 1962 by Collingwood Shipyards at Collingwood, Ontario with the yard number 177. The vessel was launched on 3 May 1963 with the name Murray Bay. This was in keeping with Canada Steamship Lines naming conventions of naming their vessels after Canadian bays and inlets, with the ship named after Murray Bay. Construction of Murray Bay was completed on 18 July 1963 with the ship being registered at Collingwood.

Murray Bay sailed on her maiden voyage on 18 July 1963 to Taconite Harbor, Minnesota. After entering service Murray Bay was used to transport bulk cargoes to destinations in the Saint Lawrence Seaway and Great Lakes. Cargoes included iron ore, grain, coal and cement. In 1971, the ship was chartered by Pipe Line Tankers and the vessel was registered in Montreal, Quebec. In 1984, ownership returned to Canada Steamship Lines and the ship was registered in Toronto, Ontario. On 6 August 1986, Murray Bay nearly collided with William J. Delancey at Duluth, Minnesota when high winds pushed the vessels within 9 metres (30 ft) of each other. The ship was taken out of service by Canada Steamship Lines on 21 December 1993 and sold to Upper Lakes Shipping along with several other vessels. In Canada Steamship Lines service, Murray Bay carried 741 cargoes.

Upper Lakes Shipping renamed her Canadian Provider and reactivated the ship in October 1994, under the management of Seaway Bulk Carriers of Winnipeg, Manitoba. Canadian Provider was used primarily to carry grain and was dependent on the commodity, sailing only when required by the industry. In September 2001, Canadian Provider was towed from Toronto to Hamilton, Ontario and rafted to Windoc, which had hit a bridge and caught fire. The wheat Windoc had been transporting was transferred to Canadian Provider, which would carry the cargo on to Montreal. After two weeks, Canadian Provider sailed with almost all of Windoc's cargo, less 5,000 tons.

In 2004, Canadian Provider collided with the Redpath Sugar dock in Toronto. The collision caused extensive bow damage to the ship and damage to the dock. The ship remained in Toronto until 20 May 2005 when she was towed to Hamilton for repairs. Following a survey of the ship, Canadian Provider returned to active service on 5 May 2006. In October 2010 the vessel lost a man overboard. Both the United States Coast Guard and Canadian Coast Guard found no trace of the crew member after a search.

In 2011 Upper Lakes Shipping sold its entire fleet to Algoma Central. Several members of the fleet were immediately scrapped, but Canadian Provider was retained and renamed Algoma Provider. The ship saw two further years of service. In August 2012 it was found that one of the ship's fuel tanks had cracked, but no leaks were found. The ship continued in service until arriving at Montreal on 30 December 2012. There the vessel was laid up until being sold for scrap in 2013. The ship was renamed Ovi, the three middle letters of her last name, for her final voyage – a tow to a breaker's yard in Aliağa, Turkey.

== Sources ==
- Bawal, Raymond A. Jr. (2009). Twilight of the Great Lakes Steamer. Clinton Township, Michigan: Inland Expressions. ISBN 978-0-9818157-2-5.
- Gillham, Skip (1999). The Postwar Ships of Canada Steamship Lines. Vineland, Ontario: Glenaden Press. ISBN 0-9684341-0-X.
- "Murray Bay (5407277)". Miramar Ship Index.
- Smith, Maurice D. (2005). Steamboats on the Lakes. Toronto: James Lorimer & Company. ISBN 1-55028-885-7.
