= Michipicoten =

Michipicoten, a word in the Ojibwe language meaning "big bluffs," can refer to:

Places in Ontario, Canada

- Michipicoten Provincial Park
- Michipicoten River
- Michipicoten Island, an island in Lake Superior that is also an Ontario Parks provincial park
- Michipicoten First Nation, an Ojibway First Nation band government
- Wawa, Ontario, formerly known as Michipicoten Township
  - includes the communities of Michipicoten Harbour and Michipicoten River

Other

- Michipicoten (ship, 1952), a lake freighter operated by Lower Lakes Towing
