= MV Tim S. Dool =

Bulk carrier ship in Canada

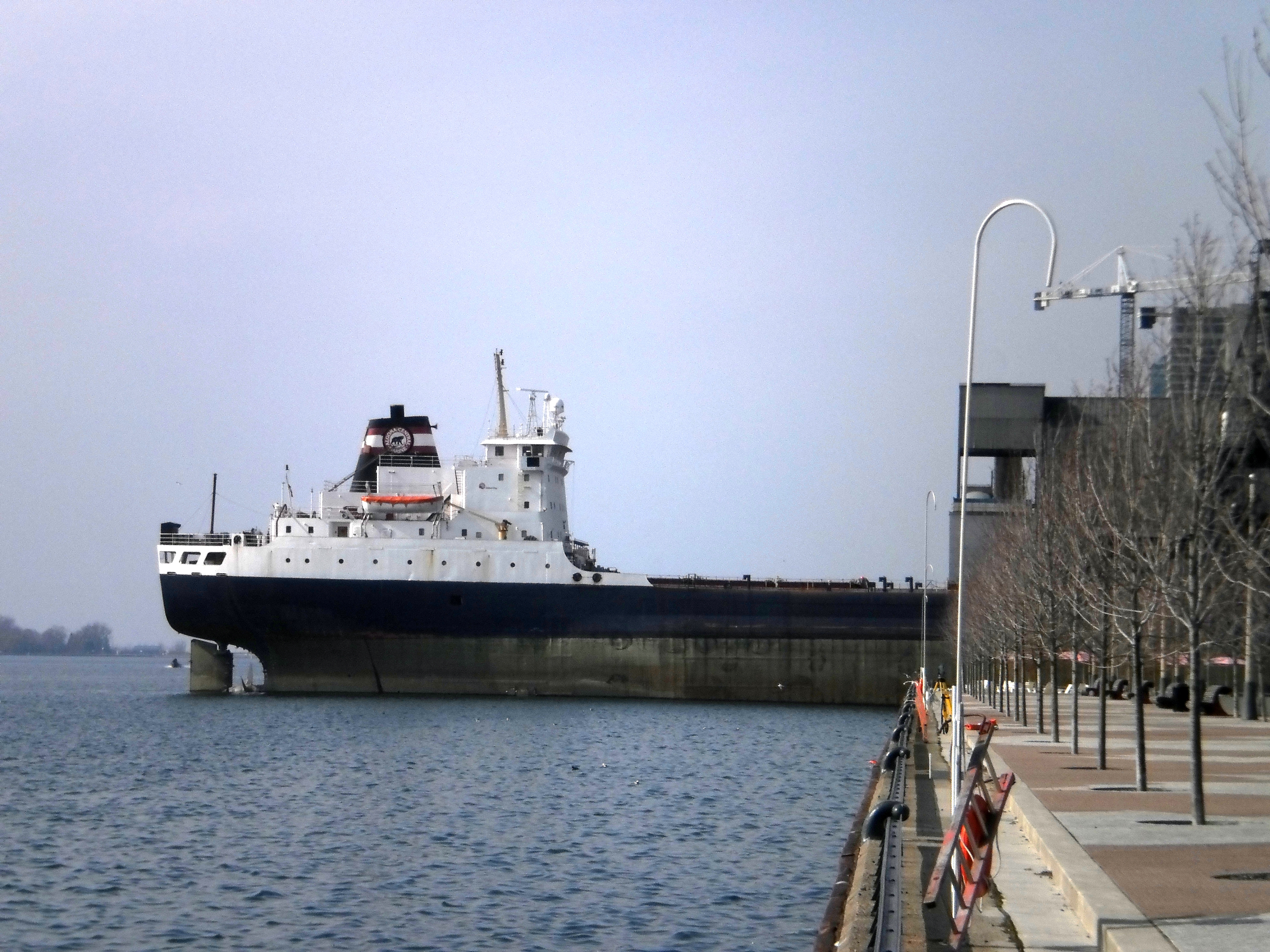
- Tim S. Dool, the second lake freighter to have just a single superstructure in the stern, moored in Toronto

History
- Name: Senneville; Algoville; Tim S. Dool
- Builder: Saint John Shipbuilding, Saint John, New Brunswick
- Yard number: 1084
- Laid down: 30 January 1967
- Launched: 15 October 1967
- Completed: 3 November 1967
- Identification: IMO number: 6800919
- Status: In active service

General characteristics as built
- Type: Bulk carrier
- Tonnage: 18,845 GRT; 29,021 DWT
- Length: 222.5 m (730 ft 0 in) oa; 216.6 m (710 ft 8 in) pp
- Beam: 22.9 m (75 ft 2 in)
- Installed power: MaK 8M43C 8-cylinder diesel engine
- Propulsion: 1 shaft
- Speed: 15.5 knots (28.7 km/h; 17.8 mph)

MV Tim S. Dool is an Algoma Central-owned seawaymax lake freighter built in 1967, by the Saint John Shipbuilding and Dry Dock Co. in Saint John, New Brunswick. She initially entered service as Senneville when she sailed as part of the fleet of Mohawk Navigation Company. Senneville was the second lake freighter constructed with a single superstructure at the stern. In 1981, the ship was sold to Pioneer Shipping. That company sold the vessel to Algoma Central in 1994 who renamed the ship Algoville. The bulk carrier got her current name in 2008. Tim S. Dool is currently in active service on the Great Lakes.

== Description ==
Tim S. Dool as constructed was 222.5 m (730 ft 0 in) long overall and 216.6 m (710 ft 8 in) between perpendiculars with a beam of 22.9 m (75 ft 2 in). The ship had a gross register tonnage (GRT) of 18,845 and a deadweight tonnage of 29,021. In 1996, the ship was widened, with her beam being expanded to 23.7 m (77 ft 9 in). Her current GRT is 18,700 and DWT, 28,471. The ship was initially powered by a MAN K6Z78/155 6-cylinder diesel engine that drove one controllable pitch propeller, rated at 9,900 brake horsepower (7,400 kW) and a 1,000-horsepower (750 kW) bow thruster. In 2007, the ship was re-engined with a MaK 8M43C 8-cylinder diesel engine rated at 10,730 brake horsepower (8,000 kW). The vessel has a maximum speed of 15.5 knots (28.7 km/h; 17.8 mph). Tim S. Dool was the second lake freighter constructed to a single-superstructure at the stern design as lake freighters had previously been built with two superstructures, located at the stern and bow. Tim S. Dool is of seawaymax dimensions.

== Service history ==
The ship was ordered by the Mohawk Navigation Company from Saint John Shipbuilding for construction at their yard in Saint John, New Brunswick. The vessel's keel was laid down on 30 January 1967 and the ship was given the yard number 1084. The ship was launched on 15 October 1967 and named Senneville, for a town in Quebec. The ship was completed on 3 November 1967 and registered in Montreal. Initially the Mohawk Navigation Company operated the ship, carrying grain for James Richardson & Sons, Limited. In 1969, operation of the ship passed to Scott Misener Steamships, with the Mohawk Navigation Company retaining ownership. On 3 July 1973, Senneville lost power in Montreal and struck a pier, causing damage to the ship's bow. Senneville set rye and soybean grain-carrying records on the Great Lakes in 1975 and 1977 respectively. On 3 October 1977, the ship went aground at Thunder Bay, Ontario carrying a load of grain. After removing some cargo, the ship was freed on 4 October. A crack in one of the ballast tanks was discovered and repaired.

In 1980, Pioneer Shipping, a division of James Richardson & Sons, Limited acquired the vessel, which continued to be operated by Misener Transportation. Following the collapse of a joint business venture with other Great Lakes shipping companies, Pioneer Shipping sold Senneville to Algoma Central along with Silver Isle for CAN$5.7 million in April 1994. The vessel was renamed Algoville. In October 1996, the ship underwent a CAN$6.7 million refit at Port Weller Dry Docks, St. Catharines, Ontario that widened the vessel. On 1 May 2006, Algoville suffered engine trouble and was towed to Goderich, Ontario. There, temporary repairs were effected and the vessel sailed for Quebec City to unload her cargo of grain. Algoville then travelled to Hamilton, Ontario to undergo permanent repairs at Heddle Marine, where the ship was re-engined. On 25 January 2007, while in the dockyard a fire broke out below decks. No injuries were reported and no damage was done to the ship. Algoville returned to active service on 21 October 2007.

In 2008, Algoma Central renamed her Tim S. Dool after a former President of Algoma Central. The ship's registry was changed to St. Catharines, Ontario. On 26 May 2016, Tim S. Dool lost power on Lake Superior 65 nautical miles (120 km; 75 mi) northwest of Whitefish Point. The ship was towed to port by the tugboat Lady Anglian. The ship's tow past the mouth of St. Marys River led a second ship, Roger Blough, going aground while trying to pass Tim S. Dool and Lady Anglian.

On 23 November 2024, Tim S. Dool ran aground in the St. Lawrence River in U.S. waters near Morrisburg, Ontario. There were no reported injuries, and the ship did not block the main channel. Three tugboats sailed from Quebec City and arrived to help free the vessel on 25 November, but after a couple of hours, the ship remained stuck. The marine salvage team then changed plans and chose to lighter the lake freighter in order to aid in the freeing of the ship. The lake freighter was refloated on 16 December.
