= Murray Bay =

Murray Bay may refer to:

- La Malbaie, a municipality in Quebec formerly known as Murray Bay
- Algoma Provider, a Canadian lake freighter originally known as Murray Bay
