= David Z =

David Z may refer to:

- David Z (producer) (1948–2026), American record producer and songwriter
- David Z. or David Z. Norton, a sister ship of the Robert S. Pierson
