= Sauniere (ship) =

Bulk carrier

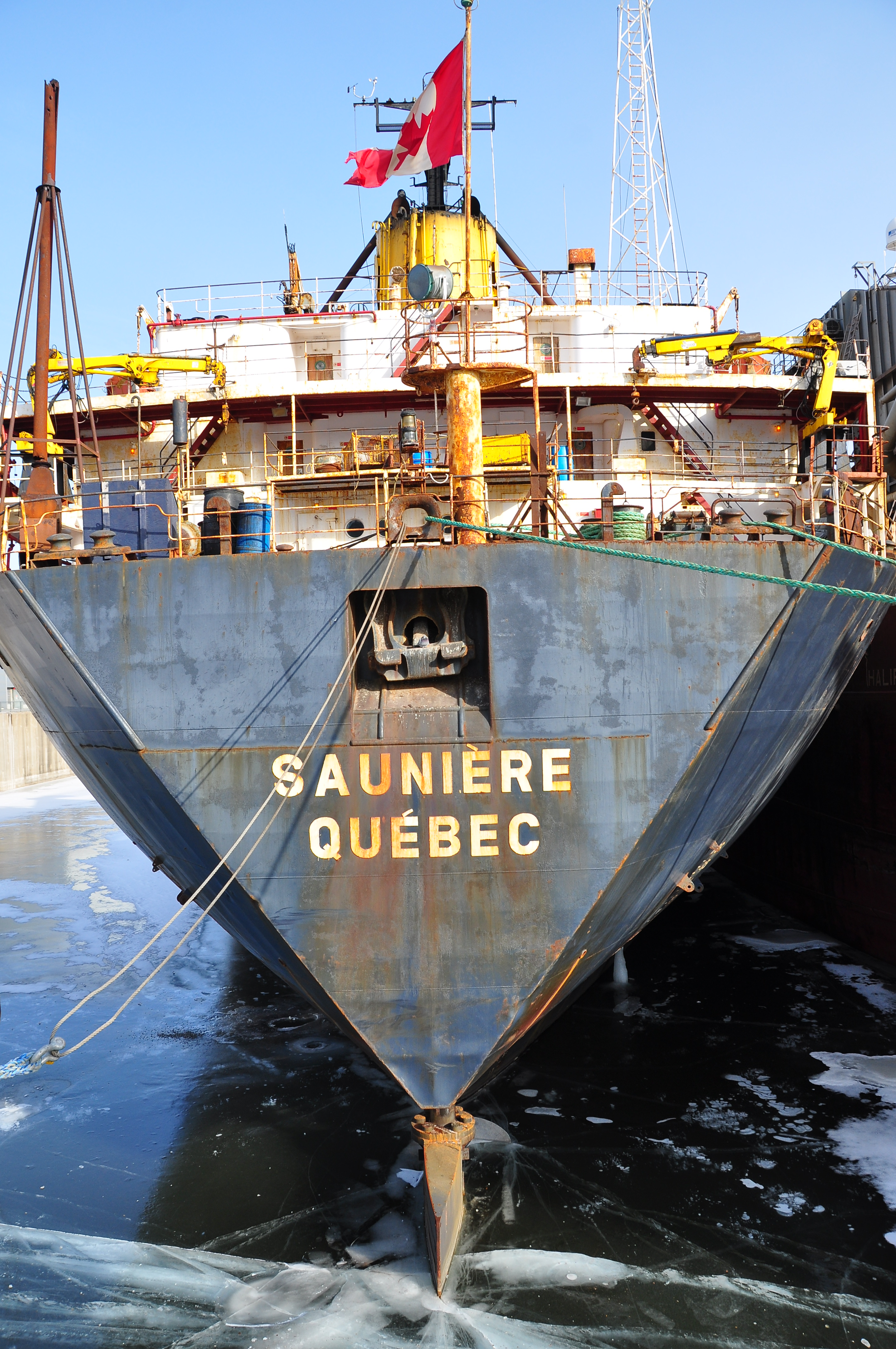
- Algoma Central bulk carrier Sauniere moored in the Port de Montréal.

History
- Name: Bulknes (1970); Brooknes (1970–1976); Algosea (1976–1982); Sauniere (1982–2010)
- Owner: Kristian Jebsens Rederi A/S (1970–1976); Algoma Central Marine (1976–2010)
- Port of registry: West Germany (1970–1982); Canada (1982–2011)
- Builder: Lithgows Ltd., Glasgow, Scotland
- Yard number: 1177
- Laid down: 20 January 1970
- Launched: 2 September 1970
- Completed: 18 December 1970
- Out of service: 2009
- Identification: IMO number: 7028489
- Fate: Scrapped 2010

General characteristics as built
- Type: Self-unloading bulk carrier
- Tonnage: 13,098 GRT; 21,200 DWT
- Length: 158.6 m (520 ft 4 in) oa; 151.7 m (497 ft 8 in) pp
- Beam: 22.9 m (75 ft 2 in)
- Depth: 12.8 m (42 ft 0 in)
- Installed power: 2 × 4,400 bhp (3,300 kW) Helsingor Skibs & Msk. diesel engines
- Propulsion: 4-blade controllable-pitch propeller; 600 hp (450 kW) bow thruster
- Speed: 15 knots (28 km/h; 17 mph)

Sauniere was a self-unloading bulk carrier operated by Algoma Central. Laid down as Bulknes, before launching the vessel's name was changed to Brooknes. The ship was constructed and completed in 1970. The ship was initially owned by the Swedish company Kristian Jebsens Rederi A/S. In 1974, Algoma Central purchased the vessel, registered the ship in West Germany and renamed it Algosea. Algoma Central sent the ship to Swan Hunter in England to be lengthened. Emerging in 1976, Algosea sailed for Canada for conversion to a self-unloading bulk carrier at Herb Fraser and Associates in Port Colborne, Ontario. Algosea, which transported road salt between ports in the Gulf of St. Lawrence, Saint Lawrence Seaway and Great Lakes suffered three collisions and two groundings during its career. The Algosea was renamed Sauniere in 1982 and continued in service until 2009 when the bulk carrier was sold for scrap and broken up in Turkey in 2010.

== Description ==
The ship as constructed was 158.6 m (520 ft 4 in) long overall and 151.7 m (497 ft 8 in) between perpendiculars with a beam of 22.9 m (75 ft 2 in). Brooknes had a gross register tonnage (GRT) of 13,098 and a deadweight tonnage (DWT) of 21,200. The ship had a molded depth of 12.80 m (42 ft 0 in) and had six hatches for six holds. The bulk carrier was equipped with six Velle-type 12-tonne (12-long-ton; 13-short-ton) derricks with one pair forward facing, the other aft. Brooknes was initially powered by two Helsingor Skibs & Msk. 8-cylinder diesel engines rated at 8,800 brake horsepower (6,562 kW). The engines powered one shaft turning a 4-bladed controllable pitch propeller and a 600 hp (450 kW) bow thruster. The ship had a maximum speed of 15 knots (28 km/h; 17 mph).

In 1975, the vessel was lengthened to 195.9 m (642 ft 9 in) overall and the ship's tonnage increased to 16,709 GRT and 24,481 DWT. Brooknes was given an additional hold, had its derricks removed, and given self-unloading equipment. The self-unloading equipment was composed of a stern-mounted 75-metre (245 ft) discharge boom that could discharge at 3,810 metric tons (3,750 long tons) per hour. In 1981, the ship was re-engined with two MaK 6M552AK 6-cylinder diesel engines rated at 8,800 bhp (6,562 kW).

== Construction and career ==
Algoma Central ordered the ship from Lithgows Ltd. by Kristian Jebsens Rederi A/S and was laid down on 20 January 1970 at their yard in Glasgow, Scotland with the yard number 1170. Laid down as Bulknes, the ship was renamed Brooknes before launching. The ship was launched on 2 September 1970 and completed on 18 December 1970. Brooknes was registered in Hamburg, Germany. In 1973, Langra Schiffahrtsges GmbH and Company KG took over operations of the vessel while ownership remained with Kristian Jebsens Rederi A/S.

In 1974, Algoma Central sought a replacement vessel for Roy A. Jodrey which had sunk on 21 November. On 1 January 1976, Algoma Central purchased Brooknes for US$7.5 million. Algoma Central renamed the vessel Algosea and sent it to Swan Hunter's yard at North Shields, England to be lengthened. Emerging in 1976, Algosea then crossed the Atlantic Ocean to undergo conversion to a self-discharging bulk carrier at Herb Fraser and Associates at their yard in Port Colborne, Ontario. While moving through the Welland Canal, Algosea had its first collision, hitting the canal wall at Lock 1, losing its cables and being blown across Lock 2. Algosea entered active service on 19 October 1976. Algosea's primary cargo was road salt. Algosea delivered its cargo along the eastern North American seaboard as far south as the Gulf of Mexico, the Gulf of St. Lawrence, the Saint Lawrence Seaway and the Great Lakes.

Algosea suffered internal damage during a storm in 1976. After experiencing issues with the engines of Algosea, Algoma Central ordered the ship to be re-engined at Halifax, Nova Scotia in late-1981, early 1982. In 1982, Algosea was chartered to Navigation Sonamar and operated by the Societe Québécoise d'Exploration Minière (SOQUEM) to transport salt from the Magdalen Islands to ports along the North American east coast, the Great Lakes and Saint Lawrence Seaway. On 6 June 1982, Algosea collided with a pier at Port Weller, Ontario. The ship's bow was extensively damaged, and the ship was forced to sail to Port Arthur Shipbuilding to have its bow replaced. The new bow was ice-strengthened and the ship returned to service in August re-flagged to Quebec City, Quebec and renamed Sauniere, which is French for "salter".

On 26 April 1984, Sauniere ran aground in the St. Lawrence River near Trois-Rivières, Quebec. The ship suffered no damage and continued on to Baltimore, Maryland to pick up its next cargo. In December 1985 unionized longshoremen in Providence, Rhode Island picketed Sauniere because it unloaded rock salt without union help. On 15 December 1995, the ship ran aground at Fairport, Ohio, again without damage. On 15 September 1996, Sauniere grounded on Bay State Shoal in the St. Lawrence River near Brockville, Ontario. The bottom shell plating on the starboard side was damaged and the #1 starboard ballast tank being was holed in three places. After being freed, Sauniere sailed to Hamilton, Ontario to unload its cargo and then to Port Weller Dry Docks at St. Catharines, Ontario for repairs.

Sauniere underwent a major refit in late 1998, early 1999, followed by an even larger one in late 2001 and early 2002. On 21 September 2006, the ship lost its starboard anchor near Grande Entrée, Magdalen Islands. On 18 September 2007, the ship collided with the south sea wall of the Canso Causeway. The vessel suffered a dent above the waterline outside the #1 portside tank. A crack was discovered in the forepeak in January 2009 that necessitated immediate repairs. On 1 March 2009, the ship was laid up at Montreal, Quebec. Sauniere was sold to Avsar GS in 2011, towed to Aliağa, Turkey and broken up with demolition listed as complete on 2 July 2011.
