= MV Buffalo =

Diesel-powered lake freighter

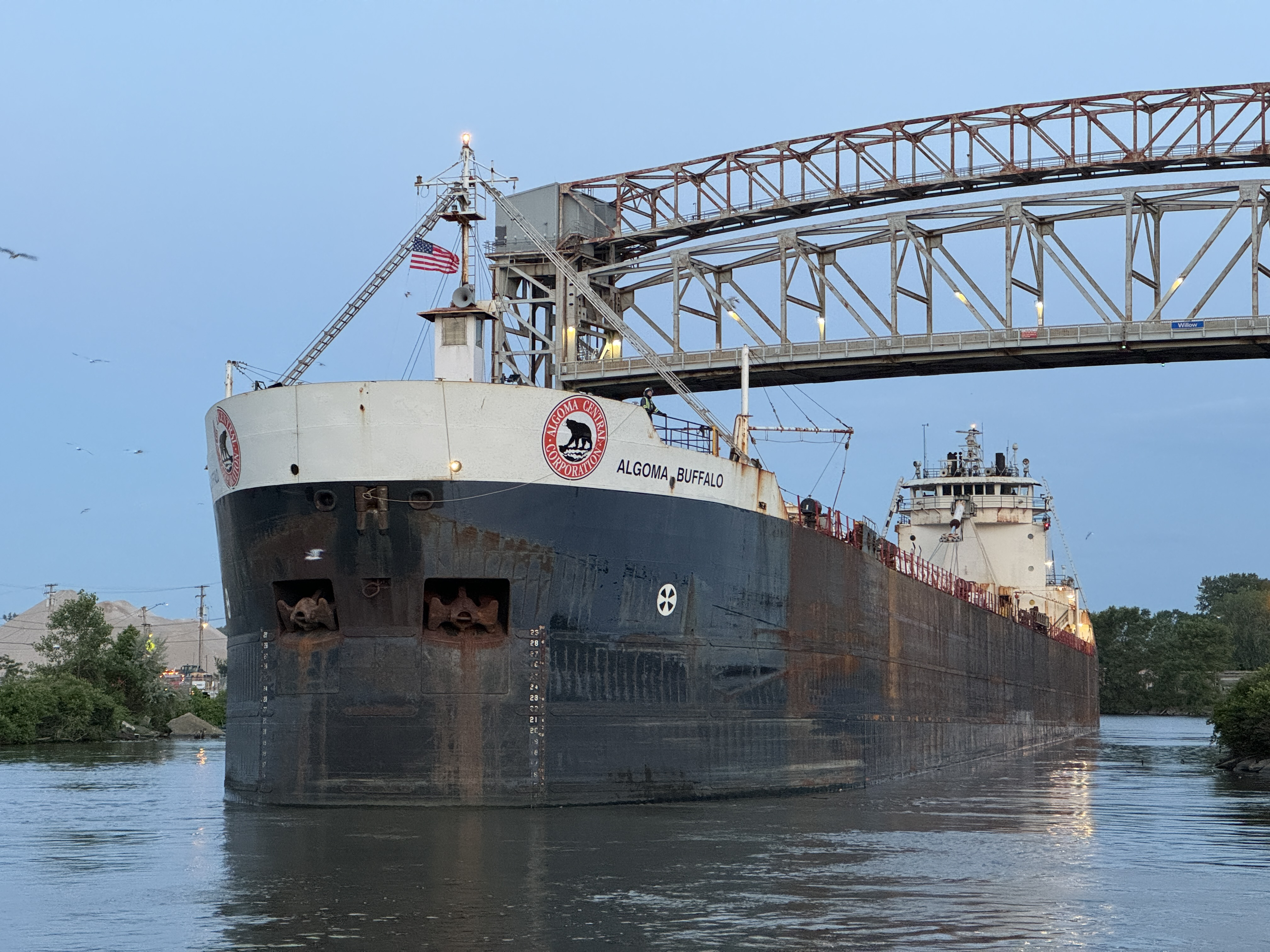
- Algoma Buffalo going to the Cargill salt mine in Cleveland, June 2024

History
- Name: Buffalo (1978–2018); Algoma Buffalo (2018–present)
- Namesake: Buffalo, New York
- Owner: American Steamship Company (1978–1983); Lawrence Steamship Company (1983–1989, 1997–2018); Connecticut Bank and Trust Company (1989–1997); Algoma Central Corporation (2018–present)
- Port of registry: (United States) Wilmington, Delaware (1978–2018); (Canada) St. Catharines, Ontario (2018–present)
- Builder: Bay Shipbuilding Company, Sturgeon Bay, Wisconsin
- Yard number: 721
- Laid down: 12 May 1977
- Launched: 16 March 1978
- Completed: 23 September 1978
- In service: 1978
- Identification: Call sign: WXS6134; IMO number: 7620653
- Status: In service

General characteristics
- Type: Lake freighter
- Tonnage: 11,619 GT; 8,036 NT
- Length: 634 ft 10 in (193.5 m) (overall); 617 ft 2 in (188.1 m)
- Beam: 68 ft 3 in (20.8 m)
- Draft: 15 ft 3 1/2 in (4.7 m) (midsummer draft); 40 ft 0 in (12.2 m) (hull depth)
- Propulsion: 2 × 3,500 hp (2,600 kW) General Motors Electro Motive Division (EMD) diesel engines
- Speed: 14 knots (26 km/h; 16 mph)

Algoma Buffalo, formerly Buffalo, is a diesel-powered lake freighter acquired by Algoma Central Corporation in 2018. This vessel was built in 1978 by Bay Shipbuilding Company at their yard in Sturgeon Bay, Wisconsin for the American Steamship Company and included self-unloading technology. The ship is 634 feet 10 inches (193.50 m) long and 68 feet (21 m) wide, with a carrying capacity of 24,457 tons deadweight (DWT) (at midsummer draft), and is primarily used to ship road salt and construction goods. The vessel is currently in service.

== Description ==
Buffalo was constructed as a self-unloading lake freighter measuring 634 feet 10 inches (193.5 m) long overall and 617 feet 2 inches (188.1 m) between perpendiculars with a beam of 68 feet 3 inches (20.8 m), and a depth of 40 feet 0 inches (12.2 m). The vessel has a midsummer draft of 15 feet 3 1/2 inches (4.661 m). The ship was initially measured at 11,619 gross register tons (GRT) and 23,481 tons deadweight (DWT) when built, later being remeasured at the same gross tonnage (GT) with an 8,036 net tonnage (NT).

The vessel is powered by two 3,600-brake-horsepower (2,700 kW) single-acting, two-stroke cycle, V-20 cylinder diesel engines. The engines were constructed by the Electro-Motive Division of the General Motors Corporation. The engines turn a controllable pitch propeller through Falk reduction gears. This gives the vessel a maximum speed of 14 knots (26 km/h; 16 mph). Buffalo is equipped with both a 1,000 hp (750 kW) bow thruster and a 600 hp (450 kW) stern thruster.

Algoma Buffalo is equipped with a 250-foot-0-inch (76.2 m) discharge boom capable of swinging 90° to either side of the ship and luffing to 18°. The boom uses a belt gravity system and an incline belt elevator, capable of discharging up to 5,900 metric tons (5,800 long tons; 6,500 short tons) per hour. The vessel has a capacity of 744,712 ft^{3} (21,087.9 m^{3}) and has five holds.

== History ==
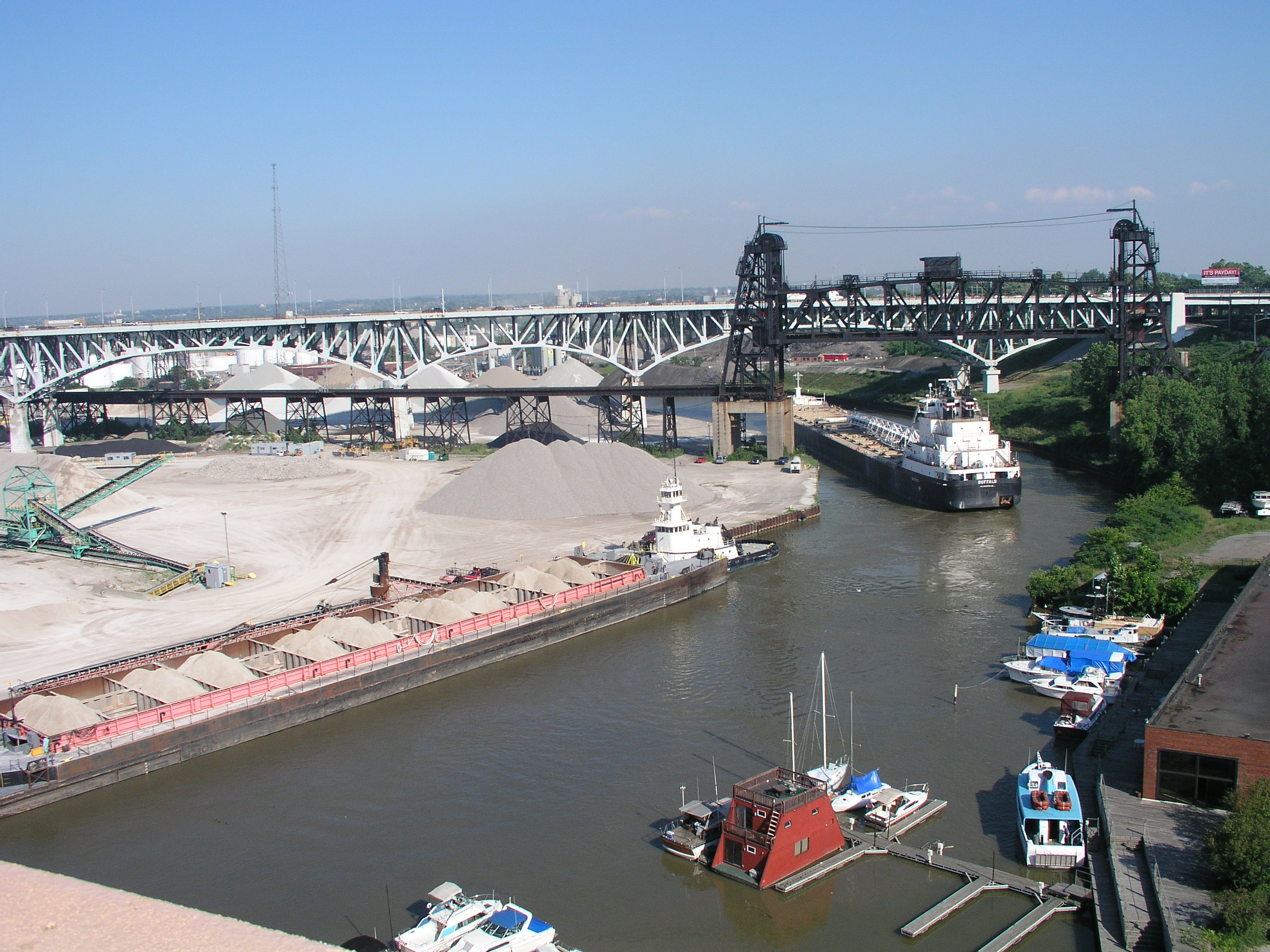
Buffalo at Cleveland in 2005

Buffalo was the seventh ship ordered by the American Shipping Company under Title XI of the United States' Merchant Marine Act of 1970. The program allowed U.S. shipping companies to construct new vessels or to modernize their existing fleet with government-guaranteed financing and tax deferred benefits. The vessel's keel was laid down by the Bay Shipbuilding Company at their yard in Sturgeon Bay, Wisconsin on 12 May 1977 with the yard number 721. The lake freighter was launched on 16 March 1978 and completed on 23 September 1978. The vessel was named for Buffalo, New York, the site of the American Shipping Company's headquarters.

Entering service in 1978 and registered in Wilmington, Delaware, Buffalo was used to transport bulk cargoes, such as iron ore pellets, coal, limestone and gypsum throughout the Great Lakes and St. Lawrence Seaway. In 1983, ownership of the lake freighter was transferred to the Lawrence Steamship Company, which kept the ship's registration in Wilmington. In 1989, the Connecticut Bank and Trust took over ownership of the vessel.

On 16 September 1990, Buffalo was passing the smaller tanker Jupiter in the harbor of Bay City, Michigan. Jupiter was alongside pumping its remaining cargo of 20,000 barrels (840,000 US gal) of unrefined, unleaded gasoline into tanks ashore when Buffalo's wake caused Jupiter to rock uncontrollably and lose connection to the pier. The transfer hoses from the ship to shore became untethered and resulting in an explosion and burning fuel to spill into the water. Eleven crew members of Jupiter were injured and a twelfth missing and presumed dead.

In 1997, ownership of Buffalo returned to the Lawrence Steamship Company. In late 1997 Buffalo struck the Detroit River Light, a lighthouse located in Lake Erie that marks the entrance into the Detroit River. A 25-foot (7.6 m) gash was torn across the bow. Buffalo began taking on water, but managed to proceed to the CSX coal dock in Toledo, Ohio. The lighthouse suffered minimal damage. Buffalo was sent for repairs at the Toledo shipyard. Damage to the bow was significant and in the subsequent United States Coast Guard investigation, human error by the ship's crew was given as the cause of the incident.

In late 2017 the ship was purchased by Algoma Central Corporation. The ship re-entered service in 2018 and the freighter was renamed Algoma Buffalo and re-registered to St. Catharines, Ontario. In Algoma service, the vessel is used to transport construction materials and road salt. In 2020, the vessel underwent repairs while laid up for the winter in Owen Sound, Ontario's harbour.
