= Algoma Equinox =

Lake freighter

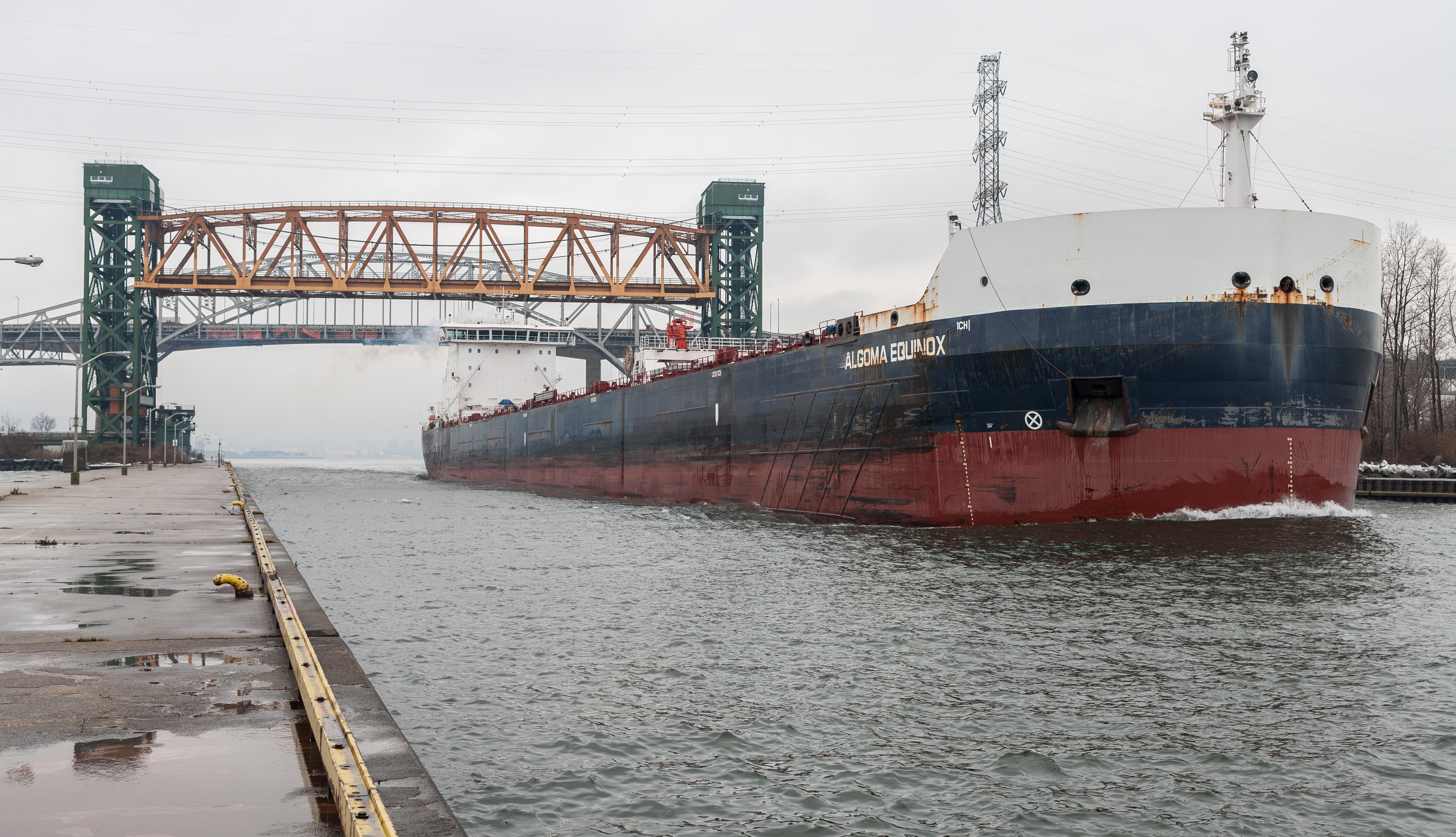
- Algoma Equinox in the Burlington Canal in 2019

History
- Name: Algoma Equinox
- Owner: Algoma Central
- Port of registry: St. Catharines, Canada
- Builder: Nantong Mingde Heavy Industries, Tongzhou, China
- Yard number: MD149
- Laid down: 21 April 2012
- Launched: 24 December 2012
- Completed: 25 September 2013
- In service: December 2013
- Identification: IMO number: 9613927
- Status: In active service

General characteristics
- Class & type: Equinox-class freighter
- Tonnage: 23,895 GT; 39,400 DWT
- Length: 225.6 m (740 ft 2 in) oa
- Beam: 23.8 m (78 ft 1 in)

Algoma Equinox is a lake freighter and lead ship of her class built for Algoma Central, a Canadian shipping company. The vessel was built to a new design by Nantong Mingde Heavy Industries at their shipyard in Tongzhou, China in 2013. The ship entered service in December 2013, operating in the Great Lakes and Saint Lawrence Seaway.

== Design and description ==
Algoma Equinox was constructed to a new design of lake freighters that operate on the Great Lakes by the design firm Delta Marine. Algoma Central asserted that new design and new technology would make the new vessels 45 percent more energy efficient than their earlier vessels. Algoma Equinox is a "gearless bulker" meaning she has to use shore facilities to load and unload. Two of the new gearless vessels will be owned by the Canadian Wheat Board, but operated by Algoma Central, on the Board's behalf.

Algoma Equinox is 225.6 m (740 ft 2 in) long overall with a beam of 23.8 m (78 ft 1 in). The vessel has a gross tonnage (GT) of 23,895 and a deadweight tonnage (DWT) of 39,400. Each crew member has an individual cabin, with an en-suite washroom, broadband internet, and satellite TV connections. The vessel can operate with a minimum of 18 crew.

== Service history ==
The vessel was ordered as part of Algoma Central's plan to renew their Great Lakes shipping fleet. The ship's keel was laid down on 21 April 2012 by Nantong Mingde Heavy Industries at their shipyard in Tongzhou, China. Algoma Equinox was launched on 24 December later that year and completed on 25 September 2013. The ship then crossed the Pacific Ocean and passed through the Panama Canal arriving at Port-Cartier, Quebec, in November 2013. The vessel made its maiden voyage through the Great Lakes and Saint Lawrence Seaway in December 2013. Algoma Equinox primarily transports iron ore and grain in the Great Lakes and Saint Lawrence Seaway.

Captain Ross Armstrong of Algoma Equinox received the Top Hat as the first ship through the Welland Canal for 2014 at the Welland Canals Centre at Lock 3 in St. Catharines, Ontario, on 28 March 2014. Due to ice conditions on Lake Erie, she was unable to complete the journey into the lake that day. Algoma Equinox was featured on Season 8 Episode 4 of the Discovery Channel's program Mighty Ships.
