= Algosoo (1974 ship) =

Canadian lake freighter ship

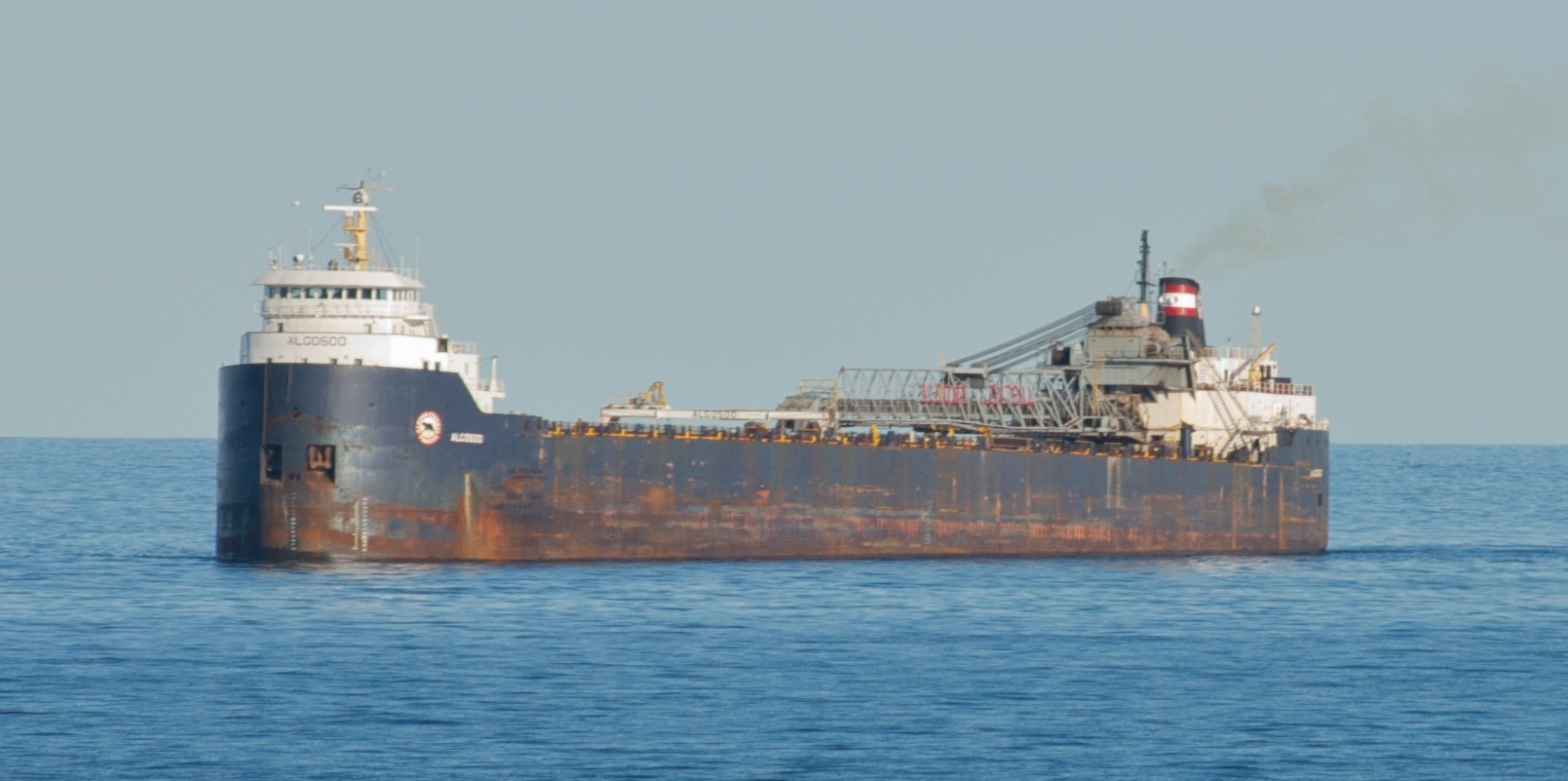
- Algosoo approaches Silver Bay in 2010

History
- Name: Algosoo
- Owner: Algoma Central
- Operator: Algoma Central
- Port of registry: (Canada) Sault Ste. Marie, Ontario
- Builder: Collingwood Shipbuilding, Collingwood, Ontario
- Yard number: 206
- Laid down: August 1973
- Launched: 24 July 1974
- Completed: 4 December 1974
- In service: 1974
- Out of service: 2015
- Identification: IMO number: 7343619
- Fate: Broken up for scrap 2016

General characteristics
- Type: Lake freighter
- Tonnage: 21,716 GT; 31,574 DWT
- Length: 222.5 m (730 ft 0 in) oa; 219.6 m (720 ft 6 in) pp
- Beam: 23.0 m (75 ft 6 in)
- Draught: 8.8 m (28 ft 10 in) (midsummer)
- Installed power: 2 × Crossley Pielstick 10PC2V diesel engines, 6,700 kW (9,000 hp)
- Propulsion: 1 screw
- Speed: 13 knots (24 km/h; 15 mph)

Algosoo was a lake freighter constructed for Algoma Central in 1974 by Collingwood Shipbuilding in Collingwood, Ontario. The second ship of the name, Algosoo was the last lake freighter built in the traditional design for use on the North American Great Lakes, where the bridge topped a superstructure right in the ship's bow, and a second superstructure topped her engines, right in the stern. The vessel was used to transport bulk cargoes between ports on the Great Lakes. In 1986, the ship suffered a serious fire and in 1994, was forced to run aground to avoid a collision. Algosoo transported her last cargo in late 2015 and was sailed to the breaking yard at Port Colborne, Ontario in October 2016.

== Design and description ==
Algosoo was a traditionally constructed lake freighter built for service on the North American Great Lakes and the St. Lawrence Seaway. A traditionally designed lake freighter has the bridge topping a superstructure right on the ship's bow, and a second superstructure topping the engines, right on the stern. Algosoo was 222.5 metres (730 ft 0 in) long overall and 219.6 m (720 ft 6 in) between perpendiculars with a beam of 23.0 m (75 ft 6 in) and a midsummer draught of 8.8 m (28 ft 10 in).

The ship was powered by two Crossley Pielstick single acting, four-stroke cycle 10PC2V diesel engines creating a total of 6,700 kilowatts (9,000 hp). The two engines were situated side-by-side with the drive shafts connected via a gear reduction box. This was tied to the single propeller shaft which turned a controllable pitch propeller, giving the vessel a maximum speed of 13 knots (24 km/h; 15 mph).

The lake freighter was initially measured at 21,723 gross register tons (GRT) and 31,574 tons deadweight (DWT) in 1974. The ship was later remeasured at 21,716 gross tonnage (GT) and the same deadweight tonnage. The vessel had five holds and 23 hatches and was equipped with self-unloading equipment consisting of a stern-mounted loop belt elevator. The elevator serviced a 77 m (252 ft) discharge boom that was capable of swinging 95 degrees to either side of the ship. Algosoo's designed discharge rate was 5,440 metric tons (5,350 long tons; 6,000 short tons) per hour.

== History ==
Algosoo was constructed by Collingwood Shipbuilding in Collingwood, Ontario, for the Algoma Central Railway's Marine Division. The vessel's keel being laid down in August 1973 with the yard number 206 and launched on 24 July 1974. Algosoo was completed on 4 December later that year, sponsored by Mrs. John Rhodes, the wife of John Rhodes, the Ontario provincial Minister of Transportation and Communication, the last traditionally-constructed laker built on the Great Lakes. The name of the vessel is a combination of the beginning of the owner's name "Algo" and the nickname "soo", of the city of the company's headquarters, Sault Ste. Marie, Ontario. Algosoo was registered in Sault Ste. Marie and entered service in 1974. The vessel's call sign was VGJD and IMO number 7343619.

Algosoo was used to transport bulk cargoes between ports on the Great Lakes. Cargoes consisted of coal/coke, aggregates, slag, iron ore/oxides, salt, fertilizers, grain products, gypsum, quartzite, and sand. The freighter set several load records on the Great Lakes, including those for wheat and salt. On 28 December 1976, Algosoo went aground in Lake St. Clair, which according the United States Coast Guard, was probably caused by ice on the lake. On 7 March 1986, while in winter lay up at Port Colborne, Ontario, there was a serious fire on Algosoo. The fire began near the conveyor belt, which soon spread to the stern. Firefighters lost control of the fire due to an inadequate water supply and a lengthy distance to the fire hydrant. The fire caused $16 million in damages to the ship. The laker was taken to the Port Weller Dry Docks at St. Catharines, Ontario for repairs.

In 1990, ownership of the vessel was transferred from Algoma Central Railway to Algoma Central Marine after the company was reorganized. The vessel's registration remained the same. From 1993 to 2000, the vessel was operated by the Seaway Self-Unloaders Company, a joint venture between Algoma Central Marine and the Upper Lakes Group.

On 25 March 1994 Algosoo was forced aground in Lake St. Francis in the St. Lawrence Seaway while being overtaken. The grounding caused approximately $1.2 million in hull damage. On 11 December of that year, the vessel was punctured by a steel obstruction while docking at Valleyfield, Quebec. In 1995, Algosoo damaged its propeller and leaked some oil in the St. Lawrence River. On 23 December 2000 Algosoo collided with the Canadian Coast Guard icebreaker CCGS Griffon while being freed from ice near the Toledo Channel in Lake Erie. On 26 December the freighter arrived for repairs at Hamilton, Ontario.

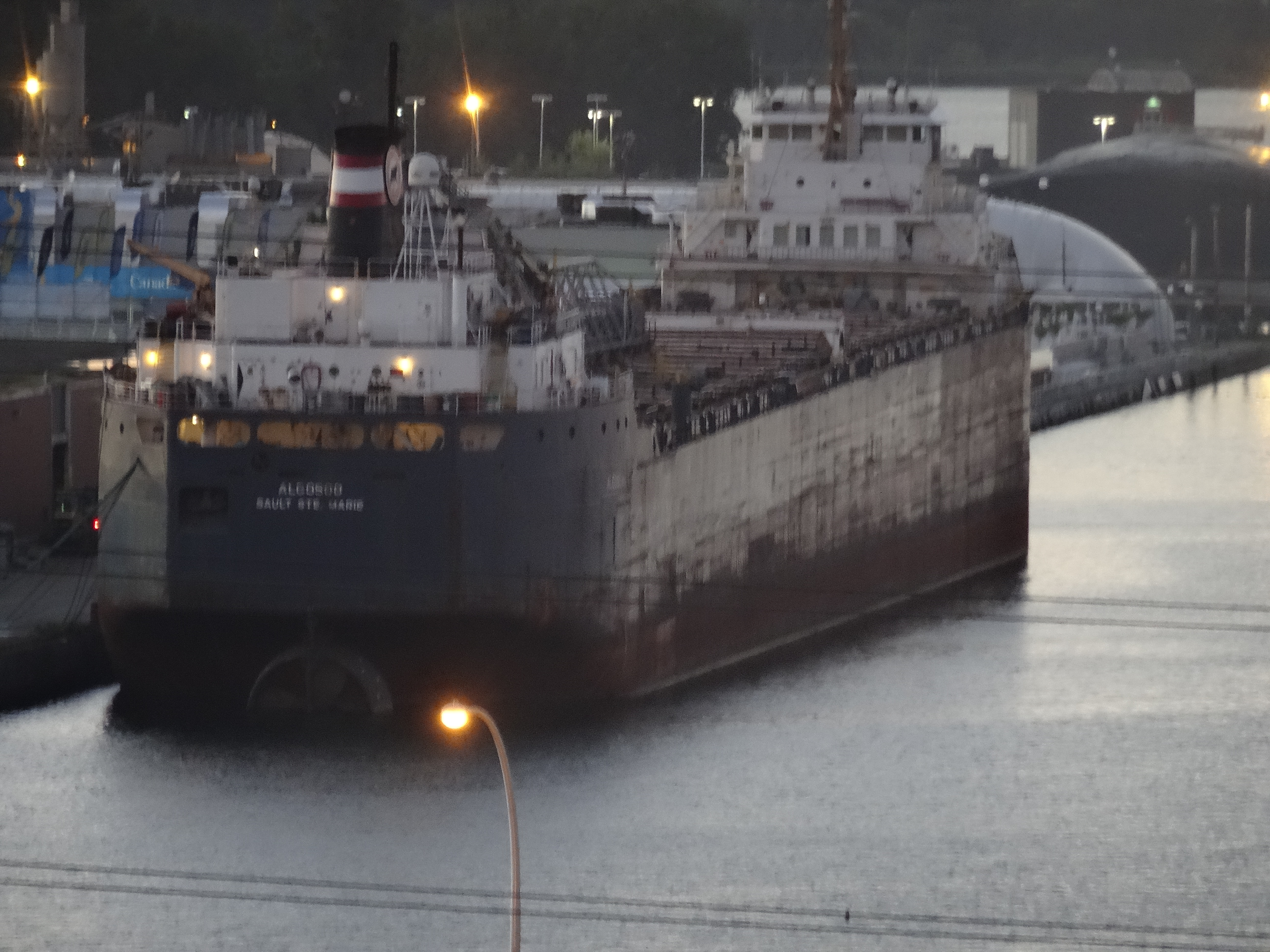
The Algosoo in Toronto in September 2016 before being broken up

In April 2002, fleetmate Algowood went aground in the St. Marys River, suffering significant damage. The damage caused the ship to list and was in danger of sinking. Algosoo was tasked on 17 April with taking on the ship's cargo of 29,500 tonnes (29,000 long tons) of coal and delivering it to Nanticoke, Ontario in order to lighten the damaged ship's load. Another incident followed on 11 August when the ship suffered a bow thruster failure at Clarkson, Ontario. The ship slid over her dropped anchor causing dents, gashes, and small holes. The vessel made her way to the closest shipyard, Verrault Shipyard in Les Méchins, Quebec, for repair.

The ship was active until the end of 2015. On 2 October 2016, Algosoo was sailed to Port Colborne to be broken up by International Marine Salvage.
