= MV Robert S. Pierson =

Lake freighter built in 1973

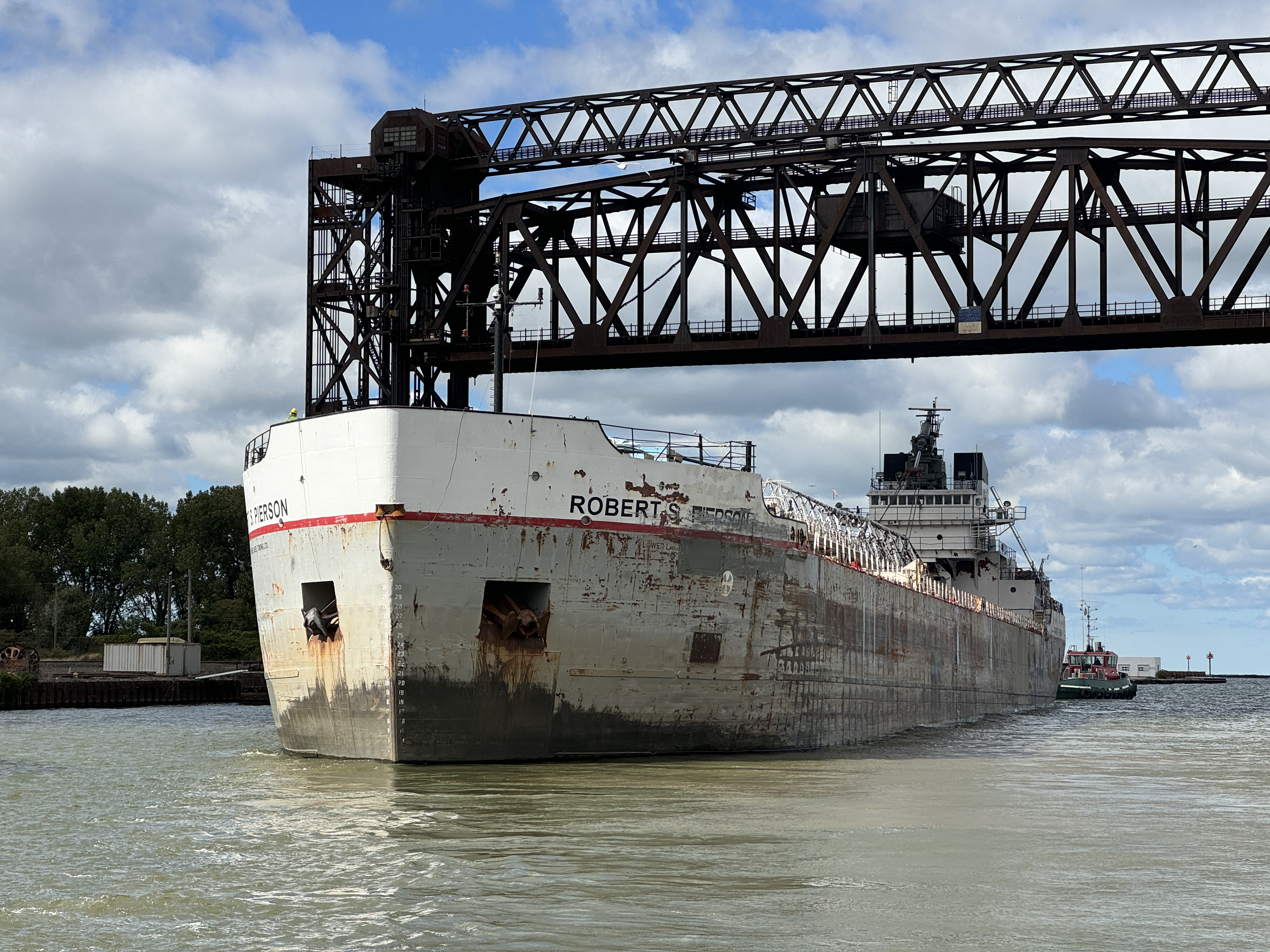
- Robert S. Pierson departing Cleveland with assistance from the tugboat Minnesota in October 2024

History

Canada
- Name: Wolverine (1974–2008); Robert S. Pierson (2008–present)
- Owner: Union Commerce Bank (1974–1994); Oglebay Norton (1994–2006); Wisconsin and Michigan Steamship Co. (2006–2008); Lower Lakes Towing (2008–2026); Algoma Central Corporation (2026–presnt)
- Port of registry: Port Dover, Ontario
- Builder: American Ship Building Company, Lorain, Ohio
- Cost: USD$14.1 million
- Yard number: 903
- Laid down: June 1, 1973
- Launched: September 9, 1973
- Maiden voyage: October 15, 1974
- Identification: IMO number: 7366403; Call sign: CFN4934; MMSI number: 316011905
- Status: In service

General characteristics
- Type: Bulk carrier
- Tonnage: 10,344 GRT; 6,477 NRT; 19,030 DWT
- Length: 630 ft (190 m)
- Beam: 68 ft (21 m)
- Depth: 36 ft 11 in (11.25 m)
- Propulsion: 2 × 2,800 bhp (2,088 kW) ALCO V16 diesel engines; 1 × 1,000 hp (746 kW) bow thruster
- Speed: 11.5 knots (21.3 km/h; 13.2 mph)
- Capacity: 19,600 tons

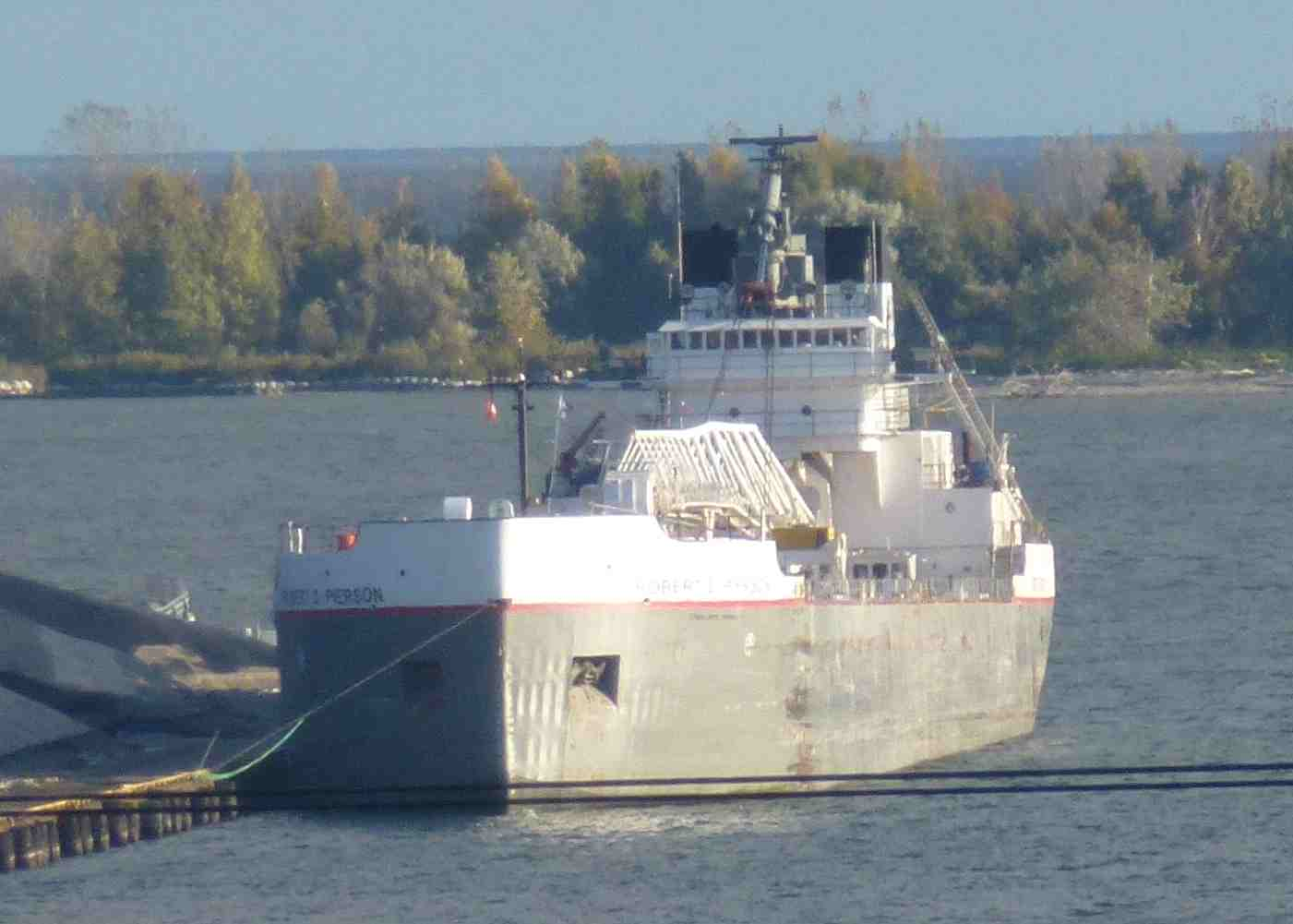
In October 2013 Robert S. Pierson made a rare visit to Toronto

MV Robert S. Pierson is a bulk carrier built for and operated on the North American Great Lakes.

The vessel went through several owners and several names. In 2007, she was sold to Lower Lakes Towing, a Canadian company. Her last namesake was Robert Scott Pierson, the founder of the shipping firm Soo River Company. An earlier vessel named after Pierson operated from 1980 to 1982. When first commissioned in 1974 she was owned by the Union Commerce Bank, of Cleveland, Ohio. She was operated by Oglebay Norton Corporation and named Wolverine. For the next 32 years, she was operated by various divisions of Oglebay Norton.

Oglebay Norton assumed ownership of the vessel in 1994. In 2006, Oglebay Norton sold off its entire fleet to the Wisconsin and Michigan Steamship Company. In 2008, the vessel and two sister ships, David Z. Norton and Earl W. Oglebay were acquired by Grand River Navigation, for $20 million. Grand River then sold Wolverine to its Canadian partner, Lower Lakes Towing of Port Dover, Ontario. It was at this point she was renamed Robert S. Pierson. The Holland Sentinel, commenting on the sale, reported that the change of ownership to Canadian hands would prevent the vessel from visiting Holland, Michigan, formerly a major port of call, "as U.S. cabotage laws limit the ability of foreign-flagged vessels to make deliveries here."

The vessel was not built to seawaymax dimensions, she was specifically designed to navigate "Cleveland's winding Cuyahoga River". She is 630 feet (190 m) long. Her capacity is just under 20,000 tons.

On March 20, 2017, Robert S. Pierson was the first ship upbound in the Welland Canal, and the captain received the Top Hat at the Lock 3 Centre in St Catharines, Ontario.

On February 27, 2026, Robert S. Pierson, along with her fleetmates were acquired by Algoma Central Corporation.
