= Lower Lakes Towing =

Canadian shipping company

Lower Lakes Towing is a Canadian shipping firm, operating on North American Great Lakes.

Its fleet included the Robert S. Pierson, the Cuyahoga, the Kaministqua, the Manitoulin, the Michipicoten, and the Saginaw.

The Cuyahoga was scrapped in 2025 after fires in 2023 and 2024.

Since 2006, the company has been wholly owned by Rand Logistics along with Grand River Navigation Company.

Lower Lakes Towing was acquired by Algoma Central Corporation in March 2026.

The Michipicoten is set to be scrapped as of November 2026
