= Detroit River Light =

Lighthouse in Michigan, United States

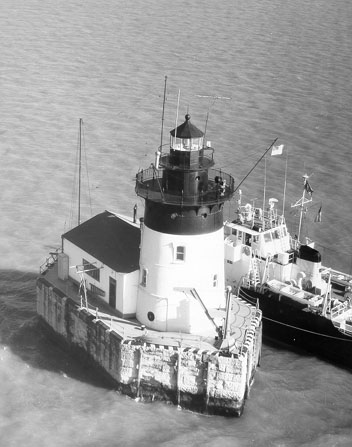
- Undated USCG photo
- Location: Lake Erie south of Detroit River, Monroe County, near Berlin Charter Township
- Coordinates: 42°0′2.7″N 83°8′26.45″W

Tower
- Constructed: 1875 (lightship); 1885 (current tower)
- Foundation: Wood/cement crib, Granite pier
- Construction: Cast iron with brick lining
- Automated: 1979
- Height: 49 feet (15 m)
- Shape: frustum of a cone with attached building
- Markings: White with black top
- Heritage: National Register of Historic Places listed place, Michigan State Historic Site
- Fog signal: Horn: 1 every 30s
- Racon: X

Light
- Focal height: 55 feet (17 m)
- Lens: 4th order Fresnel lens
- Range: 10 nautical miles (19 km; 12 mi)
- Characteristic: Fl(2) W 6s
- Detroit River Light Station
- U.S. National Register of Historic Places
- Michigan State Historic Site
- Nearest city: Rockwood, Michigan
- Area: 0.1 acres (0.040 ha)
- Built: 1884
- Architect: Davis C.E.L.B.
- MPS: U.S. Coast Guard Lighthouses and Light Stations on the Great Lakes TR
- NRHP reference No.: 83000886
- Added to NRHP: August 04, 1983

The Detroit River Light, also known as Bar Point Shoal Light, was first established as a lightship in 1875. The current sparkplug lighthouse was built in 1885. It sits in Lake Erie, south of the mouth of the Detroit River, 1.75 nautical miles (3.24 km; 2.01 mi) from land and about 20 nautical miles (23 mi; 37 km) from the Ambassador Bridge in the Detroit River. It is about 0.4 nautical miles (0.74 km; 0.46 mi) from the border with Canada, and just under 24 nautical miles (44 km; 28 mi) from Put-in-Bay, Ohio. Its original 4th order Fresnel lens is on loan to the Michigan Maritime Museum.

== Construction and infrastructure ==
The Detroit River Light replaced a Canadian lightship that had been posted in this channel location since 1875, guiding upbound vessels making a turn in the Detroit River.

The United States Lighthouse Board completed the Detroit River Light in 1885 at a cost of $78,000. The light was first lit on August 20, 1885.

The crib was transported to the site from Amherstburg, Ontario. It was built pre-fabricated 45 by 18 feet (13.7 by 5.5 m), sunk in 22 feet (6.7 m) of water, filled with concrete and surrounded by a granite pier. The light station pier is shaped like a vessel. Its pointed end is directed toward the mouth of the river to break river-powered ice floes. Above the crib and pier, the 49 feet (15 m) high cast iron boiler plate tower is 22 feet (6.7 m) in diameter at its base and 18 feet (5.5 m) at the top. There is an attached storage building and radio beacon.

=== Challenges in construction ===
Construction was eventful and problematic. When the crib settled, it was uneven, about 16 inches (410 mm) off level. As winter was approaching and work set to stop, 550 short tons of stone were loaded onto the pier, "mostly on the high side." Upon the crews return the following spring, gravity and ice floes had made the granite pier level.

== Operational history ==
Detroit River Light was constructed to be a staffed lighthouse. Coast Guard personnel assigned to the station referred to it as "The Rock." The light is now automated.

With Prohibition the light served as a rendezvous point for rum runners. The nearby city of Windsor was a noted point for the distillation of Canadian whiskey, much of which was exported to the U.S.

== The light today ==
In December 1997 the 635-foot (194 m) freighter MV Buffalo struck the station dead on (a "direct hit") as it sailed down bound for Lake Erie. The station suffered minimal damage to rock and stone foundation. The freighter had its steel bow pushed "in like a tin can" with a 25-foot (7.6 m) gash.

The lens has been changed several times, and this has altered the characteristic signal generated by the light to passing boats and ships. The present lens has six panels of 60 degrees, with three bull's-eye panels each separated from the other by a 60 degree blind panel.

The station contains a fog signal, similar to Harbor Beach Light (also built in 1885). The station is an active aid to navigation, is closed to visitors, and visible only from a boat. A good launch point is the south end of the island of Grosse Ile, Michigan.

It was added to the National Register of Historic Places as Detroit River Light Station on August 4, 1983, reference number 83000886.

The light has been memorialized in sculptures.

== Keepers ==
- Charles Northup (1885–1886 and 1893–1898)
- Richard Oddrey (1887–1890)
- Joseph Crawford (1898–1902)
- Enoch Scribner (1902–1912)
- Horace Watts (1912–1916)
- Walter Marshall (1916–1919)
- Harry K Condway (1919–1921)
- John Sweet (1926–1933)
- William Small (1933–1938)
- Eli Martin (1938–1939)
