= MV Algorail =

1968 Canadian freighter

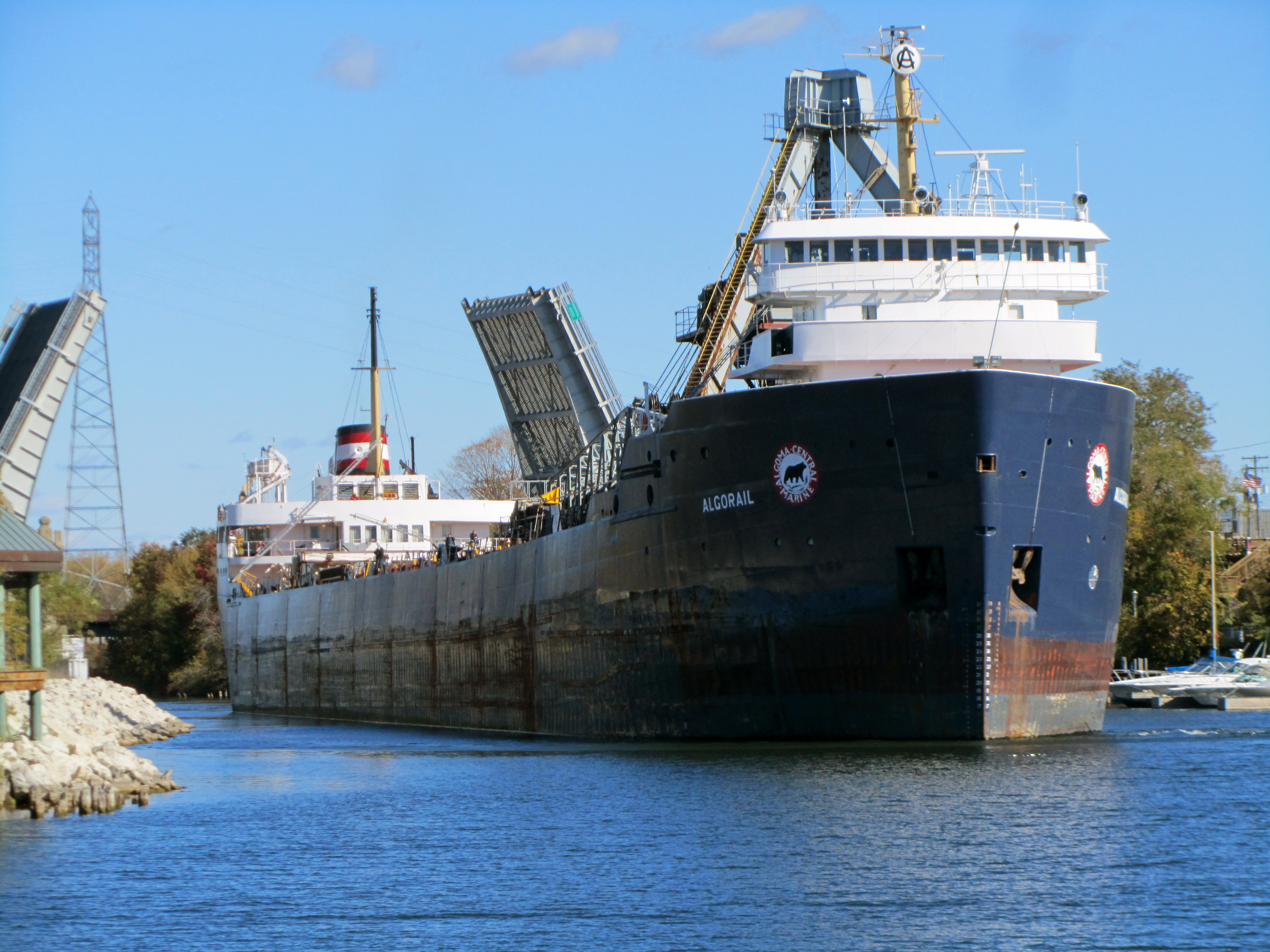
- Algorail traveling under a bridge

History
- Name: Algorail
- Owner: Algoma Central
- Operator: Algoma Central
- Port of registry: Sault Ste. Marie, Ontario, Canada
- Route: Great Lakes
- Builder: Collingwood Shipyards, Collingwood, Ontario
- Yard number: 189
- Launched: 13 December 1967
- Christened: 1 April 1968
- Completed: April 1968
- In service: 1968
- Out of service: 2018
- Identification: IMO number: 6805531; MMSI number: 316001805; Callsign: VYNG
- Fate: Scrapped 2018

General characteristics
- Type: Self-discharging bulk carrier
- Tonnage: 16,157 GT; 23,320 DWT
- Length: 640 ft 5 in (195.2 m); 620 ft 1 in (189 m)
- Beam: 72 ft 3 in (22.0 m)
- Draught: 26 ft 0 in (7.9 m) (Seaway); 29 ft 2 in (8.9 m) (maximum)
- Installed power: 4 × Fairbanks-Morse 10-38D8-1/8 diesel engines; 6,664 hp (4,969 kW) (combined)
- Propulsion: 1 shaft
- Speed: 15 knots (28 km/h; 17 mph)

Algorail was a lake freighter owned and operated by Algoma Central. The ship was built by Collingwood Shipyards in Collingwood, Ontario and was launched in 1967. The ship sailed on the North American Great Lakes and the Saint Lawrence Seaway delivering coal/coke, aggregates, slag, iron ore/oxides, salt, fertilizers, grain products, gypsum, quartzite, or sand. The ship was laid up in 2016 and sold for scrap in 2018.

== Description ==
The ship was 640 ft 5 in (195.2 m) long overall and 620 ft 1 in (189 m) between perpendiculars with a beam of 72 ft 3 in (22.0 m). The ship has a maximum draught of 26 ft 0 in (7.9 m) and a Saint Lawrence Seaway draught of 26 ft 0 in (7.9 m). Algorail had a gross tonnage (GT) of 16,157 and a deadweight tonnage (DWT) of 23,320.

Algorail was powered by four Fairbanks-Morse 10-38D8-1/8 diesel engines driving one shaft. The engines were rated at 6,664 horsepower (4,969 kW) combined. The vessel was also equipped with one 600 hp (447 kW) bow thruster and one 1,000 hp (746 kW) stern thruster. The ship had a maximum speed of 15 knots (28 km/h; 17 mph). The ship had four holds, 17 hatches and is equipped with a 250-foot (76 m) discharge boom that can swing 105 degrees to either side of the ship and discharges 3,810 tonnes per hour.

== Service history ==
The ship was constructed by Collingwood Shipyards at their yard in Collingwood, Ontario with the yard number 189. Algorail was launched on 13 December 1967, christened on 1 April 1968 and completed that month. The second freighter of the name was registered at Sault Ste. Marie, Ontario for Algoma Central. A self-unloading bulk carrier, she is one of the last lake freighters built in the traditional two-superstructure style, with the bridge at the bow. The ship sails on the North American Great Lakes and the Saint Lawrence Seaway delivering coal/coke, aggregates, slag, iron ore/oxides, salt, fertilizers, grain products, gypsum, quartzite, or sand.

On 6 October 1972, Algorail collided with the pier at Holland, Michigan loaded with a cargo of salt. The pier tore a 12-foot (3.7 m) hole in her bow, which caused the vessel to sink. The ship was refloated, repaired and put back into service. On 20 April 1999, Algorail ran aground at Green Bay, Wisconsin in the Fox River. The ship was undamaged, but attempts by two tugboats to free the ship damaged the docks at Green Bay. On 25 June 2013 she ran aground with a shipment of salt in the Saginaw River. Zilwaukee Dock Manager Jim Cnudde cited Algorail's running aground as an indication that greater efforts should be made to keep the river dredged. The ship was freed after unloading some of her cargo into a barge. The ship was laid up at the end of 2016 and did not see service in 2017. In 2018, Algorail was sold to International Marine Salvage for scrap and towed to Port Colborne, Ontario to be broken up.
