= Equinox-class freighter =

Series of bulk carriers

The Equinox class is a series of related bulk carriers operated by Canadian shipping company Algoma Central for service on the Great Lakes. Two variants of the class have been ordered, totaling twelve ships.

== Equinox 740 ==
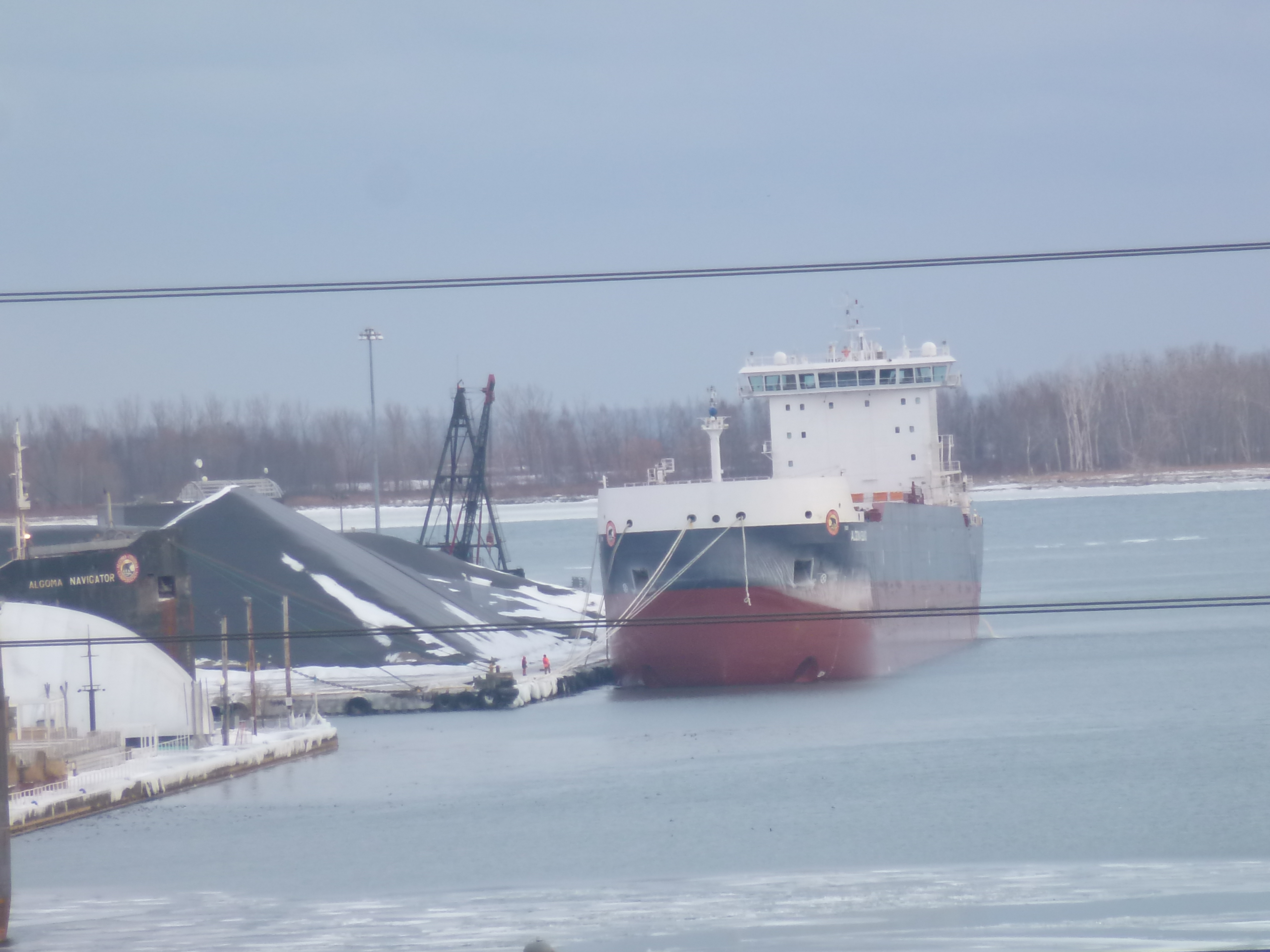
Algoma Equinox, the lead ship of the Equinox class, moored in Toronto

The Equinox 740 is named after their 740-foot (226 m) length, the maximum that clears the dimensions of the locks in the Welland Canal and Saint Lawrence River. Algoma Central began designing the Equinox class in the early 2010s in conjunction with Finnish engineering group Deltamarin. The ships were developed from Deltamarin's B.Delta design, albeit heavily modified according to Algoma Central's requirements. Elements such as a more modern main engine and a newer hull design gave an estimated 45% increase in energy efficiency compared to Algoma Central's then-current fleet, and the first exhaust scrubber system installed on a Great Lakes freighter was installed to allow the ships to burn fuel oil while meeting sulfur dioxide emissions regulations. The ships measure 225.6 metres (740.2 ft) long, with a beam of 23.8 metres (78.1 ft) and a draft of 14.7 metres (48.2 ft). They have a deadweight tonnage of 38,540 and a gross tonnage of 23,895. They have a cargo capacity of 47,952 cubic metres (1,693,409 ft^{3}) in five holds. Shipboard power and propulsion systems are built by Wärtsilä, which supplied a five cylinder RT-flex50 main engine with an output of about 7,000 kW (9,387 hp) for propulsion and three 6L20 engines, with output of about 1,100 kW (1,475 hp) each, driving generators for electrical power.

Algoma Central ordered six of the ships, two gearless vessels that require shore facilities to discharge cargo and four self-unloaders, from the Chinese Nantong Mingde shipyard at a cost of CA$300 million. Two further gearless ships were ordered by the Canadian Wheat Board (CWB), with a plan for Algoma Central to operate them. The lead ship of the class, Algoma Equinox, was delivered in late 2013 and entered service at the beginning of the 2014 shipping season. She was followed later in the year by Algoma Harvester, the second of Algoma Central's gearless ships, and the first Canadian Wheat Board vessel, eventually named G3 Marquis and owned by CWB successor G3, but Nantong Mingde went bankrupt in the middle of the order. When the shipyard shut down, the second CWB ship, CWB Strongfield, was nearly completed and the first of Algoma Central's self-unloaders was under construction. CWB Strongfield was purchased at auction in January 2017 by Algoma Central and renamed Algoma Strongfield before undergoing final fitting out at the Jiangsu Yangzijiang Group shipyard. After several months of work, she was released from the shipyard in April and entered service in June. The incomplete hulk of the self-unloading ship was also purchased at auction by Algoma Central and transferred to Jiangsu Yangzijiang for completion. Named Algoma Conveyor, she was delivered from the shipyard in February 2019 to begin service following her arrival on the Great Lakes in April.

Following Nantong Mingde's bankruptcy, Algoma Central ordered two Equinox 740 self-unloaders from Jiangsu Yangzijiang. The first of the ships, Algoma Niagara, was delivered in September 2017 and entered service several months later after her voyage from China. The second, Algoma Sault, arrived in Canada early in the 2018 shipping season.

In January 2015, Algoma Central ordered three Equinox 740 self-unloaders from Croatian shipbuilder Uljanik, scheduled for delivery in 2018, though the schedule later slipped to late 2018 and early 2019. They are equipped with unloading booms mounted at the bow of the ship, in contrast to the conventional location at the aft end of the cargo holds, which gives operators added flexibility in unloading cargo. The majority of the ship's power systems are identical to the Chinese-built ships, though the main engine, while still an RT-flex50 model, is built by Winterthur Gas & Diesel. In October 2018, Algoma Central canceled the orders at Uljanik, citing severe delays in their construction as the shipyard faced major financial difficulties.

== Equinox 650 ==
Algoma Central ordered two Equinox 650 self-unloaders, named for their 650.9-foot (198.4 m) length, from Uljanik in April 2015. They are identical in most other characteristics to Equinox 740 vessels, particularly the Croatian-built ones with which they share the unloading boom-forward design, although the shorter length gives them a lower cargo capacity, with a deadweight tonnage of 24,900. The first ship in the class, named Algoma Innovator, was delivered in December 2017, though she was not scheduled to depart the shipyard until February 2018 in order to avoid the most severe weather in the North Atlantic on her delivery voyage. She was to be followed later in the year by sister ship Algoma Endurance, though in light of Uljanik's financial situation and delays in construction the order for Algoma Endurance was cancelled in September 2018. The hull of Algoma Endurance remained incomplete at Uljanik's 3. Maj shipyard until September 2019, when construction resumed under the auspices of an independent 3. Maj after Uljanik was liquidated. The ship, renamed Algoma Intrepid, was delivered in September 2020.
