= Michipicoten (1952 ship) =

Self discharging lake freighter

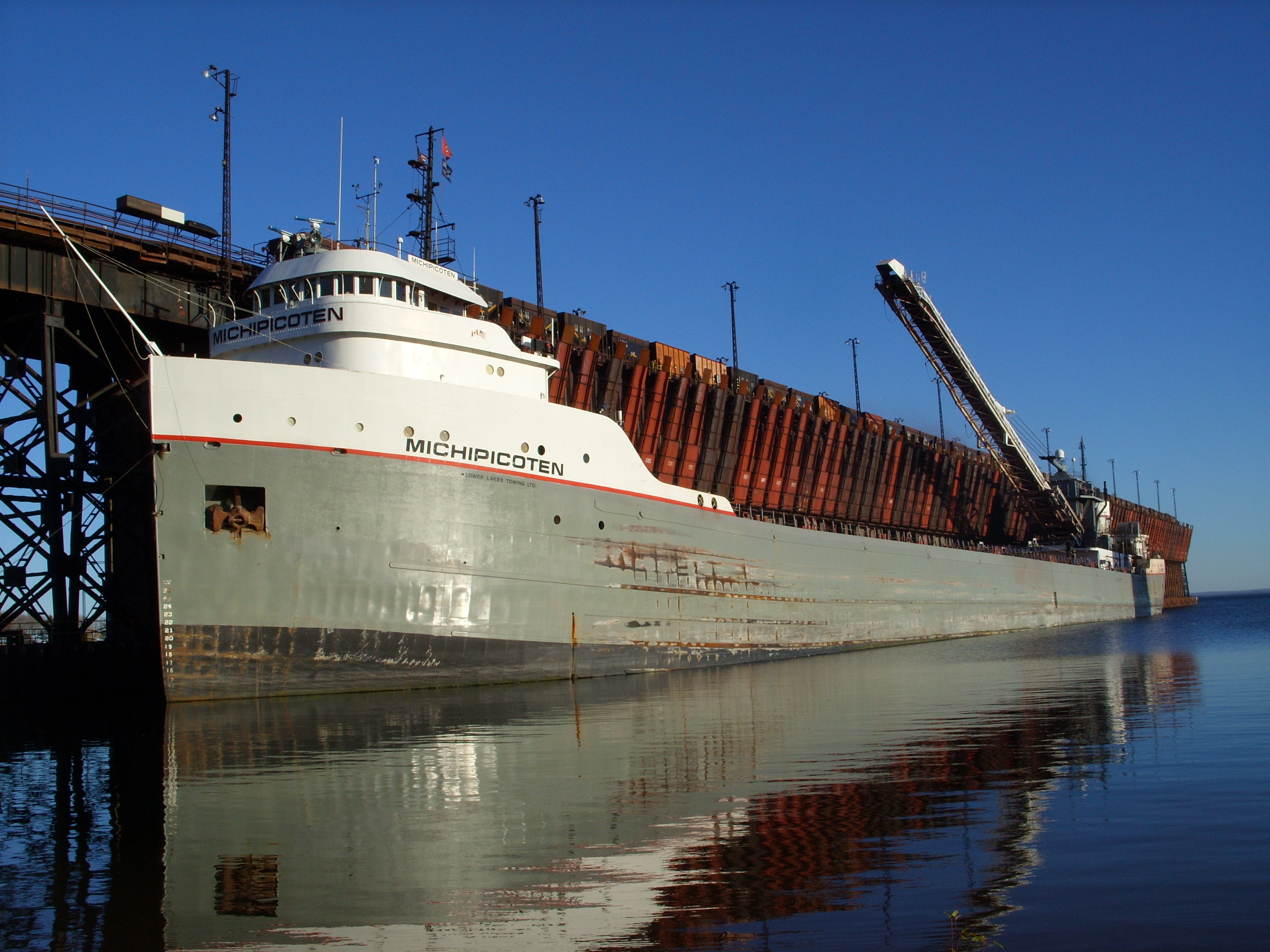
- Michipicoten docked in Marquette, Michigan.

History
- Name: 1952–2003: Elton Hoyt 2nd (Note: This was the registered name; a different ship 1926–1952 was named Elton Hoyt II); from 2003: Michipicoten
- Owner: 1952–1966: Interlake Steamship Co; 1966–2003: Pickands, Mather & Co; 2003-2026: Lower Lakes Towing; from 2026: Algoma Central Corporation
- Operator: 1952–2003: Pickands, Mather & Co; 2003-2026: Lower Lakes Towing
- Launched: March 7, 1952
- Maiden voyage: August 15, 1952
- Out of service: 8 June 2024
- Renamed: May 24, 2003
- Home port: 1952–2003 Wilmington, Delaware; from 2003 Port Dover, Ontario
- Identification: IMO number: 5102865; from 2003: MMSI number: 316002501; from 2003: Call sign CFG8060
- Fate: Sold for scrap

General characteristics
- Tonnage: 15,366 GT
- Length: 208.18 m (683 ft 0 in)
- Beam: 21.34 m (70 ft 0 in)
- Draught: 6.7 m (22 ft 0 in)
- Depth: 11.28 m (37 ft 0 in)
- Propulsion: MaK 6M32C 6-cylinder 8,160 bhp (6,080 kW) diesel engine
- Speed: 12 knots (14 mph)
- Capacity: 23,491 tons
- Notes: above current in 2024

Michipicoten (named Elton Hoyt 2nd when she entered service in 1952) is a self-discharging lake freighter owned and operated by Canadian shipping firm Lower Lakes Towing of Port Dover, Ontario. Michipicoten primarily hauls taconite from Marquette, Michigan, to the Algoma Steel Mill in Sault Ste. Marie, Ontario. She has a capacity of 22,300 tons, a speed of 12 knots (14 mph), and a length of 689 feet 6 inches (210.2 m).

== Construction ==
Michipicoten was built in 1952 by Bethlehem Shipbuilding & Dry Dock Co. in Sparrows Point, Maryland. She was one of three vessels built to similar plans for the Interlake Steamship Company. It was launched as Elton Hoyt 2nd. The other two vessels, Johnstown and Sparrows Point, were also built by the Bethlehem Steel Corporation.

All three ships were brought to the Great Lakes via the Mississippi and Illinois rivers, restricting their size. Specifically, Elton Hoyt 2nd measured 626 feet 6 inches (191.0 m) long, with a capacity of around 20,000 tons. She was powered by a 7,700 shaft horsepower (5,700 kW) Bethlehem Steel cross compound steam turbine and two oil-fired Foster-Wheeler water tube boilers. As Elton Hoyt 2nd was brought through the rivers, her cabins and pilothouse were carried on-deck, assembled in Chicago, and entered service on August 15, 1952.

== Service history ==
Over the course of the next nearly two decades, Elton Hoyt 2nd entered a pattern of shipping iron ore from Duluth, Minnesota, or Superior, Wisconsin, to a number of ports in the lower Great Lakes.

Throughout the 1950s, Elton Hoyt 2nd had an incident-free career. In 1957, she was lengthened by 72 feet (22 m), increasing her total length to 698 feet 6 inches (212.90 m). The lengthening also increased her capacity to around 23,000 tons. In 1966, the Elton Hoyt 2nd was sold to Pickands Mather and Co. She remained in their fleet until 1973.

=== Conversion to a self-unloader ===
Twenty-three years later, in 1980, Elton Hoyt 2nd was again upgraded, this time in a conversion to a self-unloading vessel. She was converted at the Toledo, Ohio-based American Ship Building Company. In 1985, Johnstown, which had not been converted to a self unloader, was sold for scrap. The third ship, Sparrows Point, was converted in 1980 and sailed as Buckeye until 2008, when that ship sustained severe damage to her engines and shortly after was converted again by the Rand Logistics/Lower Lakes Towing company into the barge Menominee, leaving Michipicoten the last fully functional member of her class.

Throughout the 1980s and 1990s, the Elton Hoyt 2nd saw varied use. For some seasons, she did not sail. In the 1990s, the vessel was certified to carry grain, and made several trips to Buffalo, New York, in addition to her regular loads of taconite.

=== Sale ===
On April 10, 2003, it was announced that Elton Hoyt 2nd was sold to Lower Lakes Towing, a Canadian shipping company. She was renamed Michipicoten after the Canadian river of the same name. The name Michipicoten means "Big bluffs" in the Ojibwe language and refers to the hills near the river. She was christened on May 24, 2003, in Sarnia, Ontario. The ship began supplying taconite to the Algoma Steel Mill in Sault Ste. Marie, Ontario.

In December 2010, Michipicoten was laid up in Sarnia. Over the course of several months, her steam turbine system was replaced with a MaK 6M32C 6-cylinder 8,160 brake horsepower (6,080 kW) diesel engine and a new pitch propeller. The cost of the upgrade was around US$15 million.

=== Hull damage ===
On June 8, 2024, the ship suffered hull damage while traveling near Isle Royale in Lake Superior. The ship's crew reported hearing a loud bang while the vessel was in deep water. The ship began taking on water, and at one point reached a 15 degree list. The crew was able to issue a distress call and start pumps that alleviated the list to 5 degrees. The distress call was met by the MV Edwin H. Gott, which waited with Michipicoten until the arrival of the U.S. Coast Guard. Michipicoten sailed for Thunder Bay, Ontario, under her own power with escorts from the U.S. and Canadian Coast Guard.

The Coast Guard later determined that the causes of the crack were:

- Chronic overstressing
- Failure to properly use cargo loading software
- Failure in cargo loading and oversight
- Failure to adhere to company loading procedures
- Failure to establish company maximum bending moment policy
- Failure to trim cargo as required by the International Maritime Solid Bulk Cargo Code requirements

On June 20, 2024, Michipicoten arrived at Superior from Thunder Bay under her own power, escorted by the tugboat Helen H, bound for Fraser Shipyards for inspection and repair. As of August 2025 Transport Canada had not approved for her to return to service after repairs.

In 2026, Michipicoten, along with her fleetmates were acquired by Algoma Central Corporation.

=== Scrapping ===
In November 2026 it was announced that Michipicoten will be towed for scrap, to the Purvis Marine dock in Sault Ste. Marie, Ontario.
