= Algoma Central =

Canadian real estate and shipping corporation

Algoma Central Corporation
- Company type: Public
- Traded as: TSX: ALC
- Industry: Shipping
- Founded: Incorporated on August 11, 1899 in Sault Ste. Marie, Ontario
- Founder: Francis H. Clergue
- Headquarters: St. Catharines, Ontario
- Key people: Gregg Ruhl, President & CEO
- Number of employees: 1,600
- Website: algonet.com

The Algoma Central Corporation is the result of a reorganization of the Algoma Central Railway in 1990. The company claims assets in excess of $400 million and revenue of $280 million. Corporate headquarters is located in St. Catharines, Ontario, Canada.

== Subsidiaries ==
The company operates a number of subsidiaries including:

- Algoma Central Properties - owning commercial real estate in Sault Ste. Marie, St. Catharines, and Waterloo, Ontario
- Algoma Ship Repair - repairs ships at its dock on the Welland Canal in Port Colborne, Ontario
- Algoma Tankers - transportation of petroleum products through the Great Lakes
- Algoma Central Marine - operates bulk shipping on the Great Lakes (see below)
- Formerly Algoma Central Railway

In 1980, the Algoma Central was the original owner (as Algocen Realty Holdings Ltd.) of Algo Centre Mall; Algoma Central Company wrote off over $5 million in property value due to 1990's Elliot Lake mine closures and subsequently sold the property. The mall, renamed in 2005 by a subsequent owner, collapsed in a June 23, 2012, structural failure and has since been demolished.

== Shipping ==
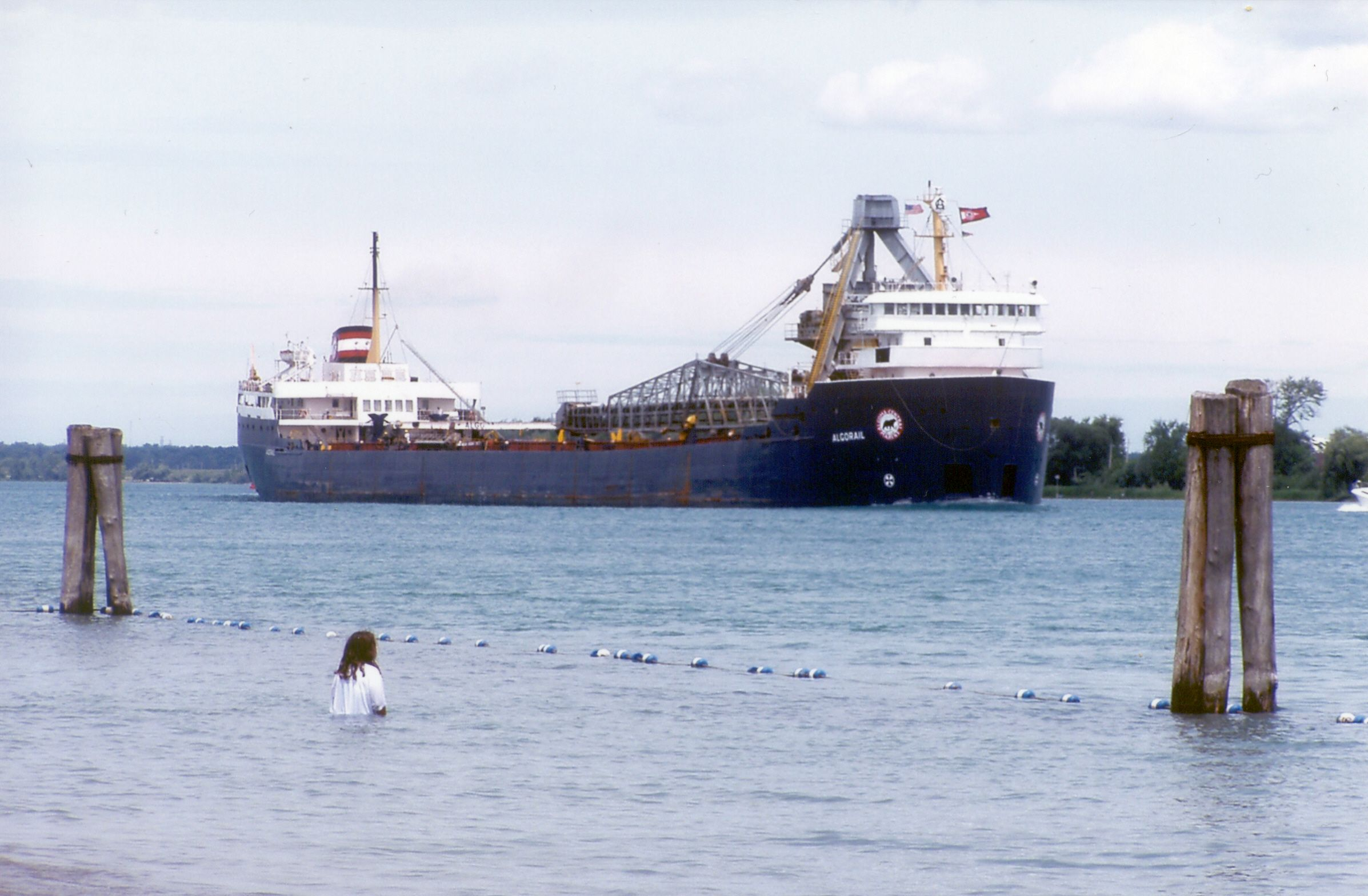
Canadian freighter Algorail downbound in the St. Clair River

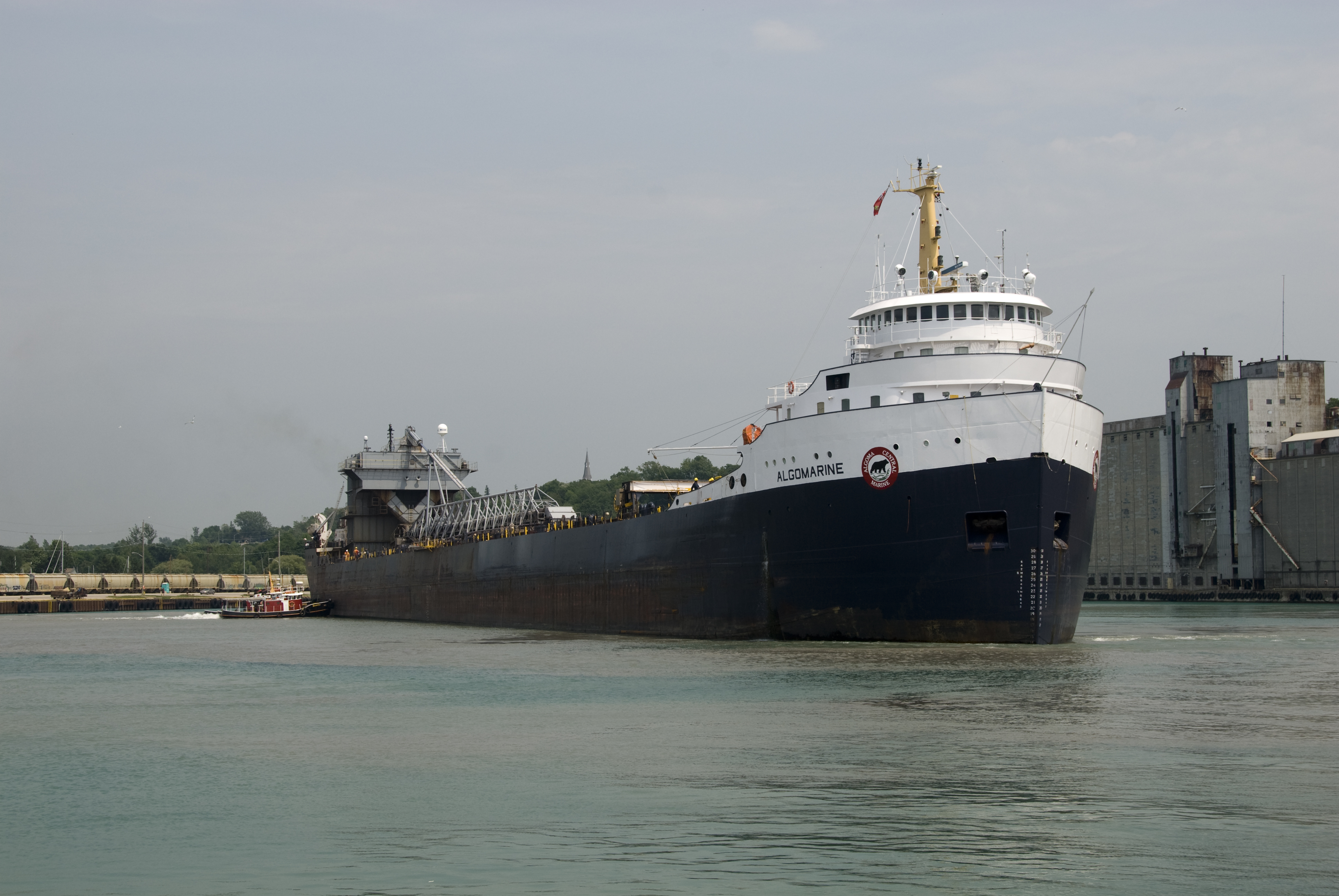
Algomarine at Goderich, Ontario

An Algoma Central Corp. subsidiary, Algoma Central Marine, operates a fleet of self unloaders on the Great Lakes.

In 2000, Upper Lakes Shipping Ltd. and Algoma Central began a partnership to coordinate the transportation of goods along the St. Lawrence Seaway, called Seaway Marine Transport. In 2011 upon the purchase of Upper Lakes Shipping Ltd. and buying out the partnership, the company re-emerged as Algoma Central Marine. Upon completion of the purchase, the entire fleet was then renamed, with the exception of the John D. Leitch, the ship that was named in honour of the company's then owner.

Beginning in 2013, the corporation initiated construction of a series of new bulk carriers to be named after the lead ship, Algoma Equinox. The redesigned fleet incorporated engineering and technology improvements to reduce fuel consumption, create a safer workplace, and reduce emissions and other environmental impact. The company installed Buffalo Automation's "AutoMate" system of sensors, cameras, and software on select Equinox series vessels, to evaluate autonomous navigation.

Algoma Central's self-unloading bulk carriers
Name	Launched	Image
Algoma Bear	2024	
Algoma Buffalo	1978	
Algoma Compass	1973	
Algoma Conveyor	2019	
Algoma Endeavour	2024	
Algoma Innovator	2018	
Algoma Intrepid	2020	
Algoma Mariner	2011	
Algoma Niagara	2017	
Algoma Sault	2018	
John D. Leitch	1967	
Michipicoten	1952	
Radcliffe R. Latimer	1978	
Robert S. Pierson	1973	
Saginaw	1953	
Valo	1953	

Algoma also operates several gearless bulk carriers:

Algoma Central's gearless bulk carriers:
Name	Launched	Image
Algoma Discovery	1987	
Algoma Equinox	2013	
Algoma Guardian	1987	
Algoma Harvester	2014	
Algoma Strongfield	2016	
Captain Henry Jackman	2021	
G3 Marquis	2014	
Kaministiqua	1983	
Tim S. Dool	1967	

Algoma operates a fleet of tankers:

Algoma Central's tankers
Name	Launched	Image
Algoberta	2007 (acquired 2022)	
AlgoCanada	2009	
Algoluna	2010 (acquired 2022)	
Algonova	2008	
Algoscotia	2004	
Algoterra	2010	
Algotitan	2007 (acquired 2022)	
