= Seawaymax =

Largest ships that can pass through the St. Lawrence Seaway

General characteristics
- Tonnage: 28,500 DWT
- Length: 740 ft (225.6 m)
- Beam: 78 ft (23.8 m)
- Height: 116.5 ft (35.5 m)
- Draft: 26.51 ft (8.1 m)

Comparison of bounding box of Seawaymax with some other ship sizes in isometric view.

A Seawaymax vessel is one of the maximum size that can fit through the canal locks of the St. Lawrence Seaway, linking the inland Great Lakes of North America with the Atlantic Ocean.

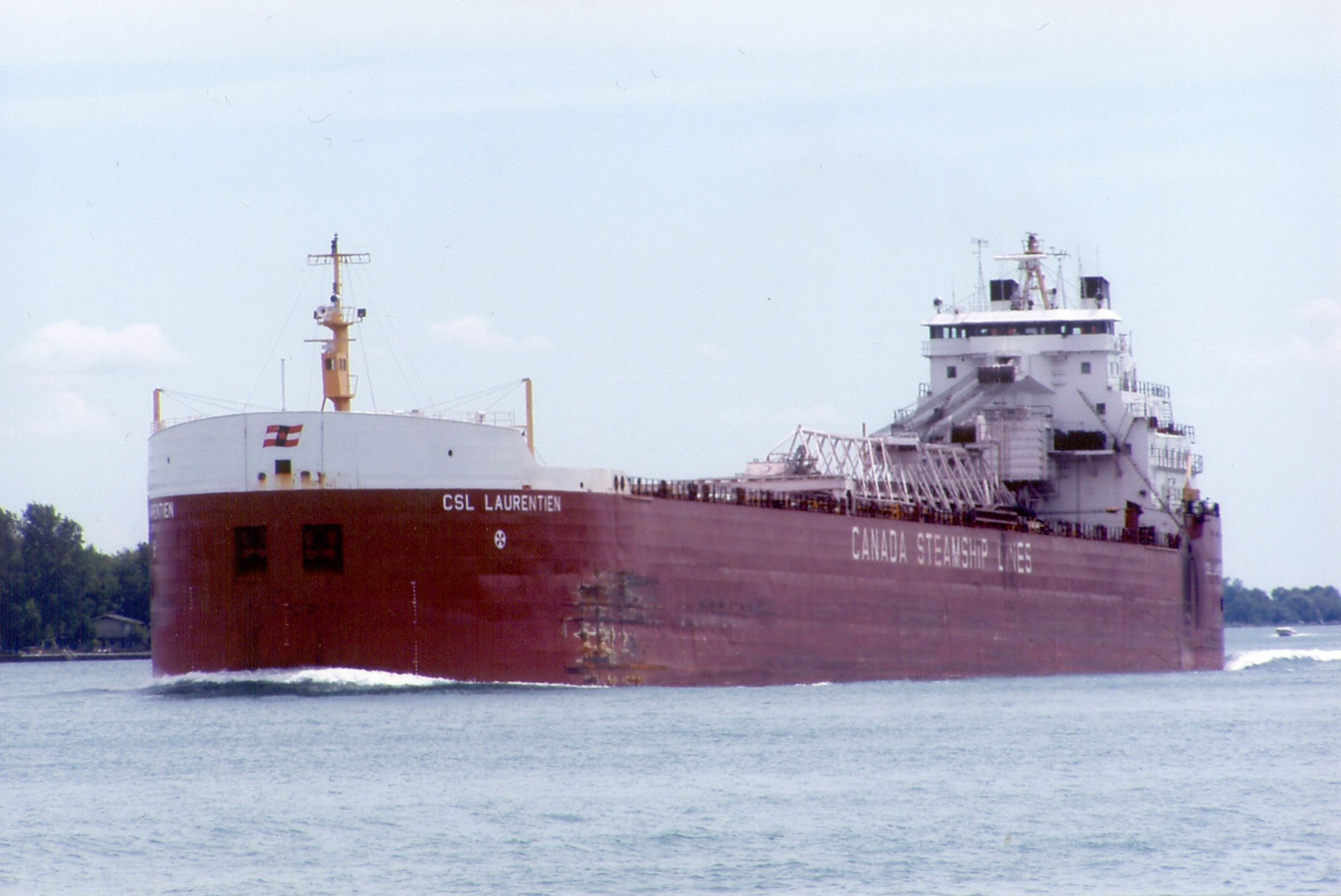
CSL Laurentien, a Seawaymax-sized vessel

Seawaymax vessels are 225.55 metres (740.0 ft) in length, 23.80 metres (78.1 ft) wide, and have a draft of 8.08 metres (26.5 ft) and a height above the waterline of 35.5 metres (116.5 ft). A number of lake freighters larger than this size cruise the upper Great Lakes and cannot pass through to the Atlantic Ocean. The size of the locks limits the size of the ships which can pass and so limits the size of the cargoes they can carry. The record tonnage for one vessel on the Seaway is 28,502 tons of iron ore while the record through the larger locks of the Great Lakes Waterway is 72,351 tons. Most new lake vessels, however, are constructed to the Seawaymax limit to enhance versatility by allowing the possibility of off-Lakes use.

== See also ==
- Canso Canal, a Seawaymax passage in Nova Scotia
- SS Edmund Fitzgerald, the first ship constructed close to Seawaymax size
- Cargo ship#Size categories
