= John Boland =

John Boland may refer to:

- John E. Boland (1937–2015), American politician
- John J. Boland (1875–1956), co-founder of the American Steamship Company
  - John J. Boland (1953 ship), third freighter operated by the American Steamship Company to be named after its co-founder
  - John J. Boland (1973 ship), fourth freighter operated by the American Steamship Company to be named after its co-founder
- John Boland (Fine Gael politician) (1944–2000), Irish Fine Gael politician
- John Boland (author) (1913–1976), British novelist
- John Boland (Irish nationalist politician) (1870–1958), Member of Parliament and Olympic tennis champion
- John P. Boland (priest) (1888–1968), American labor priest in Buffalo, New York
- J. Kevin Boland (born 1935), Roman Catholic bishop, Diocese of Savannah, Georgia
- John Boland (chemist), Irish chemist
- John Boland (South Dakota politician) (1884–1958), American politician, businessman, and early supporter of Mount Rushmore
