= Boland and Cornelius Company =

Former New York Shipping Company

- Company type: Private
- Industry: Shipping
- Founded: 1904 in Buffalo, New York, United States
- Key people: Messrs Boland; Adam E. Cornelius; John J. Boland
- Subsidiaries: American Steamship Company

Boland and Cornelius Company was a shipping company founded in 1904 by Messrs Boland and Adam E. Cornelius in Buffalo, New York. Adam Edwards Cornelius came up with the idea of having self-unloading ships to save time and money. Adam Edwards Cornelius self-unloading ships changed the way ships were unloading. In 1907 Boland and Cornelius founded the American Steamship Company a subsidiary of Boland and Cornelius Company. American Steamship Company later became the current GATX Corporation. Boland and Cornelius Company flew a white and red flag with B&C in blue.

In 1973, the Boland and Cornelius families sold Boland and Cornelius Company and American Steamship Company to the General American Transportation Corporation (GATX). GATX sold the shipping company to RAND Logistics Inc. in 2020. RAND Logistics Inc. was founded in 2006 and has purchased other shipping companies.

Messrs Boland first shipping company was on the Great Lakes with his brothers. Messrs Boland, John J. Boland and Joseph Boland founded the J.J. Boland Company, also J.J. Boland Jr. Company in 1895 in Buffalo, New York. In 1901 Joseph Boland departed the shipping company.

== Self-unloading ships ==
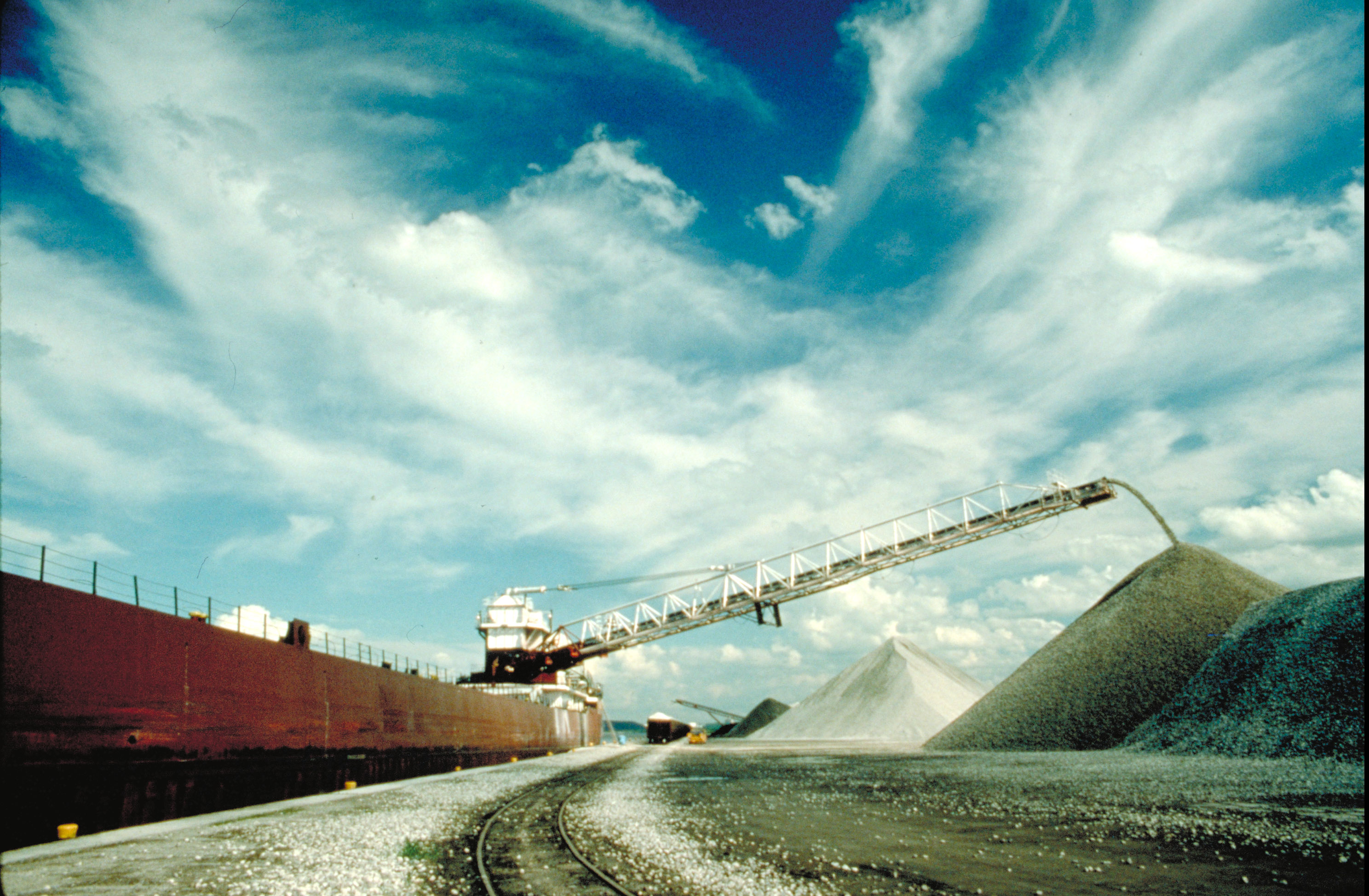
Self-unloading Lake freighter unloading limestone

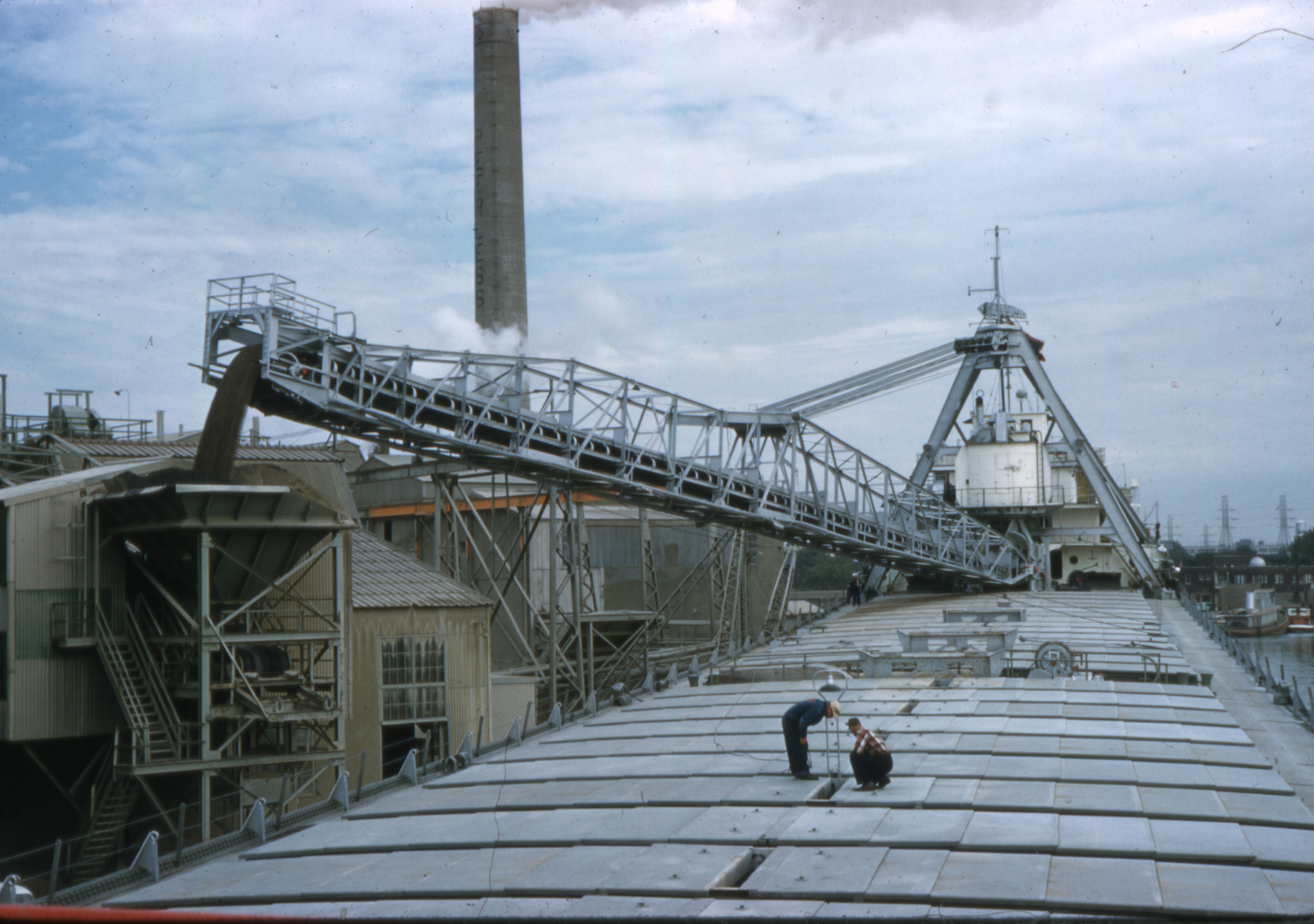
SS Carl D. Bradley unloading hopper in 1958

Adam Edwards Cornelius bulk-carrier self-unloading ships used a Conveyor belt arm to unload cargo. The American Shipbuilding Company was the first to build these new ships.

== World War II ==
In 1941 Boland and Cornelius Company operated as an agent for the American Steamship Company. Boland and Cornelius Company operated a fleet of ships that were used to help the World War II effort. During World War II Boland and Cornelius Company operated Merchant navy ships for the United States Shipping Board. During World War II was active with charter shipping with the Maritime Commission and War Shipping Administration. Boland and Cornelius Company operated Liberty ships and tankers for the merchant navy. The ship was run by its Boland and Cornelius Company crew and the US Navy supplied United States Navy Armed Guards to man the deck guns and radio.

== Ships ==
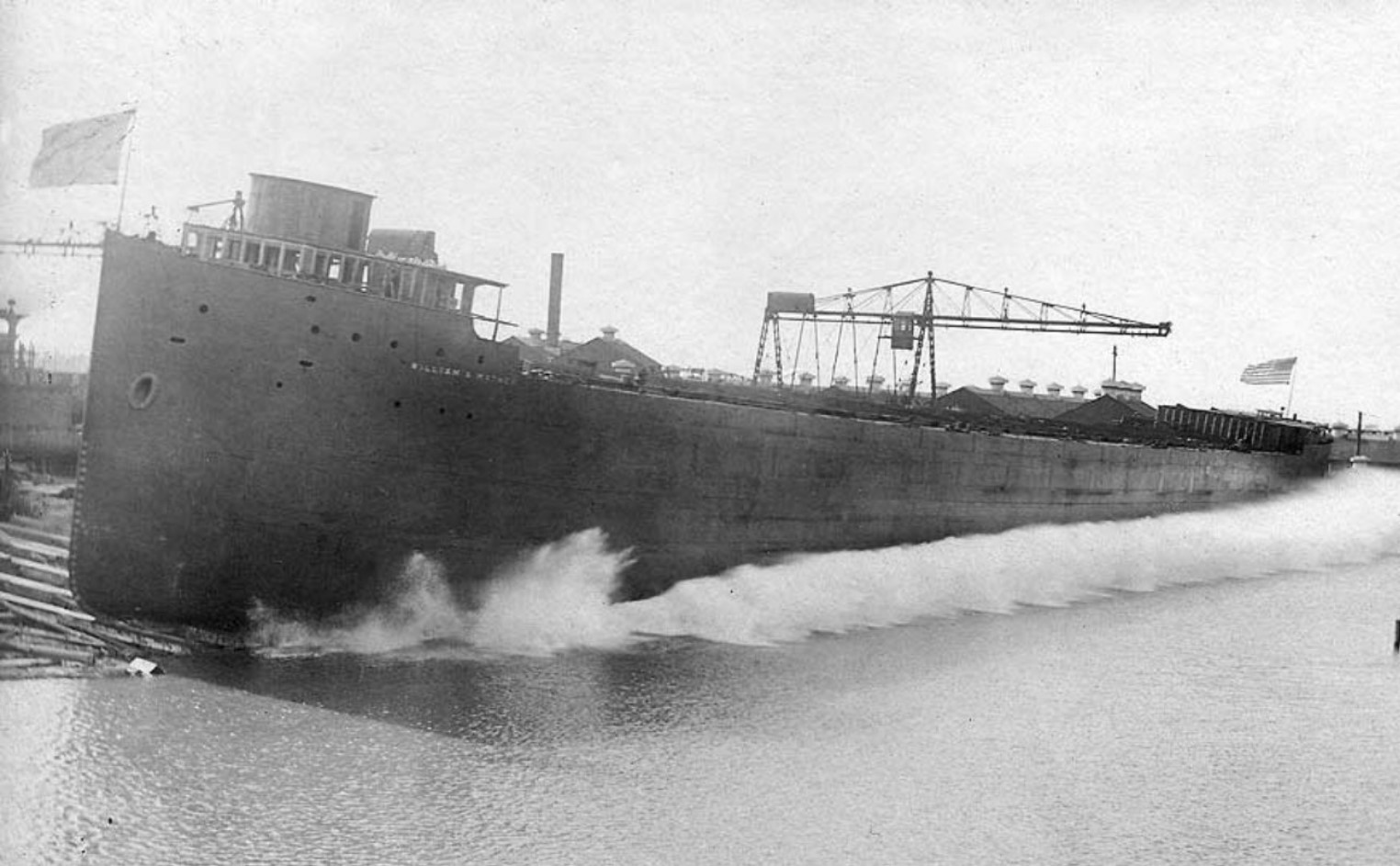
The launch of the SS William G. Mather

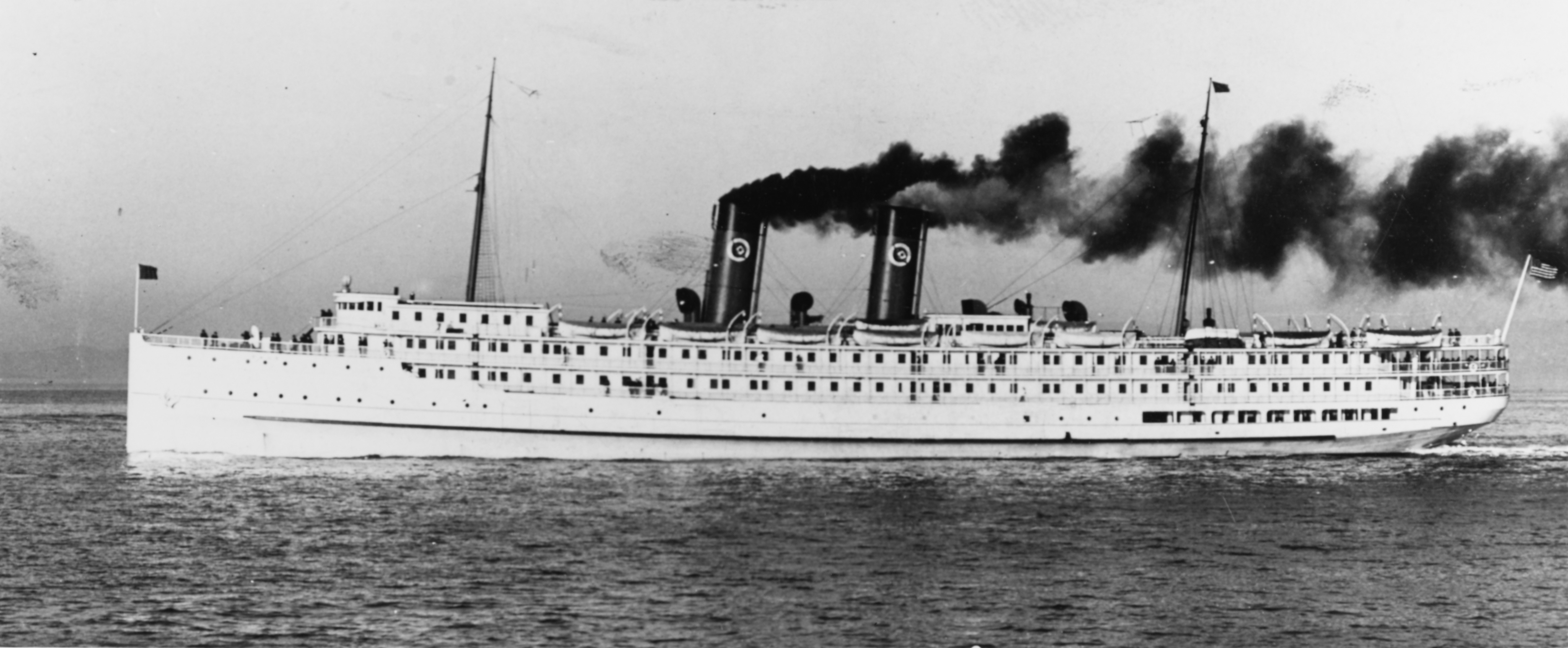
Boland and Cornelius first ship, the SS Yale, shown underway prior to World War I, served as USS Yale (ID-1672), 1918–1920 and as USS Greyhound (IX-106), 1943–1944.

- SS Yale first steel ship
- Adam E. Cornelius (1) (1908)
- SS William G. Mather built in 1905
- Adam E. Cornelius (2)
- Adam E. Cornelius (3), self-unloading ships, built in 1959
- Hugh Kenndey 1907 laker
- MV John J. Boland built in 1973
- MV Saginaw Built in 1953

J.J. Boland Company ships:

- SV Alta a 1905 Schooner 1884-1905
- J.J. Boland Jr, sank

Liberty ships operated:

- James F. Harrell
- Alexander Lillington
- SS Harold T. Andrews
- La Salle Seam
- Darel M. Ritter
- Mary Wilkins Freeman
- Francis A. Retka
- Thomas H. Gallaudet
- Pocahontas Seam
- Jellico Seam

== See also ==
- World War II United States Merchant Navy
