= SS William G. Mather =

Two merchant ships have been named SS William G. Mather.

- SS William G. Mather (1905), a lake freighter 1905–1996; renamed in 1925.
- SS William G. Mather (1925), a lake freighter 1925–1980; currently a museum ship in Cleveland, Ohio.
