= SS Edward L. Ryerson =

American Great Lakes freighter since 1960

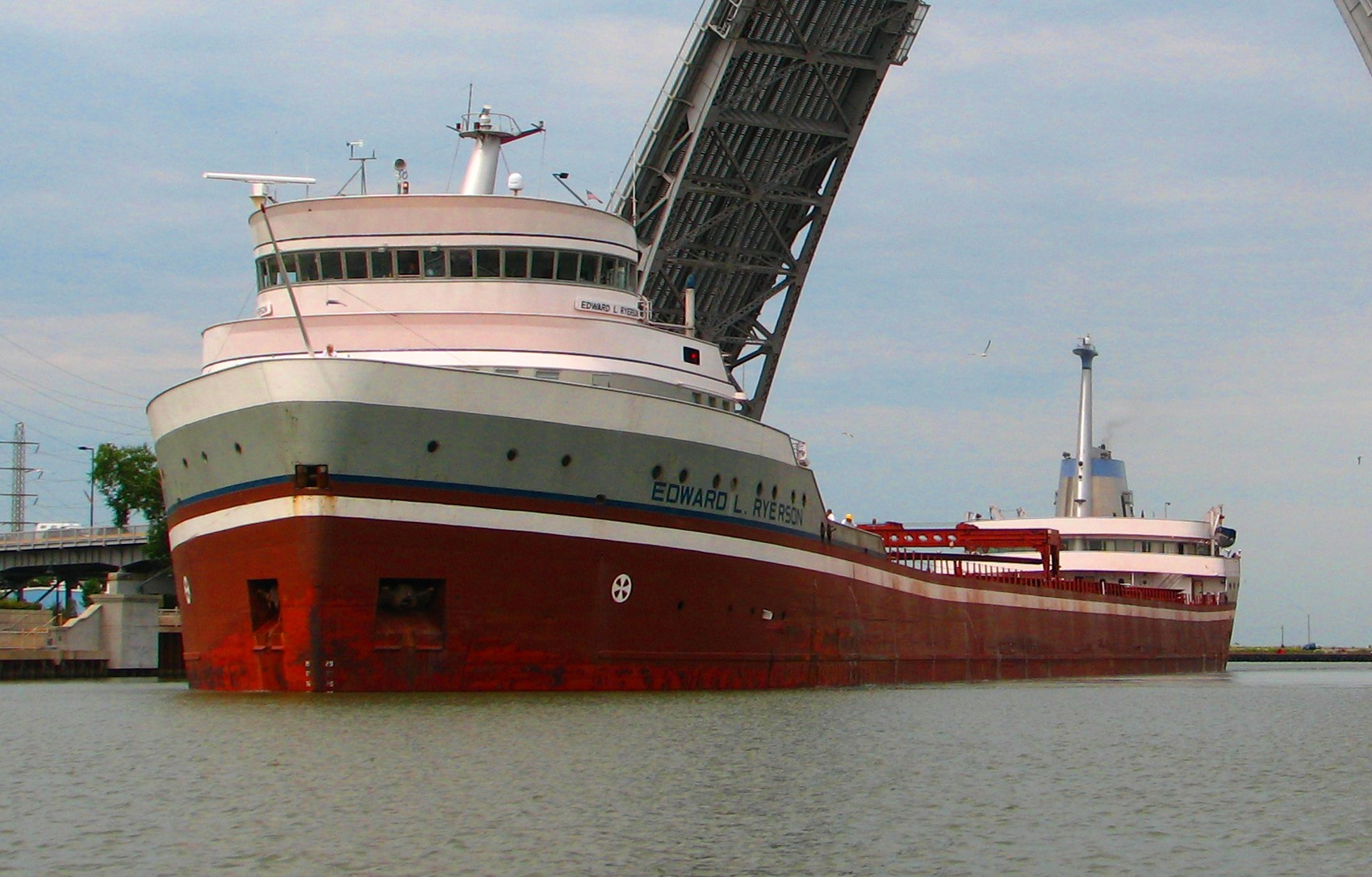
- Edward L. Ryerson in Lorain, Ohio, in 2007

History

United States
- Name: Edward L. Ryerson
- Namesake: Edward Larned Ryerson
- Owner: Central Marine Logistics, Griffith, Indiana
- Port of registry: Indiana Harbor, Indiana
- Builder: Manitowoc Shipbuilding Company, Manitowoc, Wisconsin
- Yard number: 425
- Laid down: April 20, 1959
- Launched: January 21, 1960
- Maiden voyage: August 4, 1960
- Out of service: 2009
- Identification: US official number 282106; IMO number: 5097606; MMSI number: 367126970; Call sign: WM5464
- Nickname(s): Fast Eddie
- Status: Laid up in Superior, Wisconsin. Located at 46.73822°N 92.10375°W

General characteristics
- Type: Lake freighter
- Tonnage: 12,170 GRT; 7,637 NRT
- Displacement: 9,050 long tons (9,195 t) (lightweight)
- Length: 730 ft (220 m) overall; 712 ft (217 m) between perpendiculars
- Beam: 75 ft (23 m)
- Draft: 26.6 ft (8.1 m)
- Depth: 39 ft (12 m)
- Installed power: Engine: 1 × Oil fired General Electric cross-compound steam turbine at 9,900 shp (7,400 kW); Boilers: 2 × 465 pounds per square inch (3,210 kPa) Combustion Engineering boilers; Carried 139,128 U.S. gal (526,660 L; 115,848 imp gal) fuel oil
- Propulsion: Single five bladed fixed pitch 20 ft (6.1 m) propeller
- Speed: 19 mph (31 km/h)
- Capacity: 26,574 long tons (29,763 short tons; 27,000 t)

SS Edward L. Ryerson is a steel-hulled American Great Lakes freighter that entered service in 1960. Built between April 1959 and January 1960 for the Inland Steel Company, she was the third of the thirteen so-called 730-class of lake freighters, each of which shared the unofficial title of "Queen of the Lakes", as a result of their record-breaking length. She was not only the last steam-powered freighter built on the lakes but also the last one that was not a self-unloader. She is one of only two American-owned straight deck lake freighters, the other being John Sherwin, built in 1958. (Note: In this context, "straight deck" indicates that Edward L. Ryerson is unequipped with a self unloading boom.)

Built to transport iron ore almost exclusively, Edward L. Ryerson completed her sea trials on August 3, 1960. She then travelled to Escanaba, Michigan, where she loaded a cargo of iron ore, embarking on her maiden voyage for Indiana Harbor, Indiana, on August 4. She set a Great Lakes iron ore cargo haulage record that stood for three years on August 28, 1962, after loading 24,623 long tons (27,578 short tons; 25,018 t) of iron ore in Superior, Wisconsin. Due to her top speed of 19 mph (31 km/h), she received the nickname of "Fast Eddie". Enthusiasts consider Edward L. Ryerson to be one of the most aesthetically pleasing lake freighters ever built; she quickly became one of the most popular boats on the lakes, to the point that there were rumors that at the Soo Locks, she would regularly be directed through the lock closest to the shore, the MacArthur Lock, for the benefit of boat watchers.

As a result of a downturn in the steel industry, Edward L. Ryerson was laid up in Indiana Harbor for the 1986 and 1987 shipping seasons, returning to service in 1988. She was laid up for a second time in January 1994 in Sturgeon Bay, Wisconsin, where she remained inactive until April 1997. In 1998, Inland Steel was acquired by the Netherlands-based Ispat International N.V. The same year, she was sold to the Indiana Harbor Steamship Company, entering long-term layup at the Bay Shipbuilding Company in Sturgeon Bay in December. Edward L. Ryerson briefly returned to the lakes in 2006, before entering long-term layup at the Fraser Shipyard in Superior, in 2009.

== History ==
=== Design and construction ===
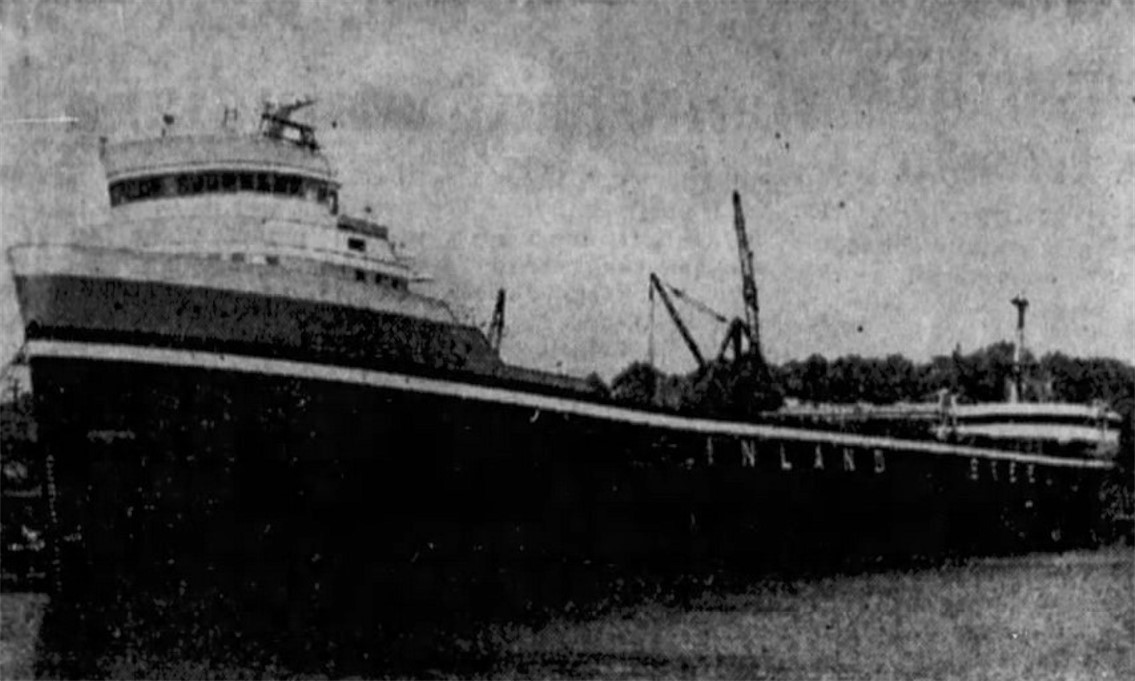
Edward L. Ryerson being fitted out

In 1959, the Inland Steel Company of Chicago contracted H. C. Downer & Associates Incorporated of Cleveland to design a ship to be constructed by the Manitowoc Shipbuilding Company in Manitowoc, Wisconsin. This vessel was one of the first lakers built to the maximum length allowed for passage through the St. Lawrence Seaway, which was completed in the same year as the vessel. Her hull has an overall length of 730 feet (222.5 m) and a length between perpendiculars of 712 feet (217.0 m). She has a 75 foot (23 m) beam and a draft of 26.6 feet (8.1 m). The depth of her hull is 39 ft (12 m). She has a gross register tonnage of 12,170 tons and a net register tonnage of 7,637 tons.

The first keel plate was laid on April 20, 1959. Edward L. Ryerson was the third of the thirteen so-called 730-class of lake freighters built; five were American, of which she is the first. With a cargo capacity of 26,574 long tons (29,763 short tons; 27,000 t), and a 730-foot (220 m) hull, Edward L. Ryerson was one of the longest ships on the Great Lakes at the time of her construction. This earned her the unofficial title of Queen of the Lakes, which she shared with the other ships in her class until December 7, 1962, when the 730.2-foot (222.6 m) Frankcliffe Hall was launched. Edward L. Ryerson's four unique vertical-sided cargo holds were loaded through 18 watertight hatches, each 20 by 54 feet (6.1 by 16.5 m). The vertical sides of the cargo holds were designed to speed up the loading and unloading process and reduce the damage caused by Hulett unloaders, and the large hatches gave the operators better visibility and access to the cargo. Each hatch admitted two chutes to ease the loading of ore. She was the first vessel on the Great Lakes to be equipped with aluminium hatch covers.

She is equipped with a 9,900 shp (7,400 kW) General Electric cross-compound steam turbine, consisting of a high pressure turbine and a low pressure turbine, which is powered by two 465 pounds per square inch (3,210 kPa) oil-burning Combustion Engineering boilers. Her boilers featured the first hydraulic combustion controls installed on an American vessel. She can carry 139,128 U.S. gal (526,660 L; 115,848 imp gal) of fuel oil. Propelled by a single five-bladed fixed pitch 20 ft (6.1 m) propeller—the largest propeller used on a lake freighter in 1960—she had a top speed of 19 mph (31 km/h). In 1969, the installation of a diesel-powered bow thruster improved Edward L. Ryerson's maneuverability.

Edward L. Ryerson's owners intended her to be as aesthetically attractive and luxurious as possible, spending a total of $8 million (equivalent to $67.5 million in 2025) on her. Her accommodations, which were the first of any ship on the Great Lakes to be fully air conditioned, can accommodate up to 37 crewmen and eight guests. Boatnerd writer George Wharton described her as "the most aesthetically pleasing of all lake boats". Edward L. Ryerson was equipped with a magnetic stainless steel map of the Great Lakes for the benefit of passengers, many of whom included members of Inland Steel's management and guests from other companies. In her basic design and construction, Edward L. Ryerson was considered to be a larger version of Inland Steel's 1949 freighter Wilfred Sykes. She is the last steam-powered American freighter built on the lakes, and also the last one built without a self-unloading boom. She was the last American freighter built on the lakes until Stewart J. Cort in 1972, and the last lake freighter constructed in Manitowoc.

=== Name and launch ===
Edward L. Ryerson was named after Inland Steel's chairman of the board, Edward Larned Ryerson. He was the president of the steel service center, Joseph T. Ryerson & Son, until 1935, when the company merged with Inland Steel. From 1940 until his retirement in 1953, Ryerson remained the chairman of the board of both companies. The christening and launch ceremony of Edward L. Ryerson took place at 11:58 a.m. on January 21, 1960. Sponsored by Mrs. Edward L. Ryerson, the new vessel was launched sideways on wooden rollers into the ice-filled Manitowoc River, in front of approximately 5,000 people. The waves caused by Edward L. Ryerson sent large pieces of ice flying into the dock across the river, causing serious damage. She was set to leave the shipyard through the Manitowoc River on July 28, 1960, but there were several areas of the river that she could not transit as a result of her size. Dredging was necessary at these sections, and at one point, part of the shoreline had to be dug away. The work lasted for four hours. An article published in The Herald Times Reporter described moving Edward L. Ryerson "like building a cruiser in the basement and then engineering it through a door too small for its shortest dimension". Edward L. Ryerson completed her sea trials on August 3.

=== Career and layup ===
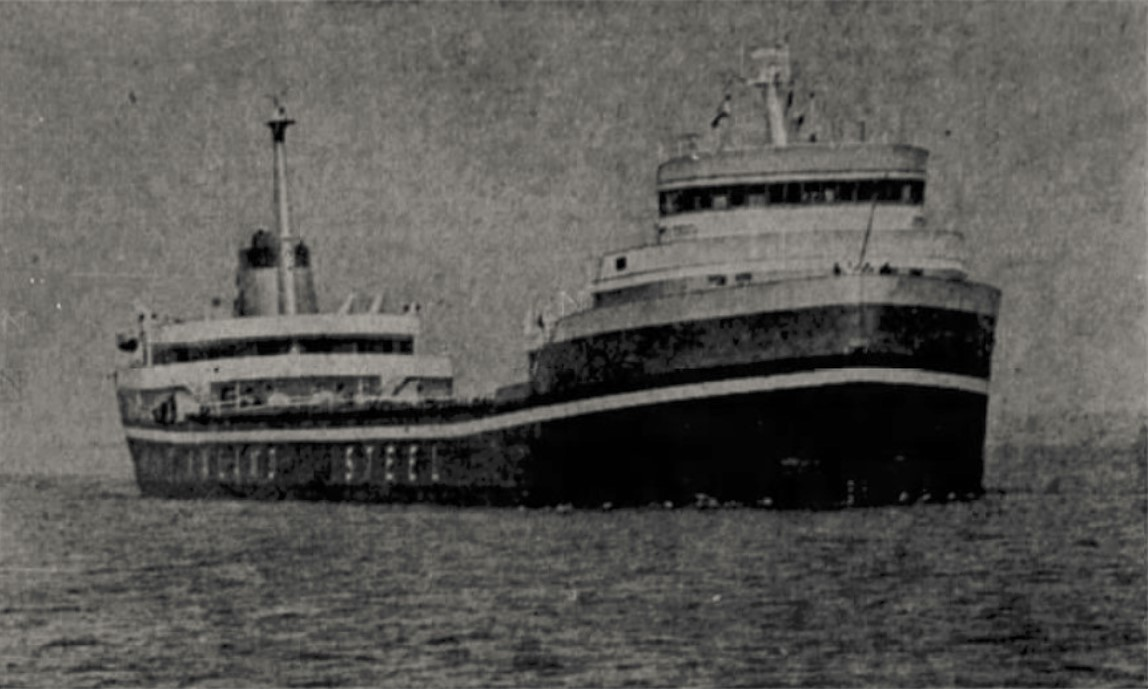
Edward L. Ryerson on her first record setting trip

Edward L. Ryerson was designed almost exclusively for the iron ore trade. After completing her sea trials, she departed Manitowoc in ballast shortly after midnight on August 4, for Escanaba, Michigan. Upon arriving at Escanaba, she loaded 22,846 long tons (25,588 short tons; 23,213 t) of iron ore bound for Indiana Harbor, Indiana, where she arrived on August 6. Edward L. Ryerson set Great Lakes iron ore cargo haulage records twice during the early 1960s. Both times, she loaded iron ore in Superior, Wisconsin, and headed for Indiana Harbor, Indiana. She set the first record in 1960, when she loaded 23,009 long tons (25,770 short tons; 23,378 t) of ore. While underway, she broke a stud of her stuffing box. She set her second record on August 28, 1962, when she loaded 24,623 long tons (27,578 short tons; 25,018 t) of ore at the Great Northern Railway's Allouez ore docks. Her second record would be broken in 1965. Due to her top speed, she received the nickname "Fast Eddie". Edward L. Ryerson quickly became a favourite among boat watchers on the lakes and there were rumors she was regularly directed through the lock closest to the shore, the MacArthur Lock, for their benefit. On board, a stainless steel map of the Great Lakes, with a magnetic representation of Edward L. Ryerson, was installed to keep the guests informed about her location. In 1976, Joseph L. Block superseded Edward L. Ryerson as Inland Steel's largest vessel.

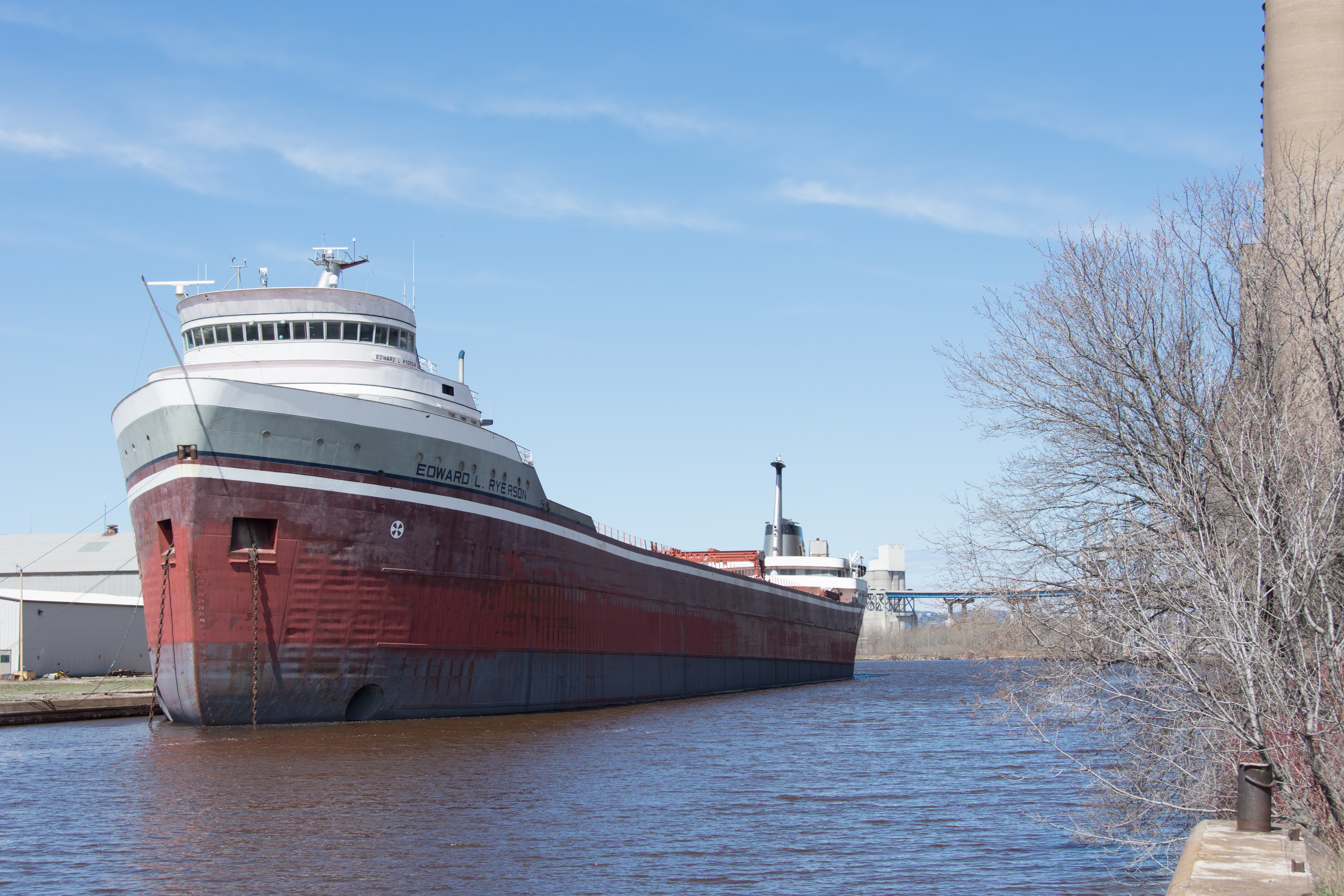
Edward L. Ryerson laid up in the Tower Slip

As a result of a downturn in the steel industry, Edward L. Ryerson was laid up in Indiana Harbor from the end of 1985 to the beginning of 1988, when she returned to service. On July 18, 1992, Edward L. Ryerson loaded the first ever cargo of iron ore pellets to leave Escanaba. She once again entered layup on January 24, 1994, in Sturgeon Bay, Wisconsin, remaining inactive until 1996, returning to service on April 5, 1997.

In 1998, the Netherlands-based Ispat International N.V. acquired Inland Steel, at which time Edward L. Ryerson's official name was changed to Str. Edward L. Ryerson. She was sold to the Indiana Harbor Steamship Company, which was managed by Central Marine Logistics of Griffith, Indiana, later in 1998, entering long-term layup at the Bay Shipbuilding Company in Sturgeon Bay on December 12. Throughout the 1998 shipping season, Edward L. Ryerson carried 1,476,310 long tons (1,653,467 short tons; 1,500,000 t) of iron ore from Escanaba over the course of 55 visits. As part of her layup, she was moved to Sturgeon Bay's east dock on December 7, 2000, and back to Bay Shipbuilding on August 17, 2004.

Edward L. Ryerson re-entered service on June 3, 2006, departing Sturgeon Bay for Escanaba on July 22, 2006, where she loaded 25,227 long tons (28,254 short tons; 25,632 t) of iron ore bound for Indiana Harbor. While travelling downbound for Quebec City, Quebec, she made her inaugural voyage through the Welland Canal on May 24, 2007, transiting the St. Lawrence Seaway for the first time a few days later. On the return leg of a subsequent voyage from Superior, to Quebec City, Edward L. Ryerson loaded a cargo of coal at Valleyfield, Quebec, destined for a port on lower Lake Michigan, thereby becoming the first American–registered vessel to transit every major body of water in the Great Lakes.

She entered layup in 2009, at the Fraser Shipyard in Superior, Wisconsin. In 2013, she was moved to the Tower Slip, near Barko Hydraulics due to soil testing at the Fraser Shipyards. She was moved into the Cumming Slip in 2019, by reason of soil testing at the Tower Slip. Edward L. Ryerson is one of only two American-owned straight deck lake freighters, the other one being the 1958-built freighter John Sherwin.

In their port report from February 7, 2023, Boatnerd reported that Edward L. Ryerson's automatic identification system (AIS) was reactivated for the first time since 2009. Her future, and whether or not she will return to service remains uncertain. In the same report, they further reported that indeterminate work was being carried out on Edward L. Ryerson, despite her owners not making any long-term plans for her future.

== See also ==
- SS Carl D. Bradley
- SS Joseph H. Thompson
- SS Edmund Fitzgerald
- MV Paul R. Tregurtha

== Sources ==
- Bawal, Raymond A. (2009). Twilight of the Great Lakes steamer. Clinton Township, MI: Inland Expressions. ISBN 978-0-9818-1572-5.
- Burdick, Rod (July–August 1997). "Ryerson Returns to Service" (PDF). Telescope. Vol. XLV, no. 4. Detroit, Michigan: Great Lakes Maritime Institute.
- Burdick, Rod (May–June 1999). "Lake Michigan's Ore Port Ship Loader Celebrates 30 Years" (PDF). Telescope. Vol. XLVII, no. 3. Detroit, Michigan: Great Lakes Maritime Institute.
- "Edward L. Ryerson". Manitowoc County Historical Society. 2020.
- Erickson, Andee (November 9, 2019). "Edward Ryerson returns to Cumming Slip". Duluth News Tribune.
- "New Inland Carrier Set for Final Tests". The Times of Northwest Indiana. Munster, Indiana. 1960.
- "New Queen of the Lakes Docks At Inland". The Times of Northwest Indiana. Munster, Indiana. 1960.
- "New Queen to Rule Growing Great Lakes Ore Ship Fleet". The Daily Calumet. Calumet, Illinois. 1960.
- Research and Development: A List of Small Business Concerns Interested in Performing Research and Development. Washington D.C.: Small Business Administration. 1963.
- "Ryerson, Edward L." Bowling Green State University. 2010.
- Shedal, Emily (July 21, 2020). "Manitowoc Shipbuilding's last lake freighter, Ryerson, departed 60 years ago". The Herald Times Reporter.
- "Port Reports – February 7, 2023". Boatnerd. Port Huron, Michigan. 2023.
- "Shipwrecks of Isle Royale National Park (Thematic Group)". National Park Service. Washington D.C. 1987.
- "The Edward L. Ryerson Celebrates Thirty-fifth Anniversary" (PDF). Telescope. Vol. XLIII, no. 5. Detroit, MI: Great Lakes Maritime Institute. September–October 1995.
- Thompson, Mark L. (1991). Steamboats & Sailors of the Great Lakes. Detroit, Michigan: Wayne State University Press. ISBN 978-0-8143-4334-0.
- Thompson, Mark L. (1994). Queen of the Lakes. Detroit, Michigan: Wayne State University Press. ISBN 978-0-8143-2393-9.
- "US Cargo Vessel Management & Steamship Agents". Central Marine Logistics. 2010.
- Wharton, George (2008). "Great Lakes Fleet Page Vessel Feature – Edward L. Ryerson". Boatnerd. Port Huron, Michigan.
- Yuenger, David A. (1960). "Ore Carrier Ryerson New Queen of Lakes". Green Bay Press-Gazette. Green Bay, Wisconsin.
