= Algoma Compass =

Bulk carrier built in 1973

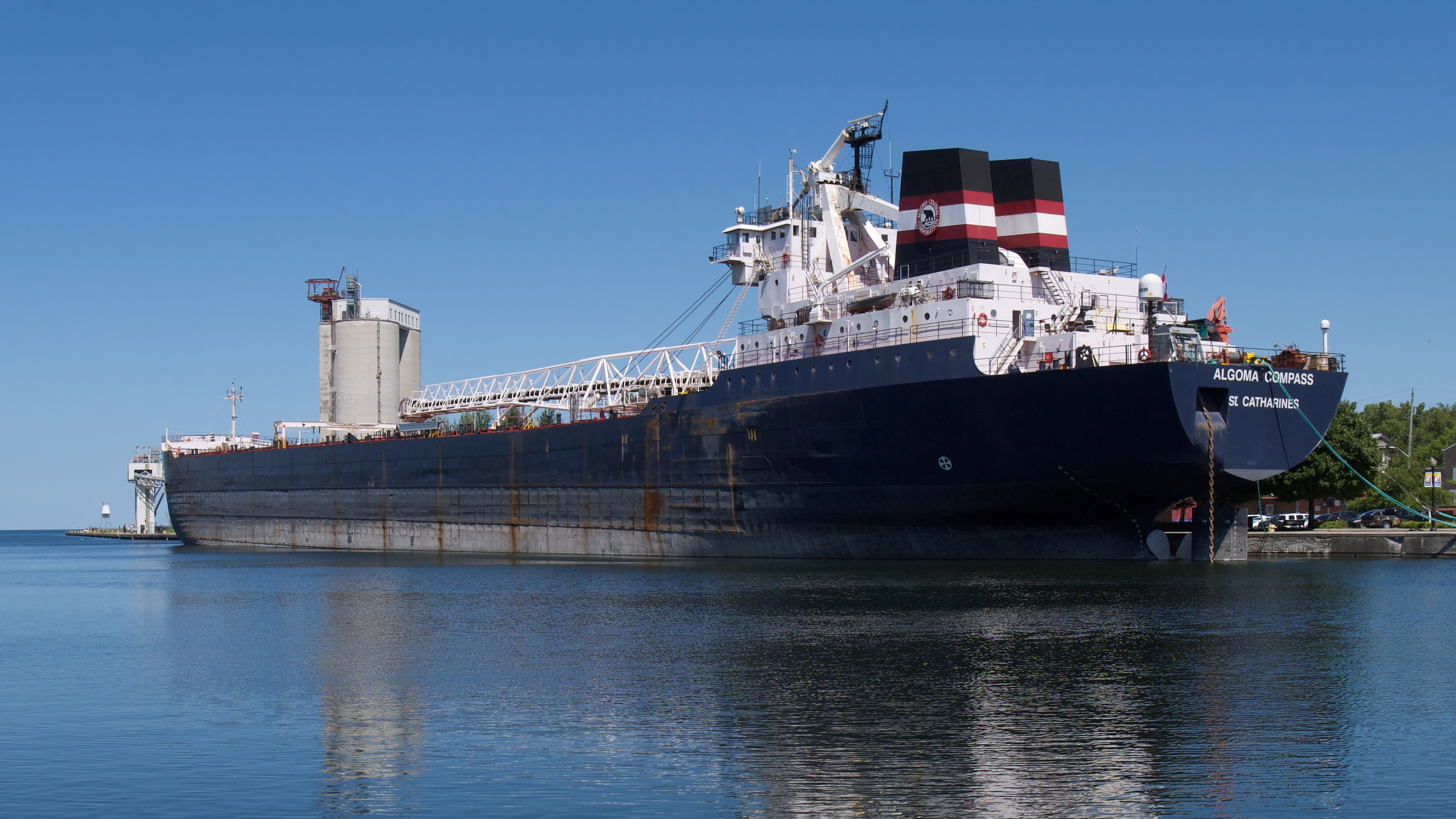
- Algoma Compass docked in Owen Sound, Ontario

History
- Name: Roger M. Kyes (1973–1989); Adam E. Cornelius (1989–2018); Algoma Compass (2018–present)
- Owner: American Steamship Company (1973–2018); Algoma Central (2018–present)
- Port of registry: (United States) Wilmington, Delaware (1973–2018); (Canada) St. Catharines, Ontario (2018–present)
- Builder: American Shipbuilding Company, Toledo
- Yard number: 200
- Launched: March 28, 1973
- Completed: August 1, 1973
- In service: 1973
- Identification: IMO number: 7326245; MMSI number: 316036229
- Status: In service

General characteristics
- Type: Self-unloading bulk carrier
- Tonnage: 18,639 GT; 28,631 DWT
- Length: 207.3 m (680 ft 1 in) oa; 202.6 m (664 ft 8 in) pp
- Beam: 23.8 m (78 ft 1 in)
- Draught: 8.706 m (28 ft 6 3/4 in)
- Installed power: 2 × 2,600 kW (3,500 hp) General Motors Electro Motive Division (EMD) diesel engines
- Propulsion: 1 propeller
- Speed: 14 knots (26 km/h; 16 mph)

Algoma Compass, formerly Roger M. Kyes and Adam E. Cornelius, is a self-unloading bulk carrier built in Toledo, Ohio in 1973 for the American Steamship Company. The bulk carrier carried bulk cargoes throughout the Great Lakes and St. Lawrence Seaway. The vessel has earned a reputation as a "hard luck" ship, experiencing mechanical failures and groundings. In 2018, the ship was acquired by Algoma Central and put in service as Algoma Compass.

== Design and description ==
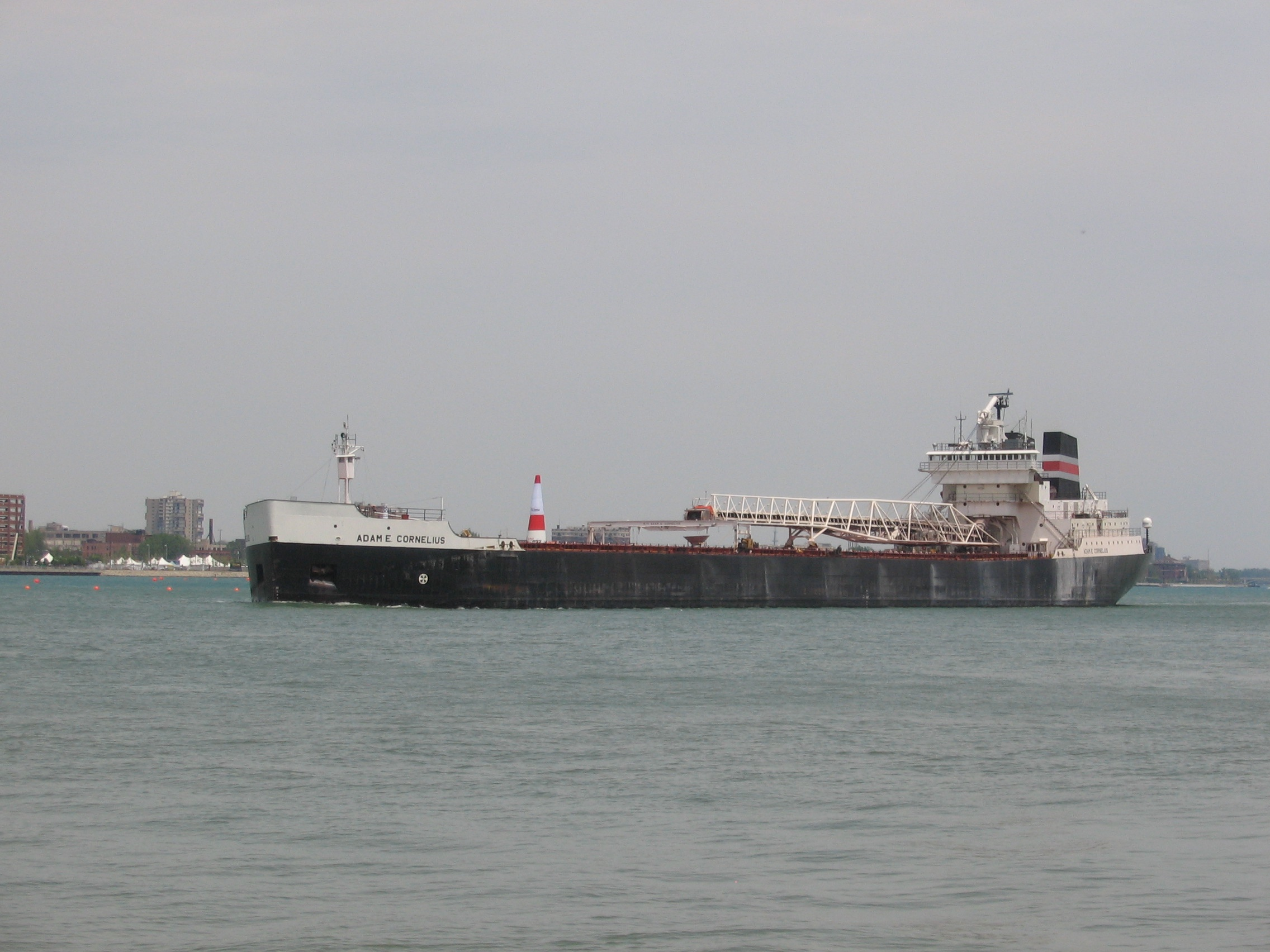
Then known as Adam E. Cornelius in the Detroit River in 2008

A self-discharging bulk carrier, Algoma Compass initially measured 15,674 gross register tons (GRT) and 28,631 tons deadweight (DWT). The ship was later remeasured, though the sources disagree on the totals, at 18,639 gross tonnage (GT) or 29,200 GT at midsummer draught. The deadweight tonnage increased to 29,127. The ship is 207.3 m (680 ft 1 in) long overall and 202.6 m (664 ft 8 in) between perpendiculars with a beam of 23.8 m (78 ft 1 in). The vessel has a midsummer draught of 8.706 m (28 ft 6 3/4 in).

Algoma Compass is powered by two 2,600 kW (3,500 hp) General Motors Electro Motive Division (EMD) type 20-645-E78 two-stroke cycle, single acting V-20 cylinder diesel engines through single reduction gears to a single controllable pitch propeller turning one propeller. The vessel is also equipped with 750 kW (1,000 hp) stern and bow thrusters. Sources disagree on the vessel's maximum speed, quoting 16.1 knots (29.8 km/h; 18.5 mph) and 14 knots (26 km/h; 16 mph).

The bulk carrier has four holds and 20 hatches serviced by a single belt gravity system feeding a stern-mounted incline belt elevator. They supply a 79 metres (260 ft) boom capable of luffing 18 degrees and operating 90 degrees to either port or stern. Algoma Compass has a discharge rate of 5,900 metric tons (5,800 long tons; 6,500 short tons) per hour.

== Construction and career ==
The ship was ordered from the American Shipbuilding Company of Toledo, Ohio with the yard number 200. The ship was launched on March 28, 1973, named Roger M. Kyes. The vessel was named after Roger M. Kyes, a former executive with General Motors and former United States Deputy Secretary of Defense, who served from 1969–1970 as the chairman and chief executive officer of the American Steamship Company. The ship was sponsored by his wife and marked the first ship to be constructed in Toledo since 1959. Roger M. Kyes was completed on August 1, 1973, registered in Wilmington, Delaware for the American Steamship Company and placed in service, transporting bulk cargoes of items such as iron ore pellets throughout the Great Lakes and St. Lawerence Seaway. (Note: Registration of the ship states the owner as the Edison Steamship Company.)

In 1975/76, the bow was ice-strengthened. On September 22, 1976 while in Buffalo, New York's harbour Roger M. Kyes struck bottom tearing holes in two double bottom tanks and damaging three others. The vessel sailed to Chicago, Illinois arriving on September 27 for repairs. On September 7, 1978, the bulk carrier required the aid of tugboats to get the ship to dock after losing power on Lake St. Clair.

While sailing up the Rouge River, Roger M. Kyes's radio mast struck the I-75 freeway bridge over the river on July 24, 1983. On August 23, the ship ran aground in the Detroit River's Trenton Channel. The vessel's cargo was lightered and Roger M. Kyes was freed with the aid of ten tugboats, being taken for repair at Sturgeon Bay, Wisconsin. The ship returned to service the following year.

On October 27, 1987, Roger M. Kyes ran aground again, this time on Gull Island Shoal in Lake Erie. The ship's cargo was lightered again and Roger M. Kyes was able to free herself on October 30. Sent for repair again, in June 1989, she was renamed Adam E. Cornelius, after Adam Edward Cornelius, one of the co-founders of the American Steamship Company, after an older ship named after him was sold. She was the fourth vessel to be named after Cornelius.

From 1994 to 1998, Adam E. Cornelius was chartered to Inland Steel. The vessel ran aground again on July 14, 1994 near the Soo Locks in the St. Marys River. Her cargo was lightered again and after being freed, completed the unloading of her cargo before sailing for Sturgeon Bay for further repairs. In March 1996 and January 1997 Adam E. Cornelius suffered ice damage while operating on the Great Lakes, the latter incident forcing the ship to be escorted to Sturgeon Bay for repairs by the United States Coast Guard and tugboats for fear of the ship sinking. The ship returned to service in 1999.

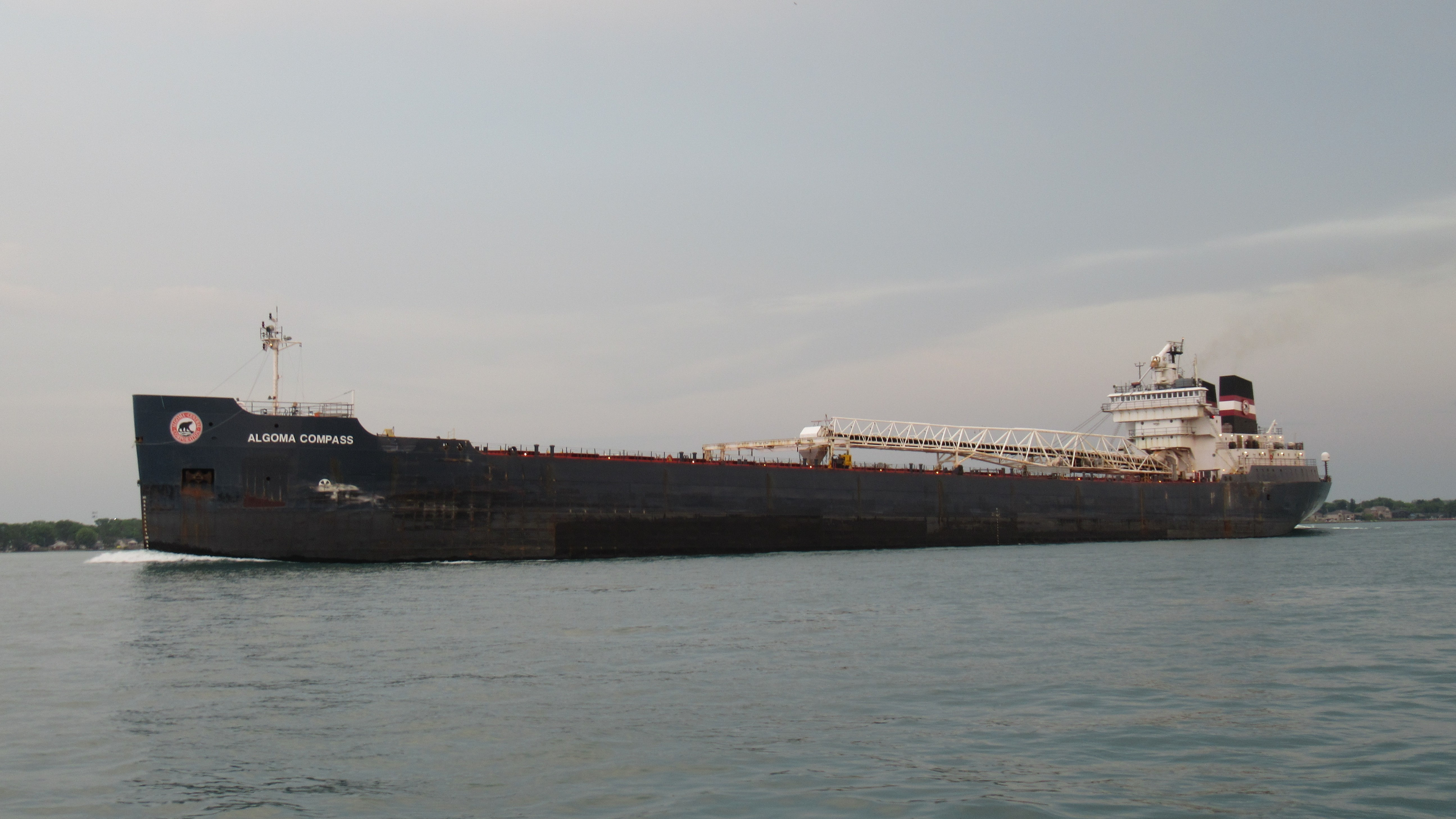
Traveling north along the Detroit River near Grosse Ile

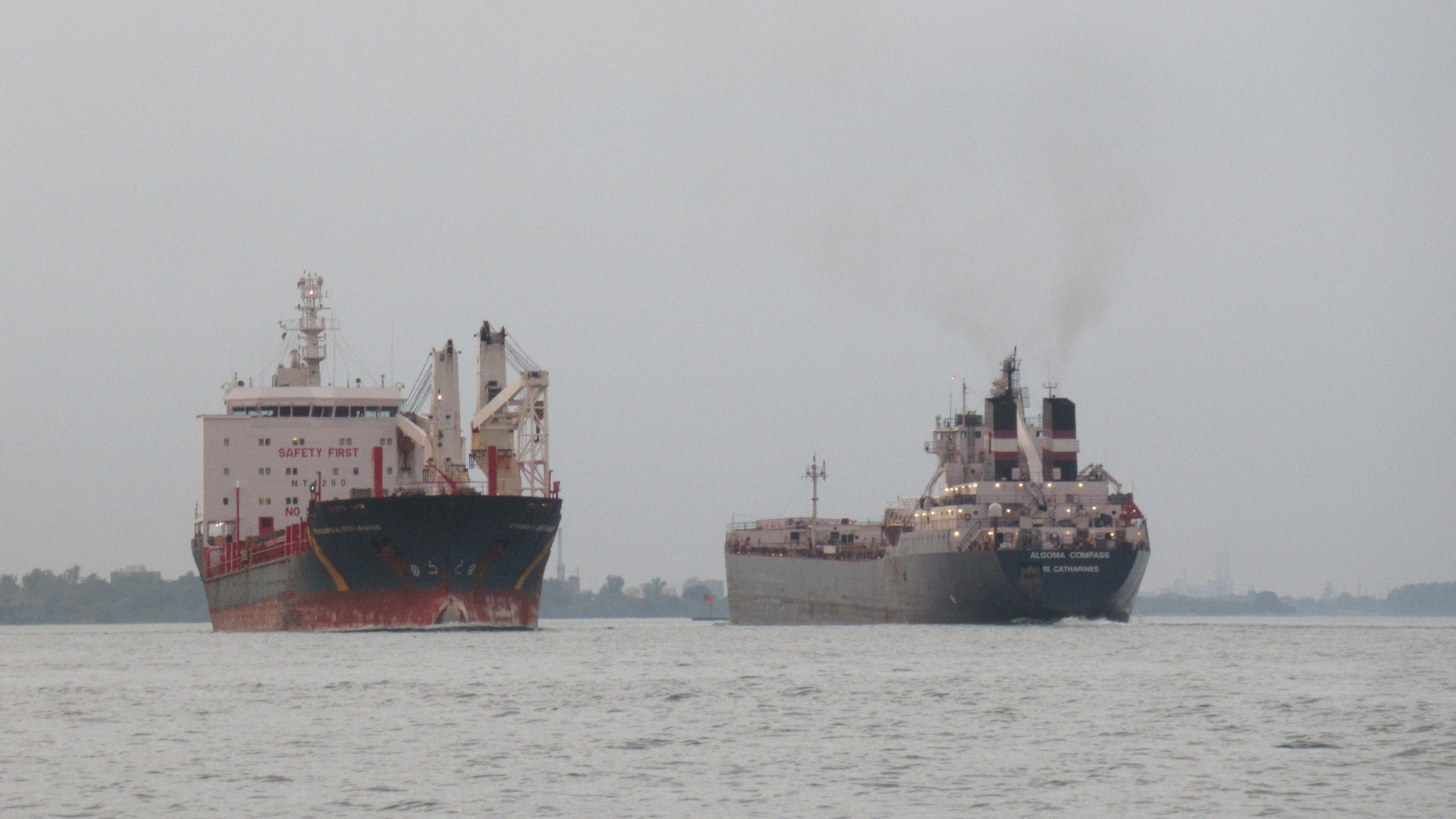
Passing Rosaire A. Desgagnés in the Detroit River

She was laid up in Toledo, Ohio in 2012–2014 and in Huron, Ohio in 2015. In late 2017 she was sold to the Algoma Central Corp., registered in St. Catharines, Ontario and renamed Algoma Compass in 2018. She returned to service in May 2018 after being laid up for nearly two-and-a-half years. In Algoma service, the ship primarily services the road salt and construction material markets.

== See also ==
- Adam E. Cornelius (1908 ship)
- Adam E. Cornelius (1959 ship)
