= Straight decker =

Ship design

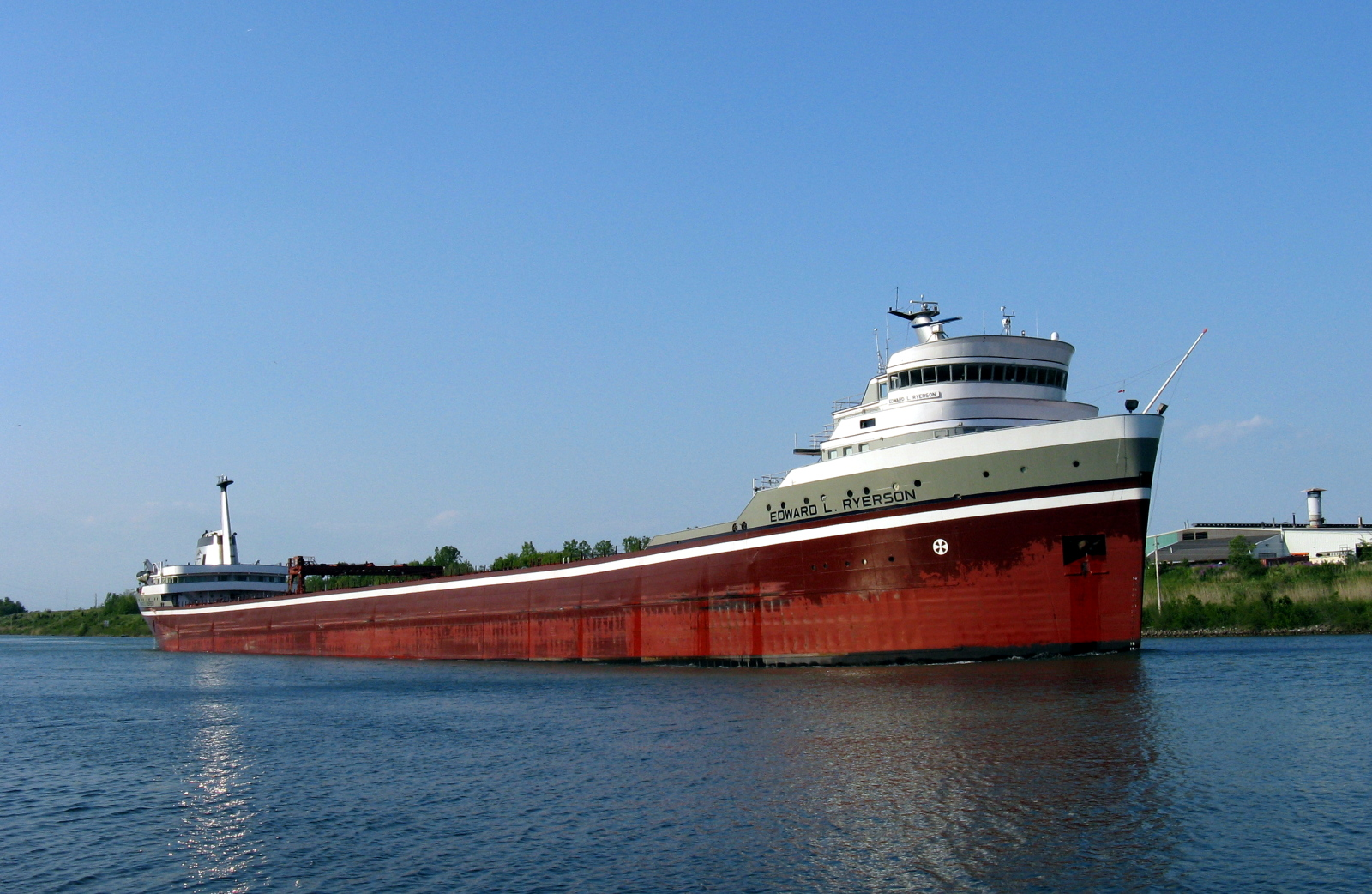
Straight Decker Edward L Ryerson

A straight decker according to the original meaning of the term is a ship built with its pilothouse forward and engines aft to provide a continuous hold in between. This design originated to increase cargo capacity and facilitate loading and unloading of lake freighters on the U.S./Canadian Great Lakes routes. The current common meaning of "straight decker" upon the Great Lakes is a bulk/ore freighter which has not been equipped with self-unloading machinery.

Straight deckers are mainly owned by the Canadian fleets, such as Upper Lakes Shipping (ULS). One exception is the 730-foot U.S. lake freighter Edward L. Ryerson (nicknamed 'Fast Eddie' because of her 19-mph speed). Originally launched in 1960, she had a short layup from 1986 to 1988 due to a downturn in the industry. She went into long term layup in 1998 and joined the fleet once again in 2006, but has been laid up since 2009 at Lake Superior's Fraser Shipyard. The Edward L. Ryerson is one of only two remaining straight-deck bulk carriers still part of the American fleet on the Great Lakes, the other being the John Sherwin. The Ryerson was the last U.S. laker to be built as a steamer (with a GE 9,900 shp cross-compound steam turbine engine), the last to be built without a self-unloader, and the last lake boat to be constructed at the Manitowoc, Wisconsin, shipyards.

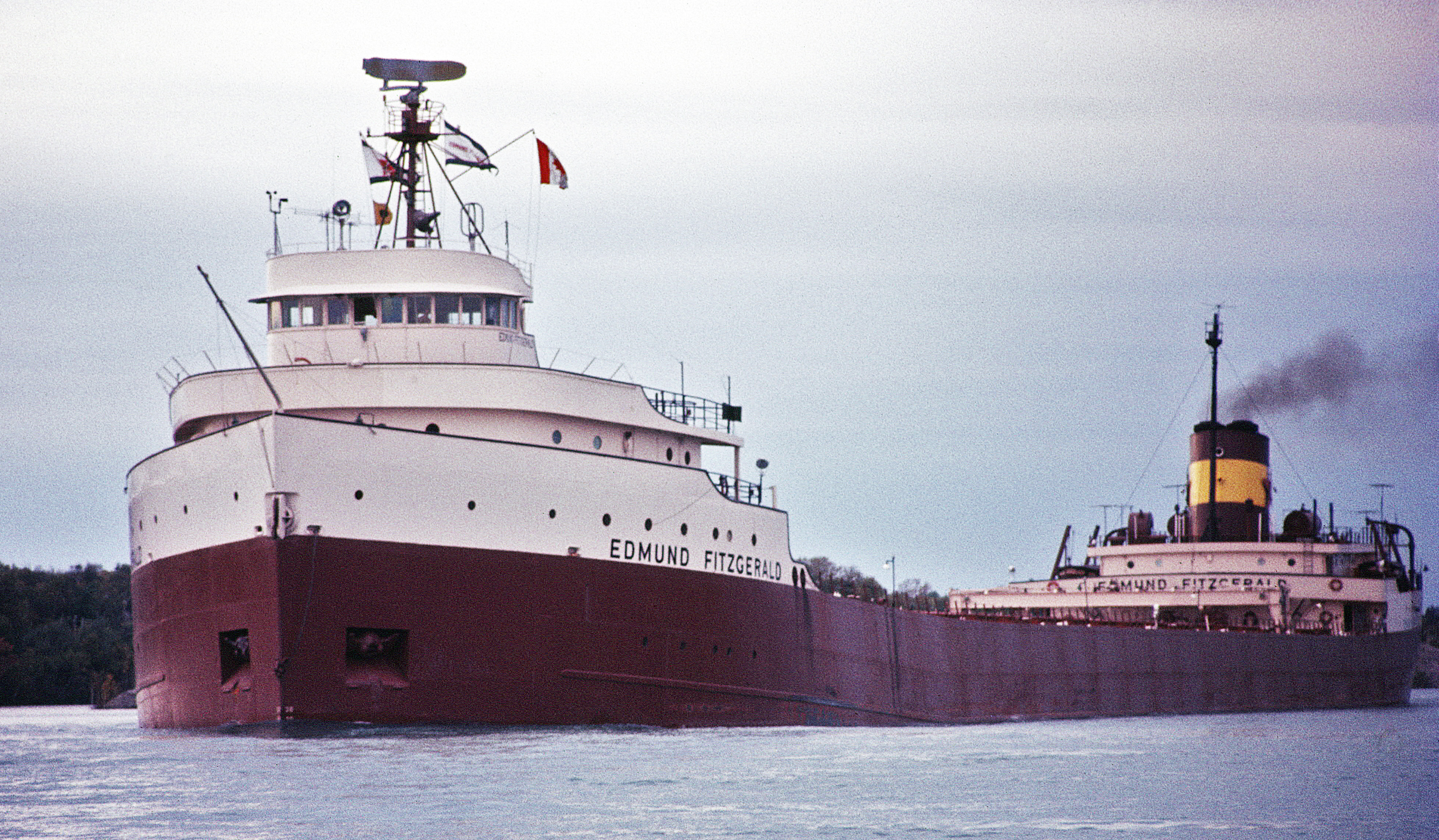
Straight decker Edmund Fitzgerald

Straight deckers without self-unloading gear are loaded and unloaded by gantry cranes or Hulett unloaders. These giants use a clamshell bucket and counterweight system to scoop the cargo out of the holds, one scoop load at a time.

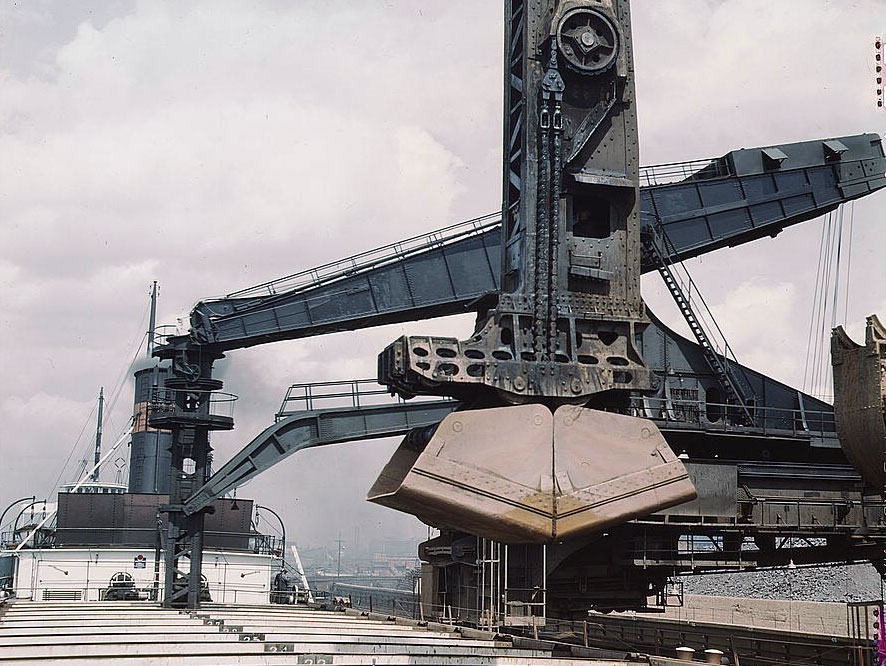
Hulett bucket unloaders at work

Self-unloading equipment is usually in the form of a boom on deck. The boom is usually positioned on the back half of the vessel, pointing forward. The boom is swung out to either side of the vessel, a conveyor system is started, and the offloading process begins. The boom is a much more efficient method of unloading and allows the boat to serve a wider variety of ports which have no shore-side unloading gear. This also allows a greater variety of cargoes to be hauled and, therefore, the opportunity to run more trips each season. Many historic straight deckers have been converted to self-unloaders or retired from service. For instance, the steam-powered straight decker James Norris was converted to a self-unloader in 1980, but by 2008 still had not been converted from steam to diesel. The largest straight-decker, the 806-foot John Sherwin, has not sailed under its own power since 1981, and its conversion to a diesel self-unloader in 2008 was suspended because of the world economic downturn.

Some self unloaders can have a rather straight decker look. For example, the 1000-foot Stewart J. Cort has a shuttle boom inside the aft deckhouse. The shuttle boom can be extended to reach hoppers on the docks, specially designed for the purpose.

== History ==
Early in the 20th century, a new design was becoming prevalent on Great Lakes ore/ bulk cargo freighters. Instead of locating the pilothouse and deckhouses in the center of the ship, the new design placed deck houses at the extreme front and back of the boat. The name "straight deck" referred to the large flat cargo hold expanse in between. This design permitted higher capacity and easier loading and unloading.

Self-unloaders were developed later and then the common meaning of the term evolved to mean a lake carrier without self-unloading equipment and capability.
