= Adam E. Cornelius (1959 ship) =

Lake freighter built in Manitowoc, Wisconsin

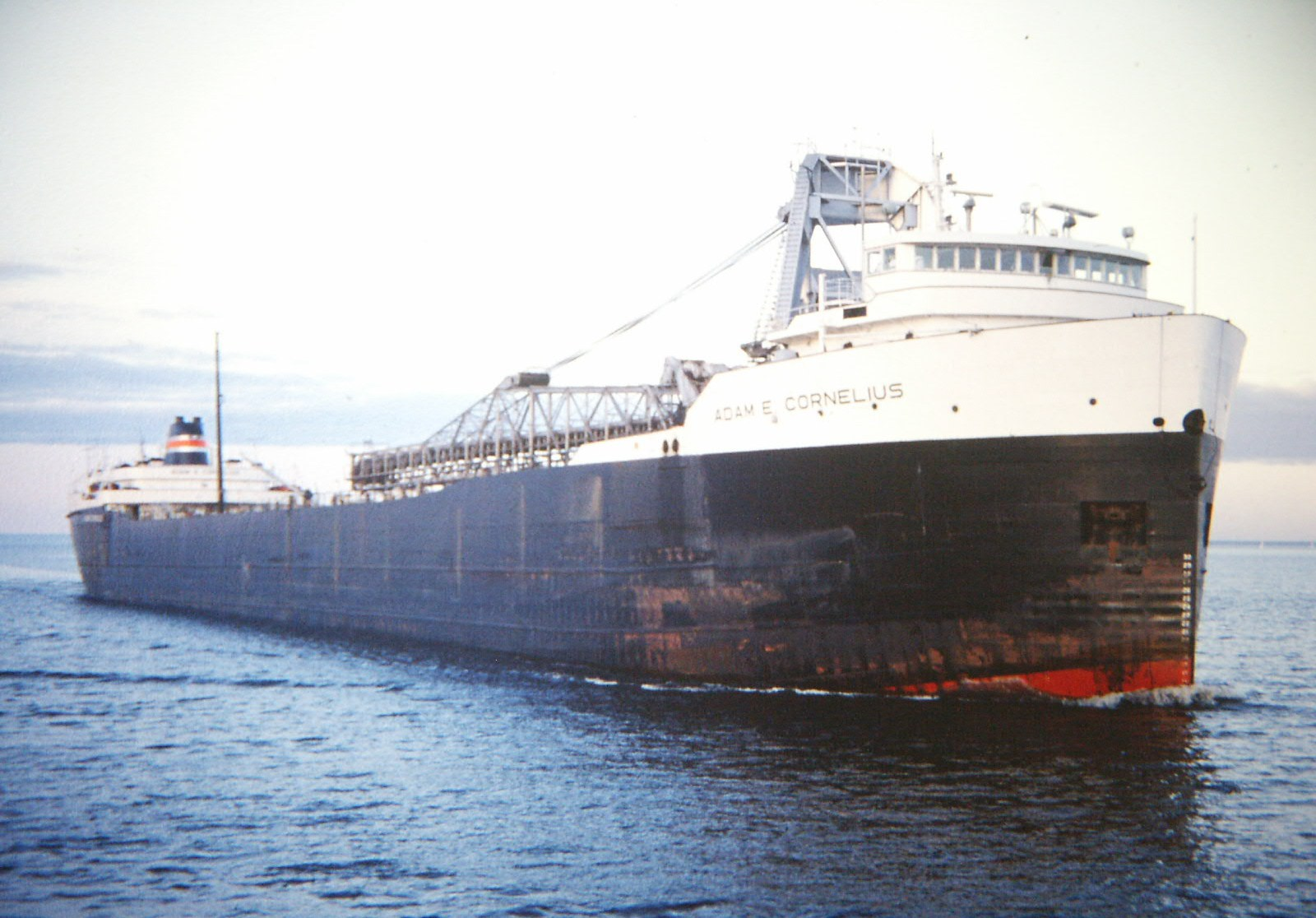
- Adam E. Cornelius in 1979

History
- Name: Adam E. Cornelius
- Namesake: Adam E. Cornelius
- Launched: 1959
- Acquired: 1973

General characteristics

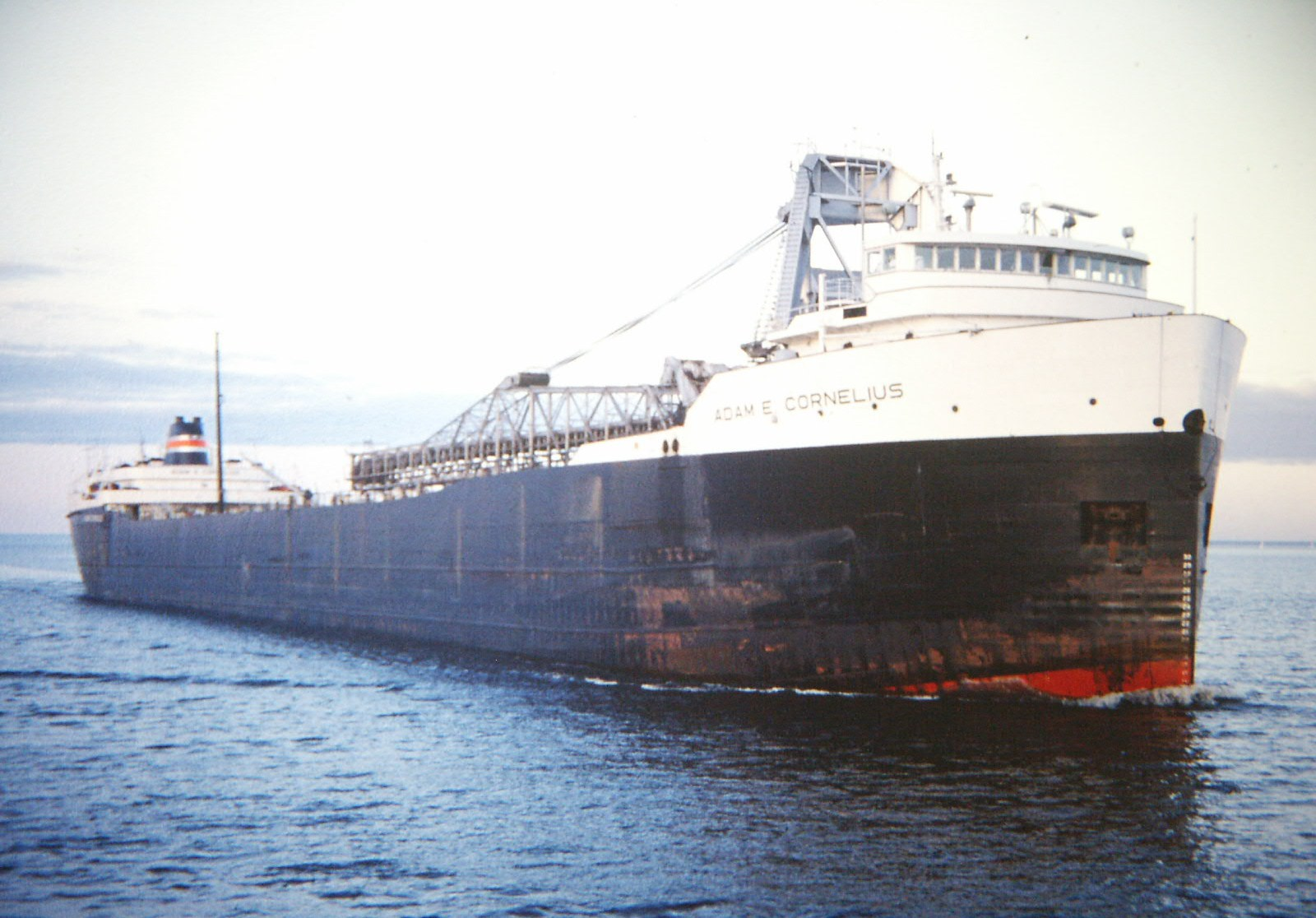
Ship in 1979

Adam E. Cornelius (later the Sea Barge One and the Sarah Spencer) is a former lake freighter built in Manitowoc, Wisconsin, in 1959. She was the third vessel to be named the after one of the co-founders of the American Steamship Company, after the second Adam E. Cornelius had been sold and renamed the Consumers Power.

The third Adam E. Cornelius was sold to Keybulk Transportation in 1973, in its turn, and a fourth vessel took up the Adam E. Cornelius name. After her sale she bore the name Sea Barge One, and was converted to an unpowered barge. After a second sale, in 1989, she was renamed the Captain Edward V. Smith. In 1991 she was renamed again, the Sarah Spencer.

Her conversion to a barge included removing the vessel's original engines, and cutting a large notch in her stern. As a barge the vessel used two different barge-tug coupling systems. Initially she was pushed by the Atlantic Hickory. In 1999 her notch was converted to the Bark River Articulated Tug Barge Coupling System. The tug Jane Ann IV has large pins which mate into sockets in the Sarah Spencer's notch. The Sarah Spencer was listed as for sale as scrap in 2005.

== See also ==
- Adam E. Cornelius (ship, 1908)
- Algoma Compass
