= Adam E. Cornelius =

American businessman (1882–1953)

- Born: 1882
- Died: 1953 (aged 70–71)
- Other name: Adam Edward Cornelius
- Occupation: shipping executive
- Known for: cofounded American Steamship Company

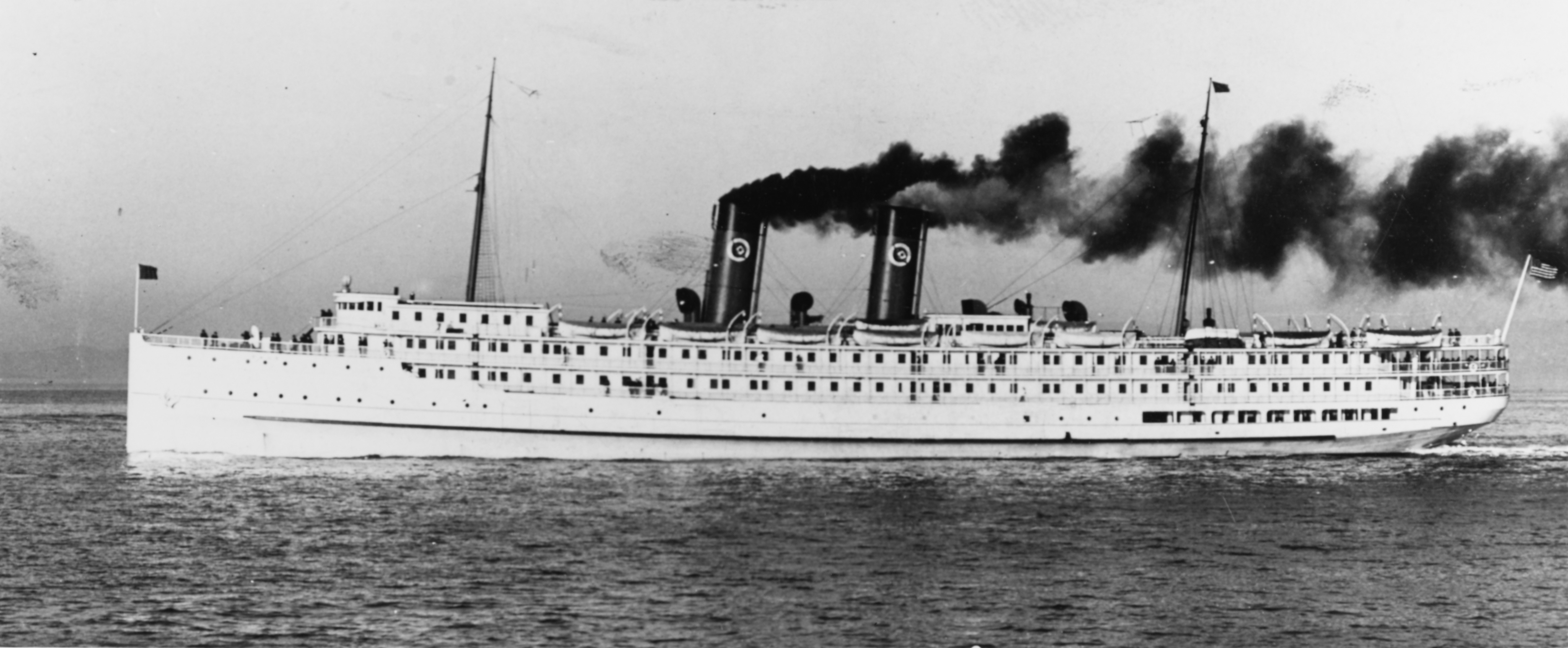
Boland and Cornelius first ship, the SS Yale, shown underway prior to World War I, served as USS Yale (ID-1672), 1918–1920 and as USS Greyhound (IX-106), 1943–1944.

Adam E. Cornelius (1882–1953) was one of the co-founders of the American Steamship Company and Boland and Cornelius Company.

== Biography ==
At age 20, Cornelius went to work for a small shipbroking and shipping chartering business owned by John J. Boland in Buffalo, New York. Cornelius' position was an entry-level job, earning just $6 a week, but, by 1904, he had proven his worth and Boland invited him to enter into a partnership with his firm. In 1907, Boland and Cornelius launched a company which they named the American Steamship Company. Their first vessel, the SS Yale was the first steel vessel owned by a Buffalo firm and earned large profits for the partners. Boland and Cornelius ran the American Steamship Company successfully until the Great Depression, at which point Cornelius came up with the idea of converting the company's fleet to self-unloaders. This strategy paid off. Cornelius' son, Adam E. Cornelius Jr. was involved with the American Steamship Company, and took over as chairman after Cornelius Sr. died in 1953.

Four vessels owned by the American Steamship Company have been named the Adam E. Cornelius in his honor, in 1908, 1948, 1959, and 1973.
