= MV John J. Boland =

Diesel-powered lake freighter owned and operated by American Steamship Company

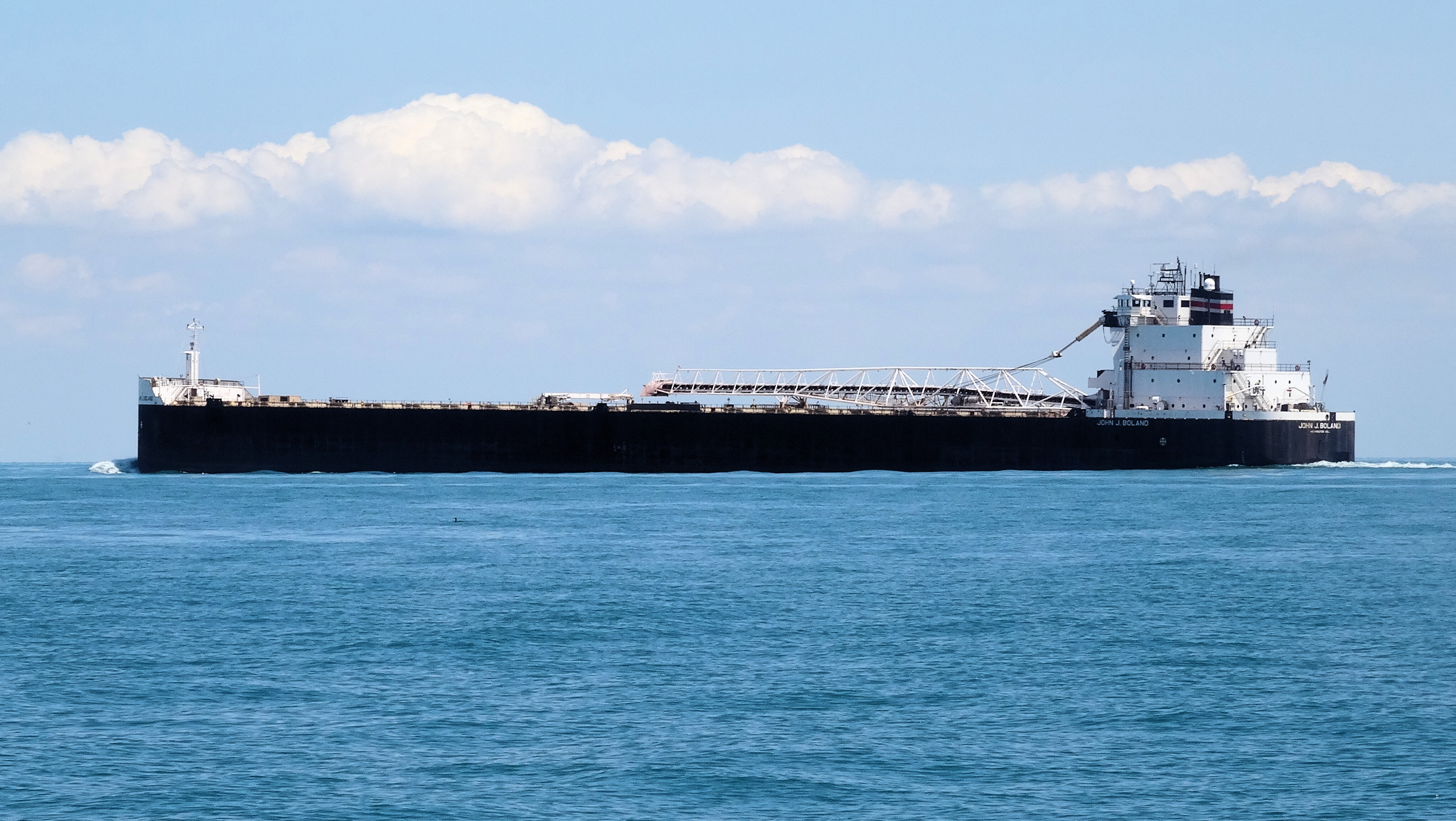
- John J. Boland in Lake St. Clair heading into the St. Clair River

History

United States
- Name: Charles E. Wilson
- Namesake: Charles Erwin Wilson (John J. Boland)
- Port of registry: (United States) Wilmington, Delaware
- Builder: Bay Shipbuilding Company
- Yard number: 710
- Launched: March 10, 1973
- Sponsored by: Mrs. T. M. Thompson
- In service: September 1, 1973
- Renamed: John J. Boland (2000)
- Identification: Call sign: WZE4539; IMO number: 7318901; MMSI number: 366938780
- Status: In active service

General characteristics
- Class & type: Lake freighter
- Tonnage: 13,862 GRT; 9,712 NT
- Length: 680 feet (207 m) (overall); 666.8 feet (203 m)
- Beam: 78.1 ft (23.8 m)
- Draft: 30 ft 11.125 in (9.42658 m) (Midsummer Draft); 42.7 ft (13.0 m) (hull depth)
- Propulsion: two 3,500 hp (2,600 kW) General Motors Electro Motive Division (EMD) diesel engines, 7,000 shp (5,200 kW)

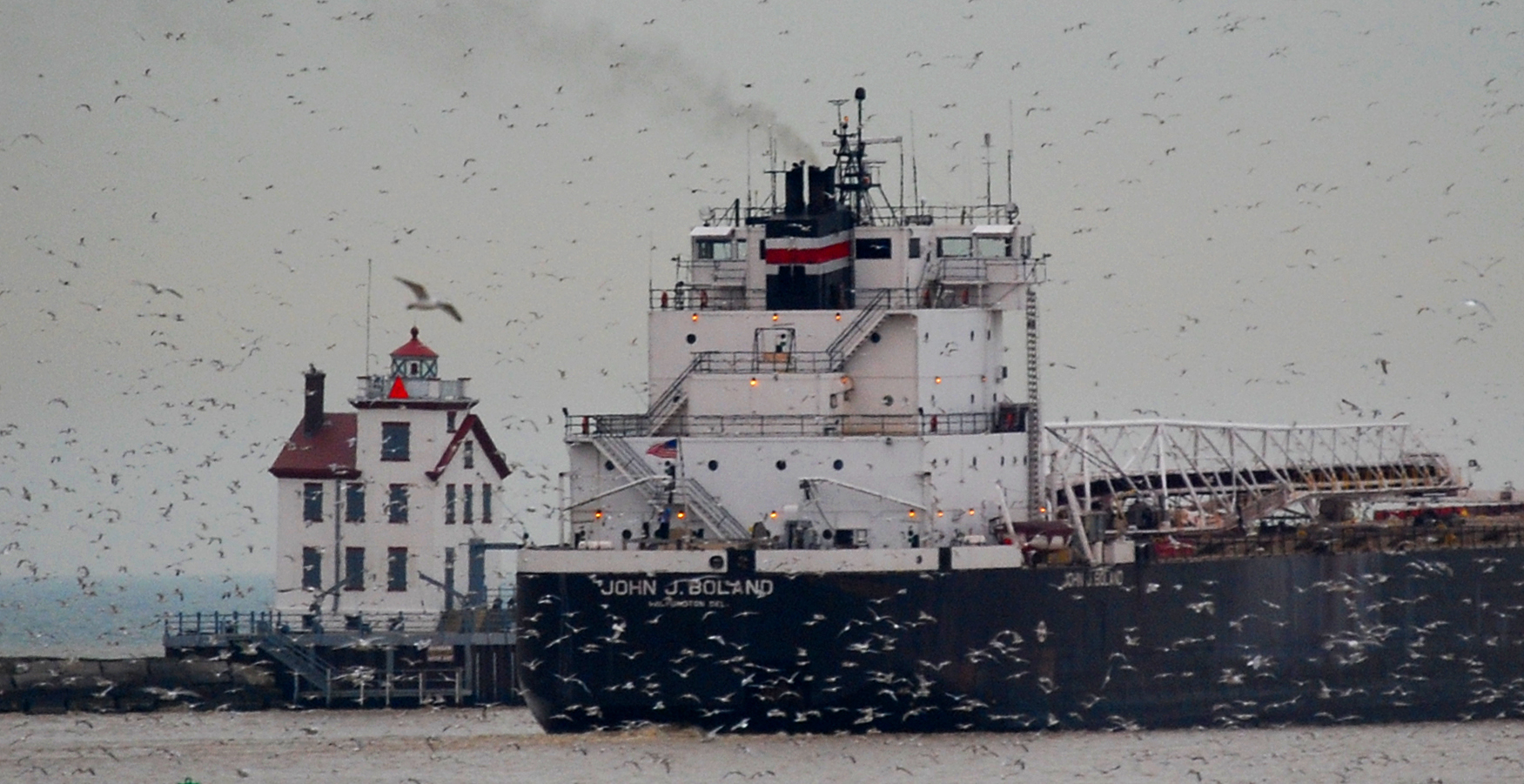
John J. Boland passing the Lorain West Breakwater Light

MV John J. Boland is a diesel-powered lake freighter owned and operated by the Buffalo-based American Steamship Company (ASC), a subsidiary of Rand Logistics. This vessel was built in 1973 at Bay Shipbuilding Company, Sturgeon Bay, Wisconsin. Initially named Charles E. Wilson, the vessel was renamed to its current name in 2000.

She is a self-unloading vessel, with a 250-foot (76 m) boom, mounting a conveyor belt, that could be swung to port or starboard. The ship is 680 feet (210 m) long and 78 feet (24 m) wide, with a carrying capacity of 34,000 tons (at midsummer draft), limestone, grain, coal or iron ore.

== Design and description ==
The bulk carrier is 680 ft 1 in (207.3 m) long overall and 666 ft 0 in (203 m) between perpendiculars with a beam of 78 ft 5 in (23.9 m). At the time of construction, the vessel was measured at 13,862 gross register tons (GRT) and 33,438 tons deadweight (DWT). The ship is powered by two GM diesel engines rated at 3,600 horsepower (2,700 kW) driving one shaft and bow and stern thrusters. The ship has a maximum speed of 13 knots (24 km/h; 15 mph). She is a self-unloading vessel, with a 250-foot (76 m) boom, mounting a conveyor belt, that could be swung 105° to port or starboard. The ship has 22 hatches for 6 holds.

== Service history ==
The ship was built under the terms of the Merchant Marine Act of 1970, the first of nine vessels built by the Buffalo-based American Steamship Company, taking advantage of the Act's loan guarantees. She cost $13.7 million USD. The ship was constructed by Bay Shipbuilding at their yard in Sturgeon Bay, Wisconsin with the yard number 710. The ship was launched on March 10, 1973 and completed on September 1 later that year as Charles E. Wilson. The official owner of the ship is the Franklin Steamship Company, a subsidiary of the American Steamship Company, with the exception of a short period in 1978 where the American Steam Ship Company took over. The vessel is registered in Wilmington, Delaware.

Operated by the American Steamship Company on the Great Lakes, Charles E. Wilson served uneventfully until 2000. In January 2000 the third ship to be named John J. Boland was sold and Charles E. Wilson was renamed John J. Boland. On January 2, 2018 John J. Boland was among the ships that became trapped in ice on Lake Erie. The ship was freed by United States Coast Guard vessels on January 4. The ship is currently in service.
