= SS Harold T. Andrews =

World War II Liberty ship of the United States

History

United States
- Name: Harold T. Andrews
- Namesake: Harold T. Andrews
- Owner: War Shipping Administration (WSA)
- Operator: Boland & Cornelius
- Ordered: as type (EC2-S-C1) hull, MC hull 1544
- Builder: J.A. Jones Construction, Panama City, Florida
- Cost: $1,351,796
- Yard number: 26
- Way number: 4
- Laid down: 15 November 1943
- Launched: 28 December 1943
- Completed: 19 February 1944
- Identification: Call Signal: KVQJ
- Fate: Laid up in National Defense Reserve Fleet Mobile, Alabama, 10 July 1946; Sold for commercial use, 11 May 1949

General characteristics
- Class & type: Liberty ship; type EC2-S-C1, standard
- Tonnage: 10,865 LT DWT; 7,176 GRT
- Displacement: 3,380 long tons (3,434 t) (light); 14,245 long tons (14,474 t) (max)
- Length: 441 feet 6 inches (135 m) oa; 416 feet (127 m) pp; 427 feet (130 m) lwl
- Beam: 57 feet (17 m)
- Draft: 27 ft 9.25 in (8.4646 m)
- Installed power: 2 × Oil fired 450 °F (232 °C) boilers, operating at 220 psi (1,500 kPa); 2,500 hp (1,900 kW)
- Propulsion: 1 × triple-expansion steam engine, (manufactured by Filer and Stowell, Milwaukee, Wisconsin); 1 × screw propeller
- Speed: 11.5 knots (21.3 km/h; 13.2 mph)
- Capacity: 562,608 cubic feet (15,931 m^{3}) (grain); 499,573 cubic feet (14,146 m^{3}) (bale)
- Complement: 38–62 USMM; 21–40 USNAG
- Armament: Varied by ship; Bow-mounted 3-inch (76 mm)/50-caliber gun; Stern-mounted 4-inch (102 mm)/50-caliber gun; 2–8 × single 20-millimeter (0.79 in) Oerlikon anti-aircraft (AA) cannons and/or, 2–8 × 37-millimeter (1.46 in) M1 AA guns

SS Harold T. Andrews was a Liberty ship built in the United States during World War II. She was named after Harold T. Andrews, an ordinary seaman serving on SS West Nohno that, on 15 September 1942, in Suez, Egypt, saved an engineer that was trapped in the forepeak tank. He was posthumously awarded with the Merchant Marine Distinguished Service Medal.

== Construction ==
Harold T. Andrews was laid down on 15 November 1943, under a United States Maritime Commission (MARCOM) contract, MC hull 1544, by J.A. Jones Construction, Panama City, Florida; she was launched on 28 December 1943.

== History ==
She was allocated to Boland & Cornelius, on 19 February 1944. On 10 July 1946, she was laid up in the National Defense Reserve Fleet, in Mobile, Alabama. On 11 May 1949, she was sold to Astra Steamship Corp., for commercial use. She was withdrawn from the fleet on 13 May 1949.

== Bibliography ==
- "Jones Construction, Panama City FL". ShipbuildingHistory.com. 13 October 2010.
- "Liberty Ships – World War II".
- Maritime Administration. "Harold T. Andrews". Ship History Database Vessel Status Card. U.S. Department of Transportation, Maritime Administration. Archived from the original on 12 December 2019.
- Davies, James (May 2004). "Specifications (As-Built)" (PDF). p. 23.
- "SS Harold T. Andrews".
