= Self-discharger =

Ship able to discharge cargo using its own gear

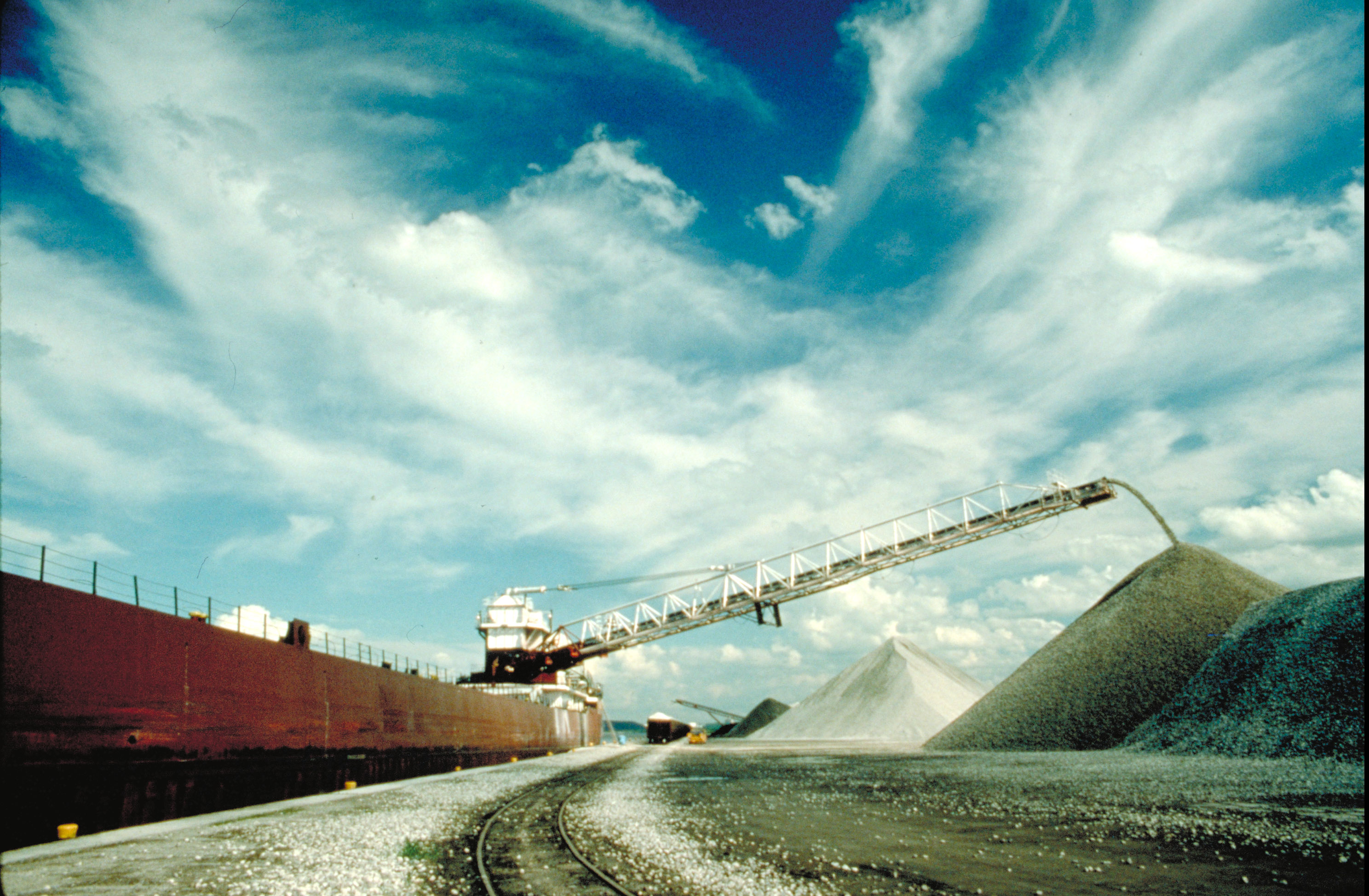
Lake freighter unloading limestone

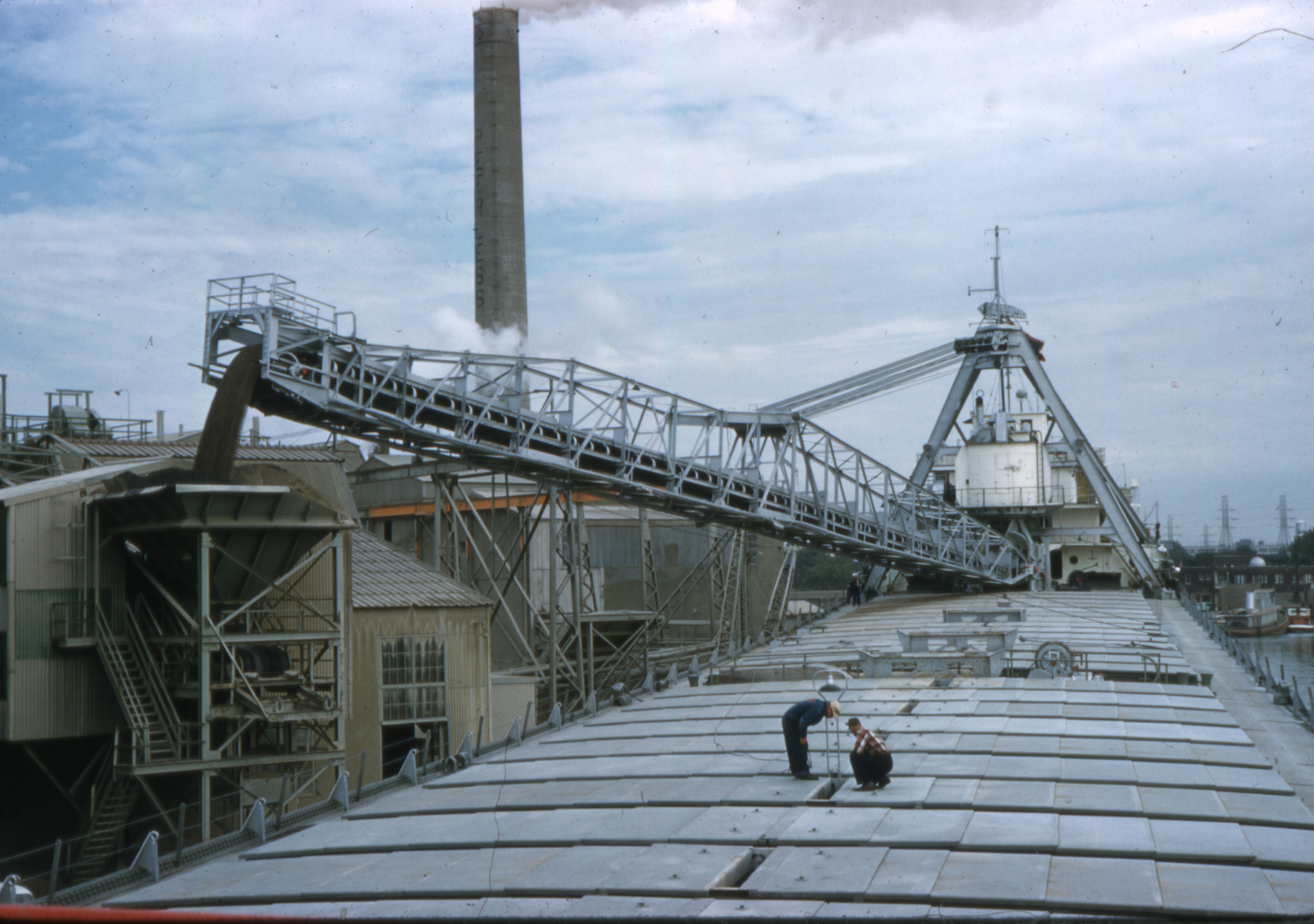
SS Carl D. Bradley unloading hopper in 1958

A self-discharger (or self-unloader) is a ship that is able to discharge its cargo using its own gear. The most common discharge method for bulk cargo is to use an excavator that is fitted on a traverse running over the vessel's entire hatch, and that is able to move sideways as well. Lake freighters on the Great Lakes use conveyor-based unloading gear to empty funnel-shaped holds from the bottom, lifting the bulk cargo onto a boom.

== See also ==
- Adam E. Cornelius
- Auxiliary crane ship
- Boland and Cornelius Company
