= SS William G. Mather (1905) =

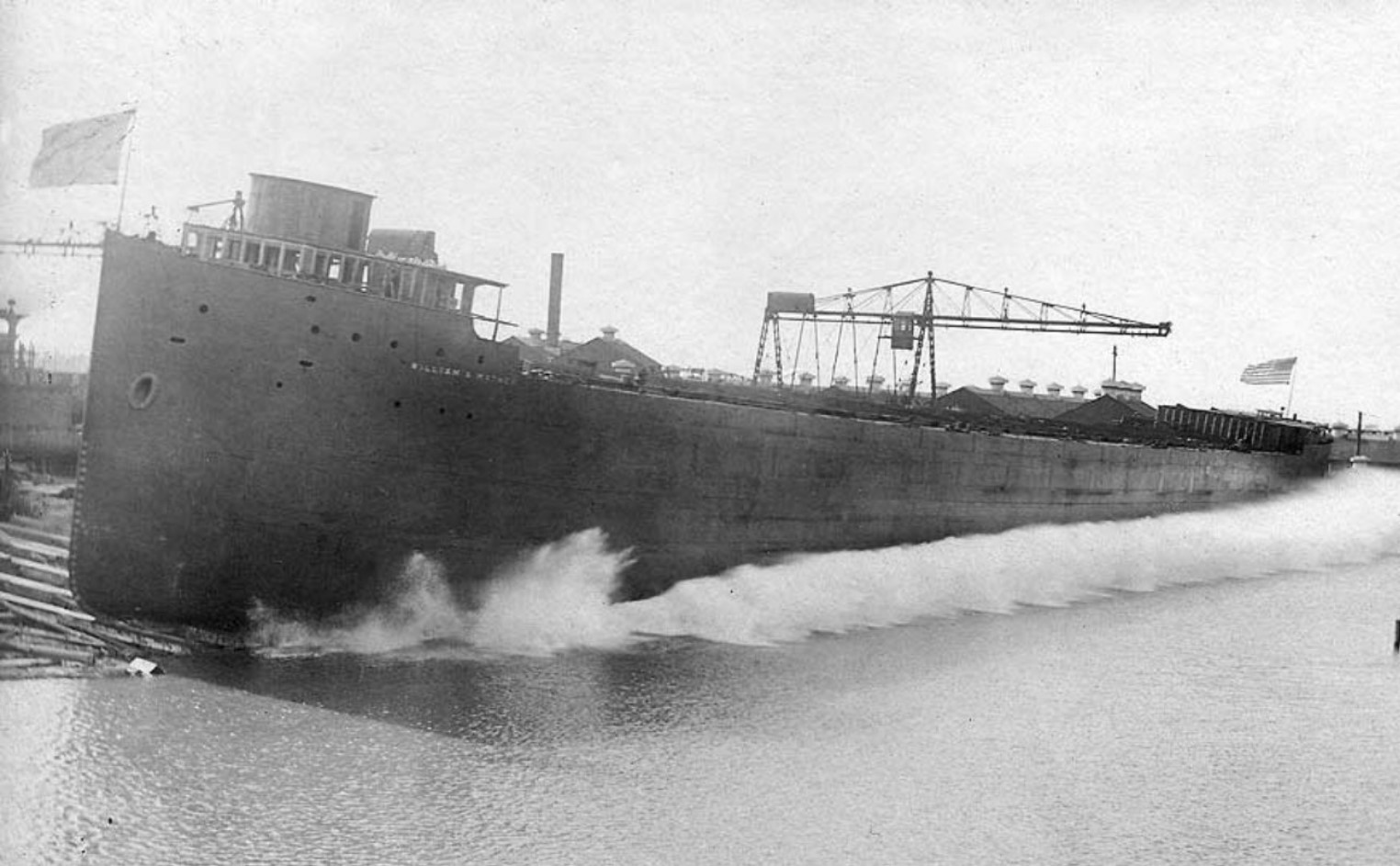
- The launch of the William G. Mather

History

United States
- Name: William G. Mather (1905–1925); J.H. Sheadle (1925–1955); H.L. Gobeille (1955–1965); Nicolet (1965–1996)
- Namesake: William G. Mather
- Operator: Grand Island Steamship Company (Cleveland-Cliffs Iron Co., Mgr.) (1905–1919); Cleveland-Cliffs Iron Company (1919–1964); Gartland Steamship Company (1964–1969); American Steamship Company (1969–1996)
- Port of registry: United States, Ishpeming, Michigan (1905–1919); Fairport, Michigan (1919–1932); Wilmington, Delaware (1932–1996)
- Builder: Great Lakes Engineering Works, Ecorse, Michigan
- Yard number: 9
- Laid down: May 18, 1905
- Launched: September 23, 1905
- Completed: 1905
- In service: 1905
- Out of service: 1996
- Identification: U.S. Registry #202542; IMO number: 5139076
- Fate: Scrapped in Port Maitland, Ontario, in 1996
- Notes: In 1974 she had a new diesel engine installed by Defoe Shipbuilding Company of Bay City, Michigan

General characteristics
- Tonnage: 6,838 GT; 5,183 NT
- Length: 533 ft (162 m)
- Beam: 60 ft (18 m)
- Height: 31 ft (9.4 m)
- Installed power: 2 x Scotch marine boilers
- Propulsion: 2,000 hp (1,500 kW) triple expansion steam engine
- Speed: 10 knots (19 km/h; 12 mph)
- Notes: The William G. Mather was the first Great Lakes freighter to have a 60 ft (18 m) beam

The SS William G. Mather was a 533-foot (162 m) long Great Lakes freighter that was built in 1905, by the Great Lakes Engineering Works (GLEW) of Ecorse, Michigan, for the Grand Island Steamship Company (managed by Cleveland-Cliffs Iron Company). Her keel was laid on May 18, 1905. She was launched on September 23, 1905, as hull #9. The ship was named after William G. Mather, the Cleveland-Cliffs executive. She was powered by a 2,000-horsepower (1,500 kW) triple expansion steam engine which was attached to a single fixed-pitch propeller. She was fueled by two coal-fired Scotch marine boilers.

She entered service in January 1905, and was the first Great Lakes freighter with a 60-foot (18 m) beam.

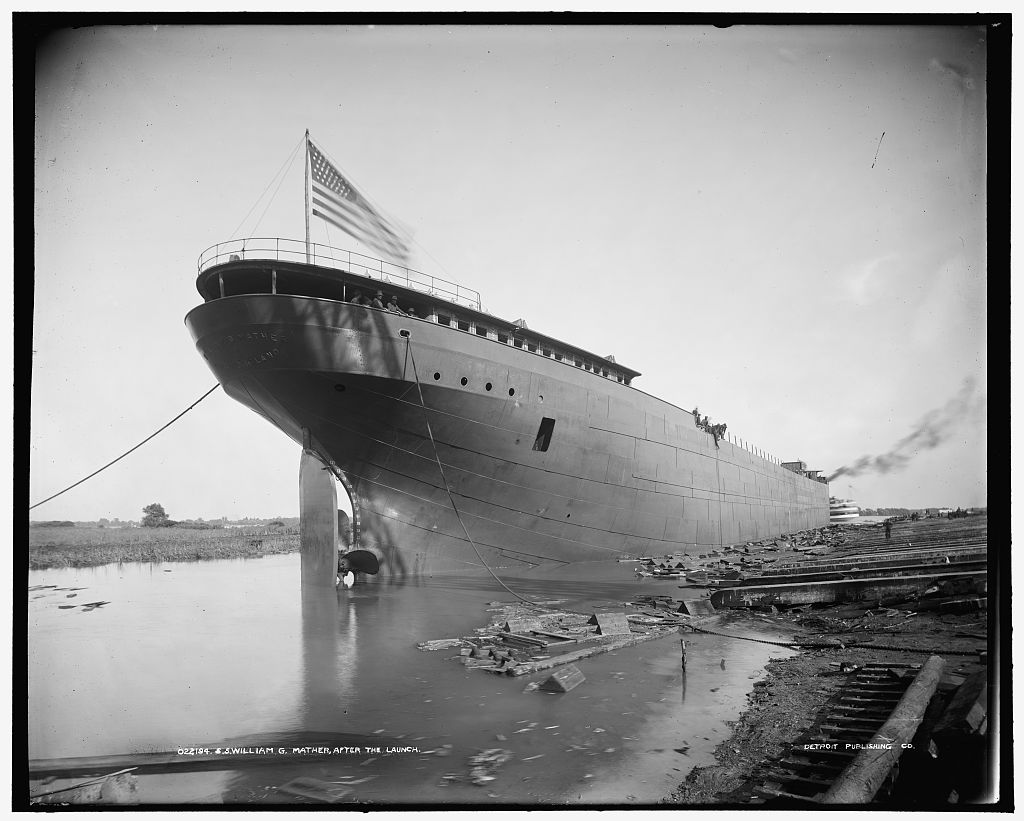
The William G. Mather after her launch

== New owners ==
In 1919 the William G. Mather was transferred to the Cleveland-Cliffs Iron Company of Cleveland, Ohio. She served for six years under her original name. In 1925 Cleveland-Cliffs acquired a new freighter (also named William G. Mather) because of this, the original William G. Mather was renamed J.H. Sheadle. In 1932 the J.H. Sheadle was re-registered to Wilmington, Delaware. She operated for thirty years under the name J.H. Sheadle. In 1955 she was renamed H.L. Gobeille. She did not sail throughout the 1962 and the 1963 seasons.

In 1964 the H.L. Gobeille was sold to the Gartland Steamship Company of Chicago, Illinois. After she was acquired by Gartland Steamship, she was converted to a self-unloading freighter by the Manitowoc Shipbuilding Company. In 1965 she was renamed Nicolet. In 1969 Gartland Steamship's fleet was sold to the American Steamship Company of Buffalo, New York (managed by Boland & Cornelius). On April 5, 1972 the Nicolet cracked about 55 of her hull plates off Beaver Island on Lake Michigan when she was squeezed by ice. She saved herself by unloading part of her cargo into the nearby steamer William G. Mather. The cost to repair her was about $200,000. In 1974 the Nicolet had a new diesel engine installed by the Defoe Shipbuilding Company of Bay City, Michigan. On December 29, 1979 the Nicolet's forward cabins were seriously damaged in a fire that broke out on her self-unloading gear when it was ignited by sparks from an acetylene torch, while she was being repaired in Toledo, Ohio by the Hans Hansen Welding Company. A new pilothouse and cabins were installed by the American Shipbuilding Company. The Nicolet resumed service in 1981.

== Scrapping ==
She was laid up in 1990 never to sail again. In 1996 she was sold for scrap to the International Marine Salvage Company. She was towed to Port Maitland, Ontario and scrapped.
