= Auxiliary crane ship =

Vessels equipped with cranes

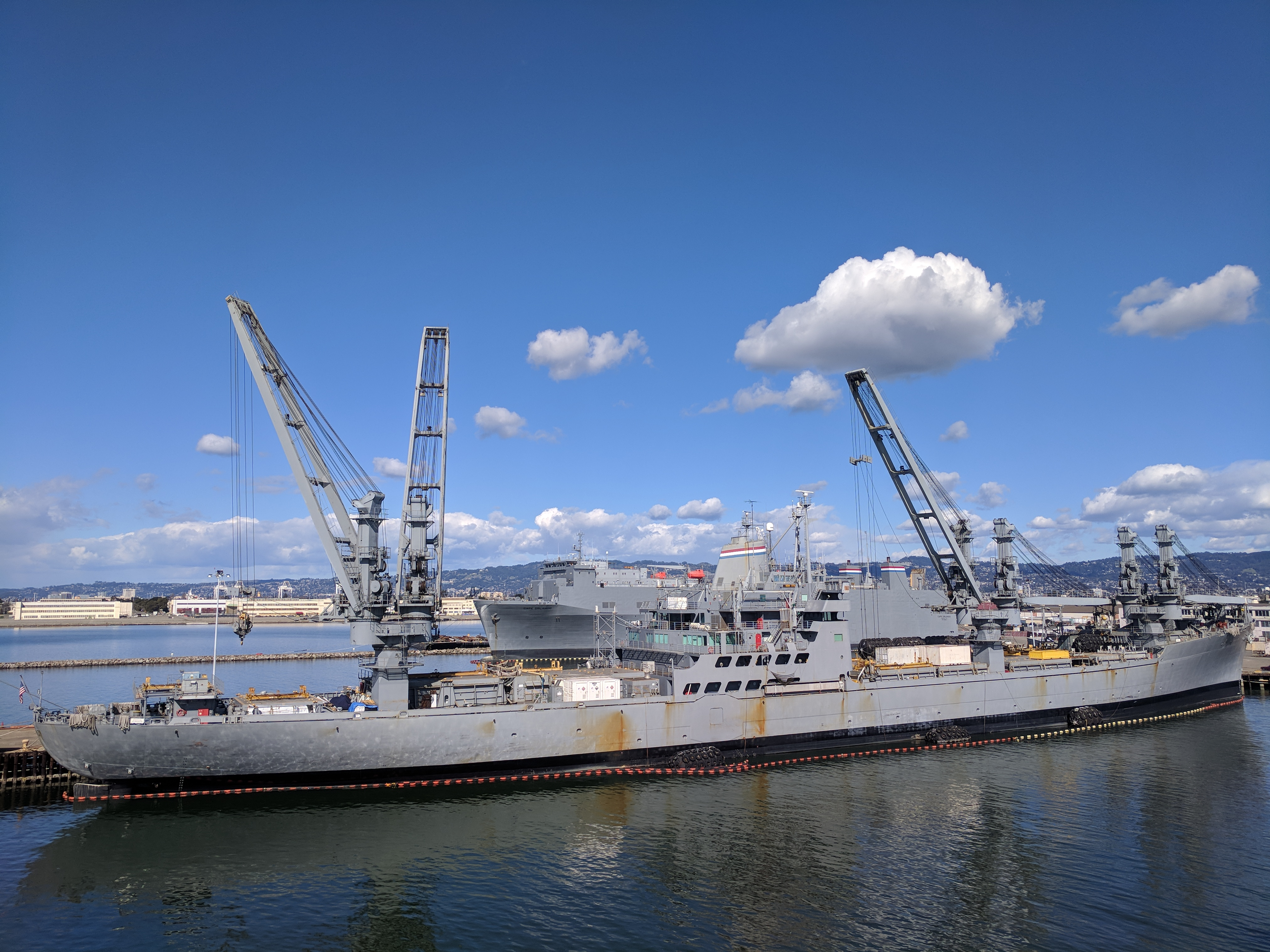
SS Gem State SS Gem State (T-ACS-2) at Alameda

An auxiliary crane ship is a vessel of the United States Military Sealift Command designed to operate where port facilities are limited or damaged to transfer cargo between themselves, other vessels, and piers.

== Description ==
Auxiliary crane ships are converted commercial container ships, equipped with pedestal cranes capable of lifting containers and other cargo. These are used to unload cargo from their own holds as well from other vessels at port facilities which do not have their own cargo handling capability.

These ships give the Military Sealift Command the ability to deliver cargo to locations that would otherwise be inaccessible or difficult to deliver cargo to in a timely manner. This increases the Command's capabilities in responding to needs worldwide, both in locations which are underdeveloped as well as those that have suffered destruction from conflict or natural disasters.

The ships retain the ability to carry more than 300 standard containers.

== Service ==
The first crane ship was completed as such in 1984, and a total of 10 vessels were converted through 1997. All were former commercial vessels. Builders which participated in the program were Defoe Shipbuilding Company in Bay City, Michigan, Dillingham Ship Repair in Portland, Oregon, Norshipco in Norfolk, Virginia, Tampa Shipyard in Tampa, Florida, and Keith Ship Repair in New Orleans, Louisiana.

Within the Military Sealift Command, the ships serve as part of the Ready Reserve Force. Five crane ships were deployed to the Persian Gulf in 1990 and 1991, while a single example served as a temporary Army prepositioning ship in 1994. Four crane ships were transferred to the National Defense Reserve Fleet on 28 July 2006.

== Ships in class ==
- SS Keystone State (T-ACS-1) (Military Sealift Command Ready Reserve Force)
- SS Gem State (T-ACS-2) (Military Sealift Command Ready Reserve Force)
- SS Grand Canyon State (T-ACS-3) (Military Sealift Command Ready Reserve Force)
- SS Gopher State (T-ACS-4) (Military Sealift Command Ready Reserve Force)
- SS Flickertail State (T-ACS-5) (Military Sealift Command Ready Reserve Force)
- SS Cornhusker State (T-ACS-6) (Military Sealift Command Ready Reserve Force)
- SS Diamond State (T-ACS-7) (National Defense Reserve Fleet)
- SS Equality State (T-ACS-8) (National Defense Reserve Fleet)
- SS Green Mountain State (T-ACS-9) (National Defense Reserve Fleet)
- SS Beaver State (T-ACS-10) (National Defense Reserve Fleet)

== See also ==
- List of Military Sealift Command ships
- List of auxiliaries of the United States Navy
