= SS Alexander Lillington =

World War II Liberty ship of the United States

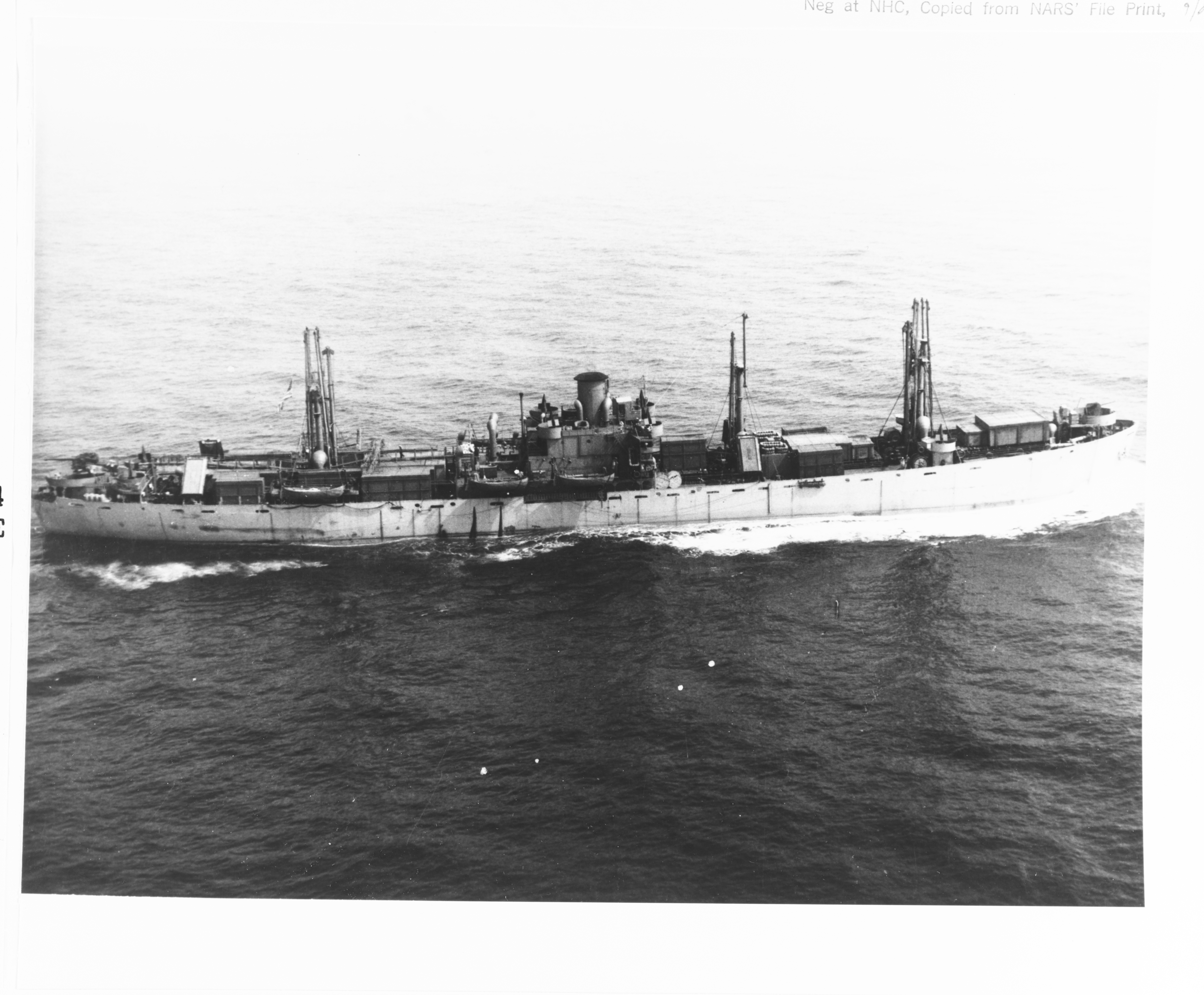
- Underway on 3 September 1943. Photographed by a ZP-14 blimp from Weeksville NAS.

History

United States
- Name: Alexander Lillington
- Namesake: Alexander Lillington
- Builder: North Carolina Shipbuilding Company, Wilmington, North Carolina
- Yard number: 47
- Way number: 2
- Laid down: 2 November 1942
- Launched: 6 December 1942
- Fate: Scrapped 1961

General characteristics
- Type: Liberty ship
- Tonnage: 7,000 long tons deadweight (DWT)
- Length: 441 ft 6 in (134.57 m)
- Beam: 56 ft 11 in (17.35 m)
- Draft: 27 ft 9 in (8.46 m)
- Propulsion: Two oil-fired boilers; Triple expansion steam engine; Single screw; 2,500 hp (1,864 kW)
- Speed: 11 knots (20 km/h; 13 mph)
- Capacity: 9,140 tons cargo
- Complement: 41
- Armament: 1 × Stern-mounted 4 in (100 mm) deck gun; AA guns

SS Alexander Lillington (MC contract 869) was a Liberty ship built in the United States during World War II. She was named after Alexander Lillington, a North Carolina Patriot militia officer who served at the Battle of Moore's Creek Bridge and the Battle of Camden.

The ship was laid down by North Carolina Shipbuilding Company in their Cape Fear River yard on November 2, 1942, and launched on December 6, 1942. Lillington was chartered to the South Atlantic Steamship Company for the War Shipping Administration until January 1947. She was operated by Waterman Steamship Corporation until December 1947. From then until January 1948 when Lillington was placed in the Wilmington Fleet of the National Defense Reserve Fleet she was chartered to Boland & Cornelius. The vessel was scrapped in 1961.
