= John J. Boland =

Shipping company owner

- Born: 1875
- Died: 1956 (aged 80–81)
- Occupation: shipping executive
- Known for: cofounded American Steamship Company

John J. Boland (1875–1956) was one of the co-founders of the American Steamship Company and Boland and Cornelius Company.

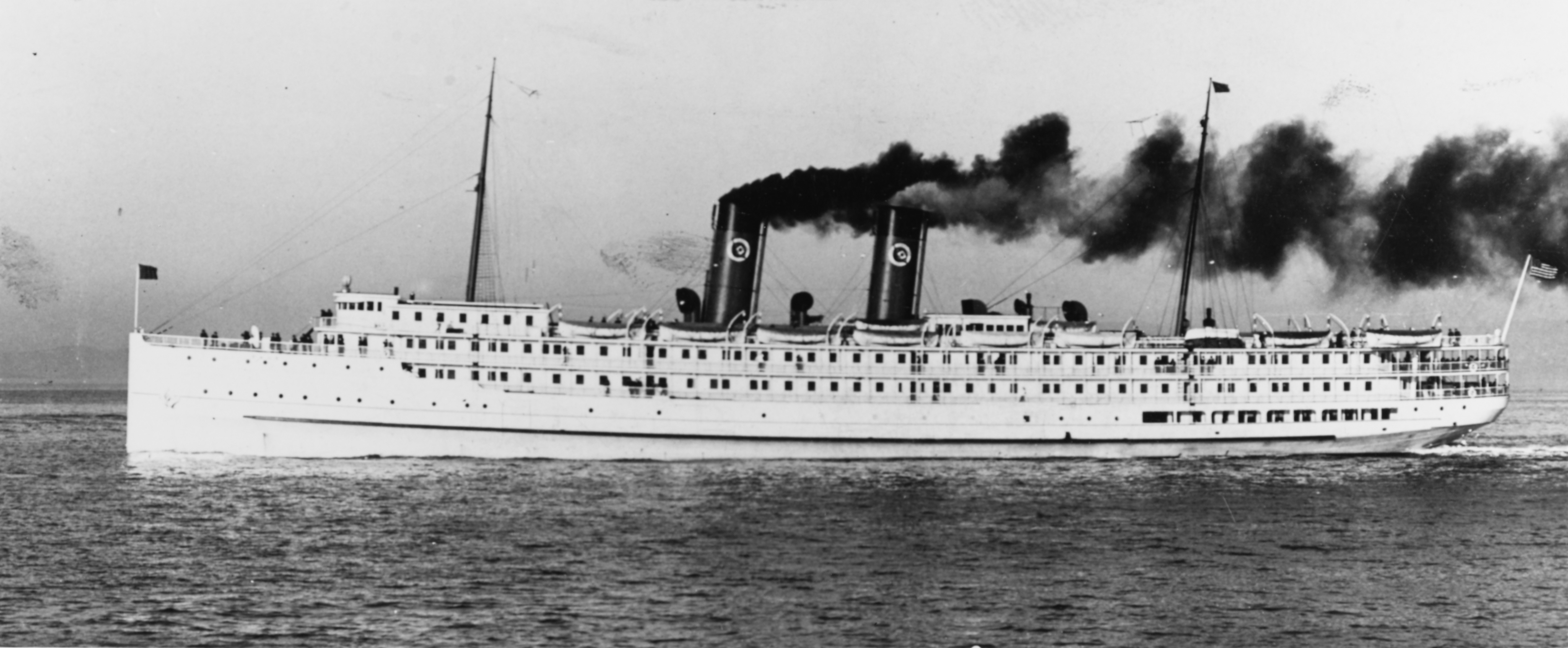
John J. Boland's first ship, the SS Yale, shown underway prior to World War I, served as USS Yale (ID-1672), 1918–1920 and as USS Greyhound (IX-106), 1943–1944.

He was the son of a Great Lakes schooner captain. At age 20, Boland formed a small shipbroking and shipping chartering business. In 1902, he hired Adam E. Cornelius to do clerical work. In 1904, Boland invited Cornelius to enter into a partnership with his firm. In 1907, Boland and Cornelius launched a company which they named the American Steamship Company. Their first vessel, the SS Yale was the first steel vessel owned by a Buffalo firm and earned large profits for the partners. Boland and Cornelius ran the American Steamship Company successfully until the Great Depression, at which point they decided to convert the company's fleet to self-unloaders. This strategy paid off. Boland's son, John J. Boland Jr. was involved with the American Steamship Company, and took over as chairman after Boland Sr. died in 1956.
