= MV Saginaw =

Lake freighter

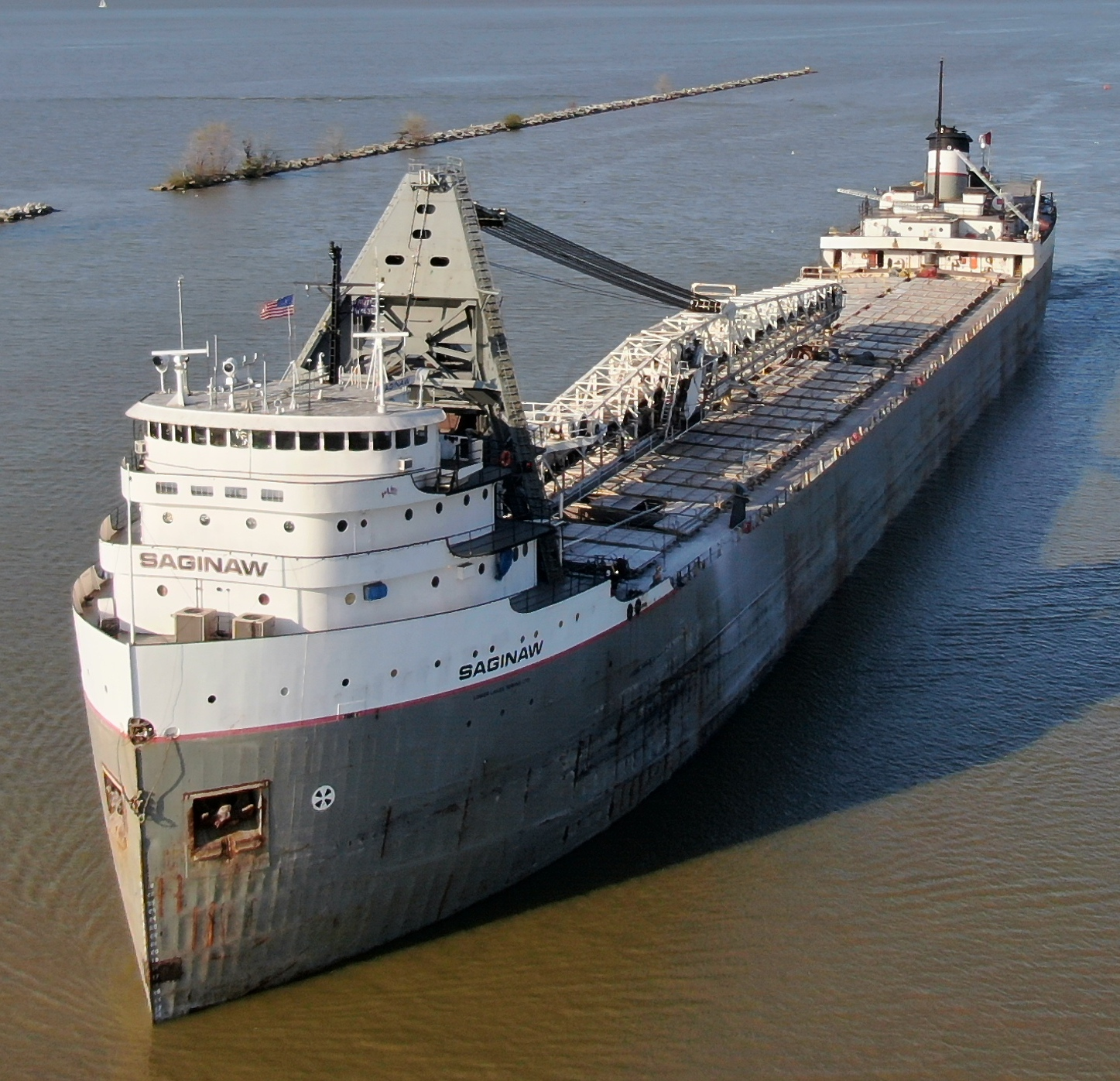
- Saginaw sailing into Sandusky, Ohio

History
- Name: John J. Boland (1953–1999); Saginaw (1999–present)
- Owner: American Steamship Company (1953–1999); Lower Lakes Towing (1999–2026); Algoma Central Corporation (2026–present)
- Builder: Manitowoc Shipbuilding Company, Manitowoc, Wisconsin
- Yard number: 417
- Launched: 9 May 1953
- Completed: September 1953
- Identification: IMO number: 5173876
- Status: In active service

General characteristics as built
- Type: Lake freighter
- Tonnage: 12,557 GRT; 19,070 DWT
- Length: 195.0 m (639 ft 9 in) oa; 189.9 m (623 ft 0 in) pp
- Beam: 22.0 m (72 ft 2 in)
- Depth: 11.0 m (36 ft 1 in)
- Installed power: 2 × Foster-Wheeler watertube boilers; De Laval cross compound steam turbine; 7,000 shp (5,200 kW)
- Propulsion: 1 × shaft; 1 × bow thruster
- Speed: 14 knots (26 km/h; 16 mph)
- Capacity: 20,525 tonnes (20,201 long tons; 22,625 short tons)

The lake freighter MV Saginaw was launched as John J. Boland in 1953, the third vessel to bear that name. John J. Boland was owned and operated by the American Steamship Company and constructed by Manitowoc Shipbuilding Company at Manitowoc, Wisconsin. In 1999, the ship was sold to Lower Lakes Towing and renamed Saginaw. The ship was later sold again and is currently in service for Algoma Central Corporation.

== Description ==
As built the lake freighter was 195.0 m (639 ft 9 in) long overall and 189.9 m (623 ft 0 in) between perpendiculars with a beam of 22.0 m (72 ft 2 in). The ship had a depth of hull of 11.0 m (36 ft 1 in) and a mid-summer draught of 8.0 m (26 ft 3 in). The ship was 12,557 gross register tons (GRT) and 19,070 tons deadweight (DWT) at construction with a capacity of 20,525 tonnes (20,201 long tons; 22,625 short tons). Using heavy fuel oil, the vessel was powered by two Foster-Wheeler water tube boilers providing steam to a De Laval cross compound steam turbine driving one shaft rated at 7,000 shaft horsepower (5,200 kW). The ship was designed for the stone trade and is equipped with a 76.20 m (250 ft 0 in) discharge boom that can be swung 120 degrees to port or starboard. The boom is used to unload the vessel's cargo.

In 1986 a 1,000 horsepower (750 kW) bow thruster was installed. In 2007, her turbine was replaced by a MaK 6M43C 6-cylinder diesel engine, generating 8,160 brake horsepower (6,080 kW). The vessel's tonnages were adjusted, with the ship being 14,066 gross register tons (GRT) and 19,390 tons deadweight (DWT).

== Construction and career ==
John J. Boland, yard number 417 was one of three self-unloading bulk carriers built by Manitowoc Shipbuilding Company at Manitowoc, Wisconsin. The vessel is notable as one of only three self-unloading ships constructed on the Great Lakes in the 1950s. Her namesake John James Boland, was a co-founder of Boland & Cornelius, the precursor to American Steamship Company, the owners and operators of the vessel. The vessel was launched on 9 May 1953 and completed in September of that year, registered in Buffalo, New York. John J. Boland was used mostly to transport stone and ore cargoes around the Great Lakes. On 16 December 1973, the vessel's boom collapsed onto the dock of the Pulliam Bay Power Plant at Green Bay, Wisconsin. Faulty support cables were determined to be the cause, and the vessel's boom was replaced in March 1974.

By the 1980s the ship had become among the oldest operated by American Steamship Company and was idle for eight years until returned to operation on 22 April 1992 when John J. Boland departed Superior, Wisconsin for Marquette, Michigan. The vessel's cabins had been remodeled and the instruments upgraded. In December 1998, John J. Boland was laid up again and the American Steamship Company did not intend to sail the vessel the following year.

In 1999, she was sold to Lower Lakes Towing, and renamed Saginaw. Two earlier vessels have been named Saginaw, after the Saginaw River. The vessel's registration was changed to Nanticoke, Ontario and the ship was taken to Government Dock at Sarnia, Ontario to undergo a refit. Upon return to service in December 1999, Saginaw now carried cargoes of stone, aggregates, coal, wheat, or salt. On 6 December 2002, Saginaw's rudder was damaged in a turn in the Welland Canal. The vessel was repaired at Heddle Marine in Hamilton, Ontario. On 4 April 2003 the bulk carrier became stuck in ice outside Marquette and was not freed until three days later by the Canadian Coast Guard icebreaker CCGS Samuel Risley.

In 2007, the ship underwent a refit that included swapping out her steam turbine for a diesel engine. The vessel returned to service in June 2008. On 31 December 2011, Saginaw suffered a second boom collapse, this time while loading coal at Thunder Bay, Ontario. The vessel was repaired at Thunder Bay before completing her journey to Sault Ste. Marie, Ontario.

In 2026, Saginaw, along with her fleetmates were acquired by Algoma Central Corporation.

== References cited ==
- Bawal, Raymond A. (2009). Twilight of the Great Lakes Steamer. Clinton Township, MI: Inland Expressions. ISBN 9780981815725. LCCN 2010278859.
- Colton, T. (June 25, 2012). "Manitowoc Shipbuilding, Manitowoc WI". ShipbuildingHistory. Archived from the original on 4 December 2013.
- "Saginaw (5173876)". Equasis. Ministry of Ecology, Sustainable Development and Energy.
- "The Lightship" (PDF). Lake Huron Lore. XXXIII (March/April 2002). Huron Marine Society, Port Huron Museum, Port Huron, MI. 2002.
- Lapinski, Patrick (Spring 1997). "Legend of a Steamer: The John J. Boland" (PDF). Inland Seas. 53 (1). Great Lakes Historical Society: 15–27.
- "John J. Boland (5173876)". Miramar Ship Index.
- Wharton, George. "Great Lakes Fleet Page Vessel Feature -- Saginaw (3)". boatnerd.com. Archived from the original on 20 September 2018.
