= Adam E. Cornelius (1908 ship) =

Great Lakes freighter

History
- Name: Adam E. Cornelius
- Namesake: Adam E. Cornelius
- Owner: American Steamship Company
- Launched: 1908
- Renamed: Detroit Edison (1948); George F. Rand (1954); Avondale (1962)
- Fate: scrapped (Spain 1979)

General characteristics
- Type: Motor Vessel
- Length: 425 ft (129.5 m)

Adam E. Cornelius, launched by the American Steamship Company, was named after one of the firm's two founding directors. The vessel was launched in 1908.

She was lengthened to 425 feet (130 m) in 1942 when she was retro-fitted with self-unloading machinery. In 1948 she was renamed the Detroit Edison, after the firm which was her primary client, and another vessel assumed the name Adam E. Cornelius. In 1954, she was renamed George F. Rand. In 1962 she was purchased by the Reoch Steamship Company, which renamed her the Avondale and was registered in Hamilton, Bermuda. In 1974 Reoch Steamship Company was reorganized as Westdale Shipping Company. The Westdale Shipping Company had moored the vessel in Port Colborne, Ontario, in 1975 after the hull was condemned. Sold to Marine Salvage Ltd. and it was there that she caught fire in 1978, set by vandals. In 1979 the hulk was towed away to Spain and scrapped.
