= List of shipwrecks in 1988 =

The list of shipwrecks in 1988 includes ships sunk, foundered, grounded, or otherwise lost during 1988.

table of contents
1988
Jan	Feb	Mar	Apr
May	Jun	Jul	Aug
Sep	Oct	Nov	Dec
Unknown date

== January ==
=== 8 January ===
List of shipwrecks: 8 January 1988
Ship	State	Description
Sierra Madre	United States	The 58-foot (17.7 m) fishing vessel sank off Cape Decision (56°00′10″N 134°08′00″W) on Kuiu Island in the Alexander Archipelago in Southeast Alaska. The fishing vessel Rachael Pauline (United States) rescued all three people on board.

=== 12 January ===
List of shipwrecks: 12 January 1988
Ship	State	Description
Cape Karluk	United States	The 32-foot (9.8 m) fishing vessel was destroyed by a storm in Geese Island Channel (56°45′N 153°53′W) at the southern end of Alaska′s Kodiak Island with the loss of all three men on board.

=== 15 January ===
List of shipwrecks: 15 January 1988
Ship	State	Description
Icy Queen	United States	The 55-foot (16.8 m) fishing vessel capsized in Meares Passage and washed ashore on the west coast of Suemez Island in the Alexander Archipelago in Southeast Alaska. Her crew of six survived. She later was salvaged.

=== 17 January ===
List of shipwrecks: 17 January 1988
Ship	State	Description
Exodus	United States	The 86-foot (26.2 m) crab-fishing vessel was destroyed by fire in the Bering Sea approximately 60 nautical miles (110 km; 69 mi) north of Dutch Harbor, Alaska.

=== 18 January ===
List of shipwrecks: 18 January 1988
Ship	State	Description
Wayward Wind	United States	The 86-foot (26.2 m) crab fishing vessel flooded and sank in the Gulf of Alaska 9 nautical miles (17 km; 10 mi) south of Tugidak Island in the Kodiak Archipelago, probably due to an improperly dogged hatch on a crab pumping tank. Four of her six crewmen died.

=== 19 January ===
List of shipwrecks: 19 January 1988
Ship	State	Description
La Dieppoise	French Navy	The decommissioned Bay-class minesweeper was sunk as an artificial reef in the lagoon at Nouméa.

=== 29 January ===
List of shipwrecks: 29 January 1988
Ship	State	Description
Rolandia	Cyprus	The cargo ship sank in the Atlantic Ocean 820 nautical miles (1,520 km) south west of Land's End, Cornwall, United Kingdom with the loss of all twelve crew.

== February ==
=== 8 February ===
List of shipwrecks: 8 February 1988
Ship	State	Description
ITL Anna B	United Kingdom	The anchor handling tug supply vessel foundered in heavy seas in a position 53.01.45N 01.32.06E, 5 nautical miles (9.3 km) from Haisboro’ light vessel, off the coast of Norfolk, England, on a voyage from Great Yarmouth to Norway. All 13 aboard were taken off liferafts by helicopter.
Simone Marguerite	Belgium	The trawler ran ashore on the Cressars Rock, Penzance, Cornwall in a SW gale after steering the wrong side of the pole. Refloated by the Penlee Lifeboat.

=== 10 February ===
List of shipwrecks: 10 February 1988
Ship	State	Description
Car Float No. 52	United States	The retired 270-foot (82.3 m) car float was scuttled as an artificial reef in the North Atlantic Ocean 3.6 nautical miles (6.7 km; 4.1 mi) off Sea Girt, New Jersey, at 40°07.135′N 073°56.919′W.

=== 12 February ===
List of shipwrecks: 12 February 1988
Ship	State	Description
USS Yorktown	United States Navy	The guided missile cruiser was deliberately rammed by the frigate Bezzavetnyy (Soviet Navy) in the Black Sea.

=== 16 February ===
List of shipwrecks: 16 February 1988
Ship	State	Description
Sol Phryne	Greece	Sunk by a limpet mine at Limassol, Cyprus. Later raised and taken to Bijela, Yugoslavia.

=== 17 February ===
List of shipwrecks: 17 February 1988
Ship	State	Description
Captain Billy	United States	The 83-foot (25.3 m) fishing trawler was wrecked on rocks on the southeast coast of Yunaska Island in the Aleutian Islands during a gale. All six members of her crew reached the beach, from which the United States Coast Guard rescued them.

=== 28 February ===
List of shipwrecks: 28 February 1988
Ship	State	Description
Alaska Star	United States	The 153-foot (46.6 m) processing vessel was wrecked during a blizzard on a rock in Nikolski Bay (52°57′30″N 168°54′00″W) 100 yards (91 m) off the coast of Umnak Island in the Aleutian Islands. The fishing vessel Neahkahnie (United States) rescued her entire crew of 15. Alaska Star rolled over and sank on 29 February.

=== 29 February ===
List of shipwrecks: 29 February 1988
Ship	State	Description
Vinca Gorthon	Sweden	The cargo ship capsized in the North Sea 12 nautical miles (22 km) off the coast of the Netherlands. All seventeen crew were rescued.

== March ==
=== 1 March ===
List of shipwrecks: 1 March 1988
Ship	State	Description
"Ocean Gain"	United Kingdom	The 20-metre (66 ft) fishing vessel sprung a leak and sank 5 miles south of Stack, Holyhead. Three of her crew taken off by helicopter, last man on board taken off by RNLI lifeboat.

=== 14 March ===
List of shipwrecks: 14 March 1988
Ship	State	Description
HQ-505	Vietnam People's Navy	Sino-Vietnamese War: Johnson South Reef Skirmish: The tank landing ship was shelled and damaged by Yingtan ( (China) People's Liberation Army Navy), later sinking.
HQ-604	Vietnam People's Navy	Sino-Vietnamese War: Johnson South Reef Skirmish: The tank landing ship was shelled and sunk by Nanchang ( (China) People's Liberation Army Navy).
HQ-605	Vietnam People's Navy	Sino-Vietnamese War: Johnson South Reef Skirmish: The tank landing ship was shelled and sunk by Xiantan ( (China) People's Liberation Army Navy).

=== 17 March ===
List of shipwrecks: 17 March 1988
Ship	State	Description
George W	United States	The 58-foot (17.7 m) fishing trawler was sighted for the last time in Uyak Bay (57°48′N 154°04′W) on the coast of Kodiak Island in Alaska′s Kodiak Archipelago. She subsequently disappeared with the loss of all three men on board. The fishing vessel Nomad (United States) found the bodies of two of them in a life raft near Sutwik Island 30 nautical miles (56 km; 35 mi) east of Chignik, Alaska, on 19 March.

=== 31 March ===
List of shipwrecks: 31 March 1988
Ship	State	Description
Haven	Cyprus	Iran–Iraq War: The supertanker was hit by an Iranian missile in the Strait of Hormuz and set on fire. Subsequently repaired and returned to service.

== April ==
=== 4 April ===
List of shipwrecks: 4 April 1988
Ship	State	Description
New Hope	United States	The 35-foot (10.7 m) fishing vessel′s crew of two abandoned her in the Gulf of Alaska off the Alaska Peninsula 8 nautical miles (15 km; 9.2 mi) north of Sutwik Island after she lost power and flooded. A United States Coast Guard helicopter rescued both crewmen. New Hope disappeared and was presumed to have sunk.

=== 8 April ===
List of shipwrecks: 8 April 1988
Ship	State	Description
Cape Cleare	United States	The 51-foot (15.5 m) longline fishing vessel sank in the Gulf of Alaska approximately 35 nautical miles (65 km; 40 mi) south of Kodiak, Alaska. Her entire crew of six survived, five of them abandoning ship in a life raft and the sixth being rescued from the water by a United States Coast Guard helicopter.

=== 10 April ===
List of shipwrecks: 10 April 1988
Ship	State	Description
Emerald Sea	United States	The hull of the 47-gross register ton, 48.5-foot (14.8 m) troller and longliner was found washed up on the beach in Icy Bay on the south-central coast of Alaska. She had not been heard from since she departed Yakutat, Alaska, on 7 April. Her entire crew of five men was lost.

=== 11 April ===
List of shipwrecks: 11 April 1988
Ship	State	Description
Linda’s Draw	United States	The 47-foot (14.3 m) longline fishing vessel capsized and sank in Icy Bay on the south-central coast of Alaska during a storm. A nearby vessel filmed the event and rescued her crew.

=== 14 April ===
List of shipwrecks: 14 April 1988
Ship	State	Description
USS Samuel B. Roberts	United States Navy	Damage to the hull of USS Samuel B. Roberts. The guided-missile frigate struck a mine and severely damaged, breaking her keel. Salvaged and repaired at a cost of $89,500,000. The attack led to Operation Praying Mantis being carried out.

=== 16 April ===
List of shipwrecks: 16 April 1988
Ship	State	Description
Unimak	United States	The 56-foot (17 m) longline fishing vessel capsized and sank in Icy Bay in Alaska. All four people aboard escaped in a life raft and were rescued.

=== 18 April ===
List of shipwrecks: 18 April 1988
Ship	State	Description
Unknown speed boat	Eritrean Liberation Front	Eritrean War of Independence: The speed boat was sunk by the Ethiopian Navy during an attack at Assab, Ethiopia.

=== 19 April ===
List of shipwrecks: 19 April 1988
Ship	State	Description
Sahand	Islamic Republic of Iran Navy	Sahand Operation Praying Mantis: The frigate was set on fire by bombs from United States Navy aircraft and a missile from the guided-missile destroyer USS Joseph Strauss (United States Navy) 10 nautical miles (19 km) in the Persian Gulf off Larak Island. Her crew abandoned ship and she burned for several hours before an explosion sank her in 660 feet (200 m) of water.

=== 24 April ===
List of shipwrecks: 24 April 1988
Ship	State	Description
USS Bonefish	United States Navy	The submarine had an on-board fire while submerged 160 nautical miles (300 km) off the coast of Florida. She surfaced and her crew abandoned with the loss of three crew members. She was towed to Charleston, South Carolina, where she was declared a constructive total loss. She was scrapped in August 1989.

=== 26 April ===
List of shipwrecks: 26 April 1988
Ship	State	Description
Reijin	Panama	Reijin The car transporter capsized in shallow water off Porto, Portugal.

=== 29 April ===
List of shipwrecks: 29 April 1988
Ship	State	Description
USS Sam Houston	United States Navy	The ballistic missile submarine ran aground on Fox Island in Washington. She later was refloated and returned to service.

== May ==
=== 14 May ===
List of shipwrecks: 14 May 1988
Ship	State	Description
Seawise Giant	Liberia	Iran–Iraq War: The tanker was struck by air-launched Iraqi Exocet missiles in the Strait of Hormuz and sank off Larak Island, Iran. Raised and repaired post-war.

=== 20 May ===
List of shipwrecks: 20 May 1988
Ship	State	Description
Korean Star	Panama	The bulk carrier dragged her anchors off Cape Cuvier, Western Australia, during a tropical cyclone and was wrecked. She broke in two shortly after grounding.

=== 24 May ===
List of shipwrecks: 24 May 1988
Ship	State	Description
Sandra J	United States	The halibut-fishing vessel sank near Cape Junken (59°55′N 148°38′W) off south-central Alaska. Another fishing vessel rescued her crew.

=== 27 May ===
List of shipwrecks: 27 May 1988
Ship	State	Description
Anna Broere	Netherlands	The chemical carrier transporting toxic Acrylonitrile was in collision with Atlantic Compass (Sweden) in the North Sea and sank with the loss of one of her twelve crew.
Rhino	United States	The retired 50-foot (15.2 m) crew boat was scuttled as an artificial reef in the North Atlantic Ocean 5.1 nautical miles (9.4 km; 5.9 mi) off Spray Beach, New Jersey, in 65 feet (20 m) of water at 39°33.693′N 074°06.123′W.

=== 30 May ===
List of shipwrecks: 30 May 1988
Ship	State	Description
Golden Venture	United States	The 85-foot (25.9 m) fishing trawler capsized and sank in the Bering Sea 7 nautical miles (13 km; 8.1 mi) north of Yunaska Island in the Aleutian Islands while making a turn with her trawl gear out. Her captain perished. The fishing vessel Hazel Lorain (United States) rescued her other three crew members from a life raft.

=== 31 May ===
List of shipwrecks: 31 May 1988
Ship	State	Description
Unknown speed boat	Eritrean Liberation Front	Eritrean War of Independence: The speed boat was sunk by an Ethiopian Navy frigate.

== June ==
=== 2 June ===
List of shipwrecks: 2 June 1988
Ship	State	Description
4th of February	Angolan Navy	Angolan Civil War: The Project 205 (NATO reporting name Osa-class) missile boat was lost due either to sabotage or UNITA action.

=== 6 June ===
List of shipwrecks: 6 June 1988
Ship	State	Description
Morania 180	United States	The retired 230-foot (70.1 m) barge was scuttled as an artificial reef in the North Atlantic Ocean 3.6 nautical miles (6.7 km; 4.1 mi) off Sea Girt, New Jersey, in 75 feet (23 m) of water at 40°06.301′N 073°57.424′W.

=== 16 June ===
List of shipwrecks: 16 June 1988
Ship	State	Description
Swiftsure	United States	The 133-foot (40.5 m) former USCG lightship sank while being towed from Newport, Oregon to Ketchikan, Alaska in 590 feet (180 m) of water.

=== 23 June ===
List of shipwrecks: 23 June 1988
Ship	State	Description
Trish	United States	After taking a large wave over her stern, the 40-foot (12.2 m) troller-gillnetter-longliner capsized off Tolstoi Point (55°40′10″N 132°23′10″W) in Clarence Strait in the Alexander Archipelago in Southeast Alaska. All three crew members abandoned ship in a life raft and were rescued by the fishing vessel Harvey-O (United States). The cutter USCGC Cape Hatteras ( United States Coast Guard) attempted to tow Trish to shallower water, but the towline parted and Trish sank in deeper water.

=== 27 June ===
List of shipwrecks: 27 June 1988
Ship	State	Description
Vagrant	United States	The 70-foot (21.3 m) longline fishing vessel was destroyed by an engine room fire and sank in the North Pacific Ocean about 90 nautical miles (170 km) west of Sitka, Alaska.

== July ==
=== 1 July ===
List of shipwrecks: 1 July 1988
Ship	State	Description
Hawaiian Princess	United States	The catcher processor was abandoned in the Bering Sea approximately 100 nautical miles (190 km; 120 mi) northwest of Dutch Harbor, Alaska. The fishing vessel Bering Sea (United States) rescued her crew of seven from a life raft. A United States Coast Guard vessel sank Hawaiian Princess′s burned-out hulk with 800 rounds of machine gun fire.

=== 2 July ===
List of shipwrecks: 2 July 1988
Ship	State	Description
Dalriada	United Kingdom	The Army Sail Training Association yacht sank after a collision with the nuclear submarine HMS Conqueror (Royal Navy) 11 miles south of the Mull of Kintyre. Her four crewmembers were rescued by the frigate HMS Battleaxe (Royal Navy).

=== 3 July ===
List of shipwrecks: 3 July 1988
Ship	State	Description
Kitti Wake	United States	The 32-foot (9.8 m) gillnet fishing vessel was destroyed by fire in Cook Inlet on the south-central coast of Alaska.

=== 4 July ===
List of shipwrecks: 4 July 1988
Ship	State	Description
Marine Maid	United States	The 32-foot (9.8 m) gillnet fishing vessel sank in Cook Inlet off Ninilchik, Alaska.
Singa Sea	Philippines	The bulk carrier broke in two and sank in the Indian Ocean, position approximately 35°00′S 106°00′E, with the loss of 19 crew.

=== 5 July ===
List of shipwrecks: 5 July 1988
Ship	State	Description
"Loch Lein"	New Zealand	The 80-foot (24 m) tug, or fishing vessel, capsized and sank in the Tasman Sea, or off Queensland, Australia. Crew rescued from life raft 5, or 7, days later and 200 miles from sinking location by a Navy helicopter.

=== 11 July ===
List of shipwrecks: 11 July 1988
Ship	State	Description
City of Poros	Greece	The cruise ship was attacked by Abu Nidal Organisation terrorists in the Saronic Gulf between Aegina and Faliro, Greece. Nine passengers were killed and 98 injured.

=== 23 July ===
List of shipwrecks: 23 July 1988
Ship	State	Description
Fujimaru	Japan	The fishing vessel was in collision with the submarine Nadashio (Japan Maritime Self-Defense Force) and sank in Tokyo Bay with the loss of 29 of the 48 people on board.
USS Jonas Ingram	United States Navy	The decommissioned Forrest Sherman-class destroyer was sunk as a target by a Mark 48 ADCAP torpedo.

=== 24 July ===
List of shipwrecks: 24 July 1988
Ship	State	Description
USS Rankin	United States Navy	The decommissioned Tolland-class attack cargo ship was sunk as an artificial reef in the Atlantic Ocean 6 nautical miles (11 km) off Stuart, Florida.

=== 25 July ===
List of shipwrecks: 25 July 1988
Ship	State	Description
Mojo	United States	The 28-foot (8.5 m) fishing vessel sank in Cameron Bay (56°43′00″N 135°16′30″W) in Southeast Alaska south of Sitka, Alaska. Her owner and operator died after the fishing vessel Sefora (United States) pulled him from the water; a United States Coast Guard helicopter rescued two other crew members.

=== 29 July ===
List of shipwrecks: 29 July 1988
Ship	State	Description
USNS Aeolus	United States Navy	The inactivated Artemis-class cable repair ship was sunk as an artificial reef in the Atlantic Ocean approximately 22 nautical miles (25 mi; 41 km) off Beaufort Inlet, North Carolina.

== August ==
=== 1 August ===
List of shipwrecks: 1 August 1988
Ship	State	Description
Kathleen Diane	United States	The 56-foot (17.1 m) fishing vessel capsized off the west coast of Dall Island in the Alexander Archipelago in Southeast Alaska after transferring her catch to a fish processing vessel. Her crew of six abandoned ship in a life raft and was rescued by another fishing vessel.
Yermon	United States	The 40-foot (12.2 m) gillnet fishing vessel sank in Cook Inlet about 12 nautical miles (22 km; 14 mi) west of Ninilchik. Alaska. Both of her crew members lost their lives.

=== 6 August ===
List of shipwrecks: 6 August 1988
Ship	State	Description
Unidentified ferry	India	An overcrowded ferry capsized in the Ganges River near Manihari, India, killing over 400 people.

=== 8 August ===
List of shipwrecks: 8 August 1988
Ship	State	Description
Windy Sea	United States	The 32-foot (9.8 m) vessel sank in the Gulf of Alaska off Spruce Island in the Kodiak Archipelago.

=== 24 August ===
List of shipwrecks: 24 August 1988
Ship	State	Description
USS Vermilion	United States Navy	The decommissioned attack cargo ship was sunk as an artificial reef in the Atlantic Ocean 40 nautical miles (46 mi; 74 km) off Georgetown, South Carolina.

=== 26 August ===
List of shipwrecks: 26 August 1988
Ship	State	Description
BAP Pacocha	Peruvian Navy	The submarine was rammed by the fishing vessel Kiowa Maru (Japan) off Callao, Peru, and sank with the loss of five members of her crew.

== September ==
=== 8 September ===
List of shipwrecks: 8 September 1988
Ship	State	Description
Loraine	United States	The 45-foot (13.7 m) fishing vessel was wrecked near Yakutat, Alaska. A United States Coast Guard helicopter rescued her crew of two.

=== 11 September ===
List of shipwrecks: 11 September 1988
Ship	State	Description
Freda	United States	The fishing vessel capsized and sank in Dixon Entrance on the border between Alaska, United States, and British Columbia, Canada.

=== 12 September ===
List of shipwrecks: 12 September 1988
Ship	State	Description
Marie L	Belgium	Sank at Howdendyke, England. Refloated on 28 September and beached, later broken up in situ.

=== 15 September ===
List of shipwrecks: 15 September 1988
Ship	State	Description
P1558	South African Navy	The decommissioned air-sea rescue launch was sunk as a gunnery target.

=== 22 September ===
List of shipwrecks: 22 September 1988
Ship	State	Description
Ocean Odyssey	United States	Blowout and fire in the North Sea with the loss of a crew member. Subsequently withdrawn from service, converted to a seaborne satellite launch vessel in 1997.

=== 26 September ===
List of shipwrecks: 26 September 1988
Ship	State	Description
Ardlough	West Germany	The coaster foundered in the Irish Sea 10 nautical miles (19 km) off Llandudno, Clwyd.

== October ==
=== 1 October ===
List of shipwrecks: 1 October 1988
Ship	State	Description
Abbondanza	United States	The 90-foot (27.4 m) fishing trawler sank without loss of life off Cape Chiniak (57°37′N 152°10′W) on the coast of Alaska′s Kodiak Island.

=== 3 October ===
List of shipwrecks: 3 October 1988
Ship	State	Description
Sarah Marie	United States	The 42-foot (12.8 m) longline fishing vessel was wrecked on rocks in Big Branch Bay (56°20′N 134°50′W) on the southwest shore of Baranof Island in the Alexander Archipelago in Southeast Alaska. Only one crewman managed to put on a survival suit; he reached shore on Beavertail Island, where a United States Coast Guard helicopter rescued him. The other three crew members died.

=== 4 October ===
List of shipwrecks: 4 October 1988
Ship	State	Description
Skylo	United States	The 42-foot (12.8 m) longline fishing vessel sank 2 nautical miles (3.7 km; 2.3 mi) south of Cape Cross (57°55′00″N 136°33′30″W) off Southeast Alaska after a set of 42-foot (13 m) waves struck her stern and swamped her. All three members of her crew abandoned ship wearing survival suits and were rescued by a United States Coast Guard helicopter.

=== 7 October ===
List of shipwrecks: 7 October 1988
Ship	State	Description
P1552	South African Navy	The air-sea rescue launch was lost when she struck a reef in Saldanha Bay off Danger Point, South Africa.

=== 8 October ===
List of shipwrecks: 8 October 1988
Ship	State	Description
HMAS Buccaneer	Royal Australian Navy	The decommissioned Attack-class patrol boat was sunk as a gunnery target.

=== 18 October ===
List of shipwrecks: 8 October 1988
Ship	State	Description
Pukeko	Egypt	The coaster caught fire off Mokha and was abandoned. Presumed foundered.

=== 20 October ===
List of shipwrecks: 20 October 1988
Ship	State	Description
C. Liun	United States	The 32-foot (9.8 m) vessel was destroyed by fire at Larsen Bay on Alaska′s Kodiak Island.

=== 21 October ===
List of shipwrecks: 21 October 1988
Ship	State	Description
Jupiter	Greece	The cruise ship collided with Adige (Italy) in the Mediterranean Sea off Piraeus and sank with the loss of two of the 591 passengers on board.

=== 24 October ===
List of shipwrecks: 24 October 1988
Ship	State	Description
Doña Marilyn	Philippines	Typhoon Ruby: The ferry sank in the Philippine Sea 300 nautical miles (560 km) south of Manila during a typhoon with the loss of 254 lives.

=== 27 October ===
List of shipwrecks: 27 October 1988
Ship	State	Description
Fatuk	Japan	After the United States Customs Service confiscated her for attempting to smuggle 2,000 pounds (907 kg) of marijuana into the United States, the 90-foot (27.4 m) longline fishing vessel was scuttled as an artificial reef in the North Atlantic Ocean 6.5 nautical miles (12.0 km; 7.5 mi) off Harvey Cedars, New Jersey, in 80 feet (24 m) of water at 39°37.609′N 074°01.037′W.

== November ==
=== 1 November ===
List of shipwrecks: 1 November 1988
Ship	State	Description
City of Seattle	United States	The 92-foot (28.0 m) crab-fishing vessel ran aground without loss of life on the north side of the western tip of Atka Island in the Aleutian Islands after her helmsman fell asleep at her wheel.

=== 2 November ===
List of shipwrecks: 2 November 1988
Ship	State	Description
Alaska Constructor	United States	The 113-foot (34.4 m) supply barge was destroyed by fire off Trading Bay (60°55′N 151°35′W) in upper Cook Inlet on the south-central coast of Alaska after a tank truck containing 3,000 US gallons (11,000 L; 2,500 imp gal) of gasoline on her deck caught fire and exploded. Her captain and engineer and the truck driver were killed; her first mate was her sole survivor. Her burned-out hulk later was towed into deeper water and scuttled by a demolition team.

=== 10 November ===
List of shipwrecks: 10 November 1988
Ship	State	Description
Odyssey	Liberia	The tanker broke in two, caught fire, and sank in the Atlantic Ocean 700 nautical miles (1,300 km) off Nova Scotia, Canada. She was on a voyage from Sullom Voe, Shetland Islands, United Kingdom, to Come by Chance, Newfoundland, Canada.

=== 14 November ===
List of shipwrecks: 14 November 1988
Ship	State	Description
Boyky	Soviet Union	The submarine chaser was driven ashore and wrecked on Skogsøya, Norway whilst being towed from Kola Bay to Ferrol, Spain for scrapping.

=== 17 November ===
List of shipwrecks: 17 November 1988
Ship	State	Description
Voyager	United States	The 81-foot (24.7 m) fishing vessel capsized and sank while at anchor in Ugak Bay on the coast of Alaska. Her five-person crew abandoned ship in survival suits and survived.

=== 20 November ===
List of shipwrecks: 20 November 1988
Ship	State	Description
Ocean Dynasty	United States	The 124-foot (37.8 m) fishing trawler sank in the Bering Sea. The fish processing ship Golden Alaska (United States) rescued her entire crew of seven.

=== 27 November ===
List of shipwrecks: 27 November 1988
Ship	State	Description
Valerie G	United States	The fishing vessel ran aground on the southwest side of Gravina Island at the head of Nehenta Bay (55°09′25″N 131°47′45″W) in the Alexander Archipelago in Southeast Alaska during a storm in the Clarence Strait with 60-knot (110 km/h) winds. She was abandoned without loss of life.

=== 29 November ===
List of shipwrecks: 29 November 1988
Ship	State	Description
Deep Sea Producer	United States	The 164-foot (50.0 m) fishing trawler sank approximately 30 nautical miles (56 km; 35 mi) west of Unimak Island in the Aleutian Islands. The fishing vessel Royal Sea (United States) rescued her entire crew of eight from a life raft.

=== 30 November ===
List of shipwrecks: 30 November 1988
Ship	State	Description
Komoros	Singapore	Hurricane Joan–Miriam: The cargo ship sank in the Bay of Bengal.
Miss In Soo	United States	The 85-foot (25.9 m) fishing vessel disappeared after her crew of four abandoned her in the Gulf of Alaska approximately 3 nautical miles (5.6 km; 3.5 mi) south-southwest of Narrow Cape (57°25′30″N 152°20′00″W) on the coast of Kodiak Island, Alaska. She presumably sank. Her crew was rescued by the fishing vessel Kristine Alaska (United States).

=== Unknown date ===
List of shipwrecks: Unknown date 1988
Ship	State	Description
Boiky	Soviet Navy	The destroyer, under tow from Murmansk to Spain for scrapping, broke her tow line and ran aground on Skogsøya in Øksnes Municipality, Norway. Work on scrapping the wreck only began in 2001, and the breaking of the wreck was then further delayed by the find of live munitions on board.
ARA Piedrabuena	Argentine Navy	The decommissioned Allen M. Sumner-class destroyer was sunk as a target by an MM38 Exocet fired by the corvette ARA Espora (Argentine Navy).

== December ==
=== 3 December ===
List of shipwrecks: 3 December 1988
Ship	State	Description
Opty	United States	The 139-foot (42.4 m) fishing vessel was wrecked without loss of life in bad weather on the northwest point of Alcan Harbor (52°43′45″N 174°04′30″E) on the northwest coast of Shemya Island in the western Aleutian Islands.

=== 5 December ===
List of shipwrecks: 5 December 1988
Ship	State	Description
Bowsprite	United Kingdom	The dredger broke in two and sank in the North Sea 15 nautical miles (28 km) north west of Nieuwpoort, West Flanders, Belgium with the loss of four of her ten crew.

=== 10 December ===
List of shipwrecks: 10 December 1988
Ship	State	Description
Aoyagi Maru	Japan	The 288-foot (87.8 m) refrigerated cargo ship lost power and ran aground without loss of life on a reef in Lost Harbor (54°13′45″N 165°36′30″W) on the west coast of Akun Island in the Aleutian Islands. Her wreck was burned in January 1989 to destroy the fuel on board.
Arctic II	United States	The 115-foot (35.1 m) fishing trawler capsized and sank in the Bering Sea approximately 55 nautical miles (102 km; 63 mi) north of Unimak Pass after a large wave struck her. Her crew of five abandoned ship on a life raft, but two of them perished when another large wave struck the raft and swept them overboard. The fishing vessel American Beauty (United States) rescued her three surviving crew members.

=== 11 December ===
List of shipwrecks: 11 December 1988
Ship	State	Description
Canadian Progress	Canada	The lake freighter ran aground on Ballard's Reef while hauling a load of coal. The ship required tugboat assistance to be freed.

=== 21 December ===
List of shipwrecks: 21 December 1988
Ship	State	Description
SAS Gelderland	South African Navy	The decommissioned Ford-class seaward defence boat was expended as a demolition target off Duiker Point, South Africa.

=== 22 December ===
List of shipwrecks: 22 December 1988
Ship	State	Description
Bon Su Mar	United States	The 186-gross ton, 90-foot (27.4 m) fishing trawler sank in the Bering Sea off Saint Paul Island. Her crew abandoned ship in a life raft and was rescued by the fishing vessel Amber Dawn (United States).

=== 23 December ===
List of shipwrecks: 23 December 1988
Ship	State	Description
		In the evening, the fishing trawler ran aground near Seaford, United Kingdom. The five Belgian sailors were rescued by the British coastguard.

=== 23 December ===
List of shipwrecks: 23 December 1988
Ship	State	Description
		The oil tanker without engine lost its anchor due to a storm. The 34 crew members were saved after five hours. The tanker served as a collection and storage facility for oil. The production of three oil fields on the British part of the North Sea came to a standstill for a long time.

=== 26 December ===
List of shipwrecks: 26 December 1988
Ship	State	Description
Baden	Honduras	The Norwegian built coastal trading vessel, sailing under the flag of Honduras was on voyage from Bergen, Norway to Antwerp, Belgium with a cargo of steel. The ship sank near Texel, the Netherlands, after the ship tilted due to shifting cargo. All crew members survived by sprinting into the water. Criticism of the rescue operation followed.
Rockey	Netherlands	The merchant ship lost its anchors and foundered on a sandbank. All crew members were able to rescue themself.

=== 27 December ===
List of shipwrecks: 27 December 1988
Ship	State	Description
Hasail	Bangladesh	The ferry collided with a tanker in foggy weather and sank in the Dhaleswari River at its confluence with the Sitalakhya River with the loss of over 200 of the 350 people on board.

=== 31 December ===
List of shipwrecks: 31 December 1988
Ship	State	Description
Bateau Mouche IV	Brazil	The tourist boat capsized and sank in the near Copacabana Beach, Rio de Janeiro with the loss of 55 of over 150 people on board.

== Unknown date ==
List of shipwrecks: Unknown Date 1988
Ship	State	Description
USCGC Unimak	United States Coast Guard	The decommissioned Casco-class cutter was scuttled as an artificial reef in the Atlantic Ocean off Virginia.
Unknown speed boats	Eritrean Liberation Front	Eritrean War of Independence: Beginning in late 1988 through 1989 eight speed boats were sunk by Ethiopian Mi-35 attack helicopters.
		A merchant ship of Panama went missing in the Japanese Sea. After it was missing for eight days, the Japanese Coast gusts started a search operation on 24 December.
