= CCGS Tracy =

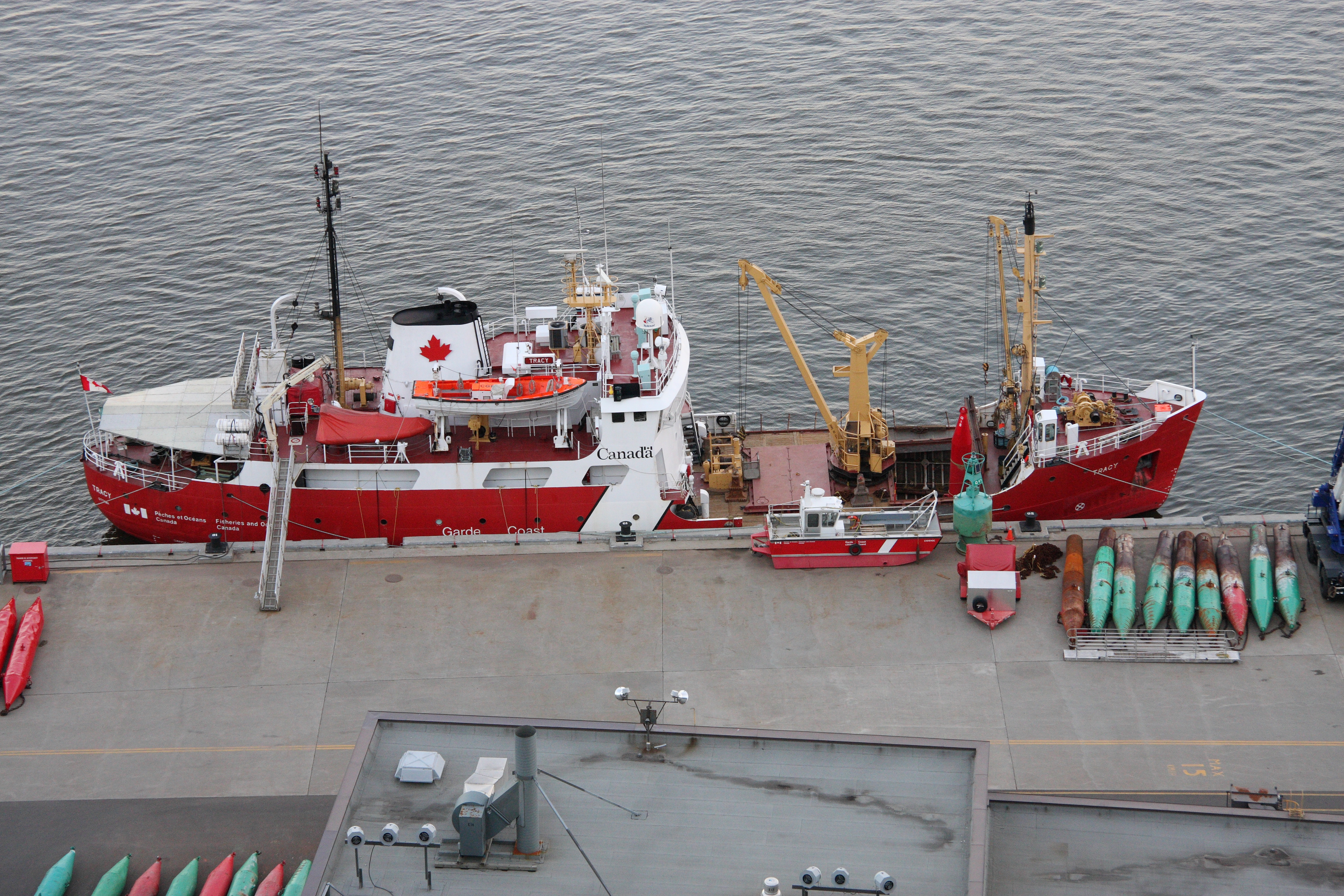
- CCGS Tracy

History

Canada
- Name: Tracy
- Owner: Government of Canada
- Operator: Canadian Coast Guard
- Port of registry: Ottawa, Ontario
- Route: St. Lawrence Seaway
- Builder: Port Weller Dry Docks, Port Weller, Ontario
- Yard number: 42
- Completed: April 1968
- In service: 17 April 1968
- Out of service: 2013
- Refit: 1989
- Home port: CCG Base Sorel, QC (Quebec Region)
- Identification: IMO number: 6725432; MMSI number: 316001510; Callsign: CGBX
- Fate: Sold to private interests

General characteristics (as built)
- Type: Marine service vessel and navigational aid tender
- Tonnage: 963 GRT
- Displacement: 1,300 t (1,300 long tons) fully loaded
- Length: 55.3 m (181 ft 5 in) oa; 50.3 m (165 ft 0 in) pp
- Beam: 11.6 m (38 ft 1 in)
- Draught: 3.7 m (12 ft 2 in)
- Ice class: Class 2
- Propulsion: 2 × Fairbanks Morse 38D8-1/8OP 8cyl diesel electric DC 1.94 MW (2,600 hp) sustained; 2 motors, 2,000 hp (1,500 kW), 2 shafts
- Speed: 13.5 knots (25.0 km/h)
- Range: 5,000 nautical miles (9,260 km) at 11 kn (20 km/h)
- Endurance: 17 days
- Complement: 23
- Sensors & processing systems: Navigational: Kelvin Hughes I-band

CCGS Tracy (Note: CCGS stands for Canadian Coast Guard Ship) was a Marine service vessel and navigational aid tender operated by the Canadian Coast Guard. Designed for service on the Great Lakes and the Saint Lawrence River, the ship joined the fleet in 1968 and was stationed at Canadian Coast Guard Base at Sorel, Quebec and serviced the Quebec Region. The vessel was taken out of service in 2013 and was sold in 2017 to private interests.

== Design and description ==
Tracy was a Marine service vessel and navigational aid tender operated by the Canadian Coast Guard. The vessel has a displacement of 1,300 tonnes (1,400 short tons) and a was initially measured as 963 gross register tons (GRT). The ship has a length overall of 55.3 metres (181 ft 5 in) and a length between perpendiculars of 50.3 metres (165 ft 0 in). Tracy has a beam of 11.6 metres (38 ft 1 in) and a draught of 3.7 metres (12 ft 2 in). The ship was later remeasured as 837 gross tonnage (GT).

The ship is powered by two Fairbanks Morse 38D8-1/8OP 8-cylinder diesel electric DC system that creates 1.94 megawatts (2,600 hp) sustained. The system powers two motors driving two shafts creating 2,000 horsepower (1,500 kW). This gives Tracy a maximum speed of 14 knots (26 km/h; 16 mph) and a range of 5,000 nautical miles (9,300 km; 5,800 mi) at 11 knots (20 km/h; 13 mph).

Tracy has a crew of 23 and has one Kelvin Hughes I-band navigational radar. She is rated as Arctic Class 2 and has an endurance of 17 days. The ship is equipped with two work boats, a RHIB and an SB barge. The ship is also equipped with a 10-ton derrick and with 560 cubic metres (20,000 cu ft) of hold space.

== Service history ==
CCGS Tracy was constructed in 1967–68 at Port Weller Dry Docks, Port Weller, Ontario, with the yard number 42. Christened by the wife of the Canadian Postmaster General Jean-Pierre Cote, Tracy was intended as a replacement for the older Coast Guard vessel, CCGS Safeguarder. The ship was completed in April 1968 and was placed in service on 17 April. The ship was named after Marquis Alexandre de Prouville de Tracy (1596–1670), a former Lieutenant General of New France. The cost for the new ship was $2.75 million.

The ship was assigned to the Laurentian region by the Canadian Coast Guard. The ship was later stationed at Canadian Coast Guard Base at Sorel, Quebec servicing the Quebec Region. A refit was performed in 1989. In 2009, the vessel underwent a $9 million refit, performed by Verreault Navigation Inc. of Quebec. The vessel was planned to be kept in service for a further ten years. However, in 2013 Tracy was taken out of service and laid up at the Coast Guard base in Prescott, Ontario. Renamed 2016-01, the vessel was put up for sale. The vessel was sold in February 2017 for $373,000 to Groupe Océan.
