= MV Cape Lambert =

Cape L-class roll-on/roll-off

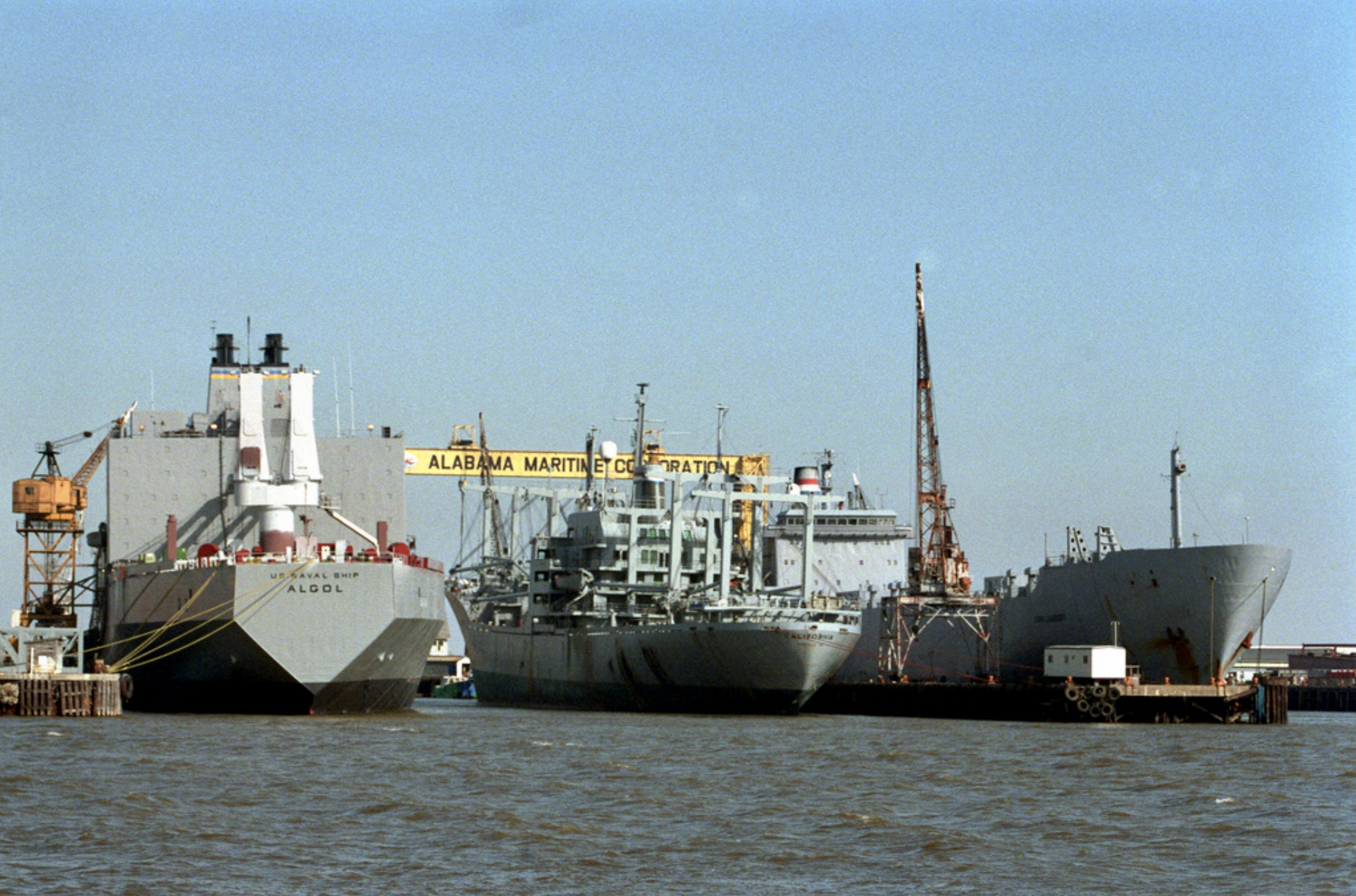
- MV Cape Lambert

History

United States
- Name: Cape Lambert
- Namesake: Cape Lambert
- Owner: Burnett Steamship Co. (1973–1985); Piute Energy & Transportation Co. (1985–1987); Department of Transportation (1987–2013)
- Operator: Military Sealift Command
- Builder: Port Weller Dry Docks
- Laid down: 1972
- Launched: 19 April 1973
- Completed: June 1973
- Acquired: 31 August 1973
- Renamed: Avon Forest (1973–1985); Federal Lake (1985–1987)
- Stricken: 2006
- Identification: IMO number: 7324390; MMSI number: 366647000; Callsign: KJCJ; Hull number: T-AKR-5077
- Fate: Scrapped, 2013

General characteristics
- Class & type: roll-on/roll-off
- Displacement: 10,557 t (10,390 long tons), light; 30,375 t (29,895 long tons), full
- Length: 682 ft 0 in (207.87 m)
- Beam: 75 ft (23 m)
- Draft: 30 ft 6 in (9.30 m)
- Depth: 58 ft 0 in (17.68 m)
- Installed power: 2 × propellers; 18,000 brake horsepower (13,000 kW)
- Propulsion: 2 × Pielstick PC2V diesel engine
- Speed: 18 knots (33 km/h; 21 mph)
- Range: 6,000 nanometres (0.00024 in) at 17.5 knots (32.4 km/h; 20.1 mph)
- Capacity: 1,250,000 cu. ft.; 2,250 vehicles
- Complement: 10 reserve; 27 operational

MV Cape Lambert (T-AKR-5077), (former MV Avon Forest), was a roll-on/roll-off ship built in 1973.

== Construction and commissioning ==
The ship was built in 1973 by Port Weller Dry Docks, St. Catharines, Ontario. She was delivered to be used by Burnett Steamship Company as MV Avon Forest on 31 August of the same year.

On 10 April 1985, she was sold to Piute Energy & Transportation Co., Cleveland as MV Federal Lake until 2 November 1987, as she would be again be sold to the Department of Transportation's Maritime Administration to be used in the Ready Reserve Force, James River Group, Virginia as MV Cape Lambert (T-AKR-5077) together with sister ship MV Cape Lobos (T-AKR-5078). She would be operated by the Military Sealift Command when activated.

On 10 August 1990, together with her sister ship were activated to transport military equipments from Bayonne to Ad Dammam, Saudi Arabia during Operation Desert Storm and Desert Shield. She would once again be deactivated in 1992. A contract of $3.4 million for the G&M Welding & Fabrication Service, Galveston from the US Navy was made on 11 August 1992, for the repair of Cape Lambert and Cape Lobos. In 1994, Cape Lambert and Cape Lobos were put into the Wilmington Reserve Fleet, North Carolina. In September 1999, she was transferred to ROS-10 status (activation within 10 days).

She would be returned to the James River Reserve Fleet and maintained by the Crowley Liner Services on 14 March 2000. Between 30 September and 9 October 2001, she would be immediately re-activated for a readiness test trial. During Operation Iraqi Freedom, Cape Lambert as re-activated from March until May 2003. From late November until December 2003, she had undergone drydocking at the Tampa Shipbuilding and Repair Company and returned to Wilmington Reserve Fleet once repairs were done.

From 22 until 25 September 2004, she would again undergo a readiness reaction test trial but in July 2006, Cape Lambert would be transferred to the Ready Reserve Fleet status and Beaumont Reserve Fleet in August 2006. Her fate would be decided in February 2009, when she was lowered to the emergency sealift status and on 30 September 2013, she began to be stripped of parts to began her disposal while in her non-retention status.

In 2006, Cape Lambert was struck from the Naval Register and later towed to Brownsville for scrap.
