= Algoma Navigator =

Bulk carrier, built in 1967 and scrapped in 2016

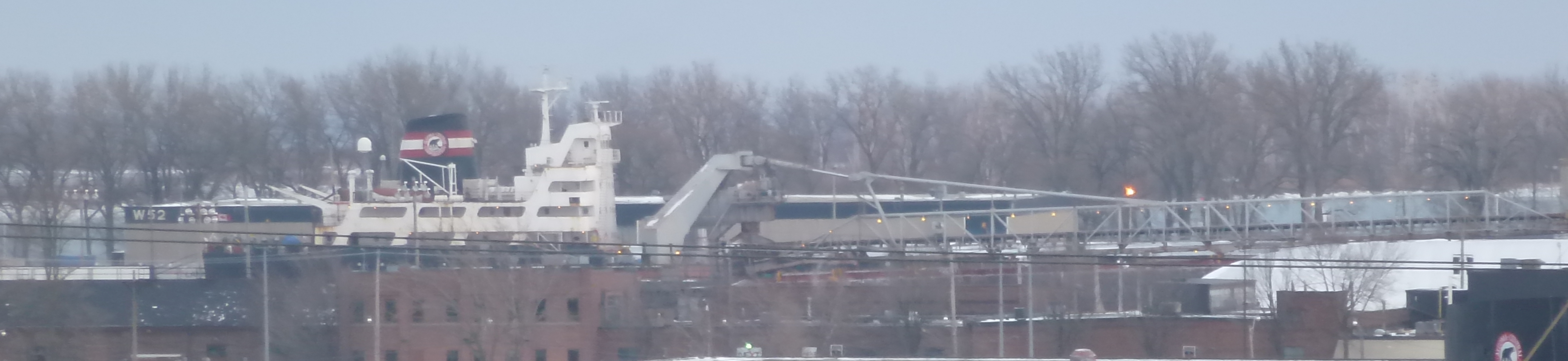
- Algoma Navigator moored in Toronto in 2014 – note her long grey self-unloading boom.

History
- Name: Demeterton (1967–1975); St. Lawrence Navigator (1975–1979); Canadian Navigator (1979–2011); Algoma Navigator (2011–2016); Navi (2016)
- Builder: John Readhead & Sons, South Shields
- Yard number: 619
- Laid down: 1 April 1966
- Launched: 26 January 1967
- Completed: May 1967
- Identification: IMO number: 6707961
- Fate: Broken up 29 June 2016

General characteristics as built
- Type: Bulk carrier
- Tonnage: 14,636 GRT; 21,105 DWT
- Length: 197.2 m (647 ft 0 in) oa; 187.5 m (615 ft 2 in) pp
- Beam: 22.9 m (75 ft 2 in)

Demeterton on the St. Lawrence River in 1974

Algoma Navigator was a Canadian bulk carrier operated by Algoma Central. Like other bulk carriers, her potential cargoes included: coal/coke, aggregates, slag, iron ore/oxides, salt, fertilizers, grain products, gypsum, quartzite, or sand. The vessel was constructed by John Readhead & Sons in the United Kingdom in 1967 for the Cambay Steamship Company and launched as Demeterton. The vessel was enlarged in 1967 and sold in 1975 to the Upper Lakes Group which renamed the ship St. Lawrence Navigator. In 1979, the vessel was renamed Canadian Navigator after a rebuild. In 2011, the ship was sold to Algoma and became Algoma Navigator. In 2016, the bulk carrier was renamed Navi before being sold for scrap and broken up in 2016.

== Description ==
The ship was initially 197.2 m (647 ft 0 in) long overall and 187.5 m (615 ft 2 in) between perpendiculars with a beam of 22.9 m (75 ft 2 in). The vessel had a gross register tonnage (GRT) of 14,636 and a deadweight tonnage (DWT) of 21,105. The ship was enlarged in 1969 with the ship being 222.2 m (729 ft 0 in) long overall and 217.6 m (713 ft 11 in) between perpendiculars with the same beam. The vessel's tonnages increased to 16,969 GRT and 25,550 DWT. In 1980, the vessel underwent another refit, with a new bow section being added. The vessel's final tonnages were 18,878 GRT and 31,769 DWT.

The ship was powered by a Doxford type 76JT4 4-cylinder diesel engine creating 9,680 horsepower (7,218 kW) driving one shaft. The ship had a maximum speed of 14.5 knots (26.9 km/h; 16.7 mph). A 1,000 hp (750 kW) bow thruster was added in the 1980 refit and self-unloading equipment was installed in 1997. The self-unloading equipment comprised a 260-foot (79 m) discharge boom fed by an elevator/gravity system that could swing 90 degrees to either side of the ship and discharged at a rate up to 4,000 tons per hour. The ship had three segregated holds of similar size.

== Service history ==
The vessel was ordered by the Cambay Steamship Company from John Readhead & Sons for construction at their shipyard in South Shields with the yard number 619. The keel was laid down on 1 April 1966 and the vessel was launched on 26 January 1967, named Demeterton and registered in Newcastle upon Tyne. Demeterton was completed in May 1967. In 1969, the Cambay Steamship Company had the vessel lengthened and the ship's capacity increased.

Demeterton was purchased by the Upper Lakes Group in 1975. The Upper Lakes Group renamed her St. Lawrence Navigator. Her registry was changed to Toronto. Her potential cargoes included: coal/coke, aggregates, slag, iron ore/oxides, salt, fertilizers, grain products, gypsum, quartzite, or sand. In 1980 Upper Lakes lengthened and rebuilt the vessel at Port Weller Dry Docks in St. Catharines, Ontario. A new bow section was added, along with a bow thruster and the vessel was expanded to the seawaymax limitations. After the rebuild she was renamed Canadian Navigator. In 1997, the ship underwent a C$15 million refit that added a boom, making her capable of self-unloading. Upper Lakes operated her from 1975 to 2011, when it sold its entire fleet to Algoma Central. After her purchase she was renamed Algoma Navigator. The vessel continued in service until 2015, when she was sold for scrap. The ship was renamed Navi and taken to Aliağa, Turkey where she was broken up by Leyal GS in June 2016.
