= Bruce Hudson =

Bruce Hudson may refer to:

- Bruce Hudson (soccer) (born 1950), American soccer forward
- Bruce Hudson (curler) (1928–2016), Canadian curler
- Bruce Hudson (ship), an oil tanker
