= MV Cape Lobos =

Cape L-class roll-on/roll-off

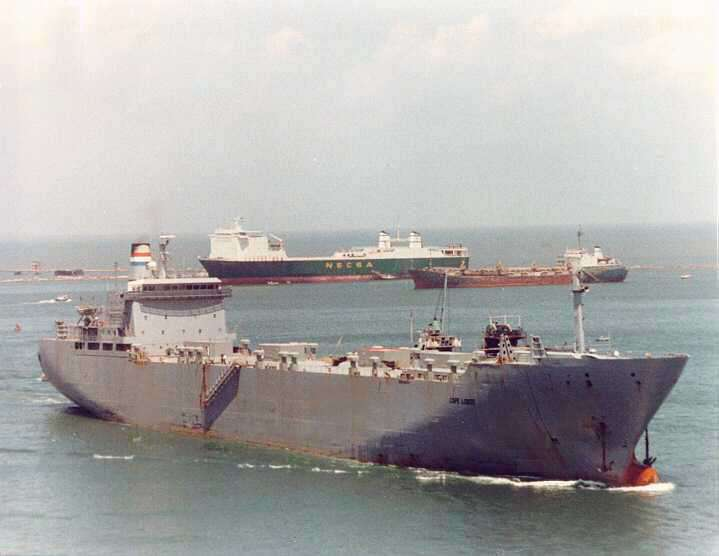
- MV Cape Lobos

History

United States
- Name: Cape Lobos
- Owner: Burnett Steamship Co. (1972–1980); Carlton Steamship Co. (1980–1985); Blackwall Shipping Corp. (1985); Piute Energy & Transportation Co. (1986–1988); Department of Transportation (1987–2013)
- Operator: Military Sealift Command
- Builder: Port Weller Dry Docks
- Yard number: 55
- Laid down: 1971
- Launched: 23 April 1972
- Completed: November 1972
- Renamed: Laurentian Forest (1972–1980); Grand Encounter (1980–1985); Laurentian Forest (1985–1986); Federal Seaway (1986-1988)
- Identification: IMO number: 7216854; Callsign: KEBA; Hull number: T-AKR-5078
- Fate: Scrapped, 2013

General characteristics
- Class & type: Cape L-class roll-on/roll-off
- Displacement: 10,557 t (10,390 long tons), light; 30,375 t (29,895 long tons), full
- Length: 682 ft 0 in (207.87 m)
- Beam: 75 ft (23 m)
- Draft: 30 ft 6 in (9.30 m)
- Depth: 58 ft 0 in (17.68 m)
- Installed power: 2 × propellers; 18,000 brake horsepower (13,000 kW)
- Propulsion: 2 × Pielstick PC2V diesel engine
- Speed: 18 knots (33 km/h; 21 mph)
- Range: 6,000 nanometres (0.00024 in) at 17.5 knots (32.4 km/h; 20.1 mph)
- Capacity: 1,250,000 cu. ft.; 2,250 vehicles
- Complement: 10 reserve; 27 operational

MV Cape Lobos (T-AKR-5078), (former MV Laurentian Forest), was a Cape L-class roll-on/roll-off built in 1972.

== Construction and commissioning ==
The ship was launched on 23 April 1972 by Port Weller Dry Docks, St. Catharines, Ontario. She was delivered to Burnett Steamship Company as Laurentian Forest in November of the same year.

Laurentian Forest was sold to Carlton Steamship Co. in 1980 and renamed Grand Encounter. In early 1985 she was sold to the Blackwall Shipping Corp. and reverted to Laurentian Forest. She became the first vessel on the scene during the recovery effort of Air India Flight 182 in June 1985. Laurentian Forest transferred 15 bodies from the wreck to a US Air Force Helicopter to be taken to Cork.

In 1986, she was sold to Piute Energy & Transportation Co., Cleveland, and named Federal Seaway until 1988, when she was then sold to the Department of Transportation's Maritime Administration to be used in the Ready Reserve Force as Cape Lobos (T-AKR-5078) together with sister ship Cape Lambert (T-AKR-5077). She would be operated by the Military Sealift Command when activated. In September 1986, 200 M1A1 Abrams were transported by the future Cape Lobos to Germany from Toledo.

On 10 August 1990, together with her sister ship, she was activated to transport military equipment from Bayonne to Ad Dammam, Saudi Arabia during Operation Desert Storm and Desert Shield. She was once again deactivated in 1992. A contract of $3.4 million for the G&M Welding & Fabrication Service, Galveston from the US Navy was made on 11 August 1992, for the repair of Cape Lambert and Cape Lobos. In 1994, Cape Lambert and Cape Lobos were put into the Wilmington Reserve Fleet, North Carolina. In February and March 1997, she made topside repairs at the Norfolk Shipbuilding and Dry Dock Corporation. Cape Lobos was lowered to the Ready Reserve Fleet in late September 1999.

During Operation Iraqi Freedom, Cape Lobos was re-activated from February until May 2003. From late November until December 2003, she underwent drydocking at the Tampa Shipbuilding and Repair Company and returned to the Wilmington Reserve Fleet once repairs were done. In May 2005 and 2006, she was towed to the North Carolina State Pier to participate in the National Maritime Day.

In July 2006, Cape Lambert was transferred to Ready Reserve Fleet status and to the Beaumont Reserve Fleet on 28 July 2006. Her fate was decided in February 2009, when she was lowered to the emergency sealift status, and on 30 September 2013 she began to be stripped of parts to began her disposal while in her non-retention status.
