= Port Weller =

Port Weller may refer to:

- Port Weller, Ontario, a community
- Port Weller Dry Docks, a shipbuilder located on the Welland Canal at the Lake Ontario entrance
