= Algoma Progress =

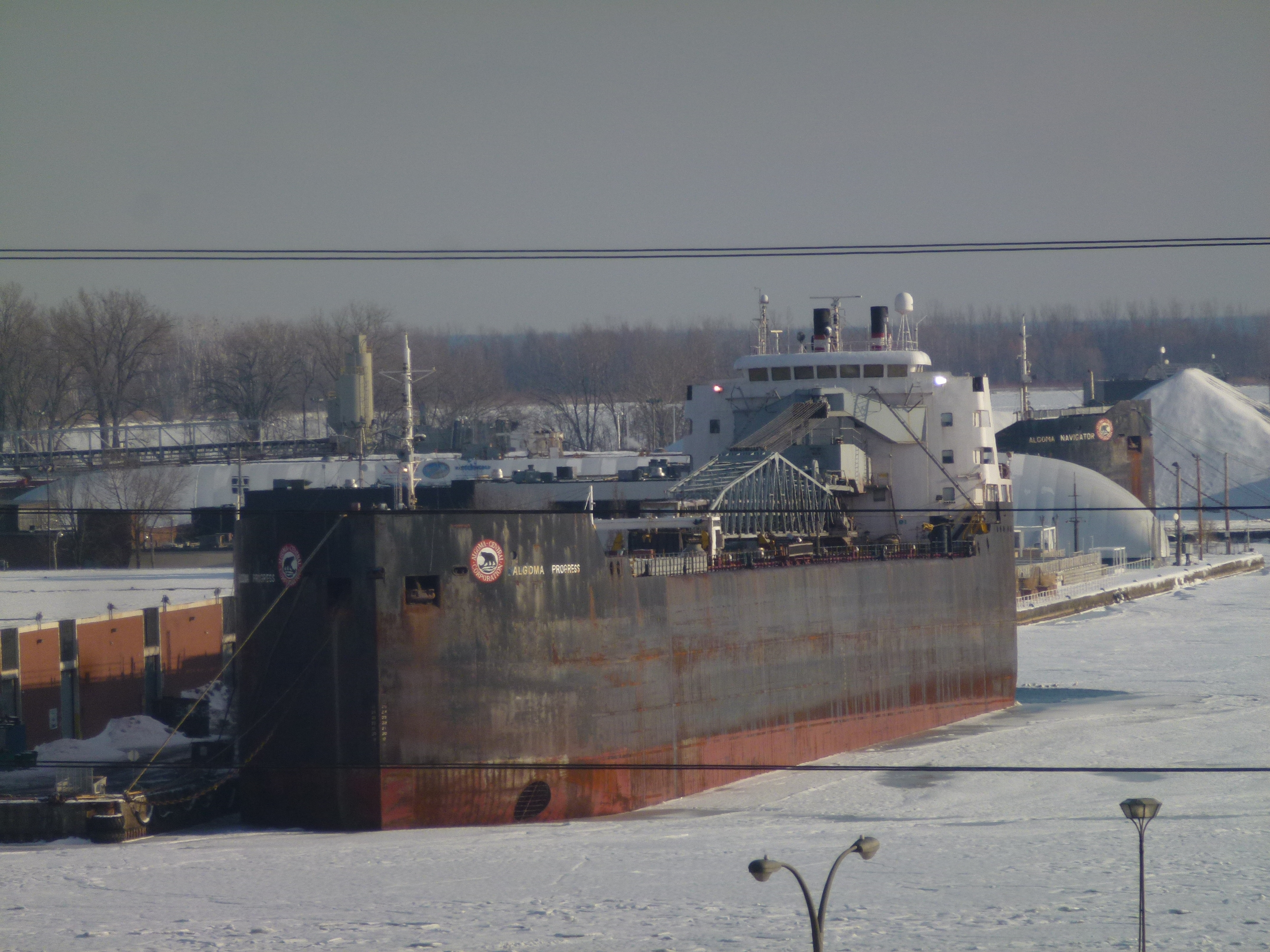
- Algoma Progress moored in frozen Toronto harbour in 2014. Note her long self-unloading boom.

History
- Name: Canadian Progress (1968–2011); Algoma Progress (2011–2014)
- Operator: Upper Lakes Shipping; Algoma Central
- Builder: Port Weller Dry Docks, St. Catharines, Ontario
- Yard number: 48
- Laid down: 5 June 1967
- Launched: 5 July 1968
- Completed: August 1968
- Identification: IMO number: 6821999
- Fate: Broken up 2014

General characteristics
- Type: Bulk carrier
- Tonnage: 21,436 GRT; 31,751 DWT
- Length: 222.5 m (730 ft 0 in) oa; 220.7 m (724 ft 1 in) pp
- Beam: 22.9 m (75 ft 2 in)
- Depth: 14.2 m (46 ft 7 in)
- Installed power: 2 × Caterpillar 3612TA V-12 cylinder diesel engines; 7,172 bhp (5,348 kW)
- Propulsion: 1 × controllable pitch propeller; 1 × 1,000 hp (746 kW) bow thruster
- Speed: 14 knots (26 km/h; 16 mph)

Algoma Progress was a self-unloading lake freighter and bulk carrier operating on the North American Great Lakes, owned by Algoma Central. Launched in 1968, the ship was originally named Canadian Progress and operated by the Upper Lakes Shipping. At launch, the ship was the largest self-unloading vessel on the Great Lakes. Canadian Progress was used to transport coal, iron ore, barley and road salt on the Great Lakes and Saint Lawrence Seaway. Canadian Progress ran aground twice, the first in 1985 and then again in 1988. In 2011, Upper Lakes Shipping sold its entire fleet to Algoma Central, which renamed the vessel Algoma Progress. In 2014, Algoma Progress was sold for scrap and broken up at Port Colborne, Ontario.

== Description ==
As built, the ship was 222.5 m (730 ft 0 in) long overall and 220.7 m (724 ft 1 in) between perpendiculars with a beam of 22.9 m (75 ft 2 in). The ship had a depth of hold of 14.2 m (46 ft 7 in). The ship had a gross register tonnage (GRT) of 21,436 and a deadweight tonnage (DWT) of 31,751. To reduce weight, the hatch covers were made of aluminum.

The ship was initially powered by two Ruston and Hornsby diesel engines each rated at 3,750 brake horsepower (2,796 kW). During a refit in 1989–1990, the bulk carrier received new engines; two Caterpillar 3612TA V-12 cylinder diesel engines with a combined rating of 7,172 bhp (5,348 kW). The engines drove one shaft turning a controllable pitch propeller and power a 1,000 hp (750 kW) bow thruster. The ship had a maximum speed of 14 knots (26 km/h; 16 mph). As a self-unloading vessel, the bulk carrier was equipped with a stern-mounted 76-metre (250 ft) discharge boom. The boom was able to swing 100 degrees to either side of the ship and could unload at a rate of up to 4,572 metric tons (4,500 long tons) per hour.

== Construction and career ==
The vessel was laid down on 5 June 1967 at Port Weller Dry Docks, St. Catharines, Ontario with the yard number 48. Canadian Progress was launched on 5 July 1968 and completed in August. At launch, Canadian Progress was the largest self-unloading vessel on the Great Lakes. The vessel was used to transport coal, iron ore, barley and road salt through the Great Lakes and the Saint Lawrence Seaway. During its career, the bulk carrier set several shipping records on the Great Lakes. On 23 April 1985, Canadian Progress ran aground 5 miles (8.0 km) east of Ogdensburg, New York in the Saint Lawrence River. The ship had been sailing to Chicago, Illinois with a load of coal. To free the ship, tugboats were required to assist Canadian Progress. In 1988, while transporting a load of coal Canadian Progress ran aground on Ballard's Reef, requiring tugboat assistance.

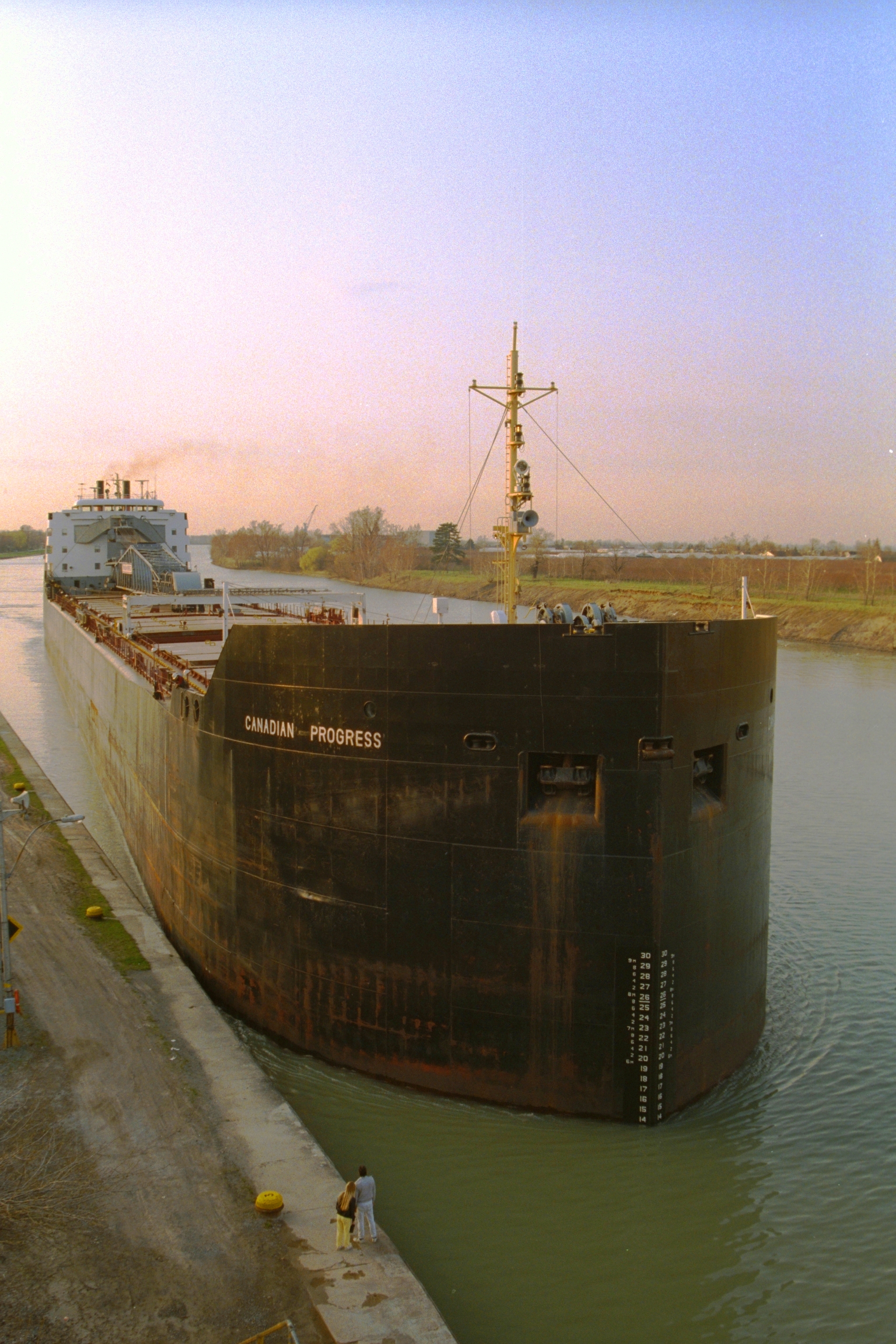
Canadian Progress near Niagara Falls, Ontario in 1993

In February 2011, Upper Lakes Shipping sold its fleet to Algoma Central. The ship was renamed Algoma Progress and officially entered service with its new owners on 31 July 2011. Algoma Progress continued in service until 2014, when Algoma Central sold the vessel to International Marine Salvage for scrap. The ship was towed to Port Colborne, Ontario where demolition was reported completed on 30 December 2014.
