= Imperial Hamilton =

Canadian marine vessel

Imperial Hamilton was an oil tanker operated by Imperial Oil on the North American Great Lakes.

On September 3, 1951, when Imperial Hamilton was moored at an Imperial Oil facility in Sarnia, Ontario, she suffered an explosion of gasoline fumes, that set the vessel afire, and injured five crew members.

The tanker Imperial Windsor was moored nearby, and according to the Sarasota Herald-Tribune, only "fast action" by her crew enabled her to escape being set alight herself. Rescued crew members were treated aboard the Imperial Windsor which had moored half a mile downstream.
