= MV Korean Star =

Bulk carrier wrecked near Cape Cuvier, Western Australia

Coordinates: 24°12′30″S 113°25′30″E

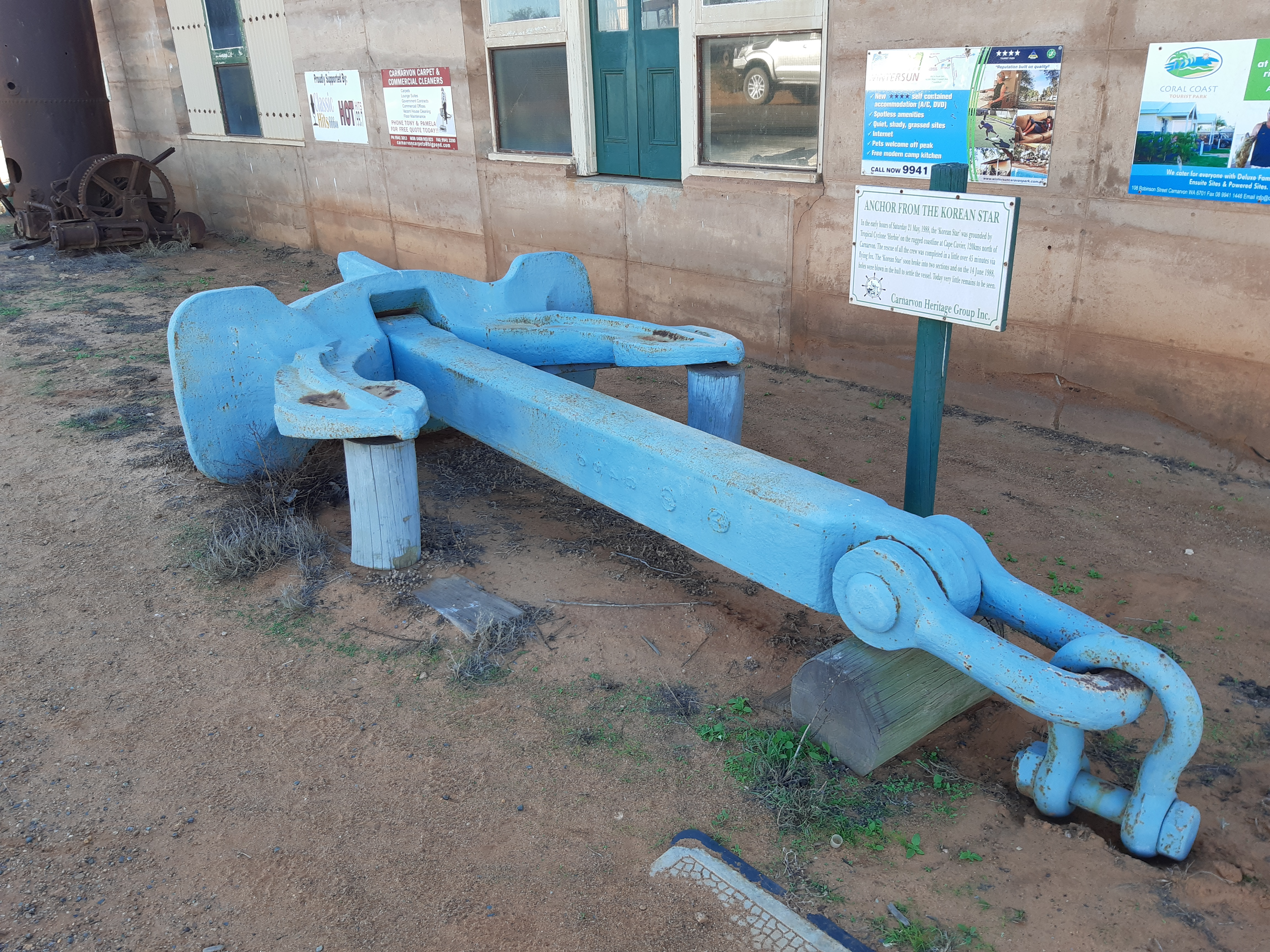
- Anchor of the MV Korean Star, on display in Carnavon, Western Australia

History
- Name: Korean Star
- Owner: Green Spanker Shipping, S A
- Port of registry: Panama
- Launched: 27 April 1984
- Identification: IMO number: 8313403
- Fate: Wrecked on 20 May 1988.

General characteristics
- Type: Bulk carrier
- Tonnage: 10,508 net; 18,639 gross; 30,900 dwt
- Length: 174 m (571 ft)
- Beam: 26 m (85 ft)
- Draft: 10.6 m (35 ft)
- Propulsion: Single screw

The MV Korean Star was a bulk carrier, built in 1984, that was wrecked on 20 May 1988 near Cape Cuvier, Western Australia.

== Fate ==
The Korean Star sailed from Hong Kong on 11 May 1988 in ballast with 19 crew aboard, en route to load salt from Lake MacLeod. While anchored off Cape Cuvier, she dragged her anchors as a result of cyclonic weather conditions associated with Cyclone Herbie and was wrecked on 20 May 1988.

The vessel was declared a constructive total loss after it broke in two shortly after grounding. The remains are found only 56 metres (184 ft) off shore at the base of a cliff within the boundaries of Quobba Station.

== See also ==
List of shipwrecks in 1988
