= Windsolite =

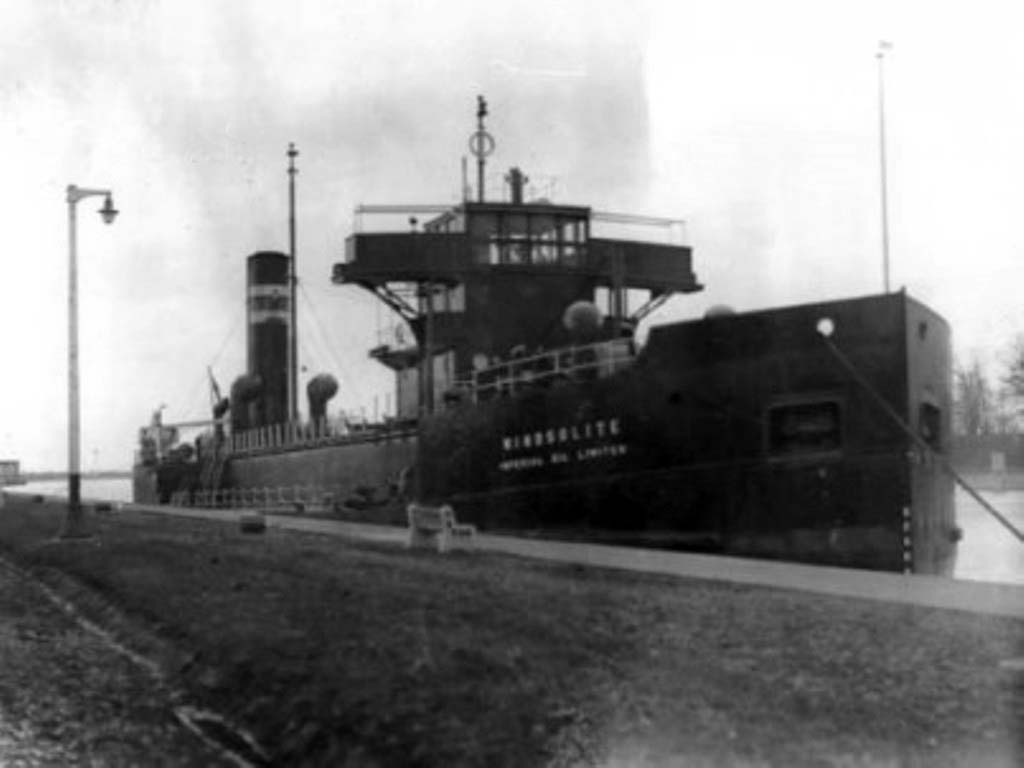
- Windsolite transiting the Welland Canal in 1936.

History

Canada
- Name: Windsolite (1927-1947); Imperial Windsor (1947-1973); Cardinal (1973-1974)
- Owner: Imperial Oil
- Builder: Port Weller Dry Docks, Port Weller
- Launched: 1927
- Fate: Scrapped in 1974

General characteristics
- Class & type: Oil tanker
- Length: 256 feet (78 m)
- Beam: 43 feet (13 m)
- Depth: 18 feet (5.5 m)
- Installed power: 750 indicated horsepower (560 kW)
- Capacity: 21,500 imperial barrels (3,520 kl); 1930 gross registered tonnes; 1196 net registered tonnes

Windsolite was a small oil tanker launched in 1927. Her service was on the North American Great Lakes. She was operated by Imperial Oil.

In his memoirs Sow's Ear to Silk Purse James Edward Blake Graham describes serving aboard Windsolite during the Second World War when experienced mariners were serving on Atlantic convoys, leaving their positions to be filled by inexperienced young farm-boys like himself. According to Graham the vessel required a crew of approximately thirty seamen to staff two watches. He wrote that the crew served six hour watches, six hours on, six hours off.

She was renamed Imperial Windsor in 1947. She was laid up in 1971, sold in 1973 and scrapped in 1974.

Imperial Windsor was moored near another member of Imperial Oil's fleet in September 1951, when Imperial Hamilton suffered an explosion and serious fire that injured six of her crew members. Imperial Windsor was at risk of being set afire herself.

In his memoirs, My Life on Earth and Elsewhere, R. Murray Schafer described the nine months he spent serving as a novice deckhand aboard Imperial Windsor in 1955. During his time aboard the crew served two 4-hour shifts per day. Schafer described the continuous hard work of transiting the smaller locks on the St Lawrence River that preceded the St Lawrence Seaway. Schafer described how, even though she was flat-bottomed, and unsuited to ocean travel, the vessel made occasional trips to ports on the Atlantic seaboard.

After she was sold in 1973, while traveling light in the Pelee passage, the vessel, which had recently been renamed Cardinal was struck by the larger and older lake freighter Henry Steinbrenner. Henry Steinbrenner was not extensively damaged, but the damage to Cardinal was deemed sufficient to write off the vessel.
