= Cyclone Herbie =

Category 1 Australian region cyclone in 1988

Tropical Cyclone Herbie
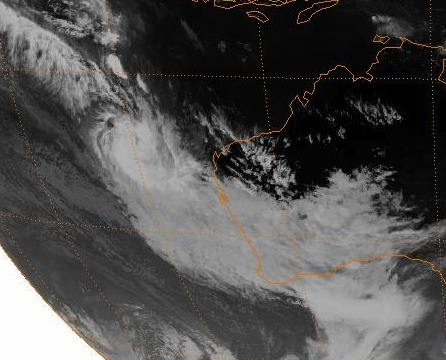
- Cyclone Herbie approaching Western Australia on 20 May

Meteorological history
- Formed: 17 May 1988
- Extratropical: 19 May 1988
- Dissipated: 21 May 1988

Category 1 tropical cyclone
- 10-minute sustained (BOM)
- Highest winds: 75 km/h (45 mph)
- Highest gusts: 120 km/h (75 mph)
- Lowest pressure: 990 hPa (mbar); 29.23 inHg

Tropical storm
- 1-minute sustained (SSHWS/JTWC)
- Highest winds: 65 km/h (40 mph)
- Lowest pressure: 995 hPa (mbar); 29.38 inHg

Overall effects
- Fatalities: None
- Damage: $15.6 million (1988 USD)
- Areas affected: Western Australia
- IBTrACS
- Part of the 1987–88 Australian region cyclone season

Tropical Cyclone Herbie was the only known tropical system to impact Western Australia during the month of May on record. The final cyclone of the 1987–88 Australian region cyclone season, Herbie was first identified northwest of the Cocos Islands on 17 May. The following day, the system was classified as a tropical low by the Australian Bureau of Meteorology and intensified into a Category 1 cyclone later that day. Several hours after this upgrade, the storm attained its initial peak intensity with winds of 75 km/h (45 mph 10-minute sustained). Around the same time, the Joint Typhoon Warning Center classified Herbie as Tropical Storm 21S.

On 19 May, the cyclone formed a new low-pressure center and relocated roughly 300 km (190 mi) south. Shortly thereafter, the storm began to accelerate towards the southeast and started to undergo an extratropical transition. Early on 21 May, Herbie made landfall in Shark Bay before losing its identity the following day over the Great Australian Bight. Although a weak storm, Herbie brought flooding rains and severe dust storms to portions of Western Australia. Additionally, a 30,000 ton freighter broke in half amidst rough seas produced by the storm. Total losses from the storm reached A$20 million (US$15.6 million). Due to the significant damage wrought by Herbie, the name was retired following its use.

== Meteorological history ==
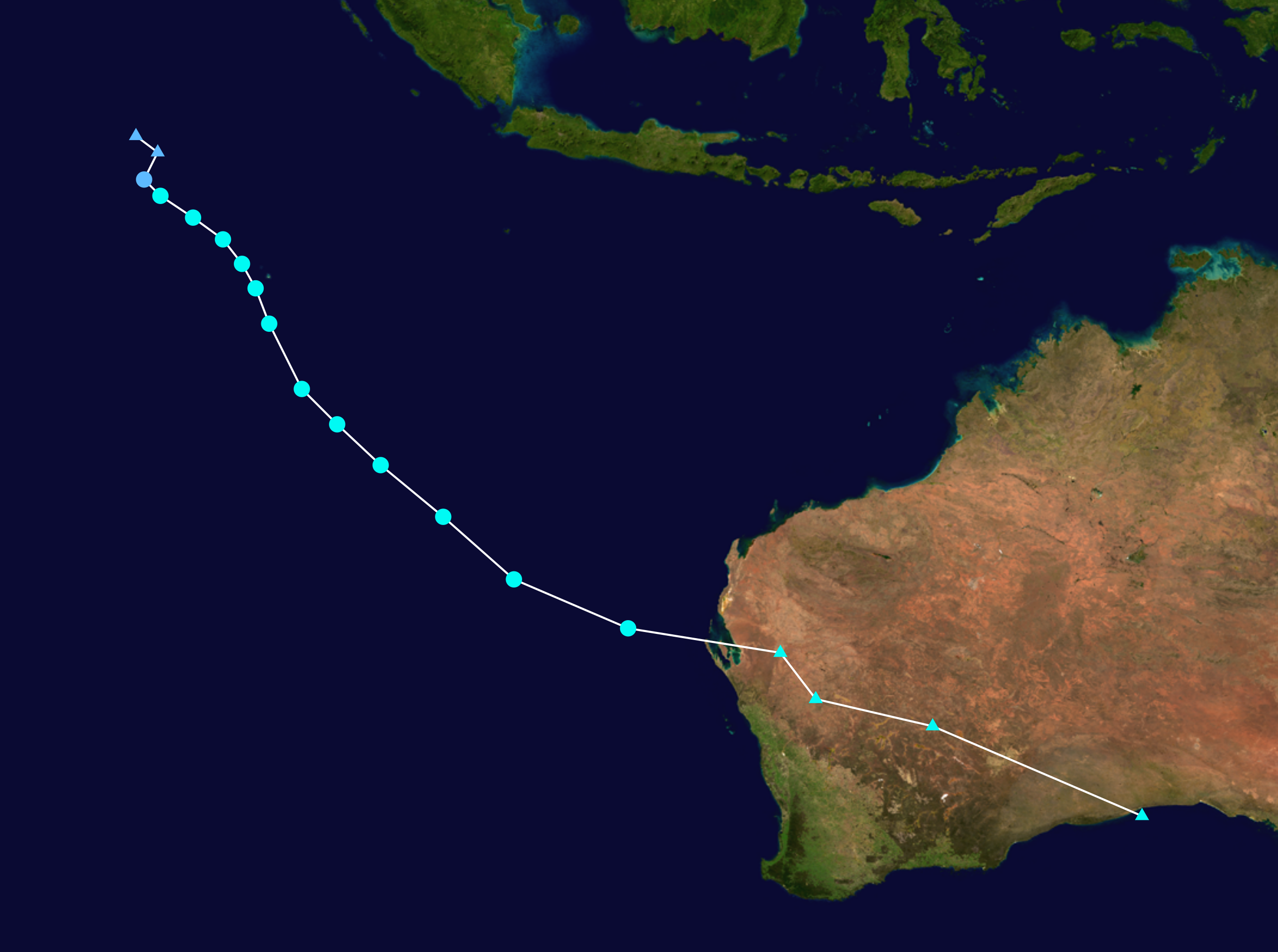
Map plotting the storm's track and intensity, according to the Saffir–Simpson scale Map key Saffir–Simpson scale Tropical depression (≤38 mph, ≤62 km/h) Tropical storm (39–73 mph, 63–118 km/h) Category 1 (74–95 mph, 119–153 km/h) Category 2 (96–110 mph, 154–177 km/h) Category 3 (111–129 mph, 178–208 km/h) Category 4 (130–156 mph, 209–251 km/h) Category 5 (≥157 mph, ≥252 km/h) Unknown Storm type Tropical cyclone Subtropical cyclone Extratropical cyclone, remnant low, tropical disturbance, or monsoon depression

Tropical Cyclone Herbie originated from an area of low pressure on 17 May 1988 northwest of the Cocos Islands. Later that day, the Australian Bureau of Meteorology began monitoring the system as a tropical low. Several hours after, the Joint Typhoon Warning Center (JTWC) classified the system as Tropical Depression 21S, having attained winds of 45 km/h (30 mph 1-minute sustained). Following slight development, the system intensified into a Category 1 cyclone and was given the name Herbie by the Australian Bureau of Meteorology early on 18 May. Several hours after being named, the storm attained its initial peak intensity with winds of 75 km/h (45 mph 10-minute sustained) and a barometric pressure of 990 hPa (mbar).

Around the same time, the JTWC upgraded the system to a tropical storm, estimating the cyclone to have attained peak winds of 65 km/h (40 mph 1-minute sustained). On 19 May, satellite imagery of the system depicted that a new low pressure centre had developed roughly 300 km (190 mi) south of the original low. Several hours after the relocation, the JTWC downgraded Herbie to a tropical depression as the system's movement began to accelerate towards the southeast. As the storm moved at a rapid speed towards the coastline of Western Australia, it began to undergo an extratropical transition. During a 24-hour period (20–21 May) Herbie tracked roughly 1,500 km (930 mi), with the movement of the storm reaching 70 km/h (43 mph) at times.

Late on 20 May, the JTWC ceased advisories on the system as it weakened below tropical depression status offshore. However, the Bureau of Meteorology continued to monitor the system. Early on 21 May, the center of Herbie made landfall in Shark Bay with wind gusts up to 120 km/h (75 mph) and a pressure of 980 hPa (mbar). Due to the rapid movement of the storm, it reached the Great Australian Bight while retaining tropical characteristics despite its low-latitude. Early on 22 May, the system lost its identity south of Australia as an extratropical cyclone.

== Impact ==
Although a weak storm, its fast approach allowed for little preparation. According to officials in the coastal town of Denham, "..the cyclone struck virtually without warning." Most tourists staying in the region evacuated the day before Herbie's arrival. Herbie caused moderate structural damage across Western Australia in coastal areas between Carnarvon and Denham. Banana plantations within this area also sustained extensive damage. In Denham, a storm surge of 2 m (6.6 ft) broke the town's retaining wall and flooded low-lying areas along the shore. Several fishing vessels were brought inland by the surge and left beached on streets once the water subsided. About 15 homes in Denham lost their roofs after wind gusts estimated at 160 km/h (99 mph) battered the town. Due to the storms extratropical transition, areas south of Herbie received moderate to heavy rainfall while areas north of the center reported severe dust storms fueled by the cyclone's high winds. Most areas affected by the storms rain recorded around 50 mm (2.0 in) with isolated totals near 100 mm (3.9 in). The Irwin and Greenough Rivers overflowed their banks, inundating parts of Dongara. In all, the storm wrought approximately A$20 million worth of structural and agricultural damage in Western Australia.

Offshore, a 30,000 ton freighter, the MV Korean Star, sustained extreme damage during the storm. Rough seas caused the hull of the ship to break and the vessel was separated into two pieces. Although the freighter was in two pieces, the ship did not sink and the wreckage of it came ashore near Cape Cuvier. No one on the ship sustained injury as all 19 crew members abandoned ship. The crew was rescued within a day of sustaining the damage and flown to Carnarvon.

In the wake of the storm, the town hall in Denham was converted into a temporary shelter for the homeless. Repair to damaged roofs and downed power lines began on 22 May. Within a few days of the storm's passage, appeals were made for relief funds in regions affected by Herbie. Although the storm caused relatively little damage, the name Herbie was retired following its usage and will never be used again to name a tropical cyclone in the Australian region.
