= Sutwik Island =

Island in Alaska, United States

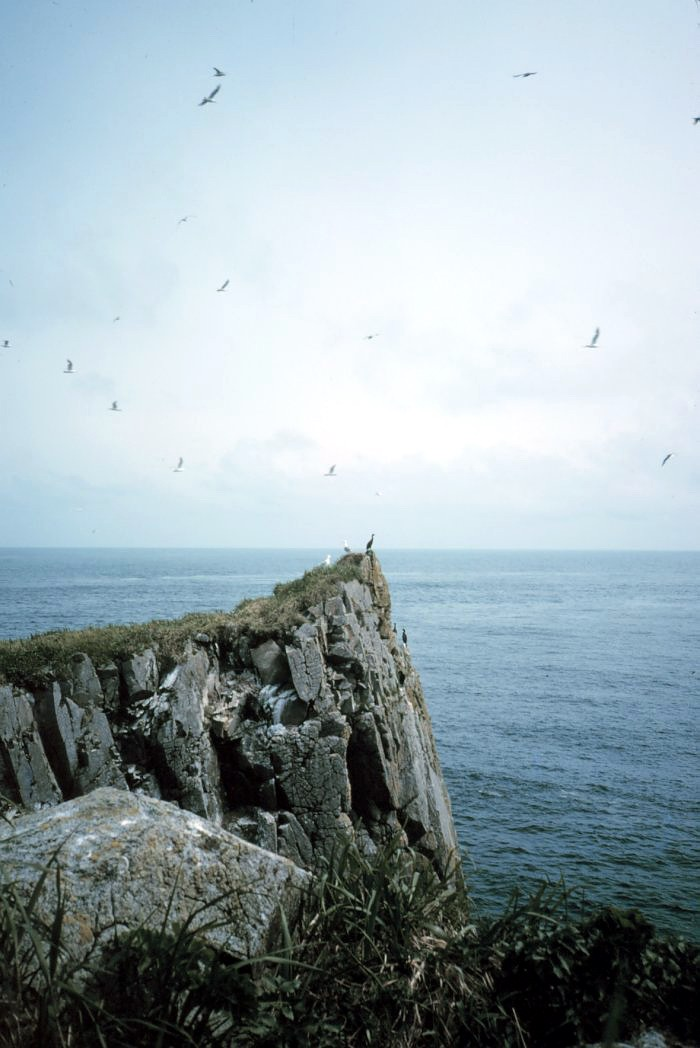
Promontory on Sutwik Island

Sutwik Island is a 14-mile-long (23-kilometer) island in the U.S. state of Alaska, located at 56°33′26″N 157°10′09″W off the Alaska Peninsula, east of Chignik Bay. It is part of Lake and Peninsula Borough, and the Alaska Peninsula unit of the Alaska Maritime National Wildlife Refuge.
