= Manihari Ghat ferry disaster =

1988 maritime disaster

The Manihari Ghat ferry disaster occurred on 6 August 1988 in the Indian state of Bihar when an overcrowded ferry carrying pilgrims across the Ganges capsized as it reached the middle of the river near Manihari Ghat (near the town of Manihari), killing over 400 people.
