= MV Singa Sea =

Bulk carrier that sank in 1988

Coordinates: 35°S 106°E

The Singa Sea was a bulk carrier which sank en route from Bunbury, Western Australia to Rotterdam via Cape Town in 1988, with the loss of 19 crew members. The disaster was notable for the long survival period of its remaining six crew, who remained adrift in the Indian Ocean for 29 days after the sinking before being rescued by a passing ship.
