= Bruce Hudson (ship) =

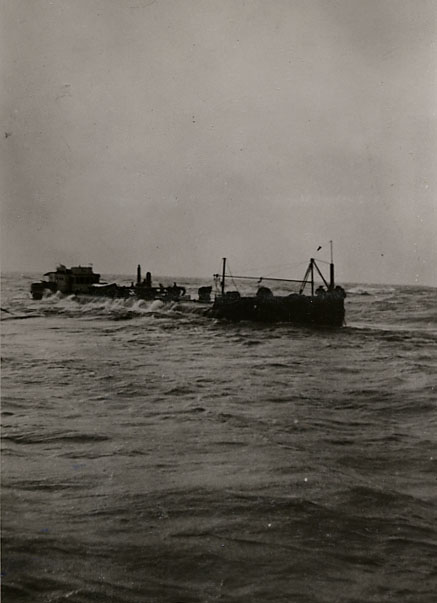
- The barge-tanker Bruce Hudson was left adrift on Lake Erie when the tug Ethel ran out of fuel.

History
- Name: Bruce Hudson later Coastal Cliff, Witcroix
- Builder: Horton Steel Works, Fort Erie
- In service: 1935
- Identification: Canadian registry #158658
- Fate: Scrapped 1983

General characteristics
- Type: steel tank barge
- Tonnage: 452; increased to 753 in 1939; increased to 1,071 in 1947; increased to 1,319 in 1957
- Length: 164.2 ft (50 m); lengthened to 172 ft (52 m) in 1939; lengthened to 212.7 ft (65 m) in 1947; lengthened to 205.3 ft (63 m) in 1957
- Beam: 30 ft (9 m)
- Decks: 1
- Installed power: barge, converted to oil-fired boilers 1939; converted to diesel engines in 1957
- Propulsion: twin propellers

Bruce Hudson was an oil tanker which mainly carried petroleum products on the North American Great Lakes. She was built in 1935 by the Horton Steel Works Ltd. of Fort Erie. Originally Bruce Hudson, and sister ships, were unpowered tank barges, that relied on tugboats to tow them from port to port. This did not prove very workable. In July, 1935, Bruce Hudson capsized in high seas off Cobourg, Ontario, while being towed from Montreal to Port Credit, Ontario, with a load of crude oil. She was towed upside-down to St. Catharines, Ontario, siphoned out, righted, and returned to service. In November 1935, the crew of Bruce Hudson were removed from the barge in high seas, again off Cobourg, when the tug Ethel ran low on fuel and had to leave the vessel adrift on Lake Ontario. The steamer Brulin took the barge in tow and won salvage fees in Exchequer Court of Canada.

In 1939 the vessel underwent the first of several refits. She was lengthened and had a pair of used engines added.

On 26 July 1943, while preparing to ship a highly volatile petroleum product called casinghead gas from East Chicago, Indiana, Bruce Hudson cargo exploded—sending flames shooting hundreds of feet in the air. Her Captain, his son, and two other crew members were burned, and later died of their burns. Despite heavy damage to her superstructure, Bruce Hudson was repaired and returned to service.

In 1947, Bruce Hudson underwent a second refit, being lengthened and deepened in St. Catharines.

In 1948, Bruce Hudson was sold to Transit Tankers & Terminals Ltd. of Montreal.

In August, 1951, Bruce Hudson ran aground at Wellesley Island, New York, in the Thousand Islands archipelago in the Saint Lawrence River.

In 1952, Bruce Hudson was sold to Coastalake Tankers Ltd. and renamed Coastal Cliff.

In 1957, Coastal Cliff underwent a third refit, being lengthened and re-engined in Montreal.

In 1969 Coastal Cliff was sold to West Indies Transport and renamed Witcroix.

In 1983, Witcroix was scrapped at Cartagena, Colombia.
