= Port Weller Dry Docks =

Former shipyard in Ontario, Canada

Coordinates: 43.21616°N 79.20806°W

Port Weller Dry Docks was a shipbuilder on the Welland Canal at the Lake Ontario entrance. The shipbuilder was founded in 1946 and the site was initially owned by the Government of Canada for storage purchases. The shipyard expanded to include ship repair, and reconstruction work. In 1956, the drydock was sold to the Upper Lakes Shipping Company, which began the construction of vessels at the site. The shipyard twice went insolvent, most recently in 2015. Port Weller Dry Docks was used to build, refit and repair cargo vessels.

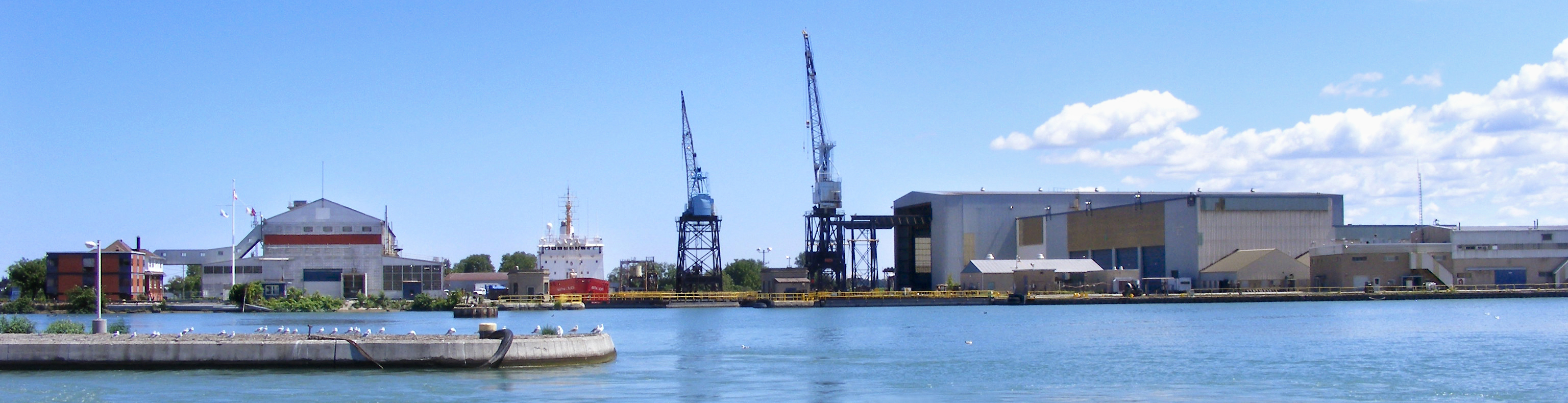
Port Weller Dry Docks viewed from across the Welland Canal in 2010

== History ==
Following the boom of shipbuilding on the Great Lakes during the Second World War, the Muir Dry Dock was closed down at Port Dalhousie, Ontario and operations were moved to the east side of the Welland Canal at Port Weller, Ontario in 1946. The drydock, opened in 1947, was initially owned by the Government of Canada and was used to store gates, lock valves, and gate-lifting vessels. The new site was considered an improvement over the Muir Dry Dock due to its location above Lock 1, which eliminated the need for pumps to fill or empty the dry dock. The yard was expanded to include ship repair and reconstruction work and employed 500 by 1950. In 1956, the yard was sold to the Upper Lakes Shipping Company. Under their management, the shipyard began to construct vessels of different types, such as bulk carriers, tankers, tugboats, scows, barges, car ferries and icebreakers. The Port Weller Dry Docks expanded its activities with the opening of the Saint Lawrence Seaway in the late 1950s. By the 1990s, the Port Weller Dry Docks was the lone Great Lakes shipyard in operation in Canada.

It was sold to Canadian Shipbuilding & Engineering Ltd. but later became insolvent. The shipyard was reacquired by Upper Lakes Group in 2007, along with a dockyard in Thunder Bay, Ontario. The company reorganized the shipyards, and other endeavours in Hamilton and Port Colborne, Ontario into a new division named Seaway Marine & Industrial Incorporated. They renamed the facility Seaway Marine and Industrial Limited, but the firm went bankrupt in 2013, resulting in the closure of the shipyard and loss of jobs. The yard was used briefly in 2015 by Algoma Central to perform maintenance work on self-unloading bulk carrier Algoma Enterprise and was leased by Saint Lawrence Seaway (current owner of the facility). The site is operated by Heddle Marine (now Ontario Shipyards) on behalf of St. Lawrence Seaway. In 2017, Cuyahoga arrived to overwinter at the site.

== Ships ==
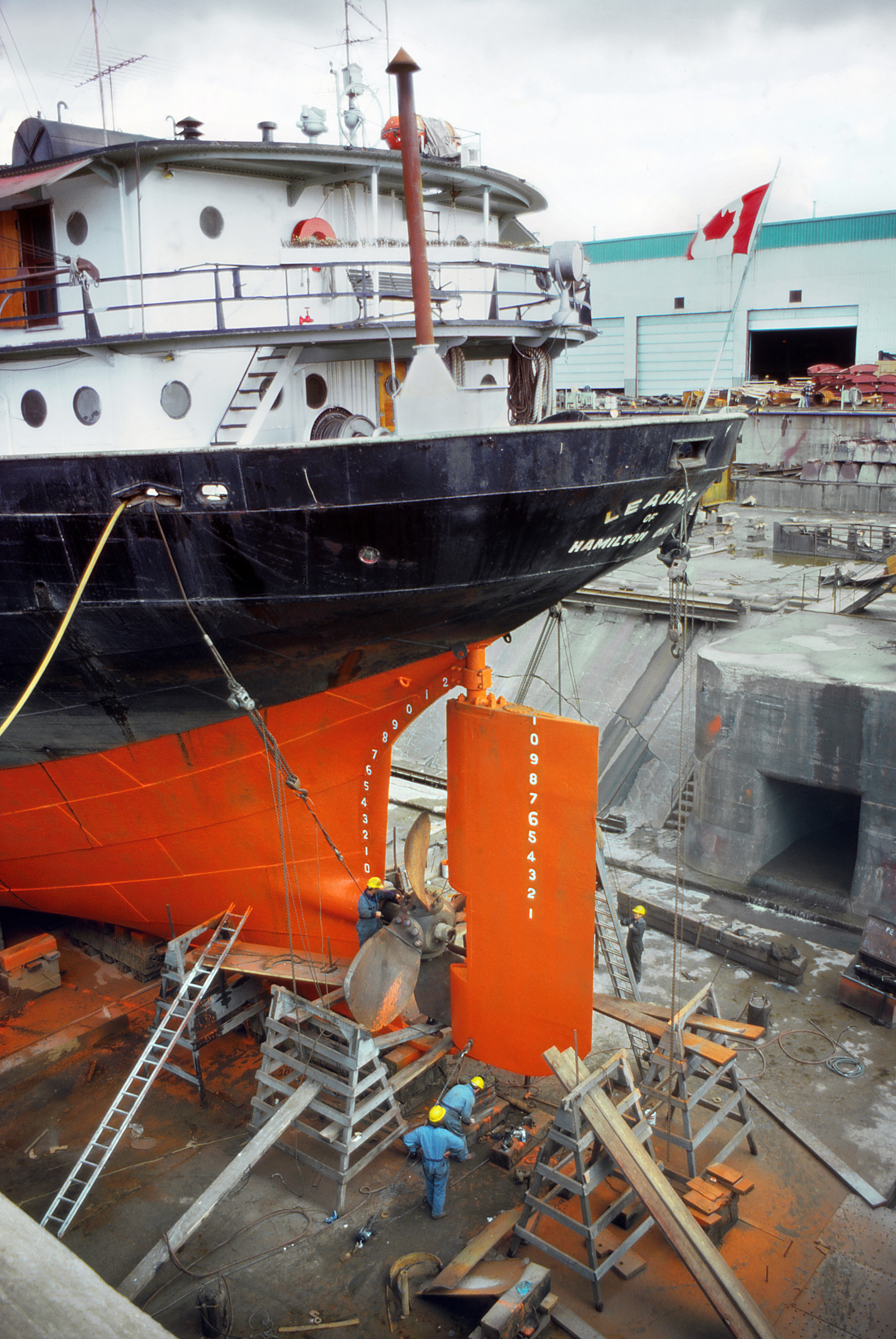
Leadale at Port Weller Dry Docks in 1975

Ships built at this facility include:

1. CCGS Des Groseilliers icebreaker for Canadian Coast Guard
2. Holiday Island for Canadian National Railway (scrapped 2023)
3. Vacationland for Canadian National Railway
4. Windsolite Imperial Oil tanker
5. Canadian Progress - 1968 - largest self-unloading bulk carrier on the Great Lakes at launch (broken up 2014)
6. Dal-housie City a local passenger vessel
7. Saskadoc - large bulk carrier
8. Bruce Hudson - oil tanker
9. Makaweli - tanker
10. Wellandoc (Brampton) - bauxite carrier during World War II
11. Handy Boy - floating steam crane
12. John A. France 1960 - Great Lakes bulk carrier - renamed Algoriver in 1994 by Algoma Central and scrapped in Turkey 2003
13. Coalfax - converted self-loader
14. Soreldoc - laker
15. Bayanna - self-loading steamer
16. C.H. Houson 1929 - canaller
17. Ralph S. Misener 1968 - bulk carrier and named for President of Scott Misner Steamships Limited was built in Montreal and now renamed Gordan C Leitch
18. Norman B. Macpherson - former canal bulk carrier Loadmaster
19. Lt. John Misener - bulk laker built as Scott Misner and renamed 1954
20. Texaco Brave - oil tanker
21. Blue Cross
22. Blue River
23. Transtream - tanker
24. Translate
25. Clevelander
26. Governor - tug
27. Is-obel and Sidney Mac - dredgers
28. The Inland (Transinland) - canallers
29. Milverton (Clary Foran)
30. Imperial Whitby (self-unloader George S. Gleet) - tanker
31. Texaco Warrior - oil tanker
32. Scott Misener 1951 - bulker laker and renamed John E F Misner 1954
33. John O. McKellar 1952 - laker
34. Rocky River - tug
35. Black River and Pic River - diesel driven bulkers
36. Robert Woods
37. Albion - steamer
38. Captain C.D. Secord - steamer
39. Grey Beaver - bulk carrier
40. C.A. Ansell (Fairlake and Ralph S. Misener)
41. Chicago Tribune - newsprinter carrier (came to Port Weller)
42. Jiimaan (1992), ferry servicing Pelee, Ontario

== Refits ==
Port Weller Dry Docks also refitted existing ships. In 1980, the Upper Lakes Group had their bulk carrier St. Lawrence Navigator extensively rebuilt by the shipyard, giving the vessel a new bow section, a new bow thruster and expanding the vessel to seawaymax dimensions. In 2003, the yard refitted the museum ship HMCS Haida. In 2012–2013, the refits of the Canadian Coast Guard ship CCGS Amundsen and the destroyer HMCS Athabaskan were also done by the yard.
