= Upper Lakes Shipping Company =

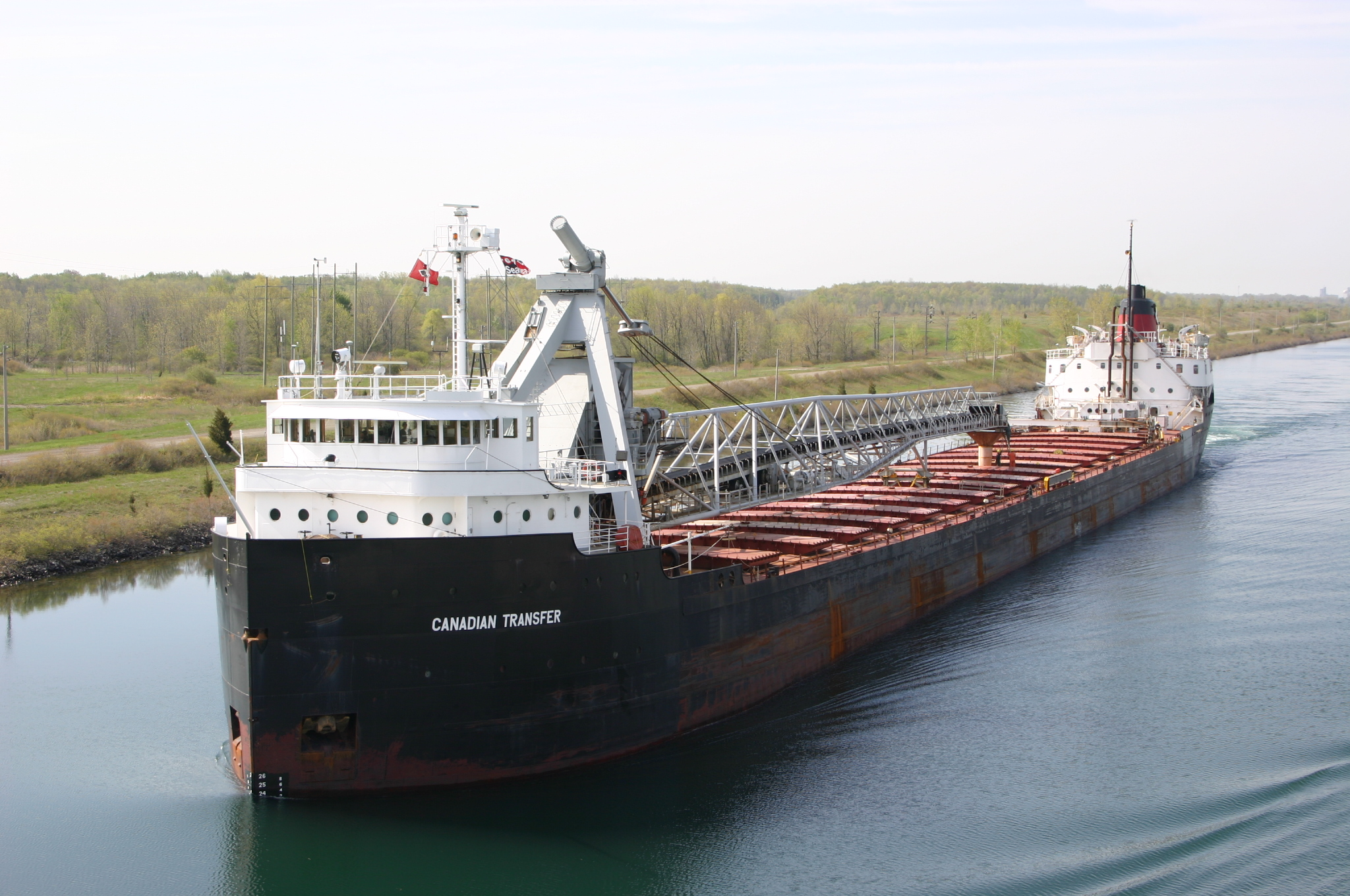
Laker Canadian Transfer on the Saint Lawrence Seaway (2005)

The Upper Lakes Shipping Company was a Canadian shipping company that maintained a fleet of lake freighters on the North American Great Lakes from 1931 to 2011.

House flag used by Upper Lakes

The company was privately owned. In February 2011 the company sold its fleet to Algoma Central.
