= Grand Trunk Corporation =

American transport company

Overview
- Parent company: Canadian National Railway
- Headquarters: Montreal, Quebec, Canada
- Locale: United States; Canada
- Dates of operation: 1971–present

Technical
- Track gauge: 4 ft 8 1/2 in (1,435 mm) standard gauge

Other
- Website: www.cn.ca

The Grand Trunk Corporation is the subsidiary holding company for the Canadian National Railway's properties in the United States, and Canada. It is named for CN subsidiary railroad Grand Trunk Western Railroad. The Association of American Railroads has considered it to be a Class I railroad since fiscal year 2002.

GTC was incorporated under Delaware General Corporation Law on September 21, 1970 as Grand Trunk Industries, Inc., and renamed Grand Trunk Corporation on November 18, 1970. It acquired control of CN's U.S. properties; Grand Trunk Western, Central Vermont Railway and the Duluth, Winnipeg and Pacific Railway in December 1971, and has since acquired other companies, mostly through acquisitions of other holding companies: Illinois Central Railroad (IC) in 1999, Wisconsin Central Transportation Corporation (WC) in 2001, Great Lakes Transportation in 2004, and Elgin, Joliet and Eastern Railway in 2008.

Company	Acquired from	Date	Notes
Algoma Central Railway	WC	2001	
Bessemer and Lake Erie Railroad	GLT	2004	
Cedar River Railroad	IC	1999	
Chicago Central and Pacific Railroad	IC	1999	
Duluth, Missabe and Iron Range Railway	GLT	2004	
Duluth, Winnipeg and Pacific Railway	CN	December 1971	
Grand Trunk Western Railroad	CN	December 1971	
Great Lakes Fleet	GLT	2004	
Illinois Central Railroad	IC	1999	
Pittsburgh and Conneaut Dock Company	GLT	2004	
Sault Ste. Marie Bridge Company	WC	2001	
Waterloo Railway	IC	1999	
Wisconsin Central Ltd.	WC	2001	
Wisconsin Chicago Link Ltd.	WC	2001	

Former subsidiaries
Company	Acquired from	Date	Notes
Central Vermont Railway	CN	December 1971	Sold February 1995 to RailTex
Detroit, Toledo and Ironton Railroad	Pennco (Penn Central Corporation)	June 1980	Merged December 1983 into Grand Trunk Western Railroad
Detroit and Toledo Shore Line Railroad	Acquired Norfolk and Western's 50% share.	April 1981	Merged October 1981 into Grand Trunk Western Railroad
Elgin, Joliet and Eastern Railway	Transtar Inc. (United States Steel Corporation)	2009	Fully merged into GTW on 1 January 2013
Fox Valley and Western Ltd.	WC	2001	Merged December 2002 into Wisconsin Central Ltd.
St. Clair Tunnel Company	CN	December 1971	Merged September 2008 into Grand Trunk Western Railroad
