= E. H. Harriman Award =

The E.H. Harriman Award was an annual award presented to American railroad companies in recognition for outstanding safety achievements.

== History ==
The award was founded in 1913 by Mary Averell Harriman, wife of the late Edward H. Harriman. After her death, the award was presented by her sons E. Roland Harriman and W. Averell Harriman. Today the award is sponsored by the E.H. Harriman Memorial Awards Institute.

On January 5, 2012, UP announced to its employees that for the first time in ninety-eight years the Harriman award would be retired after the 2012 award ceremony. The Association of American Railroads (AAR) made the decision to end the award presentation.

== Criticism ==
While the awards were intended to encourage safe operating practices and safety enhancements, the awards have also occasionally been the source of some labor disputes. Part of the award criteria has been a count of the number of reported workplace injuries as tracked by the Federal Railroad Administration (FRA); this has led to disciplinary action and even dismissal for employees at some railroads. Union Pacific Railroad (UP), in particular, was shown to have suppressed reporting of some accidents in the early 1970s, leading to their disqualification and withdrawal from consideration for the award over several years. UP launched an intensive safety program and again earned a Harriman gold medal in 1984.

Several rail labor unions objected to the criteria, going so far as to picket the award ceremonies. Brotherhood of Maintenance of Way Employes (BMWE) General Chairman Paul Beard created the "Harassment Award" as a satire of the Harriman Awards to raise awareness of management practices that bred intimidation and disciplinary actions against reporting accidents. In 1999 the FRA invited discussions with representatives of rail labor unions to discuss the problem.

== Recipients ==
The selection process included a rule that the same railroad company could not be selected for a gold medal in two consecutive years. This practice ended in the 1970s when Santa Fe Railroad was selected as the gold medal recipient for several consecutive years.

Railroad companies are grouped into one of four categories:

- Group A railroads are line-haul railroads with greater than 15 million employee hours per year.
- Group B railroads are line-haul railroads with between 4 and 15 million employee hours per year.
- Group C railroads are line-haul railroads with less than 4 million employee hours per year.
- Group S&T railroads are switching and terminal railroads

Historically, the award recipients were notified in May of the year following the statistics calculation with the presentation ceremony in September or October. Later the award announcements and presentations were made in May of the year after the award designation; for example, the 2004 awards were presented in May 2005. Past recipients of the E.H. Harriman Award were:

Year	Group	Gold medal	Silver medal	Bronze medal
1913	A	Southern Pacific		
1914	A	New York Central		
1914	B	Atlantic Coast Line		
1915	A	Norfolk and Western		
1916	A	Alabama Great Southern Railway	Illinois Central (Illinois Division)	Long Island Railroad
1917				
1918				
1919				
1920				
1921				
1922				
1923				
1924	A	Union Pacific	Chicago Great Western (Western Division)	Joseph Kragskow, UP Omaha shops (individual award)
1925	A	Union Pacific		
1926	A	Norfolk and Western		
1926	B	Duluth, Missabe and Northern		
1926	C	Quincy, Omaha and Kansas City		
1927	A	Union Pacific		
1927	B	Ann Arbor Railway		
1928	A	Southern Pacific		
1929	A	Union Pacific (OSL)		
1930	A	Pennsylvania Railroad	Union Pacific	
1930	B		Gulf, Mobile and Northern Railroad	
1930	C		New Orleans Great Northern Railroad	
1934	A	Chicago, Burlington and Quincy Railroad		
1935	A		New York Central	
1937	A	New York Central		
1938	A	Norfolk and Western		
1939	A	Union Pacific Railroad (south central district)		
1939	B	Chicago, St. Paul, Minneapolis and Omaha Railway		
1939	C	Charleston and Western Carolina Railway		
1939	A special award was presented to New York Central Railroad to commemorate more than 16 years without any passenger fatalities as of 1939.			
1940	A	Union Pacific (South Central)		
1941	A	Union Pacific Railroad (Eastern district)		
1942		New York Central System	Bessemer and Lake Erie Railroad	
1943	A	Union Pacific (Eastern district)		
1943	B	Duluth, Missabe and Iron Range Railway		
1943	C	Charleston and Western Carolina Railway		
1944	A	Michigan Central Railroad		
1944	B	Ann Arbor Railroad		
1944	C	Lake Superior and Ishpeming Railroad		
1945	A			
1949	A	Louisville and Nashville	Erie Railroad	
1949	B			
1949	C	Tennessee Central		
1950	A	Union Pacific (Western District)	Eastern district: Reading Railroad; Western district: Missouri-Kansas-Texas Railroad	
1950	B	Pennsylvania-Reading Seashore Lines	Western district: Duluth, Missabe and Iron Range Railway	
1950	C	Cambria and Indiana Railroad	Western district: Colorado and Wyoming Railway	
1951	A	Norfolk and Western	Eastern district: Reading Railroad	
1952	A	Missouri-Kansas-Texas	Eastern district: Baltimore and Ohio; Western district: Union Pacific; Southern district: Norfolk and Western	
1952	B	St. Louis Southwestern	Eastern district: Lehigh Valley; Western district: Duluth, Missabe and Iron Range; Southern district: Central of Georgia	
1952	C	Texas Mexican Railway	Eastern district: Lehigh and Hudson River; Western district: Lake Superior and Ishpeming; Southern district: Atlantic and Danville	
1952	S&T	Chicago Union Station Company	Portland, Maine, Terminal Company	
1953	A		Eastern district: Reading Railroad; Southern district: Nashville, Chattanooga and Saint Louis Railway	
1954	A	Norfolk and Western Railway	Eastern district: Reading Railroad; Western district: Great Northern Railway	
1954	B	Chicago, Indianapolis and Louisville Railroad	Western district: St. Louis Southwestern Railway	
1954	C	Texas Mexican Railroad	Western district: Texas Northern Railway	
1955	A	Atlantic Coast Line Railroad	Eastern district: Pennsylvania Railroad; Western district: Union Pacific Railroad; Southern district: Illinois Central	
1955	B	Duluth, Missabe and Iron Range Railway	Eastern district: Western Maryland Railway; Western district: Minneapolis, St. Paul and Sault Ste Marie Railroad; Southern district: Nashville, Chattanooga and St. Louis Railway	
1955	C	Bessemer and Lake Erie Railroad	Eastern district: Lehigh and Hudson River Railway; Western district: Texas Mexican Railway; Southern district: Richmond, Fredericksburg and Potomac Railroad	
1955	S&T	Portland (Maine) Terminal Railroad	New Orleans Terminal Railroad	
1956	A	Union Pacific	Eastern district: Erie Railroad	
1956	B	Chicago and Eastern Illinois Railroad		
1956	C	Bangor and Aroostook Railroad		
1956	S&T	Baltimore and Ohio Chicago Terminal Railroad		
1957	A	Nickel Plate Road	Eastern district: Pittsburgh and Lake Erie Railroad; Western district: Northern Pacific Railroad; Southern district: Illinois Central	
1957	B	Duluth, Missabe and Iron Range Railroad	Eastern district: Wabash Railroad; Western district: St. Louis Southwestern; Southern district: Central of Georgia Railway	
1957	C	Bessemer and Lake Erie Railroad	Eastern district: New York, Susquehanna and Western; Western district: Texas Mexican Railway; Southern district: Clinchfield Railroad	
1957	S&T	Kentucky and Indiana Terminal	New Orleans Terminal	
1957	The Pullman Company was awarded a special certificate of commendation for working with the railroad companies to transport about 45 billion passengers with no fatalities from 1952 to 1957.			
1958	A		Eastern district: Nickel Plate Road	
1958	C	New York, Susquehanna & Western		
1959	A	Atlantic Coast Line Railroad	Southern district: Illinois Central	
1959	B	Chicago and Eastern Illinois Railroad		
1959	C	Canadian Pacific lines in Maine and Montreal	Western district: Texas Mexican Railway	
1960	A	Nickel Plate Road		
1961	A	Nickel Plate Road		
1961	B	Gulf, Mobile and Ohio Railroad		
1961	C	Bangor and Aroostook Railroad		
1962	A	Union Pacific Railroad		
1963	A	Nickel Plate Road		
1964	A	Illinois Central		
1964	B	Monon Railroad		
1965	A	Chicago and North Western		
1966	A	Union Pacific		
1966	B			
1966	C			
1967	A	Union Pacific	Southern Pacific Railroad	
1967	B	St. Louis Southwestern		
1967	C			
1968	A		Southern Pacific Railroad	
1968	B		St. Louis Southwestern	
1968	C			
1969	A			
1969	B		Western Maryland Railway	
1970	A	Atchison, Topeka and Santa Fe Railway		
1970	B			
1970	C			
1970	S&T			
1971	A	Santa Fe		
1971	B			
1971	C			
1971	S&T		Union Railroad of Pittsburgh	
1972	A	Santa Fe		Union Pacific
1972	B			
1972	C	Delaware and Hudson		
1973	A	Santa Fe		
1973	B			
1973	C		Akron, Canton and Youngstown Railroad	
1973	S&T		Philadelphia, Bethlehem and New England Railroad	
1975	A	Santa Fe	Seaboard Coast Line	Chessie System
1975	B	Erie-Lackawanna	Denver and Rio Grande Western	Reading Railroad
1975	C	Delaware and Hudson	Monongahela Railway	Florida East Coast Railroad
1975	S&T	River Terminal Railway, Cleveland	Union Railroad, Pittsburgh	Guyanoga Valley Railroad, Clevaland
1976	A	Southern Railway	Seaboard Coast Line	
1976	B	Denver and Rio Grande Western Railroad		
1976	C	Florida East Coast Railway		
1976	S&T	Philadelphia, Bethlehem and New England Railroad		
1977	A			Missouri Pacific
1977	B			
1977	C	Florida East Coast Railway	Central Vermont Railway	
1978	A	Southern Railway		Missouri Pacific
1978	B			St. Louis-San Francisco Railway
1978	C	Florida East Coast Railway	Central Vermont Railway	Alton and Southern Railway
1979	A	Santa Fe	Southern Railway	Missouri Pacific
1979	B	Denver and Rio Grande Western Railroad	Boston and Maine	St Louis-San Francisco Railway
1979	C	Florida East Coast Railway	Central Vermont Railway	Ann Arbor Railroad
1979	S&T	Houston Belt and Terminal Railway	Philadelphia, Bethlehem and New England Railroad	Alton and Southern Railway
1979	The Bangor and Aroostook Railroad, Peoria and Pekin Union Railroad and the Lake Terminal Railroad were awarded special certificates for improvements in their safety records.			
1980	A	Santa Fe	Missouri Pacific	Southern Railway
1980	B	Denver and Rio Grande Western		
1980	C			
1980	S&T	Houston Belt and Terminal Railway	Kansas City Terminal Railway	Alton and Southern Railway
1981	A		Missouri Pacific	
1981	B	Denver and Rio Grande Western		
1981	C			
1981	S&T		Philadelphia, Bethlehem and New England Railroad	South Buffalo Railway
1982	A	Southern Railway	Family Lines System (L&N)	
1982	B	Denver and Rio Grande Western		
1983	A			Union Pacific
1983	B	Denver and Rio Grande Western		
1984	A	Union Pacific Railroad		
1984	B	Denver and Rio Grande Western		
1984	C			
1984	S&T	Houston Belt and Terminal Railway	Port Terminal Railroad Association, Houston	
1985	B	Denver and Rio Grande Western		
1986	A	Southern Pacific Railroad		
1986	B		Denver and Rio Grande Western	
1986	C			
1986	S&T			
1987	A	Southern Pacific Railroad		
1987	B		Chicago and North Western	
1988	A	Southern Pacific		
1988	B		Missouri-Kansas-Texas	
1989	A	Norfolk Southern Railway		Southern Pacific
1989	B	Denver and Rio Grande Western		
1989	C			
1989	S&T			
1990	A	Norfolk Southern Railway		
1990	B		Chicago and North Western	
1990	C			
1990	S&T			
1991	A	Norfolk Southern Railway		
1991	B	Chicago and North Western	Denver and Rio Grande Western	
1991	C			
1991	S&T		Belt Railway of Chicago	
1992	A	Norfolk Southern Railway		
1992	B			Chicago and North Western
1992	C			
1992	S&T			
1993	A	Norfolk Southern Railway	CSX Transportation	Amtrak
1993	B	Illinois Central	Chicago and North Western	Northeast Illinois Railroad Corp.
1993	C	Bessemer and Lake Erie Railroad	Kansas City Southern Railway	Wheeling and Lake Erie Railway
1993	S&T			
1994	A	Norfolk Southern Railway		Santa Fe
1994	B		Chicago and North Western	
1994	C			
1994	S&T			
1995	A	Norfolk Southern Railway		
1995	B			
1995	C			
1995	S&T	Belt Railway of Chicago		
1996	A	Norfolk Southern Railway	Burlington Northern and Santa Fe	CSX Transportation
1996	B	New Jersey Transit Rail Operations	Illinois Central	Kansas City Southern
1996	C	Texas Mexican	Providence & Worcester	New York, Susquehanna & Western
1996	S&T	Port Terminal Railroad Association	Belt Railway of Chicago	Houston Belt & Terminal Railway
1997	A	Norfolk Southern Railway	Burlington Northern Santa Fe	CSX Transportation
1997	B	Illinois Central Railroad	New Jersey Transit Rail Operations	Kansas City Southern
1997	C	Guilford Rail System	Gateway Western Railway	Texas Mexican Railway
1997	S&T	Port Terminal Railroad Association of Houston	Terminal Railroad Association of St. Louis	Patapsco & Black Rivers Railroad
1997	Paducah and Louisville Railroad was awarded a certificate recognizing continuing safety improvements for at least two consecutive years as of 1997.			
1998	A	Norfolk Southern Railway		
1998	B			
1998	C	Montana Rail Link		
1998	S&T			
1999	A	Norfolk Southern Railway	Burlington Northern and Santa Fe Railway	CSX Transportation
1999	B	Illinois Central Railroad	Kansas City Southern Railway	NJ Transit
1999	C	Bessemer and Lake Erie Railroad	Duluth, Winnipeg and Pacific Railroad	Guilford Rail System
1999	S&T	Belt Railway of Chicago	Port Terminal Railroad Association	Patapsco and Back Rivers Railroad
2000	A	Norfolk Southern Railway		
2000	B	Kansas City Southern Railway		
2000	C	Gateway Western Railway		
2000	S&T		Belt Railway of Chicago	
2001	A	Norfolk Southern Railway		
2001	B	Kansas City Southern Railway		
2001	C			
2001	S&T		Belt Railway of Chicago	Alton and Southern Railway
2002	A	Norfolk Southern Railway		
2002	B		Metra	
2002	C			
2002	S&T	Terminal Railroad Association of St. Louis	Conrail	
2003	A	Norfolk Southern Railway		Union Pacific Railroad
2003	B	Metra	Soo Line Railroad	
2003	C	Iowa Interstate Railroad		
2003	S&T	Terminal Railroad Association of St. Louis	Conrail	
2004	A	Norfolk Southern Railway	BNSF Railway	Union Pacific Railroad
2004	B	Metra	Soo Line Railroad	Illinois Central Railroad
2004	C	Guilford Rail System	Wheeling and Lake Erie Railway	Providence and Worcester Railroad
2004	S&T	Terminal Railroad Association of St. Louis	Conrail	Alton and Southern Railway
2005	A	Norfolk Southern Railway	BNSF Railway	CSX
2005	B	Canadian Pacific's U.S. subsidiary (formerly Soo Line Railroad)	Kansas City Southern	Metra
2005	C	Florida East Coast Railway	Pan Am Railways	Elgin, Joliet and Eastern Railroad
2005	S&T	Terminal Railroad Association of St. Louis	Conrail	Belt Railway of Chicago
2006	A	Norfolk Southern Railway	CSX Transportation	BNSF Railway
2006	B	Kansas City Southern Railway	Canadian Pacific Railway's United States subsidiary	Long Island Rail Road
2006	C	Florida East Coast Railway	Central Oregon and Pacific Railroad	BNSF Suburban Operations in Chicago
2006	S&T	Birmingham Southern Railroad	Conrail	Terminal Railroad Association of St. Louis
2007	A	Norfolk Southern Railway	CSX Transportation	Union Pacific Railroad
2007	B	Kansas City Southern Railway	Metra	Canadian Pacific Railway U.S. operations
2007	C	Iowa Interstate Railroad	Elgin, Joliet and Eastern Railway	Florida East Coast Railway
2007	S&T	Terminal Railroad Association of St. Louis	Union Railroad	Birmingham Southern Railroad
2008	A	Norfolk Southern Railway	CSX Transportation	Union Pacific Railroad
2008	B	Kansas City Southern Railway	Canadian Pacific Railway's United States subsidiary	Metra
2008	C	Willamette and Pacific Railroad	Florida East Coast Railway	Wheeling and Lake Erie Railway
2008	S&T	Terminal Railroad Association of St. Louis	Birmingham Southern Railroad	Conrail
2009	A	Norfolk Southern Railway	CSX Transportation	Union Pacific Railroad
2009	B	Kansas City Southern Railway	Metra	Canadian National Railway U.S. operations
2009	C	Buffalo and Pittsburgh Railroad	BNSF Railway suburban operations	Paducah and Louisville Railway
2009	S&T	Indiana Harbor Belt Railroad	Gary Railway	Birmingham Southern Railroad
2010	A	Norfolk Southern Railway	CSX Transportation	Union Pacific Railroad
2010	B	Kansas City Southern Railway	Canadian Pacific Railway U.S. operations	Canadian National Railway U.S. operations
2010	C	Buffalo and Pittsburgh Railroad	Missouri and Northern Arkansas Railroad	Paducah and Louisville Railway
2010	S&T	Gary Railway	Port Terminal Railroad Association	Union Railroad
2011	A	Norfolk Southern Railway	CSX Transportation	Union Pacific Railroad
2011	B	Kansas City Southern Railway	Canadian Pacific Railway U.S. operations	Metra
2011	C	Buffalo and Pittsburgh Railroad	Portland and Western	Florida East Coast Railway
2011	S&T	Union Railway	Belt Railway of Chicago	Birmingham Southern Railroad
