= Duluth, Winnipeg and Pacific Railway =

Subsidiary railroad of Canadian National Railway

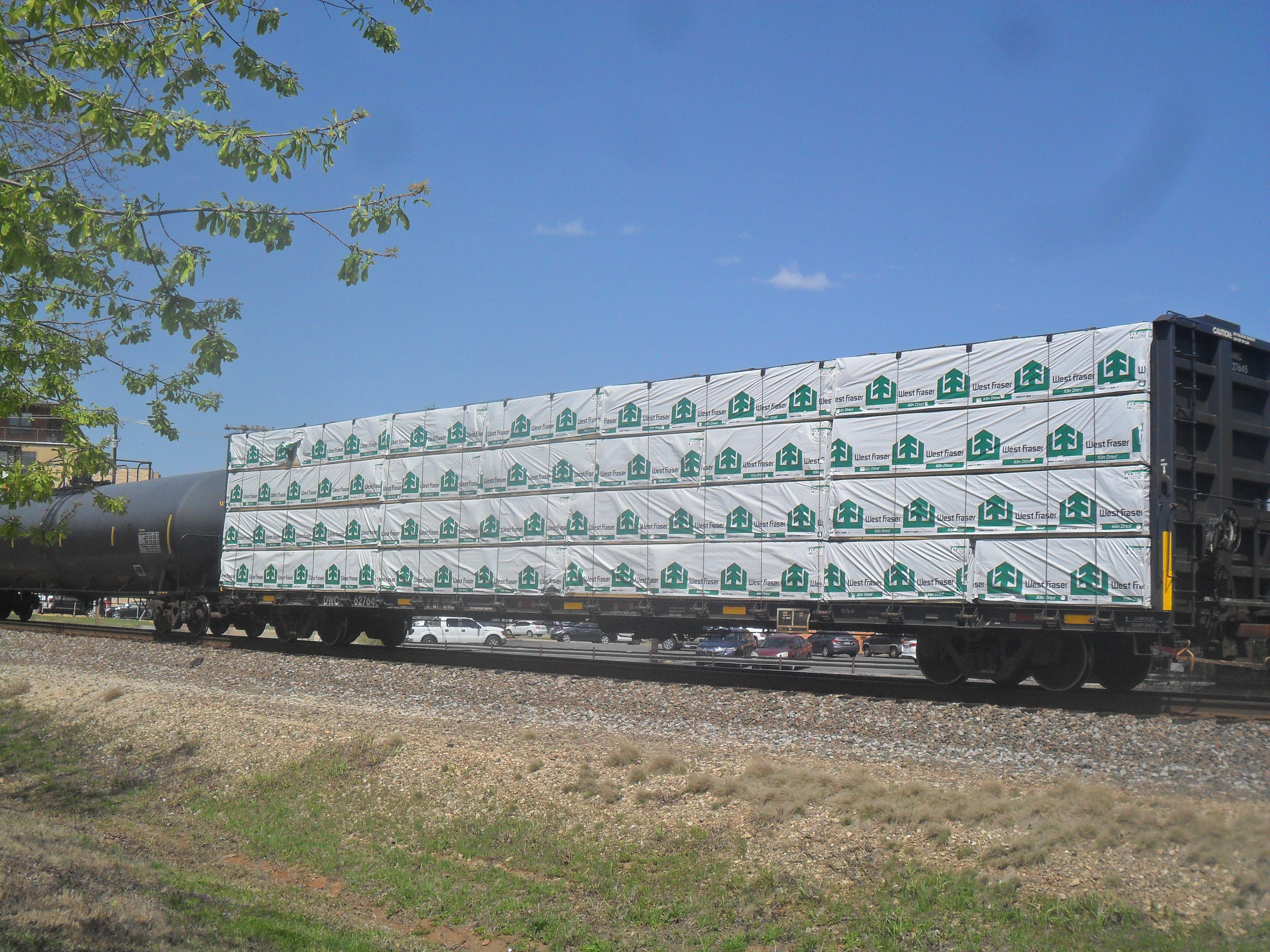
- A Duluth, Winnipeg, and Pacific Railway centerbeam flat car in Norman, Oklahoma.

Overview
- Parent company: Canadian National Railway (1919-present): Wisconsin Central Ltd. (2012-present); Canadian Northern Railway (until 1919)
- Headquarters: Duluth, Minnesota, United States, 1984-2012 Superior WI
- Reporting mark: DWP, DWC
- Locale: northern Minnesota
- Dates of operation: 1901–
- Successor: Canadian National Railway, Wisconsin Central Ltd. (2012-present)

Technical
- Track gauge: 4 ft 8 1/2 in (1,435 mm) standard gauge

The Duluth, Winnipeg and Pacific Railway (reporting mark DWP) is a subsidiary railroad of Canadian National Railway (CN) operating in northern Minnesota, United States. A CN system-wide rebranding beginning in 1995 has seen the DWP logo and name largely replaced by its parent company. The DWP line is CN's connection between International Falls and Duluth, Minnesota, where the railroad connects to a short stretch of the former Duluth, Missabe and Iron Range Railway before following the former Wisconsin Central (both now wholly owned by CN) to Chicago, Illinois.

In 1970 DW&P reported 792 million ton-miles of revenue freight and no passenger miles; at the end of that year it operated 170 miles (274 km) of road and 232 miles (373 km) of track.

== History ==
Lines constructed by the DW&P and its subsidiaries

The Duluth, Virginia and Rainy Lake Railway (DV&RL) started construction at Virginia, Minnesota, in 1901, with the line extending north to Sand Lake, Minnesota, when the company was purchased by the Canadian Northern Railway (CNoR) who renamed it the Duluth, Rainy Lake and Winnipeg Railway (DRL&W).

Construction continued through 1908 to extend the line north to Ranier, Minnesota, where it bridged the Rainy River on the Canada–United States border to cross into Fort Frances, Ontario, and an interchange with the CNoR mainline between Winnipeg, Manitoba, and Port Arthur, Ontario.

In 1909, CNoR incorporated the Duluth, Winnipeg and Pacific Railway, and construction started to achieve access south from Virginia, Minnesota, to Duluth, Minnesota. Duluth was reached in 1912, providing interchange with several US railways.

The DW&P mainline ran for 167 mi (269 km) from Duluth Junction at Fort Frances (CNoR interchange) to DW&P Junction (Northern Pacific Railway (U.S.)).

Following the bankruptcy of the CNoR system and its subsequent nationalization by Canada's federal government under the Canadian National Railways (CNR), the DW&P was maintained as an important connection for CNR to the upper mid-western states.

During the post-war era, the DW&P line was upgraded to handle an increase in freight and unit train traffic, such as potash, lumber and paper. In 1960 CNR changed its name to "Canadian National/Canadien National" (CN) and introduced a radical new paint scheme and logo. At the same time, DW&P was changed to just DWP and given a logo of similar flowing design to the CN "noodle". CN's other US subsidiary, and Grand Trunk Western Railroad also underwent a similar name/acronym change to Grand Trunk Western (GT), as did the Central Vermont Railway.

The DW&P's primary passenger terminal in Duluth was via the Chicago, St. Paul, Minneapolis & Omaha's (Chicago & North Western) brick/stone structure at 5th Avenue West in the city's downtown area, not far from Duluth Union Depot (served by St. Paul & Duluth [Northern Pacific], Duluth & Iron Range, and Duluth, Missabe & Northern). The company eventually opened its own three-story facility in West Duluth during spring 1913 although it was only used as a secondary terminal, primarily housing offices while also maintaining mail/express business. Finally, trackage rights were secured over Northern Pacific for 2.6 miles (4.2 km) to Rices Point Yard where it gained direct freight interchange points with NP and Milwaukee Road. Within just a few years of the "Peg's" opening, parent Canadian Northern found itself in dire financial straits. It was turned over to the government on September 6, 1918, and later nationalized as part of the Canadian National Railways, incorporated on June 6, 1919. The DW&P maintained a separate identity during this corporate reshuffling and later became part of CN's Grand Trunk Corporation formed on July 31, 1971, which maintained CN's American holdings.

DWP began to play an increasingly important role for CN in the 1990s, following the implementation of the Canada-US Free Trade Agreement (FTA), and later the North American Free Trade Agreement (NAFTA), which contributed to increases in Canadian exports south and US imports north. The DWP provided the most direct connection from CN's western Canadian trackage to the major US interchanges at Chicago, Illinois, however unlike rival Canadian Pacific Railway which had its own Soo Line Railroad subsidiary trackage to use, CN was forced to interchange with US railroads at Duluth, such as Great Northern (later Burlington Northern Railroad, later Burlington Northern and Santa Fe Railway) or Wisconsin Central Ltd. In the mid-1990s, CN and WC entered into a formal agreement whereby WC agreed to haul CN trains to Chicago.

The mid-1990s also saw a major change in how US subsidiaries like DWP and GT fit into CN's corporate structure whereby in 1993–1994, CN changed the name of its entire system to "CN North America" (CNNA) and began a major locomotive and freight car repainting program which saw the GT and DWP logos and names disappear, with only the holding company "Grand Trunk Corporation" remaining on paper and legal documents. In 1995, the CNNA experiment ended and the name "Canadian National/Canadien National" with the CN acronym returned, only system-wide in both countries. On November 28, 1995, Canada's federal government privatized CN and its US subsidiaries.

In 2001, CN entered into an agreement to purchase WC entirely on October 21 of that year, providing CN with an "iron lariat" encircling the industrially-important Great Lakes Basin. The only gap in CN's Winnipeg–Fort Frances/International Falls–Chicago mainline route was a short 17-kilometre (11 mi) section in Duluth where CN had to operate on the Duluth, Missabe and Iron Range Railway to reach WC trackage from the end of DWP trackage. On May 10, 2004, CN purchased DMIR's parent company Great Lakes Transportation to give total control of the Winnipeg–Chicago corridor and remove the gap at Duluth between DWP and WC trackage.

== Merger with Wisconsin Central ==
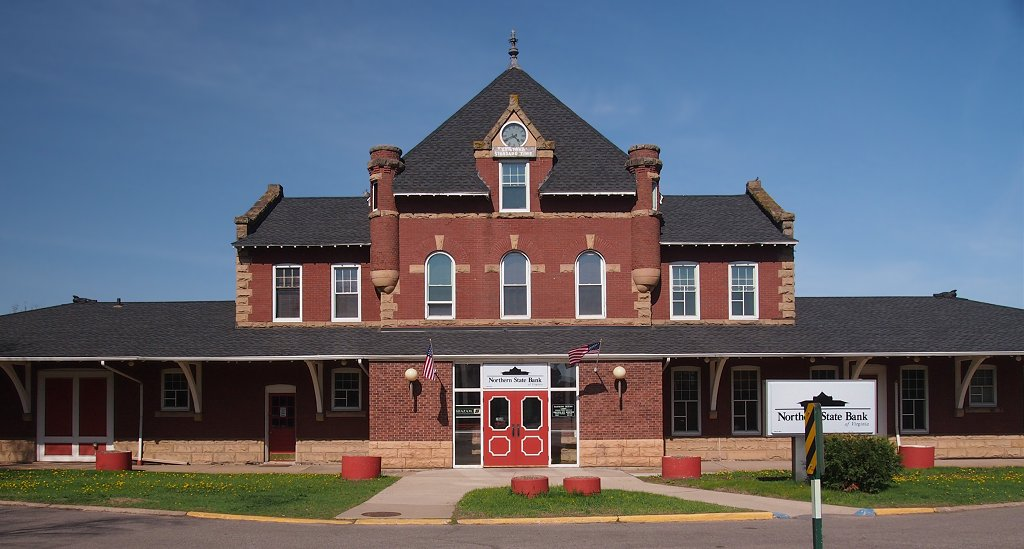

In December 2011, the Duluth, Winnipeg and Pacific Railway was merged into Wisconsin Central Ltd., which is also controlled by Canadian National Railway. This merger was intended to increase efficiency.
