= Transtar (US Company) =

Transtar was a railroad holding company

Transtar, Inc. is a subsidiary of Fortress Transportation and Infrastructure Investors. It was organized in 1988 to own US Steel's railroad and other transportation subsidiaries. During the third quarter of 2021, it was acquired by Fortress Transportation and Infrastructure Investors. In 2025, Fortress Transportation acquired the Wheeling & Lake Erie Railroad and merged it and Transtar under one collective brand known as "The Wheeling".

Transtar owns or has owned the following companies:

Company	Acquired from	Date	Notes
Bessemer & Lake Erie Railroad	US Steel	1988	Sold 2001 to Great Lakes Transportation
Birmingham Terminal Railway	US Steel	1988	Sent to Watco in 2012, name changed from Birmingham Southern Railroad to Birmingham Terminal Railway.
Delray Connecting Railroad	National Steel Corporation	2003	Owned directly by US Steel until 2005
Duluth, Missabe & Iron Range Railway	US Steel	1988	Sold 2001 to Great Lakes Transportation
East Ohio Valley Railroad	Independent	2023	Expanded significantly in 2024
Elgin, Joliet & Eastern Railway	US Steel	1988	Sold 2009 to Canadian National
Fairfield Southern Company	US Steel	1988	In-plant operation; subsidiary of Birmingham Southern Railroad
Gary Railway	US Steel	2009	Created from unsold part of Elgin, Joliet & Eastern Railway
Lake Terminal Railroad	US Steel	1988	Merged with the Lorain Terminal Railroad
McKeesport Connecting Railroad	US Steel	1988	Ceased operations
Mobile River Terminal Company	US Steel	1988	Subsidiary of Warrior and Gulf Navigation Company
Pittsburgh and Conneaut Dock Company	US Steel	1988	Sold 2001 to Great Lakes Transportation
Texas and Northern Railway	Lone Star Steel Company	2007	
USS Great Lakes Fleet	US Steel	1988	Sold 2001 to Great Lakes Transportation
Union Railroad	US Steel	1988	
Warrior and Gulf Navigation Company	US Steel	1988	
