= Grand Trunk =

Grand Trunk may refer to:

- Grand Trunk Corporation, the subsidiary holding company for the Canadian National Railway's properties in the United States
- Grand Trunk Railway, a railway system that operated in the Canadian provinces of Quebec and Ontario, and in the American states of Connecticut, Maine, Michigan, Massachusetts, New Hampshire, and Vermont, a precursor of today's Canadian National Railways
- Grand Trunk Pacific Railway, a historical Canadian transcontinental railway running from Winnipeg to the Pacific coast
- Grand Trunk Western Railroad, an American subsidiary of the Canadian National Railway
- Grand Trunk Road, one of Asia's oldest and longest major roads in the Indian sub-continent
