= Mountain Iron Mine =

- U.S. National Register of Historic Places
- U.S. National Historic Landmark
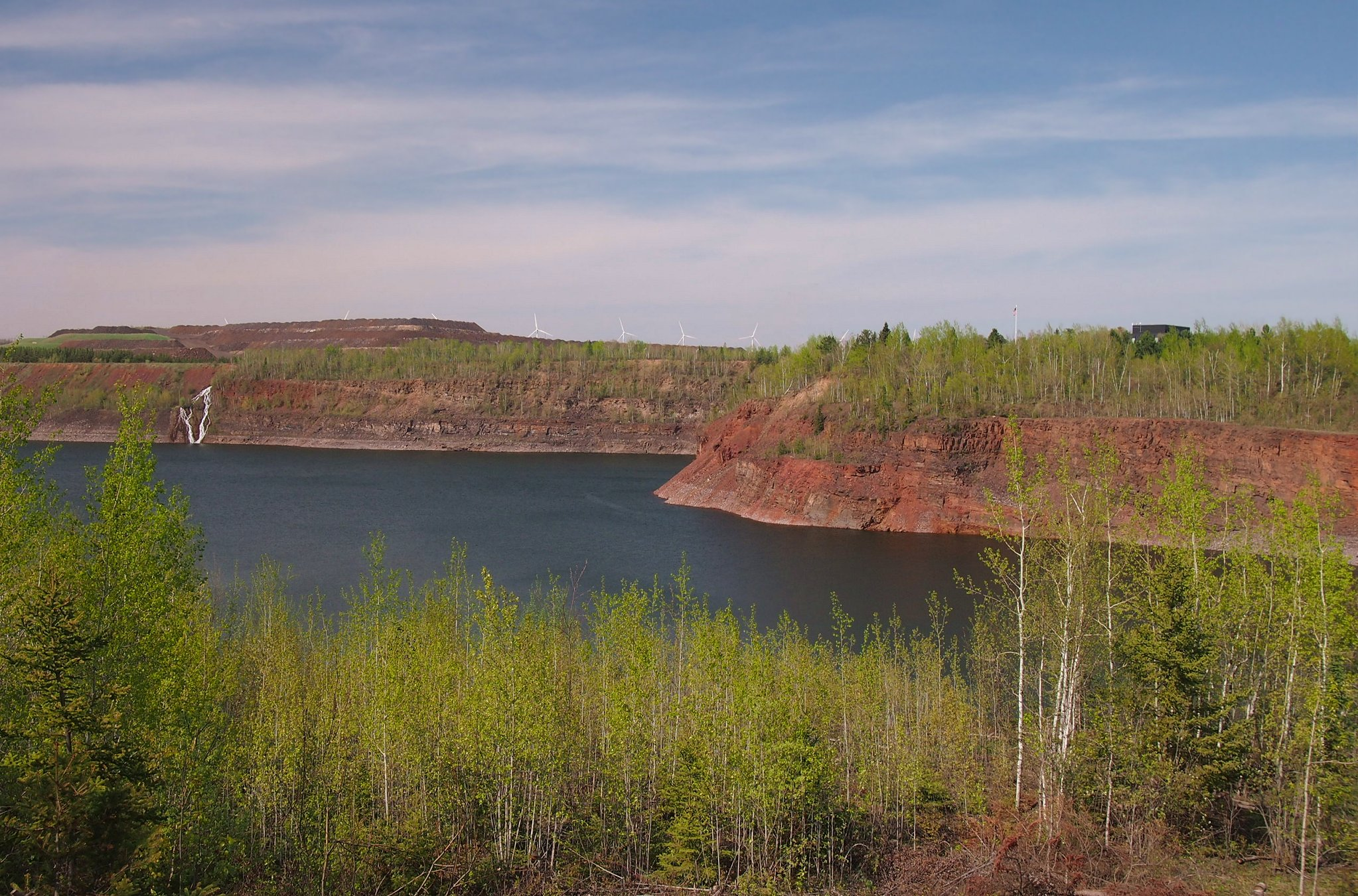
- Mountain Iron Mine from a city overlook

- Location within Minnesota Location within the United States
- Location: North of Mountain Iron, Minnesota
- Coordinates: 47°32′20″N 92°37′20″W
- Area: 240 acres (97 ha)
- Built: 1892
- NRHP reference No.: 68000052

Significant dates
- Added to NRHP: November 24, 1968
- Designated NHL: October 10, 1968

Mountain Iron Mine is a former mine in Mountain Iron, Minnesota, United States. Opened in 1892, it was the first mine on the Mesabi Range, which has proved to be the largest iron ore deposit ever discovered in the United States. Mining operations at the site ceased in 1956. The bottom of the open-pit mine has filled with water but its dimensions are readily visible. The city maintains an overlook in Mountain Iron Locomotive Park.

Mountain Iron Mine was proclaimed a National Historic Landmark in 1968 and subsequently listed on the National Register of Historic Places for its national significance in the theme of industry. The property was nominated for setting in motion the extraction of iron ore on the Mesabi Range, which helped make Minnesota the nation's largest iron producer and the United States the world's largest steel manufacturer.

== History ==
The discovery of a boulder of high-grade iron ore by Leonidas Merritt in 1887 during a railroad survey prompted he and his brothers to establish the Mountain Iron Mine in 1892. By 1893 the "Seven Iron Brothers" had claims on a significant portion of the Mesabi Range and had built the Duluth, Missabe and Northern Railway (DM&IR). Financial conditions forced them to sell their shares to John D. Rockefeller. Rockefeller later sold his interests to Andrew Carnegie.

The early development was as an underground mine, but open-pit mining soon proved to be a better choice because of the soft, shallow ore deposits. The Mesabi Range and nearby Vermilion Range led Minnesota to become the nation's largest producer of iron ore and the United States to lead the world in steel production. This capacity is considered to have been a major factor in America's ability to contribute to World War II. It also played a major role in the financial success of Andrew Carnegie and U.S. Steel. Carnegie returned some of his fortune to the communities by funding 2,500 public Carnegie libraries across the world, including 64 in Minnesota. The extraction of ore in the region also contributed to the city of Duluth thriving and becoming the leading port in the United States (by tonnage) in the early 20th century.

== See also ==
- List of National Historic Landmarks in Minnesota
- National Register of Historic Places listings in St. Louis County, Minnesota
