= Duluth, Missabe and Northern Railway =

Former US railroad company

Overview
- Locale: Minnesota, United States
- Dates of operation: 1891–1937
- Successor: Duluth, Missabe and Iron Range Railway

Technical
- Track gauge: 4 ft 8 1/2 in (1,435 mm)

The Duluth, Missabe and Northern Railway (DM&N, DMN) was a railroad company in the U.S. state of Minnesota. It was one of the earliest iron ore hauling railroads of the area, said to have built the largest iron ore docks in the world, and later was one of the constituent railroads in the merger that formed the Duluth, Missabe and Iron Range Railway.

== History ==
Iron ore had been a particularly plentiful commodity to ship from the Iron Range region, with the seven railroads serving Duluth in the 1891 hauling more than 7 billion pounds of freight.

The Duluth, Missabe and Northern Railway was chartered on February 11, 1891, then incorporated in May 1891 by the Merritt brothers of Duluth. The company's first president was K. D. Chase of Faribault. Its line was opened in 1892 with the first load of iron delivered via trackage rights on the Duluth and Winnipeg Railroad (D&W) and its ore dock in Superior, Wisconsin. In 1893, due in part to the D&W's shortage of freight cars, the DM&N extended its line into Duluth, and built what were then the largest iron ore docks in the world. Also in 1893, the DM&N built a branch from Wolf Junction (near Virginia, Minnesota) to carry heavy mining equipment. The city of Duluth proposed a celebration on Labor Day in 1893 for the completion of the line into Duluth, but the DM&N declined to participate saying that its line was not yet complete.

The company, along with other Merritt iron ore interests in the region, was acquired by John D. Rockefeller during the panic of 1893 as part of a deal that was valued near $30,000,000. The sale was contested in an injunction filed by William L. Brown of Chicago, but the injunction was denied in February 1893. Shortly after, in June 1893, a massive fire blazed through several towns and industries along the DM&N line including Virginia City and Mountain Iron as well as the Minnewas, Messaba Mountain, Lone Jack and Ohio mines. Several fines were soon filed against the railroad amid allegations of improperly favoring certain creditors, but the railroad continued to expand, with the last rail on the Hibbing line laid on October 24, 1893. Although overall ownership had passed to the Rockefeller interests, the Merritts still retained control, as Leonidas Merritt was named president of the Lake Superior Consolidated Iron Mines company, which was then the parent company of the DM&N. Rockefeller had required that the DM&N not work on Sundays, but with the assignment of F.T. Gates as president of DM&N in late October 1894, the railroad resumed working on Sundays.

Plans were made in 1894 to extend the DM&N from Mountain Iron to the new town of Rainy Lake City. Later, wildfires again threatened the railroad and the communities it served when parts of Virginia City and Mountain Iron were burned on June 5, 1894, and fire also destroyed the roundhouse at Hibbing. By June 30, 1894, the DM&N had added 40.93 miles (65.87 km) of track in the previous 12-month period, making up 84% of all new track laid in the state during that time. Later that Fall, reports circulated about possible construction to extend the lines of the DM&N, D&IR and others over Winter, but they were discredited by the press, despite actions by the DM&N to develop a line to Superior, Wisconsin, and a branch to Eveleth completed in December.

Rockefeller sought to use the DM&N to compete with the lines of James J. Hill and William Cornelius Van Horne by extending the railroad westward and hauling more grain and lumber. His plan included construction of 400 miles (640 km) of new line across northern Minnesota to the Red River; there it would connect to a new railroad to be named Winnipeg and Southern Railway to build into Saskatchewan. At the next annual meeting of the DM&N and associated mining companies, held on February 7, 1895, the railroad's contract with Rockefeller to ship 1,000,000 tons of ore was officially cancelled, leaving Rockefeller solely as a shareholder. Following a judgment against Rockefeller in their favor alleging fraud in securing control of the DM&N, the Merritts set up new competition to the DM&N with the incorporation of the Duluth and Northwestern Railroad (D&NW) on September 11, 1895. Rockefeller continued with his plan, hoping to start construction in Spring 1896, while the Merritts also planned to begin construction on the D&NW, following a line surveyed between the DM&N and D&IR at the same time. Other DM&N management changes included the departure of general manager Donald M. Philbin in January 1896; Philbin then took the general superintendent position at the Duluth & Winnipeg Railroad in April. It was believed based on Philbin's move that the D&W may soon fall under the control of Canadian Pacific Railway.

Although not to the extent that Rockefeller planned, the DM&N did start construction in early 1896 on new branches to the Victoria, Adams and Franklin mines. In 1897, DM&N construction was focused on improvements to the existing line including trestle filling and grade lowering projects, and plans were made to build a new coal dock in Duluth that would receive coal, from Rockefeller's ships, for delivery in the area, as well as a 762-foot (232 m) extension to the existing dock. Rockefeller did not abandon his larger plan, and instead built up a company with $12 million in capital for construction that was projected to begin in 1898. But ore shipments in 1897 were down from previous years due to smaller winter stockpiles. Throughout much of 1898, the DM&N and D&IR were involved in a civil case brought by a few independent mine owners in the region; the mine owners alleged that the railroads were giving unfair advantage in rates to the mines that the railroads' parent companies owned. The suit was dropped on November 26, 1898.

With no progress made on construction westward for a connection to Saskatchewan, the announcement was made on February 7, 1899, that Rockefeller would sell his stake in the railroads and mines of the Mesabi Range to the Carnegie Steel Company. Rockefeller sold the DM&N to U.S. Steel in 1901, who operated it as an independent company. In 1906 the DM&N extended its line to Coleraine, and in 1907 extended further to the Canisteo District to service the Canisteo and Orwell mines. The DM&N carried first shipment of iron from Canisteo in 1909.

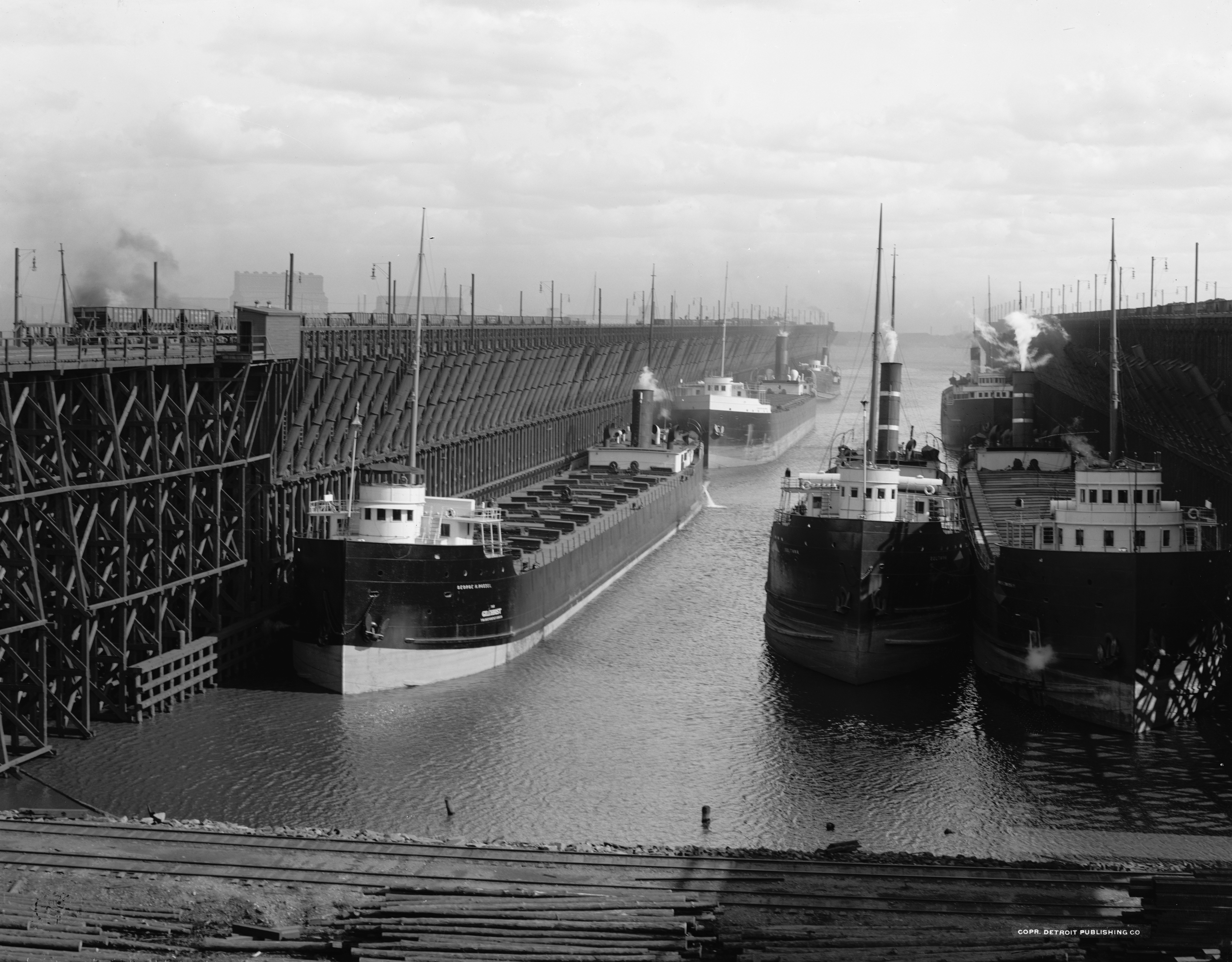
DM&N ore docks at an unspecified date between 1900 and 1915

In order to continue iron ore shipments from Duluth, the DM&N played a big part in developing the St. Louis Bay harbor. The railroad built new ore docks there, including its Dock No. 4 at 2,304 feet (702 m) long with a capacity of 119,274 long tons (121,188 t). The DM&N further dredged the bay to allow larger ore ships to reach its docks from 1905 to 1907.

One 1907 report notes that the DM&N operated 72 locomotives, 5,132 freight cars and 26 passenger cars with a total of 242 miles (389 km) of standard gauge track. Ten years later, a 1917 report notes that most of these statistics had grown, including 117 locomotives, 9,408 freight cars and 22 passenger cars, with 379.14 miles (610.17 km) of track; the DM&N had also leased both the Spirit Lake Transfer Railway and the Interstate Transfer Railway with additional trackage rights agreements with Northern Pacific Railway to reach the Union Depot in Duluth. As of December 31, 1916, the company's total revenue was $14,389,278 with a net surplus of $6,862,169, both increased over the previous two years ($9,909,550 revenue and $4,559,225 surplus in 1915; $4,999,184 revenue and $325,331 surplus in 1914).

On July 1, 1937, the DM&N and the Spirit Lake Transfer Railway were merged to form the Duluth, Missabe and Iron Range Railway.
