= Brian Merritt Bergson =

American politician

Brian Merritt Bergson (born September 4, 1964) was an American politician.

Bergson was born in Minnesota and lived in Osseo, Minnesota. He served in the United States Army and was a businessman. Bergson went to the University of Minnesota and studied geography. Bergson served in the Minnesota House of Representatives in 1993 and 1994 and was a Democrat. His great-uncle Leonidas Merritt also served in the Minnesota Legislature. Later Bergson became a lobbyist for Polaris.
