= Texas and Northern Railway =

American railway

- Texas & Northern map

Overview
- Headquarters: Lone Star, TX
- Reporting mark: TN
- Locale: Lone Star, TX
- Dates of operation: 1948–present

Technical
- Track gauge: 4 ft 8 1/2 in (1,435 mm) standard gauge

The Texas and Northern Railway (reporting mark TN) is an eight-mile (13 km) railroad connecting Lone Star, Texas, to the former Louisiana and Arkansas Railway at Veals Switch between Daingerfield and Hughes Springs. A number of branches have been removed over the years as mining of ore is no longer done. The blast furnace was shut down in the 1980s as well as the ore smelter. Only the electric blast furnace and the pipe rolling mill are still in operation along with warehouse facilities. Operations have been cut back, and since Lone Star was purchased by U.S. Steel, the railroad is managed under that company's railroad division, Transtar, Inc. Traffic consists of outbound pipe, and inbound scrap steel and alloy steel ingots. For years the railroad bought secondhand ALCO diesel locomotives and heavily modified them for their and the steel mill railroad operations.
