= Chicago Central and Pacific Railroad =

US railroad

Chicago Central & Pacific Railroad

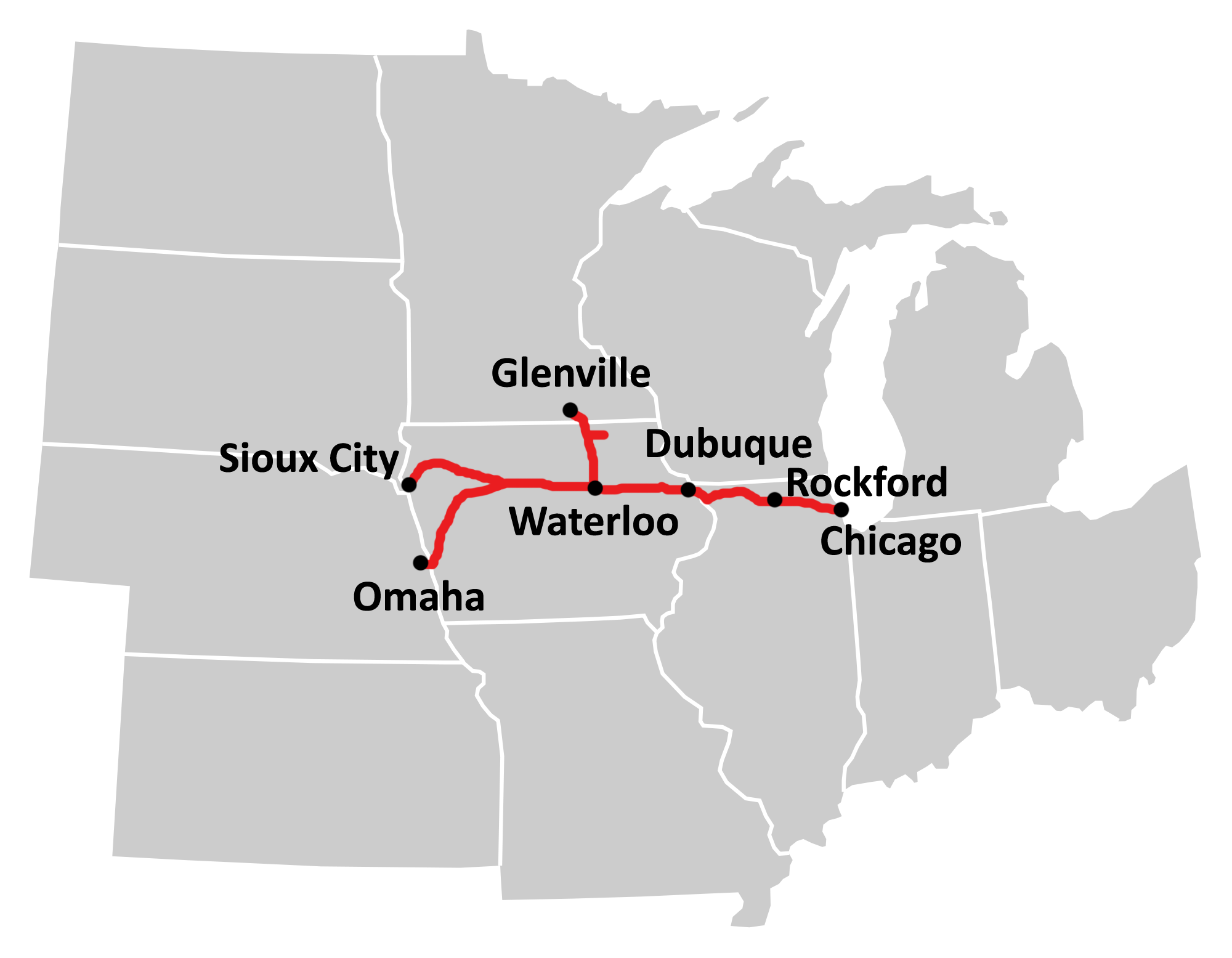
- Chicago Central & Pacific Railroad trackage (CN's Iowa Zone)

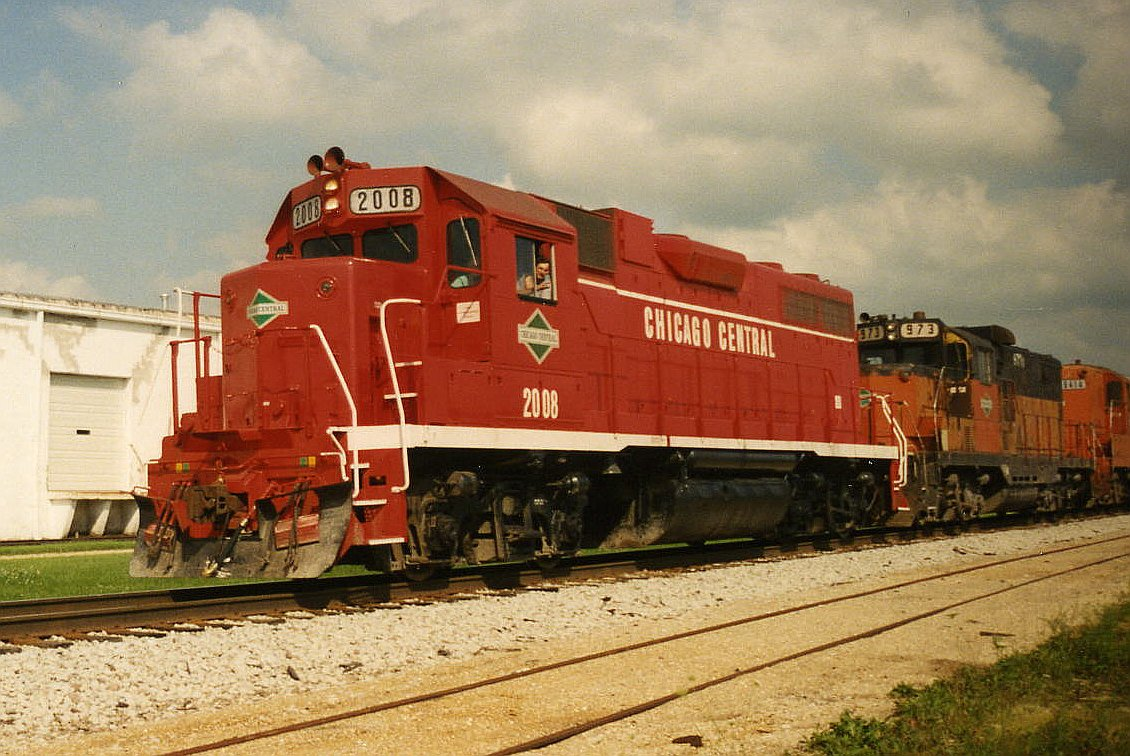
- A Chicago Central train passes westbound through northern Illinois in 1993.

Overview
- Headquarters: Waterloo, Iowa
- Reporting mark: CC
- Locale: Midwestern United States
- Dates of operation: 1985–1999
- Predecessor: Illinois Central Railroad
- Successor: Canadian National Railway

Technical
- Track gauge: 4 ft 8 1/2 in (1,435 mm) standard gauge

Other
- Website: cn.ca

The Chicago Central and Pacific Railroad (reporting mark CC) is part of the Illinois Central Railroad (IC), which is owned by the Canadian National Railway (CN) through the Grand Trunk Corporation. Operationally, the Chicago Central & Pacific is designated as the Iowa Zone of CN's Southern Region.

== History ==
The Iowa Division of the original Illinois Central Railroad began its service to Warren, Illinois in January 1854. By September 1854 the tracks ran to Scales Mound, Illinois and on October 31, 1854, the Illinois Central made it to Galena, Illinois. On June 12, 1855 the tracks were expanded to East Dubuque, Illinois. By December 1868 a drawbridge was built over the Mississippi River to Dubuque, Iowa. The Dubuque Rail Bridge was rebuilt in the 1890s.

With entrepreneur Jack Haley as president and CEO, the Chicago Central & Pacific Railroad was formed by a spin-off from the by-then-named Illinois Central Gulf. Distinct operations began on December 24, 1985.

The IC repurchased the railroad in 1996 and operated it as a subsidiary until the IC itself was purchased by CN three years later. The operation continues as a subsidiary of the Grand Trunk Corporation.

== Structure ==
The railroad was organized into eight subdivisions and other spurs. The subdivisions listed from east to west include the following:

- Freeport Subdivision
- Dubuque Subdivision
- Cedar Rapids Subdivision
- Osage Subdivision
- Waterloo Subdivision
- Omaha Subdivision
- Cherokee Subdivision
- Ida Grove Subdivision
