= Bessemer and Lake Erie Railroad Bridge (Allegheny River) =

Bessemer & Lake Erie Railroad Bridge
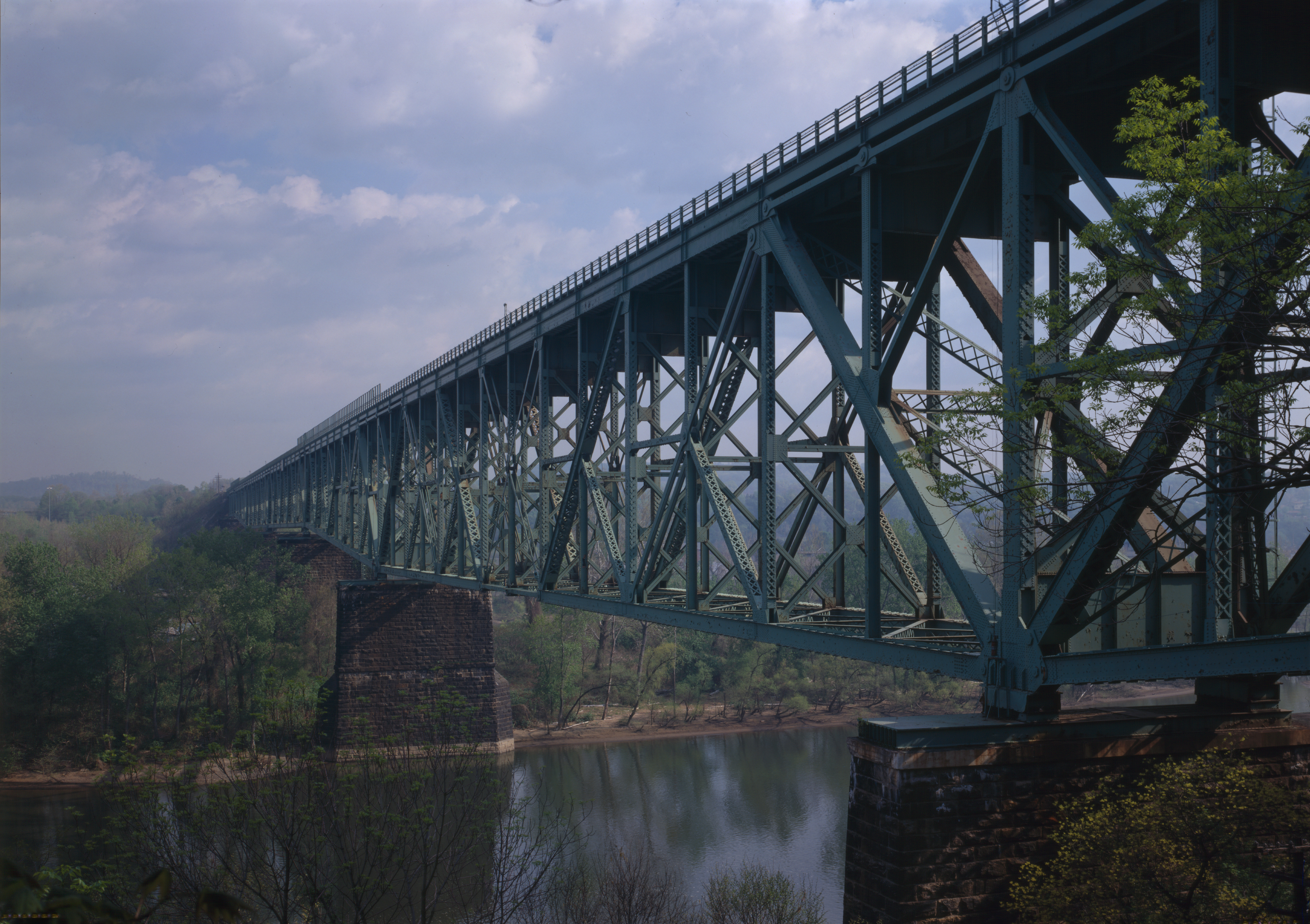
- Coordinates: 40.5376°N 79.8209°W
- Carries: Canadian National Railway Bessemer and Lake Erie Railroad division
- Crosses: Allegheny River
- Locale: Plum, Pennsylvania and Harmar Township, Pennsylvania

Characteristics
- Design: Truss bridge
- Total length: 2,327 feet (709 m)
- Longest span: 520 feet (160 m)
- Clearance below: 89 feet (27 m)

History
- Opened: 1918

The Bessemer & Lake Erie Railroad Bridge is a truss bridge that carries the Canadian National Railway's Bessemer and Lake Erie Railroad division across the Allegheny River between the Pittsburgh suburbs of Plum and Harmar Township, Pennsylvania. In 1897, a single-track trestle and viaduct was built on this site; in 1918, the original piers were doubled in width, the current double-tracked structure built alongside, and then slid into place. The original north trestle approach was buried in slag dumped from an adjacent temporary filling trestle.

== See also ==
- List of bridges documented by the Historic American Engineering Record in Pennsylvania
- List of crossings of the Allegheny River
