= Duluth, Missabe and Iron Range Railway =

Railroad operating in northern Minnesota and Wisconsin

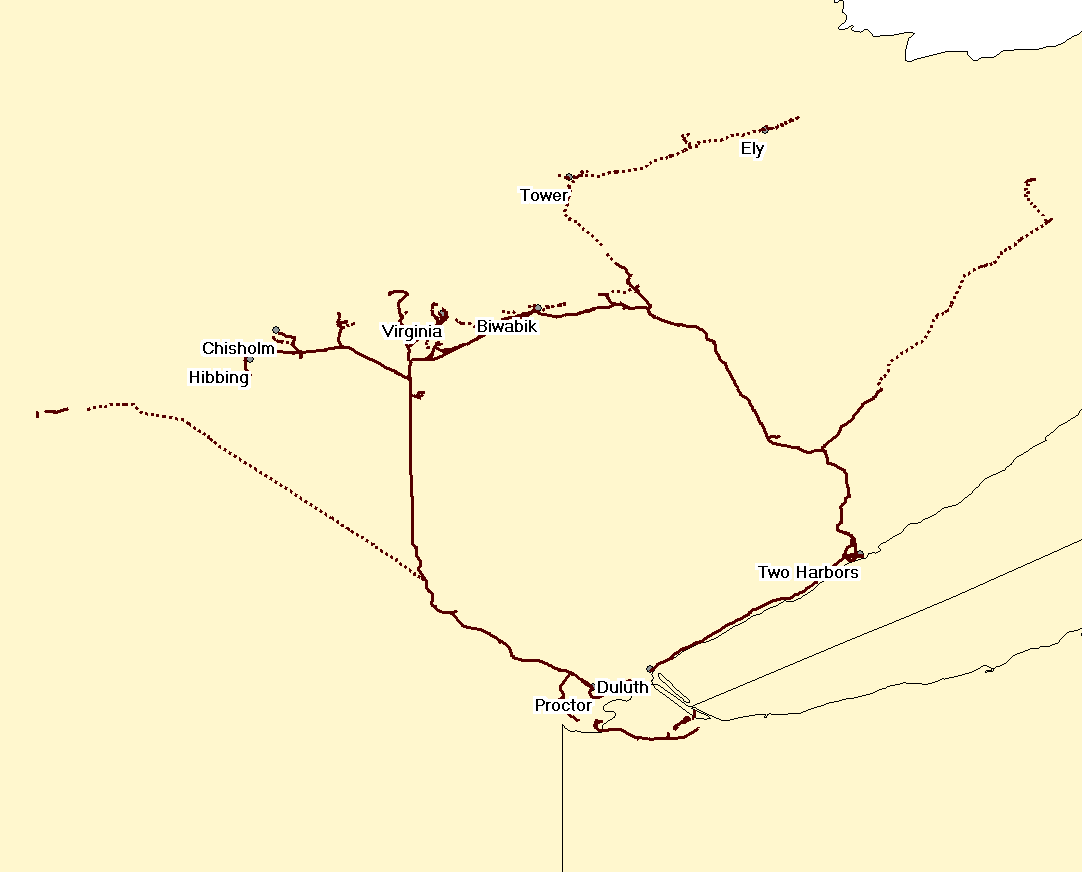
- Map of the DM&IR. Solid lines are track still in use; dotted lines are abandoned track.

Overview
- Headquarters: Proctor, Minnesota
- Reporting mark: DMIR
- Locale: Saint Louis County / Lake County, Minnesota, and Douglas County, Wisconsin, US
- Dates of operation: 1874–2011
- Successor: Canadian National Railway

Technical
- Track gauge: 4 ft 8 1/2 in (1,435 mm) standard gauge

The Duluth, Missabe and Iron Range Railway (DM&IR) (reporting mark DMIR), informally known as the Missabe Road, was a railroad operating in northern Minnesota and Wisconsin (United States) that used to haul iron ore and later taconite to the Great Lakes ports of Duluth and Two Harbors, Minnesota. Control of the railway was acquired on May 10, 2004, by the Canadian National Railway (CN) when it purchased the assets of Great Lakes Transportation.

== History ==
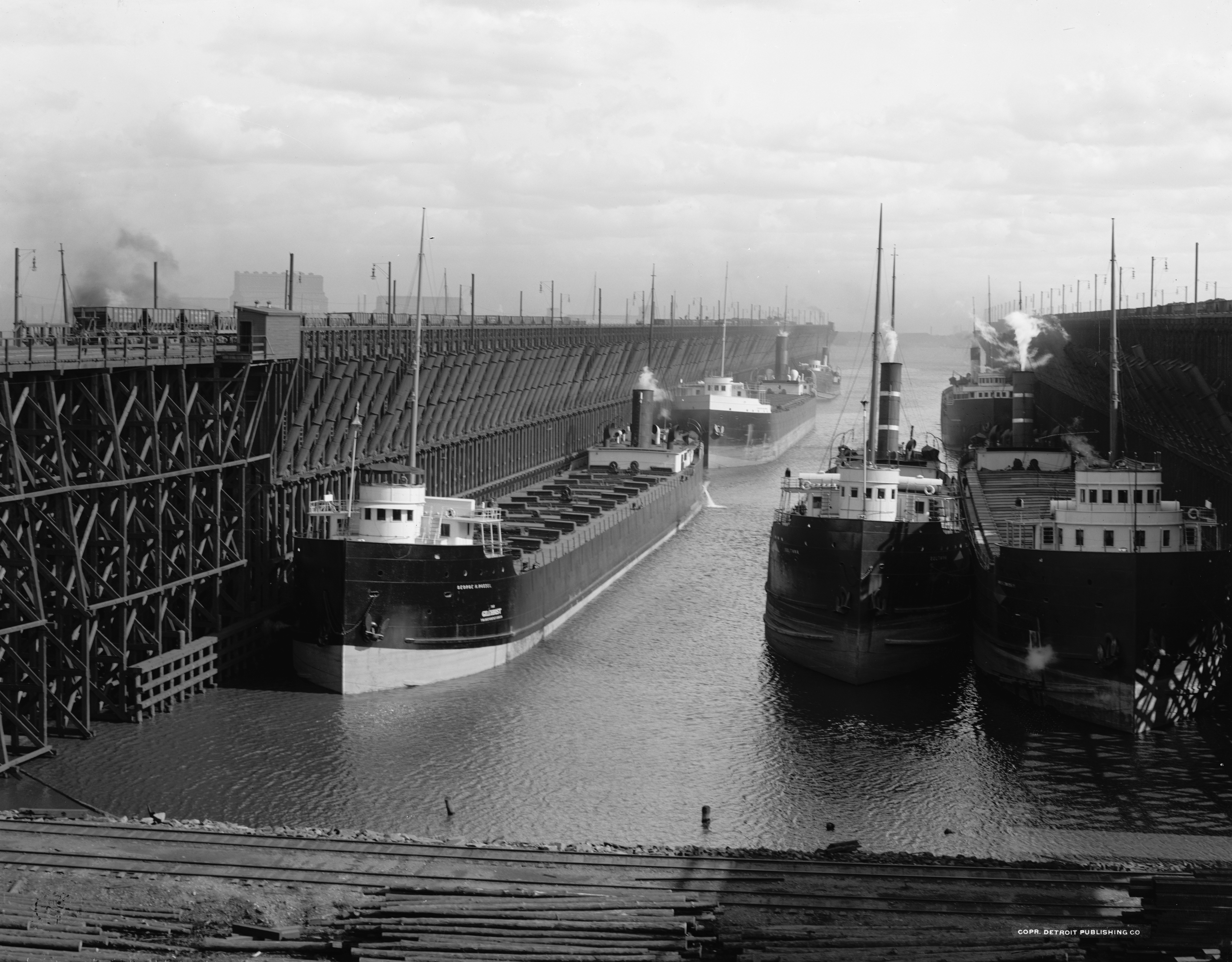
DMIR ore docks loading ships, circa 1900–1915.

The DM&IR was formed by the merger in 1937 of the Duluth, Missabe and Northern Railway (DM&N) and the Spirit Lake Transfer Railway. The following year, the Duluth and Iron Range Rail Road (D&IR) and Interstate Transfer Railway were added. All of these had been leased by the DM&N since 1930.

The D&IR was formed in 1874 by Charlemagne Tower to haul iron ore from the Minnesota Iron Co. in Tower, Minnesota, to the new Lake Superior port of Two Harbors, Minnesota. On July 31, 1884, the D&IR carried its first ore shipment from the Soudan Mine. In 1887, the D&IR was acquired by Illinois Steel Company, which itself became part of the new United States Steel Corporation (USS) in 1901.

After high-grade Mesabi iron ore was discovered near Mountain Iron, Minnesota, by the Seven Iron Men, the D&IR was asked to build a branch line to serve this area, but declined. So in 1891, the Merritts incorporated the DM&N, which shipped its first load of iron ore to Superior, Wisconsin, in October 1892. The following year, the Merritts expanded the DM&N by laying track to Duluth, Minnesota, where they built an ore dock. But this expansion left the Merritts on shaky financial ground, and in 1894, John D. Rockefeller gained control of the railway. In 1901, Rockefeller sold the DM&N to USS.

From 1901 to 1938, the two railways were owned by USS and operated separately. Total ore hauled by the two railroads peaked in 1929 at 27,600,000 long tons (28,000,000 tonnes; 30,900,000 short tons) and dropped to 1,500,000 long tons (1,500,000 t; 1,700,000 short tons) in 1932.

=== Merger ===
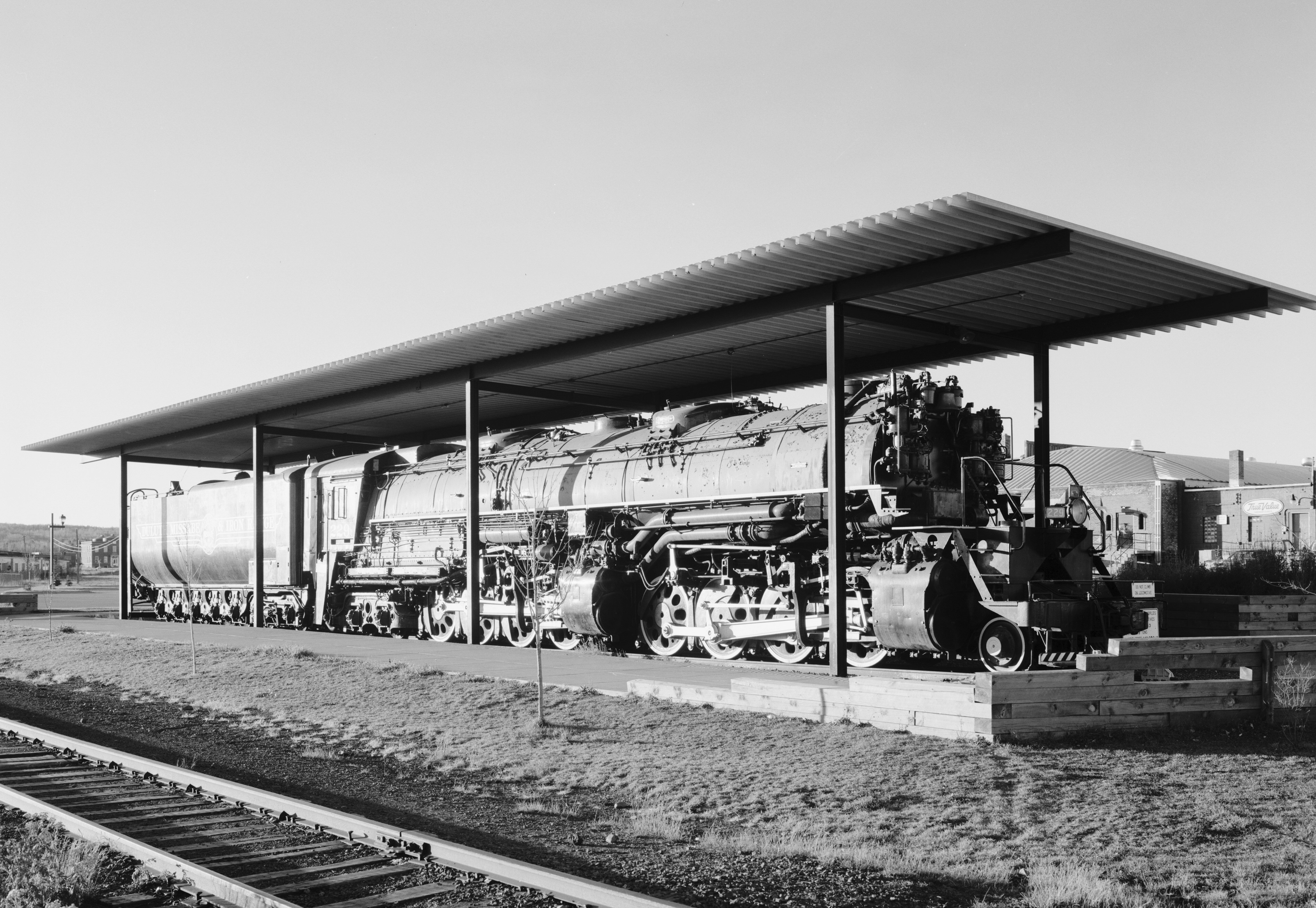
One of the DM&IR's 2-8-8-4 locomotives preserved in Two Harbors, Minnesota

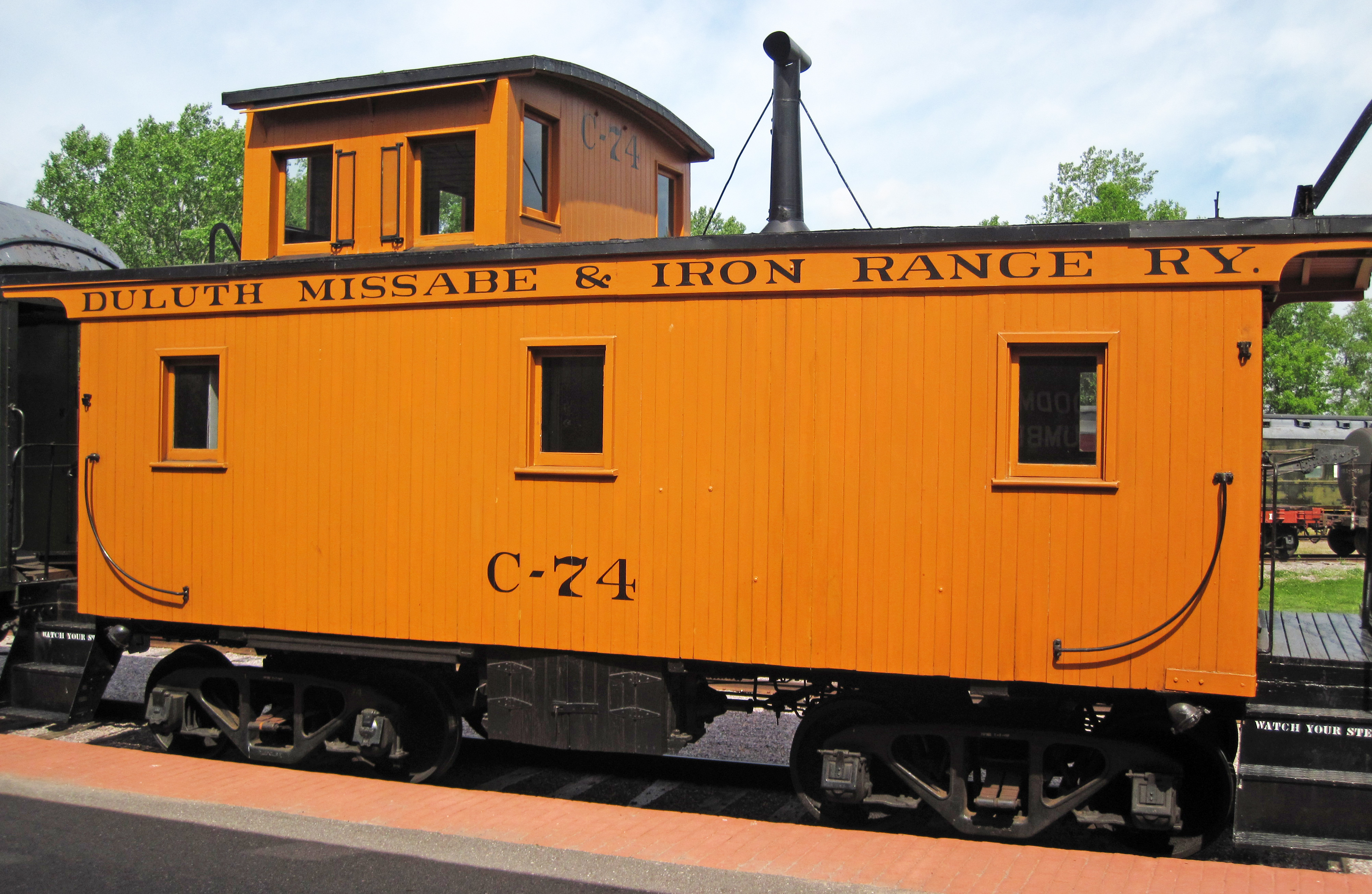
Caboose C-74, built in 1924, operating in train service at Mid-Continent Railway Museum.

By July 1938, the two railways merged to form the DM&IR. The two operating divisions, the Missabe and the Iron Range, were based upon the predecessor roads. As the United States entered the Second World War, the iron ore tonnage moving over the Missabe Road accelerated from a little over 8,000,000 long tons (8,100,000 t; 9,000,000 short tons) in 1938, past 18,000,000 long tons (18,000,000 t; 20,000,000 short tons) in 1939, then to almost 28,000,000 long tons (28,000,000 t; 31,000,000 short tons) in 1940 and past 37,000,000 long tons (38,000,000 t; 41,000,000 short tons) in 1941.

The first eight of DM&IR's class M 2-8-8-4 Yellowstone locomotives were delivered by Baldwin Locomotive Works in spring 1941. As well as the Yellowstones, the DM&IR had heavy 2-8-8-2 articulateds (also Class M), 2-8-2 Mikados, 2-10-2 Santa Fe's and eventually 2-10-4 Texas types from B&LE. Ore movement was nearly 45,000,000 long tons (46,000,000 t; 50,000,000 short tons) in 1942 and the War Production Board allowed the Missabe to order ten more Yellowstones, delivered in 1943. The 2-8-8-4's were slowly retired in the latter half of the '50s and the last remaining served until around 1960.

=== Dieselization and post-war growth ===
After World War II, the DM&IR hauled increasing tonnage to the ore docks along Lake Superior, reaching a record of over 49 million tons in 1953. That year the first diesel locomotives, EMD SW9s, arrived on the railway. In 1954, a set of Baldwin DR-4-4-15 "Sharknose" diesels arrived from the Elgin, Joliet and Eastern (a fellow U.S. Steel railroad), though they were returned to Baldwin Locomotive Works when the EJ&E contract expired in 1955. Dieselization continued with the purchase of several EMD SD9 road switchers the following year, while the last revenue steam run occurred in 1962.

Passenger service on the Missabe division ended in 1957 and completely ceased system-wide in 1961.

Revenue freight traffic, in millions of net ton-miles (DM&N plus D&IR)
| Year | Traffic |
|---|---|
| 1925 | 2,115 |
| 1933 | 806 |
| 1944 | 3,733 |
| 1960 | 2,696 |
| 1970 | 2,202 |

As the supply of high-quality iron ore dwindled, mines and pits were closing across Minnesota's iron ranges. The DM&IR's ore docks in Two Harbors closed in 1963 and did not reopen until 1966. The Missabe Road was saved by the passage on November 3, 1963, of the Taconite Amendment to the Minnesota State Constitution (the amendment restricted the state's ability to tax a taconite industry for 25 years). The passage of the amendment accelerated the creation of the taconite mining industry in Northern Minnesota. The Eveleth Taconite Company was formed in 1964 and on April 8, 1966, the SS Edmund Fitzgerald took on the first load of Eveleth taconite pellets, about 23,000 long tons (23,000 t; 26,000 short tons). The taconite era on the Missabe had begun.

=== Ownership and CN merger ===
In 1988, U.S. Steel, now USX, spun off the DM&IR and their other ore railroads and shipping companies into the subsidiary Transtar, then sold majority control to the Blackstone Group and USX. In 2001, the DM&IR and other holdings were spun off from Transtar into the company Great Lakes Transportation (GLT), which was fully owned by the Blackstone Group. For the first time in more than 100 years DM&IR was no longer associated with U.S. Steel. In late 2003, the Blackstone Group agreed to sell GLT to Canadian National Railway and the purchase was completed on May 10, 2004.

== Merger with Wisconsin Central ==
In December 2011, the Duluth, Missabe & Iron Range Railway was merged into Wisconsin Central Ltd., which is also controlled by Canadian National Railway. This merger was intended to increase efficiency.
