= Elgin, Joliet and Eastern Railway =

Defunct Class I railroad serving the outer Chicago suburbs

- EJ&E (red) and Canadian National Railway (blue) as of 2008

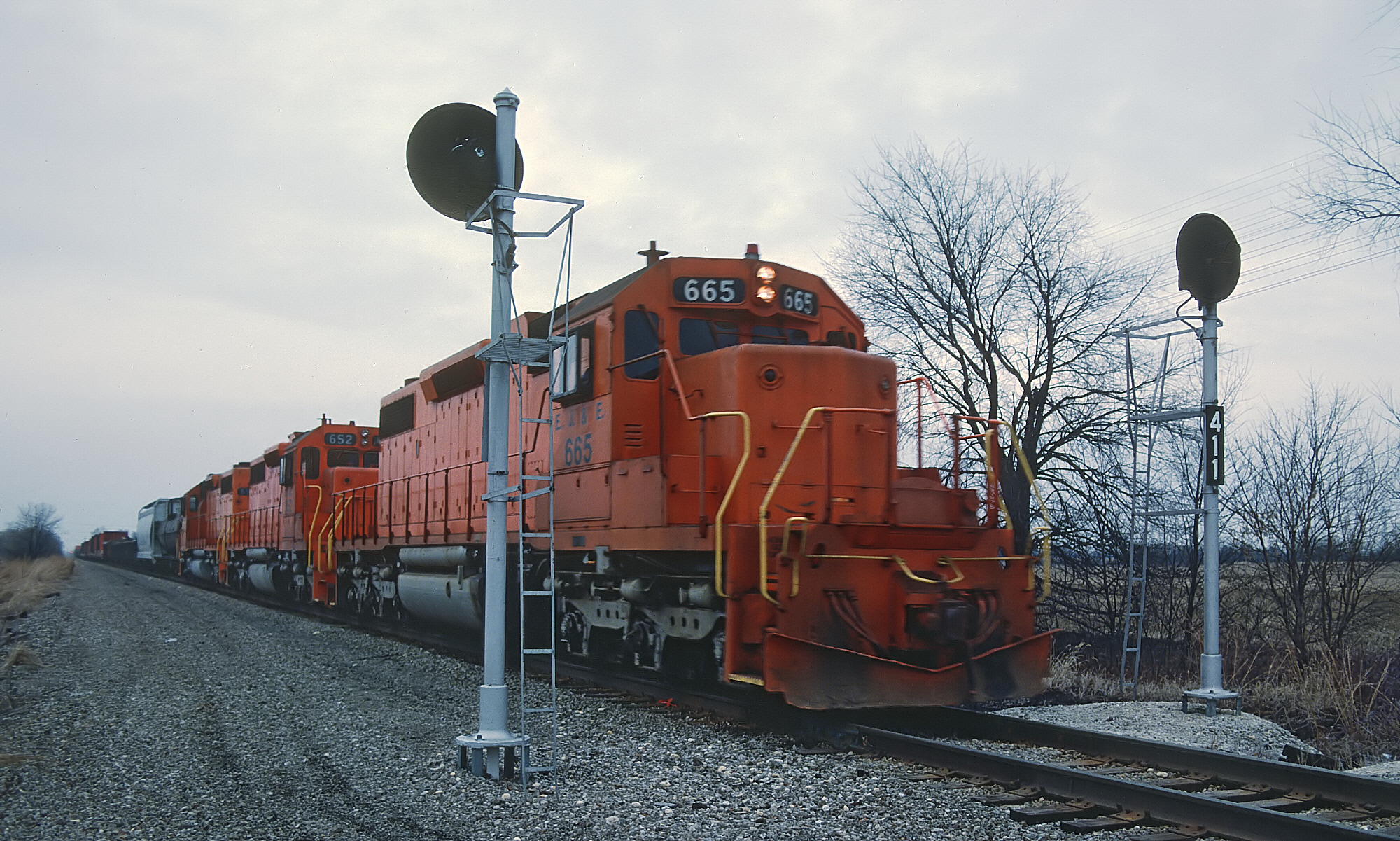
- EJE 665, an EMD SD38-2, at West Chicago on December 14, 1987

Overview
- Headquarters: Gary, Indiana
- Reporting mark: EJE
- Locale: Illinois and Indiana
- Dates of operation: January 1, 1889–January 1, 2013
- Predecessor: Joliet, Aurora & Northern Railway; Elgin, Joliet & Eastern Railway Company of Illinois
- Successor: Canadian National Railway, Wisconsin Central Ltd.

Technical
- Track gauge: 4 ft 8 1/2 in (1,435 mm) standard gauge
- Length: 164 miles (264 km)

The Elgin, Joliet and Eastern Railway (reporting mark EJE) was a Class II railroad, making a roughly circular path between Waukegan, Illinois and Gary, Indiana. The railroad served as a link between Class I railroads traveling to and from Chicago, although it operated almost entirely within the city's suburbs, only entering Chicago where it served the U.S. Steel South Works on the shores of Lake Michigan. Nicknames for the railroad included "The J", EJ&E and "The Chicago Outer Belt Line". At the end of 1970, the EJ&E operated 164 miles of track and carried 848 million ton-miles of revenue freight in that year alone.

On September 26, 2007, the Canadian National Railway announced that it planned to purchase a majority of the EJ&E, leaving a portion of the line in Indiana to be reorganized as the Gary Railway. The purchase was approved on December 24, 2008, by the U.S. Surface Transportation Board, and the deal was consummated effective February 1, 2009. In the years immediately following the merger, the railroad existed as a subsidiary of Canadian National, and EJ&E locomotives that had been repainted into CN colors were sub-lettered for the EJ&E.

On December 31, 2012, Canadian National announced that the merger of the EJ&E into Wisconsin Central Ltd. (another railroad subsidiary of CN) had been completed, and would take effect the following day. On January 1, 2013, the EJ&E effectively ceased to exist, 124 years to the day it was founded.

== History ==
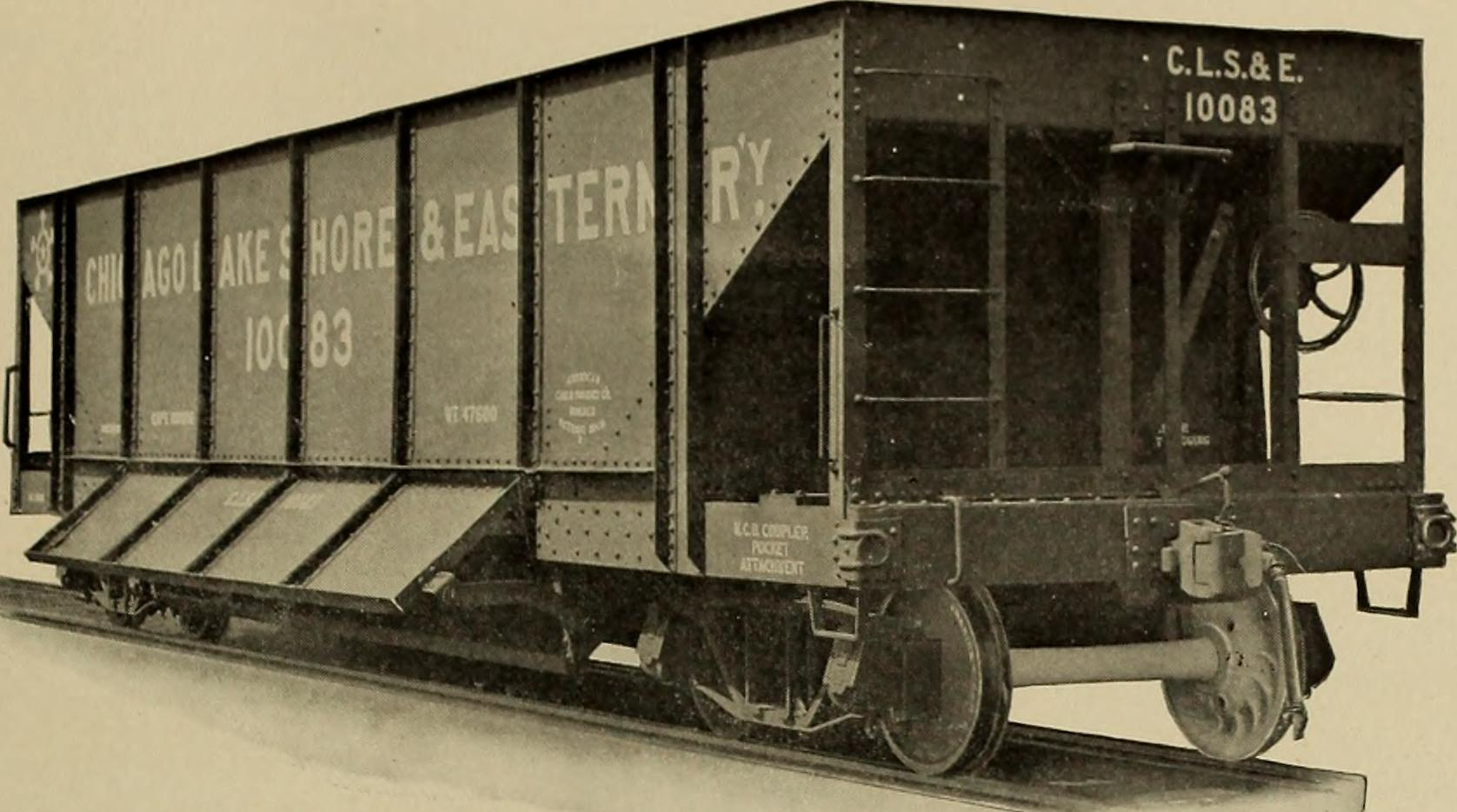
Hopper car from the Chicago, Lake Shore & Eastern Railway

The Elgin, Joliet and Eastern was created when several local railroads in Illinois and Indiana merged throughout the end of the 19th century. The systems that would make up the EJ&E included the Joliet, Aurora & Northern Railway (which dates back to 1884) and Elgin, Joliet & Eastern Railway Company of Illinois. The Elgin, Joliet and Eastern Railway began operations on December 4, 1888, through the merger of these two systems. After the creation of the modern-day EJ&E, the railroad expanded by purchasing several smaller lines including the Waukegan & Southwestern Railway; Gardner, Coal City & Northern Railway; Western Indiana Railroad; and the Chicago, Lake Shore & Eastern Railway.

The EJ&E moved to serve industries in the Hammond-East Chicago-Whiting industrial district by acquiring trackage rights in 1894. Construction of the present line to Gary, Whiting and South Chicago was initiated in 1899 by the Griffith and Northern Railway. Connections with the Chicago, Lake Shore and Eastern Railway and the Western Indiana Railway further penetrated the district, although the EJ&E subsequently acquired both lines. In 1898 the EJ&E merged with four other non-railway companies to form Federal Steel Company. In 1901, United States Steel Corporation was formed from a merger that included Federal Steel, and U.S. Steel thereby acquired the railroad.

The railroad's passenger services began with the start of operations in January 1889. The railroad stopped operating passenger trains in 1907, but continued mixed train service until 1909. During those two years, passengers rode in the caboose.

The EJ&E underwent dieselization relatively early. In 1937, the railroad acquired its first diesel-electric locomotive, an EMC SW switcher, which was designated EJ&E #200. Over the next 12 years, the entire steam fleet was replaced with first generation diesels. The first road diesel, Baldwin DT-6-6-2000 #100, was delivered to the railroad in May 1946. The final steam movement occurred in late May 1949, led by a Mikado 2-8-2, EJ&E #740. The locomotive was sold to the scrapper that September. Another 2-8-2, #765, which had been sold to the Duluth, Missabe and Iron Range Railway in 1948, is the railway's only surviving steam locomotive. It was donated to Gary, Indiana in 1962 and has been on static display in Lakefront Park, next to I-90 and the South Shore Line's Gary station ever since. The Illinois Railway Museum attempted to purchase the engine in the early 1980s, but Gary refused this offer.

In 1988, United States Steel and the Blackstone Group formed Transtar Inc. to serve as a shareholder of the EJ&E and several other affiliated railroads and companies. In March 2001, the Blackstone Group ended their ownership interest in Transtar, resulting in it becoming a fully owned subsidiary of United States Steel.

On May 16, 2006, the EJ&E was the recipient of the 2005 Bronze E. H. Harriman Award for employee safety in group C (line-haul railroads with less than 4 million employee hours per year).

=== Canadian National/Gary Railway ===
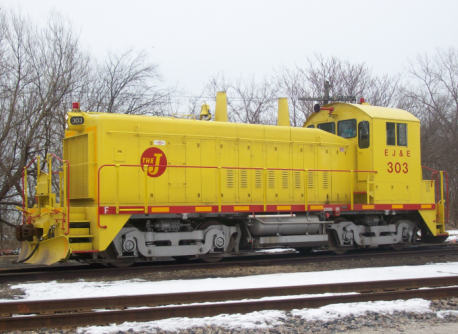
EJ&E #303, an EMD SW1200 locomotive, repainted in Gary Railway colors in March 2008.

In 2004 Canadian National had acquired two railroads, the Duluth, Missabe and Iron Range Railroad and the Bessemer and Lake Erie Railroad, that had also previously been owned by Transtar, but that at the time CN acquired them were owned by Great Lakes Transportation, LLC, a Blackstone Group subsidiary created when USS became the sole owner of Transtar). The purchase agreement was officially announced on September 26; CN would purchase the majority of the line. The purchase was initially expected to close in mid-2008, valued at $300 million.

In accordance with its agreement with CN, Transtar retained some railroad infrastructure in Gary, Indiana; this infrastructure has been reorganized as the Gary Railway (“GRW”) to continue serving U.S. Steel's plants located there.

On September 10, 2007, Crain's Chicago Business reported that the Canadian National Railway was in talks to purchase the EJ&E. Canadian National planned to use the EJ&E to route through trains around Chicago, where they had been facing lengthy delays because of congestion in the busy rail hub. In fact, the closing did not take place until January 31, 2009 (effective February 1, 2009), following regulatory approval of the purchase by the Surface Transportation Board on December 24, 2008.

On Tuesday, March 10, 2009, the first two Canadian National trains debuted on the Elgin, Joliet, & Eastern, with initial plans to run six trains per day on the lines. The CN subsequently did major upgrading of the physical plant, and in particular of several major interchange points. In 2024 it was reported that about a third of all CN trains originated, terminated or ran through Chicago. Most of the latter skirted the Windy City's congestion by zipping around on the EJ&E.

In November 2020, as part of celebrations for the 25th anniversary of CN's privatization, the company unveiled a series of locomotives repainted in the schemes of its predecessor and/or subsidiary railroads. GE ET44AC #3023, which was repainted in the orange livery of EJ&E, along with the logos of that company.

== Motive power ==
=== All-time diesel roster ===
The EJ&E's all time diesel roster consisted of:

Image	Locomotive Model	Quantity	Road Numbers	Notes
	Alco HH660	4	209–212	
	Alco HH900	1	402	
	Alco RS-2	10	800–809	Locomotive #801 was eventually sold to Hylsamex, and as of 2012 was still operating. Believed to be the oldest operating diesel locomotive in Mexico.
	Alco S-1	5	213–217	
	Alco S-2	12	451–462	
	Baldwin DR-4-4-1500	2 A–B sets	700A, 700B, 701A, 701B	"Sharknose" body
	Baldwin DRS-6-6-1500	2	500–501	
	Baldwin DT-6-6-2000	27	100–126	Locomotive #100 was a unique prototype. All were sold and scrapped by 1974 replaced by the EMD SD38-2 fleet.
	Baldwin VO660	3	270–272	
	Baldwin VO1000	10	475–484	
	**EMD GP38-2**	5	700–704	Sold to the Birmingham Southern Railroad in 1987. In 1996, locomotive #703 was repurchased and assigned to Waukegan, IL.
	EMD SD9	15	600–614	
	**EMD SD18**	5	615, 616, 818, 851, 852	#818 upgraded to SD18U.
	**EMD SD9M**	8	802, 804, 809, 811, 813–815, 820	Ex-Duluth, Missabe and Iron Range. Rebuilt from EMD SD9s in 1990.
	**EMD SD38**	6	650–655	650 sold to CITI rail as of 2011,654 sold to Hartwell Railroad as of 2012, 651–653,655 sold to DM&IR in 1992/3
	**EMD SD38-2**	21	656–675,	All still active under Canadian National Ownership, 658,664,666,668,670 Re-painted to CN colors
	EMC NC	1	402	
	EMC NW1	2	400, 401	
	**EMC/EMD NW2**	52	403–443, 408, 446–452, 450, 455, 458	There were two separate EMD NW2 locomotives designated #450, though not at the same time. One EJE 450 is possessed by Gary Railway but out of service in US Steel Gary Works.
	EMD SW	9	200–208	First diesel locomotives on the EJ&E.
	EMD SW1	30	220–249	
	EMD SW1000	1	459	
	**EMD SW1001**	3	444–446	444 and 445 to LTEX 444–445. 446 to CN 446
	**EMD SW1200**	23	300–307, 310–324	EJ&E #315 was involved in an accident in 2000 and was subsequently scrapped in 2003. 300–305, 307 to Gary Railway. 306 to LTEX 306. 310-324 from Burlington Northern.
	EMD SW8	1	457	
	EMD SW9	2	454, 456	
	EMD SW900	1	453	
	**EMD SW1500**	1	460	
	EMD TR4	1	308/309	Rebuilt from a UP cow–calf set; calf made into a cow unit

Locomotive designations in bold indicate that these models were on the roster at the time of the railroad's sale to the Canadian National Railway.

== Communities ==
The EJ&E connects the following cities and large towns:

- Waukegan, Illinois
- Libertyville, Illinois
- Vernon Hills, Illinois
- Lake Zurich, Illinois
- Barrington, Illinois
- Hoffman Estates, Illinois
- Elgin, Illinois
- West Chicago, Illinois
- Aurora, Illinois
- Plainfield, Illinois
- Crest Hill, Illinois
- Joliet, Illinois
- Minooka, Illinois
- Morris, Illinois
- New Lenox, Illinois
- Mokena, Illinois
- Frankfort, Illinois
- Richton Park, Illinois
- Chicago Heights, Illinois
- Park Forest, Illinois
- Griffith, Indiana
- Gary, Indiana

== See also ==
- Belt Railway Company of Chicago
- Indiana Harbor Belt Railroad
- Gary Railway
