= Gary Railway =

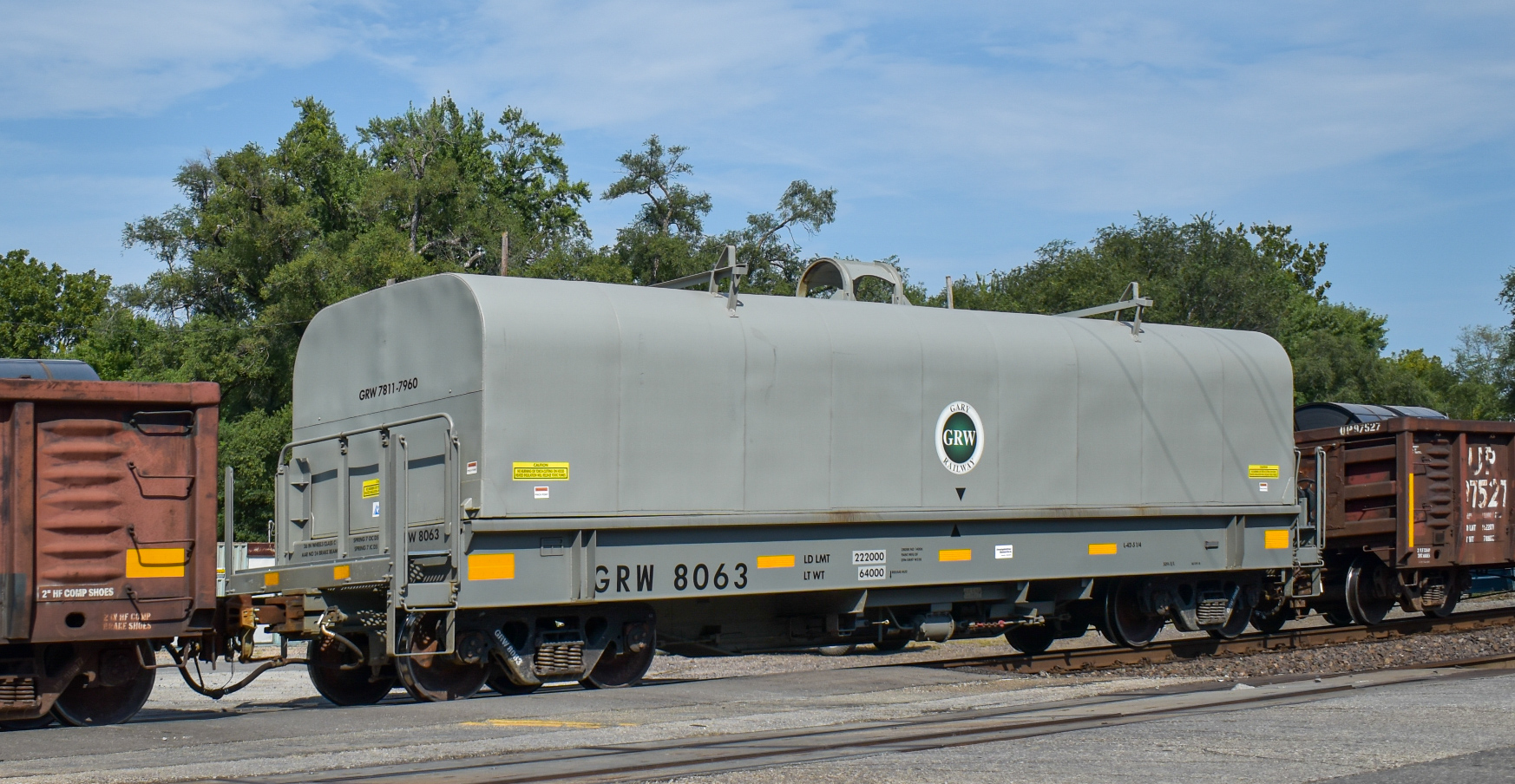
- GRW 8063, a coil steel car, on a freight train in Lawrence, Kansas

Overview
- Headquarters: Gary, Indiana
- Reporting mark: GRW
- Locale: Lake County, Indiana
- Dates of operation: 2009–
- Predecessor: Elgin, Joliet and Eastern Railway

Technical
- Track gauge: 4 ft 8 1/2 in (1,435 mm) standard gauge

The Gary Railway (reporting mark GRW) is owned and operated by Transtar, Inc. It currently runs along 63 miles of yard track throughout Gary, Indiana as a class III switching carrier for local steel supply. The Gary Railway is the successor to the Elgin, Joliet and Eastern Railway after Canadian National Railway purchased the majority of the former EJE and finalized the deal on February 1, 2009.

Currently the Gary Railway's primary customer is the U.S. Steel works in Gary, Indiana. However, it also serves four additional steel processing groups: Cleveland-Cliffs, Tube City IMS, Brandenburg Industrial, and the Levy Company. The railway interchanges with Canadian National at Gary as well as several other Class I rail carriers connected along the lines of the former Elgin, Joliet and Eastern Railway.
