= Leonidas Merritt =

American politician and businessman

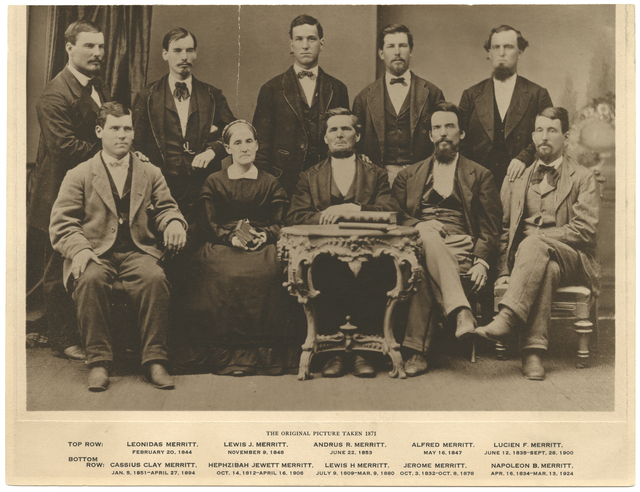
1871 photograph of the Merritt family. Top row: Leonidas Merritt, Lewis J. Merritt, Andrus R. Merritt, Alfred Merritt, Lucien F. Merritt. Bottom row: Cassius Clay Merritt, Hephzibah Jewett Merritt, Lewis H. Merritt, Jerome Merritt, Napoleon B. Merritt.

Leonidas Merritt (February 20, 1844 – August 9, 1926) was an American politician and businessman and one of the Seven Iron Brothers, iron ore pioneers.

Merriitt was born in Chautauqua County, New York. He moved to Minnesota in 1856 and settled in Oneota (Duluth) which was annexed to Duluth, Minnesota. Merritt was involved in the railroad, banking, and mining businesses. Merritt served in the Minnesota Cavalry Company B during the American Civil War. He served on the West Duluth, Minnesota Village Council and as the Duluth, Minnesota Commissioner of Finance from 1921 to 1925. Merritt served in the Minnesota House of Representatives in 1893 and 1894 and was a Republican. His great-nephew Brian Merritt Bergson also served in the Minnesota Legislature.

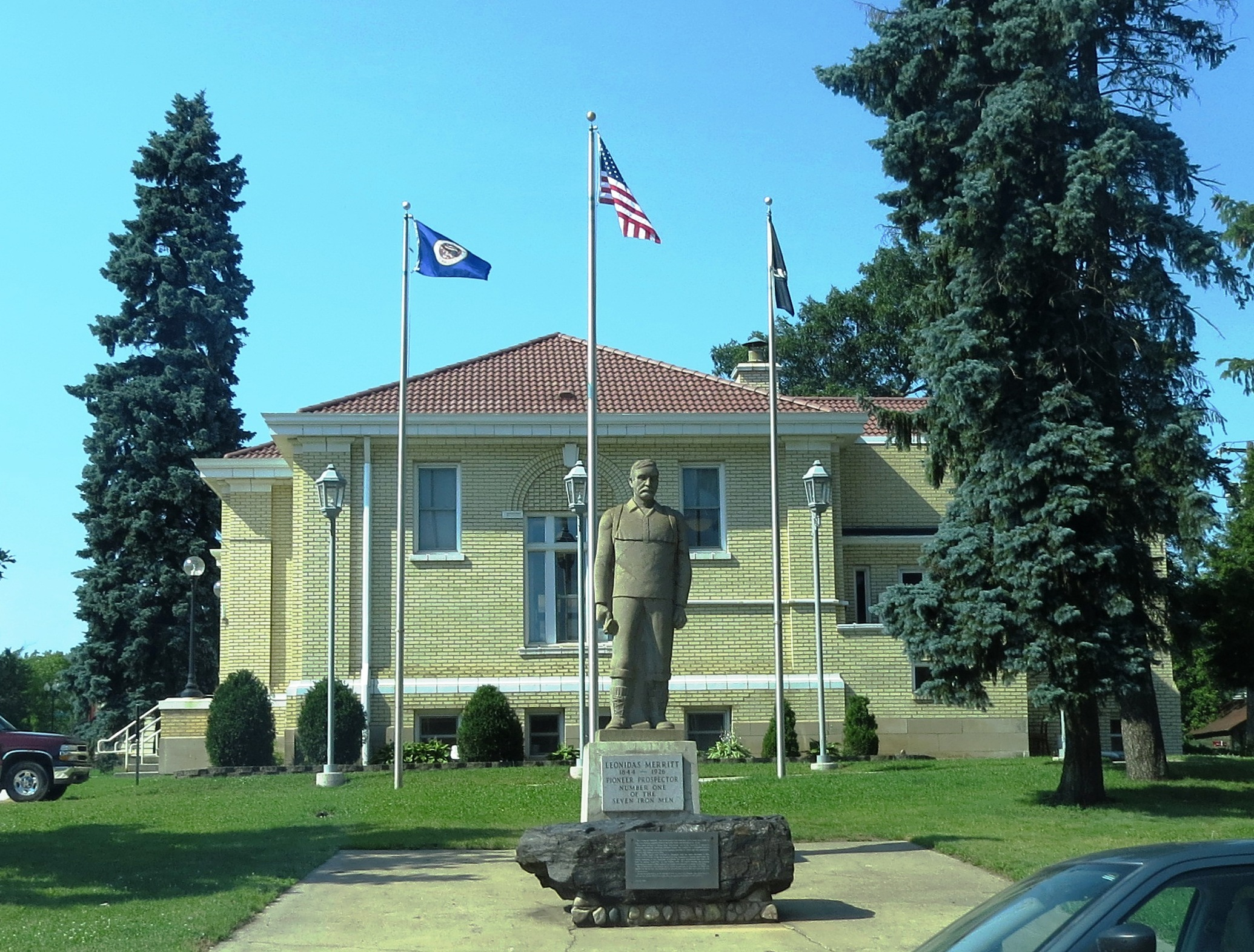
Statue of Leonidas Merritt in Mountain Iron, Minnesota.
