= Seven Iron Brothers =

1800s iron-ore pioneers in Minnesota, US

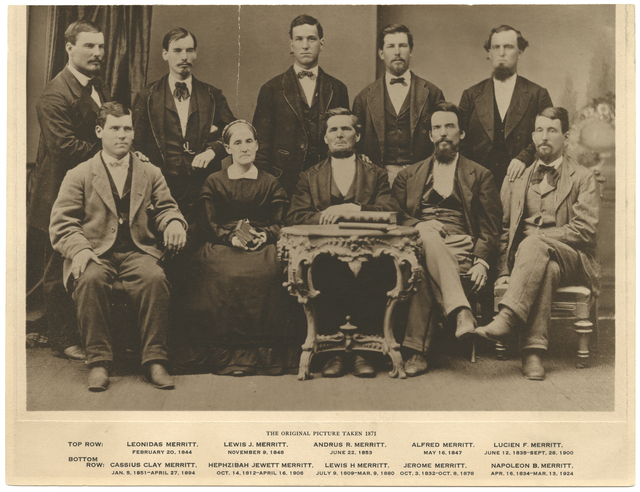
1871 photograph of the Merritt family. Top row: Leonidas Merritt, Lewis J. Merritt, Andrus R. Merritt, Alfred Merritt, Lucien F. Merritt. Bottom row: Cassius Clay Merritt, Hephzibah Jewett Merritt, Lewis H. Merritt, Jerome Merritt, Napoleon B. Merritt.

The Merritt brothers, also known as the Seven Iron Men, were iron ore pioneers in the Mesabi Range in northeastern Minnesota. They attempted to create a large iron ore empire by purchasing or leasing enormous amounts of land in 1890 and 1891. They founded the Mountain Iron Mine in 1891, but sold their lease on the property within a year to raise cash for other operations. They founded the Duluth, Missabe and Northern Railway in 1891 to move ore to port, but in the process nearly bankrupted themselves. John D. Rockefeller agreed to rescue them financially, and over a period of two years (aided by the Panic of 1893) took control of their mining operations and railroad. The Merritts sued, and lost.

== Early life ==
The "brothers" were actually a group of related family members consisting of four of the sons of Lewis Howell Merritt: Leonidas, Alfred, Andrus, and Cassius. The remaining three members were Lewis's grandsons, John, Wilbur, and Bert. The primary figure of the Merritt family was Leonidas. He was born in Chautauqua County, New York, in 1844 and lived there until 1851 when the family moved to western Pennsylvania. In 1856, his family moved to Duluth, Minnesota. The Treaty of La Pointe had recently transferred land from the Ojibwe, and only five or six white families lived in the village at the time. Lewis Howell Merritt worked as a lumberman and a millwright. He joined the U.S. Army to fight in the Civil War, and after the war returned to Minnesota. Lewis prospected for but failed to discover gold in the Vermillion or Mesabi Mountain Ranges. The black "banded ore" rocks that he brought back to Duluth from the Mesabi Range convinced Leonidas to explore the Mesabi Mountains for iron ore.

Leonidas magnetically surveyed and mapped out iron ore troughs in the area. Together, the Merritts charted the Mesabi Range in 1891 and recorded the areas that demonstrated the highest potential for iron. With money saved from 16 years working as a lumberjack, Leonidas bought land for $1.25 an acre ($45 in 2025 dollars). The family also borrowed recklessly to snatch up an immense amount of other land they felt held ore.

== Mountain Iron Mine ==
In 1891, the Merritts leased state-owned land in section 8, township 58 north, range 17 west in St. Louis County, Minnesota (now the Mountain Iron Mine). Their agent, John G. Cohoe, sank a test pit on the property in March 1892 and immediately struck a large iron ore deposit a few feet beneath the surface. The Merritts, meanwhile, had discovered a large number of deposits on numerous properties they now owned, but lacked the capital to exploit them all.

In March 1892, Henry W. Oliver, a Pittsburgh pig iron manufacturer, was in Minneapolis to oversee preparations for the 1892 Republican National Convention. He decided to make a side trip to the Mesabi Iron Range, which had been undergoing an enormous mining boom for the past two years. Oliver visited the Mountain Iron Mine site and was so impressed that he immediately leased it from the Merritts.

== Constructing the Duluth, Missabe and Northern Railway ==
Eager to begin mining on all their properties at once, the Merritts co-founded or invested in the Biwabik Mountain Iron Co., Great Northern Mining Co., Great Western Mining Co., Missabe Mountain Iron Co., Mountain Iron Co., and Shaw Mining Co. (Note: According to historian Allan Nevins, the Merritts owned only about 40 percent of the stock in each of these companies. The Merritts claimed this was enough to control each firm.) The Merritts also invested in the Missabe & Northern Townsite Company.

The Merritts initially cut a trail through the forest to allow wagons to move their ore to the port of Duluth, Minnesota. Wagons, however, could not move the immense amount of ore that the Merritts anticipated mining, so in 1891 the family incorporated the Duluth, Missabe and Northern Railway (DM&N). The line, which opened in 1892, ran about 66 miles (106 km) before connecting to the Duluth and Winnipeg Railroad. The Duluth & Winnipeg then delivered the ore to its dock in Superior, Wisconsin. The DM&N cost $660,000 (equivalent to $21,123,000 in 2025) to build, but the Merritts had a great deal of difficulty obtaining financing. They sold all the stock in the railroad, but only at a steep discount from its par value of $1.2 million (equivalent to $38,406,000 in 2025). Still needing money, the Merritts sold first mortgage bonds to raise the rest. There were so few buyers, the bonds had to be sold at a steep discount as well, and the Merritts ended up selling $1.2 million (equivalent to $38,406,000 in 2025) in bonds. Charles H. Wetmore, a young financier based in New York City, sold the bonds on their behalf. The Merritts themselves only held 20 percent of the stock and 20 percent of the bonds. Despite the large expenditure of money, the railroad only had a dirt track for a roadbed and was poorly constructed. By late 1892, the Merritts were $2 million (equivalent to $64,010,000 in 2025) in debt.

Unwilling to pay for trackage rights as well as freight charges to the Duluth & Winnipeg, the Merritts wanted to extend their railroad another 29 miles (47 km) to Duluth and build ore docks there. Other investors in the railroad, such as contractors and bankers, seeing the mismanaged construction of the initial 66 miles and preferring that the Merritts focus on mining instead, did not want to extend the line.

The Merritts bought out those partners most opposed to the extension, which cost them $665,000 (equivalent to $21,283,000 in 2025). They paid for this by giving the sellers promissory notes due in one year.

The Merritts still needed $1.6 million to build their extension.

== Involvement with Rockefeller ==
John D. Rockefeller, co-founder and president of Standard Oil, was one of the richest men in the world by 1890. Money came in so fast, Rockefeller had difficulty spending it quickly enough on new investments or on charitable endeavors. He came to rely on Charles Colby and Colgate Hoyt, two men who worshipped at the same church which Rockefeller attended, and allowed them to make investments on his behalf. By 1892, Colby and Hoyt had made a complete mess of things, and Rockefeller hired Frederick T. Gates to sort out his investments and charitable activities. Nearly all the mining investments which Colby and Hoyt had made were worthless, but Gates discovered one that was not: The Minnesota Iron Company, which owned mineral lands on the Mesabi Range.

Wetmore now approached Gates and told him about the ore discoveries the Merritts had made. Gates visited the Mesabi in the spring of 1893, and was extremely impressed with the extremely inexpensive cost of mining ore on the Mesabi. Iron had only been discovered on the Mesabi in 1890, and by 1893 a massive "ore boom" was underway there. Rockefeller perceived that, just as had happened in petroleum refining, overproduction was occurring and suicidal competition was likely to cause most mining companies to collapse. Rockefeller had secured a monopoly on oil refining by controlling transportation, and he saw the Merritts' railroad and lakeshore property in Duluth as the potential key to building an iron ore monopoly.

Rockefeller agreed to purchase $400,000 (equivalent to $12,802,000 in 2025) in bonds to fund the railroad extension.

=== Impact of the Panic of 1893 ===
The Panic of 1893 began in February of that year, and by summer the stocks and bonds owned by the Merritts were worthless. Desperate, three times in February the Merritts asked Rockefeller for investments or loans that would keep their mining empire afloat. Rockefeller refused.

Rockefeller's inept financial advisor Charles Colby came up with a potential solution: On March 16, 1893, he told Gates that Rockefeller could take control of the Merritt mines and the Merritt railroad by creating a new company, Lake Superior Consolidated Mines. Rockefeller would throw in his own mining interests. The Merritts, Gates, and Rockefeller discussed the plan for four months. Having already invested $400,000, Rockefeller decided to go all in: In a series of contracts signed in July and August, the new company was formed. (Note: The key contract was signed on July 12, and the last in the series of contract signed on August 28.) Rockefeller turned over to the new firm all his stock in the Aurora Iron Mining Co., Penokee & Gogebic Consolidated Mines, Spanish-American Iron Co., West Superior Iron & Steel Co., and two Mesabi mines he had already purchased from the Merritts. In exchange, Rockefeller received first mortgage bonds worth $4,299,000 (equivalent to $137,589,000 in 2025). (Note: A "first mortgage bond" is a bond which gives bondholders first claim to plant, property, and equipment if the bond issuer defaults.) A total of 2,605,000 shares of Lake Superior Consolidated Mines stock was issued, at a par value of $10 a share. Rockefeller received 521,000 shares, and the Merritts received 1 million shares. Other investors in the mining companies and railroad received the remainder of the shares.

As part of the agreement, Rockefeller agreed to buy at market rates all the iron the Merritts could ship. He advanced the company $500,000 (equivalent to $16,002,000 in 2025) immediately, and another $1.5 million (equivalent to $49,863,000 in 2025) in 1894. Because the Merritts were in such personal financial straits, he personally loaned them $150,000 (equivalent to $4,801,000 in 2025) to keep them on their feet.

The railroad was completed to Duluth.

=== Transfer of stock to Rockefeller ===
The Merritts had hoped to sell their Lake Superior Consolidated stock to liquidate their debt, but in the dire economic circumstances of the depression could not do so. On September 30, 1893, the Merritts asked Rockefeller for a loan of $100,000, but he declined. (Note: Rockefeller had already loaned $6 million in cash to other rich friends to keep them out of bankruptcy, and borrowed $3 to $4 million more against his own stocks and bonds to keep his various businesses afloat.)

During the winter of 1893–1894, the wooden ore dock the Merritts erected at Duluth was destroyed by storms. They needed to rebuild it, but had no money to do so. In January 1894, the Merritts offered to sell Rockefeller 90,000 Lake Superior Consolidated shares at a par value of $900,000 (even though the shares were, due to the depression, worthless). Rockefeller agreed, purchasing the shares in two separate blocks on February 1 and February 21. He gave the Merritts the option of repurchasing their shares within a year, at 6 percent interest (or $10.60 a share). None of them did so, and almost none of them asked for an extension. (Note: Only Lewis Merritt and his son, Hulett Merritt, asked for extensions. Rockefeller gave it to them, year after year. When Lake Superior Consolidated Mines was purchased by U.S. Steel in 1902, Lewis and Hulett Merritt redeemed their stock using an advance from U.S. Steel, and made millions.) When the Merritts ran out of money again, Rockefeller agreed to turn over $2.15 million of his company bonds in exchange for stock at par value (or 215,000 shares).

Rockefeller now held 826,521 Lake Superior Consolidated shares, the Merritts only 695,000 shares, and myriad other investors 1,084,000 shares. Since no other investor came close to holding as many shares as Rockefeller did, he now controlled Lake Superior Consolidated Mines. (Note: Rockefeller also bought some shares from other investors on the open market, so he likely held more than 826,521 shares and the other investors likely held less than 1,084,000.)

=== Merritt lawsuit ===
With the Lake Superior Consolidated stock still nearly worthless, Alf Merritt filed suit against Rockefeller on October 30, 1894. Merritt claimed that the mining assets Rockefeller had turned over to Lake Superior Consolidated Mines were worthless, and this had caused the stock to sink.

According to historian Ron Chernow, Rockefeller likely had inflated the value of some of his mines, but not all of them. According to Rockefeller biographer Allan Nevins, all of the mining properties the Merritts had contributed were worthless, primarily because the Merritts had invested so little in them, shipped so little ore, and had so much debt. Nevins, a champion of Rockefeller, says Alf Merritt was angry at losing control of Lake Superior Consolidated Mines, and believed the stock price would never recover in time for him to avoid bankruptcy. He sued merely to recover whatever funds he could from Rockefeller.

The trial opened on June 5, 1895. On June 13, a federal jury held in favor of Alf Merritt and awarded him $940,000 (equivalent to $31,573,000 in 2025) in damages. Rockefeller appealed, and on November 9, 1896, the U.S. court of appeals unanimously overturned the jury verdict.

Rockefeller then entered into negotiations with Alf Merritt, fearing that additional meritless lawsuits from other family members might tie up Lake Superior Consolidated Mines at just the time that Rockefeller intended to move forward with his monopoly plans. The two parties settled out of court, with Rockefeller agreeing to pay the Merritts $525,000 (equivalent to $17,452,000 in 2025).

== Aftermath ==
Having lost their mining empire, the Merritts continued to explore for minerals of various kinds in the western United States, western Canada, and Mexico, but never struck any deposits of substantial value.

== Bibliography ==
- Chernow, Ron (2004). Titan: The Life of John D. Rockefeller, Sr. New York: Vintage Books. ISBN 9781400077304.
- Middleton, William D.; Smerk, George M.; Diehl, Roberta L., eds. (2007). Encyclopedia of North American Railroads. Bloomington: Indiana University Press. ISBN 9780253349163.
- Nevins, Allan (1940). John D. Rockefeller: The Heroic Age of American Enterprise. Vol. 2. New York: Charles Scribner's Sons. OCLC 1181390168.
- Van Brunt, Walter (1921). Duluth and St. Louis County, Minnesota: Their Story and People. Chicago: American Historical Society. OCLC 7368864.

== For further reading ==
- Lamppa, Marvin G. (1 January 2004). Minnesota's Iron Country: Rich Ore, Rich Lives. Lake Superior Port Cities. ISBN 978-0-942235-56-2.
- King, Frank Alexander (1972). The Missabe Road: The Duluth, Missabe and Iron Range Railway. U of Minnesota Press. ISBN 978-0-8166-4083-6.
- King, Frank Alexander (2003). Minnesota Logging Railroads. U of Minnesota Press. ISBN 978-0-8166-4084-3.
- Morris, Charles R. (3 October 2006). The Tycoons: How Andrew Carnegie, John D. Rockefeller, Jay Gould, and J. P. Morgan Invented the American Supereconomy. Henry Holt and Company. ISBN 978-1-4299-3502-9.
- Polta, Harold J. (1971). Mesabi Range iron ore transportation: feasibility and estimated cost of pipelining. U.S. Dept. of the Interior, Bureau of Mines.
- Stanley, Augustus Owsley; MacRae, Farquhar J. (1911). United States Steel Corporation: Hearings Before the Committee on Investigation of United States Steel Corporation. House of Representatives. [In Eight Volumes]. U.S. Government Printing Office.
- Walker, David A. (March 2004). Iron Frontier: The Discovery and Early Development of Minnesota's Three Ranges. Minnesota Historical Society Press. ISBN 978-0-87351-491-0.
