= Fortress Transportation and Infrastructure Investors =

American company

Fortress Transportation and Infrastructure Investors is a corporation.

== History ==
On 31 May 2019, construction of the Long Ridge Energy gas-fired power plant began in Monroe County, Ohio. At the time, the Long Ridge project was 100% owned by FTAI. General Electric supplied the 485MW gas turbine power plant.

On 20 November 2019, it was announced that Canadian Pacific would purchase the Central Maine and Quebec Railway from FTAI.

On 23 December 2019, GCM Grosvenor acquired a 49.9% equity stake in the Long Ridge Energy Terminal from FTAI.

== Leadership ==
The company was formed by Wes Edens.
