= Great Lakes Transportation =

The G.L.T. logo

Great Lakes Transportation (GLT) was a group of transportation-related companies primarily consisting of rail and water carriers catering to the needs of the steel making industry centered on the Great Lakes of North America. The holding company was acquired by Canadian National Railway in 2004.

== History ==
Its companies included:

- Bessemer and Lake Erie Railroad
- Duluth, Missabe and Iron Range Railway
- Great Lakes Fleet
- Pittsburgh & Conneaut Dock Company

Formerly owned by the privately owned Transtar, Inc., GLT's rail and marine holdings were purchased in 2004 by the Canadian National Railway for $380 million USD.

Great Lakes Fleet operated eight Great Lakes bulk carriers ranging from 1,004 feet long to 767 feet long. Among its carriers was the SS Arthur M. Anderson, notable for being the last ship to have radio contact with her sister ship the SS Edmund Fitzgerald and would be the lead ship to attempt to rescue her crew.
