= Bessemer and Lake Erie Railroad =

Railroad in the United States

Overview
- Headquarters: Homewood, Illinois
- Reporting mark: BLE
- Locale: Ohio and Pennsylvania
- Dates of operation: 1869–2004
- Successor: Canadian National Railway

Technical
- Track gauge: 4 ft 8 1/2 in (1,435 mm) standard gauge

Other
- Website: www.cn.ca

The Bessemer and Lake Erie Railroad (reporting mark BLE) was a class II railroad that operated in northwestern Pennsylvania and northeastern Ohio.

The railroad's main route runs from the Lake Erie port of Conneaut, Ohio, to the Pittsburgh suburb of Penn Hills, Pennsylvania, a distance of 139 miles (224 km). The original rail ancestor of the B&LE, the Shenango and Allegheny Railroad, began operation in October 1869.

Rail operations were maintained continuously by various corporate descendants on the growing system that ultimately became the BLE in 1900. In 2004 BLE came under the ownership of the Canadian National Railway (CN) as part of CN's larger purchase of holding company Great Lakes Transportation. BLE is operated by CN as their Bessemer Subdivision. As a subsidiary of CN, BLE has been largely unchanged (though repainting of BLE locomotives into CN paint with "BLE" sub-lettering began in April 2015) and still does business as BLE. BLE locomotives, especially the former Southern Pacific SD40T-3 "Tunnel Motors", have been scattered across the CN system; many are being used in the line that feeds most of BLE's traffic, the former Duluth, Missabe, and Iron Range lines in Minnesota. The iron ore that originates on these lines is transloaded to ships at Two Harbors, Minnesota, then sent by ship to Conneaut, Ohio, where it is again transloaded to BLE trains. It is then taken down to steel mills in the Pittsburgh region, mainly to the blast furnaces at US Steel's Edgar Thomson Plant in Braddock, Pennsylvania, part of the Mon Valley Works.

== History ==
Revenue freight traffic, in millions of net ton-miles
Year	Traffic
1925	2045
1933	807
1944	2675
1960	1318
1970	2462

1916 valuation map by the Interstate Commerce Commission

The Pittsburgh, Bessemer and Lake Erie Railroad Company was founded in 1897 by Andrew Carnegie to haul iron ore and other products from the port at Conneaut, Ohio, on the Great Lakes to Carnegie Steel Company plants in Pittsburgh and the surrounding region. On the return trip, Pennsylvania coal was hauled north to Conneaut Harbor. The company was created largely out of a series of small predecessor companies including the Pittsburgh, Shenango and Lake Erie Railroad, and the Butler and Pittsburgh Railroad Company. The company was renamed the Bessemer and Lake Erie Railroad in 1900. Carnegie Steel had an exclusive 99-year lease to the PS&LE. This lease was acquired by US Steel when that company acquired Carnegie Steel in 1901.

At the end of 1925 B&LE operated 228 miles of road on 631 miles of track; at the end of 1970 mileages were 220 and 489.

In 1988 the Bessemer & Lake Erie Railroad became part of Transtar, Inc., a privately held transportation holding company with principal operations in railroad freight transportation, dock operations, Great Lakes shipping, and inland river barging that were formerly subsidiaries of USX, the holding company that owns U.S. Steel. In 2001 the Bessemer & Lake Erie Railroad became part of Great Lakes Transportation, LLC. On May 10, 2004 Canadian National Railway acquired the Bessemer and Lake Erie Railroad. Iron ore and coal are still the route's major freight commodities.

== Route notes ==
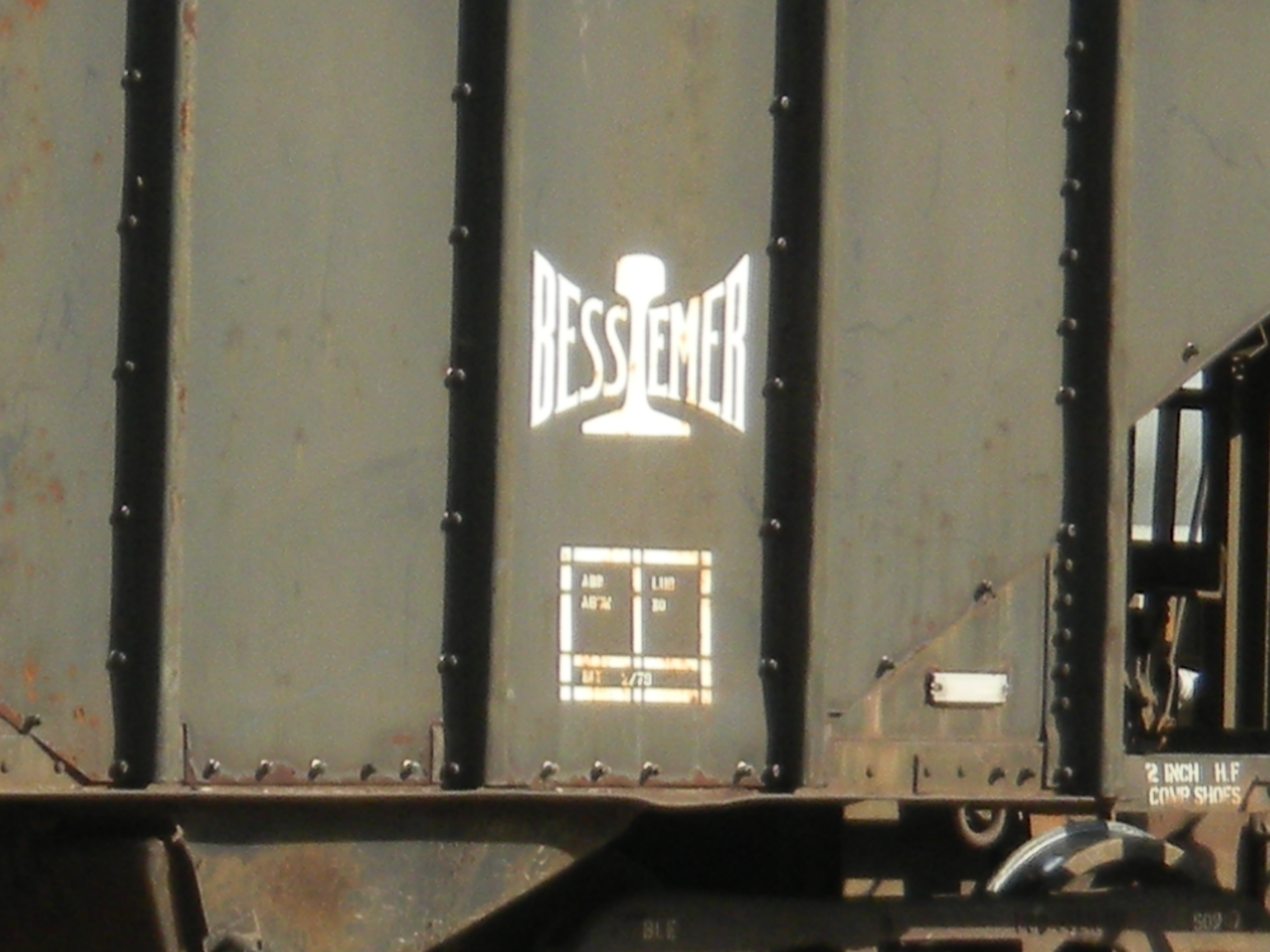
B&LE logo on a hopper at Cedar Rapids, Iowa

The B&LE connects with the Norfolk Southern Railway at Wallace Junction, near Girard, Pennsylvania, and at the Shenango Yard in Greenville, Pennsylvania. The Union Railroad connects at the B&LE's southern terminus at Penn Hills' North Bessemer Yard. CSX (formerly the Erie-Lackawanna Railroad) connects at Shenango Yard (the Pennsylvania Railroad may have connected here, too), and the Buffalo and Pittsburgh Railroad connects at Calvin Yard in Butler, Pennsylvania. The B&LE formerly interchanged at Osgood, Pennsylvania with the New York Central System, later Penn Central Railroad and then Conrail, until the latter abandoned the line in 1988.

The Bessemer and Lake Erie accessed the City of Erie using trackage rights over the Nickel Plate Road established in 1891 by the PS&LE. There the railroad maintained a small terminal facility for both passenger and freight operations, with its own passenger station a block north of Union Station.

The main rail yard and locomotive and car shops are in Greenville, Pennsylvania. Although the B&LE acquired some early diesel-electric switching locomotives painted black with yellow trim, in 1950 the company adopted a locomotive color scheme of bright orange and black which is still in use. Because the B&LE's primary traffic is iron ore, it adopted rust-colored hoppers so the ore wouldn't produce noticeable stains on its cars.

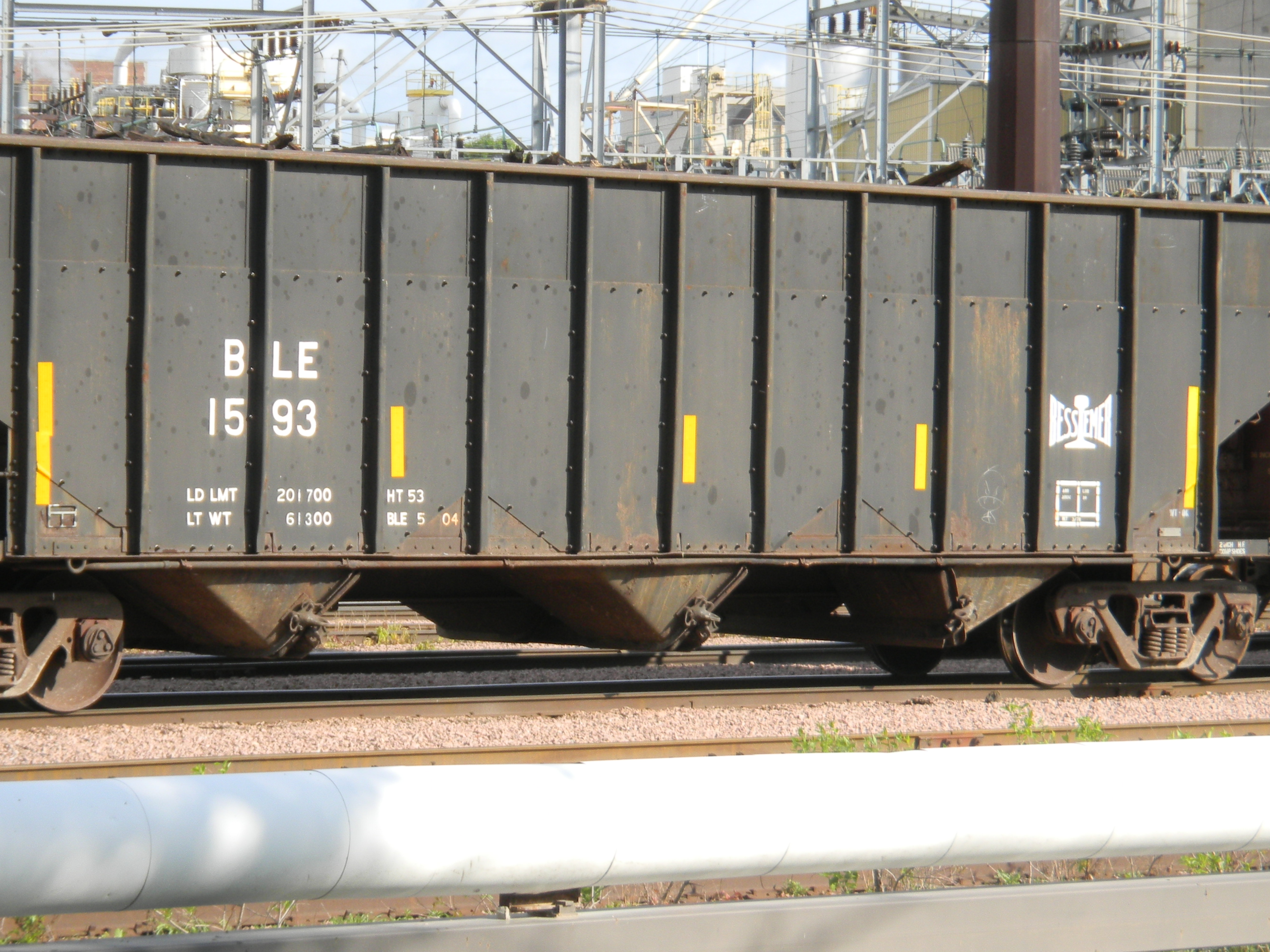
B&LE 1593

The B&LE also saw passenger traffic, and maintained a spur line from its main line east to Conneaut Lake Park amusement park for dropping off and picking up excursionists visiting the park.

The B&LE main line divides around Greenville, between a waypoint north of the village of Osgood called 'KO' and another waypoint near the village of Kremis that used the telegraph call name 'KY', for the "Osgood-Kremis" cut-off ("K-O") that joined the original "Old Line" there. The latter still winds down along the Little Shenango and Shenango Rivers into downtown Greenville (where the B&LE shops are located), and then climbs back up to Kremis, en route to Fredonia and North Bessemer. The B&LE constructed the shortcut K-O Line in 1901–02 to bypass the steep, winding route through Greenville. From 'KO Junction', it runs south over a long (1,724 feet (525 m)) viaduct above the Little Shenango River, the original B&LE Old Line, the former NYC RR's JF&C Branch and the former Erie RR's Chicago—New York main line at Osgood. It then passes east of downtown Greenville at a relatively high elevation, and rejoins the original line at KY, near Kremis. The K-O Line cut-off shortened KO to KY run by 3.1 miles vs. the Old Line. Except for the Osgood Viaduct, this cut-off was double-tracked for many years but, since the arrival of CTC signaling in the 1950s, is now entirely single track.

The B&LE operated a line from Queen Junction (near Butler, Pennsylvania) to Brady's Bend, Pennsylvania. It was known as the Western Allegheny Division, and was notable for being the last line that the B&LE's F-Units ran on. F-unit service on the line ended in 1992, and the last train, which was pulled by an EMD SD9 ran in November 1994. The line sat out of service until 2000, when it was abandoned. The tracks were removed in 2002, and today, the right of way is barely visible.

There was originally one tunnel on the B&LE mainline at Culmerville, but it was dug out or "daylighted" in 1922, converting it to an open cut through a hill.

Bessemer Logo

As it approaches North Bessemer, the B&LE is also noticeable where it crosses the Allegheny River on the 2,327 feet (709 m) Bessemer & Lake Erie Railroad Bridge immediately east of and parallel to the Pennsylvania Turnpike.

== Locomotives ==
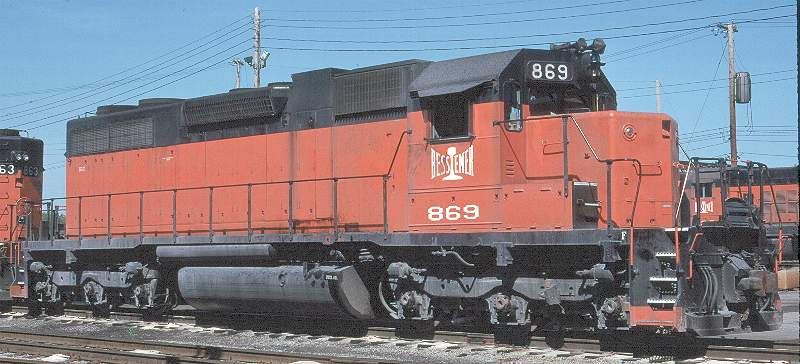
Bessemer & Lake Erie SD38AC #869.

In the steam era, B&LE had a fleet of 2-8-0 "Consolidation" types, classes C1 through C4; 2-10-2 "Santa Fe" types, classes D1 and D2; and 2-10-4 "Texas" type locomotives, class H1. The H1 locomotives were one of the most powerful non-articulated locomotives ever constructed. The B&LE also had a number of switchers, including 0-6-0s and 0-8-0s. Two steam locomotives from the B&LE have been preserved, which are 2-10-4 No. 643 and 2-8-0 No. 154. The road was dieselized in 1953. In the diesel era, B&LE's motive power has always been mostly Electro-Motive Division. It dieselized with many EMD F-units, which were supplemented by SD9s, SD18s, and ALCo RSD15s. Later, it bought a number of EMD SD38ACs and SD38-2s to replace the F-units. In the late 1990s, it bought many EMD SD40T-3 "Tunnel Motors" from Southern Pacific Railroad to replace the 1950s-vintage SD9s.

As a subsidiary of CN, the B&LE has been largely unchanged (though repainting of B&LE locomotives into CN paint with "BLE" sub-lettering began in April 2015). Bessemer and Lake Erie's locomotives, especially the SD40T-3 "Tunnel Motors," have been scattered across the CN system in the mid-late 2000s with the majority leaving the B&LE Property in March 2015. Many of these SD40T-3s are being used on the line that feeds most of B&LE's traffic, the former Duluth, Missabe, and Iron Range Railroad in Minnesota. The iron ore that originates on these lines is transloaded to ships at Two Harbors, Minnesota; then sent by ship to Conneaut, Ohio, where it is again transloaded to B&LE trains. It is then taken down to steel mills in the Pittsburgh area, mainly to the blast furnaces at US Steel's Edgar Thomson Plant in Braddock, Pennsylvania, part of the Mon Valley Works. As of October 2022, the locomotives on the Bessemer include a set of 3 or 4 CN EMD SD70M-2s (CN 8800, 8804, 8827, 8876, and 8907 are currently on the property) for ore trains. B&LE Tunnel Motor 905, B&LE SD38AC 868, and B&LE SD38 862 (painted in the Duluth, Missabe, and Iron Range Railroad scheme) are kept on the line for use on locals, and rare appearances on the ore trains. 868 previously operated at the docks in Conneaut until the loop track was put back in place around 2020.

Preceded by Providence and Worcester Railroad	Regional Railroad of the Year; 2000	Succeeded by Wisconsin and Southern Railroad
