= Edwin H. Gott =

American business executive (c.1908–1986)

9th President of U.S. Steel
- In office 1967–1969
- Preceded by: Leslie B. Worthington
- Succeeded by: Edgar B. Speer

Personal details
- Born: c. 1908 Pittsburgh, Pennsylvania, US
- Died: August 27, 1986 (aged 78) Pittsburgh, Pennsylvania, US
- Education: Lehigh University

Edwin H. Gott (c. 1908 – August 27, 1986) was an American business executive who served as president of U.S. Steel from 1967 to 1969.

== Biography ==
Born c. 1908, in Pittsburgh, Gott graduated from Lehigh University with a Bachelor of Science in 1922. He married Mary Louise Carr, having three children together. He worked for Koppers by 1936, and in 1937, he was hired by U.S. Steel as an industrial engineer for a steel mill in Youngstown, Ohio, then was moved to Clairton Coke Works in 1939, then the Gary Works in 1941. He received multiple promotions at Gary, later receiving an administrative position at South Works. In 1956, he was elected vice president of the company's manufacturing, then vice president of its administration in 1959.

Gott was elected president in 1967, and within two months, headed three other executive groups in the company. He became CEO & Chairman of U.S. Steel on February 1, 1969, following the retirement of Roger Blough, serving until his retirement in February 1973. Through his later life, he retained several other administrative positions, such as being a board member of BNY, the Pittsburgh Civic Light Opera and UPMC Children's Hospital of Pittsburgh, as well as being a trustee of Lehigh and Carnegie Mellon University. He died on August 27, 1986, aged 78, in Pittsburgh, following an illness. The MV Edwin H. Gott—built 1979—is named for him.
