= Great Lakes Fleet =

American shipping company

Great Lakes Fleet (GLF)
- House flag
- Type: Subsidiary
- Industry: Transportation
- Founded: July 1, 1967; 59 years ago
- Headquarters: Duluth, Minnesota, United States
- Area served: Great Lakes (North America)
- Parent: Canadian National Railway Company
- Website: www.cn.ca/en/our-services/supply-chain-services/marine/

Great Lakes Fleet, Inc., is a shipping firm headquartered in Duluth, Minnesota. It operates a fleet of nine self-unloading bulk carriers on the Great Lakes, which transport dry bulk cargo such as iron ore, coal and limestone, the company was originally Pittsburgh Steamship Company.

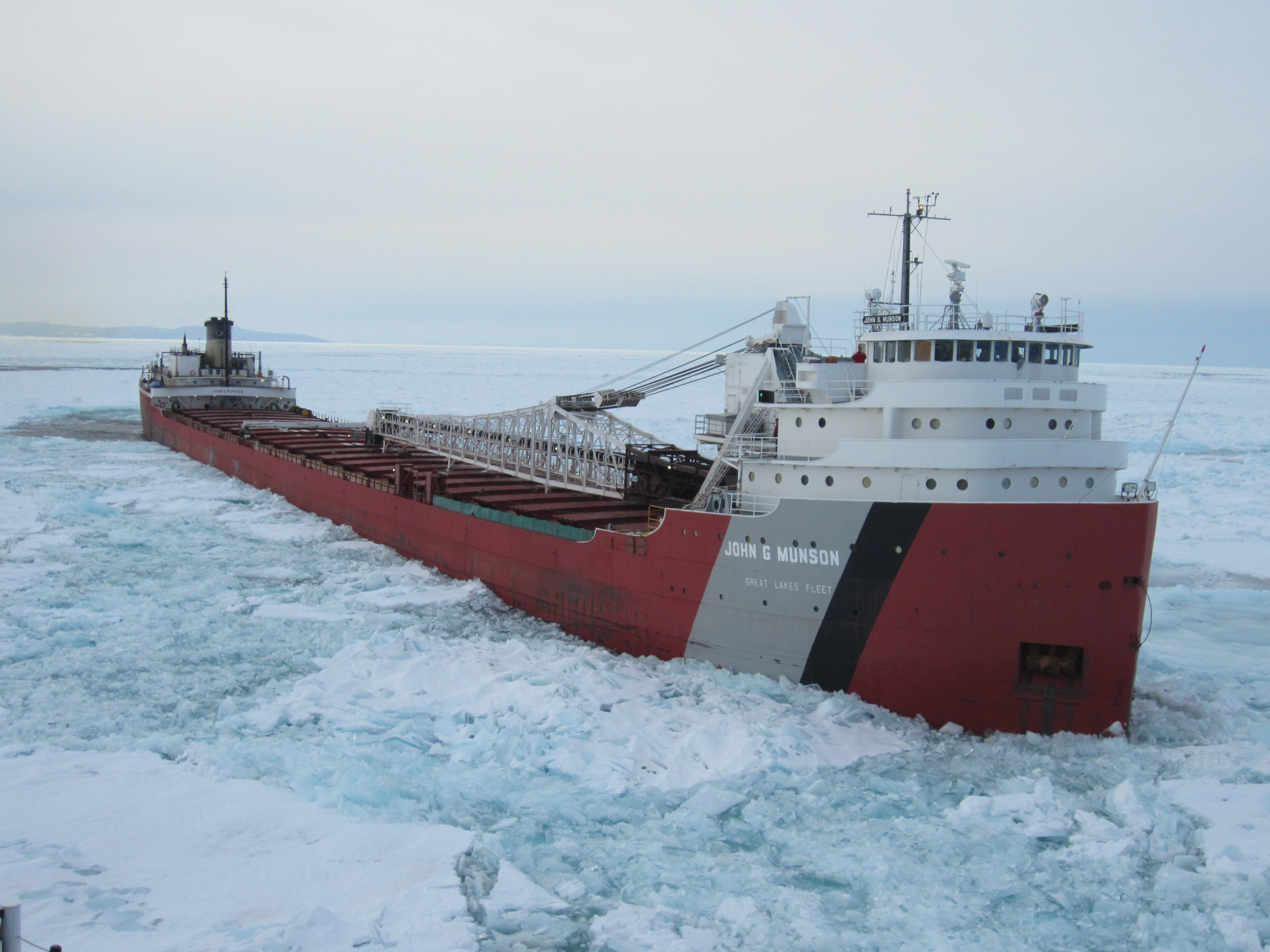
One of the Great Lakes Fleet ships. The MV John G. Munson underway.

== History ==
Great Lakes Fleet was formed on July 1, 1967, when U.S. Steel consolidated its Great Lakes shipping operations by merging the Pittsburgh Steamship Division and its sister fleet, the Bradley Transportation Company forming the USS Great Lakes Fleet.

In 1981, Great Lakes Fleet was spun off into a U.S. Steel–owned subsidiary, Transtar, Inc.

== Vessels ==
- SS Arthur M. Anderson – Last ship to have contact with the SS Edmund Fitzgerald
- SS Cason J. Callaway
- SS Phillip R. Clarke – First vessel of the 'AAA' Class ore carriers; the SS Arthur M. Anderson and the SS Cason J. Callaway are also of this class. The three are sometimes referred to as the "Triplets" because the three ships are nearly identical in dimensions and appearance.
- MV John G. Munson
- MV Roger Blough – First "super carrier" upon the lakes, with its keel laid in 1968, predating the larger 1,000-foot (300 m) vessels.
- MV Edwin H. Gott – Formerly the most powerful vessel on the Great Lakes, with Enterprise DMRV-16-4 diesel engines and twin propellers, rated at 19,500 bhp (14,500 kW) as built; repowered in 2011
- Edgar B. Speer
- MV Presque Isle
- MV Great Republic

== Former vessels ==
- MV Calcite II
- MV Myron C. Taylor
- MV George A. Sloan – Sold to Lower Lakes Towing Limited, which renamed her MV Mississagi for the start of the 2001 season; scrapped in 2021
- SS Irvin L. Clymer
