= David S. Sutherland =

American businessman

- Born: 1948 or 1949 (age 76–77)
- Education: University of Saskatchewan (BCom); University of Pittsburgh (MBA)
- Occupation: Businessman
- Title: Chairman, U.S. Steel
- Term: January 2014-
- Predecessor: John P. Surma
- Board member of: U.S. Steel (since 2008); GATX; Imperial Oil

David S. Sutherland (born 1948/1949) is an American businessman, and the non-executive chairman of U.S. Steel, since January 2014, when he succeeded John P. Surma.

Sutherland received a Bachelor of Commerce from the University of Saskatchewan in Canada and a Master of Business Administration from the University of Pittsburgh.

Sutherland worked for 30 years for IPSCO Steel, the last five as president and CEO. In 2008, Sutherland became a main board director of U.S. Steel. In January 2014, he succeeded John P. Surma as chairman of U.S. Steel.

He also served as chairman of the American Iron and Steel Institute and held board memberships at the Steel Manufacturers Association, the International Iron and Steel Institute, the Canadian Steel Producers Association, and the National Association of Manufacturers.

Sutherland is also a director at GATX and Imperial Oil.
