= John Fabel =

American inventor and designer (born 1962)

John Fabel (born 1962) is an American inventor, entrepreneur, industrial designer, and educator living in Amherst, Massachusetts.

== Early life and education ==
Fabel is the son of the author and theologian Arthur Fabel, and the brother of anthropologist and global health program developer Elizabeth Fabel. He is also the cousin of author Gregory Maguire, and the son-in-law of physician and mountaineer Hans Kraus.

Fabel attended the University of Massachusetts at Amherst. He also studied at the University of East Anglia, through the Climatic Research Unit (CRU).

Fabel's undergraduate thesis investigated a method for using dendro-climatological methods to evaluate the impact of acid rain on forest tree growth. Fabel's thesis advisors were climate scientists Dr. Keith Briffa and Dr. Phil Jones, who were targeted in the CRU email controversy. Fabel's graduate thesis examined the interscale relationships between spatial patterns of natural and social systems, and implications for design and decision making.

== Career ==
Much of the focus of Fabel's work has been on developing technologies, innovation strategies, and entrepreneurial mechanisms to address climate change and related issues of sustainable development.

Fabel has founded several companies, NGOs, and initiatives, including EcoTrek (which uses recycled polymer materials to create products), Qteros, a cellulosic biofuels company, and Community Vision, which worked with rural US communities on land-use planning and design.

Fabel holds or is named on a number of patents ranging from structural engineering to microbial genomics. Fabel's work is held in the collection of several museums, including the Smithsonian. From 2001 to 2011 Fabel and his work were included in the "Invention at Play" exhibit at the National Museum of American History.

Fabel is used as an example of a creative thinker in Daniel H. Pink's book “A Whole New Mind” and in the booklet for the “Invention” Merit Badge of the Boy Scouts of America.

Fabel has contributed to the design and development of many products, from airships to backpacks. He has twice been the recipient of Backpacker Magazine's “Editor's Choice” award.

Fabel has founded the bicycle and materials development company Sylvan Cycles, which makes bicycles and other products from high-performance bio-composite materials, using low-carbon footprint manufacturing processes. Fabel has consulted on a number of ventures and initiatives.

As an educator, Fabel has held positions and taught at Hampshire College, The University of Massachusetts Amherst, Marlboro College, and Amherst College. At the last of these, he taught innovation and entrepreneurial skills to both students and faculty. He is currently an Adjunct Assistant Professor in the School of Environmental Conservation at the University of Massachusetts Amherst.

== Personal ==
Fabel is married to architect Mary Kraus; they have one daughter. Fabel lives at Pioneer Valley Cohousing Community in Amherst, Massachusetts, of which he is a founding member.
