= MV Roger Blough =

Great Lakes freight ship

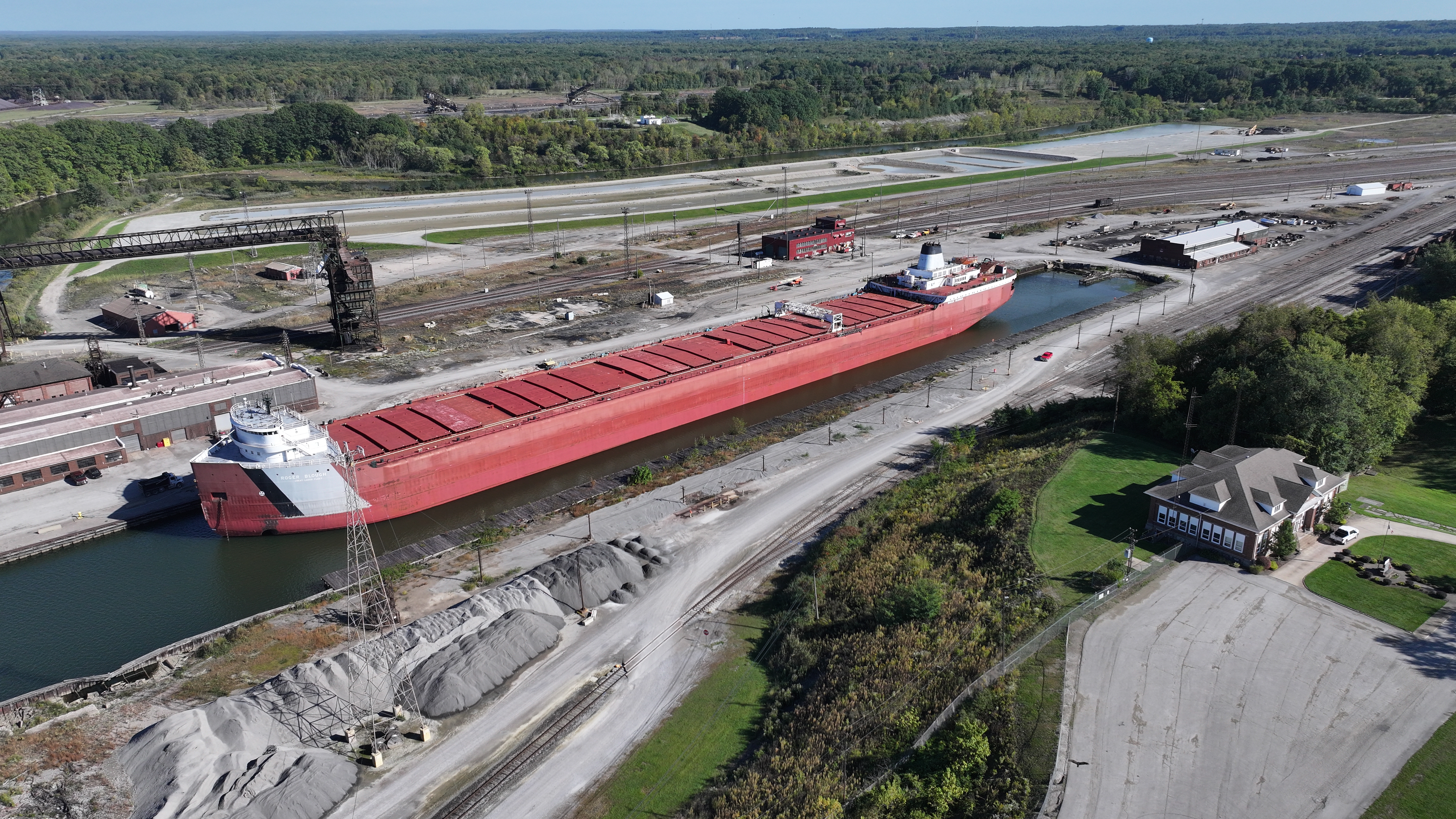

History

United States
- Name: Roger Blough
- Owner: Great Lakes Fleet
- Operator: Great Lakes Fleet
- Builder: American Ship Building Company
- Yard number: 900
- Laid down: September 3, 1968
- Launched: June 5, 1972
- In service: June 15, 1972
- Identification: Call sign:WDH7559; IMO number: 7222138
- Notes: Shuttle boom type self-unloading dry bulk carrier

General characteristics
- Class & type: Lake freighter
- Tonnage: 22,041 GRT; 14,114 NRT
- Length: 858 ft (262 m)
- Beam: 105 ft (32 m)
- Depth: 39.2 ft (11.9 m)
- Propulsion: 2 x SEMT Pielstick, 16PC2V-400 four stroke, single acting V-16, 7,100 bhp (5,300 kW) each

MV Roger Blough is a lake freighter built in 1972 by American Ship Building Company in Lorain, Ohio. She serves as a lake freighter on the Great Lakes. The ship is owned by Great Lakes Fleet, Inc. and is named for the former chairman of U.S. Steel, Roger Blough.

== Service history ==
The ship's launch was originally planned for July 1971. However, on June 24, 1971, the ship suffered a major engine room fire which killed four and caused serious damage. Sea trials and delivery were delayed by a year to June 1972.

The Roger Blough assisted in the search for SS Edmund Fitzgerald. On November 11, 1975, the morning after the sinking, the crew of Roger Blough recovered a 25-person life raft from Edmund Fitzgerald.

She was stuck in the ice in Lake Erie near Conneaut, Ohio, for eight days in February 1979 and then was laid up from 1981 to 1987 due to the economy and the capacity of the newer 1,000 feet (300 m) lake freighters.

On May 27, 2016, while under operation of the Keystone Shipping Company, Roger Blough ran aground on Gros Cap Reef in Whitefish Bay, Lake Superior, with some minor flooding reported. She remained aground on May 29, 2016, near Gros Cap Reefs Light with the United States Coast Guard vessel USCGC Mobile Bay on station monitoring the situation and enforcing a 500-yard (460 m) safety zone around the vessel. At 5:45 AM on June 3, Roger Blough began offloading some of its taconite cargo to SS Philip R. Clarke to lift the ship off the reef. The vessel was refloated off the reef at 10:45 AM, June 4, and anchored at Waiska Bay for further evaluation or repairs. Lightering operations were completed at Waiska Bay on June 7, 2016, with Philip R. Clarke and SS Arthur M. Anderson receiving the remainder of the taconite cargo. Starting off on June 11, 2016, Roger Blough was escorted by the tug Candace Elise to Bay Shipbuilding, Sturgeon Bay, Wisconsin, for repairs.

=== Fire in layup ===
On February 1, 2021, the vessel was again engulfed in flame from an engine fire while docked at Bay Shipbuilding. No casualties were reported as the ship was empty and in winter layup when the fire started.

According to the National Transportation Safety Board's August 17, 2022, incident report

the probable cause of the engine room fire aboard the bulk carrier Roger Blough was likely the repeated removal and reinstallation of the furnace’s burner that led to the failure of its mounting coupling, resulting in the operating burner dropping to the bottom of its enclosure and fracturing its fuel supply line, which allowed diesel fuel to ignite. Contributing to the casualty was the absence of a fire-activated automatic fuel oil shutoff valve on the fuel oil inlet piping before the burner, which would have stopped the fuel feeding the fire shortly after it started and limited the spread of the fire.

The ship’s future is very unclear (as of November 2021), however there are possible indications, including visible repair efforts to the vessel’s aft section, that the ship is salvageable and the funds needed for repair work ($20 million) are available, barring additional complications. The NTSB report puts the amount of damage at more than $100 million.

On October 27, 2022, Roger Blough departed Bay Shipbuilding in Sturgeon Bay under tow, destined for Conneaut, Ohio, for long term layup. As of August 18, 2024, the ship was docked in Conneaut, Ohio. The ship remains laid up as of July 2026.
