= Walter F. Munford =

American business executive (c.1900–1959)

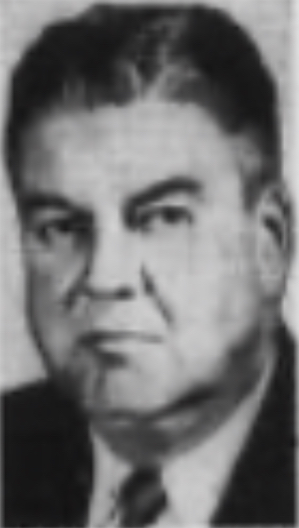
- Munford in a 1959 publication of The Washington Star

7th President of U.S. Steel
- In office May 5, 1958 – September 28, 1959
- Preceded by: Clifford Hood
- Succeeded by: Leslie B. Worthington

Personal details
- Born: c. 1900 Worcester, Massachusetts, US
- Died: September 28, 1959 (aged 59) Cape Cod Hospital, Hyannis, Massachusetts, US
- Relations: Robert Munford (son)
- Education: Worcester Polytechnic Institute; Massachusetts Institute of Technology
- Occupation: Business executive

Walter F. Munford (sometimes misspelled Mumford; c. 1900 – September 28, 1959) was an American business executive who served as president of U.S. Steel.

== Biography ==
Munford was born c. 1900, in Worcester, Massachusetts. He attended Worcester Polytechnic Institute and the Massachusetts Institute of Technology, and in 1923, graduated from the latter. In 1919, he was hired as a reamer worker at the American Steel and Wire Company—a job he held during college—and became president of the company on January 1, 1953. He married a woman named Camille, and they had two children: Walter Jr. and Robert, who became an artist as an adult.

In 1956, he got an executive job at U.S. Steel, and was appointed president by chairman Roger Blough on May 5, 1958, serving until his death. As president, he ended a 79-day strike with lenient negotiations. He spent his final months being treated by a doctor for fatigue and exhaustion. On September 24, 1959, he accidentally stabbed himself with a fillet knife in the kitchen of his summer home in Chatham, Massachusetts, and was admitted to Cape Cod Hospital, underwent surgery and left in stable condition. He returned to the hospital on September 28, suffering from unrelated cerebral venous sinus thrombosis, a type of stroke. He died there, aged 59, and was buried in Chatham Union Cemetery.
