= Charles E. Wyman =

American bioenergy expert

- Born: United States
- Education: Princeton University; University of Denver; University of Massachusetts
- Known for: Bioenergy, Biomass
- Scientific career
- Fields: Bioenergy, Biofuels
- Workplaces: Mascoma Corporation(co-founder); Dartmouth College; UC Riverside

Notes
- He is a Distinguished Professor Ford Motor Company, Chair Distinguished Professor of Chemical & Environmental Engineering at UC Riverside

Charles E. Wyman, is a Ford Motor Company chair and a distinguished professor and endowed chair in chemical and environmental engineering at University of California, Riverside. Wyman was also the Paul E. and Joan H. Queneau Distinguished Professor in Environmental Engineering Design at the Thayer School of Engineering at Dartmouth College, Prior to joining UC Riverside. He is the co-founder and former chief development officer and chair of the scientific advisory board of Mascoma Corporation. He is one of the researchers responsible for the development of the bioenergy, biomass and biofuel. He is an authoritative figure in the broad area of ethanol. He has made significant seminal contributions in the specific areas of pretreatment, enzymatic hydrolysis, and dehydration of cellulosic biomass to reactive intermediates for biological or catalytic conversion into fuels and chemicals. Wyman has over 200 journal papers, 25 books chapters (with several second and third editions), and has given numerous (over 300) national and international talks, 30 technical reports and about more than 20 patents.

== Education ==
Charles got his bachelor's degree in chemical engineering from University of Massachusetts, US, in 1967. Wyman graduated with both master's and PhD in lllChemical lllEngineering from Princeton University in 1971. Focusing towards start up he even later did his MBA from University of Denver in 1988.

== Career ==
Prior to joining UC Riverside as a professor in 2005, Wyman was a faculty member of Dartmouth College. He has addressed several important problems in cellulosic biomass to ethanol and other products with particular focus on Coordinated development of leading biomass pretreatment technologies. Being a fellow he has handled several projects of the American Association for Advancement of Science (AAAS). He has been coordinator to train National Renewable Energy Laboratory (NREL) since 17 years as role and leadership focused or on vast area of Biomass. He is also cofounder and a team member of Vertimass LLC, a sustainable transportation fuels that reduce greenhouse gas emissions and improve energy security and domestic economies.

Wyman has developed several biological models. He has introduced direct iterative based how biotech can transform biofuels problems, which is still a challenging task in the research community. He has put forth his knowledge and ideas in many highly rated journals. He has had the distinction of getting his paper listed in the most cited paper since 23 years, which is one of the many accomplishments that has made him a leading researcher in the field of Bioenergy. Wyman has been an eminent fellow of the American Association for Advancement of Science since 2006, and has received several awards, namely the C.D. Scott Award in Biotechnology 1999), NREL Hubbard Leadership Award (1992), and the NREL Staff Leadership Award (1991). He has been listed among the top most cited papers in the Journal of Bioresource Technology.

== Awards ==
- Fellow, American Association for Advancement of Science, 2006
- C.D. Scott Award in Biotechnology, 1999
- Honorary Master of Arts, Dartmouth College, 2004
- NREL Hubbard Leadership Award, 1992
- NREL Staff Leadership Award, 1991
