= Leslie B. Worthington =

American business executive (1902–1998)

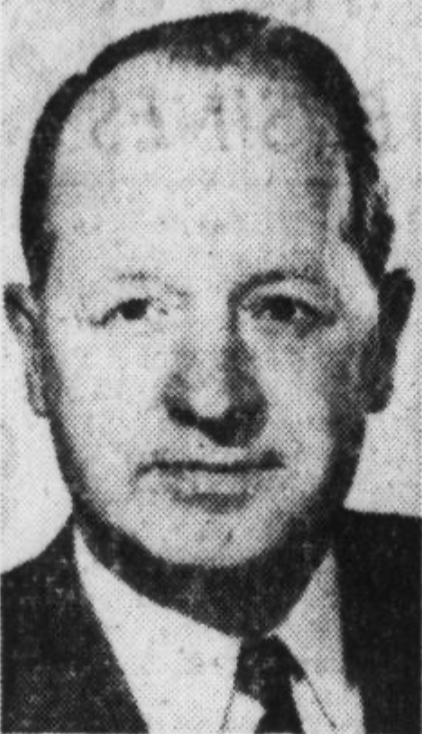
- Worthington in a 1959 publication of The Washington Star

8th President of U.S. Steel
- In office 1959–1967
- Preceded by: Clifford Hood
- Succeeded by: Edwin H. Gott

Personal details
- Born: 1902 England, UK
- Died: August 3, 1998 (aged 96) Ligonier, Pennsylvania, US
- Education: University of Illinois System

Leslie B. Worthington (1902 – August 3, 1998) was an English-born American business executive who served as president of U.S. Steel from 1959 to 1967.

== Biography ==
Born 1902, in England, Worthington and his mother immigrated to the United States in 1907 to join his coal miner father. He graduated from the University of Illinois System and worked as a salesman for the Carnegie-Illinois Steel Corporation. He joined the United States Steel Supply Corporation in 1942, serving as its president from 1946 to 1952. In 1957, he became president of Columbia-Geneva Steel, a U.S. Steel division in San Francisco.

Worthington was elected president of U.S. Steel on November 10, 1959, following the death of his predecessor Walter F. Munford. In January 1960, with intervention from James P. Mitchell and Richard Nixon, he increased employee salaries to negotiate a six-month strike. He also raised salaries in April 1962 alongside an increase of steel from $6 to $176 per ton to counter John F. Kennedy's criticisms of the steel industry. Due to this, Kennedy ordered a Sherman Antitrust investigation by the United States Department of the Treasury. The Treasury discovered steel was sold to Luxembourg for cheaper than American companies. The investigation led to prices being lowered. U.S. Steel was indicted in other antitrust lawsuits throughout in 1962, and in 1963, the companies' prices were allowedly raised to an average of $4.85 per ton. Later price raises under the Presidency of Lyndon B. Johnson were unchallenged. In 1966, Worthington created the USS Chemicals subsidiary.

Worthington married twice: first to Dorothy Helen Rice, who died in 1968, and second to Bernice Hubbard. He had two children. He retired in 1967, and died on August 3, 1998, aged 96, in Ligonier, Pennsylvania.

== Awards ==
- Horatio Alger Award –1966
