= Mascoma =

Mascoma may refer to:

Locations in the United States

- The Mascoma River in New Hampshire
- Mascoma Lake in New Hampshire

Derived from the river or lake

- Mascoma Corporation, a biofuel company
- Mascoma Valley Regional High School, Canaan, New Hampshire, United States
- USS Mascoma (AO-83), a U.S. Navy vessel in World War II
