= Extra Mile Education Foundation =

US non-profit organization

- Formation: 1989
- Type: 501(c)(3)
- Purpose: Inner city education
- Headquarters: Pittsburgh, PA
- Parent organization: Catholic Church
- Website: www.extramilefdn.org

The Extra Mile Education Foundation is a privately funded, non-profit charity 501(c)(3) based in Pittsburgh, Pennsylvania, founded in 1989. The money raised by the charity is used to subsidize the tuition of low income students who attend several K–8 Catholic schools in the Pittsburgh area. Most of the students are African American. As of January 2011, five Pittsburgh schools are currently enrolled in the program.

== Statistics ==
A January 28, 2007 article in the Pittsburgh Post-Gazette cites the following information about The Extra Mile Education Foundation

- Of the 830 students whose education is funded by the program, most are non-Catholic.
- 70% of the students come from families whose income is low enough to qualify for free or reduced priced lunches.
- Of the students who graduate from the program (i.e., from 8th grade), not a single student has ever failed 9th grade, and 96% of the students graduate from high school within 4 years.
- The foundation spends $1.9 million per year for scholarships. The money comes from donations, and from interest on the foundation's $17 million endowment.

== Mission statement ==
The following is an excerpt from their official mission statement: "Extra Mile Education Foundation supports the education of urban children in select Pittsburgh parochial elementary schools ... The schools – identified by the Diocese of Pittsburgh – are in economically disadvantaged neighborhoods, and students are primarily African American and non-Catholic. Extra Mile is dedicated to sustaining these schools for their communities on an ongoing basis..." The entire mission statement can be read on the Foundation website.

== Donors ==
Donors include:

- Heinz Endowments
- Westinghouse Electric

== Board of directors ==
Notable members of the foundation's board include:

- Art Rooney II, President of the Pittsburgh Steelers
- Michael P. Tomlin, Head coach Pittsburgh Steelers
- David Shapira, Chairman and CEO of Giant Eagle
- Thomas Usher, former Chairman of Marathon Oil
- David Zubik, Bishop of Pittsburgh
