= James C. Donnell =

American industrialist (1854–1927)

- Born: April 20, 1854
- Died: January 10, 1927 (aged 72)
- Occupation: Industrialist
- Years active: 1872-1927
- Employer: The Ohio Oil Company
- Spouse(s): Sara Elizabeth Flynn, Lizzie Weston Meeks
- Children: Elizabeth and Otto D. Donnell
- Parent(s): James Donnell and Elizabeth Doyle

James C. Donnell (April 20, 1854 – January 10, 1927) was an American industrialist. He was the president of The Ohio Oil Company from 1911 until his death in 1927.

== Early life and career ==
James C. Donnell was born on April 20, 1854, in County Armagh, Ireland, to James Donnell and Elizabeth Doyle. At the age of two, Donnell and his family moved to the United States and settled in Waterford, Pennsylvania. At the age of eighteen, he began his career in the oil industry by hauling crude oil from a refinery in Titusville, Pennsylvania. When the Bradford Oil Field opened in 1874, Donnell went into business for himself, gaining leases at Red Rock and Dallas City, Pennsylvania. He went on to gain further leases in Allentown and Bolivar, New York.

He then headed to Ohio to begin work at the Lima Oil Field, and became associated with the Standard Oil Company. In 1889, when the Standard Oil Company gained control of The Ohio Oil Company, Donnell was named a director of the company and manager of its field operations. In 1900 he was elected vice-president and general manager, moving his offices to Findlay, Ohio the following year. In 1906, he accompanied then president of Standard Oil, John D. Archbold to Romania to assist in the reorganization of The Romano-American Oil Company. Two years later, they again set about reorganizing another facet of Standard Oil, with the reorganization of Standard Oil of California in 1908.

== The Ohio Oil Company ==
In 1911, the United States Supreme Court dismantled Standard Oil on antitrust violations, and The Ohio Oil Company again became an independent company. Donnell succeeded Archbold as its president. He retained the position until his death in 1927. Under his direction, Ohio Oil expanded operations into sixteen states and Mexico. In 1915, he organized the Illinois Pipeline Company to operate pipeline transportation for Ohio Oil. In 1924, Donnell gained control of the Lincoln Oil Refining Company in Robinson, Illinois, giving Ohio Oil its own refining capacity.

When he died in 1927, the assets of The Ohio Oil Company totalled $108 million, with $17 million net income. 5 million acres (20,000 km^{2}) of oil or natural gas producing lands were owned or operated under lease by the company. According to Time Magazine, before he died in 1927, Donnell was known as the last living man to call John D. Rockefeller simply "John". Others called Rockefeller "Senior."

== Legacy ==
The James C. Donnell Memorial, Donnell Stadium, in Findlay, Ohio was donated in 1928 by his son, Otto D. Donnell, and named in his father's honor.
