= John P. Surma =

American businessman (born 1954)

- Born: John Peter Surma; 1954 (age 71–72); Pittsburgh, Pennsylvania, U.S.
- Education: Penn State University
- Occupations: Retired Chairman and CEO of U.S. Steel
- Spouse: Becky Surma

John Peter Surma (born May 25, 1954) is an American businessman. He was the executive chairman of the board of United States Steel Corporation. Surma retired as CEO of U.S. Steel effective September 1, 2013, and Chairman effective January 1, 2014, positions he had held since 2004.

== Biography ==
John Surma earned a bachelor’s degree in accounting from Pennsylvania State University in 1976. He joined Price Waterhouse and became a partner in 1987. In 1983, he was picked for Ronald Reagan’s Executive Exchange Program in Washington, D.C., where he worked with the Federal Reserve Board. He was appointed by President Barack Obama to serve as the vice chairman of the President's Advisory Committee for Trade Policy and Negotiations.

In 1997, he joined Marathon Oil, a subsidiary of U.S. Steel, as senior vice president of finance and accounting. In 1998, he became president of Speedway SuperAmerica, a subsidiary of Marathon, and in 2001 he became president of Marathon Ashland Petroleum, another subsidiary. When U. S. Steel and Marathon separated at the end of 2001, he stayed with U. S. Steel as vice chairman and chief financial officer. He became president of U. S. Steel in March 2003, and chairman of the board as of February 2006.

Surma is chairman of the International Iron and Steel Institute, vice chairman of the American Iron and Steel Institute, and a board member of the National Association of Manufacturers.

As vice chairman of the Penn State Board of Trustees, Surma was involved in the decision to remove football coach Joe Paterno following the Penn State child sex abuse scandal. The decision was communicated to Paterno via a phone call.

Surma became chairman of the Penn State Board of Trustees three days later when Chairman Steve Garban resigned his position. In January 2012 he relinquished the position to The Bank of New York Mellon executive Karen Peetz, but he has continued to sit on the board. Surma was a director of BNY Mellon until April 2012. In 2011 his reported compensation as a director of BNY Mellon was $216,575.

In 2006, Surma was awarded the Elbert Gary Medal by the American Iron and Steel Institute.

Surma retired as chief executive officer of United States Steel on August 31, 2013. He continued as executive chairman until December 31, 2013, when he retired from the company and the board.

In September 2015, Surma assumed the chairmanship of the National Safety Council, succeeding Jeff Woodbury. Surma had been on the board since 2011. He retired from that position in 2017, being succeeded by Mark Vergnano.

=== Compensation ===
While CEO of United States Steel in 2008, Surma received total compensation of $11,130,689, which included a base salary of $1,218,336, a cash bonus of $3,250,000, stocks granted of $4,174,028, options granted of $2,233,336, and other compensation of $254,989.

In 2009, Surma’s total compensation as U.S. Steel CEO fell over 83% to $1.5 million from $11.1 million the previous year. He voluntarily declined long-term incentive awards and took a 20% salary cut due to economic challenges. Despite this, he received a $210,000 bonus for safety and environmental performance. That year, U.S. Steel reported a $1.4 billion net loss amid declining industry demand.

=== Pittsburgh Penguins ===
As of 2012, Surma held a minority ownership stake in the NHL’s Pittsburgh Penguins.

== See also ==
- List of chief executive officers
- Executive officer
