= Robert Munford =

American artist (1925–1991)

Robert Watson Munford
- Born: June 22, 1925; Worcester, Massachusetts
- Died: May 28, 1991 (aged 65); Water Mill, New York
- Known for: Painting; Printmaking; Illustration; Art Education

Robert Watson Munford (June 22, 1925 – May 28, 1991) was an American artist, educator, and founding member of the artist group Grupo Ibiza 59 in Spain. His artwork is in the permanent collections of the Hirshhorn Museum and Sculpture Garden (Washington, DC), the Museum of Modern Art (New York), and the Städtische Galerie Wolfsburg (Germany). He was a pop art pioneer.

== Biography ==
=== Early life and career ===
Munford was born in Worcester, Massachusetts, on June 22, 1925, to Camille and Walter F. Munford.

He attended Worcester Academy (Worcester, Massachusetts) and later joined the U.S. Army Air Corps during the Second World War. Munford decided to pursue a career in art and following the war, he studied in a number of places including Ohio State University (1946–1947), the Cleveland Institute of Art (1947–1949), the University of Bellas Artes, San Miguel de Allende, Mexico (1947), and the Art Students League of New York (1949–1951). Around 1951, he relocated to Provincetown, Massachusetts. While there, Munford exhibited at the Sun Gallery and the Babcock Gallery in New York City. He also worked as a freelance illustrator for Fortune Magazine, Esquire, and Harper's Magazine.

=== Europe ===
In 1956, Munford moved to the Balearic Islands in Spain, first to the island of Formentera and subsequently to the island of Ibiza. From 1957 to 1966, he resided in the Ibizan town of Santa Eulària. At that time, Ibiza was home to a colony of artists, writers, and expatriates predominantly from Europe and North America.

While on Ibiza, Munford helped found Grupo Ibiza 59, an artist group that included Erwin Bechtold, Erwin Broner, Hans Laabs, Katja Meirowsky, Egon Neubauer, Antonio Ruiz, Bertil Sjöberg, and Heinz Trökes. The Spanish sculptor Carlos Sansegundo and African-American painter Bob Thompson later joined the group.

Prior to 1957, Munford had painted in an abstract expressionist style. His work, La Vigie, featured in Munford's 1960 Paris show at the Galerie Lara Vincy, is an example of this period of production. Between the years 1957 and 1964, Munford, in a series of gouache and oil paintings, moved towards a distinctive proto-pop style, his work of this period now being characterized by the use of cloudy atmospheres, silhouetted figures, and pop art elements, such as handwriting, numbers, diagrams, repetitive stamped images, and photographic transfers. Examples of this style can be seen in Hocus Pocus (1961), And Then There Were None (1964) and Pedigree (1963).

Munford's work was exhibited throughout Europe in such venues as Galerie Lara Vincy (Paris), Salon des Réalités Nouvelles (Paris), Galerie Brusberg (Hannover, Germany), Galerie Springer (Berlin), Leicester Galleries (London), Galeria Ivan Spence (Ibiza), and Galerie Handschin (Basel). In the 1963 Paris edition of the New York Herald Tribune, then art critic John Ashbery reviewed Munford's Galerie Lara Vincy show, citing Munford as an early pop art practitioner. In his book New Tendencies in Art (1966), the critic Aldo Pellegrini classified Munford as part of a group of "neo-figurative artists" whose work blended pop art imagery. Pellegrini listed Larry Rivers, R.B. Kitaj, Peter Saul, and Harold Stevenson among Munford's stylistic contemporaries.

From 1962 to 1965, Munford was involved with the Druckwerkstatt art school at the Schloss Wolfsburg (Wolfsburg, Germany). While at the Druckwerkstatt, Munford lectured on lithography and created a series of lithographs in his distinct proto-pop style. The Museum of Modern Art (New York) owns a lithograph from the Druckwerkstatt series.

=== New York ===
In 1966, Munford returned to the United States to work in New York City. Between 1968 and 1970, Munford designed stage sets for the Michael Abrams Gothic Art Theater, the Brooklyn Academy of Music, the Elliot Feld American Ballet Company, and the New York City Center. In 1970, he was commissioned by Great American Editions to create a series of silkscreen prints depicting circus scenes. From 1970 to 1971, these images were exhibited in several locations, including Carlow College (Pittsburgh, Pennsylvania), the Westmoreland Museum (Greensburg, Pennsylvania), the Sunrise Museum (Charleston, West Virginia), the National Art Museum of Sport, Madison Square Garden (New York), and the Parrish Art Museum (Southampton, New York).

In 1971, Munford joined the art faculty of the Long Island University, Southampton Campus, where he taught art for the next twenty years. Munford died on May 28, 1991, in Water Mill, Long Island, New York.
