= Thomas Usher =

American businessman (born 1942)

Thomas James Usher (born September 11, 1942) is an American business executive who has served as the president, chief operations officer and chief executive officer of U.S. Steel. He has also served as chairman of the board of directors of Marathon Oil, the International Iron and Steel Institute, and the US-Korea Business Council, as well as at U.S. Steel.

== Career ==
Usher was born in Reading, Pennsylvania and graduated from the University of Pittsburgh with a Bachelor of Science degree in industrial engineering in 1965, a Master of Science degree in operations research in 1966, and a doctorate in systems engineering in 1971. He joined United States Steel Corporation in 1965 and held various positions in industrial engineering spending much of his early career in the field. From 1975 through 1979 he held a number of management positions, including assistant to the general superintendent, at U. S. Steel's South Works in Chicago and Gary Works in Gary, Indiana.

Usher moved back to Pittsburgh in 1979 as director of corporate strategic planning. Two years later, he became assistant to the president and managing director of facility planning, engineering, and research. Usher became president of USS mining in 1983, senior vice president of steel operations in 1984, executive vice president of heavy products in 1986.

Early in his career, Usher spent ten years teaching courses part-time at the University of Pittsburgh's Joseph M. Katz Graduate School of Business as well as undergraduate and graduate classes in industrial engineering at the university's Swanson School of Engineering.

In 1990, Usher was elected president of U.S. Steel Group and director of USX, which had changed its name from U.S. Steel in 1986, and president and chief operating officer of USX in 1994. He became chairman of the board and chief executive officer effective in 1995, which provided him oversight of USX's oil and energy businesses.

Usher has been credited with turning around and leading U.S. Steel through a difficult period in the steel industry. His success in leading U.S. Steel during this period has in part been credited to his initiation of significant changes, including the separation of Marathon Oil and U.S. Steel at the end of 2001, a move designed to allow both companies to focus on their core businesses. His success has also been credited to his expansion of U.S. Steel by leading it to purchase operations in Slovakia and Serbia, which took the previously domestic U.S. Steel international, as well as consolidating the industry through acquisitions and integrations, such as that of National Steel Corporation. By the end of his tenure as CEO, U.S. Steel had more than doubled in size. Usher's tenure at U.S. Steel was also noted for his positive relations with the labor unions. He also led the charge to impose the 2002 United States steel tariff in order to protect domestic U.S. steel production, including testifying before the U.S. government's U.S.-China Economics and Security Review Commission.

Usher retired from U.S. Steel, which had changed its name back from USX, as chief executive officer in September 2004 and as non-executive chairman of the board on February 1, 2006.

Usher served or serves on the boards of directors of Transtar, Inc., H. J. Heinz Company, PNC Financial Services, and PPG Industries, as well as U.S. Steel and Marathon Oil where he served as chair. He has served as chairman of the board of the American Iron and Steel Institute, the International Iron and Steel Institute, and the US-Korea Business Council. He has also been a board member of the American Petroleum Institute, is a member of the board of trustees of the University of Pittsburgh, and has sat or sits on the board of directors of the US-Japan Business Council, the Extra Mile Education Foundation and the Boy Scouts of America.

== Awards ==
Usher was awarded the University of Pittsburgh's School of Engineering's Distinguished Alumni Award in 1986 and was named one of the 100 "Pittsburghers of the Century" in 1999 by Pittsburgh Magazine. He was named a University of Pittsburgh Distinguished Alumni Fellow in 1999 and a Legacy Laureate in 2000. In 2002, he received the Steelmaker of the Year Award from the Iron & Steel Society, and in 2003, he accepted the United States Secretary of State’s Award for Excellence for U.S. Steel from Colin Powell. In 2004, he won the Vectors Pittsburgh Man of the Year. Usher was the commencement speaker and was awarded an honorary Doctor of Humane Letters degree by Saint Vincent College. He was also the honoree at the 2007 Southpointe CEO Association World Class Executive Series.

== Personal life ==
Usher has philanthropically supported the University of Pittsburgh's Swanson School of Engineering's Industrial Engineering Learning Center and, among other programs, has created the endowed position of U.S. Steel Dean of Engineering at the university, and have established the Sandra and Thomas Usher Endowed Chair in Melanoma at the University of Pittsburgh Cancer Institute. He is married to Sandra Usher, a fellow Pitt alumnus, and has three children.
