= Mascoma Corporation =

American biofuel company

Mascoma Corporation - Mascoma LLC
- Company type: Private company
- Industry: Biofuels, cellulosic ethanol
- Founded: 2005
- Headquarters: Lebanon, New Hampshire
- Key people: Founders : Robert Johnsen, Lee Lynd and Charles Wyman
- Number of employees: ~40
- Website: www.mascoma.com

Mascoma Corporation was a U.S. biofuel company founded to produce cellulosic ethanol made from wood and switchgrass. Headquartered in Lebanon, New Hampshire, the company was founded in 2005 by Robert Johnson (CEO), Lee Lynd and Charles Wyman, two professors from Dartmouth College. The company was named after Mascoma Lake, which is near Lebanon. In November 2014, the yeast-related business assets including the Mascoma name were purchased by Lallemand, Inc. of Montreal, Canada. The R&D facility in Lebanon, NH was renamed Mascoma LLC which is now a subsidiary of Lallemand. The remaining business assets of the former Mascoma Corp. including the thermophilic bacteria technology, pilot plant in Rome, NY, and former headquarters in Waltham, MA were renamed Enchi Corporation.

== Start-up ==
The company was first financed by Flagship Ventures and Khosla Ventures in 2006. Also in 2006, the company raised attracted additional attention with two private financing rounds led by General Catalyst Partners that raised $34 million and through its acquisition of Celsys BioFuels Inc. of Indianapolis. Also in 2007, it received a US$14.8 million grant from two government agencies—the New York State Department of Agriculture and Markets and the New York State Energy Research and Development Authority—for the creation of a plant in Rochester, New York, that would demonstrate the biomass-to-ethanol process.

== Partnerships ==
In September 2007, Mascoma announced plans to partner with the University of Tennessee to build the first U.S. plant for the commercial production of switchgrass-based ethanol. In June 2008, however, the projected plant failed to meet its anticipated funding levels, and Mascoma withdrew from the partnership. Instead, it took on the role as technical adviser.

In May 2008, the company entered a partnership with General Motors to develop cellulosic ethanol based on Mascoma's formula that enables the biochemical conversion of nongrain biomass into low-carbon biofuel. In the same month, Mascoma received a $10 million investment from the Houston-based oil and gas company Marathon Oil.

In October 2008, the U.S. Department of Energy gave the company a $26 million grant to develop a cellulosic fuel production facility. In the same month, the state government of Michigan gave the company a $23.5 million grant to bring that proposed facility to Chippewa County, Michigan.

== Facilities ==
On April 14, 2009, Mascoma Corp. announced plans to move its corporate headquarters from Boston to a new research laboratory in New Hampshire. The move would consolidate most of Mascoma's operations, which, until now, have been divided among Boston; a demonstration facility in Rome, New York; a Process and Development laboratory in Woburn, Massachusetts; and a lab in Lebanon, New Hampshire, where many of the company's employees already are based. Researchers in Lebanon are working to convert plant material such as wood chips and corn stover into biofuel.

== Technological breakthrough ==
On May 7, 2009, the company announced a major technological breakthrough in the field of consolidated bioprocessing by utilizing a low-cost strategy for processing of biofuels from cellulosic biomass, which enables high yield of ethanol and cellulase in single step without the costly, separate usage of the cellulase enzyme.

Other biofuel companies (such as Gate Fuels Qteros) also claim to have developed a one-step process to produce ethanol or value-added chemicals from plant material.

== Technology Commercialization and Partnership with Lallemand ==
On January 11, 2012, the company announced that it was launching Mascoma Grain Technology, or MGT, the first commercial application of the company's proprietary technology platform. The MGT product is a genetically-modified yeast which produces enzymes and improves ethanol production in the corn-based fuel ethanol production process. At that time the company announced that it had entered into a multi-year exclusive partnership with Lallemand Specialties, Inc. to manufacture and distribute the MGT product in North America. On September 24, 2013, Mascoma Corporation announced that its MGT yeast products TransFerm and TransFerm Yield+ had been used to produce over 2 billion gallons of renewable fuel. At that time, the company announced its updated commercial strategy, focusing on deployment of its microorganisms to a broad spectrum of biofuel and biochemical applications.

== Acquisition by Lallemand ==
On November 4, 2014, Mascoma Corporation announced that it had completed the sale of its yeast business to Lallemand, Inc. As part of the transaction, Lallemand acquired the Mascoma name and trademarks, all of its proprietary and patented yeast strains and associated technologies, as well as its entire research and development team located at its facility in Lebanon, NH.

== New Yeast for Cellulosic Ethanol ==
On June 3, 2015, Mascoma LLC and the U.S. U.S. Department of Energy's BioEnergy Science Center announced development of a new strain of yeast developed by Mascoma and BESC for cellulosic ethanol production. The product, named C5 FUEL, is a yeast capable of converting xylose into ethanol. Xylose is a sugar found in cellulosic biomass that can not be fermented by conventional ethanol-fermenting yeast.
