= Edgar B. Speer =

Self-discharging bulk carrier

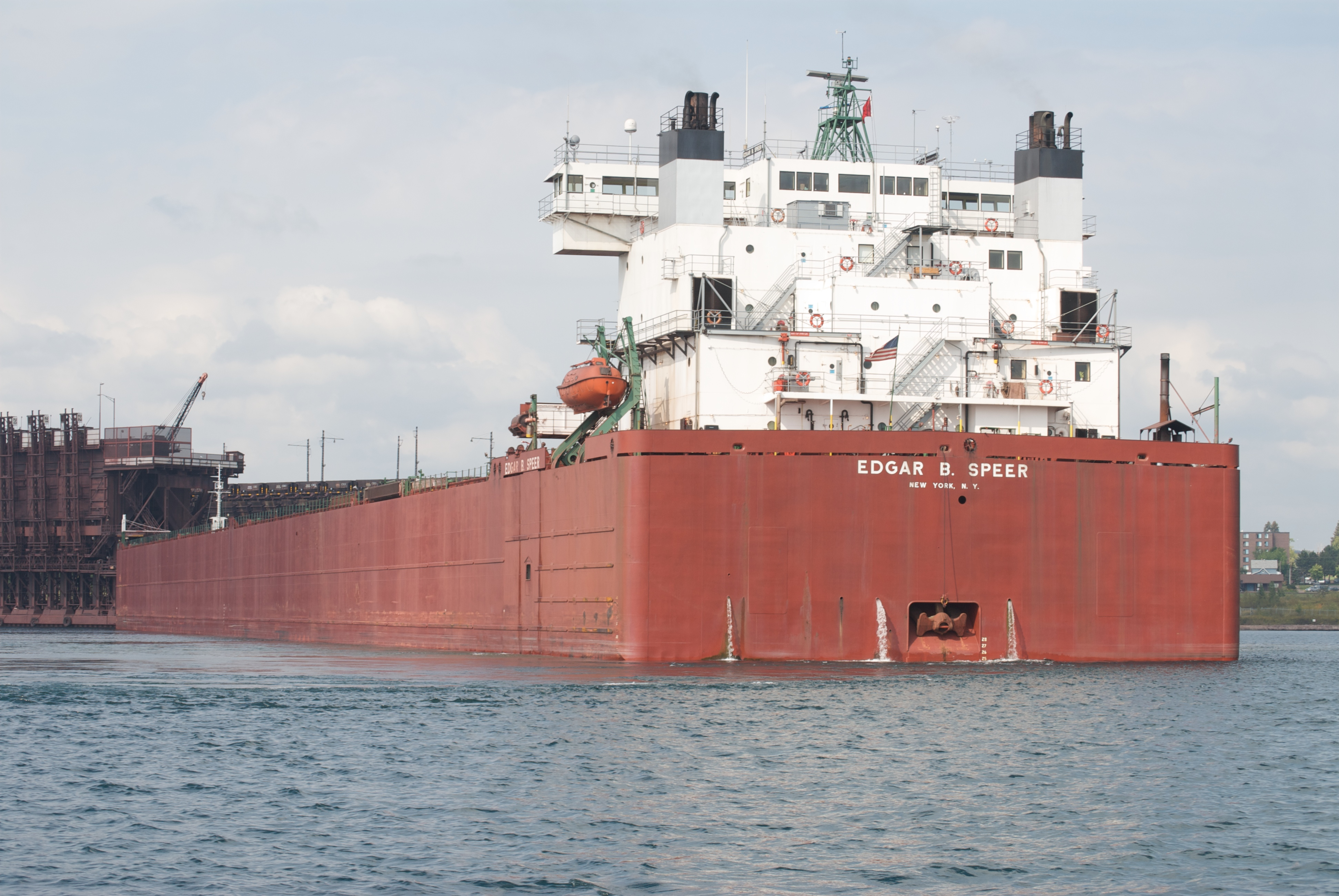
- Edgar B. Speer

History

United States
- Name: Edgar B. Speer
- Namesake: Edgar B. Speer
- Owner: Great Lakes Fleet
- Operator: Great Lakes Fleet
- Builder: American Shipbuilding Company
- Yard number: 908
- Launched: 1980
- Identification: Call sign: WDH7562; IMO number: 7625952
- Status: In service as of 2025

General characteristics
- Class & type: Lake freighter
- Tonnage: 34,620 GRT; 28,553 NT
- Length: 1,004 feet (306 m) oa; 990 feet (302 m)
- Beam: 105 ft (32 m)
- Draft: 32 ft (9.8 m) (Max loaded draft); 56.7 ft (17.3 m) (hull depth)
- Propulsion: two Pielstick 18PC2-3V-400 diesel engines, twin propellers, rated at 19,260 bhp (14,360 kW)
- Speed: 15 knots (28 km/h; 17 mph)

Edgar B. Speer is a very large diesel-powered lake freighter owned and operated by Great Lakes Fleet, Inc, a subsidiary of Canadian National Railway. This vessel was built in 1980 in two halves by American Ship Building Company, in Lorain and Toledo, Ohio, with the two halves being joined in Lorain.

The ship is 1,004 feet (306 m) long and 105 feet (32 m) at the beam. It has a carrying capacity of 2,105,527 cubic feet (59,621.9 m^{3}), has a 52-foot (16 m) unloading shuttle boom and is capable of unloading 10,00 NT/hr. The maximum load that the Edgar B. Speer, is cable of carrying is about 74,100 tons. The ship has 20 hatches which are 28 by 11 feet (8.5 by 3.4 m), which open into 5 cargo holds.

Unlike her sister ship Edwin H. Gott, Edgar B. Speer has retained her shuttle boom.This unique unloading system restricts her to transporting iron ore to Conneaut, Ohio and Gary, Indiana. As of 2025 the only other vessel in service with a shuttle boom configuration is the Stewart J. Cort.
