= MV Edwin H. Gott =

Self-discharging bulk carrier

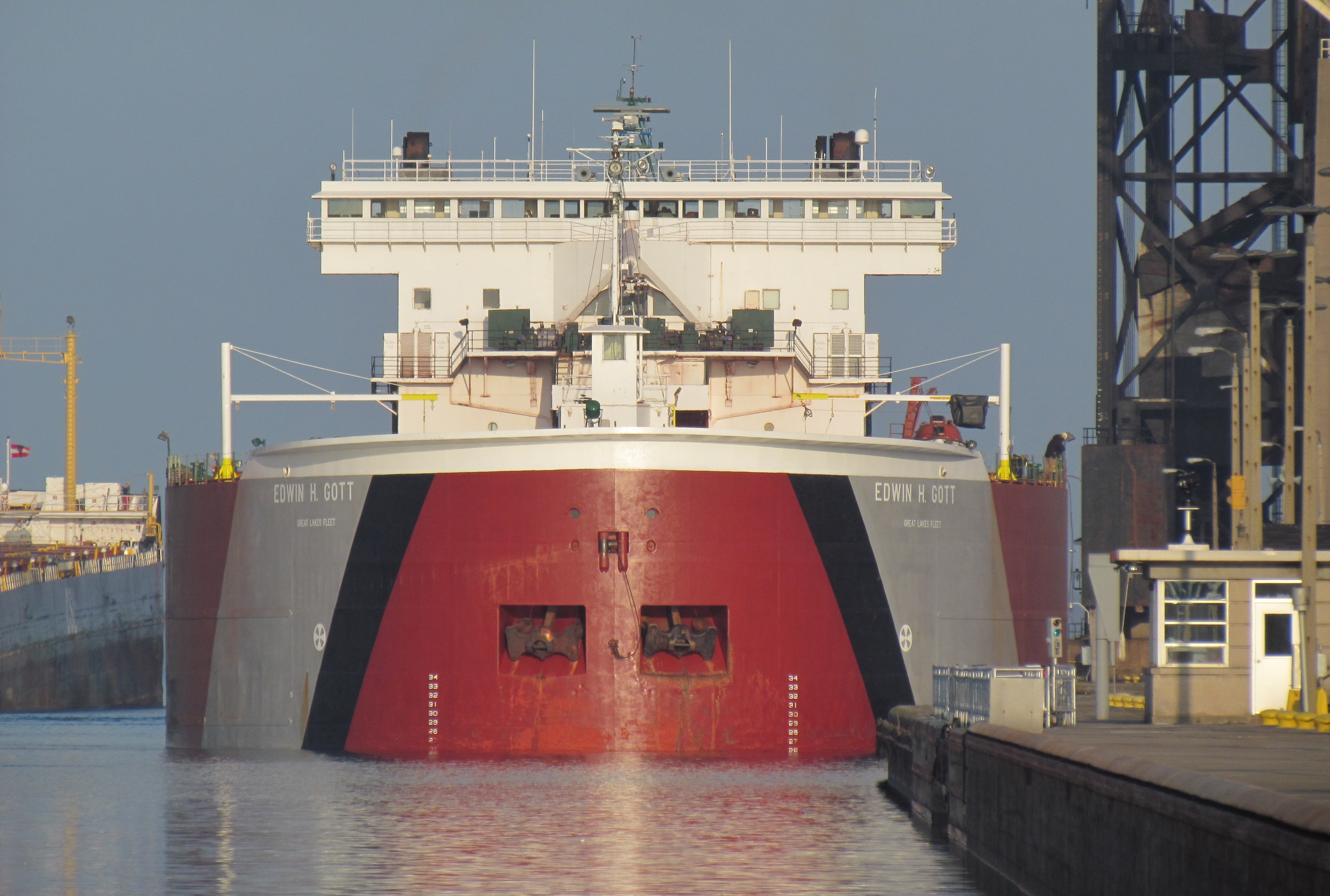
- Edwin H. Gott

History

United States
- Name: Edwin H. Gott
- Namesake: Edwin H. Gott
- Owner: Great Lakes Fleet
- Operator: Great Lakes Fleet
- Builder: Bay Shipbuilding Company
- Yard number: 718
- Launched: 1979
- Identification: Call sign: WDH7558; IMO number: 7606061
- Status: In service as of 2025

General characteristics
- Class & type: Lake freighter
- Tonnage: 35,592 GRT; 30,690 NT
- Length: 1,004 feet (306 m) oa; 990 feet (302 m)
- Beam: 105 ft (32 m)
- Draft: 32 ft (9.8 m) (Max loaded draft); 56.7 ft (17.3 m) (hull depth)
- Propulsion: two Enterprise DMRV-16-4 diesel engines, twin propellers, rated at 19,500 bhp (14,500 kW) (as built); two MaK/Caterpillar 8M43C diesel engines which each produce 9,650 hp (7,200 kW) (repowered 2011)
- Speed: 16 knots (30 km/h; 18 mph)

MV Edwin H. Gott is a very large diesel-powered lake freighter owned and operated by Great Lakes Fleet, Inc, a subsidiary of Canadian National Railway. This vessel was built in 1979 at Bay Shipbuilding Company, Sturgeon Bay, Wisconsin, and included self-unloading technology.

The ship is 1,004 feet (306 m) long and 105 feet (32 m) at the beam. It has a carrying capacity of 2,105,527 cubic feet (59,621.9 m^{3}), has a 280-foot (85 m) unloading boom and is capable of unloading 11,200 NT/hr. This is a maximum load of about 74,100 tons. The ship has five cargo holds, but 20 hatches which are 28 by 11 feet (8.5 by 3.4 m). The hatches are significantly smaller than other large lake freighters.

== History ==
The ship was originally built in 1979 for U.S. Steel and was named for their former chairman and chief executive officer, Edwin H. Gott.

The ship was originally built with two 16-cylinder Enterprise DMRV-16-4 diesel engines which powered twin propellers and was rated at 19,500 brake horsepower (14,500 kW). The ship was repowered during the winter of 2010/2011 at Bay Shipbuilding Company, Sturgeon Bay, Wisconsin. The Enterprise diessels were replaced with two 8-cylinder MaK/Caterpillar 8M43C diesel engines which each produce 9,650 horsepower (7,200 kW) and are compliant with EPA emission requirements. The project was partly funded by a $750,000 EPA Clean Diesel grant. MV Edwin H. Gott conducted sea trials of the new engines in March 2011.

When the ship was originally built, it was fitted with a shuttle boom that could extend 52 feet (16 m) to either side of the stern of the vessel. This type of boom limited which ports the vessel could unload, as it required a dockside hopper. In the layup period between the 1995 and 1996 season, the vessel returned to Bay Shipbuilding Company, Sturgeon Bay, Wisconsin, where it was fitted with a traditional unloading boom. The new boom, measuring 280 feet (85 m), is the longest self-unloading boom used on any Great Lakes vessel.
