= Clifford Hood =

American business executive (1894–1978)

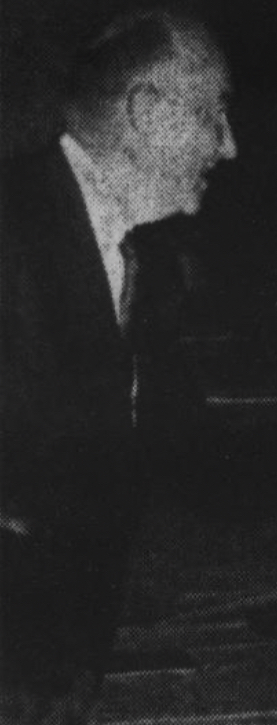
- Hood in a 1956 publication of The Washington Star

6th President of U.S. Steel
- In office January 1, 1952 – 1959
- Preceded by: Benjamin Franklin Fairless
- Succeeded by: Walter F. Munford

Personal details
- Born: 1894 Monmouth, Illinois, US
- Died: November 9, 1978 (aged 84) Palm Beach, Florida, US
- Education: University of Illinois Urbana-Champaign

Military service
- Allegiance: United States
- Battles/wars: World War I

Clifford F. Hood (1894 – November 9, 1978) was an American business executive who served as president of U.S. Steel.

== Biography ==
Hood was born 1894, near Monmouth, Illinois, and worked as a water boy from age 10. He graduated from Galesburg High School, and graduated from the University of Illinois Urbana-Champaign with a degree in electrical engineering. In 1917, he was hired as a clerk for the American Steel and Wire Company. He served in the military during World War I, and continued working at U.S. steel, becoming president of the Carnegie-Illinois Steel Company subsidiary on January 1, 1950. He was appointed president of U.S. steel on January 1, 1952, serving until 1959. During his presidency, U.S. Steel manufactured its billionth ton of steel. He continued working with the company as a chairman until 1967, when he retired and moved to Palm Beach, Florida, where he died on November 9, 1978, aged 84.

== Awards ==
- Horatio Alger Award — 1954
