= U.S. Steel =

American steel-producing company

United States Steel Corporation
- Logo used since 1958

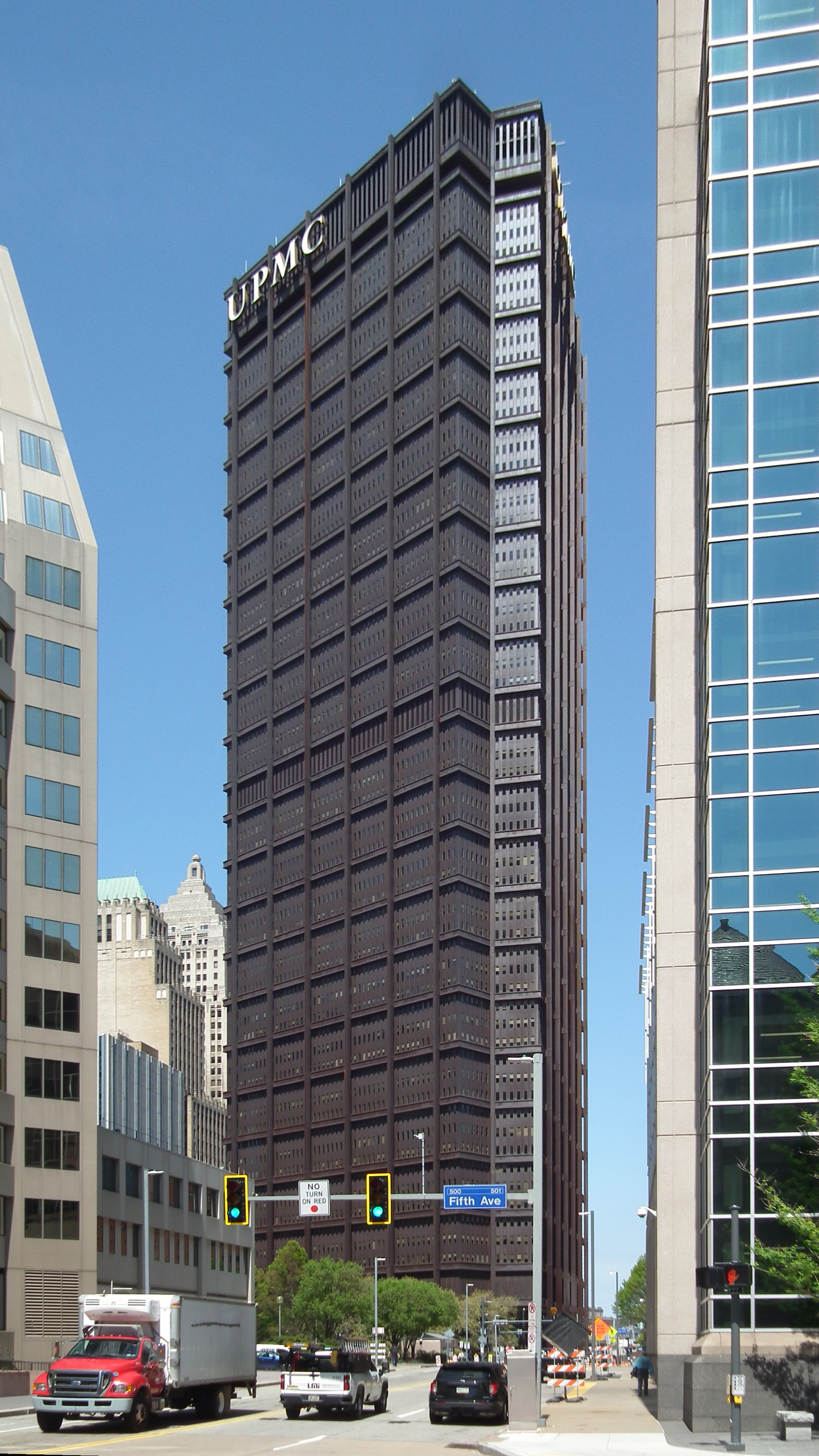
- U.S. Steel Tower in Pittsburgh
- Formerly: USX Corporation (1986–2001)
- Type: Subsidiary
- Traded as: NYSE: X (1901–2025); S&P 400 component (2014–2025); S&P 500 component (1957–2014); DJIA component (until 1991)
- Industry: Steel; Industrial manufacturing
- Predecessor: Carnegie Steel; Federal Steel Company
- Founded: March 2, 1901; 125 years ago
- Founders: Henry Clay Frick; Elbert H. Gary; William H. Moore; J. P. Morgan; Charles M. Schwab (et al.) (Note: John D. Rockefeller technically also counts as one of U.S. Steel's founders because the incorporation of his iron ore holdings were crucial to the company's formation. However, despite being a member of U.S. Steel's founding board of directors as well as one of its largest shareholders, Rockefeller took little part in its management after the fact before ultimately leaving the company altogether.)
- Headquarters: U.S. Steel Tower, Pittsburgh, Pennsylvania, United States
- Area served: Worldwide
- Key people: David S. Sutherland (chairman); David Burritt (president and CEO)
- Products: Flat-rolled steel Tubular steel Iron ore
- Revenue: ▼US$15.6 billion (2024)
- Operating income: ▼US$240 million (2024)
- Net income: ▼US$384 million (2024)
- Total assets: ▼US$20.2 billion (2024)
- Total equity: ▲US$11.3 billion (2024)
- Number of employees: 22,053 (2024)
- Parent: Nippon Steel; Federal government of the United States (golden share)
- Website: ussteel.com

The United States Steel Corporation is a Japanese-owned American steel company based in Pittsburgh, Pennsylvania, that maintains production facilities at several additional locations in the U.S. and Central Europe. The company produces and sells steel products, including flat-rolled and tubular products for customers in industries across automotive, construction, consumer, electrical, industrial equipment, distribution, and energy. Operations also include iron ore and coke production facilities. In 2025, U.S. Steel was acquired by Nippon Steel in a deal arranged with the United States government.

U.S. Steel ranked eighth among global steel producers in 2008 and 24th by 2022, remaining the second-largest in the U.S. behind Nucor. Renamed USX Corporation in 1986, it reverted to U.S. Steel in 2001 after spinning off its energy assets, including Marathon Oil. In December 2023, Nippon Steel announced a $14.9 billion acquisition of U.S. Steel, retaining its name and Pittsburgh headquarters. The deal faced opposition from the United Steelworkers, the Trump presidential campaign, and the Biden administration, which formally blocked it in January 2025. U.S. Steel and Nippon Steel sued the administration, claiming the block was unlawful. The acquisition was finalized on June 18, 2025, making U.S. Steel a subsidiary of Nippon Steel North America, with an oversight role for the federal government of the United States through a golden share.

== History ==
=== 20th century ===
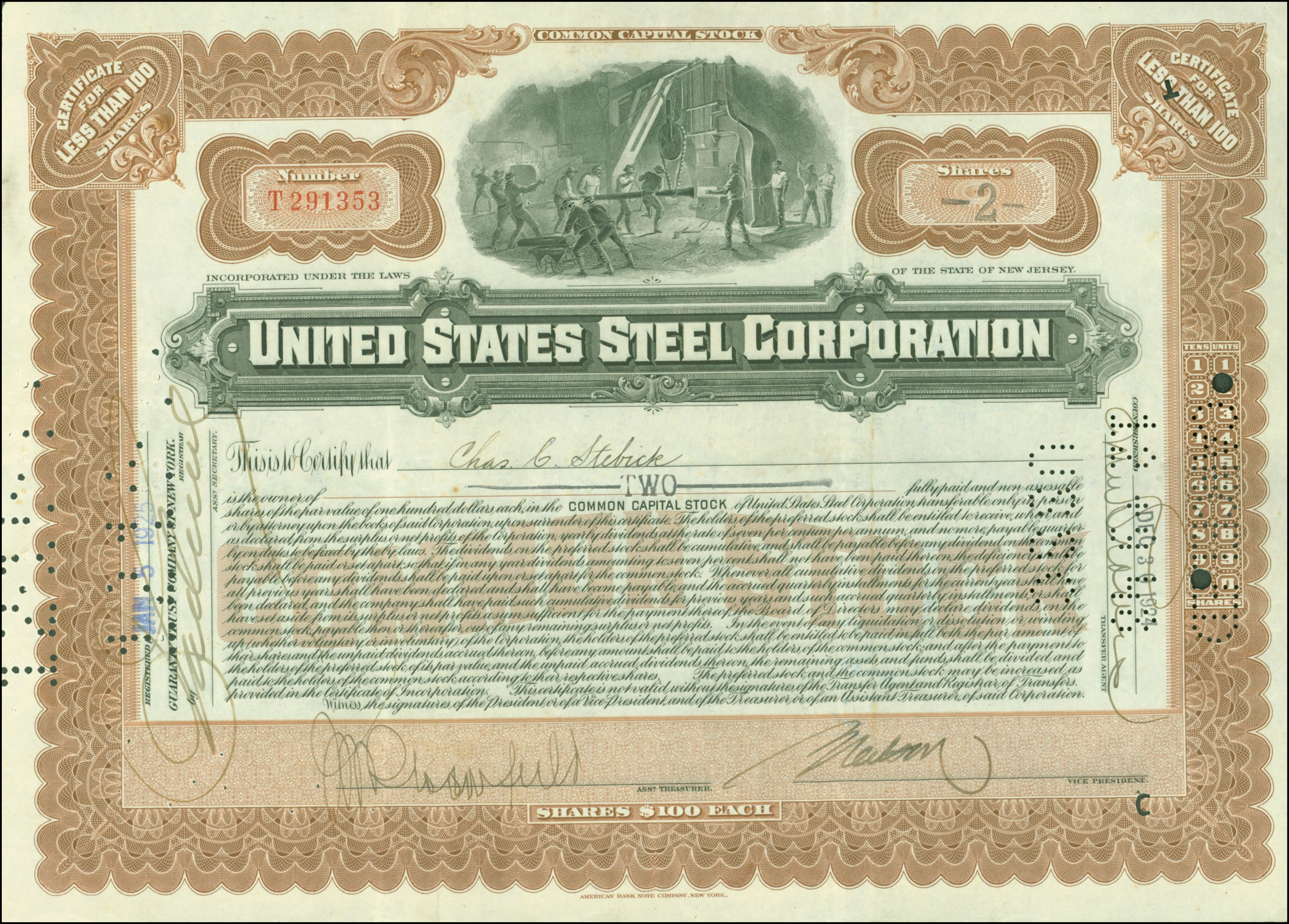
Share of the United States Steel Corporation, issued December 30, 1924

In 1901, J. P. Morgan created U.S. Steel by merging Carnegie Steel Company, Federal Steel, and National Steel for $492 million (equivalent to roughly $19 billion in 2025).

During its peak years, U.S. Steel, then known on Wall Street as "The Corporation," was known more for its size than its efficiency or innovation. In 1901, the company was far and away the largest steel manufacturer, producing roughly two-thirds of the steel in the United States. The company also operated the largest commercial fleet on the Great Lakes through its Pittsburgh Steamship Company. Due to large debts from its founding, since Andrew Carnegie demanded gold bonds for his share, and concerns about antitrust lawsuits, U.S. Steel operated cautiously.

In 1902, its first full year of operations, U.S. Steel made 67 percent of all the steel produced in the United States. In 2001, that production had fallen to only eight percent.

For much of the 20th century, U.S. Steel was both the world's largest steel producer and its largest corporation. It was capitalized at $1.4 billion ($54.2 billion today), making it the world's first billion-dollar corporation, although the U.S. Bureau of Corporations would later value it at around $700 million.

The company's headquarters was located in the Empire Building in New York City; where it remained one of the building's largest tenants for 75 years. Charles M. Schwab, the Carnegie Steel executive who originally suggested the merger to Morgan, ultimately emerged as the new corporation's first President.

In 1907, U.S. Steel acquired its largest competitor, the Tennessee Coal, Iron and Railroad Company, headquartered in Birmingham, Alabama, and Tennessee Coal was replaced on the Dow Jones Industrial Average by General Electric. The following year, in March 1908, the company formed the Committee on Safety of United States Steel following chairman Elbert H. Gary's meetings with safety managers of the operating companies, leading to the introduction of the modern "Safety First" movement. The committee's formation was intended to enhance workplace safety, reduce worker accidents, and safeguard the company against criticisms and legal liability.

U.S. Steel's primary competitor, Bethlehem Steel, led by former U.S. Steel president Charles M. Schwab, was quicker to innovate. By 1911, U.S. Steel's market share had dropped to 50 percent. That same year, James A. Farrell became president and held the position until 1932.

Also in 1911, Standard Oil was broken up by the federal government, and the U.S. government attempted to use federal antitrust laws to break up U.S. Steel, but proved unsuccessful in doing so.

In a 2008 book, author Douglas Blackmon argued that U.S. Steel’s growth in the South was attributable partly to cheap Black labor and exploited convicts. The company, Blackmon argued, leveraged Black Codes and discriminatory laws to obtain Black workers at lower costs and had agreements with over 20 Alabama counties to use convict labor, paying locals nine dollars a month per worker. Many prisoners were forced into mines under harsh conditions, with some dying from abuse and malnutrition. This convict leasing system persisted into the late 1920s and was widespread across eight Southern states, benefiting companies and farmers alike.

U.S. Steel ranked 16th among United States corporations in the value of its World War II production contracts. Production peaked at more than 35 million tons in 1953. Its employment was greatest in 1943, when it had more than 340,000 employees.

The federal government intervened to try to control U.S. Steel. In 1952, President Harry S. Truman attempted to take over the company's steel mills to resolve a crisis with its union, the United Steelworkers of America. The Supreme Court blocked the takeover by ruling that the president did not have the Constitutional authority to seize the mills. President John F. Kennedy was more successful in 1962 when he pressured the steel industry into reversing price increases that Kennedy considered dangerously inflationary.

According to author Dan Carter in The Politics Of Rage: George Wallace, The Origins Of The New Conservatism, And The Transformation Of American Politics, U.S. Steel did not support the Kennedy administration’s efforts to involve Alabama businesses in the desegregation of the University of Alabama, which Governor George Wallace had opposed.

In 1963, although the firm employed more than 30,000 workers in Birmingham, Alabama, company president Roger M. Blough "went out of his way to announce that any attempt to use his company position in Birmingham to pressure local whites was 'repugnant to me personally' and 'repugnant to my fellow officers at U.S. Steel.'"

In the years following World War II, the steel industry and heavy manufacturing went through a restructuring, leading to a decline in U.S. Steel's need for labor, production, and portfolio. Many jobs moved offshore. By 2000, the company employed 52,500 people.

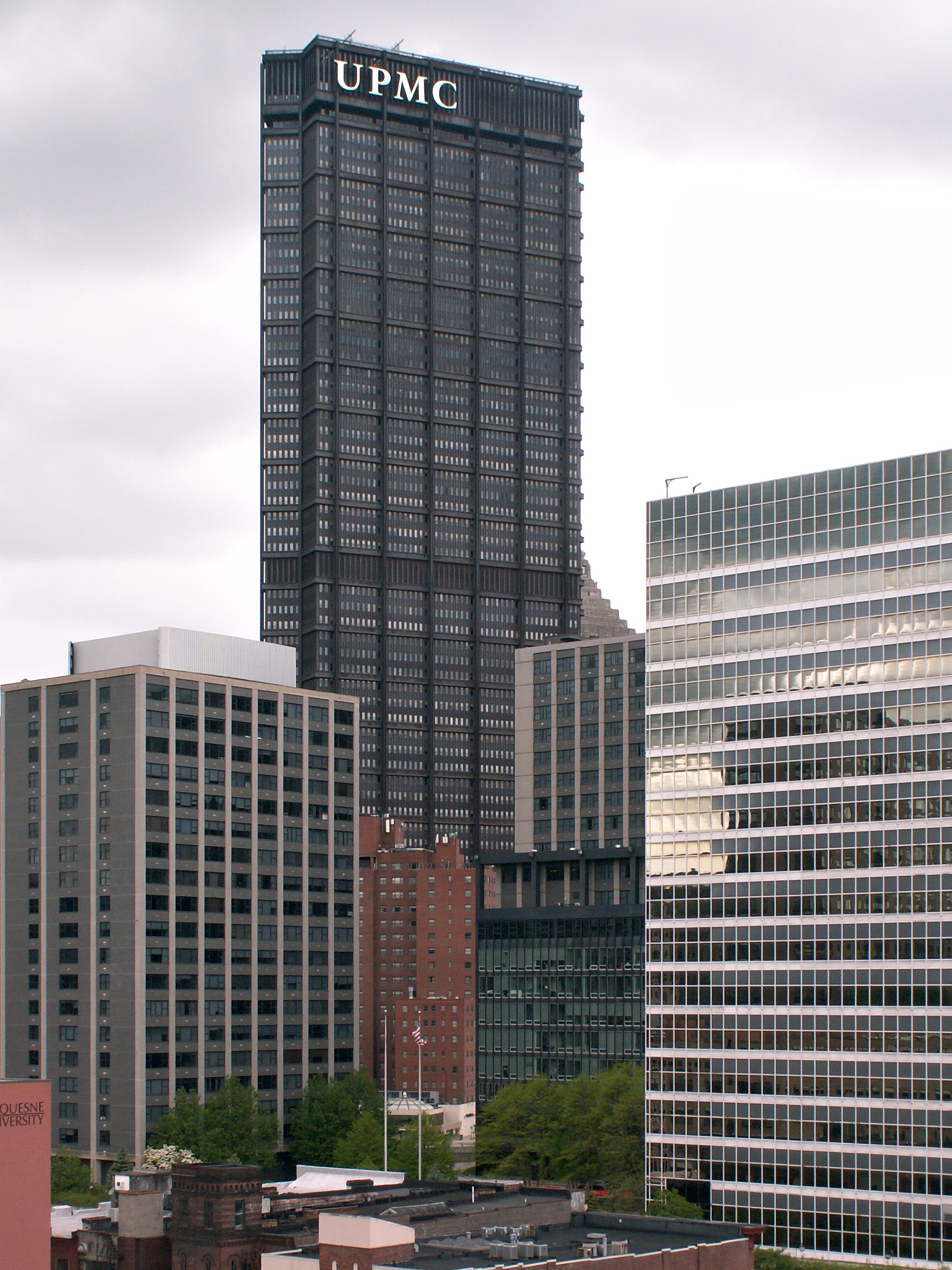
U.S. Steel Tower in Downtown Pittsburgh

In the early days of the Reagan administration, steel firms won substantial tax breaks in order to compete with imported goods. But instead of modernizing their mills, steel companies shifted capital out of steel and into more profitable areas. In March 1982, U.S. Steel took its concessions and paid $1.4 billion in cash and $4.7 billion in loans for Marathon Oil, saving approximately $500 million in taxes through the merger. The architect of tax concessions to steel firms, Senator Arlen Specter (R-PA), complained that "we go out on a limb in Congress and we feel they should be putting it in steel." The events are the subject of "The U.S. Steal Song" by folk singer Anne Feeney.

In 1984, the federal government prevented U.S. Steel from acquiring National Steel, and political pressure from the United States Congress, as well as the United Steelworkers (USW), forced the company to abandon plans to import British Steel Corporation slabs. U.S. Steel finally acquired National Steel's assets in 2003, after National Steel went bankrupt. As part of its diversification plan, U.S. Steel acquired Marathon Oil on January 7, 1982, and Texas Oil and Gas several years later. In 1986, it reorganized its holdings as USX Corporation with U.S. Steel renamed USS, Inc. as a major subsidiary.

About 22,000 USX employees stopped work on August 1, 1986, after the United Steelworkers of America and the company could not agree on new employee contract terms. This was characterized by the company as a strike and by the union as a lockout. This resulted in most USX facilities becoming idle until February 1, 1987, seriously degrading the steel division's market share. A compromise was brokered and accepted by the union membership on January 31, 1987. On February 4, 1987, three days after the agreement had been reached to end the work stoppage, USX announced that four USX plants would remain closed permanently, eliminating about 3,500 union jobs.

In late 1986, Corporate raider Carl Icahn launched a hostile takeover of the steel giant in the midst of the work stoppage. He conducted separate negotiations with the union and with management and proceeded to have proxy battles with shareholders and management. But he abandoned all efforts to buy out the company on January 8, 1987, a few weeks before union employees returned to work. By the late 20th century, U.S. Steel earned most of its revenue from energy operations.

=== 21st century ===
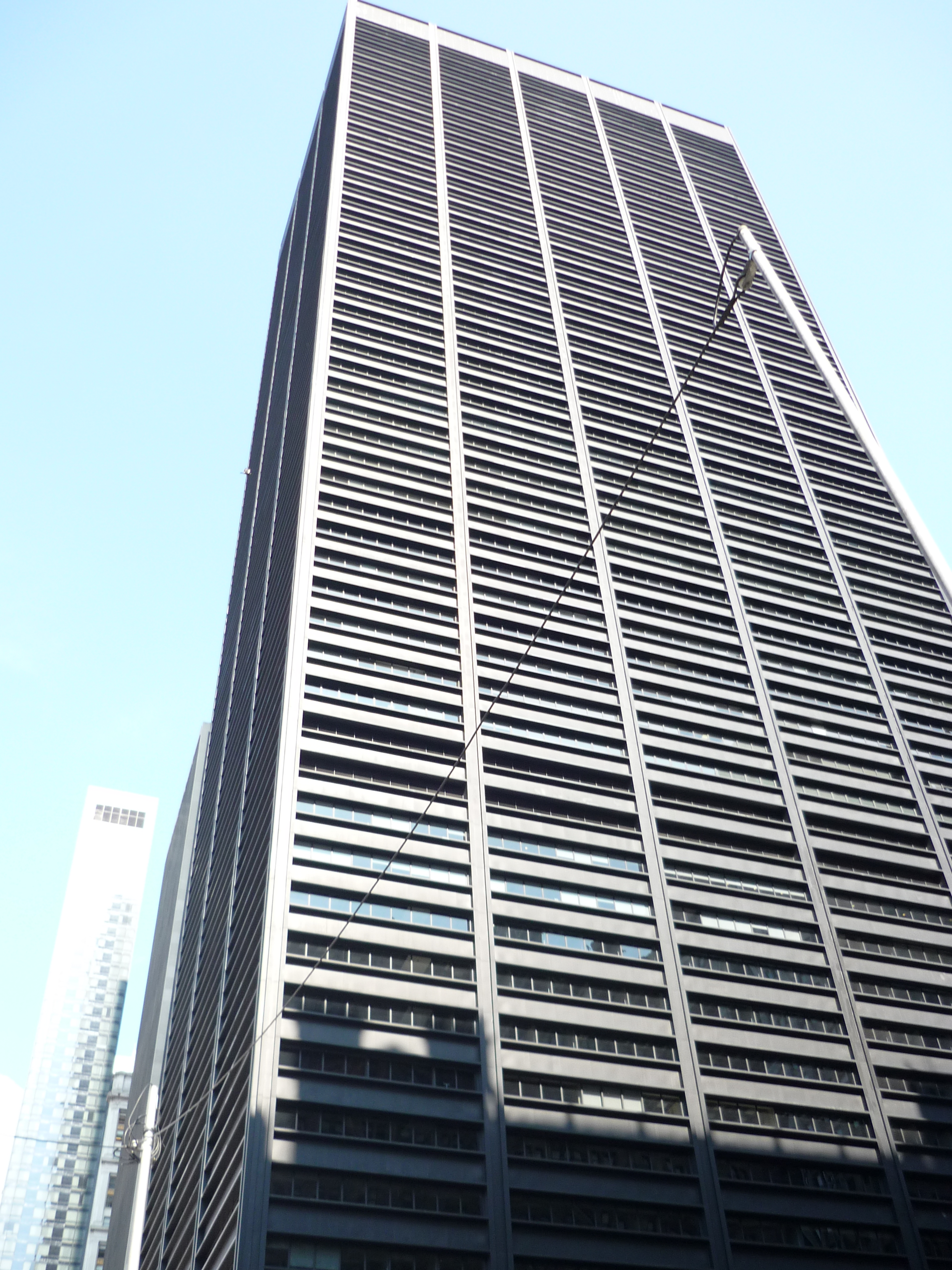
U.S. Steel Tower, now One Liberty Plaza, in New York City

In 2001, under CEO Thomas Usher, it spun off Marathon and other non-steel assets, except Transtar, and expanded internationally by acquiring plants in Slovakia and Serbia.

During the early 2010s, U.S. Steel modernized its software systems across its manufacturing facilities. Facing financial challenges, the company sold its underperforming Serbian mills near Belgrade to the Serbian government in January 2012. In 2014, U.S. Steel’s falling market value caused its removal from the S&P 500 and its transfer to the S&P MidCap 400.

However, in October 2019, U.S. Steel made a bold strategic move by investing $700 million in Big River Steel, securing a 49.9% ownership stake in the pioneering LEED-certified steel facility. Doubling down on its bet, U.S. Steel announced in December 2020 that it would acquire the remaining interest in Big River Steel for $774 million, finalizing the acquisition in January 2021.

In February 2022, U.S. Steel began construction on a new mill in Osceola, Arkansas which will be operational by 2024. In April 2022, the electric arc furnace flat-rolled Big River Steel mill in Osceola became the first ResponsibleSteel site certified in North America following an independent audit by SRI Quality System Registrar (SRI).

==== Acquisition by Nippon Steel ====
In July 2023, Cleveland-Cliffs made an offer to acquire U.S. Steel for US$7.3 billion (equivalent to $7.7 billion in 2025). This put the company into play, culminating on December 18, 2023, when Nippon Steel proposed to acquire U.S. Steel for $14.9 billion (equivalent to $15.7 billion in 2025). The Nippon proposal was approved by U.S. Steel shareholders in April 2024. Nippon pledged to keep U.S. Steel's Pittsburgh headquarters and honor union contracts.

The deal has received a range of reactions from prominent steelworkers labor union United Steelworkers (USW), policymakers, investors, and other stakeholders. On March 14, 2024, U.S. President Joe Biden declared that U.S. Steel must remain American-owned, stating the proposed acquisition by Nippon Steel would pose a risk to national security, and also declared that he would use U.S. regulatory authorities to scuttle the deal. After this revelation, it was noted the Committee on Foreign Investment in the United States (CFIUS) had the authority to block the acquisition based on national security matters.

In July 2024, Nippon Steel hired Mike Pompeo to lobby for its acquisition of U.S. Steel. By September, the Biden Administration signaled plans to block the deal, citing national security concerns. On December 10, 2024, it was reported that then U.S. President Joe Biden intended to block the proposed Nippon acquisition following the completion of a review by the Committee on Foreign Investment in the United States (CFIUS), which later concluded several weeks later.

On December 18, 2024, a letter from the CFIUS, which was written on December 14, 2024, was obtained by Reuters, which revealed that the stage was set for Biden to block the proposed Nippon Steel deal by the December 23 deadline, concluding that "The Committee has not yet reached consensus on whether the mitigation measures proposed by the Parties would be effective... or whether they would resolve the risk to U.S. national security arising from the Transaction" and that "The President may take such action for such time as the President considers appropriate to suspend or prohibit a covered transaction that threatens to impair the national security." On December 23, 2024 the CFIUS concluded its review of the proposed Nippon Steel buyout without reaching a consensus on national security risks. The proposed Nippon buyout would then be officially blocked by President Biden on January 3, 2025. On January 6, Nippon Steel and U.S. Steel sued the Biden administration over the block.

The companies also filed a RICO complaint against Cleveland-Cliffs, its CEO, and the head of the United Steelworkers, the primary union representing US Steel employees. U.S. Steel said in a statement on January 13, 2025 that it remained committed to closing the deal with Nippon Steel.

On January 27, 2025, activist investor Ancora Holdings released a proxy fight strategy with the goal of ousting CEO David Burritt and ending the litigation focused on completing the Nippon Steel acquisition. Ancora nominated Alan Kestenbaum as the new CEO, highlighting his experience in the steel industry and his vision for restoring U.S. Steel’s legacy. Kestenbaum has sought to build support for his potential leadership of U.S. Steel by meeting with White House officials, union representatives, and lawmakers. United Steelworkers President David McCall referred to Kestenbaum as "a much better choice" than current CEO David Burritt. This comment, along with growing interest from rank-and-file members, suggests a segment of the union may prefer a change in leadership rather than continuing uncertainty surrounding the proposed acquisition.

Union members have expressed frustration with the drawn-out process involving Nippon Steel’s $14.1 billion bid. Although U.S. Steel publicly supported the merger, labor groups remain concerned about the potential consequences for jobs, operations, and the company’s future under foreign ownership.

Ancora has proposed selling the company’s Big River Steel operations in Arkansas. The plan would use proceeds from the sale to modernize older unionized steel plants in Pennsylvania, Indiana, and Illinois. Ancora argues that investing in legacy facilities would support union jobs and revitalize traditional steelmaking operations. It contrasts this approach with Big River’s newer, non-union, energy-efficient model, which some in the union believe poses risks to union employment and national industrial capacity.

===== Finalized deal, golden share =====
On May 23, 2025, President Donald Trump announced a revised "planned partnership" between U.S. Steel and Nippon Steel, reversing his earlier opposition to the acquisition. Under the new terms, U.S. Steel would maintain its headquarters in Pittsburgh, and the company would be led by an American CEO with a board majority being U.S. citizens. Additionally, the U.S. government would receive a golden share allowing the U.S. president to appoint one of three board members and providing veto authority over corporate decisions, including the appointment of the other board members. Trump stated that Nippon Steel would invest $14 billion into U.S. operations, including $2.4 billion directed toward facilities in the Mon Valley region of Pennsylvania. The acquisition closed on June 18, 2025. U.S. Steel was delisted from the New York Stock Exchange on the same day.

According to Secretary of Commerce Howard Lutnick on June 14, the acquisition requires the president's approval for U.S. Steel to:

- Relocate U.S. Steel’s headquarters from Pittsburgh, Pennsylvania.
- Redomicile outside the United States
- Change the name of the company from U.S. Steel
- Reduce, waive, or delay the $14 billion of near-term investments into U.S. Steel
- Transfer production or jobs outside the United States
- Close or idle plants before certain timeframes other than normal course temporary idling for safety, upgrades, etc.
- Other protections regarding employee salaries, anti-dumping pricing, raw materials and sourcing outside the U.S., acquisitions, and more.

Later disclosures by the Securities and Exchange Commission showed that, after Trump leaves office, these powers are to transfer to the Treasury and Commerce departments.

The Cato Institute said the deal "effectively nationalizes U.S. Steel". According to Cato, "U.S. Steel’s new status as an SOE or 'public body' would mean that all its domestic transactions (yes, all) are subject to scrutiny and potential discipline under the USMCA and global anti-subsidy rules, respectively."

==== Stocks and dividends ====
U.S. Steel is a former Dow Jones Industrial Average component, listed from April 1, 1901, to May 3, 1991. It was removed under its USX Corporation name with Navistar International and Primerica. An original member of the S&P 500 since 1957, U.S. Steel was removed from that index on July 2, 2014, due to declining market capitalization.

The Board of Directors considers the declaration of dividends four times each year, with checks for dividends declared on common stock mailed for receipt on March, June, September, and December. In 2008, the dividend was $0.30 per share, the highest in company history. By April 27, 2009, however, it was reduced to $0.05 per share. In February 2020, the dividend was reduced to $0.01 per share but was then later increased back to $0.05 per share in November 2021.

== Legal issues ==
=== Labor ===
U.S. Steel maintained the labor policies of Andrew Carnegie. Carnegie believed that "good wages and good workmen I know to be cheap labor." The Amalgamated Association of Iron and Steel Workers union that represented workers at the Homestead, Pennsylvania, plant was, for many years, broken after a violent strike in 1892. U.S. Steel defeated another strike in 1901, the year it was founded. U.S. Steel built the city of Gary, Indiana, in 1906, and 100 years later it remained the location of the largest integrated steel mill in the Northern Hemisphere. U.S. Steel reached a détente with unions during World War I, when under pressure from the Wilson Administration it relaxed its opposition to unions enough to allow some to operate in certain factories. It returned to its previous policies as soon as the war ended, however, and in a 1919 strike defeated union-organizing efforts by William Z. Foster of the AFL.

Heavy pressure from public opinion forced the company to give up its 12-hour day and adopt the standard eight-hour day. During the 1920s, U.S. Steel, like many other large employers, coupled paternalistic employment practices with "employee representation plans" (ERPs), which were company unions sponsored by management. These ERPs eventually became an important factor leading to the organization of the United Steelworkers of America. The company dropped its hard-line, anti-union stance in 1937, when Myron Taylor, then president of U.S. Steel, agreed to recognize the Steel Workers Organizing Committee, an arm of the Congress of Industrial Organizations (CIO) led by John L. Lewis. Taylor was an outsider, brought in during the Great Depression to rescue U.S. Steel. Watching the upheaval caused by the United Auto Workers' successful sit-down strike in Flint, Michigan, and convinced that Lewis was someone he could deal with on a businesslike basis, Taylor sought stability through collective bargaining.

Still, U.S. Steel worked hand-in-hand with the Birmingham (Alabama) Police Department as it vigorously investigated and targeted labor activities during the 1930s and 1940s. The corporation developed and fed information to a "Red Squad" of detectives "who used the city's vagrancy and criminal-anarchy statutes (liberally reinforced by backroom beatings) to strike at radical labor organizers." In the 1950s, those investigations shifted from labor to civil rights activists.

The Steelworkers continue to have a contentious relationship with U.S. Steel, but far less so than the relationship that other unions had with employers in other industries in the United States. They launched a number of long strikes against U.S. Steel in 1946 and a 116-day strike in 1959, but those strikes were over wages and benefits and not the more fundamental issue of union recognition that led to violent strikes elsewhere.

The Steelworkers union attempted to mollify the problems of competitive foreign imports by entering into a so-called Experimental Negotiation Agreement (ENA) in 1974. This was to provide for arbitration if the parties were not able to reach an agreement on any new collective bargaining agreements, thereby preventing disruptive strikes. The ENA failed to stop the decline of the steel industry in the U.S.

U.S. Steel and the other employers terminated the ENA in 1984. In 1986, U.S. Steel employees stopped work after a dispute over contract terms, characterized by the company as a strike and by the union as a lockout. In a letter to striking employees in 1986, Johnston warned, "There are not enough seats in the steel lifeboat for everybody." In addition to reducing the role of unions, the steel industry had sought to induce the federal government to take action to counteract the dumping of steel by foreign producers at below-market prices. Neither the concessions nor anti-dumping laws have restored the industry to the health and prestige it once had.

In December 2022, a new four-year contract was ratified between members of the United Steelworkers union and U.S. Steel. This contract covers 11,000 workers at 13 locations. The new agreements were retroactive to September 1, 2022, and included a 5% base wage increase each year for the four years, a $4,000 bonus upon ratification of the deal, $0.50/hour increase in hourly contributions to the Steel Workers Pension Trust, $0.10/hour increase in 401(k) contributions, and uncapped profit-sharing.

=== Environmental record ===
During the 1948 Donora smog, an air inversion trapped industrial effluent (air pollution) from the American Steel and Wire plant and U.S. Steel's Donora Zinc Works in Donora, Pennsylvania.

In three days, 20 people died... After the inversion lifted, another 50 died, including Lukasz Musial, the father of baseball great Stan Musial. Hundreds more lived the rest of their lives with damaged lungs and hearts. But another 40 years would pass before the whole truth about Donora's bad air made public-health history.

Today the Donora Smog Museum in that city tells of the influence that the hazardous Donora Smog had on the air quality standards enacted by the federal government in subsequent years.

Researchers at the Political Economy Research Institute have ranked U.S. Steel as the 58th-greatest corporate producer of air pollution in the United States (down from their 2000 ranking as the second-greatest). In 2008, the company released more than one million kg (2.2 million pounds) of toxins, chiefly ammonia, hydrochloric acid, ethylene, zinc compounds, methanol, and benzene, but including manganese, cyanide, and chromium compounds. In 2004, the city of River Rouge, Michigan, and the residents of River Rouge and the nearby city of Ecorse filed a class-action lawsuit against the company for "the release and discharge of air particulate matter ... and other toxic and hazardous substances" at its River Rouge plant.

The company has also been implicated in generating water pollution and toxic waste. In 1993, the Environmental Protection Agency (EPA) issued an order for U.S. Steel to clean up a site on the Delaware River in Fairless Hills, Pennsylvania, where the soil had been contaminated with arsenic, lead, and other heavy metals, as well as naphthalene. Groundwater at the site was found to be polluted with polycyclic aromatic hydrocarbons and trichloroethylene (TCE). In 2005, the EPA, United States Department of Justice, and the State of Ohio reached a settlement requiring U.S. Steel to pay more than $100,000 in penalties and $294,000 in reparations in answer to allegations that the company illegally released pollutants into Ohio waters. U.S. Steel's Gary, Indiana facility has been repeatedly charged with discharging polluted wastewater into Lake Michigan and the Grand Calumet River. In 1998 the company agreed to payment of a $30 million settlement to clean up contaminated sediments from a five-mile (8 km) stretch of the river.

With the exception of the Fairless Hills and Gary facilities, the lawsuits concern facilities acquired by U.S. Steel via its 2003 purchase of National Steel Corporation, not its historic facilities.

In 2021, U.S. Steel announced a goal to target net-zero carbon emissions by 2050. The company previously set a target to reduce greenhouse gas emissions intensity by 20% by 2030.

== Legacy ==
=== U.S. Steel Tower ===
The U.S. Steel Tower in Pittsburgh, Pennsylvania, is named after the company and since 1970, the company's corporate headquarters have been located there. It is the tallest skyscraper in the downtown Pittsburgh skyline, built out of the company's Corten Steel. New York City's One Liberty Plaza was also built by the corporation as that city's U.S. Steel Tower in 1973.

=== Steelmark logo ===
The "Steelmark" logo, originated by U.S. Steel

When the Steelmark logo was created, U.S. Steel attached the following meaning to it: "Steel lightens your work, brightens your leisure and widens your world." The logo was used as part of a major marketing campaign to educate consumers about how important steel is in people's daily lives. The Steelmark logo was used in print, radio and television ads as well as on labels for all steel products, from steel tanks to tricycles to filing cabinets.

In the 1960s, U.S. Steel turned over the Steelmark program to the AISI, where it came to represent the steel industry as a whole. During the 1970s, the logo's meaning was extended to include the three materials used to produce steel: yellow for coal, orange for ore and blue for steel scrap. In the late 1980s, when the AISI founded the Steel Recycling Institute (SRI), the logo took on a new life reminiscent of its 1950s meaning.

The Pittsburgh Steelers professional football team borrowed elements of its logo, a circle containing three hypocycloids, from the Steelmark logo belonging to the American Iron and Steel Institute (AISI) and created by U.S. Steel. In the 1950s, when helmet logos became popular, the Steelers added players' numbers to either side of their gold helmets. Later that decade, the numbers were removed and in 1962, Cleveland's Republic Steel suggested to the Steelers that they use the Steelmark as a helmet logo.

U.S. Steel financed and constructed the Unisphere in Flushing Meadows-Corona Park, Queens, New York, for the 1964 World's Fair. It is the largest globe ever made and is one of the world's largest free-standing sculptures.

=== Chicago Picasso sculpture ===
The Chicago Picasso sculpture was fabricated by U.S. Steel in Gary, Indiana, before being disassembled and relocated to Chicago. U.S. Steel donated the steel for the construction of St. Michael's Catholic Church in Chicago since 90 percent of the parishioners worked at its mills.

=== United States Steel Hour television program and Walt Disney World involvement ===
U.S. Steel sponsored The United States Steel Hour television program from 1945 until 1963 on CBS. U.S. Steel built both the Disney's Contemporary Resort and the Disney's Polynesian Resort in 1971 at Walt Disney World, in part to showcase its residential steel building "modular" products to high-end and luxury consumers.

This same U.S. Steel manufacturing plant that was located on Disney property also helped build the now defunct Court of Flags Resort in Orlando, Florida, on Major Blvd.

=== Real estate development ===
U.S. Steel was also involved with Florida real estate development including building beachfront condominiums during the 1970s, such as Sand Key near Daytona Beach, Florida, and the Pasadena Yacht and Country Club near St. Petersburg, Florida.

== Facilities ==
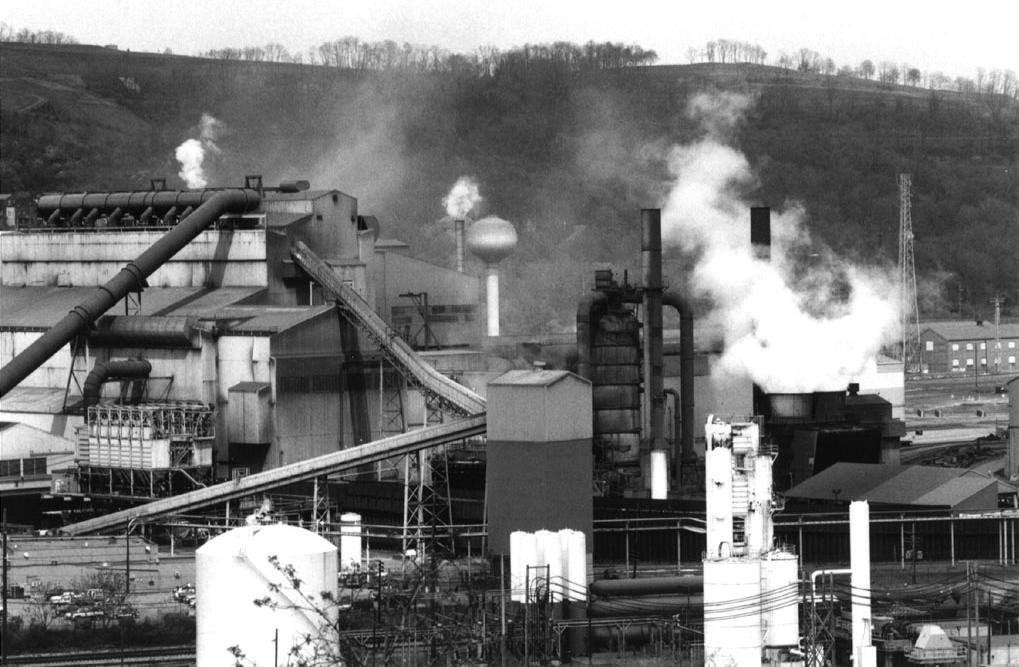
A basic oxygen process (BOP) shop and Ladle Metallurgy Facility of the Edgar Thomson Steel Works in the mid-1990s

U.S. Steel has multiple domestic and international facilities.

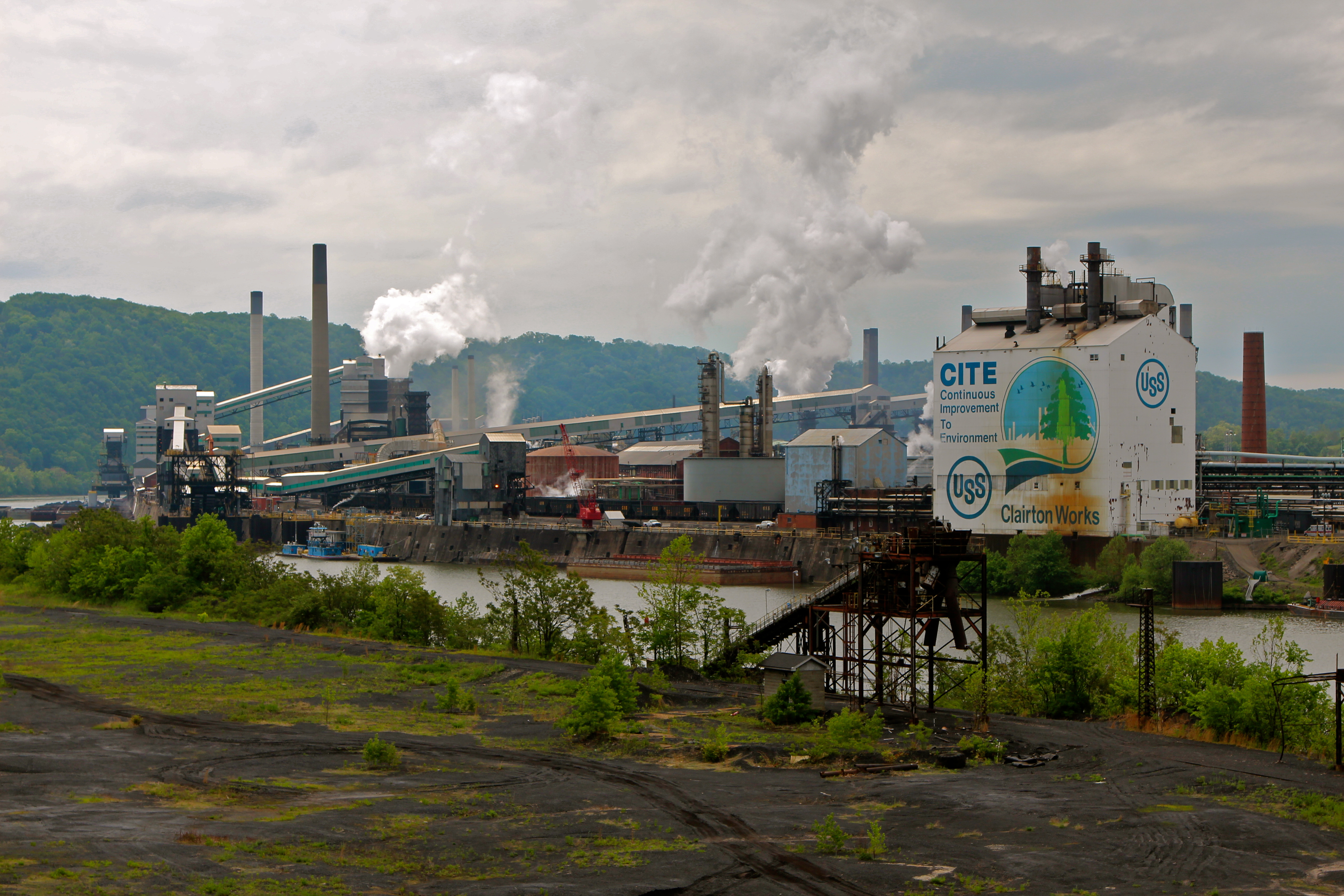
Clairton Coke Works in Clairton, Pennsylvania

Of note in the United States are Clairton Coke Works, Edgar Thomson Works, and Irvin Plant, which are all members of Mon Valley Works just outside Pittsburgh, Pennsylvania. Clairton Works is the largest coking facility in North America. Edgar Thomson Works is one of the oldest steel mills in the world. The company acquired Great Lakes Works and Granite City Works, both large integrated steel mills, in 2003 and is partnered with Severstal North America in operating the world's largest electro-galvanizing line, Double Eagle Steel Coating Company at the historic Rouge complex in Dearborn, Michigan.

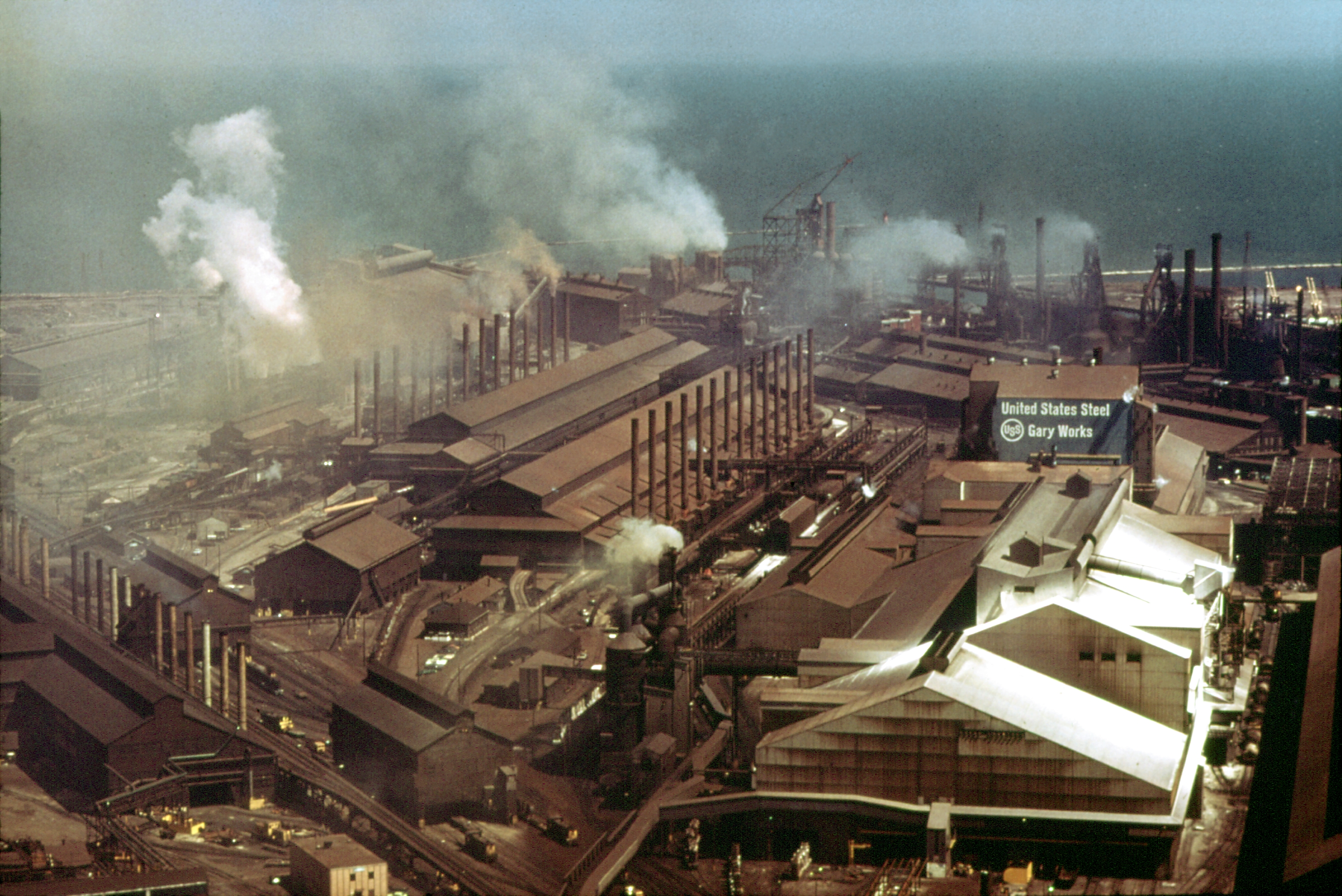
The Gary Works in Gary, Indiana, is the largest integrated mill in North America.

U.S. Steel's largest domestic facility is Gary Works, in Gary, Indiana, on the shore of Lake Michigan. For many years, the Gary Works Plant was the world-largest steel mill and it remains the largest integrated mill in North America. It was built in 1906 and has been operating since June 28, 1908. Gary is also home to the U.S. Steel Yard baseball stadium.

U.S. Steel operates a tin mill in East Chicago now known as East Chicago Tin. The mill was idled in 2015, but reopened shortly after. The mill was then 'permanently idled' in 2019, however the facility remains in possession of the corporation as of early 2020.

U.S. Steel operates a sheet and tin finishing facility in Portage, Indiana, known as Midwest Plant, acquired after the National Steel Corporation bankruptcy. U.S. Steel acquired National Steel Corporation in May 2003 for $850 million and assumption of $200 million in debt. U.S. Steel operates Great Lakes Works in Ecorse, Michigan, Midwest Plant in Portage, Indiana, and Granite City Steel in Granite City, Illinois. In 2008 a major expansion of Granite City was announced, including a new coke plant with an annual capacity of 650,000 tons.

U.S. Steel operates Fairfield Works in Fairfield, Alabama (Birmingham), employing 1,500 people, and operates a sheet galvanizing operation at the Fairless Works facility in Fairless Hills, Pennsylvania, employing 75 people.

U.S. Steel operates three pipe mills: Fairfield Tubular Operations in Fairfield, Alabama (Birmingham), McKeesport Tubular Operations, in McKeesport, Pennsylvania, and Texas Operations (Formerly Lone Star Steel) in Lone Star, Texas. A fourth pipe mill, Lorain Tubular Operations in Lorain, Ohio is no longer operating at this time.

U.S. Steel operates two major taconite mining and pelletizing operations in northeastern Minnesota's Iron Range under the operating name Minnesota Ore Operations. The Minntac mine is located near Mountain Iron, Minnesota, and the Keetac mine is near Keewatin, Minnesota. U.S. Steel announced on February 1, 2008, that it would be investing approximately $300 million in upgrading (project later abandoned) the operations at Keetac, a facility purchased in 2003 from the now-defunct National Steel Corporation. In December 2022, an investment of $150 million was made in the plant.

U.S. Steel has completely closed nine of its major integrated mills. The Duluth Works in Duluth, Minnesota, closed in 1973. The Worcester Works in Worcester, Massachusetts closed in 1977. The Ohio Works and Macdonald Works in Youngstown, Ohio, closed in 1980, the Duquesne Works in Duquesne, Pennsylvania, and Ensley Works in Ensley, Alabama in 1984, the Homestead Works in Homestead, Pennsylvania, in 1986. Geneva Steel in Vineyard, Utah, was sold in 1987, South Chicago's South Works closed in 1992, followed by the National Tube Works in Mckeesport, Pennsylvania, in 2014.

Internationally, U.S. Steel operates facilities in Slovakia (former Východoslovenské železiarne in Košice). It also operated facilities in Serbia – former Sartid with facilities in Smederevo (steel plant, hot and cold mill) and Šabac (tin mill).

U.S. Steel added facilities in Texas with the purchase of Lone Star Steel Company in 2007.

The company operates two joint ventures in Pittsburg, California, with POSCO of South Korea.

U.S. Steel added facilities in Hamilton and Nanticoke, Ontario, Canada, with the purchase of Stelco (now U.S. Steel Canada) in 2007. These facilities were sold in 2016 to venture capital firm Bedrock Resources and has since been renamed Stelco. The blast furnace in Hamilton has not been reactivated as they were shut down by U.S. Steel in 2013, and since has been demolished. The blast furnace in Nanticoke is now operating.

The company opened a training facility, the Mon Valley Works Training Hub, in Duquesne, Pennsylvania, in 2008. The state-of-the-art facility, located on a portion of the property once occupied by the company's Duquesne Works, serves as the primary training site for employees at U.S. Steel's three Pittsburgh-area Mon Valley Works locations. This site also served as the company's temporary technical support headquarters during the 2009 G20 Summit.

In January 2021, U.S. Steel fully acquired Big River Steel in northeast Arkansas. In February 2022, U.S. Steel began construction of a new mill in Osceola, Arkansas, which is expected to be operational by 2024. The new Osceola plant will be adjacent to U.S. Steel's Big River Steel. Together the facilities will be known as Big River Steel Works.

In June 2022, U.S. Steel signed a non-binding letter of intent with SunCoke Energy that would allow SunCoke to purchase two blast furnaces from U.S. Steel's Granite City Works for use in pig iron fabrication.

In June 2026, the company announced major upgrades to its Mon Valley Works, with a plan to include a new hot strip mill at the Edgar Thomson plant in Braddock.

Locations
State	Facility	Status
Pennsylvania (Pittsburgh)	Mon Valley Works	Open
Pennsylvania (Fairless Hills)	Fairless Works	Open
Pennsylvania (Pittsburgh)	Duquesne Works	Closed 1984
Pennsylvania (Homestead)	Homestead Works	Closed 1986
Pennsylvania (McKeesport)	McKeesport Tubular	Closed 2014
Indiana (Portage)	Midwest Plant	Open
Indiana (Gary)	Gary Works	Open
Indiana (East Chicago)	East Chicago Tin	Closed 2019
Illinois (Granite City)	Granite City Works	Open
Illinois (Chicago)	South Works	Closed 1992
Massachusetts (Worcester)	Worcester Works	Closed 1977
Minnesota (Iron Range)	Minntac Mine, Keetac Mine	Open
Minnesota (Duluth)	Duluth Works	Closed 1973
Ohio (Lorain)	Lorain Tubular	Idled
Ohio (Youngstown)	Ohio Works	Closed 1980
Michigan (Ecorse)	Great Lakes Works	Open
Michigan (Dearborn)	Double Eagle Steel Coating	Closed 2014
Alabama (Birmingham)	Fairfield Works, Fairfield Tubular	Open
Alabama (Ensley)	Ensley Works	Closed 1984
Arkansas (Osceola)	Big River Steel Works	Opened 2021
Texas (Lone Star)	Texas Operations	Open 2007
Utah (Vineyard)	Geneva Steel	Sold 1987

=== Railroad ownership ===
U.S. Steel once owned the Northampton and Bath Railroad. The N&B was an 11-kilometer (6.8 mi) Shortline railroad built in 1904 that served Atlas Cement in Northampton, Pennsylvania, and Keystone Cement in Bath, Pennsylvania. By 1979 cement shipments had dropped off such that the railroad was no longer economically viable, and U.S. Steel abandoned the line. A 1.5-kilometer (0.93 mi) section of track was retained to serve Atlas Cement. The remainder of the right-of-way was transformed into the Nor-Bath Trail. U.S. Steel also owned the Atlantic City Mine Railroad, whose 76.7-mile (123.4 km) line in Wyoming operated from 1962 until 1983 and served an iron ore mine north of Atlantic City, Wyoming.

Through its Transtar subsidiary, U.S. Steel also owned other railroads that served its mines and mills. Those properties included the Duluth, Missabe & Iron Range Railway in the iron-mining region of northeast Minnesota; the Elgin, Joliet & Eastern that served its Gary Works in northwest Indiana; the Birmingham Southern Railroad serving the U.S. Steel mill in Birmingham, Alabama; and the Bessemer & Lake Erie and Union railroads in western Pennsylvania that delivered iron ore and provided plant-switching services at its mill complex in Braddock, Pennsylvania and coke works in Clairton, Pennsylvania.

U.S. Steel also owned a large Great Lakes commercial freighter fleet, under the Pittsburgh Steamship Company, that transported its raw materials from the Duluth area to Ashtabula, Ohio; Gary, Indiana; and Conneaut, Ohio. The laker fleet, the B&LE, and the DM&IR were acquired by Canadian National after U.S. Steel sold most of Transtar to that company. The ships are leased out to a different, domestic operator because of the United States cabotage law.

== Corporate social responsibility ==
In January 2025, U.S. Steel received the Equality 100 Award from the Human Rights Campaign Foundation (HRCF) after earning a perfect score on the Corporate Equality Index (CEI) for the fifth consecutive year.

== Corporate affairs ==
=== Business trends ===
The key trends for U.S. Steel are (as of the financial year ending December 31):

Year	Revenue in million USD	Net income in million USD	Total assets in million USD	Employees
2010	17,374	−482	15,350	42,000
2011	19,884	−53	16,073	43,000
2012	19,328	−124	15,217	39,000
2013	17,424	−1,645	13,143	26,000
2014	17,507	102	12,013	23,000
2015	11,574	−1,642	9,167	21,000
2016	10,261	−440	9,160	29,800
2017	12,250	387	9,862	29,200
2018	14,178	1,115	10,982	29,000
2019	12,937	−630	11,608	27,500
2020	9,741	−1,165	12,059	23,350
2021	20,275	4,174	17,816	24,540
2022	21,065	2,524	19,458	22,740
2023	18,053	895	20,451	21,803
2024	15,640	384	20,235	22,053

=== Ownership ===
U.S. Steel was mainly owned by institutional investors. The 10 largest shareholders in late 2024 were:

- BlackRock (11.72%)
- The Vanguard Group (9.08%)
- Pentwater Capital Management (8.18%)
- State Street Corporation (4.18%)
- Dimensional Fund Advisors (4.10%)
- Massachusetts Financial Services (2.40%)
- T. Rowe Price (2.12%)
- Donald Smith & Co (2.11%)
- KGH Ltd. (2.03%)
- Geode Capital Management (1.71%)

=== Presidents ===
- Charles M. Schwab (1901–1903)
- William E. Corey (1903–1911)
- James Augustine Farrell, Sr.– (1911–1932)
- William A. Irvin (April 19, 1932 – January 1, 1938)
- Benjamin Franklin Fairless (1938–1952)
- Clifford Hood (1952–1959)
- Walter F. Munford (May 5, 1959 – September 8, 1959)
- Leslie B. Worthington (1959–1967)
- Edwin H. Gott (1967–1969)
- Edgar B. Speer (1969–1973)
- David M. Roderick (1973–1979)
- William Roesch (1979–1983)
- Charles A. Corry (January 25, 1988 – May 31, 1989)
- Thomas J. Usher (1994–1995)
- Paul J. Wilhelm (1994–2001)
- Thomas J. Usher (2001–2003)
- John P. Surma (2003–2013)
- Mario Longhi— President & CEO of U.S. Steel (September 1, 2013 – May 10, 2017)
- David Burritt— President & CEO (May 10, 2017 – present)

=== Chairmen of the Board of Directors ===
- Elbert Henry Gary (1901–1927)
- J. P. Morgan Jr. (1927–1932)
- Myron Charles Taylor (1932–1938)
- Edward Stettinius Jr. (1938–1940)
- Irving Sands Olds (1940–1952)
- Benjamin Franklin Fairless— Chairman & CEO of U.S. Steel (1952–1955)
- Roger Blough— Chairman & CEO (3 May 1955 – 31 January 1969)
- Edwin H. Gott— Chairman & CEO (January 31, 1969 – March 1, 1973)
- Edgar B. Speer— Chairman & CEO (March 1, 1973 – April 24, 1979)
- David M. Roderick— Chairman & CEO (April 24, 1979 – May 31, 1989)
- Charles A. Corry— Chairman & CEO (May 31, 1989 – July 1, 1995)
- Thomas Usher— Chairman & CEO (July 1, 1995 – October 1, 2004)
- John P. Surma— Chairman & CEO (October 1, 2004 – December 31, 2013)
- David S. Sutherland— Non-executive Chairman of the Board (2014—present)

== See also ==
- History of the steel industry (1850–1970)
- Iron and steel industry in the United States
- Weathering steel

== Bibliography ==
- Brawley, Mark R. " 'And we would have the field': US Steel and American trade policy, 1908–1912." Business and Politics 19.3 (2017): 424–453.
- Brody, David (1987). Labor in Crisis: The Steel Strike of 1919. University of Illinois Press. ISBN 978-0-252-01373-7. Archived from the original on July 16, 2012 – via Questia.
- Burn, Duncan (1961). The Steel Industry, 1939–1959: A Study in Competition and Planning. Cambridge: Cambridge University Press. ISBN 978-0-521-04385-4. Archived from the original on October 19, 2010 – via Questia.
- Chernow, Ron (1999). Titan: The Life of John D. Rockefeller Sr. New York City, United States: Vintage Books; Random House, Inc. ISBN 0-679-75703-1.
- Hall, Christopher G.L. Steel phoenix: The fall and rise of the US steel industry (Palgrave Macmillan, 1997)
- "Phipps, William Arthur". Press Reference Library, Volume 1: Notables of the West; Being the Portraits and Biographies of the Progressive Men of the West who Have Helped in the Development and History Making of this Wonderful Country. International News Service. 1913. pp. 137–138.
- Meade, Edward Sherwood (August 1901). "The Genesis of the United States Steel Corporation". The Quarterly Journal of Economics. 15 (4): 517–550. doi:10.2307/1884974. JSTOR 1884974.
- Meade, Edward Sherwood (February 1902). "Capitalization of the United States Steel Corporation". The Quarterly Journal of Economics. 16 (2): 214–232. doi:10.2307/1882744. JSTOR 1882744.
- Misa, Thomas (1998). Nation of Steel: The Making of Modern America, 1865–1925. Johns Hopkins University Press. ISBN 978-0-8018-6052-2.
- Scheuerman, William (1986). The Steel Crisis: The Economics and Politics of a Declining Industry. New York: Praeger Publishers. ISBN 978-0-275-92124-8. Archived from the original on October 28, 2010 – via Questia.
- Seely, Bruce Edsall, ed. Iron and Steel in the Twentieth Century (Facts on File, 1994) 512 pp, an encyclopedia
- Skrabec, Quentin R. (2010). Henry Clay Frick: The Life of the Perfect Capitalist. Jefferson, N.C.: McFarland & Co. ISBN 978-0-7864-4383-3.
- Urofsky, Melvin (1969). Big Steel and the Wilson Administration: A Study in Business-Government Relations. Columbus, Ohio: Ohio State University Press. Archived from the original on October 19, 2010 – via Questia.
- Vivian, Cassandra (2020). Henry Clay Frick and the Golden Age of Coal and Coke, 1870–1920. Jefferson, NC: McFarland & Company, Inc. ISBN 978-1-4766-3980-2.
- Warne, Colston (1963). R.D. Cross (ed.). The Steel Strike of 1919. D. C. Heath. Archived from the original on July 16, 2012 – via Questia.
- Warren, Kenneth (1996). Triumphant Capitalism: Henry Clay Frick and the Industrial Transformation of America. Pittsburgh, PA: University of Pittsburgh Press. ISBN 0-8229-3889-8.
- Warren, Kenneth (2001). Big Steel: The First Century of the United States Steel Corporation, 1901–2001. University of Pittsburgh Press. ISBN 978-0-8229-4160-6.
- Warren, Kenneth. The American steel industry, 1850–1970: a geographical interpretation (University of Pittsburgh Press, 1987)
- "History of U.S. Steel". U.S. Steel.
