= Qteros =

- Company type: Private company
- Industry: Biofuels, cellulosic ethanol
- Founded: 2005
- Headquarters: Marlborough, Massachusetts, United States
- Key people: Stephen Rogers, CEO

Qteros, Inc. is an American energy company researching the production of cellulosic ethanol from a variety of non-food feedstock sources including corn stover, corn cobs, switchgrass, and sugar cane bagasse.

Qteros's process combines proprietary science and microbiology that enables a simplified biomass-to-ethanol conversion. Their proprietary microorganism is the Q Microbe® (Clostridium phytofermentans).

In January 2011, Qteros announced its partnership with Praj Industries of India, a publicly traded builder of ethanol plants. Praj Industries has built about 70% of the 400 ethanol mills in India.

In November 2011, the company reduced staff and sought additional financing.

== Change of Management and Ownership ==
In late 2012, Qteros went through a change of management and ownership, with founding COO Stephen Rogers taking over the role of CEO. Qteros continues to develop and scale its technology in collaboration with significant international partners.
