= Roger Blough =

American businessman (1904–1985)

Roger M. Blough
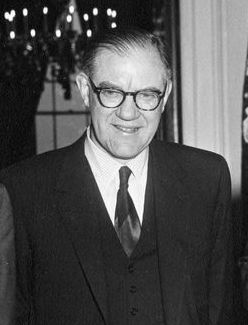
- Blough in 1961.

Chairman & CEO of U.S. Steel
- In office May 3, 1955 – January 31, 1969
- Preceded by: Benjamin Fairless
- Succeeded by: Edwin H. Gott

Personal details
- Born: January 19, 1904
- Died: October 8, 1985 (aged 81)

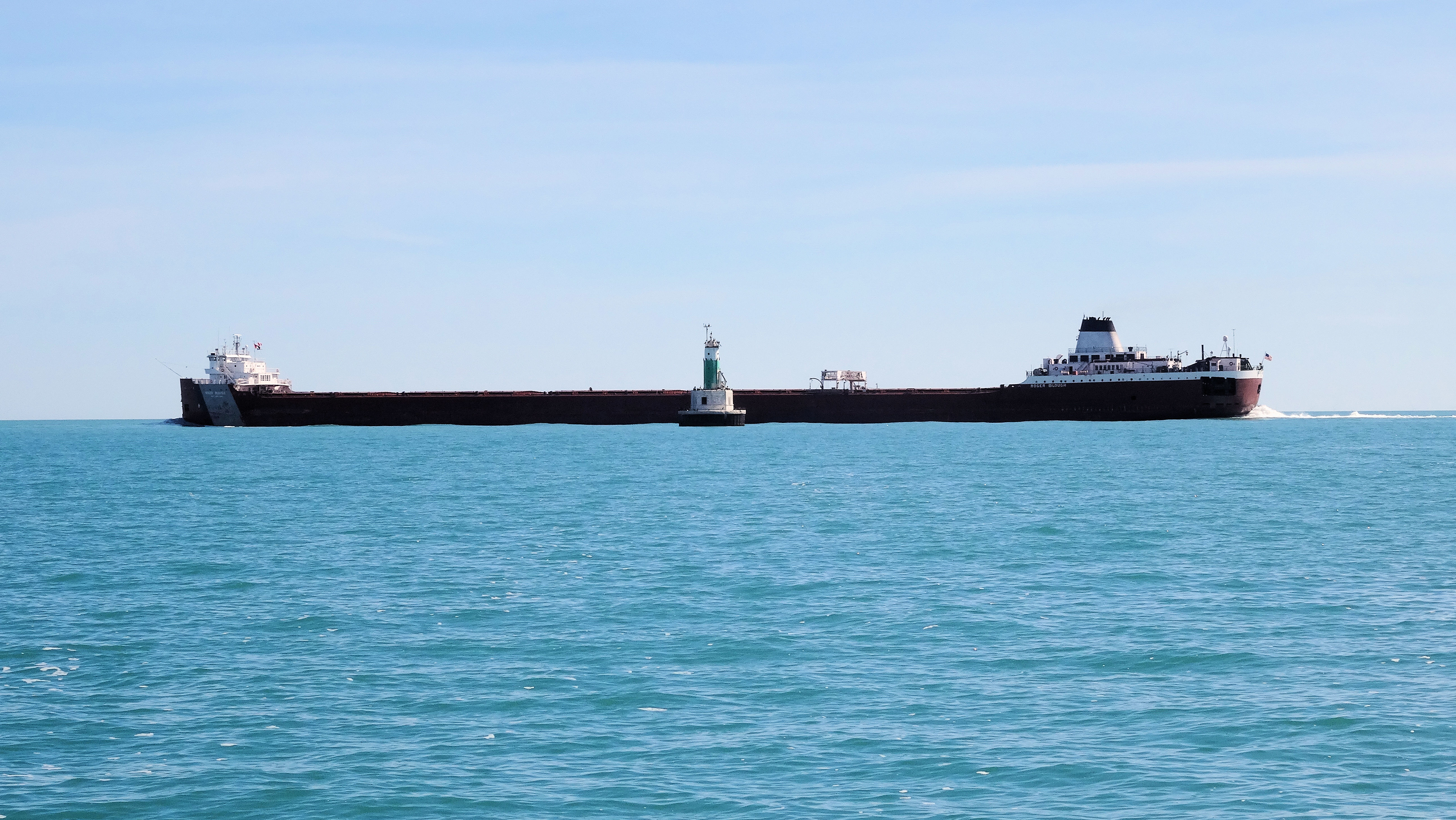
The Roger Blough heading north at the St. Clair Light.

Roger M. Blough (January 19, 1904 – October 8, 1985) was the chairman of the board and chief executive officer of the United States Steel Corporation for 13½ years, from May 1955 through January 1969. In this position, he is best known for serving as the American steel industry's principal spokesman when the industry clashed in April 1962 with President John F. Kennedy on the issue of commodity steel prices.

== Early life and education ==
Blough grew up in Hawley, Pennsylvania. He earned a Bachelor of Arts (BA) degree at Susquehanna University. Following college he was basketball coach and math teacher.

Blough attended Susquehanna University and was a member of Phi Mu Delta fraternity.

== U.S. Steel ==
When Time magazine featured Blough in July 1959, they drew attention to the challenges facing the steel industry in the late 1950s, including inflation and competition from non-U.S. steel exporters. He served as Chairman of The Business Council in 1961 and 1962.

As a consequence of this inflation, Blough told the White House in April 1962 that it was the intent of the U.S. steel industry to raise a basket of steel prices by a scale averaging $6.00/ton. President Kennedy believed that this price increase violated an unwritten agreement that he had brokered between the industry and the United Steel Workers union, and called a press conference in response, held on April 11, 1962. In nationally televised remarks, the President described Blough as one of: “a tiny handful of steel executives whose pursuit of private power and profit exceeds their sense of public responsibility... Some time ago I asked each American to consider what he would do for his country and I asked the steel companies. In the last 24 hours we had their answer.” Blough and U.S. Steel rolled back the threatened price hike.

Blough stubbornly resisted Kennedy administration efforts to enlist Alabama businesses to support desegregation of the University of Alabama, which race-baiting Gov. George Wallace had promised to block by standing in the schoolhouse door. Although the firm employed more than 30,000 workers in Birmingham, Ala., company president Blough in 1963 "went out of his way to announce that any attempt to use his company position in Birmingham to pressure local whites was 'repugnant to me personally' and 'repugnant to my fellow officers at U.S. Steel.'"

== Later career ==
In 1969, at the age of 65, Blough retired from U.S. Steel. That same year he re-joined White & Case as a partner and founded the Construction Users Anti-Inflation Roundtable, "affectionately known" as "Roger's Roundtable."

Having lost his effort to raise prices at U.S. Steel during an inflationary period in the early 1960s, he "made it his personal mission to tame the construction unions through (the Roundtable)," effectively blaming inflation on workers' wages. In 1971, he told Congress that wages were "the No. 1 domestic problem of the country."

In 1972, Roger's Roundtable group merged with March Group and the Labor Law Study Group (LLSG) to form Business Roundtable.

== Death ==
Blough died at his home in Hawley on October 8, 1985. He was 81.

== Personal ==
Blough was married to Helen Decker Blough. The couple had two daughters, Jane French and Judith B. Wentz, and six grandchildren. While at U.S. Steel, he often started his day at 4 or 5 a.m. and rarely ended the before 7 or 8pm.

Bough maintained a residence in the Mellon-U.S. Steel Building in Pittsburgh, PA as well as an apartment on Park Avenue in Manhattan. He spent much of his free time in a large Victorian Home in Hawley, PA that had been passed down through his wife's family.

In December 1965, Blough purchased a plot of land in town of Hawley and gifted the funds needed to create a new building for the Hawley Public Library. The building, named after Blough's wife, was dedicated on October 30, 1966.

== Legacy ==
MV Roger Blough, an iron ore bulk carrier vessel built for U.S. Steel in 1968-72 and used starting in 1972 in Great Lakes service to transport taconite pellets from Lake Superior to ports on Lake Erie and Lake Michigan, was named in his honor. As of 2018 this vessel remained in service.

== See also ==
- List of people on the cover of Time magazine (1950s) - 20 July 1959

Business positions
Preceded by Benjamin Fairless	Chairman of the Board of U.S. Steel; 1955 – 1969	Succeeded by Edwin H. Gott
