= Marathon Oil =

American petroleum company (1887–2024)

Marathon Oil Corporation

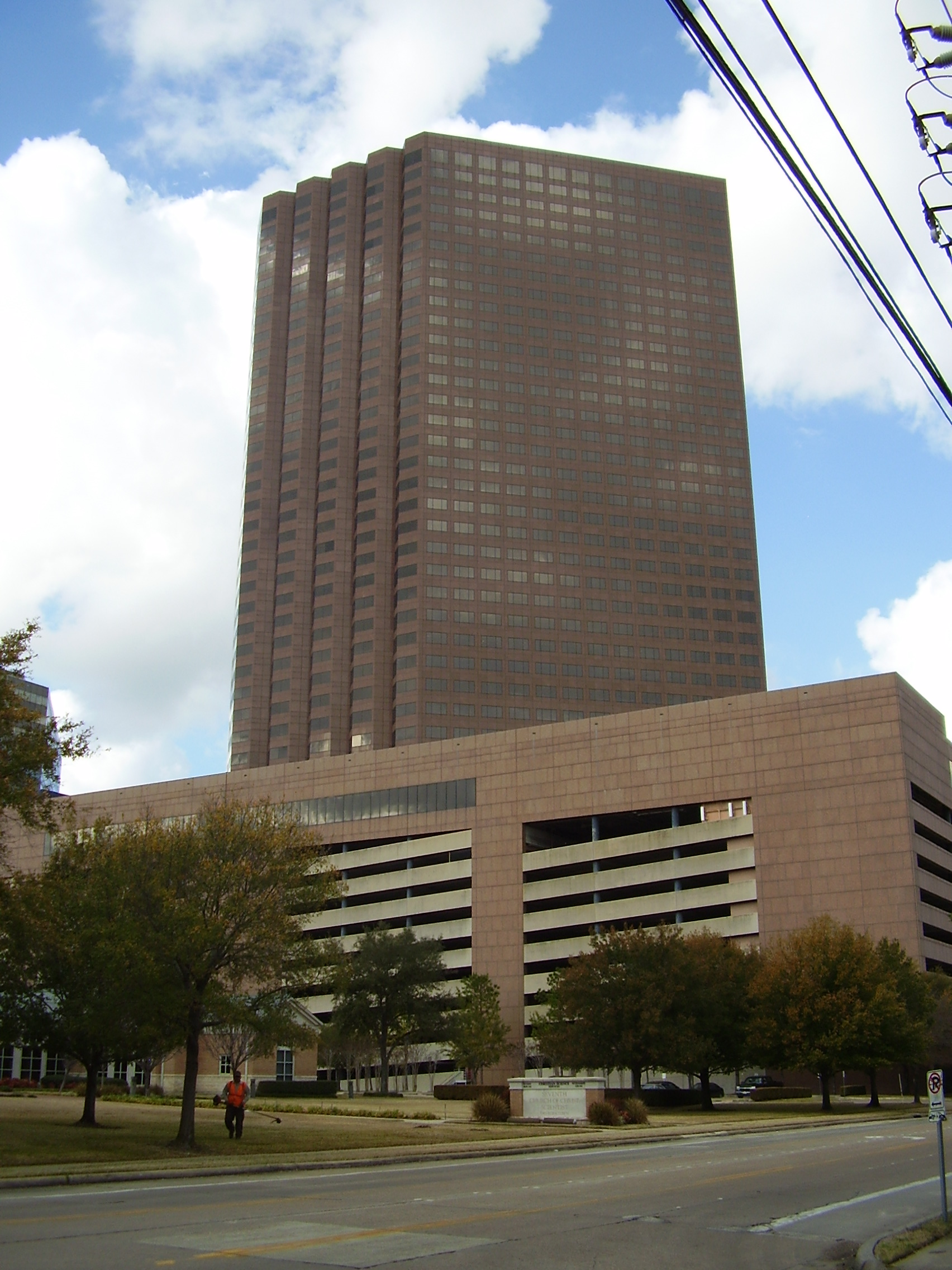
- Marathon Oil Tower, former Marathon Oil Corporation headquarters
- Formerly: The Ohio Oil Company (1887–1962); Marathon Oil Company (1962–2001)
- Traded as: NYSE: MRO
- Industry: Petroleum
- Founded: August 1, 1887; 139 years ago
- Defunct: November 22, 2024
- Fate: Acquired by ConocoPhillips
- Headquarters: Houston, Texas, U.S.
- Revenue: 8,036,000,000 United States dollar (2022)
- Operating income: 3,951,000,000 United States dollar (2022)
- Net income: 3,612,000,000 United States dollar (2022)
- Parent: Standard Oil (1899–1911); USX Corporation (1982–2001)
- Website: marathonoil.com

Marathon Oil Corporation was an American company engaged in hydrocarbon exploration. In November 2024, it was acquired by ConocoPhillips.

Marathon was founded in 1887 in Lima, Ohio, as the Ohio Oil Company. In 1899, the company was acquired by the Standard Oil Company (New Jersey). After the antitrust case against Jersey Standard in 1911 and subsequent breakup of its holdings, Ohio Oil once again became an independent company. In 1930, Ohio Oil acquired the Transcontinental Oil Company, which operated the "Marathon" brand of retail fuel stations. Ohio Oil continued to use the Marathon brand, and in 1962, Ohio changed its name to the Marathon Oil Company.

In January 1982, Marathon was acquired by U.S. Steel. After the acquisition, the USX Corporation was created to act as the parent of U.S. Steel and Marathon Oil, which operated as divisions. In 2001, USX spun off Marathon under the name Marathon Oil Corporation. In 2011, Marathon Oil spun off its downstream operations as Marathon Petroleum.

As of 31 December 2020, the company had 972 million barrels of oil equivalent (5.95×10^{9} GJ) of estimated proven reserves, of which 86% was in the United States and 14% was in Equatorial Guinea. The company's proved reserves consisted 52% of petroleum, 30% natural gas and 18% natural gas liquids. In 2020, the company sold 383 thousand barrels of oil equivalent (2,340,000 GJ) per day, of which 26% was from the Eagle Ford Group, 27% was from the Bakken formation, 17% was from Oklahoma, 7% was from the Northern Delaware Basin, 2% was from other U.S. sources, and 20% was from Equatorial Guinea.

The company ranked as the 58th-largest fossil fuel producer by historical greenhouse gas emissions, having emitted 3,804 MtCO₂e, accounting for 0.19% of total global emissions.

== History ==
Marathon Oil began as "The Ohio Oil Company" in 1887. In 1889, the company was purchased by John D. Rockefeller's Standard Oil. It remained a part of Standard Oil until Standard Oil was broken up in 1911. In 1930, The Ohio Oil Company bought the Transcontinental Oil Company, including the "Marathon" brand name. In 1962, the company changed its name to "Marathon Oil Company".

Ohio Oil finished an 8-inch pipe line from their Martinsville pump station to Wood River on December 21, 1907, work on the refinery at Wood River was underway.

In response to a 1914 Supreme Court decision declaring oil pipelines common carriers under the Hepburn Act and subject to the supervision of the Interstate Commerce Commission, in January 1915 the pipeline assets of the company in Pennsylvania (valued at $250,000), Ohio ($6,377,700), Indiana ($5,357,100) and Illinois ($7,815,200) were spun off (Note: Pursuant to a shareholder vote on Dec 21, 1914 Ohio Oil Co received in exchange for its pipe line assets the entire outstanding issue of 200,000 shares of Illinois Pipe Line Co. (par $100), which was then distributed as a stock dividend among holders of the 600,000 shares (par $25) of the Ohio Oil Co., who received 1/3 share of Illinois Pipe Line Co. for each share of Ohio Oil Co. held) into the Illinois Pipe Line Company (incorporated November 30, 1914 in Ohio). The segregation was reversed in March 1930 when Ohio Oil bought back (Note: Ohio Oil Co. offered the entire outstanding issue of 600,000 shares of its new 6% preferred (par $100) in exchange for the 200,000 (par $100) shares of Illinois Pipe Line Co.) Illinois Pipe Line Co. The pipe line ran from Wood River, Illinois to the Pennsylvania-New Jersey border at Centerbridge where it connected to Standard Oil's pipeline system and the Bayonne refinery. The line also reached the Lima, Ohio plant of the Solar Refining Company. Maps: 1931

The company sponsored an aerial demonstration team called the "Linco Flying Aces" in the 1930s.

In 1959, the Ohio Oil Company acquired Detroit based Aurora Oil Company which operated Speedway 79 stations and became an Ohio Oil subsidiary.

In 1962, the Speedway 79 and Marathon fuel stations were consolidated under the Marathon name and the Ohio Oil Company is renamed Marathon Oil Company.

In 1981, Mobil made a hostile takeover offer to buy the company. However, the board of Marathon Oil rejected the offer and instead sold the company to United States Steel. A legal battle ensued thereafter.

In 1984, Marathon purchased the U.S. unit of Husky Energy for $505 million.

In 1990, the headquarters was moved to Houston, Texas, but the company's refining subsidiary maintained its headquarters in Findlay, Ohio.

In 1993, the company sold Findlay Airport to the City of Findlay.

In 1998, Marathon and Ashland Global contributed their refining operations to Marathon Ashland Petroleum LLC (MAP), now Marathon Petroleum.

In 2001, USX, the holding company that owned United States Steel and Marathon, spun off the steel business and, in 2002, USX renamed itself Marathon Oil Corporation.

In 2003, Marathon sold its Canadian operations to Husky Energy.

In 2003, the company sold its interest in the Yates Oil Field to Kinder Morgan for $225 million.

In 2007, Marathon acquired Western Oil Sands for $6.6 billion and gained ownership of its 20% stake in the Athabasca oil sands in northern Alberta, Canada and other assets in the midwestern United States.

In 2009, an investigation of the company by the United States Securities and Exchange Commission for payments made to Teodoro Obiang Nguema Mbasogo, the president of Equatorial Guinea was completed; no action was recommended.

In 2011, Marathon completed the corporate spin-off of Marathon Petroleum, distributing a 100% interest to its shareholders.

In June 2013, Marathon sold its Angolan oil and gas field to Sinopec for $1.52 billion.

In September 2013, Marathon sold a 10% stake in an oil and gas field offshore Angola for $590 million to Sonangol Group.

In October 2014, the company sold its business in Norway to Det Norske Oljeselskap ASA for $2.1 billion.

In 2017, it sold its interests in the Athabasca oil sands for $2.5 billion and acquired assets in the Permian Basin for $1.2 billion.

In March 2018, it sold its assets in Libya for $450 million to TotalEnergies SE.

In December 2022, the company acquired assets in the Eagle Ford from Ensign Natural Resources for $3.0 billion in cash.

In July 2024, Marathon agreed to a $241.5 million settlement with the US Department of Justice and the Environmental Protection Agency to resolve allegations of failing to obtain required permits at dozens of the company's oil and gas facilities on the Fort Berthold Indian Reservation in North Dakota and releasing thousands of tons of illegal air pollution as a result. The settlement included Marathon denying liability for the allegations but agreeing to pay a $64.5 million civil penalty, the largest fine ever imposed for violations of the Clean Air Act from stationary sources, as well as agreeing to invest $177 million to bring its facilities into compliance.

In November 2024, ConocoPhillips acquired the company in a $22.5 billion transaction.

== Leadership ==
=== President ===
1. Henry M. Ernst, 1887–1889
2. William P. Fleming, 1889–1892
3. John Dustin Archbold, 1892–1911
4. James C. Donnell, 1911–1927
5. Otto D. Donnell, 1927–1948
6. James C. Donnell, II, 1948–1972
7. Harold D. Hoopman, 1972–1985
8. William E. Swales, 1985–1987
9. Victor G. Beghini, 1987–1999
10. Clarence P. Cazalot, Jr., 2000–2013
11. Lee M. Tillman, 2013–2024

=== Chairman of the Board ===
1. James C. Donnell, II, 1972–1975
2. Thomas J. Usher, 2001–2011
3. Clarence P. Cazalot, Jr., 2011–2013
4. Dennis H. Reilley, 2013–2019
5. Lee M. Tillman, 2019–2024
