= Figueiredo =

Figueiredo may refer to:

== Places ==
- Figueiredo (Amares), a parish in the Amares municipality in Portugal
- Figueiredo (Braga), a parish in the Braga municipality in Portugal
- Figueiredo (Guimarães), a parish in the Guimarães municipality in Portugal
- Figueiredo River, a river in Ceará state, Brazil
- Abel Figueiredo, a municipality in Pará state, Brazil
- Pedro Otacílio Figueiredo Airport, an airport near Vitória da Conquista, Brazil
- Presidente Figueiredo, a municipality in Amazonas state, Brazil

== People with the surname ==
- Figueiredo (footballer, born 1960), Cláudio Figueiredo Diz, Brazilian footballer
- Figueiredo (footballer, born 2001), Lucas Figueiredo dos Santos, Brazilian footballer
- Figueiredo Sobral (1926–2010), Portuguese painter, sculptor and poet
- Afonso Figueiredo (born 1993), Portuguese footballer
- Afonso Celso de Assis Figueiredo Júnior (1860–1938), Brazilian historian, politician and academic
- Ana Figueiredo (born 1974), Portuguese businesswoman
- António Figueiredo Lopes (born 1936), Portuguese politician and lawyer
- António Fortunato de Figueiredo (1903–1981), Goan and Indian conductor and musician
- António Osório Sarmento de Figueiredo Jr. (1855–1935), Portuguese nobleman, politician and magistrate
- Bernardo de Sá Nogueira de Figueiredo (1795–1876), Portuguese nobleman and politician
- Bruno Figueiredo (born 1999), Portuguese footballer
- Cândido de Figueiredo (1846–1925), Portuguese lawyer, civil servant and writer
- Cristóvão de Figueiredo (died c. 1540), Portuguese painter
- Dalva Figueiredo, Brazilian politician
- Dayse Figueiredo (born 1984), Brazilian volleyball player
- Deiveson Figueiredo (born 1987), Brazilian mixed martial artist
- Diego Figueiredo (born 1980), Brazilian musician
- Djairo Guedes de Figueiredo (born 1934), Brazilian mathematician and academic
- Dudu Figueiredo (born 1991), Brazilian footballer
- Dulce Figueiredo (1923–2011), First Lady of Brazil and wife of João Figueiredo
- Elísio de Figueiredo, Angolan politician and diplomat
- Elton Figueiredo (born 1986), Brazilian footballer
- Ernesto Figueiredo (1937–2025), Portuguese footballer
- Estevão Brioso de Figueiredo (1630–1689), Portuguese Roman Catholic cleric
- Esther Figueiredo Ferraz (1916–2008), Brazilian lawyer and politician
- Fabian Figueiredo (born 1989), Portuguese politician and sociologist
- Fidelino de Figueiredo (1889–1967), Portuguese writer, journalist and academic
- Francisco Figueiredo (born 1989), Brazilian mixed martial artist
- Frederico Figueiredo (born 1991), Portuguese cyclist
- Germano de Figueiredo (1932–2004), Portuguese footballer
- Guilherme Figueiredo (1915–1997), Brazilian playwright
- Igor Figueiredo (born 1972), Brazilian snooker player
- Ilda Figueiredo (born 1948), Portuguese politician
- Isabela Figueiredo (born 1963), Portuguese writer, teacher and journalist
- Ivo de Figueiredo (born 1966), Norwegian historian, biographer and literary critic
- Jackson de Figueiredo (1891–1928), Brazilian lawyer, intellectual and journalist
- Jane Figueiredo (born 1963), Zimbabwean diving coach
- João Figueiredo (1918–1999), Brazilian military general and politician
- João Figueiredo (footballer) (born 1996), Brazilian footballer
- João Cotrim de Figueiredo (born 1961), Portuguese businessman and politician
- Kevin Figueiredo (born 1977), American musician
- Lucio Figueirêdo (1927–2003), Brazilian water polo player
- Luís de Figueiredo e Lemos (1544–1608), Portuguese Roman Catholic cleric
- Luiz Alberto Figueiredo (born 1955), Brazilian politician and diplomat
- Maria Magnólia Figueiredo (born 1963), Brazilian sprinter
- Maximira Figueiredo (1939–2018), Brazilian actress
- Miguel Figueiredo (born 2008), Portuguese footballer
- Millene Figueiredo (born 1983), Brazilian handball player
- Natasha Rosa Figueiredo (born 1996), Brazilian weightlifter
- Nicolau de Figueiredo (1960–2016), Brazilian musician and conductor
- Nonô Figueiredo (born 1971), Brazilian racing driver
- Paulo Figueiredo (born 1972), Angolan footballer
- Pedro Figueiredo (born 1991), Portuguese golfer
- Pedro Paulo de Figueiredo da Cunha e Melo (1770–1855), Portuguese Roman Catholic cleric and Cardinal
- Raúl Figueiredo (born 1930), Portuguese footballer
- Roberto de Figueiredo Caldas (born 1962), Brazilian lawyer and judge
- Rodrigo Figueiredo (born 1996), Brazilian footballer
- Rui Figueiredo (born 1983), Portuguese footballer
- Rui de Figueiredo (1929–2013), Goan and Indian electrical engineer, mathematician and academic
- Rui Alberto de Figueiredo Soares (born 1956), Cape Verdean politician
- Tatiana Figueiredo (born 1968), Brazilian gymnast
- Tobias Figueiredo (born 1994), Portuguese footballer
- Tomé Barbosa de Figueiredo Almeida Cardoso (died 1820 or 1822), Portuguese writer, etymologist and polyglot
- Wílton Figueiredo (born 1982), Brazilian footballer

== Other ==
- Figueiredo Report, a 1967 report into crimes committed by the Brazilian Indigenous Protection Service
