= Figueredo =

Figueredo is a Galician and Portuguese surname. It is a toponymic surname derived from the multiple places called Figueiredo in Galicia, and it means "grove of fig trees".

Notable people with the surname include:

- Aurelio José Figueredo (born 1955), American evolutionary psychologist
- Diego Figueredo (born 1982), Paraguayan football player
- Eugenio Figueredo (born 1932), Uruguayan association football executive
- Fernando Figueredo, a Florida politician
- Ignacio Figueredo (1899–1995), Venezuelan folk musician
- Jorge Figueredo, Cuban-American executive
- Julia Figueredo (born 1966), Bolivian politician
- Leonel Figueredo Losada (born 1988), Mexican chess master
- Perucho Figueredo (1818–1870), author of the Cuban national anthem
- Zenón Figueredo (1855–1899), General in Thousand Days' War

== See also ==
- Figueiredo
