= Paulo Neves =

Portuguese executive, CEO of Portugal Telecom (born 1961)

- Born: 24 March 1961 (age 65)
- Occupation: CEO of Portugal Telecom

Paulo Manuel da Conceição Neves (born 24 March 1961) is a Portuguese executive, current CEO of Portugal Telecom. Paulo Neves holds a degree in electronic engineering from Instituto Superior Técnico of Lisbon (1984) and a graduate degree in telecommunications enterprise management by Instituto Superior de Transportes/ Instituto de Empresa of Madrid (1988).

== Career ==
Paulo Neves was appointed as CEO of Portugal Telecom in July 2015, by the Altice Group. Prior to joining PT, he held the position of President of the Directing Council of AMA (Agência para a Modernização Administrativa). Earlier, he spet 13 years at Oni Group, where he worked in the areas of Regulation and Business Development, Operational Planning, Marketing and Business Internet.

Neves began his career at CTT from 1985 until 1989. Between 1989 and 1998 he held several management positions at Ericsson, in Technical Support, Marketing and Sales, Transversal Management Enterprise Business Unit and Strategic Development, having also been a member of the Executive Management Team.
