= PGW =

PGW may refer to:

- Painted Grey Ware culture (1100 BC to 350 BC), an Iron Age archaeological culture of ancient India
- Philadelphia Gas Works, a natural gas utility owned by and serving Philadelphia, Pennsylvania, U. S.
- PDN Gateway, a gateway used in LTE/4G networks
- Publishers Group West, a book distributor based in Berkeley, California
- Paris Games Week, an annual trade fair for video games held in Paris, France
- Persian Gulf War
