= Telepac =

Telepac is the Portuguese internet service brand of the Portugal Telecom group.

== Use ==
The Telepac brand dates from the time when Portugal Telecom didn't yet exist. It was used beginning in 1985 by Telefones de Lisboa e Porto (TLP) and Correios, Telefones e Telégrafos (CTT) for its Videotex services. It was the property of Transdata, a joint venture between CTT and TLP.

In 1992, a merger with CTT created Telecom Portugal, which didn't modify the videotex management. In 1995 they started to offer internet services.

In 1999, they became the ISP of SAPO.
