= Mario Longhi =

Brazilian American businessman

Mario Longhi Filho
- Born: 1956 (age 69–70); Tatuí, Brazil
- Education: Instituto Mauá de Tecnologia (B.S., 1977; M.S)
- Occupation: Businessman
- Known for: Former CEO of U.S. Steel

Mario Longhi Filho (born 1956) is a Brazilian American businessman, mostly notably the former CEO of U.S. Steel. He is currently a member of the board of directors of UGI Corporation.

== Biography ==
=== Early life and education ===
Longhi was born in Tatuí, Brazil. He is the son of Italian immigrants. He obtained an undergraduate degree in 1977 in metallurgical engineering from Instituto Mauá de Tecnologia. In 1978, he worked for Cobrasma, a Babcock & Wilcox licensee involved in pressure vessels in South America. He then obtained a master's degree in metallurgical engineering from Instituto Mauá de Tecnologia.

=== Career ===
After graduating, beginning in 1982, Longhi worked for Alcoa for 23 years, where he was first a construction superintendent for a refinery in Brazil, moving up to Group President Global Extrusions and End Products, a Vice President of Alcoa, and a member of Alcoa's Executive Council. In 2002, he became President and COO of Howmet Castings.

From 2006 to 2011, Longhi was the CEO of the North American division of Gerdau.

In July 2012, he became chief operating officer of U.S. Steel. He was promoted to president in June 2023 and then was promoted to CEO in September 2013 after the retirement of John P. Surma. He implemented a transformation plan at the company. He retired in June 2017 and was succeeded by David Burritt.

In April 2020, he became a member of the board of directors of UGI Corporation. He served as Interim President and Chief Executive Officer of UGI Corporation from December 2023 to October 2024.

== Awards ==
- 2015 - Platts - CEO of the Year
- 2015 - Association for Iron and Steel Technology - Steelmaker of the Year

== Personal life ==
Longhi is married to Maria Helena Longhi. In December 2019, Longhi sold his apartment in Pittsburgh for $2.2 million. In October 2019, he paid $6.5 million for a 10-bedroom mansion in Pinecrest, Florida. He sold it for $9.8 million in May 2021. He also owns a residence on Fisher Island, Florida.
