= Covilhã Data Center =

Data center in Portugal

The Covilhã Data Center is one of the largest data centers in the world and the largest in Portugal. It is owned by Altice Portugal.

== See also ==
- Altice
- Altice Portugal
