= SAPO (company) =

Portuguese portal

Logo since 2025

The Servidor de Apontadores Portugueses Online (SAPO; Portuguese for 'Portuguese Online Pointers Server') is a Portuguese portal and provider of products and services for the Internet. Founded in 1995 as a search engine, it is the largest internet portal in Portugal. The current SAPO logo was launched in 2025.

SAPO is an information hub and receives over 61 million visits per month. Currently, SAPO is produced by MEO – Serviços de Comunicações e Multimédia.

== History ==
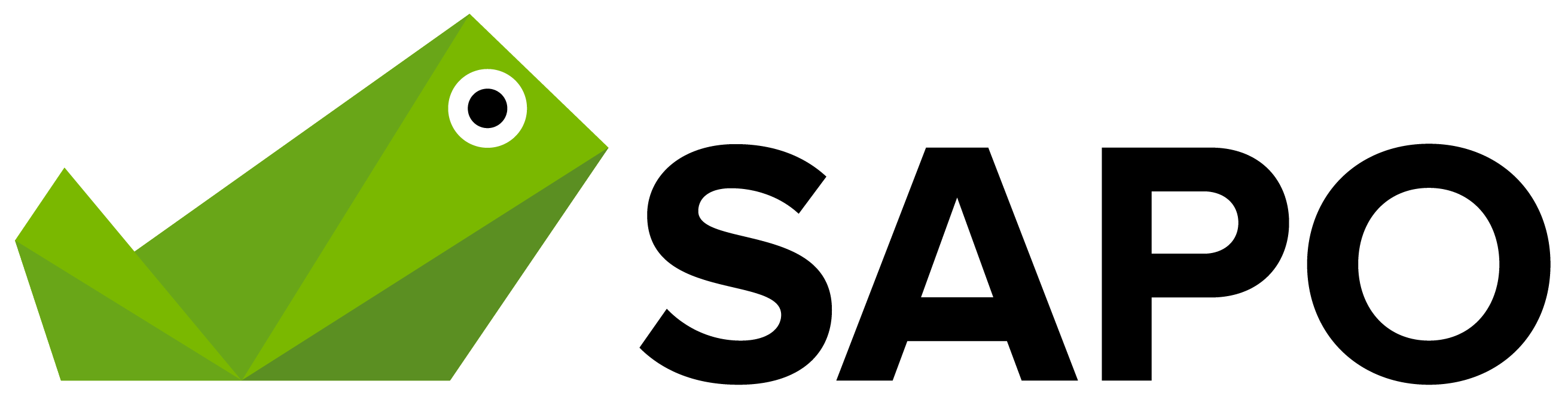
Logo used between 2014–2025

SAPO was created on September 4, 1995, at the University of Aveiro by six students in the Center for Informatics of the university. The name originated from the acronym of the service, S.A.P. (Servidor de Apontadores Portugueses), which later evolved into Servidor de Apontadores Portugueses Online, giving rise to the acronym SAPO. Another factor in the name was Sapo Cocas, which is the European Portuguese name of Kermit the Frog.

In 1997, SAPO became the property of the company Navegante and began commercial operation. At some point, it became part of Altice Portugal.

== Discontinued services ==
=== SAPO Fotos ===
SAPO Fotos was an online photo hosting, management, and sharing service launched by SAPO in 2005. It reached approximately 200,000 users and 16 million images. Among other associated projects, it had partnerships with Agência Lusa, which made their photographic archive available on SAPO Fotos, and SAPO Panoramas, which featured the best 360-degree photographs taken in Portugal. The service was discontinued in 2017.

=== SAPO International ===
SAPO expanded internationally in 2008 by opening localized portals in Angola and Cabo Verde, followed by Moçambique and Timor-Leste in 2010. These portals featured local content in partnership with local media outlets. In 2020, the service was shut down by Altice, the company that owns SAPO.

=== PTM.COM ===
In August 1999, PT Multimédia acquired 74.9% on SAPO and UOL and Zipnet in the Brazil. In May 2000, the company became 100% owned by PTM.com, PTM first portal..In October 2007, PT Portugal's spin-off with PT Multimédia in 2007, when it was incorporated into PTC (now MEO). Currently since 2008, the portal is not part.
