= David Burritt =

American businessman (born 1954/55)

- Born: David Boyd Burritt; 1954 or 1955 (age 71–72); St. Louis, Missouri, US
- Education: Bradley University; University of Illinois at Urbana–Champaign
- Occupation: Businessman
- Title: CEO, U.S. Steel
- Term: May 2017-
- Predecessor: Mario Longhi
- Board member of: Lockheed Martin (since 2008); National Safety Council
- Spouse: Lynn Burritt

David Boyd Burritt (born c. 1955) is an American businessman who is the CEO of U.S. Steel. Prior to joining U.S. Steel, Burritt spent over three decades at Caterpillar Inc. As head of U.S. Steel, Burritt has overseen the reopening of the Granite City Works steel mill and the acquisition of Big River Steel.

== Early life ==
Burritt was born in St. Louis, Missouri. Burritt earned a bachelor's degree in accounting in 1977 from Bradley University and a Master of Business Administration from the University of Illinois at Urbana–Champaign in 1990.

== Career ==
Burritt worked for Caterpillar Inc. for 32 years before joining U.S. Steel in 2013. Burritt joined the company as executive vice president and chief financial officer. In February 2017, he became president and chief operating officer. Later the same year, Burritt succeeded Mario Longhi as President & Chief Executive Officer. During his tenure as chief executive officer, Burritt oversaw the reopening of the Granite City Works steel mill, acquisition of Big River Steel, and the Acquisition of U.S. Steel by Nippon Steel.

Burritt led the deal announced in December 2023 to sell the company to Japan-based Nippon Steel after rejecting a competing bid from U.S.-based Cleveland Cliffs that proposed $35 per share to U.S. Steel shareholders. The deal closed in June 2025.

== Board memberships ==
Burritt is a board member of Lockheed Martin, the National Safety Council, and is an executive committee member of the World Steel Association. Burritt is also a member of The Business Council.

== Personal life ==
Burritt is married to Lynn.
