= UGI Corporation =

American natural gas and electric power distribution company

- Formerly: United Gas Improvement Co.
- Type: Public company
- Traded as: NYSE: UGI; S&P 400 component
- Industry: Energy industry
- Founded: 1882; 144 years ago
- Headquarters: King of Prussia, Pennsylvania, U.S.
- Area served: United States; Europe
- Key people: Mario Longhi, Chairperson; Bob Flexon, CEO; Sean O'Brien, CFO
- Revenue: ▲$7.651 billion (2018)
- Net income: ▲$0.718 billion (2018)
- Total assets: ▲$11.980 billion (2018)
- Total equity: ▲$3.681 billion (2018)
- Number of employees: 7,700 (2018)
- Subsidiaries: UGI Utilties; UGI Energy Services; Mountaineer Gas Co. AmeriGas; UGI International
- Website: www.ugicorp.com

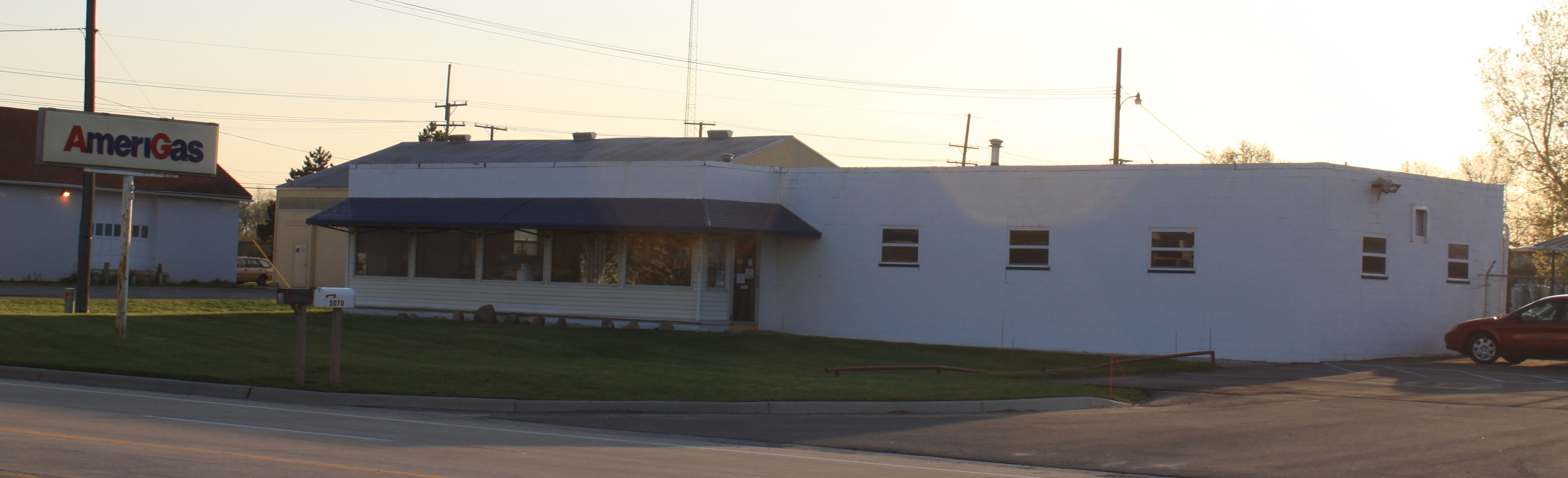
AmeriGas, Ypsilanti, MI

UGI Corporation (formerly United Gas Improvement Corp.) is a natural gas and electric power distribution company headquartered in King of Prussia, Pennsylvania, with extensive operations in the United States and Europe.

UGI owns AmeriGas, the largest propane marketer in the United States. UGI also owns AvantiGas, Antargaz and Flaga in Europe.

UGI also operates interstate and intrastate transmission and natural gas storage assets in the Marcellus Shale.

== History ==
UGI was incorporated in 1882 as United Gas Improvement Co.

In 1903, the company owned the majority of the stock of the Equitable Illuminating Gas Light Company, which operated the Philadelphia Gas Works.

The company formed the United Electric Company of New Jersey in 1899. United Electric consolidated several electric and lighting utilities into a single holding company.

Public Service Corporation of New Jersey took over United Electric in 1907. United Electric was ultimately merged into Public Service Enterprise Group.

In October 1964, Industrial Gases, Inc., of Pittsburgh, Pennsylvania, filed an antitrust suit in United States district court charging the company with attempting to eliminate competition in sales of bottled propane gas in Pittsburgh. The Philadelphia Gas Works division of UGI challenged a ruling of the Federal Power Commission. The FPC lowered the maximum price that natural gas producers could charge to $0.16 per 1,000 cubic feet (28 m^{3}) of gas. This mandate was upheld by the Supreme Court of the United States in May 1968.

In February 1968, the company changed its name to UGI Corporation.

In 1993, through its AmeriGas subsidiary, the company acquired Petrolane, which was in bankruptcy.

In 1999, the company offered to acquire Unisource Worldwide, a distributor of office paper, but it was outbid by Georgia-Pacific.

On April 1, 2013, John Walsh succeeded Lon Greenberg as president and chief executive officer.

In May 2015, the company acquired Totalgaz S.A.'s liquefied petroleum gas distribution operations in France for €423 million.

In October 2017, the company acquired Totalgaz Italia, a liquefied petroleum gas distribution business, and renamed it UniverGas Italia.

In December 2018, the company acquired South Jersey Industries’s retail natural gas business.

On August 1, 2019, the company acquired Columbia Midstream Group for approximately $1.275 billion.

On August 21, 2019, the company acquired the portion of AmeriGas that it did not already own.

On July 10, 2020, the company acquired GHI Energy LLC, a Houston-based renewable natural gas company.

On January 5, 2020, the company acquired Mountaineer Gas Company of West Virginia for $540 million.

== Notable people ==
- A. O. Granger, UGI president c. 1886
