= São Caetano do Sul =

- Municipality
- Município de São Caetano do Sul; Municipality of São Caetano do Sul
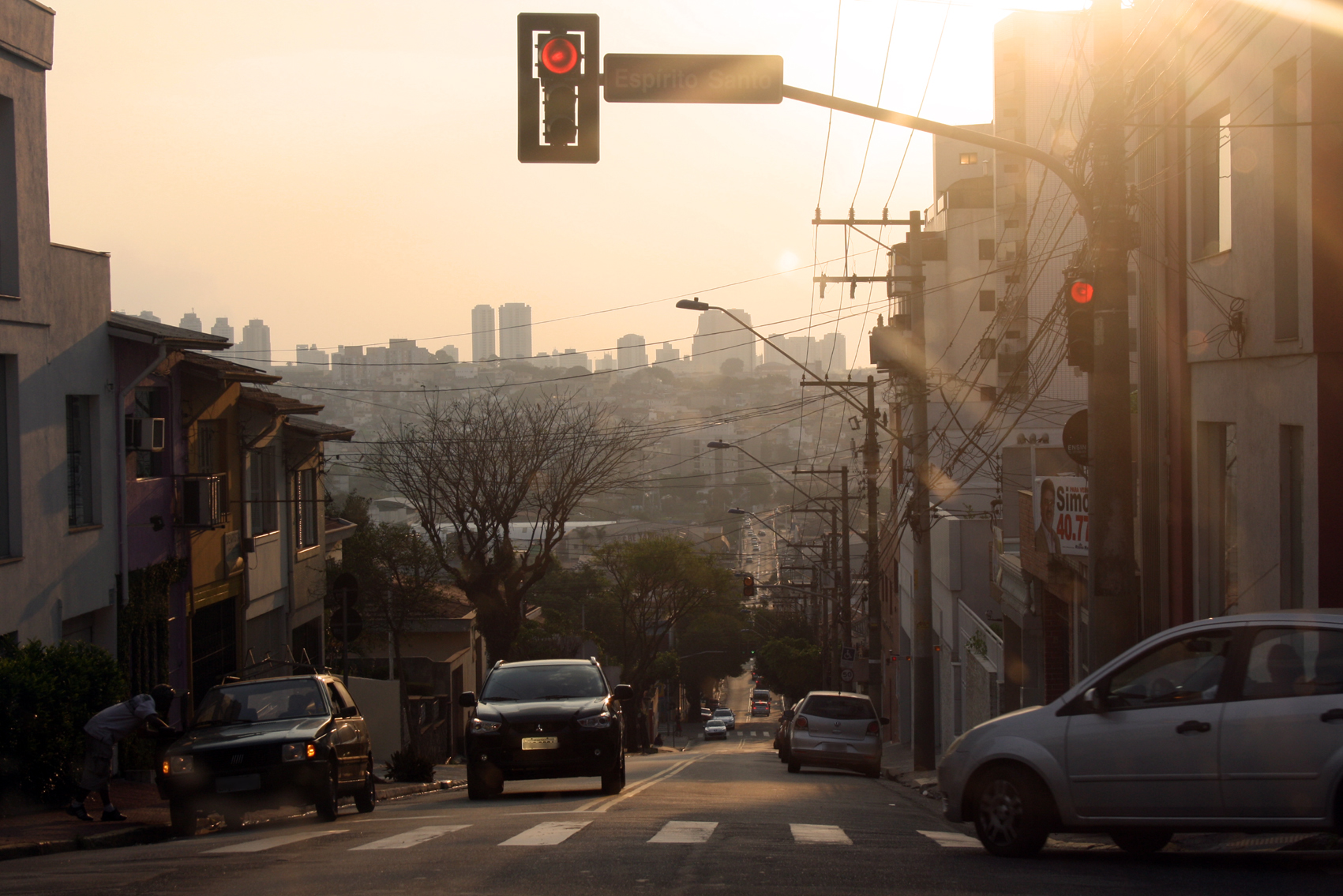
- Downtown São Caetano do Sul

- Flag Coat of arms

- Location in Brazil
- Coordinates: 23°37′23″S 46°33′4″W
- Country: Brazil
- Region: Southeast Brazil
- State: São Paulo
- Established: 28 July 1877
- Named for: Saint Cajetan

Government
  - Mayor: Anacleto Campanella Jr

Area
  - Total: 15.33 km^{2} (5.92 sq mi)
- Elevation: 744 m (2,441 ft)

Population (2022 Census)
  - Total: 165,655
  - Estimate (2025): 172,693
  - Density: 10,810/km^{2} (27,990/sq mi)
- Time zone: UTC-3 (BRT)
  - Summer (DST): UTC-2 (BRST)
- HDI (2010): 0.862 – very high
- Website: São Caetano do Sul

São Caetano do Sul (Brazilian Portuguese: [sɐ̃w kajˈtɐnu du ˈsuw]; "Saint Cajetan of the South"), or simply São Caetano, is a city in São Paulo state in Brazil. It is part of the Metropolitan Region of São Paulo. The population is 165,655 (2022 Census) in an area of 15.33 km^{2}. It is the city with the highest per capita income in Brazil (US$31,322.00 in 2010)

It is intensely conurbated with São Paulo, Santo André and São Bernardo do Campo, causing the physical limits between cities to be lost. São Caetano do Sul, together with Ferraz de Vasconcelos, is one of two cities in the state of São Paulo that are not crossed by any state or federal highway.

== History ==
Historical affiliations

Empire of Brazil 1877–1889
Republic of Brazil 1889–present

The region in which the municipality of São Caetano do Sul is today is occupied since the 16th century when it was known as Tijucuçu. It was an area of estates of residents of the former settlement, later villa (1553), of Santo André da Borda do Campo, extinguished by order of the governor-general Mem de Sá.

In the seventeenth century a group of Benedictine monks formed in the region, donated by a farmer, the Monastery of Saint Benedict and the Tijucuçu Farm, used by the monks to raise cattle. In 1717, the monks began to erect the chapel dedicated to Saint Cajetan di Thiène (In Portuguese, São Caetano), the patron saint of bread and work, in the place where the Old Matrix of St. Caetano is today. They passed the farm to be called Farm of São Caetano do Tijucuçu, then São Caetano Farm. Around the farm was developed the district of São Caetano, in the same territory of the city of São Paulo. It was first enumerated in 1765, when the Morgado de Mateus determined that a census of the population of the Captaincy of São Paulo was made. Its inhabitants were farmers and tropeiros and they received the sacraments in the Chapel of São Caetano.

In 1871, on the day after the Free Womb Law, the Order of Saint Benedict decided, in its General Chapter of Bahia, to free all of its slaves, in Brazil, more than four thousand, without any compensation. Deprived of labor, Farm São Caetano was expropriated by the Imperial Government to install the Colonial Nucleus of São Caetano on 28 July 1877. The lands of the farm were divided into lots and sold to Italian settlers between 1877 and 1892, when the last family of immigrants entered the Nucleus. The first group of families settled in the nucleus had embarked in the port of Genoa and arrived in Brazil on the Italian ship Europa. All the families were from the commune of Cappella Maggiore and its surroundings, in the province of Treviso, in the region of Veneto, northern Italy.

In 1883 the São Paulo Railway inaugurated the station of São Caetano and in 1889 the government of the province reformed the Way of the Sea and the Old Way of Santo André da Borda do Campo, that from 16th century crossed the region, the tributary of the railway.

Shortly before the Republican coup d'état was created the municipality of São Bernardo, dismembered of the one of São Paulo, and the greater part of the Colonial Nucleus and of the old district of São Caetano was attached to it.

In 1905, São Caetano was elevated to Fiscal District. In 1924 the village became a districty.

Map of the state of São Paulo (1948).

In 1947, in a movement led by the Jornal de São Caetano, a list of 5,197 signatures was made and sent to the State Legislative Assembly, requesting a plebiscite. The popular consultation was held on 24 October 1948; 8,463 people voted in favor of autonomy, and 1,020 voted against. On 24 December 1948, the governor of the state of São Paulo, Ademar de Barros, ratified the decision and created the "municipality of São Caetano do Sul", through State Law n. 233, dated 12/24/1948, adding the qualifier of the South, to distinguish it from Pernambuco's homonym. On 30 December 1953, the County of São Caetano do Sul was created.

=== 2011 school shooting ===
On 22 September 2011, a school shooting occurred at Alcina Dantas Feijão school in São Caetano do Sul, São Paulo state, Brazil. A 10-year-old student, Davi Mota Nogueira, shot and injured a 38-year-old teacher, Rosileide Queiros de Oliveira, before committing suicide.

== Geography ==
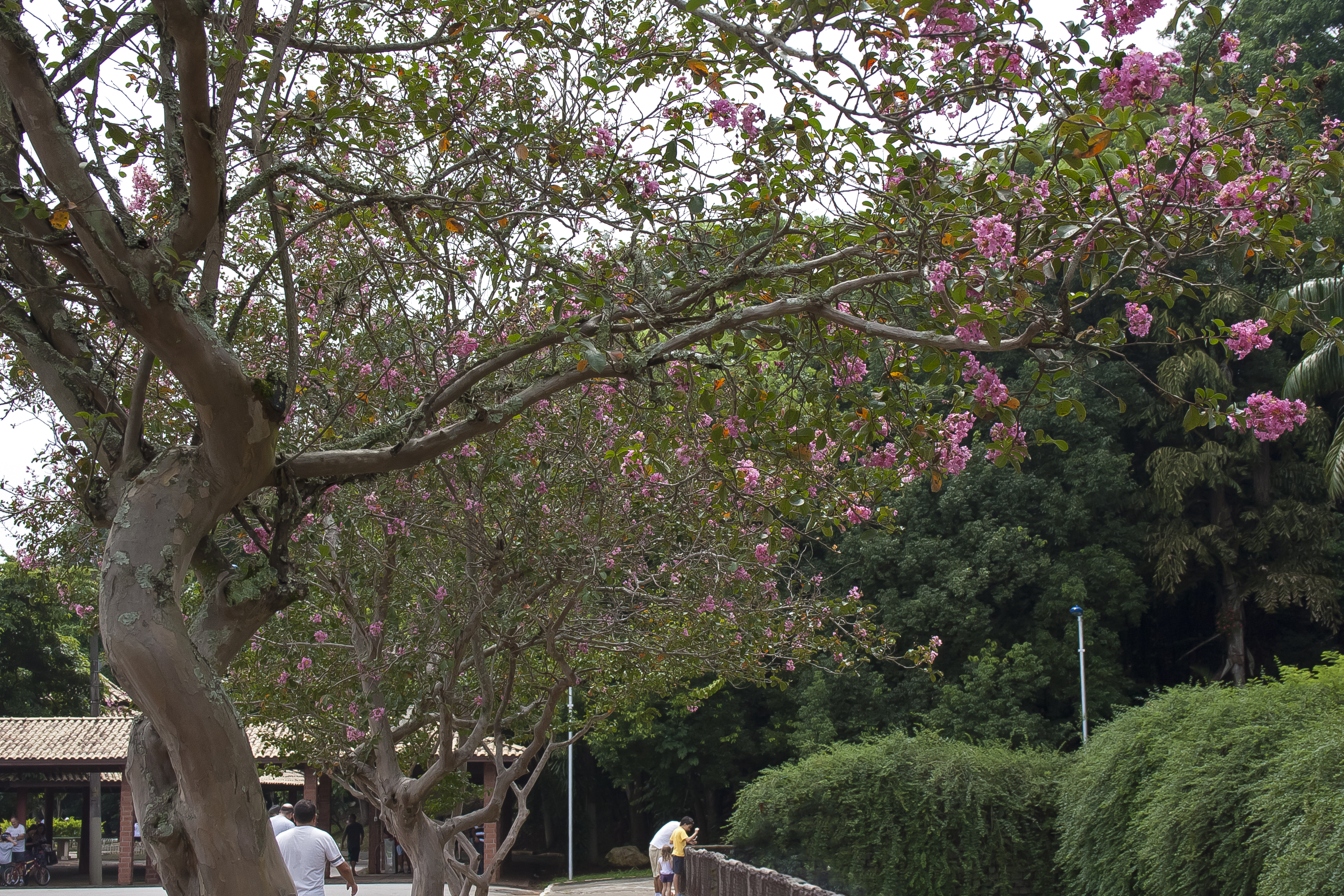
São Caetano's public park

São Caetano do Sul is located on a plateau that is part of the Serra do Mar (Portuguese for "Sea Range"), part of the vast region known as the Brazilian Highlands, with an average elevation of around 800 meters (2,600 ft) above sea level – though at a distance of only about 70 kilometers (43 mi) from the Atlantic Ocean. Neighbouring municipalities are Santo André (East and South), São Bernardo do Campo (West) and São Paulo (North).

São Caetano do Sul is socially well developed and is highly rated in several aspects of the HDI (Human Development Index) of the UN, ranking first in the list of Brazilian municipalities by HDI. Although there are no favelas, the municipality, even with all the development achieved, still has part of its population living precariously, in slums scattered throughout the city.

The literacy rate is high: 99.6%.

Main nationalities of origin of immigrants living in São Caetano: Italian, Spanish, Arabic, African, Japanese, Portuguese, German, Ukrainian, Lithuanian and Hungarian.

=== Climate ===
According to the Köppen climate classification São Caetano do Sul has a humid subtropical climate. Little hot and rainy summer. Winter mild and subservient. The average annual temperature is around 18 °C, the coldest month in July (average of 15 °C) and the warmest in February (average of 21 °C). The annual rainfall index is around 1 360 mm.

Climate data for São Caetano do Sul
| Month | Jan | Feb | Mar | Apr | May | Jun | Jul | Aug | Sep | Oct | Nov | Dec | Year |
|---|---|---|---|---|---|---|---|---|---|---|---|---|---|
| Mean daily maximum °C (°F) | 25.7 (78.3) | 25.7 (78.3) | 24.9 (76.8) | 23.2 (73.8) | 21.3 (70.3) | 20.4 (68.7) | 20.0 (68.0) | 20.9 (69.6) | 21.9 (71.4) | 22.6 (72.7) | 23.8 (74.8) | 24.9 (76.8) | 22.9 (73.2) |
| Mean daily minimum °C (°F) | 16.6 (61.9) | 16.8 (62.2) | 16.0 (60.8) | 14.0 (57.2) | 11.6 (52.9) | 10.1 (50.2) | 9.5 (49.1) | 10.4 (50.7) | 11.8 (53.2) | 13.3 (55.9) | 14.7 (58.5) | 15.7 (60.3) | 13.4 (56.1) |
| Average precipitation mm (inches) | 223 (8.8) | 213 (8.4) | 168 (6.6) | 74 (2.9) | 53 (2.1) | 46 (1.8) | 35 (1.4) | 40 (1.6) | 71 (2.8) | 127 (5.0) | 121 (4.8) | 187 (7.4) | 1,361 (53.6) |
Source: Climatempo

== Economy ==
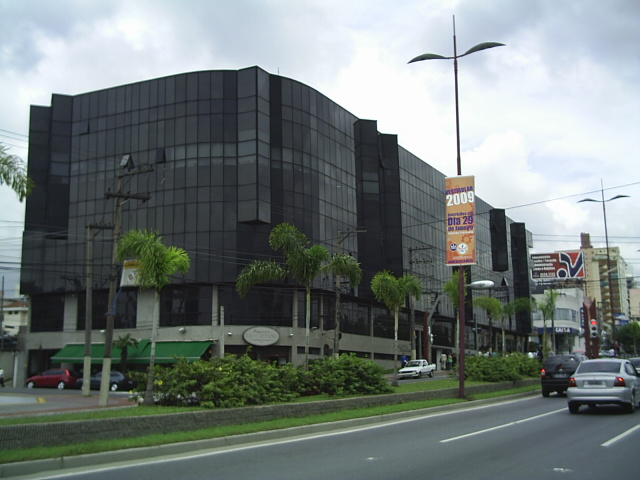
Commercial building at the Goiás avenue.

São Caetano do Sul belongs to the region of ABC Paulista, which was marked by industrial and automobile development. Some examples are the industries located on the border with São Paulo, and the General Motors headquarters in Brazil, on Goiás Avenue, the main financial center of the city. Nowadays, in the avenue, dams and branches of several companies are installed.

People from various regions of the metropolis go to the city on the job, coming mainly from the region of ABC itself and from the districts of the south and east of São Paulo that border the city.

Commerce is also a strong economic target for the city, which houses the headquarters of the Casas Bahia store chain, founded in 1952 by the Jewish immigrant Samuel Klein.

With the real estate growth in the region, a number of developments were created, among them Moov Espaço Cerâmica, which contributed to the generation of jobs in the city's civil construction.

== Standard of living ==
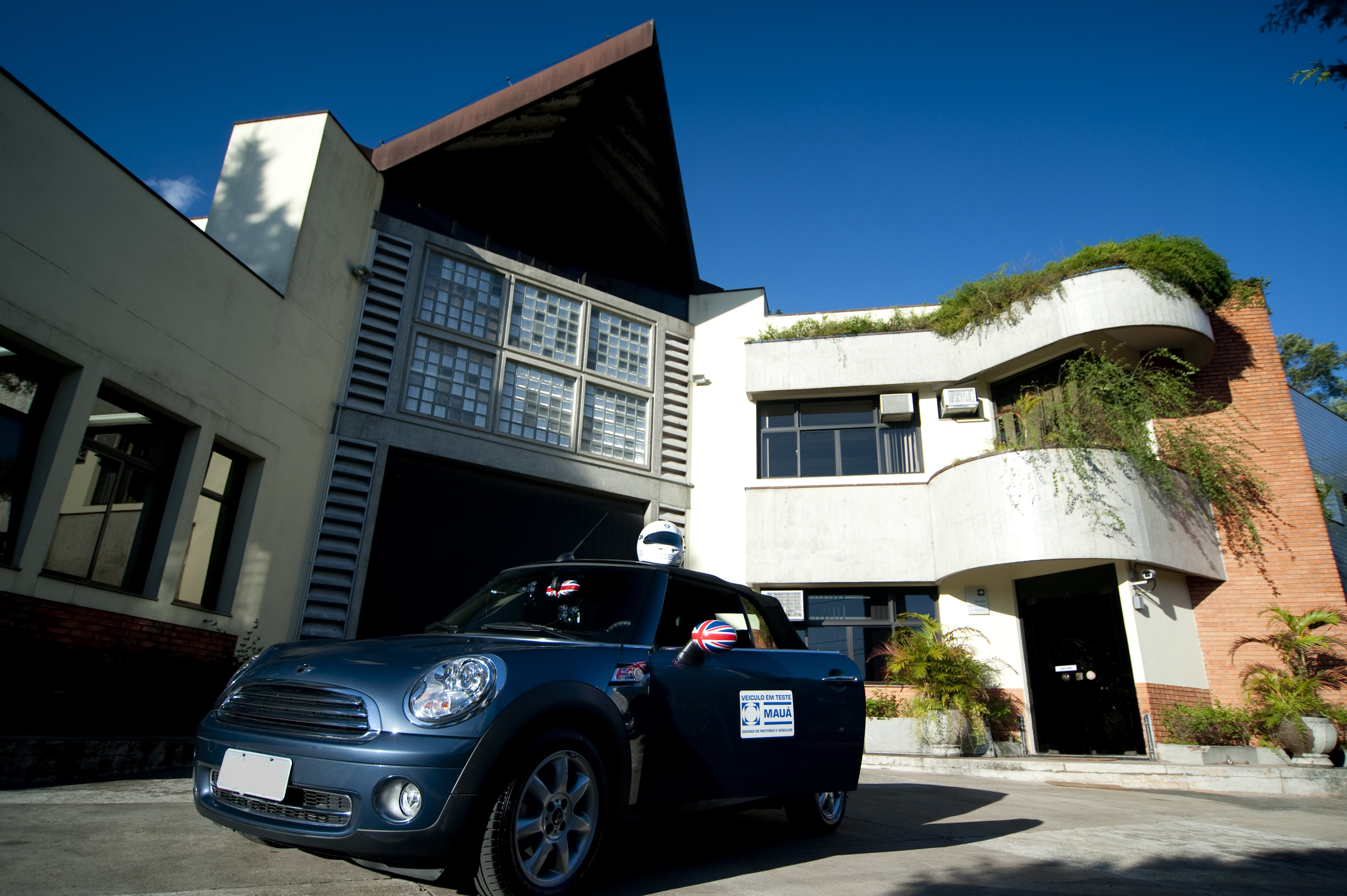
Instituto Mauá de Tecnologia

São Caetano do Sul boasts the highest social indicators anywhere in the country (even if using indexes such as those that compute the HDI formula). Illiteracy rates are very low and most people enjoy a safe city with well-maintained infrastructure. São Caetano has no favelas, with the closest one bordering Heliópolis, São Paulo's largest favela, next to a large Petrobras oil distribution and storage facility in nearby Ipiranga. Such border areas between São Caetano and adjacent cities São Bernardo do Campo and Santo André are prone to flooding which happens often, especially in the more impoverished areas bordering the city of São Paulo, where the Meninos creek (a tributary of the heavily polluted Tamanduateí river) is often littered with construction debris and garbage, exacerbating the flooding effect in the rainy season (Oct–Feb).

The city is served by a comprehensive network of bus routes that also connects São Caetano to its neighboring towns. There is also one commuter train line (operated by CPTM) that connects the city to São Paulo and its neighbors to the south, Santo André and Mauá.

== Demographics ==
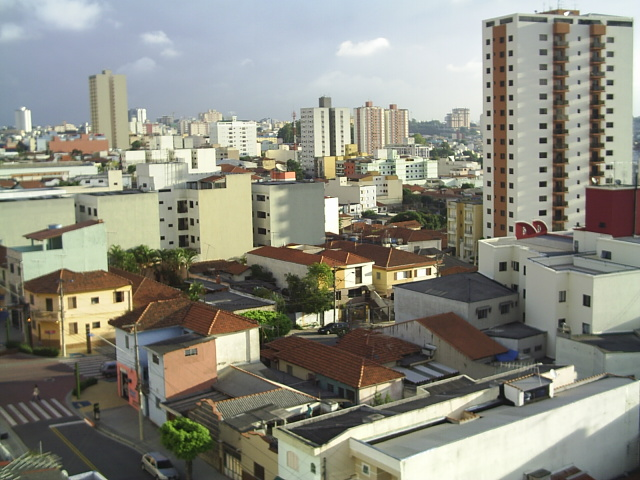
The vertical growth of the city occurs due to the fact that there is no more space for it to grow horizontally.

Immigrants from many nationalities have settled in São Caetano but the most significant groups are those of Italian, Spanish, Portuguese, German and Japanese ancestry. In the 1950s, nationals from rural Northeastern Brazil started arriving as the region experienced a rapid industrialization boom.

=== Access to domestic goods (% of population) ===
- Cellphones: 99.7%
- Telephone landlines: 99%
- Cars: 80.3%
- Personal Computers: 90.1%
- Color TVs: 99.4%
- Freezers: 100%

== Higher education ==
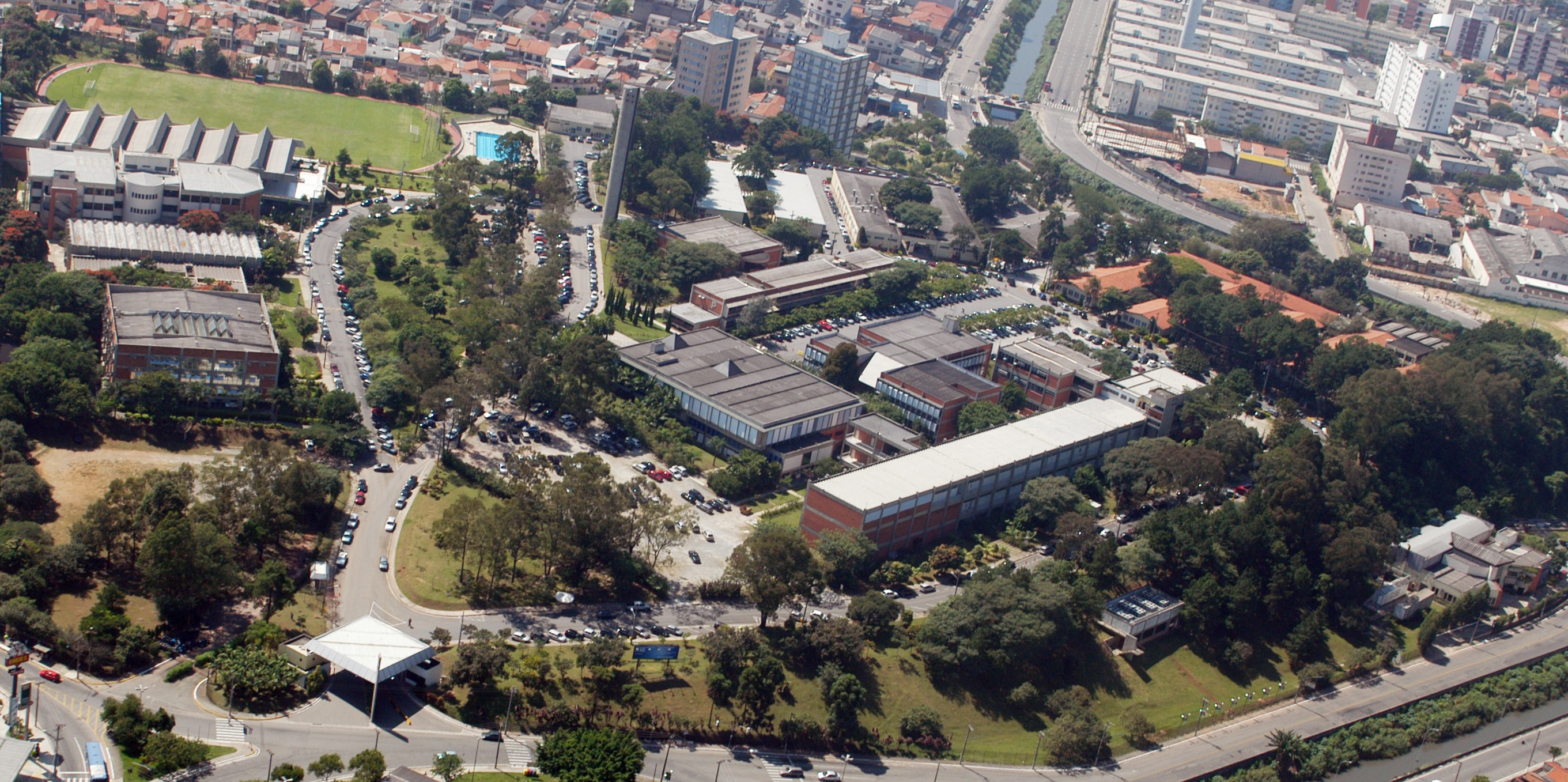
Instituto Mauá de Tecnologia campus in São Caetano

The city is served by three institutions of higher education: The Universidade Municipal de São Caetano do Sul, first known as Municipal College of Economics, Politics, and Social Sciences, founded in 1968 is the oldest. It became a full university in 2007. The other one Instituto Mauá de Tecnologia, which is a private, non-profit organization with headquarters located in São Paulo (city) with a campus on São Caetano do Sul. Also, founded in 2007 the Faculdade de Tecnologia de São Caetano do Sul (FATEC-SCS) which offers the technology degree courses as System Analysis and Development, Digital Games, Information Security, International Trade and Business Management.

== Media ==
In telecommunications, the city was served by Companhia Telefônica da Borda do Campo. In July 1998, this company was acquired by Telefónica, which adopted the Vivo brand in 2012. The company is currently an operator of cell phones, fixed lines, internet (fiber optics/4G) and television (satellite and cable).

== See also ==
- List of municipalities in São Paulo
