= Acquisition of U.S. Steel by Nippon Steel =

Business acquisition held from 2023 to 2025

- Initiator: Nippon Steel
- Target: U.S. Steel
- Type: All-cash full acquisition
- Cost: US$14.9 billion (including debt)
- Initiated: December 18, 2023
- Completed: June 18, 2025

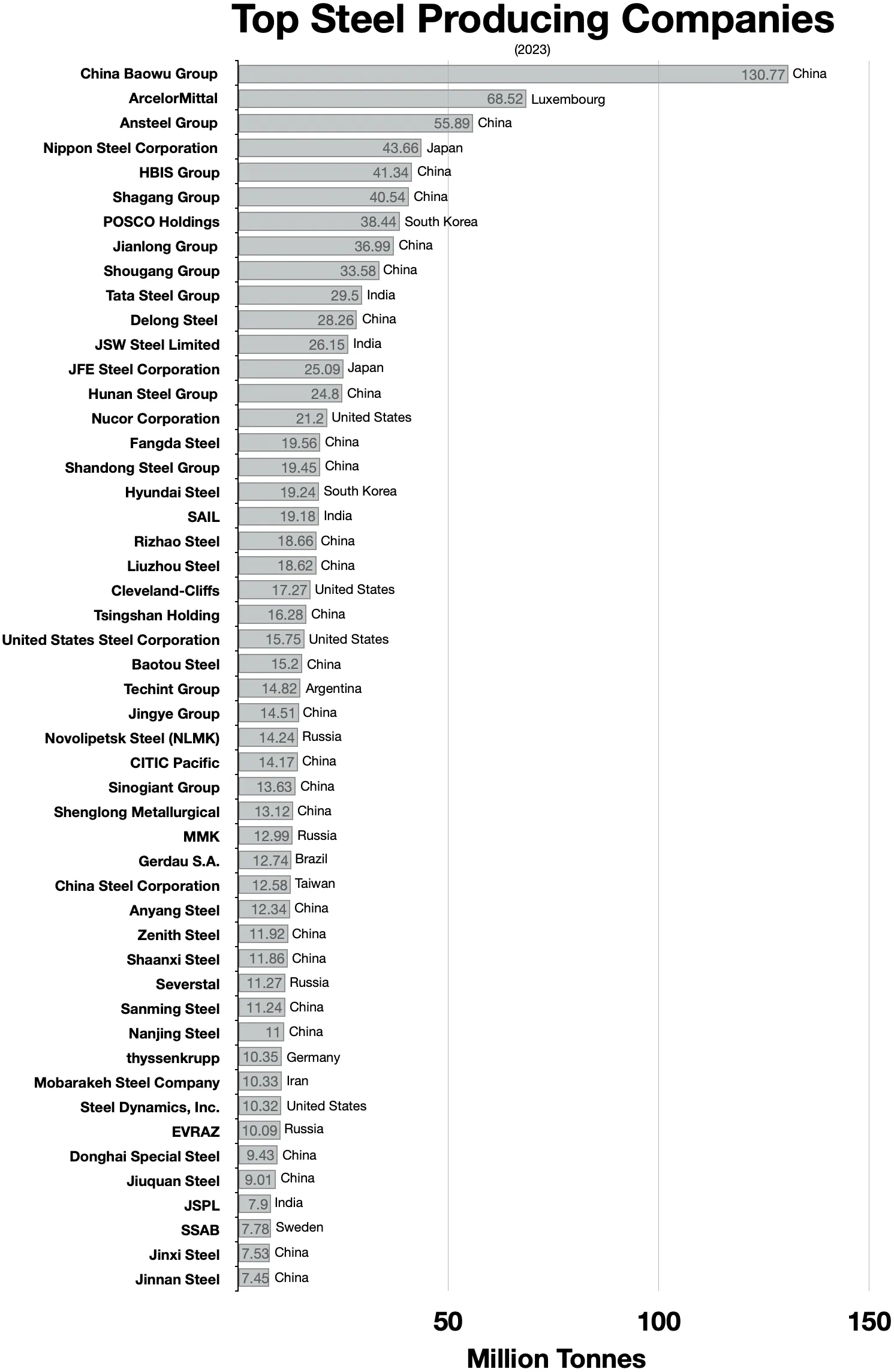
Top steel producing companies

On December 18, 2023, Japanese steelmaker Nippon Steel Corporation (NSC), the world's third-largest steel producer, agreed to buy United States Steel Corporation (U.S. Steel) for $14.9 billion.

Under the terms of the deal, U.S. Steel became a wholly owned subsidiary of NSC but retained its name and headquarters in Pittsburgh, Pennsylvania; the Japanese steelmaker also pledged to honor existing agreements with the United Steelworkers (USW) trade union. The purchase resulted in Nippon Steel becoming the second largest steel manufacturer in the world.

Foreign ownership of U.S. Steel, an icon of American industry, sparked controversy. Critics, including the White House, bipartisan lawmakers, and the USW, raised concerns about workers, supply chains, and national security.

Supporters, including officials and analysts, argued that the deal could revive U.S. Steel and strengthen the steel industry. They noted Japan's role as a key economic partner and investor.

On March 14, 2024, the Biden Administration opposed the acquisition. Former President Donald Trump also vowed to block the deal if re-elected.

The deal underwent an antitrust review by the U.S. Department of Justice, and a possible investigation by the Committee on Foreign Investment in the United States (CFIUS). Nippon Steel subsequently delayed its timeline for closing the deal from the middle of 2024 towards the end of the year. In September 2024, it was revealed that the Biden Administration was preparing to block Nippon's proposed acquisition of U.S. Steel.

On January 3, 2025, Joe Biden blocked the deal via an executive order. After Biden blocked the deal, two U.S. steel companies, Cleveland-Cliffs and Nucor, announced that they were interested in buying U.S. Steel, all cash, at a price in the high $30s per share.

On June 18, 2025, the acquisition was finalized, with the U.S. government gaining a golden share and extensive control over the company.

== Background ==
U.S. Steel, formed by J. P. Morgan's merger of Carnegie Steel with other steel producers, was once the largest company in the United States. The Pittsburgh-based steelmaker had held the record for the largest initial public offering of any company in history—becoming the first billion-dollar company—and was added to the Dow Jones Industrial Average on its first day of public trading on the New York Stock Exchange, April 1, 1900. In 1902, after its first full year of operation, U.S. Steel made 67 percent of all the steel produced in the United States, and was widely seen as a symbol of American industrial prowess.

By the time of the acquisition proposal, U.S. Steel had been in decline for decades, closing seven plants after the 1970s steel crisis and not exporting steel profitably until 1989.

The company was dropped from the Dow Jones the following year, and is today the smallest of the three major American steel producers; once the largest steelmaker in history, it ranks 27th in steel production worldwide.

=== 2023 bidding war ===
In August 2023, U.S. Steel became the focus of a bidding war. Cleveland-Cliffs made an early offer of $7.8 billion, proposing to pay $17.50 in cash plus shares valued at $35 each.

The United Steelworkers (USW) union, which maintains a collective bargaining agreement with the company, endorsed Cliffs' offer as the "best strategic partner", as phrased by USW president David McCall. U.S. Steel ultimately declined the deal, suggesting that Cliffs was attempting to prevent the company from conducting due diligence. This offer was also strongly opposed by lobbyists for major automakers including Toyota and General Motors, who argued that the new company, if the deal were to go through, would monopolize steel frames used in new cars and increase automaker costs.

Nucor, the largest steelmaker in the U.S. at the time of the deal with NSC, also was considered to be a potential suitor for U.S. Steel. A week prior to the NSC deal being announced, a corporate jet owned by U.S. Steel was spotted in Nucor's hometown of Charlotte, North Carolina, by Don Bilson, a corporate analyst for Gordon Haskett. The news caused the Pittsburgh steelmaker's stock to soar, though no comment from either Nucor nor U.S. Steel was provided on the matter.

Smaller and less significant bids additionally came from other companies. Luxembourg's ArcelorMittal and Canada's Stelco (formerly a U.S. Steel subsidiary) also placed bids for the Pittsburgh steelmaker, as did a later-withdrawn bid by the privately owned Esmark.

== Deal and blockage ==
On December 18, 2023, via a joint press conference from NSC's headquarters in Tokyo and U.S. Steel's headquarters in Pittsburgh, the companies announced that NSC would buy U.S. Steel for $55 per share at a 40% premium compared to the company's then-stock value. Additionally, the companies stated that U.S. Steel's headquarters as a subsidiary of Nippon Steel would remain in Pittsburgh, and that all existing collective bargaining and union agreements would be honored by NSC. The agreement included a clause requiring NSC to pay U.S. Steel a breakup fee of $565 million in the event that regulators block the acquisition.

According to the press release published to U.S. Steel's investor website, Citigroup is the financial advisor to NSC, with Ropes & Gray LLP serving as the legal advisor; U.S. Steel's financial advisors are Goldman Sachs, Evercore and Barclays, with Milbank LLP and Wachtell, Lipton, Rosen & Katz serving as legal advisors.

In March 2024, Nippon Steel Executive Vice President Takahiro Mori, who serves as key negotiator on the deal, stated that the company would move its existing U.S. headquarters from Houston to Pittsburgh in order to further secure the deal. In September 2024, it reported that the Biden administration was close to blocking the proposed acquisition, citing national security concerns. On January 3, 2025, Biden would officially block Nippon's Steel bid to purchase U.S. Steel. His administration was sued by Nippon Steel and U.S. steel on January 6. On January 12, the Biden administration announced that they had delayed the executive order to block the merger back to June 18, 2025, giving courts time to review the lawsuit by U.S. Steel and Nippon Steel.

=== Timeframe ===
In an earnings call on the day the deal was announced, U.S. Steel CEO David Burritt indicated to shareholders that the company anticipated the deal would be completed by the spring or summer of 2024. On January 11, 2024, Bloomberg News reported that unnamed insiders expect the dealmaking process to extend into late 2024 or 2025 as a result of regulatory scrutiny. Nippon Steel CEO Eiji Hashimoto stated in a briefing that he anticipates the deal will be finalized before the November 2024 U.S. presidential election.

U.S. Steel shareholders approved the deal in April 2024, with over 98% voting in favor. The following month, both companies announced that the proposed transaction had received all applicable regulatory approvals outside the U.S., including from the regulatory authorities of Mexico, Serbia, Slovakia, Turkey, the United Kingdom, and the European Union.

=== 2025 proxy battle ===
In January 2025, activist investment company Ancora Holdings launched a proxy battle against U.S. Steel, which would seek to end the Nippon Steel merger, replace Burritt as CEO, and pursue its own strategy to turn around the company instead of selling it to another buyer. Ancora argued that litigation to overturn Biden’s merger block was misguided and that the company should focus on financial and operational improvements. To that end, Ancora proposed former Stelco CEO Alan Kestenbaum as USS CEO; a move that United Steelworkers President McCall said was a “…better choice.” Kestenbaum had met with White House staffers, Steelworkers members and policy makers to garner support for his being named to lead USS. McCall’s remarks plus growing interest from union members in new leadership to allay their concerns about management and operational improvements suggest potential support for Kestenbaum. Ancora has also met with Secretary of Commerce Howard Lutnick over the acquisition. USS’ rejoinder is that Ancora is looking for a low-cost and uncertain transaction with possible antitrust ramifications.

Cleveland-Cliffs and Nucor were exploring a joint bid for U.S. Steel.

U.S. Steel warned that if the Nippon deal collapses, it may close plants and shift production to lower-cost facilities.

=== Finalized deal, golden share ===
On May 23, 2025, President Donald Trump announced a revised "planned partnership" between U.S. Steel and Nippon Steel, reversing his earlier opposition to the acquisition. Under the new terms, U.S. Steel would maintain its headquarters in Pittsburgh, and the company would be led by an American CEO with a board majority being U.S. citizens. Additionally, the U.S. government would receive a golden share allowing the U.S. president to appoint one of three board members and providing veto authority over corporate decisions, including the appointment of the other board members. Trump stated that Nippon Steel would invest $14 billion into U.S. operations, including $2.4 billion directed toward facilities in the Mon Valley region of Pennsylvania. The acquisition closed on June 18, 2025. U.S. Steel was delisted from the New York Stock Exchange on the same day.

According to Secretary of Commerce Howard Lutnick on June 14, the acquisition requires the president's approval for U.S. Steel to:

- Relocate U.S. Steel’s headquarters from Pittsburgh, Pennsylvania.
- Redomicile outside the United States
- Change the name of the company from U.S. Steel
- Reduce, waive, or delay the $14 billion of near-term investments into U.S. Steel
- Transfer production or jobs outside the United States
- Close or idle plants before certain timeframes other than normal course temporary idling for safety, upgrades, etc.
- Other protections regarding employee salaries, anti-dumping pricing, raw materials and sourcing outside the U.S., acquisitions, and more.

Later disclosures by the Securities and Exchange Commission showed that, after Trump leaves office, these powers are to transfer to the Treasury and Commerce departments.

The Cato Institute said the deal "effectively nationalizes U.S. Steel". According to Cato, "U.S. Steel’s new status as an SOE or 'public body' would mean that all its domestic transactions (yes, all) are subject to scrutiny and potential discipline under the USMCA and global anti-subsidy rules, respectively."

== Political reaction ==
=== Biden administration ===
On December 21, 2023, Lael Brainard, the director of the National Economic Council at the White House, indicated that President Joe Biden believes the proposed acquisition should be scrutinized. Brainard stated that Biden believes that the acquisition of an "iconic American-owned company by a foreign entity — even one from a close ally — appears to deserve serious scrutiny", citing potential national security and supply chain resiliency concerns.

Brainard indicated that the proposed acquisition would receive scrutiny from the Committee on Foreign Investment in the United States (CFIUS), an inter-agency committee chaired by the Secretary of the Treasury. CFIUS has the power to approve, block, or amend the deal on national security grounds, as well as the ability to give President Biden final decision-making authority. Once CIFUS formally opens an investigation, it has 90 days to make a recommendation; the president then has 15 days to act upon it.

On March 14, 2024, President Biden opposed the sale, citing national security risks. He vowed to block the deal using regulatory powers. The following month, the U.S. Department of Justice opened an in-depth antitrust investigation into the planned acquisition.

It is speculated that U.S. regulators may grant conditional approval to the deal if the firm makes changes to the management structure or ensures senior personnel are U.S. nationals; an advisor to President Biden stated that such a policy had been "settled" and that if the deal is to include foreign partners it would need a "different approach", declining to elaborate.

=== Japan ===
The Japanese government has reportedly sought to distance itself from the deal, stating it is a private commercial matter. During a state visit to the U.S., Japanese Prime Minister Fumio Kishida expressed hope that discussions would "unfold in directions that would be positive for both sides".

Japan changed its approach after prime minister Shigeru Ishiba took office in 2024. He urged the outgoing Biden administration to approve the acquisition in light of the ties between the two countries. President-elect Donald Trump had vowed to block the deal.

=== Members of Congress ===
The proposed acquisition became subject to condemnation from both Democratic and Republican politicians. Republican U.S. Senators JD Vance of Ohio, Josh Hawley of Missouri, and Marco Rubio of Florida indicated their opposition in a letter addressed to Secretary of the Treasury Janet Yellen. In the letter, they argued that enabling foreign companies to acquire crucial parts of American infrastructure would allow acquiring companies to avoid trade protections.

Separately, Ohio's Democratic senator Sherrod Brown condemned NSC's acquisition due to its apparent neglect of union voices and how any potential sale of U.S. Steel should give union leaders a seat at the table; he further endorsed a sale to Cleveland-Cliffs over NSC due to union endorsement. Brown as later joined by Pennsylvania Democratic senator John Fetterman, who stated that U.S. Steel "have sold themselves to a foreign nation and company". Retiring Democratic senator Joe Manchin from West Virginia also attacked the sale to NSC, echoing the three Republicans' national security concerns. In April 2024, Brown further pressed the White House to review Nippon Steel's ties to China; the Japanese steelmaker responded that its Chinese operations represented less than 5% of its total capacity.

=== Lobbying efforts ===
In January 2024, both parties to the transaction hired noted lobbyists to help navigate scrutiny of the proposed acquisition: Nippon Steel enlisted Akin Gump Strauss Hauer & Feld (Akin Gump), including former Representatives Ileana Ros-Lehtinen (R-FL) and Filemon Vela Jr. (D-TX), while U.S. Steel hired K&L Gates and Hogan Lovells, including former Senator Norm Coleman (R-MN). The same month, Nippon Steel President Hashimoto and Vice President Mori published an op-ed in the Wall Street Journal explaining the company's plan to grow U.S. Steel. Both companies have also launched a dedicated website to promote the deal as beneficial to the U.S. and various stakeholders.

Nippon Steel Vice Chairman Takahiro Mori has made several trips to the U.S. to meet with political and business leaders in Washington, D.C., as well as community leaders in U.S. Steel's home state of Pennsylvania, to win support for the deal.

== Other reactions ==
=== Labor unions ===
Despite the promise made by NSC to honor all active collective bargaining agreements, the United Steelworkers (USW) labor union starkly criticized the deal; unions previously preferred that Cleveland-Cliffs take over the steelmaker. The USW stated that its contract with U.S. Steel "requires any prospective buyer to agree to a new labor deal before a sale can be finalized", with union president David McCall further blasting the sale as "greedy". In March 2024, USW International President David McCall would publicly praise President Biden's decision to keep U.S. Steel "domestically owned and operated" claiming that Biden "has our backs" and that the decision to oppose the planned acquisition by Nippon Steel "should end the debate."

=== Policy institutes ===
Various think tanks and research organizations support the transaction. Research fellow Joel Griffith of the Thomas A. Roe Institute for economic policy studies at The Heritage Foundation, a prominent conservative think tank, argued that Nippon Steel's purchase of the long-declining and "shrunken" U.S. Steel would "infuse new life into this former behemoth with an infusion of cash, technology, and vision" and concluded that "[b]locking this acquisition will result in losses to shareholders, workers, and our economy". Griffith also contended that many opponents to the deal have wrongly fixated on Nippon Steel's foreign origins, noting that Japan is a major U.S. ally, the leading source of foreign direct investment (FDI) in the U.S., and the source of many American jobs through other private companies active in the country. These are arguments have also been made by Scott Lincicome, vice president of general economics at the libertarian Cato Institute, economist Michael R. Strain of the center-right American Enterprise Institute, and fellows Paul Sracic and William Chou of the Hudson Institute.

Echoing the above, the Council on Foreign Relations adds that the Biden administration's stance against the deal "raises questions about Washington’s commitment to allies and its openness to foreign investment".

=== Business organizations ===
A 13-page report by the pro-business Committee to Unleash Prosperity: "The deal offer from Nippon Steel provides an unprecedented premium to U.S. Steel shareholders, bolstering the company’s financial health and potential for growth. Moreover, the infusion of capital and technological advancements promised by Nippon Steel can rejuvenate U.S. Steel’s operations, enhancing productivity and competitiveness".
