= AmeriGas =

Largest retail propane distributor in the United States

AmeriGas Partners, L.P.
- Type: Subsidiary
- Industry: Energy industry
- Founded: 1959; 67 years ago
- Headquarters: King of Prussia, Pennsylvania, United States
- Area served: United States
- Key people: Michael Sharp, CEO & President
- Services: Propane distribution
- Revenue: ▲$2.822 billion (2018)
- Net income: ▲$0.190 billion (2018)
- Total assets: ▼$3.925 billion (2018)
- Total equity: ▼$0.536 billion (2018)
- Number of employees: 8,500 (2025)
- Parent: UGI Corporation
- Website: www.amerigas.com

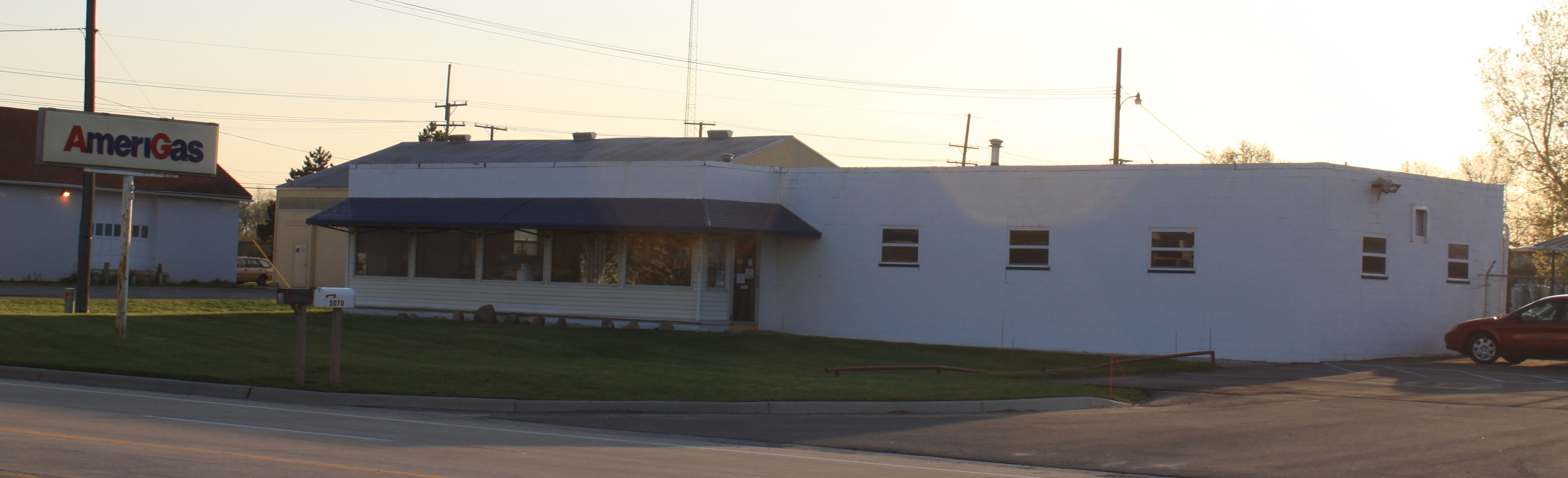
AmeriGas facility in Ypsilanti, Michigan

AmeriGas Partners, L.P. is the largest retail propane distributor in the United States based on the volume of propane gallons distributed annually. It serves over 1.7 million residential, commercial, industrial, agricultural, wholesale and motor fuel customers in all 50 states from approximately 1,900 propane distribution locations. It is headquartered in King of Prussia, Pennsylvania and is a subsidiary of UGI Corporation.

== History ==
AmeriGas was founded in 1959.

In October 2008, it acquired the propane assets of Penn Fuel Propane for $32 million.

In January 2012, it acquired Heritage Propane from Energy Transfer Partners for approximately $1.46 billion in cash and $1.32 billion in common units and the assumption of debt.

On August 21, 2019, UGI Corporation acquired the portion of AmeriGas that it did not already own. Prior to the acquisition, AmeriGas shareholder, Peter Votto, filed a lawsuit in U.S. District Court to halt the deal due to "potential conflicts of interest faced by the Board." The case was voluntarily dismissed two months later.

== Lawsuits ==
In June 2018, Michigan Attorney General Bill Schuette filed a lawsuit against AmeriGas alleging that the company had violated the Michigan Consumer Protection Act. This was the second time the Attorney General filed suit against the company in four years.

On November 14, 2019, the Delta Saloon in Virginia City, Nevada filed a lawsuit in Washoe County District Court claiming that AmeriGas failed to refill the propane tanks, then allegedly improperly refilled the tanks, leading to an explosion on March 12, 2019. The explosion caused $3 million in damage to the historic building.

In March 2020, AmeriGas was required to face Michigan Attorney General Dana Nessel's consumer lawsuit after the U.S. Court of Appeals for the Sixth Circuit found it was removable under the Class Action Fairness Act.
