= Tatuí =

City in São Paulo state, Brazil

- Municipality
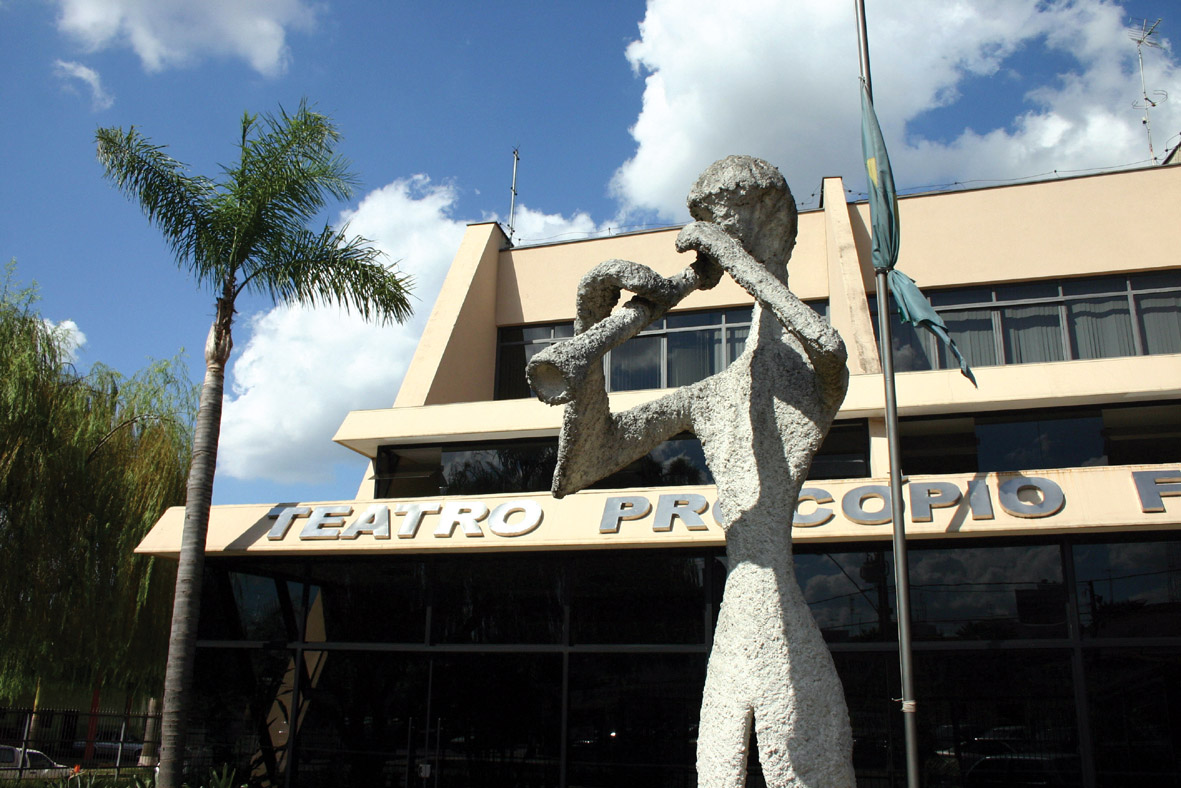

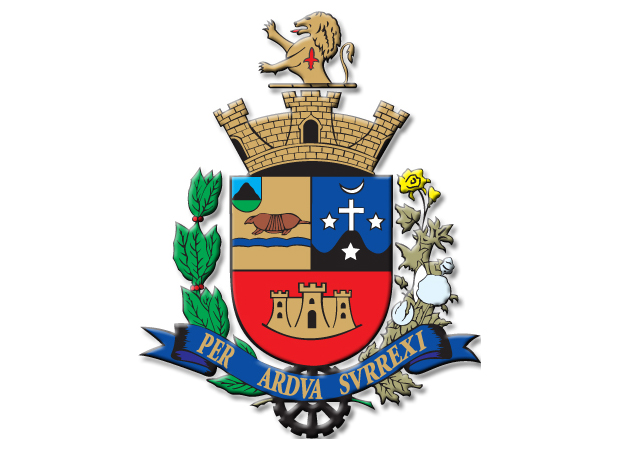
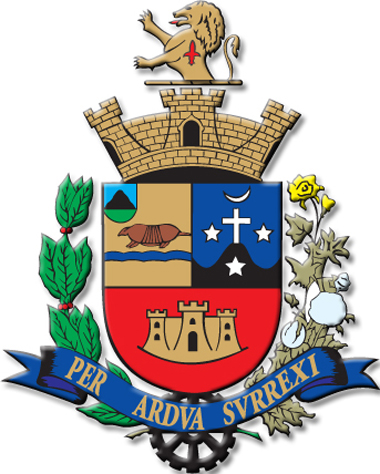
- Flag Coat of arms
- Motto: Per ardua svrrexi (Latin)
- Location in São Paulo state

- Location in Brazil
- Coordinates: 23°21′20″S 47°51′25″W
- Country: Brazil
- Region: Southeast Brazil
- State: São Paulo
- Metropolitan Region: Sorocaba

Area
  - Total: 523.75 km^{2} (202.22 sq mi)

Population (2022 Census)
  - Total: 123,942
  - Estimate (2025): 129,130
  - Density: 236.64/km^{2} (612.90/sq mi)
- Time zone: UTC-3 (BRT)
  - Summer (DST): UTC-2 (BRST)
- Website: www.tatui.sp.gov.br

Tatuí is a city located in São Paulo state, Brazil, part of the Metropolitan Region of Sorocaba. It is known for having the largest music institution in Brazil and one of the largest in Latin America, the Conservatório Dramático e Musical Dr. Carlos de Campos.

Tatuí's population is 123,942 2022 Census) in an area of 523.75 km^{2}.

== Etymology ==
The name Tatuí comes from the Tupi language and means "River of Armadillos".

== History ==
The village was founded in 1680 by Bandeirantes. It is possible that the site had a significant concentration of Indians. In 1823 the city experienced an amazing surge of progress, with 800 buildings in the urban area and several manufacturing companies. Present-day Tatuí was founded on August 11, 1826.

== Music ==
Created by state law in 1951, and officially founded in 1954, the Conservatório Dramático e Musical Dr. Carlos de Campos in Tatuí represents one of the most successful achievements of the State of São Paulo, and perhaps of Brazil, in the music teaching field. Supported by the State Government, through its Secretaria de Cultura, the Conservatory is managed by AACT, a non-profit organization which employs over 300 teachers, musicians and administrative personnel distributed in the various areas of the institution, such as Classical Music, Orchestras, Big-bands, Brazilian Popular Music, Jazz, Drama and the art of making string instruments – the latter, one of the rare and the most important courses in the area in Brazil. By means of another State law, the city of Tatuí was nominated “The Capital of Music” in Brazil, due to the Conservatory's relevant performance in both artistic and pedagogic work.

Known as a center of excellence in music teaching in Latin America, the conservatory is located in the city of Tatuí, a pleasant town with a population of 117,000 inhabitants and situated 130 km from the capital of the state, São Paulo. The conservatory includes in its student body more than 3,000 youngsters from over 20 states in Brazil, and 67 from various countries, such as Peru, Paraguay, France, Japan and the United States. All courses offered are tuition-free, and for those students who come from distant places in Brazil or from other countries, free room and board may also be offered.

Some of the conservatory's former music students now belong to OSESP, Latin America's leading symphony orchestra, conducted by Pascal Tortelier, as well as other Brazilian symphonic groups. Many students have been awarded scholarships for study in the United States, where some of them now teach at local universities and/or play in various orchestras there, as well as in France and the United Kingdom. One such grant from the Karajan Foundation was given to at least two former students member of the Conservatório de Tatuí.

Among past alumni now performing and teaching successfully abroad is the acclaimed cellist Dr. Tania Lisboa, a permanent member of the Royal College of Music in London. Other students now residing and working professionally in Austria and Germany include Luis Garcia a former permanent horn player of the Berlin Staatskapelle under conductor Daniel Barenboim. The Conservatorio de Tatui is administered by its executive director, Prof. Dr. Henrique Autran Dourado (New England Conservatory of Music of Boston, USA), administrative and financial director, Dalmo Defensor (Economist at the University of São Paulo), pedagogic assistant, Antonio Ribeiro (State University of São Paulo, composer and researcher), and artistic assistant, Erik Heimann (Trinity College of London).

The Conservatory's music hall (Teatro Procopio Ferreira) presents over 300 performances per year, such as symphonic, jazz, Brazilian popular music, drama and shows. Events include various international festivals, such as the São Paulo version of RICE (Rio International Cello Encounter), International Early Music Encounter, and competitions such as the National Violin Making Concours, Spartaco Rossi Piano Competition among many others. At least, one master class is performed in the Theater, weekly, and guest conductors and soloists from other states and countries are frequently invited to perform with the Conservatory's Symphony Orchestra and Wind Ensemble.

== Education ==
One of the major schools in Tatuí is the technical school "Salles Gomes", offering secondary and technical courses of good quality. FATEC - Tatuí (São Paulo State Technological College).

== Media ==
In telecommunications, the city was served by Companhia Telefônica Brasileira until 1973, when it began to be served by Telecomunicações de São Paulo. In July 1998, this company was acquired by Telefónica, which adopted the Vivo brand in 2012.

The company is currently an operator of cell phones, fixed lines, internet (fiber optics/4G) and television (satellite and cable).

== Sports ==
Besides music, association football is another passion of the people of Tatuí. Notable clubs include:

- Clube de Campo
- Santa Cruz de Tatuí
- XI de Agosto
- Realmatismo

== Notable people ==
- Mario Longhi, CEO of United States Steel from 2013 to 2017.
- Adhemar, footballer, top scorer of the Copa João Havelange.
- Rodinei, footballer.

== See also ==
- List of municipalities in São Paulo
- Interior of São Paulo
