= Philadelphia Gas Works =

Natural gas utility owned by and serving Philadelphia

Coordinates: 39.979232°N 75.149268°W

- Company type: Public utility
- Industry: Energy industry
- Founded: 1836
- Headquarters: Philadelphia, Pennsylvania, United States
- Services: Natural Gas
- Website: www.pgworks.com

Philadelphia Gas Works (PGW) is the United States' largest municipally owned natural gas utility. Construction was completed by engineer Samuel V. Merrick on January 22, 1838, and operations continued from the 1800s to the present day.

== History ==
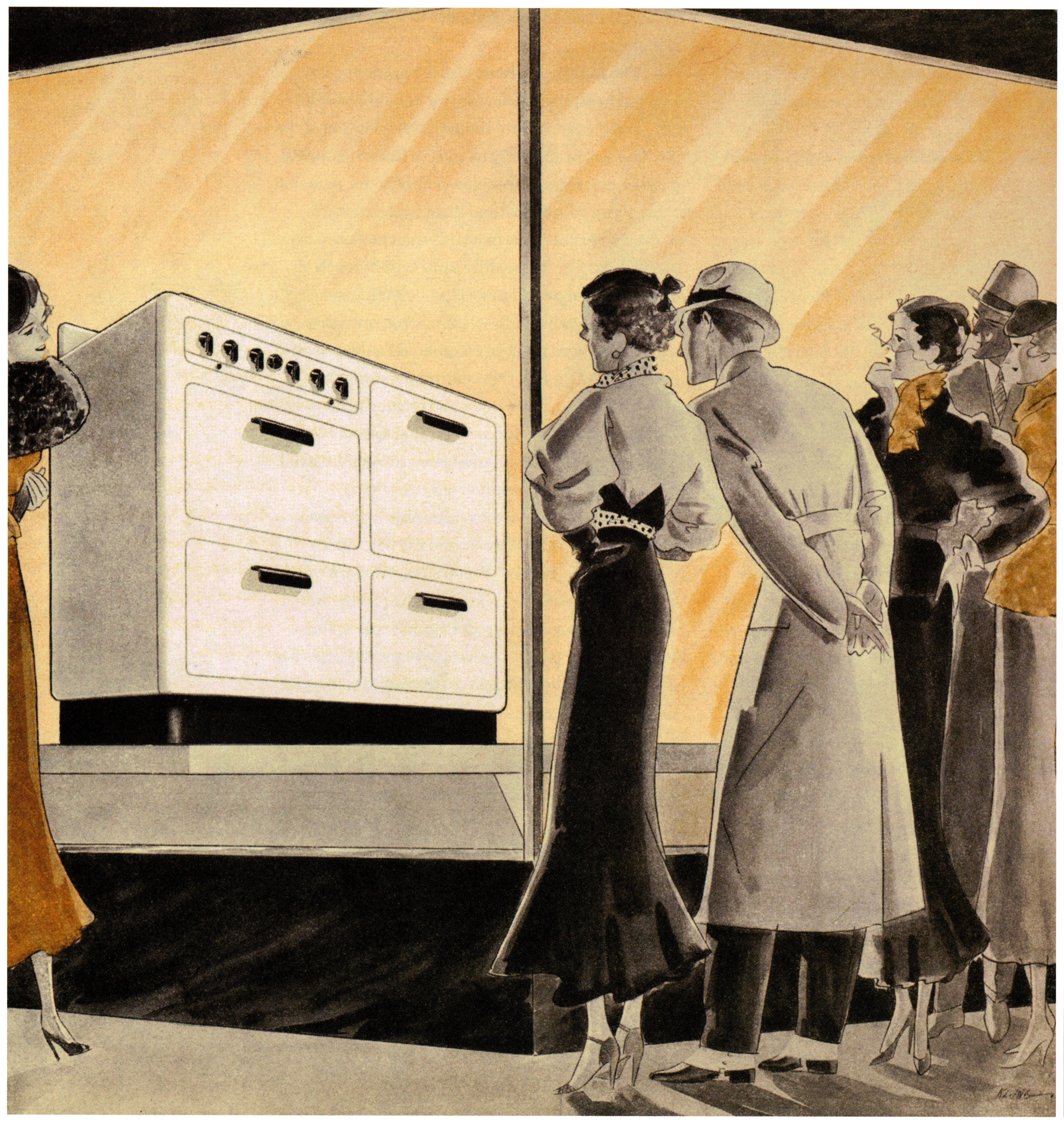
The Acorn gas range, designed by Norman Bel Geddes, from a PGW brochure of c. 1932–33.

Less than a year after the passage of "An Ordinance For the Construction and Management of The Philadelphia Gas Works" by the Select and Common Councils of Philadelphia on March 21, 1835, the Philadelphia Gas Works began providing gas service to the City of Philadelphia when the city's first 46 gas lights were turned on along Second Street, between Vine and South Streets on February 10, 1836. Construction of the Philadelphia Gas Works was subsequently completed by engineer Samuel V. Merrick on January 22, 1838.

In 1841, PGW came under city ownership. Half a century later, the UGI Corporation (then United Gas Improvement Company) was contracted by the city in 1897 to operate and manage PGW.

By the 1940s, PGW was serving some 500,000 customers in Philadelphia, providing 99% of the gas distributed within the city limits. At this time, the gas provided was primarily carbureted water gas. In 1947, the City of Philadelphia stated that it valued PGW at more than US$100,000,000.

Similar contracts to the one implemented with UGI in 1897 continued to be approved by city leaders until December 1972, at which time Mayor Frank Rizzo and the Philadelphia City Council contracted with the nonprofit Philadelphia Facilities Management Corporation (PFMC) to operate and manage PGW, beginning on January 1, 1973.

The seven-member board of directors of the Philadelphia Facilities Management Corporation is appointed by the mayor. Its charge, as set forth in a management agreement between the City and the PFMC, makes the PFMC responsible for all operations of PGW through an executive management team, which includes a chief executive officer, chief operating officer, and chief financial officer.
