= Fernando Figueredo =

American politician

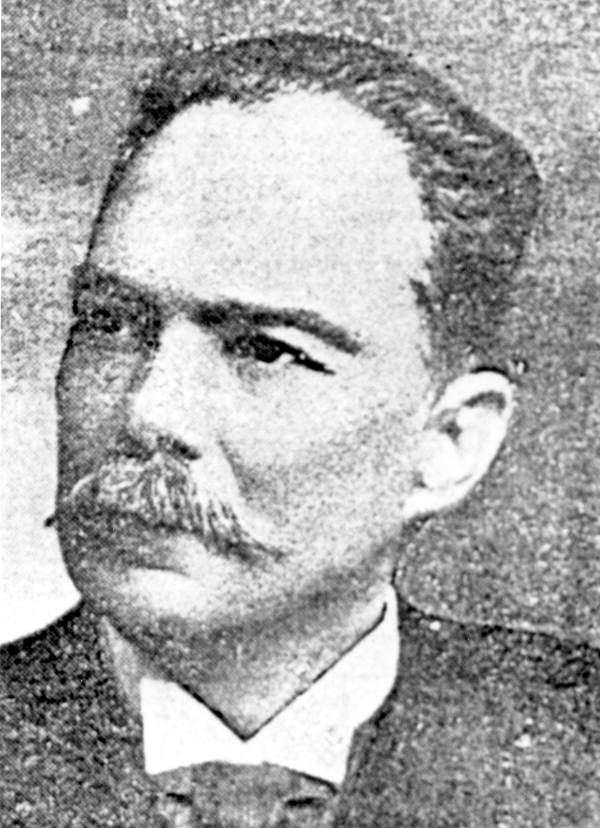
Figueredo in 1885

Fernando Figueredo was the first Cuban-American to serve in the Florida State Legislature. He represented Monroe County in 1885. He also had many other accomplishments under his name.

He served as county school superintendent.
