= Instituto Mauá de Tecnologia =

Brazilian non-profit organization

- Type: Private
- Established: 1961
- Rector: José Carlos de Souza Junior
- Location: São Paulo (city) and São Caetano do Sul
- Website: http://www.maua.br
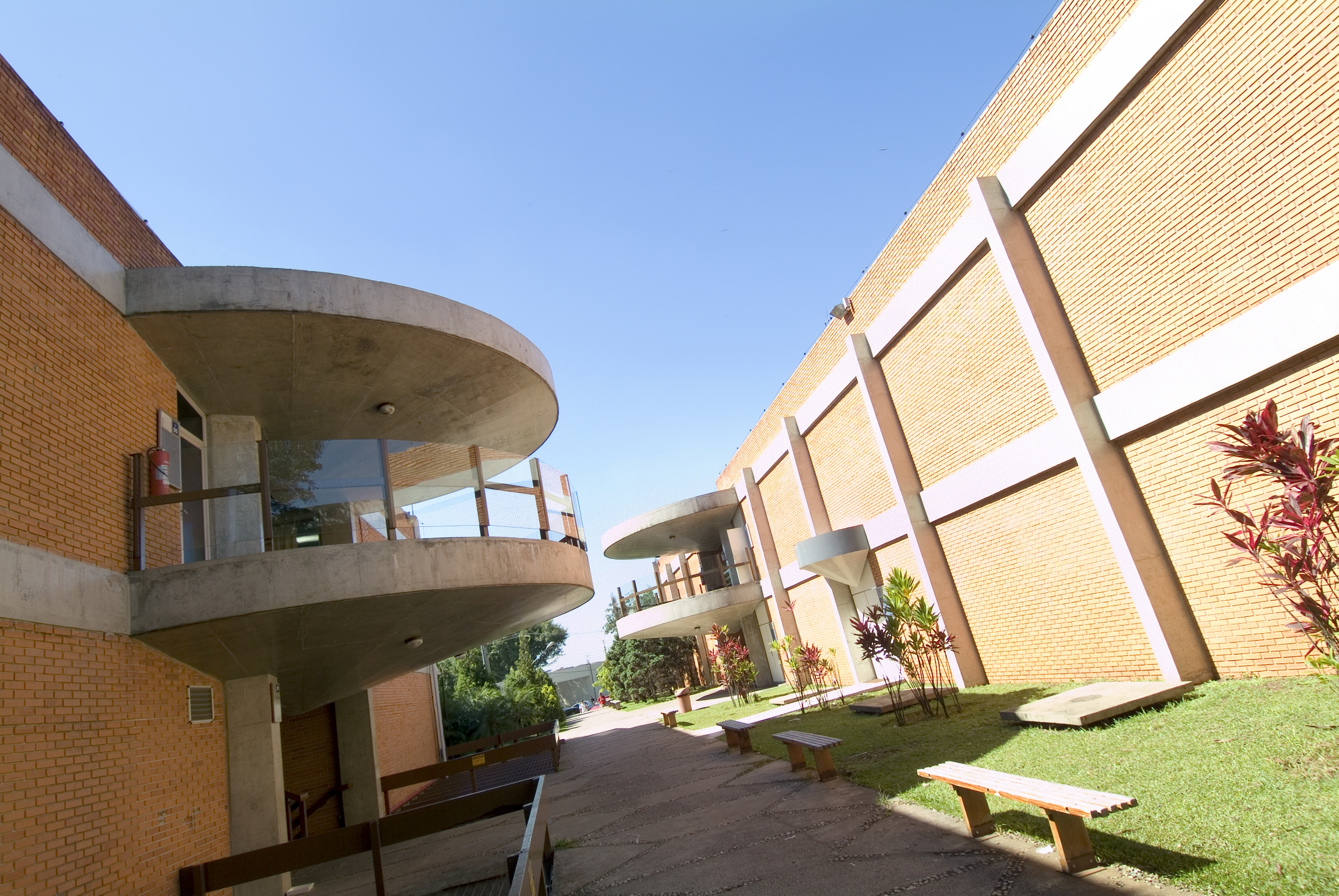

Instituto Mauá de Tecnologia (Mauá Institute of Technology, short IMT) is a private, non-profit organization with headquarters located in São Paulo (city). The main objective of IMT is to promote technical-scientific education, technological research, and development aiming to provide highly qualified human resources to contribute to the socioeconomic development of Brazil.

IMT maintains two units: IMT University and Technical Services and Tests Center.

== IMT University ==
IMT University has the mission of improving and actualizing education and research in scientific areas, technology development and management. The accreditation of IMT University by the Brazilian Ministry of Education testifies the implemented pedagogic projects quality, faculty qualification and academic work conditions of their students.

The post-graduation coordination offers to graduated students the opportunity to continue their studies in post-graduation programmes.

IMT University unities have an environment which provides the professional development of their students with an excellent facility of its laboratory and a high qualified teaching staff. Most of faculty members in IMT University hold a master's degree or PhD from Brazilian, North American or European universities.

Students of IMT count on a modern Library; an Internship Coordination, which supports the students and alumni to get a job; advanced Laboratories; Sports and Physical Activities Center; and Junior Enterprises of Engineering and Administration.

=== São Caetano do Sul campus ===
Located 12 km from the center of São Paulo, with an area of 130,000 m^{2}, São Caetano do Sul campus has a wide infrastructure which includes Eng. Álvaro de Souza Lima Library, laboratories and Sports and Physical Activities Center.

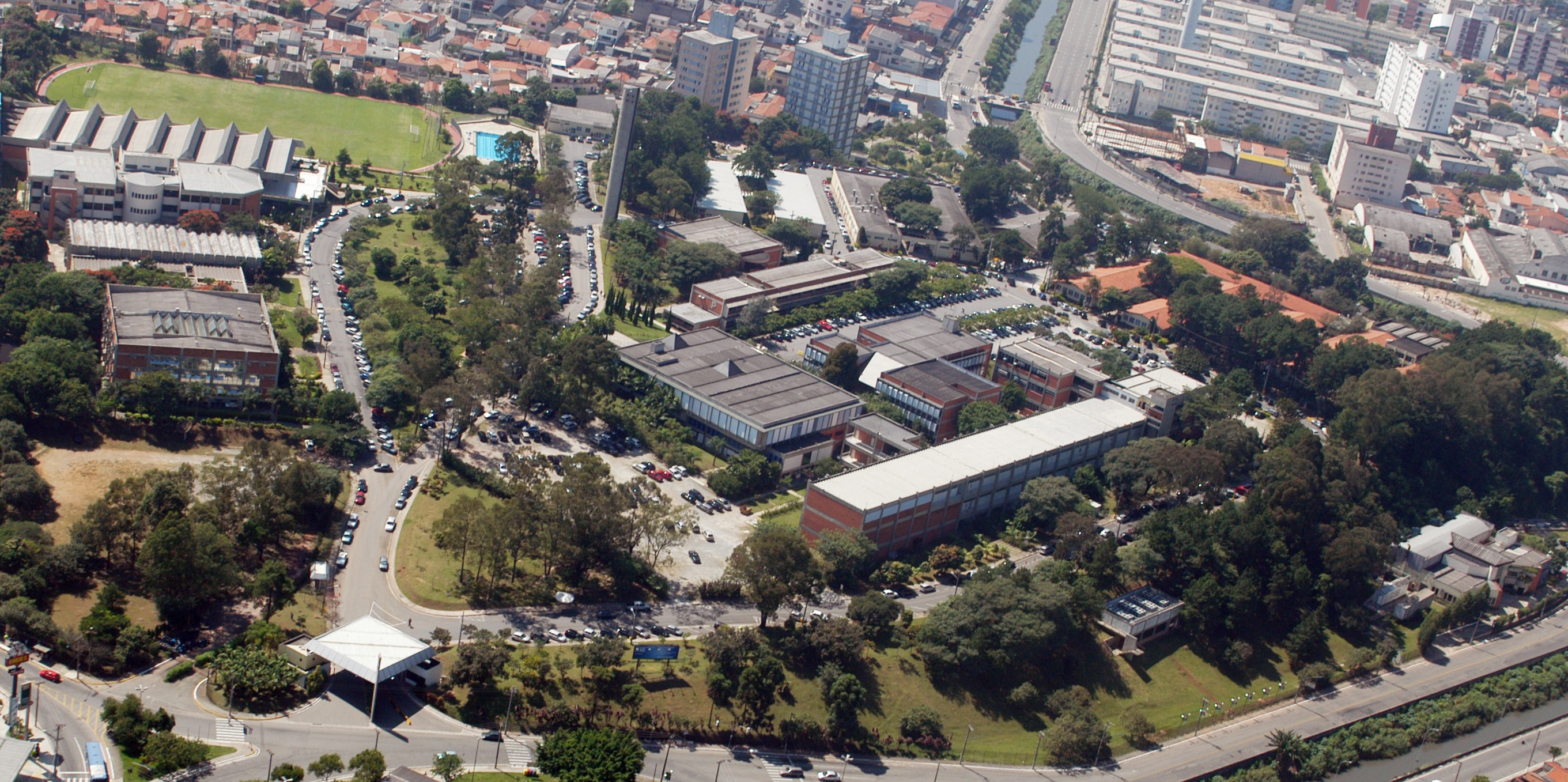
São Caetano do Sul campus

=== Laboratories ===
IMT University has 102 laboratories with modern equipment installed in 9,500 m^{2} of construction area. It includes laboratories of: Engine Tests, Mechanical Tests, Metrology, Microwaves, Basic Sanitation, Metallography, Machine Construction, Soil Mechanics, Food processing pilot plant, Biology and Microbiology, Biotech and Biochemical Engineering, Control and Automation, Image Processing, Electrical Machines and Thermal Science.

=== Sports and Physical Activities Center ===
Sports and Physical Activities Center has all the facilities, which includes a soccer camp, sports gymnasium, semi Olympic swim pool, dressing room and snack bar, in an area of 13,800 m^{2}.

=== São Paulo campus ===
São Paulo campus, located less than 1 km from Ibirapuera Park, has a modern building with an area of 3,300 m^{2} which includes a department of Eng. Álvaro de Souza Lima Library and a laboratory.

== Courses ==
Undergraduate Programs

São Paulo campus

- Business Administration

São Caetano do Sul campus

- Product Design
- Food Engineering
- Civil Engineering
- Control and Automation (Mechatronics) Engineering
- Electrical Engineering
- Mechanical Engineering
- Mechanical Production Engineering
- Chemical Engineering

Continuing Education

São Paulo campus

Post-Graduate Non-degree Programs (180 hours)

- Entrepreneurial Leadership
- Entrepreneurial Logistics
- Project Management
- Strategic Marketing and Sales Management

MBA (360 hours)

- Entrepreneurial Leadership
- Environmental Management and Sustainability
- Executive - Administration for Engineers
- Project Management
- TI Executive

São Caetano do Sul campus

Post-Graduate Non-degree Programs (180 hours)

- Automation and Industrial Control
- Civil Engineering - Management of Civil Working Areas
- Cosmetic Areas
- Cosmetic Technology
- Specialization Degree Programs (180 hours)
- Automotive Engineering
- Food Processes Development
- Packaging Engineering

MBA (360 hours)

- Engineering and Businesses of Gas and Petroleum
- Environmental Management

Master in Engineering

São Caetano do Sul campus

- Biochemical Engineering Processes
- Chemical Engineering Processes
- Food Engineering

== Technical Services and Tests Center ==
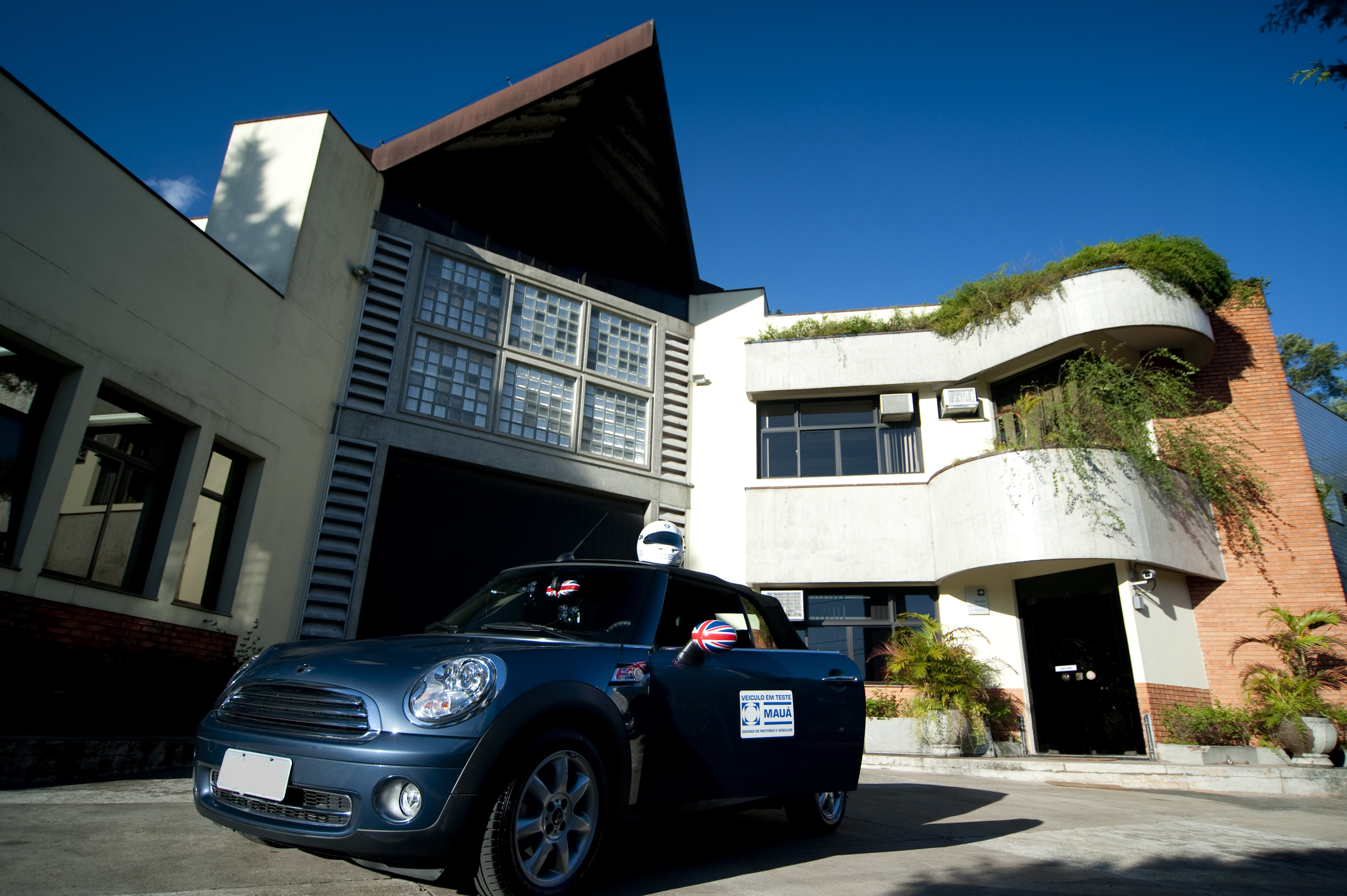
Technical Services and Tests Center - Engines and Vehicles Division

The Technical Services and Tests Center was established in 1966 with the purpose of meeting the needs of the industries regarding products and processes. A laboratory infrastructure was put in place in order to make tests and analyses. In a second phase, it started providing technological support to companies to improve processes, products and services, a technology development center in several different fields, and offering the following services to manufacturing and services companies:

- Applied technology research;
- Product and process development;
- Tests, analyses, expert opinion reports and certification;
- Projects, consulting, advisory services and planning;
- Specialized training.

The Technical Services and Tests Center has a customer service structure in place through its Technical Divisions established by fields: Food Engineering, Biochemistry, Automation and Control, Electronic, Civil, Mechanical Engineering, Metrology, Microwave Technology, Telecommunications, Engines and Vehicles, Chemistry and Paints, Road Signaling and Safety. The technical staff at the Center comprises experienced professionals with different degrees, qualified on different areas, and the center also counts on IMT University faculty as experts and consultants. The participation of IMT University students in activities at the Research Center provides them with the opportunities to participate in vocational internships.

== See also ==
- Brazil University Rankings
- Universities and Higher Education in Brazil
