= Altice Portugal =

Portuguese telecommunication company, Altice subsidiary

MEO Portugal S.A.
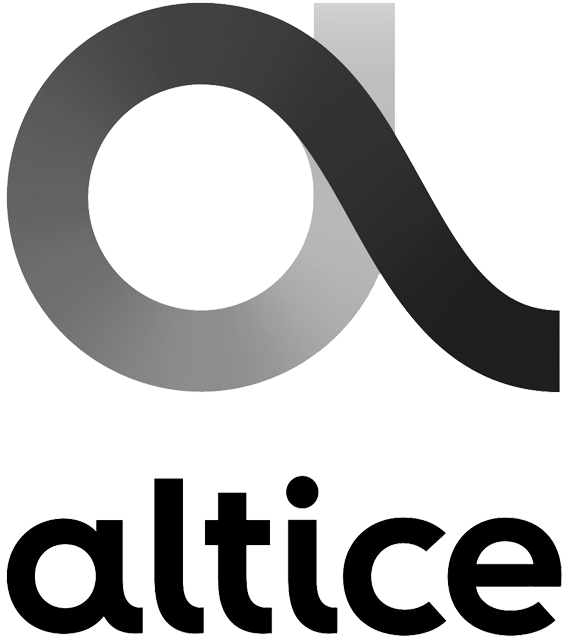
- Type: Subsidiary
- Industry: Telecommunications
- Founded: 1994; 32 years ago (as Portugal Telecom); 2018; 8 years ago (as Altice Portugal)
- Headquarters: Lisbon, Portugal
- Key people: Ana Figueiredo (CEO)
- Products: Fixedline & Mobile Telephony; Fixedline & Mobile Internet; Digital Television; IT Services
- Revenue: €2.718 billion (2014)
- Operating income: €1.053 billion (2014)
- Net income: €384.0 million (2014)
- Total assets: €7.400 billion (end 2014)
- Total equity: €1.650 billion (end 2014)
- Number of employees: 10,701 (end 2014)
- Parent: Altice
- ASN: 8657
- Peering policy: Open
- Website: MEO

MEO Portugal S.A. (formerly known as Altice Portugal S.A. and PT Portugal) is the largest telecommunications service provider in Portugal. Since 2 June 2015 the company has been a wholly owned subsidiary of Altice, a multinational cable and telecommunications company with a presence in France, Israel, Belgium, Luxembourg, Portugal, French West Indies/Indian Ocean Area, the Dominican Republic, and Switzerland. It currently owns the MEO, Moche and SAPO brands.

The assets in Portugal were sold to Altice in 2015 per request of Oi SA to reduce debt. The African assets were mostly sold for the same reason.

The business group formerly called Portugal Telecom, SGPS, SA was divided into PT Portugal SGPS, SA - a company with assets such as MEO - and PT SGPS, a financial holding company with 25.6% of Oi and with a risk investment valued at approximately 900 million euros - which after May 29, 2015 is called Pharol, with headquarters in Amoreiras Plaza.

== History ==
The first telephone experiments in Portugal connected Carcavelos to the Central do Cabo in Lisbon, in 1877. In 1882, the Edison Gower-Bell Telephone Company was established in both Lisbon and Porto, to develop the respective telephone service concessions. In 1887, the concession was transferred to APT - The Anglo Portuguese Telephone Company, which lasted until 1968, when the Public Company "Telefones de Lisboa e Porto" (TLP) was created. The Post Office, Telegraphs and Telephones (CTT) operated the telephone service in the rest of the country. For the operation of radiotelegraphy and wireless telephone, a contract with the Marconi's Wireless Telegraphy Company concession was confirmed in 1922. In 1925, the "Companhia Portuguesa Rádio Marconi" (CPRM) was set up and took on all responsibilities of the previous concession.

In 1970, CTT became a Public Company and in 1989, the TLP was transformed into a Limited Company, and was controlled by the State.

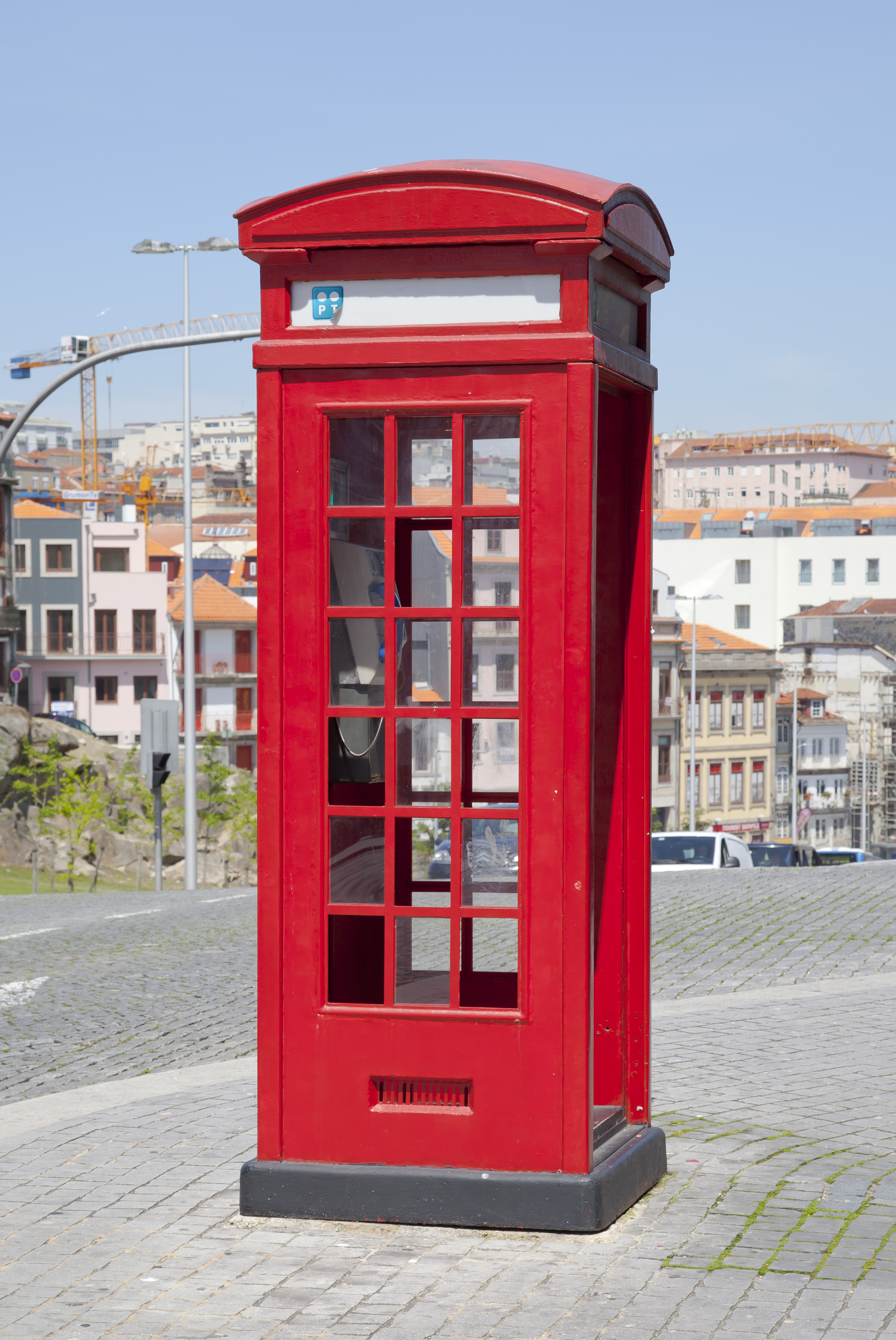
APT heritage still in use in Porto

Throughout October 1992, the Portuguese government and the Public Service Television Corporation RTP agreed to separate the transmitter network from the rest of the corporation, transferring it to a recently created state-owned company named "Teledifusão de Portugal" (TDP). The purpose of this was to create a nationwide TV broadcasting network available for any TV station in Portugal to request its services. At the time, RTP (a "native" client of TDP) was facing competition for the first time since its creation in the 1950s. SIC required the services of TDP, but TVI decided to create its own transmitter Network (RETI), RTP's monopoly shaken after 35 years.

In 1992, CTT became a Limited Company with public capital and the Comunicações Nacionais, SPGS, SA (CN) was created, a state holding company responsible for the managing of all state participation within the sector, comprising CTT, TLP, CPRM and TDP. That year, the telecommunications operations of CTT were detached with the creation of Telecom Portugal, SA, allowing CTT to dedicate itself to postal services. With this, Portugal's telecommunications network was operated by three operators: TLP in the Lisbon and Porto areas, Telecom Portugal was responsible for the remaining national, European and Mediterranean communications; and Marconi took on international traffic. In 1994, a single national telecommunications operator was created with the combination of the companies within the CN State holding: Portugal Telecom, SA merged into one Telecom Portugal, TLP and TDP.

Portugal Telecom was the only telephone operator in Portugal, being a monopoly, until 1994, when the government gradually reduced its control over the corporation. In 2000, Portugal Telecom became a publicly owned company.

In 2003, PT Portugal and Telefónica formed a joint venture, at the time, the largest mobile network operator in the Brazilian market and the southern hemisphere, Vivo with more than 30 million customers. PT, because it owned Telesp Celular, maintained a strong position in this partnership (50%). In August 2005, the company was embroiled in the Brazilian political scandal, known as the mensalão scandal, although no evidence was ever presented about the company's involvement.

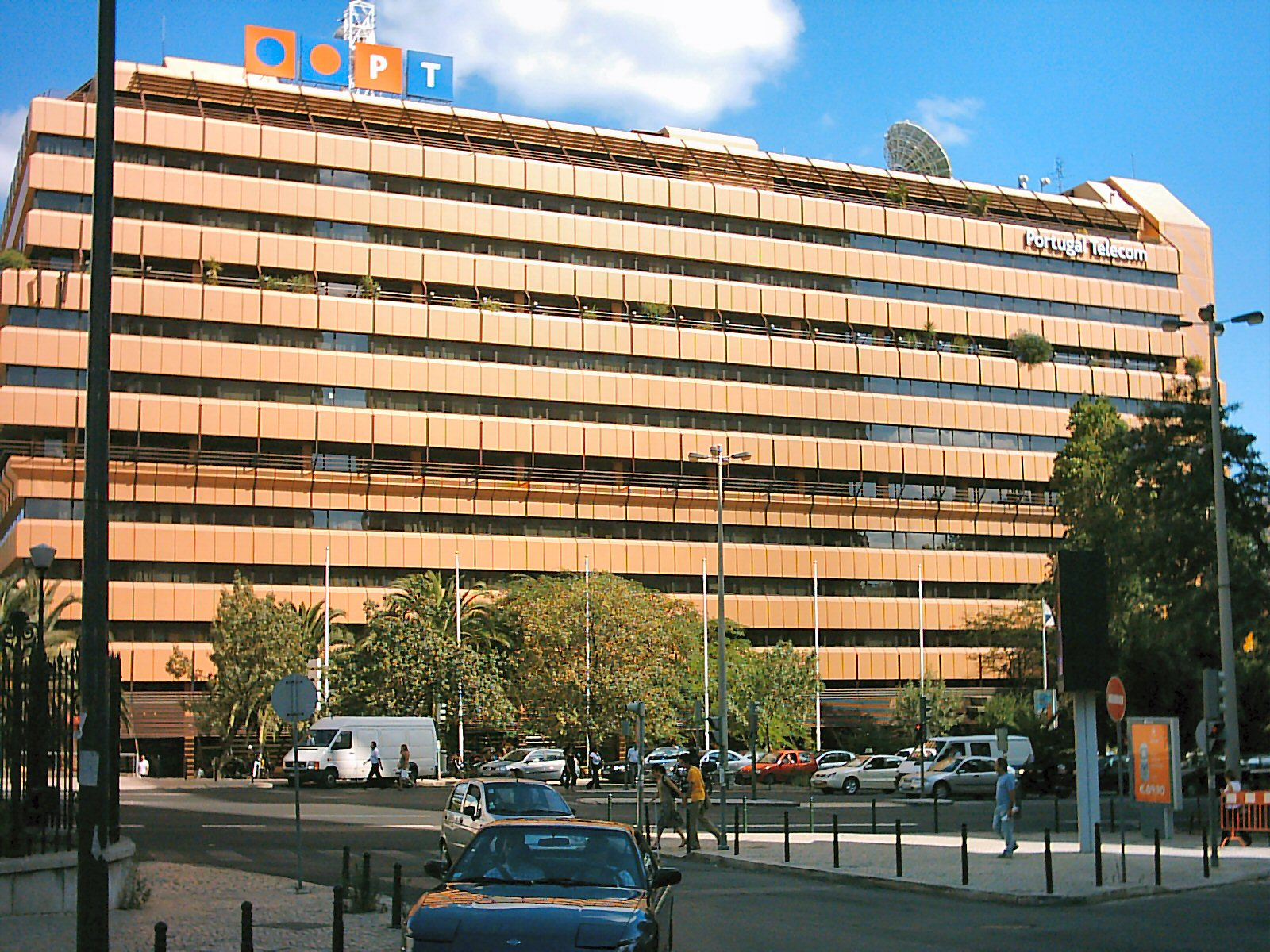
Altice Portugal headquarters in Lisbon since 1994

In early 2007, the Portuguese conglomerate, Sonaecom's takeover offer for PT Portugal failed. PT's board rejected an initial bid, worth EUR 11.1 bn, in February 2006. Sonae.com's takeover bid opposed Belmiro de Azevedo (founder and historical chairman of Sonae holding company) and his son Paulo Azevedo (then the head officer of Sonaecom telecommunications operator) to the investor José Berardo and PT's administrators Zeinal Bava and Henrique Granadeiro. In April 2007 the European Commission gave an ultimatum to the Portuguese government ordering it to give up on the 500 golden shares pack that it owned on the company and that enable special veto powers to the government on vital issues. This could give the government a decisive role in the bid by any company to buy Portugal Telecom. In November 2007, Portugal Telecom spun off its media assets (PT Multimédia), that included TV Cabo and Lusomundo Cinemas, and it changed its name to ZON Multimedia (later by NOS since 2014). In January 2008, the European Commission began legal proceedings against the Portuguese government over its 'golden share' in incumbent telecoms operator Portugal Telecom. The 500 golden shares with extended voting rights, allowing it to block potential takeover bids, were the reason for the commission's legal action. Similarly, in November 2005, the commission had forced the Spanish government to give up its golden share in the other telecommunications' major player in the Iberian Peninsula, the Spanish telecoms giant Telefónica.

In December 2009, Portugal Telecom purchased RETI.

On 2 October 2013 Portugal Telecom and Brazil's Oi said they would combine operations to form a new Brazil-based company with more than 100 million subscribers. The resulting company's provisional name is CorpCo.

On 2 June 2015 Altice announced closing of Portugal Telecom acquisition. Paulo Manuel da Conceição Neves was appointed as CEO.

On March 14, 2018, the PT Group was renamed Altice Portugal.

Altice Portugal's headquarters in Lisbon was raided on July 12, 2023, as part of an investigation into suspected corruption, money laundering, and tax fraud.

At end of January, 2025, it was announced that the name Altice would be removed from the majority of the Portuguese assets, and these would instead adopt the name MEO. While the announcement claimed that the rebrand was done to create better brand synergy, many suspect this was the result of the 2023 corruption scandals and Altice Group's financial problems.

=== CEO ===
Henrique Granadeiro (was previously manager of PT Portugal) was elected president of telecommunications between 2003 and 2008, when she was replaced by Zeinal Bava on March 31, 2008, which went to the board of directors. In August 2014, Zeinal Bava left the CEO of PT Portugal and Granadeiro resigned.

Armando Almeida replaced Zeinal Bava at the helm of Portugal Telecom on 18 August 2014. Zeinal Bava skipped off to Oi in Brazil.

On 21 November 2017 Paulo Neves resigned as CEO and was replaced by Alexandre Filipe Fonseca. In 2022 Ana Figueiredo was appointed as CEO. Armando Pereira was arrested on July 13, 2023 in Lisbon for corruption and money laundering.

== Operations ==
=== Domestic ===
Altice owns MEO, the largest landline operator in Portugal. Its operating brands include MEO, a quadruple play service provider and SAPO, an ISP and producer of web content. Portugal Telecom also owns Altice Labs (formerly known as PT Inovação), an IT services and research and development company; PT Contact, focused in the business of managing contact centres.

Altice Portugal's communications tower is located in Lisbon. It has a height of one hundred meters and is located in the Monsanto Forest Park, at an elevation of 187 meters above sea level, and is used for broadcasting for the entire MEO network. This tower is responsible for receiving TV signals from RTP, SIC and TVI and distributing them to the other Broadcasting Centers scattered throughout the national territory. This Centre also interconnects with the studios of these various operators, forwards TV signals to the studios and sends these signals to the Alfouvar Satellite Station (Sintra).

=== International ===
Brazil was Portugal Telecom's second-largest market. PT agreed to acquire 22.4% of Telemar Norte Leste (Oi), the country's largest telecommunications firm, in July 2010. Separately it also had 29% of UOL, a major Brazil-based ISP and online service provider; and was the sole owner of Dedic, a call centre operator. PT previously held 29.7% of Vivo, the country's largest mobile phone network, which it controlled jointly with Telefónica. It agreed however to sell its stake to Telefónica for €7.5 billion in July 2010.

Portugal Telecom's other main international assets were based in Africa and Asia, largely in Portuguese-speaking nations. Through a 75%-owned investment holding company Africatel, PT had an effective 18.75% of Angola's largest mobile operator Unitel; 30% of Cabo Verde Telecom (CVT) of Cape Verde; 38.25% of Companhia Santomense de Telecomunicações (CST) of São Tomé and Príncipe; and 25.5% of the Namibian mobile firm MTC. The firm sold a 32% shareholding in Méditel of Morocco in September 2009.

In Asia Portugal Telecom owned 41.1% of Timor Telecom of East Timor.

=== ANACOM's responsible for TDT proposals ===
In February 2023, Altice Portugal renewed its membership in ANACOM to guarantee the license of DTT until the year 2030, after announcing in December 2022. The company has already inculcated the RTP, SIC and TVI channels and the ARTV channel.

=== Fights with Media Capital ===
In September 2017, Portugal Telecom at the APDC session (precisely with NOS, Vodafone and RTP) complained about the fights with Media Capital in the purchase of TVI with Altice. The operators, Miguel Almeida from NOS, Claudia from PT Portugal and Mário Vaz from Vodafone made your dominant position between Altice and Media Capital.

=== Innovation at MEO Music ===
In October 2014, the CEO PT, Armando Almeida innovated in the application of MEO Music in the global sector of apps developed by the company. This offer in the session was to be able to win a Spotify streaming platform.

In February 2018, PT Portugal's music service will discontinue MEO Music, which was just approved on February 28, 2018, before the move to Altice Portugal.

=== Frequency changes on terrestrial television ===
In November 2019, Altice will change the frequencies of the terrestrial television pilot to 500 MHz for Portugal based on the Anacom source proposal.

Currently, Altice Portugal's Portuguese terrestrial television network uses broadcasts from location.

=== PT Portugal in the fight soon for SIC and TVI on TDT ===
In November 2015, PT Portugal reached an agreement with the 2015 APDC session, as did Nos and Vodafone, from the regulators of RTP, SIC and TVI. The company regulated the communication groups of RTP, Media Capital or the Portuguese Group Impresa to get the replacement from the telecommunications company. Miguel Almeida, president of NOS agreed to purchase the channel's rights BTV and Sporting TV in the relationship of Portuguese football rights. The communication company's operation was carried out by PT.

== Ownership ==
MEO Portugal S.A. is no longer a publicly traded company, since 100% of its capital is owned by Altice.

As of 15 November 2011 its major stockholders were Espírito Santo Financial Group (11.30%), RS Holding (10.05%), Capital Research and Management (9.97%), Oi;k (7.00%), Caixa Geral de Depósitos (6.23%), Brandes Investment Partners (5.24%) and Norges Bank (5.01%).

After privatization the Portuguese government owned 500 golden shares in PT, which carried special rights over the company's management decisions and blocked any one shareholder from holding more than 10% of voting rights within the company. The golden shares were the subject of a long running dispute between the government and the European Commission, which alleged that their existence was illegal under EU law. Portugal argued that the shares were in the public interest. A case brought before the European Court of Justice by the commission to force the government to cede its shares resulted in the announcement of their abolition in July 2011.

On 2 October 2013 it was reported that Portugal Telecom and Brazil's Oi are to merge to create a Brazil-based company.

Since 2 June 2015 it is a wholly owned subsidiary of Altice, a multinational cable and telecommunications company with a presence in France, Israel, Belgium & Luxembourg, Portugal, French West Indies/Indian Ocean Area and Dominican Republic (“Overseas Territories”) and Switzerland.
