= Isabela Figueiredo =

Portuguese writer (born 1963)

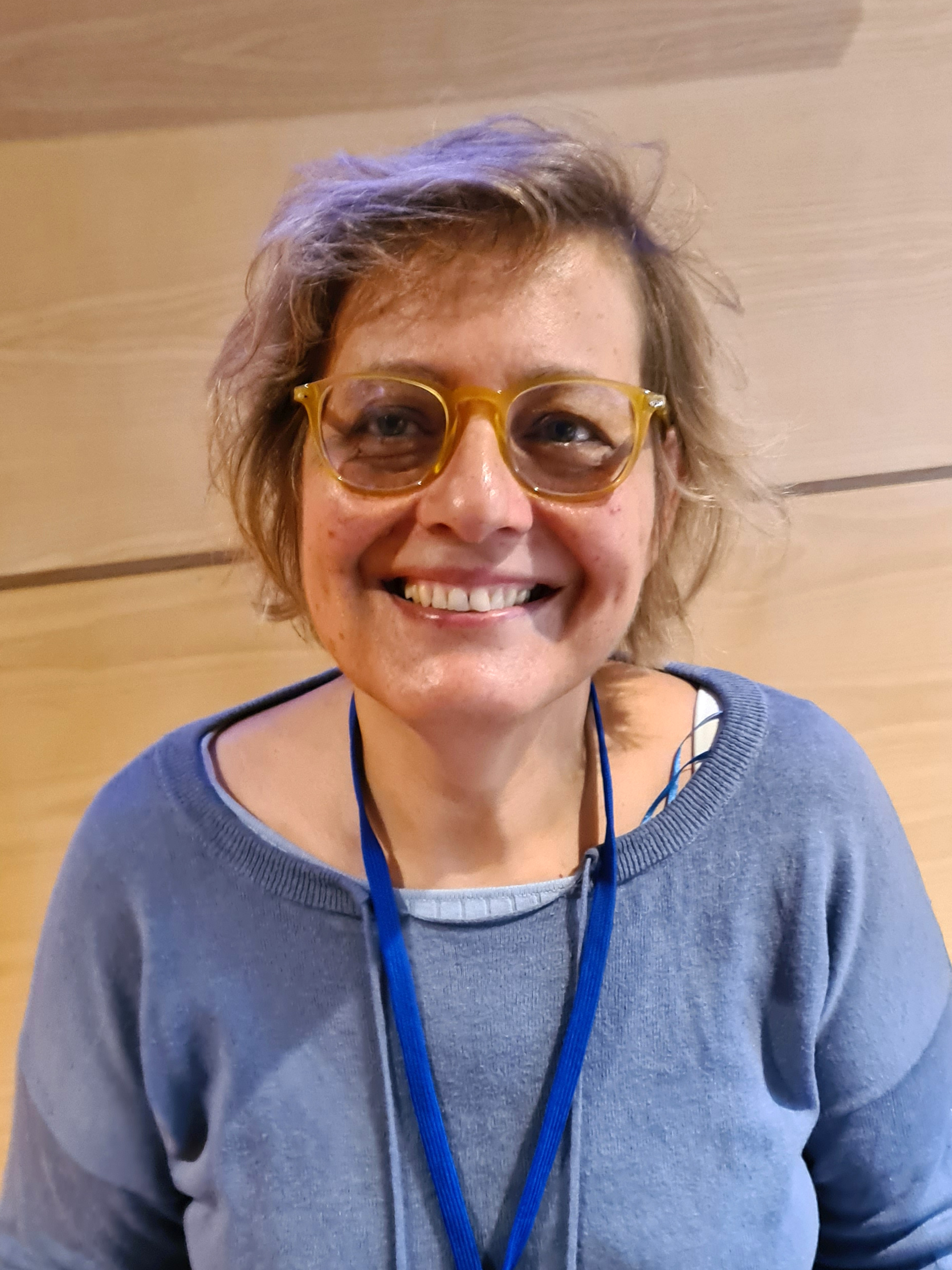

Isabela Figueiredo (Lourenço Marques, January 1, 1963), is a Portuguese journalist, teacher, and writer.

== Biography ==
Isabela Figueiredo was born in Lourenço Marques, Mozambique, and went to Portugal in 1975 as a returnee. She went to live with her grandmother, being separated from her parents, who stayed in Mozambique, for 10 years. Her father was an electrician.

Figueiredo has a degree in Lusophone Languages and Literatures from the Universidade Nova de Lisboa and a specialization in Gender studies from Universidade Aberta de Lisboa. She published her first texts in 1983 in DN Jovem, a now defunct supplement of Diário de Notícias.

In 1988, she won her first prize at the Mostra Portuguesa de Artes e Ideias with a work published under the name Isabel Almeida Santos: Conto é Como Quem Diz . The author worked as a journalist at Diário de Notícias between 1989 and 1994 and also as a high school teacher in Lisbon's South Bank between 1985 and 2014.

In 2009, she published the autobiographical work Caderno de Memórias Coloniais which was elected in 2010 as one of the most relevant works of the decade by the writer Maria da Conceição Caleiro and the essayist Gustavo Rubim in the special published by the culture magazine Ípsilon (arts supplement of the newspaper Público(Portugal) ).

Also in 2010, she received the award for best book of the year with Caderno de Memórias Coloniais. Her novel A Gorda (2016) was considered one of the ten best books of 2016 by the online magazine Espalha-Factos and won the Urbano Tavares Rodrigues Literary Award 2017.

== Works ==
- 2009 – Caderno de Memórias Coloniais, Angelus Novus
- 2016 – A Gorda, Editorial Caminho
- 2022 – Um Cão no Meio do Caminho, Editorial Caminho

== Prizes ==
- 1988 – Award from Mostra Portuguesa de Artes e Ideias
- 2010 – Monster of the Year Award for Best Book, by Angelus Novus
- 2017 – Urbano Tavares Rodrigues Literary Prize
- 2021 – Nomination for the Femina Foreign Prize

== Translations ==
=== United States ===
- "Notebook of Colonial Memories" (University of Massachusetts Dartmouth, 2015; Translated by Anna M. Klobucka and Phillip Rothwell)
