= Golden share =

Special type of company share

In business and finance, a golden share is a type of share of stock that lets its owner outvote all other shareholders in certain circumstances. Golden shares often belong to the government when a government-owned company is undergoing the process of privatization and transformation into a stock company.

== Purpose ==
This share gives the government organization, or other shareholder, the right of decisive vote in a shareholder meeting. Usually this will be implemented through clauses in a company's articles of association, and will be designed to prevent stake-building above a certain percentage ownership level, or to give a government, or other shareholder, veto powers over any major corporate action, such as the sale of a major asset or subsidiary or of the company as a whole.

In the context of government-owned golden shares, this share is usually reserved for companies whose business is deemed to be of ongoing importance to national interests, for example for reasons of national security.

== History ==
The term arose in the 1980s when the British government retained golden shares in companies it privatised, an approach later taken in many other European countries, as well as Russia, where it was introduced by a Decree of the President of the Russian Federation (Boris Yeltsin) on November 16, 1992.

As of 2014, NATS Holdings, the UK's main air navigation service provider, is an example of a company with a golden share.

The government of Brazil has been holding a golden share in aircraft manufacturer Embraer to retain veto power over "strategic decisions involving military programs and any change in its controlling interest."

The June 2025 acquisition of U.S. Steel by Nippon Steel involved the use of a golden share, giving President Donald Trump extensive control over the company. In January of that year, President Joe Biden had blocked the deal, citing national security concerns. The president of the United Steelworkers union called the golden share "a startling degree of personal power over a corporation". According to filings control of Trump's golden share reverts to the U.S. Treasury Department and the U.S. Commerce Department following his presidency.

=== People's Republic of China ===
In 2013, the People's Republic of China introduced golden shares termed "special management shares". Such shares confer distinct benefits like greater voting rights or governance powers.Since then, they have been utilized by Chinese Communist Party (CCP) general secretary Xi Jinping's administration to expand control over private companies, particularly technology companies. Golden shares have featured prominently in the governance of digital platforms, which accepted this arrangement in exchange for journalism licenses required for their daily operations. During the 2020–2021 Xi Jinping administration reform spree, the government used strategic share acquisitions to increase its golden share holdings.In 2021, The Economist and Reuters described the Chinese government's stake in ByteDance as a golden share investment.

=== Legal challenges ===
The British government's golden share in BAA, the UK airports authority, was ruled illegal by European courts in 2003, when it was deemed contradictory to the principle of free circulation of capital within the European Union. The European Court of Justice also held that Portugal's holding of golden shares in Energias de Portugal is contrary to European Union law since it presented an unjustified restriction on free movement of capital.

Other golden shares ruled illegal include the Spanish government's golden shares in Telefónica, Repsol YPF, Endesa, Argentaria and Tabacalera.

The golden share structure of Volkswagen AG and the travails of the German Land (federal state) of Niedersachsen (Lower Saxony) are discussed by Johannes Adolff as well by as Peer Zumbansen and Daniel Saam.
