= Oni Telecom =

- Industry: ICT
- Founded: 1998; 28 years ago
- Headquarters: Rua 3 da Matinha, 2º Piso, Edifício Altejo - Lisboa 1950-326 - Portugal
- Key people: Víctor Guerrero (CEO)
- Products: Communications, IT & Cloud and ICT Integration
- Owner: Gigas
- Website: https://www.oni.pt

ONI is a Portuguese telecommunications company that operates exclusively in the business-to-business market; its clients are Portuguese companies, public entities and international telecommunication companies.

The main services that ONI provides are: Communications (private networks, internet, fixed and mobile voice), IT (Data Center, Cloud, Electronic and Physical Security).

ONI´s shareholders until November 2020 were Apax France and Fortino Capital since September 2015. These groups owned Nowo, a Portuguese telecommunications company that operates in the residential market before selling it to Digi Communications in 2024.

== History ==
Oni Telecom

Oni was founded in 1998 and owes its creation to the liberalization of the Portuguese telecommunications market. The original shareholders were the four biggest national economic groups – EDP, Millennium BCP, Brisa and Galp Energia. During its first 4 years of activity, ONI operated not only in the business-to-business market but also in the business-to-consumer market.

Oni is deeply connected to the onset of the Next Generation Networks (NGN) in Portugal, which had a big boost in 2009. These networks proved to be fundamental in meeting the needs of corporate customers and, since then, Oni has been exploring its own NGN.

In 2008 Oni was completely acquired by The Riverside Company and Gestmin, leaving its position as a generalist operator to exclusively focus in the corporate and operator segments. Since then, the company operates under the brand Oni Communications.

In August 2013, its total capital was acquired by Altice, and in September 2015 was sold to Apax France and Fortino Capital before being sold to Spanish technology company Gigas in November 2020.

=== Chronology ===
1998: 1st telecommunications company after market liberalization; 1st redundant SDH network in Portugal

1999: 1st Multi-Services ATM and IP network in Portugal

Oni Telecom

2000: 1st new operator offering direct access;1st Multi-Services IP-MPLS network in Portugal

2001: Integration of Brisatel and Comnexo´s network

2002: Oni captures 40% of the market share lost by the incumbent operator;1st Metro-Ethernet of client in Portugal

2003: 1st operator with a public VoIP Gateway

2004: 1st telephone service offer without signature of telephone line;1st bundled voice and Internet offering

2005: 1st commercial offer of access to the electric network: powerline.

2007: Oni is acquired by The Riverside Company and Gestmin and focus exclusively on the Corporate, Government and Carriers markets. Sells portfolio of residential and SoHo clients

2008: One of the first new operators to achieve the break-even.

2009: First Portuguese operator to present to the Portuguese Government an investment program for NGN (New Generation Networks); Opening of the Next Generation Operation Center.

2012: Launch of the first Enterprise Cloud offer.

2014: Launch of the IP Centrex offer; Launch of service Bundles targeted to the SME (PME in Portuguese) market (PME MAX BUSINESS; PME MAX VOICE and PME MAX DUO).

2015: Launch of a new offer targeted to the SME market (PME MAX NET).

2016: Launch of the first ONI´s mobile offer – Enterprise Mobile, Launch of offer SMS broadcast (ONI SMS).
