= Figueiredo (Braga) =

- Civil parish
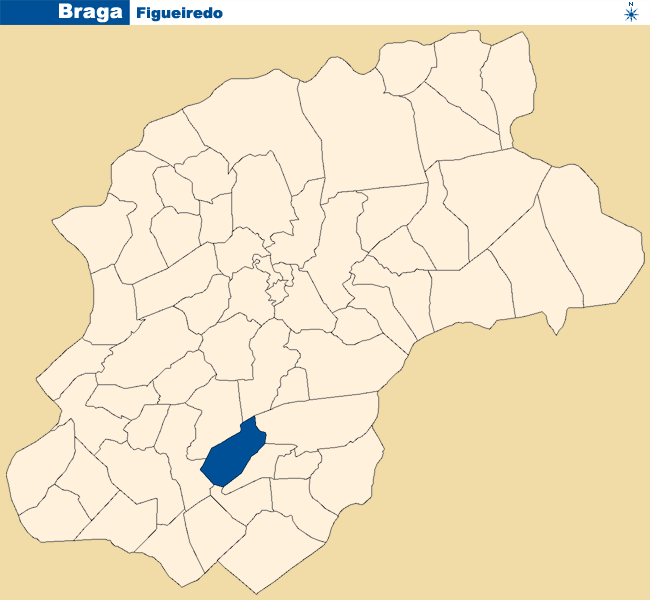
- Coordinates: 41.632°N 8.337°W
- Country: Portugal
- Region: Norte
- Intermunic. comm.: Cávado
- District: Braga
- Municipality: Braga

Area
  - Total: 2.03 km^{2} (0.78 sq mi)

Population (2011)
  - Total: 1,198
  - Density: 590/km^{2} (1,500/sq mi)
- Time zone: UTC+00:00 (WET)
  - Summer (DST): UTC+01:00 (WEST)

Figueiredo is a Portuguese parish, located in the municipality of Braga. The population in 2011 was 1,198, in an area of 2.03 km^{2}.

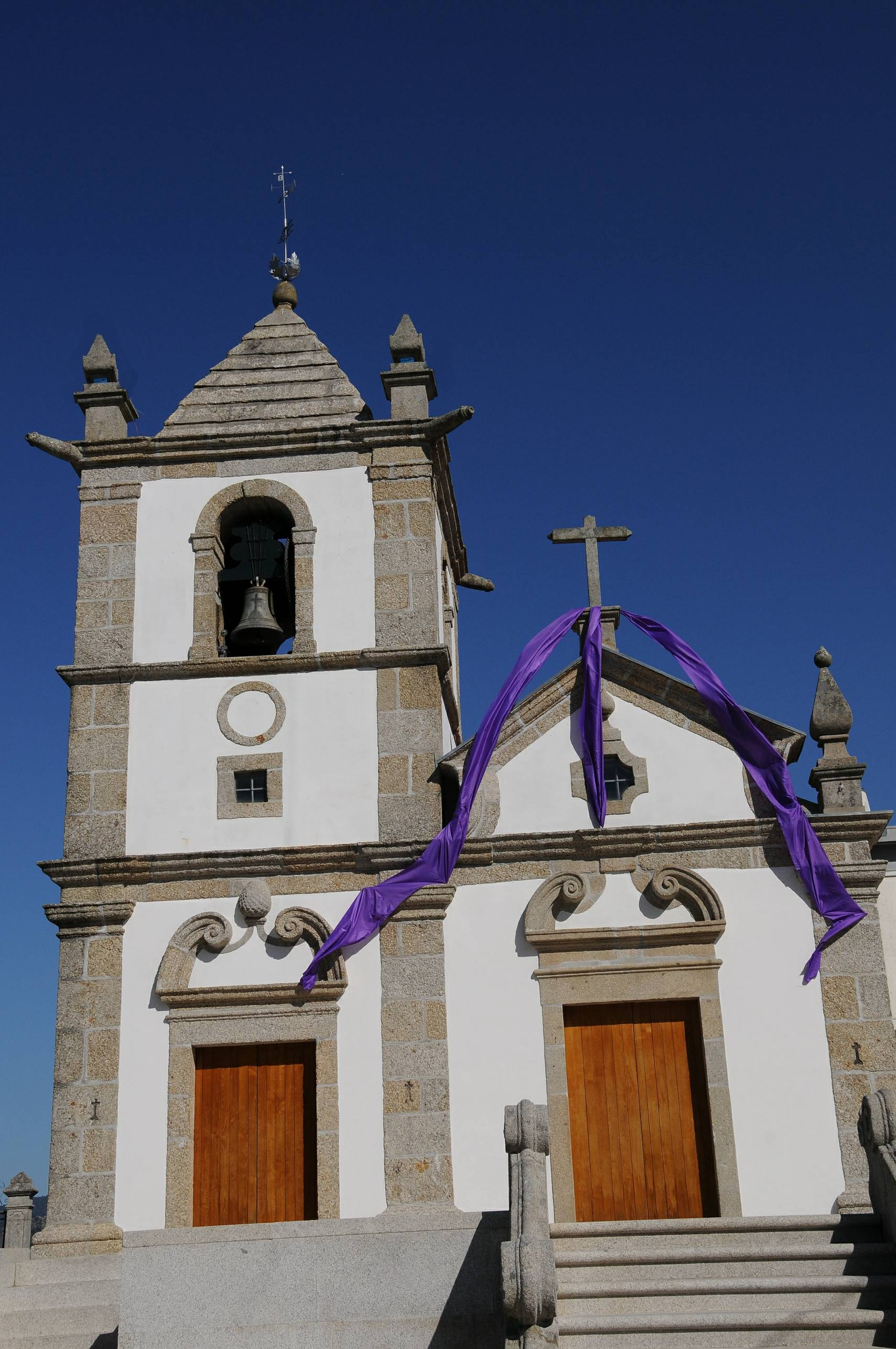
Figueiredo Church
