= Ana Figueiredo =

Portuguese business executive

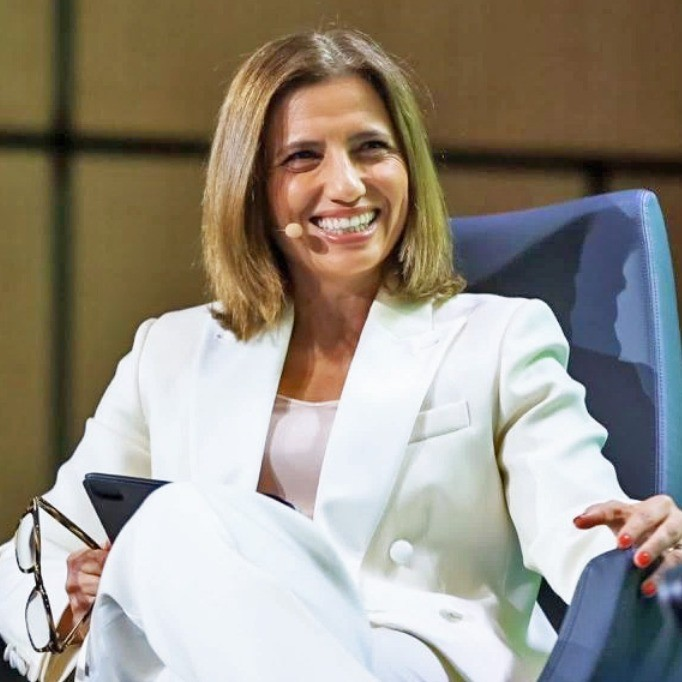
- Figueiredo in 2024
- Born: 1974 (age 51–52); Lisbon, Portugal
- Education: MBA
- Alma mater: Instituto Superior de Economia e Gestão (ISEG); Catholic University of Portugal
- Known for: CEO of Altice Portugal

Ana Figueiredo (born 1974) is a Portuguese business executive who is the CEO of Altice Portugal, the largest telecommunications service provider in Portugal, formerly known as Portugal Telecom.

== Early life and education ==
Figueiredo was born in Lisbon in 1974 and lived for a time in Estoril before moving with her family to the Lisbon suburb of Benfica so that her mother could be closer to her parents, who had health problems. Her maternal grandfather had lost his hearing and she has said that she learned to read and write early to communicate with him. She attended the Beiral school in Benfica and then went to the Instituto Superior de Economia e Gestão (ISEG), part of the University of Lisbon, where she obtained a degree in Business Administration and Management, following this with an MBA from the Catholic University of Portugal and Nova School of Business and Economics.

== Career ==
Figueiredo began her career as an auditor at Galp Energia, a Portugal-based, multinational energy corporation, and then moved to Ernst & Young, a major international accounting firm. In 2003 she joined Portugal Telecom, which since 2015 has been the fully owned subsidiary of the French multinational Altice, the owner of the MEO brand in Portugal. Between 2016 and 2018, she served as Executive Audit Director of the Altice Group in Switzerland, overseeing operations in France, the United States, Israel, Portugal, and the Dominican Republic. In 2018, she became CEO of Altice Dominicana S.A., the first woman to head a telecommunications company in the country. There she was responsible for the strategic and operational restructuring of the company. She was appointed CEO of Altice Portugal in April 2022. That year the company had a turnover of around €3 billion.

== Awards ==
In 2023 Figueiredo was ranked by Forbes magazine as the 7th most powerful businesswoman in Portugal, and the most powerful in the telecommunications sector.

== Controversy ==
A year after Figueiredo took on her role as CEO, the offices of Altice Portugal were raided by the police following the opening of a preliminary investigation by the French authorities into possible cases of corruption and money laundering in the Altice group worldwide. The police operation, known as Operação Picoas, followed the arrest in 2022 of Altice co-founder Armando Pereira and his business partner Hernâni Antunes. No blame was being attached to Figueiredo, however, who saw her role as being to restore the reputation of the company.

== See also ==
- Altice Portugal
