= List of Alpha Kappa Psi members =

Alpha Kappa Psi is a professional fraternity for business. It was founded in 1904 at New York University. Following is a list of some of the notable members of Alpha Kappa Psi.

== Academia ==
=== Presidents and chancellors ===
- John S. Allen (Alpha Phi '54 honorary), president of University of Florida (1953–1955) Founding president of University of South Florida (1957–1970)
- Harmon W. Caldwell, president of University of Georgia (1935–1938), Chancellor University System of Georgia (1938–1964)
- Harwell Davis, president of Samford University
- Arthur Edens, president of Duke University (1949–1960)
- Elmer Ellis, president of University of Missouri (1954–1963), and University of Missouri System (1963–1966)
- David Friday, president of Michigan State University (1922–1923)
- Franklin Harris, president of Brigham Young University and Utah State University
- John Hitt, president of University of Central Florida (1992–2018)
- Stephen Horn, president of California State University Long Beach
- David Kinley, president of University of Illinois
- Deane W. Malott (Psi), chancellor of the University of Kansas (1939–1951) and president of Cornell University (1951–1963)
- C. Peter Magrath, president of University of Minnesota (1974–1984), president of University of Missouri System (1985–1991), president West Virginia University (2008–2009)
- Cloyd Marvin, president of George Washington University (1927–1959) and University of Arizona (1922–1927)
- Alan G. Merten (Alpha Phi, 1987 faculty), president of George Mason University (1996–2012), dean of Samuel Curtis Johnson Graduate School of Management, Cornell University (1989–1996), dean of Warrington College of Business, University of Florida (1986–89)
- Tim Miller (Eta Iota), president of Murray State University (2013–2014)
- Malcolm Moos, president of University of Minnesota (1967–1974)
- David W. Mullins, president of University of Arkansas
- Carroll Newsom, president of New York University (1956–1962)
- Robert A. Plane, president of Clarkson University (1974–1985), and Wells College (1991–1995)
- J. Wayne Reitz (Alpha Phi 1960 honorary), president of University of Florida (1955–1967)
- Herman Schneider, president of the University of Cincinnati (1929–1932), founder of cooperative education
- Beheruz Sethna (Delta Chi 1984 faculty) president of University of West Georgia
- Donna Shalala (Beta Pi), president of University of Miami (2001–2015), chancellor of University of Wisconsin–Madison (1987–1993), president of Hunter College (1980–1988), president of The New School and University of Miami; U.S. House of Representatives
- Elvis Stahr, president of Indiana University Bloomington
- Henry King Stanford (Beta 1948), president of University of Georgia (1986–87), University of Miami (1962–1981), and Birmingham-Southern College (1957–1962)
- Charles Steger, president of Virginia Tech (2000–2014)
- Beheruz Sethna, president of University of West Georgia (1994–2013)
- Norman Topping, president of University of Southern California (1958–1970)
- Paul Torgersen, president of Virginia Tech (1994–2000)
- Herman B Wells, president of Indiana University
- Charles E. Young, chancellor of University of California Los Angeles

=== Professors ===
- Doak S. Campbell, president of Florida State University
- David Dodd, economist at the Columbia Business School
- George Kozmetsky, dean of the University of Texas College of Business Administration (now the McCombs School of Business)
- Richard E. Sorensen (Kappa Chi 1981 faculty), professor emeritus at Virginia Tech; dean of the Pamplin College of Business at Virginia Tech and Appalachian State University’s business school

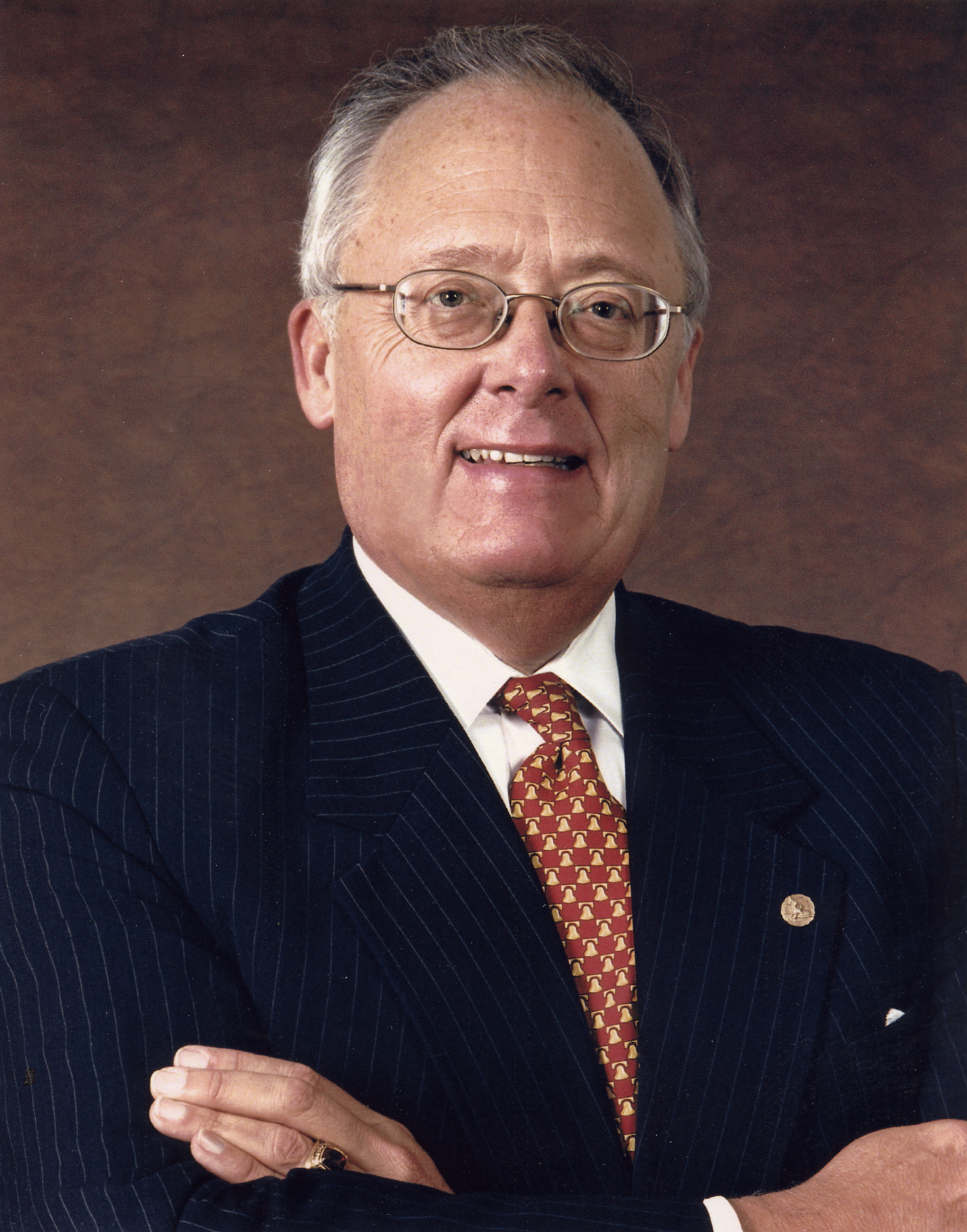
Edwin Feulner

=== Other ===
- Edwin Feulner (Gamma Sigma) former president of The Heritage Foundation
- William A. Scroggs (Tau) Founder, Kappa Kappa Psi National honorary Band Fraternity

== Business ==
- William M. Allen (Rho), president of Boeing from 1945 to 1970; chairman from 1970 to 1972
- Arthur E. Andersen (Gamma), founder of Arthur Andersen
- Elmer L. Andersen, president of HB Fuller Company
- J. Paul Austin (Atlanta Alumni), president of Coca-Cola from 1962 to 1971; chairman from 1970 to 1981
- Cheryl Bachelder (Beta Gamma 1976), CEO of Popeyes Louisiana Kitchen from 2007–2017; President of KFC 2001–2003
- Murray M. Baker (Gamma Theta), president of Caterpillar Inc.
- Ronald Batory (Eta Pi), president and CEO pf Consolidated Rail Corporation (Conrail)
- Robert M. Beall II (Alpha Phi 1965), chairman and former CEO, Bealls (Florida)
- Roger Blough (Epsilon Rho), chairman and CEO of U.S. Steel
- Harry A. Bullis (Alpha Eta), chairman of the board of General Mills
- Thomas E. Burnett Jr. (Alpha Eta 1985), vice-president and chief operating officer of Thoratec Corporation, Passenger on United Airlines Flight 93
- Harlow H. Curtice (Phi), president of General Motors from 1953 to 1958
- Frederic G. Donner (Phi). chairman of the board of General Motors from 1958 to 1967
- Donald Wills Douglas Jr. (Alpha Upsilon), president of Douglas Aircraft Corporation; silver medalist in the 1932 Summer Olympics
- Leonard Firestone (Alpha Zeta), president of Firestone Tire and Rubber Company and United States Ambassador to Belgium
- Joe T. Ford (Beta Zeta), co-founder, former CEO, and current chairman, Alltel
- Edwin H. Gott (Alpha Sigma), President of U.S. Steel
- Joyce C. Hall (Psi), founder of Hallmark Cards
- Lee Iacocca, president of Chrysler Corporation
- Norman R. Klug (Alpha Psi), president of Miller Brewing
- David S. Lewis Jr. (Alpha Lambda), president of McDonnell Aircraft from 1962 to 1967; chairman and CEO of General Dynamics from 1971 to 1985
- Bernie Marcus, founder of The Home Depot
- J. Willard Marriott (Beta Mu), founder of Marriott International
- William McChesney Martin Jr. (Beta Mu 1957 honorary), Federal Reserve Board Chairman
- Theodore M. McCarty (Eta), CEO of Gibson Guitars from 1948 to 1966
- Arjay Miller (Phi), president of Ford Motor Company and dean of the Stanford Graduate School of Business
- James Cash Penney (Upsilon), founder, president, and chairman of J. C. Penney
- T. Boone Pickens (Eta Theta) chairman of BP Capital Management, philanthropist, and alternative energy advocate
- George W. Romney (Phi 1963 honorary), chairman of the board and president of American Motors Corporation (1954–1962)
- Edward B. Rust Jr. (Delta Psi 1970), president and CEO of State Farm from 1985–2015
- James A. Ryder (Beta Pi), founder of Ryder
- Robert F. Six (Beta), founder and CEO of Continental Airlines from 1936 to 1981
- Lynn A. Townsend (Eta Nu), president, chairman, and chief executive of the Chrysler Corporation
- E. Gifford Upjohn (Gamma Tau), president of Upjohn Company
- Dwane L. Wallace (Gamma Upsilon), president and chairman of the board of the Cessna Aircraft Company from 1936 to 1975
- Sam Walton (Beta Zeta), founder of Walmart
- Leslie B. Worthington (Epsilon), president of U.S. Steel

== Entertainment ==
- David Hartman (Beta Eta), original host of Good Morning America
- Errol Barnett (Alpha Upsilon), anchor and correspondent for CNN International
- Phaedra Parks (Nu Omega), reality television star, The Real Housewives of Atlanta

== Law ==
- J. Lindsay Almond (Beta Xi 1960 honorary), Senior Judge of the United States Court of Appeals for the Federal Circuit, U.S. Representative from Virginia
- Barry Anderson (Epsilon Xi 1974), associate justice of Minnesota Supreme Court (2004–2024)
- Thomas F. Eagleton (Upsilon 1967 honorary), Attorney General of Missouri (1961–1965)
- Frank J. Kelley, Michigan Attorney General (1961–1998)
- James Kenneth Logan (Psi 1950) judge of U.S. Court of Appeals for the 10th Circuit (1977–1994)
- William G. Milliken (Motor City Alumni), justice of the Michigan Supreme Court
- Ben Overton (Alpha Phi 1948), justice of the Supreme Court of Florida (1974–1999)
- G. Mennen Williams (Epsilon Zeta 1966 honorary), chief justice of the Michigan Supreme Court; Assistant Secretary of State for African Affairs

== Literature and journalism ==
- Steve' Forbes (Psi Chi 1989 honorary) editor-in-chief, Forbes magazine

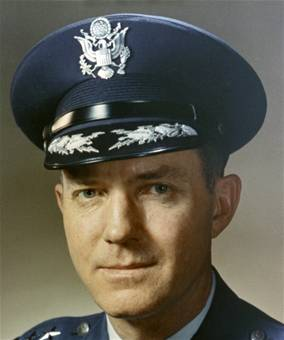
Samuel C. Phillips

== Military ==
- Samuel C. Phillips (Upsilon 1966 honorary) United States Air Force general and Director of Project Apollo (1964–1969); director of the National Security Agency
- Edward V. Rickenbacker (Milwaukee Alumni), World War I flying ace

== Politics ==
=== Presidents and prime ministers ===
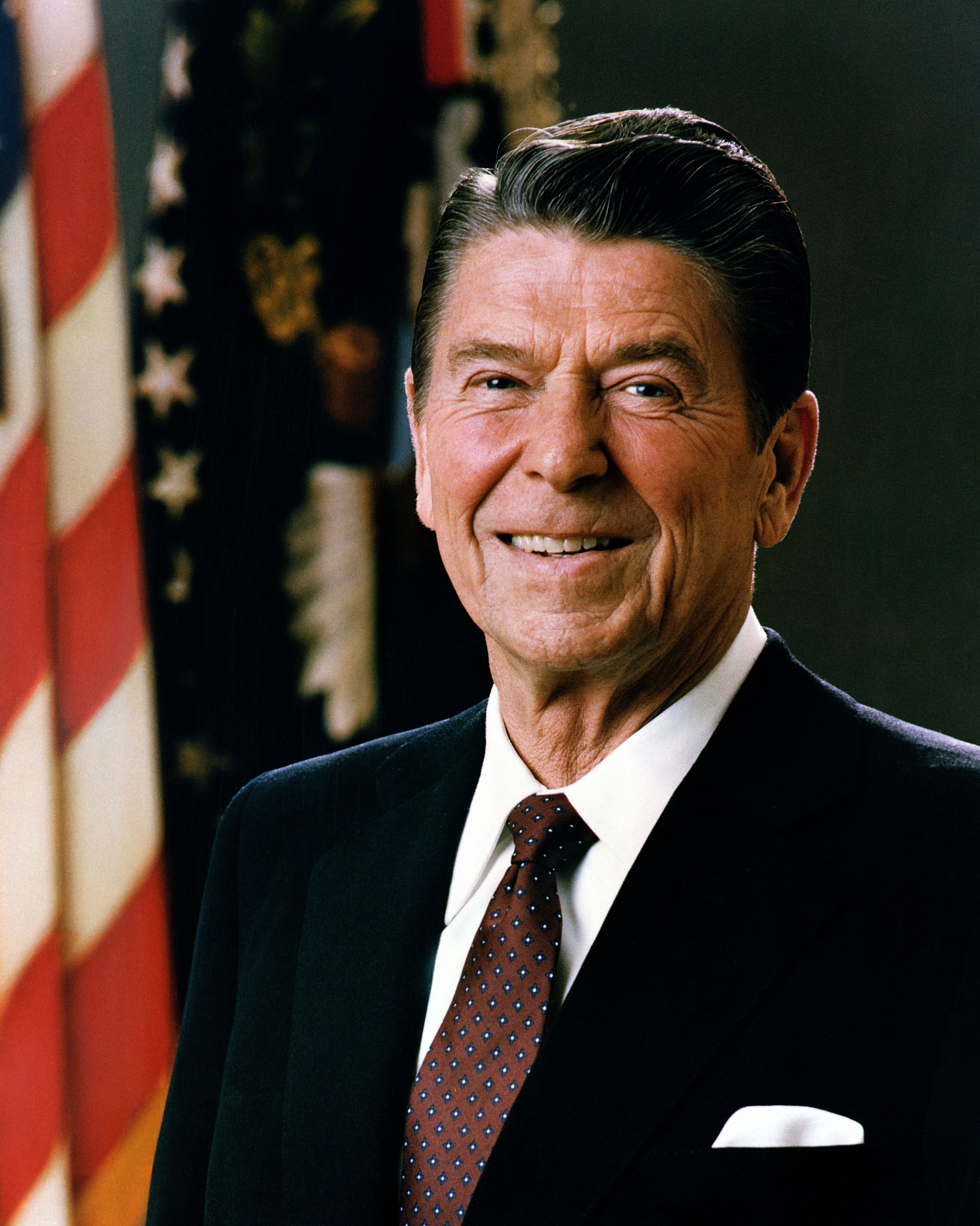
Ronald Reagan

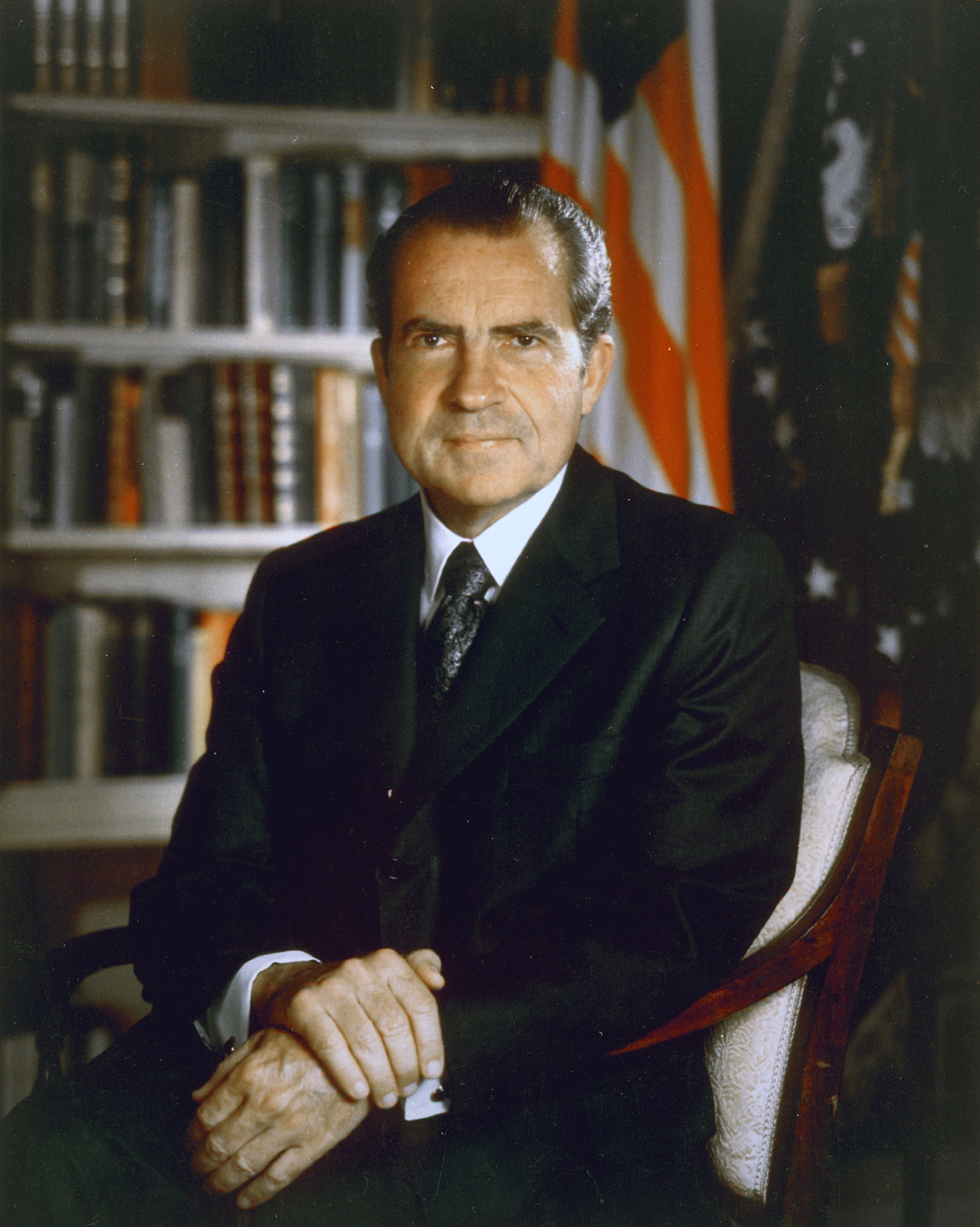
Richard Nixon

- Benazir Bhutto (Xi Chi 1997, honorary), Prime Minister of Pakistan (1988–1990; 1993–1996)
- Richard Nixon (Beta Omicron 1960 honorary), President of the United States, Vice President of the United States, United States Senate
- Ronald Reagan (Alpha Zeta 1963 honorary), President of the United States, Governor of California, actor

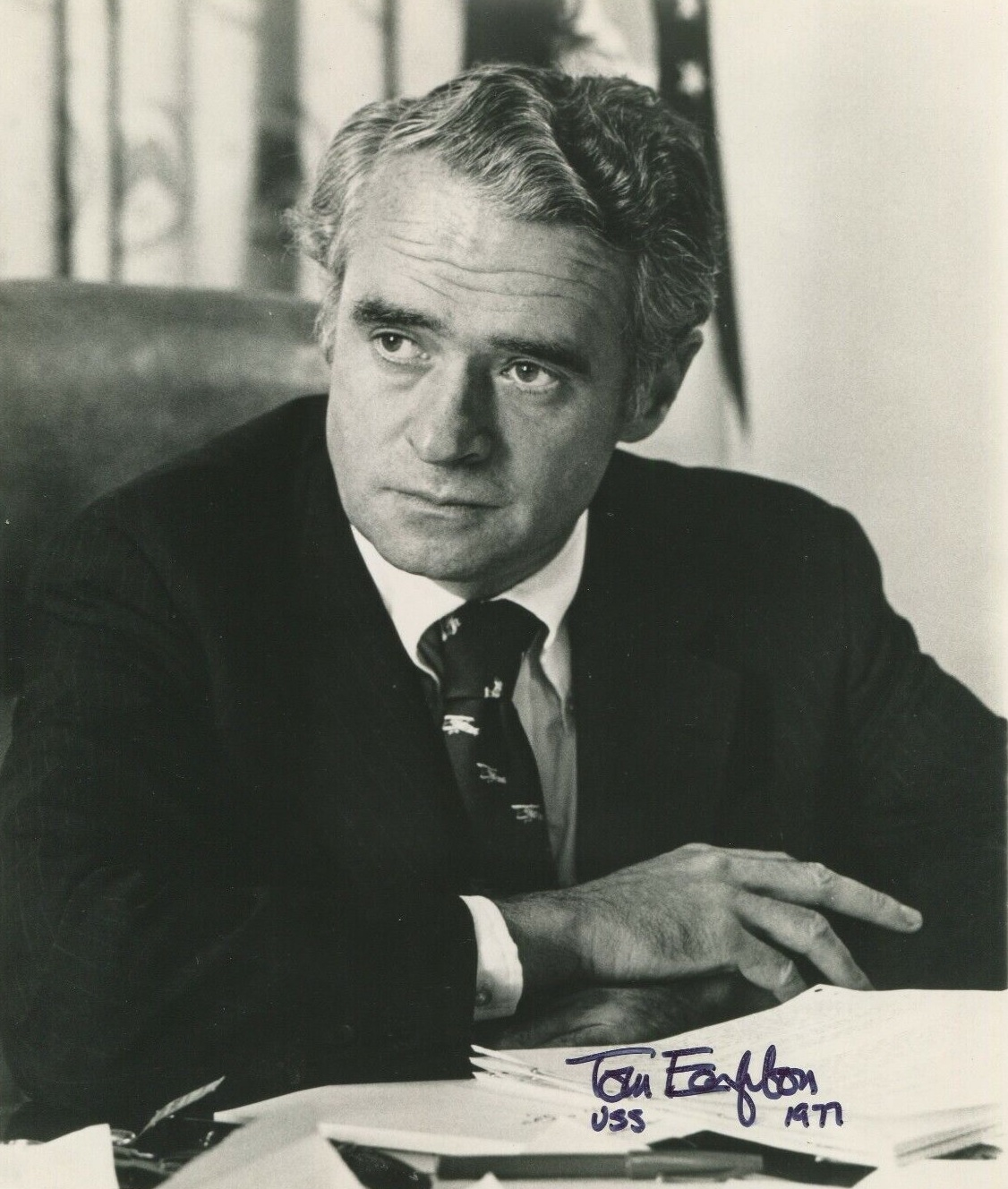
Thomas Eagleton

=== U.S. Congress ===
- Bill Bradley, U.S. Senate, professional basketball player
- Harry Darby (Psi 1950 honorary), U.S. Senator from Kansas
- Harold Daub (Alpha Lambda 1962), U.S. Representative from Nebraska, 2nd District
- Paul H. Douglas (Epsilon 1917 faculty), U.S. Senator from Illinois
- Thomas F. Eagleton (Upsilon 1967 honorary), U.S. Senator from Missouri. Lt. Governor of Missouri
- Michael B. Enzi (Beta Mu 1964), U.S. Senator from Wyoming
- Barry M. Goldwater (Beta Mu 1963 honorary), U.S. Senator from Arizona
- Robert P. Griffin (Epsilon Zeta 1967 honorary), U.S. Senator from Michigan, U.S. House of Representatives, Justice of the Michigan Supreme Court
- Edward J. Gurney (Alpha Phi 1968 honorary), U.S. Senator from Florida, U.S. Representative from Florida
- Kent Hance (Eta Theta 1969 faculty), U.S. Representative from Texas; Chancellor of the Texas Tech University System
- Henry M. Jackson (Rho 1970 honorary), United States Senator, U.S. House of Representatives, chairman of the Democratic National Committee
- Sam Johnson (Alpha Pi), U.S. Representative from Texas, 3rd District
- Richard Lugar (Hoosier Alumni 1968 honorary), U.S. Senator from Indiana
- John L. McClellan (Epsilon Omicron '64 honorary), U.S. Senator from Arkansas, U.S. Representative from Arkansas
- Joseph M. Montoya (Beta Tau 1964 honorary), U.S. Senator from New Mexico, U.S. Representative from New Mexico, Lt. Governor of New Mexico
- Randy Neugebauer (Eta Theta), U.S. Representative from Texas, 19th District
- John C. Stennis (Delta Lambda 1966 honorary), U.S. Senator from Mississippi, President Pro Tempore (1987–1989)
- W. Stuart Symington (Delta Sigma 1964 honorary), United States Secretary of the Air Force. U.S. Senator from Missouri
- John G. Tower (Epsilon Eta 1961 honorary), U.S. Senator from Texas
- William B. Umstead (Alpha Tau 1953 honorary), U.S. Senator, U.S. Representative from North Carolina
- Arthur Walsh (Alpha 1935), U.S. Senator from New Jersey
- Kenneth Wherry (Xi 1916), U.S. Senator from Nebraska, Senate Majority/Minority Whip, Senate Minority Leader
- Alexander Wiley (Delta Phi 1962 honorary), U.S. Senator from Wisconsin
- Ralph W. Yarborough (Beta Tau 1968 honorary), U.S. Senator from Texas

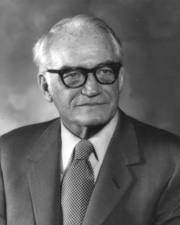
Barry Goldwate

=== U.S. Cabinet ===
- Lamar Alexander (Delta Kappa 1980 honorary), United States Secretary of Education, U.S. Senator from Tennessee, Governor of Tennessee
- Robert H. Charles (Upsilon), Assistant Secretary of the Air Force (1964–68)
- Walter Heller, (Alpha Eta 1947 faculty), 5th chair of the Council of Economic Advisers
- Luther H. Hodges (Alpha Tau 1956 honorary), United States Secretary of Commerce, Governor of North Carolina, Lieutenant Governor of North Carolina
- Robert S. McNamara (Phi 1960 honorary), U.S. Secretary of Defense, president of the Ford Motor Company; president of the World Bank Group (1968–1981)
- L. Glenn Perry (Epsilon Lambda 1965), chief accountant of the United States Securities and Exchange Commission
- George W. Romney (Phi 1963 honorary), U.S. Secretary of Housing and Urban Development, Governor of Michigan
- Daniel C. Roper (Beta Eta 1934 honorary), United States Secretary of Commerce, U.S. Ambassador to Canada (1939)
- Donna Shalala (Beta Pi), U.S. Secretary of Health and Human Services
- C. R. Smith (Iota 1924), United States Secretary of Commerce; CEO of American Airlines from 1934 to 1968 and from 1973 to 1974

=== Governors and lieutenant governors ===
- Thomas Burton Adams Jr., Lt. Governor of Florida, Secretary of State of Florida, Florida Senate
- J. Lindsay Almond (Beta Xi 1960 honorary), Governor of Virginia; senior Judge of the United States Court of Appeals for the Federal Circuit
- John Anderson Jr. (Psi), Governor of Kansas, Kansas Attorney General, Kansas Senate
- Elmer L. Andersen (Alpha Eta), Governor of Minnesota, Minnesota Senate
- William H. Avery (Alpha Omega 1965 honorary), Governor of Kansas, U.S. House of Representatives
- Carl E. Bailey (Beta Zeta 1940 honorary), Governor of Arkansas, Attorney General of Arkansas
- Frank A. Barrett (Beta Nu 1952 honorary), Governor of Wyoming, United States Senator, U.S. House of Representatives
- C. Farris Bryant (Alpha Phi 1933), Governor of Florida, Speaker of the Florida House of Representatives
- W. Haydon Burns (Jacksonville Alumni 1962, honorary), Governor of Florida, Mayor of Jacksonville
- Millard F. Caldwell (Alpha Phi 1953 honorary), Governor of Florida; U.S. House of Representatives; Chief Justice of the Florida Supreme Court
- LeRoy Collins (Beta Psi 1957 honorary), Governor of Florida, Florida Senate, Florida House of Representatives
- Buford Ellington (Delta Kappa), Governor of Tennessee
- Mark O. Hatfield (Kappa 1965 honorary), Governor of Oregon, United States Senator
- Warren E. Hearnes (Delta Sigma), Governor of Missouri, Secretary of State of Missouri, Missouri House of Representatives
- Otto Kerner Jr. (Epsilon 1962 honorary), Governor of Illinois; judge of the United States Court of Appeals for the Seventh Circuit
- F. Ray Keyser Jr. (Gamma Omicron), Governor of Vermont, Speaker of the Vermont House of Representatives
- Goodwin J. Knight (Alpha Zeta 1957 honorary), Governor of California, Lieutenant Governor of California
- Warren P. Knowles (Alpha Mu), Governor of Wisconsin, Lieutenant Governor of Wisconsin, Wisconsin Senate
- John Arthur Love (Gamma Zeta), Governor of Colorado
- Clarence W. Meadows (Alpha Delta 1923), Governor of West Virginia, Attorney General of West Virginia
- Wayne Mixson (Alpha Phi 1947), Governor of Florida, Lt. Governor of Florida, Florida House of Representatives
- Val Peterson (Zeta 1949 honorary), Governor of Nebraska, United States Ambassador to Finland, United States Ambassador to Denmark, director of the Federal Civil Defense Administration.
- Cal Rampton (Alpha Theta), Governor of Utah
- Robert D. Ray (Beta Phi), Governor of Iowa, President of Drake University
- Leverett A. Saltonstall (Gamma Nu), Governor of Massachusetts, United States Senator
- Carl E. Sanders (Atlanta Alumni), Governor of Georgia, Georgia State Senate, Georgia House of Representatives
- Preston E. Smith (Eta Theta), Governor of Texas, Lieutenant Governor of Texas, Texas Senate, Texas House of Representatives
- Harold E. Stassen (Alpha Eta 1958 honorary), Governor of Minnesota; President of the University of Pennsylvania
- William G. Stratton (Delta Psi 1960 honorary), Governor of Illinois, U.S. House of Representatives
- John B. Swainson (Eta Zeta), Governor of Michigan, Lieutenant Governor of Michigan, Justice of the Michigan Supreme Court
- Herman E. Talmadge (Pi 1954 honorary), Governor of Georgia, United States Senator
- Vernon W. Thomson (Alpha Mu 1958 honorary), Governor of Wisconsin, U.S. House of Representatives, Attorney General of Wisconsin
- William B. Umstead (Alpha Tau 1953 honorary), Governor of North Carolina, U.S. House of Representatives
- S. Ernest Vandiver (Pi), Governor of Georgia, Lieutenant Governor of Georgia
- G. Mennen Williams (Epsilon Zeta 1966 honorary), Governor of Michigan, chief justice of the Michigan Supreme Court, U.S. Ambassador to the Philippines

=== State legislators and leaders ===
- Thomas Burton Adams Jr., Florida Senate (1956–1960); Secretary of State of Florida
- Elmer L. Andersen (Alpha Eta), Minnesota Senate (1949–1959)
- James Antonio (Upsilon), State Auditor of Missouri, 1978–1984
- Frank A. Barrett (Beta Nu 1952 honorary), Wyoming Senate (1933–1935)
- C. Farris Bryant (Alpha Phi 1933), Florida House of Representatives (1942, 1946–1956); Speaker of the Florida House of Representatives (1953–1954)
- Millard F. Caldwell (Alpha Phi 1953 honorary), Florida House of Representatives (1929–1932)
- LeRoy Collins (Beta Psi 1957 honorary), Florida Senate, Florida House of Representatives
- Michael B. Enzi (Beta Mu 1964), Wyoming Senate (1991–1997)
- Robert D. Fleming, Pennsylvania House of Representatives (1938–1950); Pennsylvania State Senate (1951–1974)
- Mark O. Hatfield (Kappa 1965 honorary), Oregon Secretary of State (1957–1959)
- Kent Hance (Eta Theta 1969 faculty), Texas Senate (1975–1979)
- C. Fred Jones (Alpha Phi 1950), Florida House of Representatives (1972–1992)
- Clarence W. Meadows (Alpha Delta 1923), West Virginia House of Delegates (1931–1932)
- Joseph M. Montoya (Beta Tau 1964 honorary) New Mexico House of Representatives (1936–1940); New Mexico Senate (1940–1946)
- Tonya Schuitmaker (Gamma Mu), Michigan Senate (2011–present); Michigan House of Representatives (2005–2011)
- William A. Shands (Alpha Phi 1955 honorary), Florida Senate (1940–1958)
- Vernon W. Thomson (Alpha Mu 1958 honorary), Wisconsin State Assembly (1935–1951)
- Ralph Turlington (Alpha Phi 1947 faculty), Florida House of Representatives, Florida Commissioner of Education
- Kim Wyman (Omega Beta 2015 honorary), Secretary of State of Washington
- Richard Arthur Young, Michigan House of Representatives (1965–1994)

=== Local officials ===
- W. Haydon Burns (Jacksonville Alumni 1962, honorary), Mayor of Jacksonville, Florida (1949–1965)
- Hal Daub (Alpha Lambda 1962), Mayor of Omaha, Nebraska (1995–2001)
- Robert King High (Alpha Phi 1964 honorary), Mayor of Miami, Florida (1957–1967)
- Richard Lugar (Hoosier Alumni 1968 honorary), Mayor of Indianapolis, Indiana
- Robert D. Ray, Mayor of Des Moines, Iowa

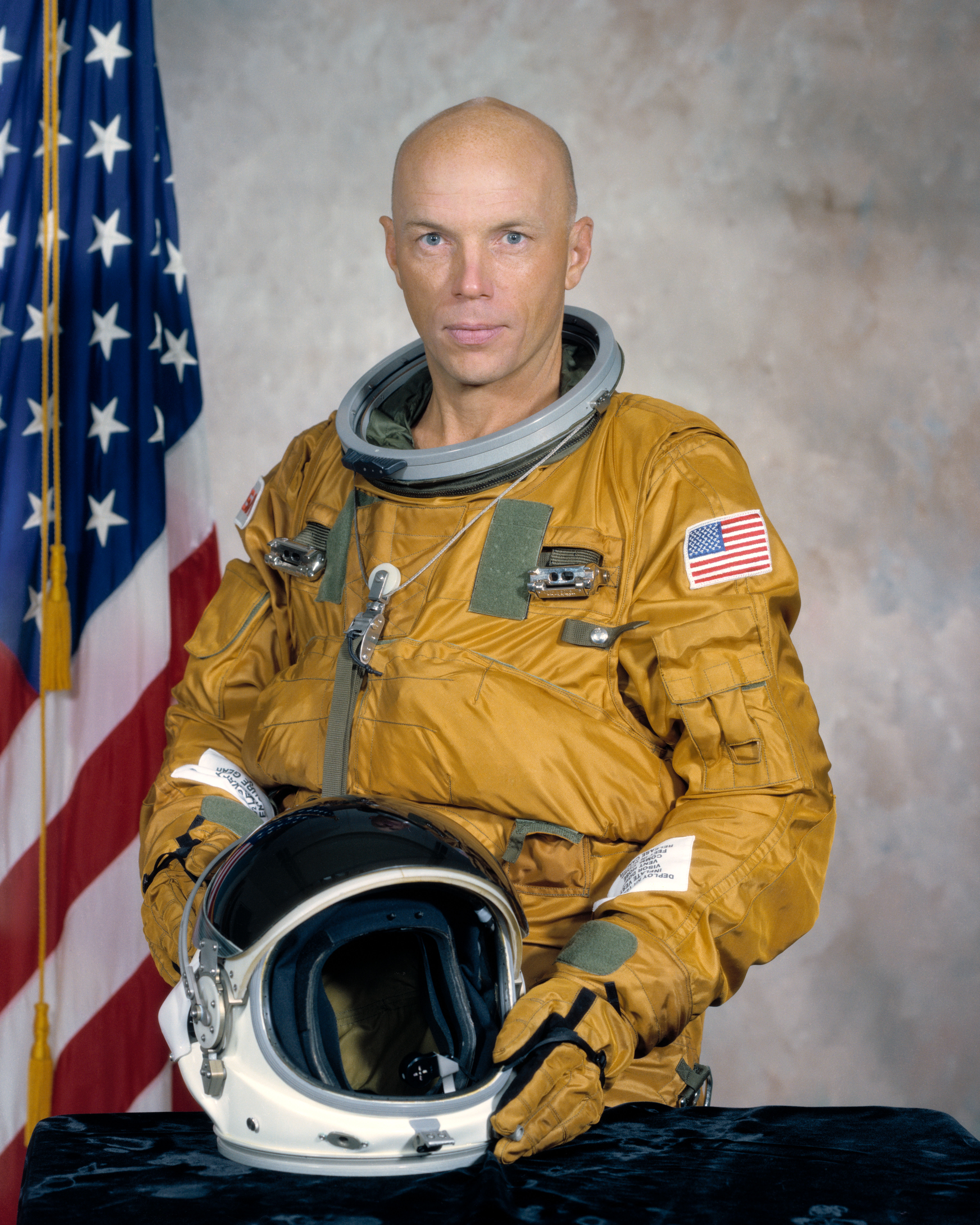
F. Story Musgrave

== Religion ==
- Thomas S. Monson, President of the Church of Jesus Christ of Latter-day Saints

== Science and technology ==
- F. Story Musgrave (Alpha Omicron), NASA astronaut
- Alexis Ohanian (Alpha Gamma), co-founder of Reddit
- William C. Schneider (Upsilon), aerospace engineer; missions operations director of the Gemini Program

== See also ==
- List of Alpha Kappa Psi chapters
