= Robert Beall =

Robert Beall or Beal may refer to:

- Robert Beall (sculptor) (c. 1836–1892), English sculptor, marble merchant and monumental mason
- Robert M. Beall II, American heir and businessman
- Bob Beall (Robert Brooks Beall, born 1948), American baseball player
- Robert Beal (bishop) (1929–2009), Australian Anglican bishop
- Robert Beal Jr. (born 1999), American football defensive end

== See also ==
- Robert Beale (disambiguation)
