= List of Alpha Kappa Psi chapters =

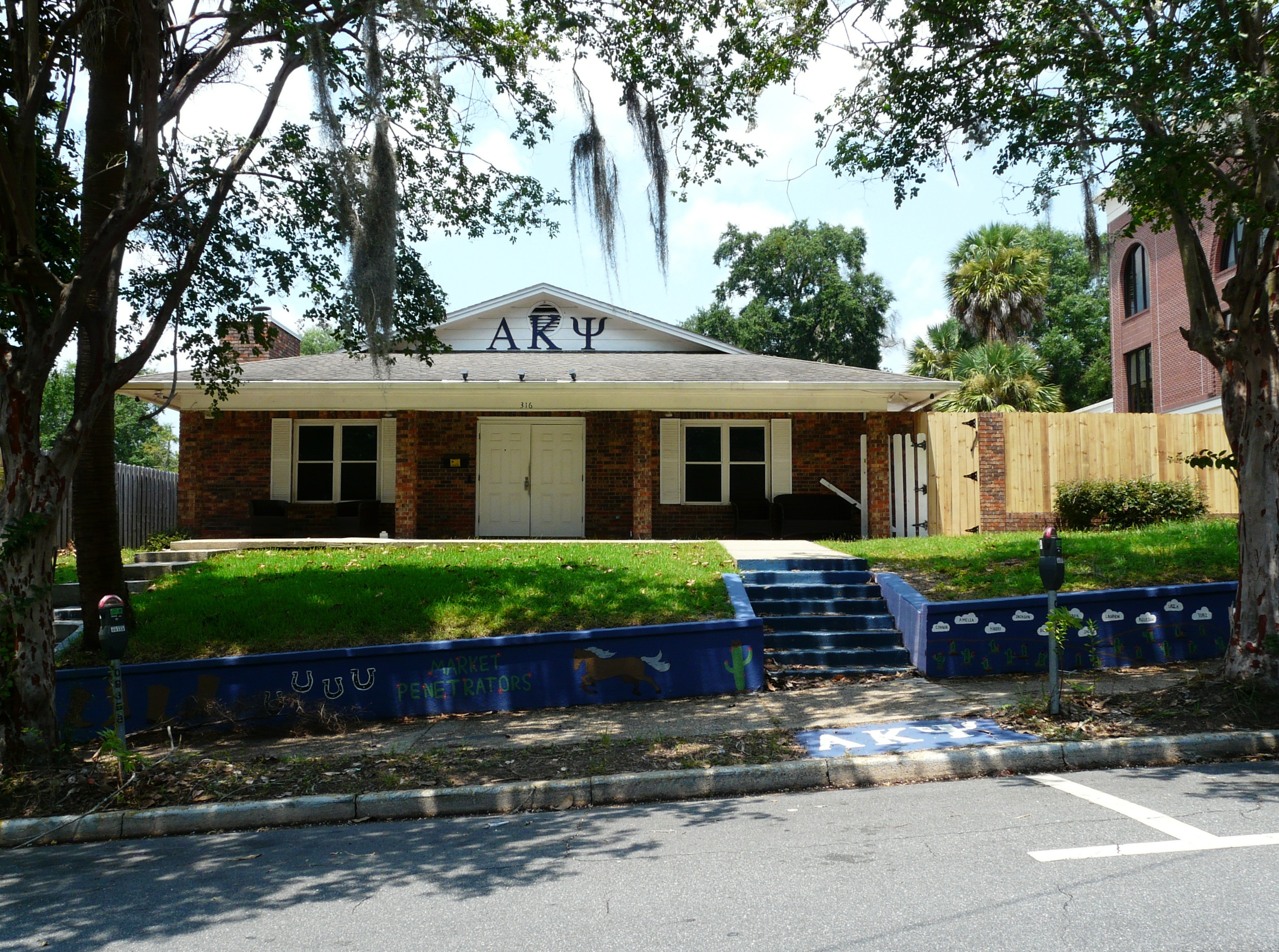
Beta Psi Chapter in Tallahassee, Florida

The American fraternity Alpha Kappa Psi has established over 350 "chapters" (local sections) in universities and colleges all over the United States and elsewhere, in addition to about 90 chapters of alumni in American cities and a small number of colonies. The majority of the chapters remain active. The names of the college chapters consist of either one or two Greek letters.

== Naming convention ==
Chapters of Alpha Kappa Psi are given names consisting of either one or two Greek letters. The names are issued in order according to the dates on which the chapters are chartered. Alpha is the name given to the founding chapter at New York University, followed by Beta at the University of Denver for the second chapter, then Gamma, and so on. Once the Greek alphabet had been exhausted by using single letters, two-letter names began to be issued, starting with Alpha Beta, then Alpha Gamma, then Alpha Delta, etc.

In the first cycle of chapter naming, no two-letter chapter name consists of identical Greek letters, and letters that came before the first letter of a chapter's name in the Greek alphabet were not used for the second letter. Thus, after Alpha Omega the next name issued was Beta Gamma to Indiana University, not Beta Alpha or Beta Beta. Likewise, after Beta Omega, the next name issued was Gamma Delta; Gamma Alpha, Gamma Beta, and Gamma Gamma were not used. Using this system, 300 names could be issued to college chapters, ending in 2005 with Psi Omega at Santa Clara University. Beginning that year, the Fraternity began to issue the unused two-letter names in reverse order. As with the first naming cycle, no two-letter chapter name consisting of identical Greek letters would be issued. Thus, the next charter issued after Psi Omega was to Omega Psi. Omega Omega was not used.

== Chapters with houses ==
Chapter houses were at one time common in the fraternity. The need for housing and private meeting space can be traced back to Alpha chapter, where a committee chaired by George W. Myer Jr. was charged in 1905 with the task of securing a meeting-room near the School of Commerce at NYU. In the fall of that same year, the chapter began to meet in a room at 28 East 11th Street, at a weekly rental of $1. When the Class of 1906 graduated the following June, the chapter had to move. Another committee was appointed to seek a new location for the new semester, and in October 1906, the chapter approved the rental of two rooms and bath at the Benedict, 80 Washington Square East, at $31.25 a month. The chapter would remain at the new location for four years. In fall 1907, the chapter expanded to two additional rooms at the Benedict for $51.50 a month. With conditions becoming crowded at the Benedict, Alpha obtained its first official chapter house on October 24, 1910, located at 113 Waverly Place, New York, New York.

A select number of chapters still have actual houses on college campuses. These chapters include:

- Florida State University (Beta Psi)
- Michigan State University (Gamma Mu)
- Pennsylvania State University (Gamma Epsilon)
- Tennessee Technological University (Zeta Upsilon)
- University of Georgia (Alpha Epsilon)
- University of Minnesota (Alpha Eta)
- University of Southern California (Alpha Zeta)
- Central Michigan University (Zeta Xi)
- Western Michigan University (Gamma Tau)

== Chapter facts and statistics ==
Chapter of the Year

- 2016-2017 - Alpha Chi - Emory University
- 2015-2016 - Mu Sigma - San Diego State University
- 2013-2014 - Beta Xi - Virginia Tech
- 2011-2012 - Gamma Iota - Loyola University Chicago
- 2010-2011 - Omega Theta - University of Maryland, College Park
- 2009-2010 - Theta - Oregon State University
- 2008-2009 - Omega Theta - University of Maryland, College Park
- 2007-2008 - Xi Omega - University of South Florida
- 2006-2007 - Alpha Gamma - University of Virginia
- 2005-2006 - Beta Xi - Virginia Tech
- 2004-2005 - Omicron Tau - Rutgers University
- 2003-2004 - Alpha Beta - University of California, Berkeley

Chapters with more than 135 student members as of 2013

- 214 - Zeta Lambda - Haslam College of Business, University of Tennessee
- 203 - Alpha Phi - Warrington College of Business Administration, University of Florida
- 171 - Upsilon - Trulaske College of Business, University of Missouri
- 159 - Beta Psi - College of Business, Florida State University
- 157 - Gamma Chi - Farmer School of Business, Miami University
- 157 - Beta Gamma - Kelley School of Business, Indiana University
- 153 - Alpha Mu - Wisconsin School of Business, University of Wisconsin–Madison
- 153 - Alpha Nu - Eller College of Management, University of Arizona
- 136 - Beta Mu - George Washington University School of Business, George Washington University
- 140 - Pi Chi - Freeman School of Business, Tulane University
- 138 - Alpha Epsilon - Terry College of Business, University of Georgia
- 158 - Rho Tau - School of Business Administration, University of Mississippi

== List of college chapters ==
Please note:

- Many Universities and Colleges with chapters have undergone name changes since charters were granted. The most current University name is used.
- An asterisk (*) indicates that Universities and/or Colleges have merged. Duplicate entries in this list are not errors!

Number	Chapter	Installation Date	College or University	Location	Status	Notes
1	Alpha	October 5, 1904	New York University	New York, New York	Closed	Closed in 2025.
2	Beta	March 10, 1910	University of Denver	Denver, Colorado	Active	Re-chartered March 8, 2003
3	Gamma	November 4, 1911	Northwestern University	Chicago, Illinois	Active	Re-chartered February 2, 2002
4	Delta	October 29, 1912	University of Pittsburgh	Pittsburgh, Pennsylvania	Active	Closed in 1964. Re-chartered April 4, 1982.
5	Epsilon	April 16, 1913	University of Illinois at Urbana-Champaign	Champaign, Illinois	Active	
6	Zeta	May 7, 1914	University of Nebraska–Lincoln	Lincoln, Nebraska	Active	Re-chartered January 12, 1998.
7	Eta	May 24, 1914	University of Cincinnati	Cincinnati, Ohio	Active	
8	Theta	May 30, 1914	Oregon State University	Corvallis, Oregon	Active	Closed in 1933. Re-chartered April 26, 1979. Re-chartered May 15, 1999.
9	Iota	March 6, 1915	University of Texas at Austin	Austin, Texas	Active	Re-chartered April 13, 1947.
10	Kappa	May 3, 1915	University of Oregon	Eugene, Oregon	Active	
11	Lambda	June 1, 1915	University of Oklahoma	Norman, Oklahoma	Closed	Closed in 1933.
12	Mu	June 6, 1915	Ohio State University	Columbus, Ohio	Active	
13	Nu	April 29, 1916	Boston University	Boston, Massachusetts	Active	Re-chartered October 1, 1938. Closed in 1964. Re-chartered October 27, 2007
14	Xi	May 1, 1916	Harvard University	Cambridge, Massachusetts	Closed	Closed in 1918.
15	Omicron	April 21, 1917	University of Montana	Missoula, Montana	Closed	
16	Pi	November 27, 1917	Georgia State University	Atlanta, Georgia	Active	
17	Rho	June 12, 1919	University of Washington	Seattle, Washington	Active	
18	Sigma	October 21, 1919	Colorado College	Colorado Springs, Colorado	Closed	Closed in 1966.
19	Tau	April 10, 1920	Oklahoma State University	Stillwater, Oklahoma	Closed	Re-chartered May 2, 1998.
20	Upsilon	April 10, 1920	University of Missouri	Columbia, Missouri	Active	
21	Phi	May 1, 1920	University of Michigan	Ann Arbor, Michigan	Active	Re-chartered October 31, 1987
22	Chi	May 22, 1920	Columbia University	New York, New York	Active	Re-chartered March 24, 2012
23	Psi	May 29, 1920	University of Kansas	Lawrence, Kansas	Active	
24	Omega	January 22, 1921	College of William and Mary	Williamsburg, Virginia	Active	Closed in 1936. Re-Chartered April 27, 1996
25	Alpha Beta	March 8, 1921	University of California, Berkeley	Berkeley, California	Active	Re-chartered April 27, 1956. Re-chartered April 3, 1999
26	Alpha Gamma	June 3, 1921	University of Virginia	Charlottesville, Virginia	Active	
27	Alpha Delta	May 13, 1922	Washington and Lee University	Lexington, Virginia	Closed	Closed in 1929.
28	Alpha Epsilon	March 18, 1922	University of Georgia	Athens, Georgia	Active	
29	Alpha Zeta	May 3, 1922	University of Southern California	Los Angeles, California	Active	
30	Alpha Eta	May 20, 1922	University of Minnesota	Minneapolis, Minnesota	Active	
31	Alpha Theta	November 18, 1922	Utah State University	Logan, Utah	Closed	
32	Alpha Iota	November 17, 1922	University of Utah	Salt Lake City, Utah	Active	Re-chartered April 16, 2016
33	Alpha Kappa	May 11, 1923	University of Idaho	Moscow, Idaho	Closed	
34	Alpha Lambda	May 16, 1923	Washington University in St. Louis	St. Louis, Missouri	Active	Re-chartered March 31, 2001
35	Alpha Mu	May 17, 1923	University of Wisconsin–Madison	Madison, Wisconsin	Active	
36	Alpha Nu	May 7, 1923	University of Arizona	Tucson, Arizona	Closed	Re-chartered February 6, 1982. Closed in 2022.
37	Alpha Xi	May 25, 1923	University of Iowa	Iowa City, Iowa	Active	Re-chartered April 25, 1948.
38	Alpha Omicron	May 26, 1923	Syracuse University	Syracuse, New York	Active	Re-chartered 2011
39	Alpha Pi	November 12, 1923	Southern Methodist University	Dallas, Texas	Active	Closed in 1962. Re-chartered.
40	Alpha Rho	April 1, 1924	University of Alabama	Tuscaloosa, Alabama	Active	Re-chartered in 1997
41	Alpha Sigma	May 19, 1924	Lehigh University	Bethlehem, Pennsylvania	Closed	
42	Alpha Tau	February 18, 1925	University of North Carolina	Chapel Hill, North Carolina	Closed	Re-chartered November 7, 1948.
43	Alpha Upsilon	January 5, 1926	University of California	Los Angeles, California	Active	Re-chartered March 13, 1999.
44	Alpha Phi	January 22, 1926	University of Florida	Gainesville, Florida	Active	
45	Alpha Chi	January 25, 1926	Emory University	Atlanta, Georgia	Active	Closed in 1963. Re-chartered April 26, 2006.
46	Alpha Psi	March 11, 1926	Marquette University	Milwaukee, Wisconsin	Closed	
47	Alpha Omega	May 10, 1926	Kansas State University	Manhattan, Kansas	Active	
48	Beta Gamma	April 5, 1927	Indiana University	Bloomington, Indiana	Active	
49	Beta Delta	January 14, 1928	Brigham Young University	Provo, Utah	Closed	Closed in 1952.
50	Beta Epsilon	June 3, 1928	University of Chicago	Chicago, Illinois	Active	Closed in 1934. Re-Chartered November 10, 2012
51	Beta Zeta	November 10, 1928	University of Arkansas	Fayetteville, Arkansas	Active	
52	Beta Eta	December 7, 1929	Duke University	Durham, North Carolina	Closed	Closed in 1966. Re-chartered January 13, 2007. Closed in October 2012.
53	Beta Theta	May 20, 1930	University of Detroit Mercy*	Detroit, Michigan	Closed	Merged with Eta Zeta
54	Beta Iota	April 11, 1931	University at Buffalo, The State University of New York	Buffalo, New York	Active	Re-chartered 2005
55	Beta Kappa	April 18, 1931	University of Western Ontario	London, Ontario, Canada	Closed	Closed in 1947.
56	Beta Lambda	November 19, 1932	Washington State University	Pullman, Washington	Active	Re-chartered April 11, 1999
57	Beta Mu	May 6, 1933	The George Washington University	Washington, District of Columbia	Active	Re-chartered January 27, 2008
58	Beta Nu	May 16, 1936	University of Wyoming	Laramie, Wyoming	Active	
59	Beta Xi	February 18, 1939	Virginia Tech	Blacksburg, Virginia	Closed	Closed until at least until 2019
60	Beta Omicron	May 18, 1941	Wayne State University	Detroit, Michigan	Active	Rechartered April 9, 2016
61	Beta Pi	May 9, 1941	University of Miami	Coral Gables, Florida	Active	
62	Beta Rho	April 4, 1943	West Virginia University	Morgantown, West Virginia	Active	
63	Beta Sigma	January 29, 1947	St. John's University	Jamaica, New York	Active	
64	Beta Tau	May 1, 1948	University of New Mexico	Albuquerque, New Mexico	Closed	Re-chartered April 23, 2005
65	Beta Upsilon	September 25, 1948	University of South Carolina	Columbia, South Carolina	Active	Closed in 1955. Re-chartered April 21, 2007
66	Beta Phi	May 1, 1949	Drake University	Des Moines, Iowa	Active	
67	Beta Chi	May 1, 1949	Louisiana State University	Baton Rouge, Louisiana	Active	Closed in 1961. Re-chartered 1997.
68	Beta Psi	May 28, 1949	Florida State University	Tallahassee, Florida	Active	
69	Beta Omega	December 10, 1949	Samford University	Birmingham, Alabama	Closed	
70	Gamma Delta	May 13, 1950	Wake Forest University	Winston-Salem, North Carolina	Active	Re-chartered November 20, 2003
71	Gamma Epsilon	May 13, 1950	Pennsylvania State University	University Park, Pennsylvania	Active	
72	Gamma Zeta	December 3, 1950	University of Colorado	Boulder, Colorado	Active	
73	Gamma Eta	January 13, 1951	University of Toledo	Toledo, Ohio	Active	
74	Gamma Theta	April 15, 1951	Bradley University	Peoria, Illinois	Closed	
75	Gamma Iota	March 16, 1952	Loyola University	Chicago, Illinois	Active	
76	Gamma Kappa	September 28, 1952	University of Portland	Portland, Oregon	Active	
77	Gamma Lambda	November 1, 1952	California State University, Fresno	Fresno, California	Active	
78	Gamma Mu	December 6, 1952	Michigan State University	East Lansing, Michigan	Active	
79	Gamma Nu	June 7, 1953	Babson College	Wellesley Park, Massachusetts	Active	Re-chartered March 5, 2016
80	Gamma Xi	October 18, 1953	Lewis and Clark College	Portland, Oregon	Closed	
81	Gamma Omicron	November 15, 1953	Norwich University	Northfield, Vermont	Closed	
82	Gamma Pi	January 17, 1954	Seton Hall University	South Orange, New Jersey	Active	
83	Gamma Rho	March 6, 1954	Rockhurst University	Kansas City, Missouri	Closed	Closed in 1955.
84	Gamma Sigma	April 20, 1954	Regis College	Denver, Colorado	Closed	
85	Gamma Tau	May 23, 1954	Western Michigan University	Kalamazoo, Michigan	Active	
86	Gamma Upsilon	January 24, 1954	Wichita State University	Wichita, Kansas	Closed	Closed August 2016
87	Gamma Phi	October 31, 1954	University of Tulsa	Tulsa, Oklahoma	Closed	
88	Gamma Chi	February 13, 1955	Miami University	Oxford, Ohio	Active	
89	Gamma Psi	May 1, 1955	Niagara University	Lewiston, New York	Closed	
90	Gamma Omega	April 16, 1955	Seattle University	Seattle, Washington	Active	
91	Delta Epsilon	May 22, 1955	California State University	Los Angeles, California	Closed	
92	Delta Zeta	May 15, 1955	University of Richmond	Richmond, Virginia	Active	Re-chartered April 3, 2010
93	Delta Eta	May 22, 1955	Boston College	Boston, Massachusetts	Closed	
94	Delta Theta	June 5, 1955	Carroll College	Waukesha, Wisconsin	Closed	
95	Delta Iota	February 19, 1956	Waynesburg College	Waynesburg, Pennsylvania	Closed	
96	Delta Kappa	February 12, 1956	Lipscomb University	Nashville, Tennessee	Active	
97	Delta Lambda	May 5, 1956	Mississippi State University	Starkville, Mississippi	Closed	
98	Delta Mu	May 20, 1956	John Carroll University	University Heights, Ohio	Active	Re-chartered 2011
99	Delta Nu	May 5, 1956	University of Dayton	Dayton, Ohio	Active	Re-chartered 2011
100	Delta Xi	May 13, 1956	Hamline University	St. Paul, Minnesota	Closed	
101	Delta Omicron	June 10, 1956	California State University	Long Beach, California	Active	Re-chartered May 11, 2012
102	Delta Pi	February 3, 1957	Creighton University	Omaha, Nebraska	Active	
103	Delta Rho	March 10, 1957	University of Saint Thomas	St. Paul, Minnesota	Closed	
104	Delta Sigma	April 7, 1957	Saint Louis University	St. Louis, Missouri	Active	
105	Delta Tau	June 15, 1957	Canisius College	Buffalo, New York	Active	
106	Delta Upsilon	May 19, 1957	Idaho State University	Pocatello, Idaho	Active	
107	Delta Phi	December 8, 1957	University of Wisconsin–Milwaukee	Milwaukee, Wisconsin	Active	
108	Delta Chi	February 8, 1958	Clarkson University	Potsdam, New York	Active	First chapter to accept women as members in 1974.
109	Delta Psi	April 13, 1958	Illinois Wesleyan University	Bloomington, Illinois	Active	Re-chartered April 10, 2010
110	Delta Omega	May 11, 1958	Iowa State University	Ames, Iowa	Active	
111	Epsilon Zeta	July 13, 1958	University of Detroit Mercy*	Detroit, Michigan	Closed	
112	Epsilon Eta	October 16, 1958	Baylor University	Waco, Texas	Active	
113	Epsilon Theta	January 31, 1959	Birmingham-Southern College	Birmingham, Alabama	Closed	
114	Epsilon Iota	March 15, 1959	West Texas A&M University	Canyon, Texas	Closed	
115	Epsilon Kappa	April 18, 1959	Southern Illinois University	Carbondale, Illinois	Closed	
116	Epsilon Lambda	April 26, 1959	Old Dominion University	Norfolk, Virginia	Closed	Closed until at least July 2015
117	Epsilon Mu	May 17, 1959	Pittsburg State University	Pittsburg, Kansas	Closed	
118	Epsilon Nu	May 24, 1959	University of Puget Sound	Tacoma, Washington	Closed	
119	Epsilon Xi	May 27, 1959	Gustavus Adolphus College	St. Peter, Minnesota	Closed	
120	Epsilon Omicron	April 24, 1960	Arkansas State University	Jonesboro, Arkansas	Closed	
121	Epsilon Pi	May 21, 1960	University of Alaska	Fairbanks, Alaska	Closed	
122	Epsilon Rho	March 18, 1961	University of Pennsylvania	Philadelphia, Pennsylvania	Active	Re-chartered April 26, 1998
123	Epsilon Sigma	February 9, 1962	Georgia Institute of Technology	Atlanta, Georgia	Active	
124	Epsilon Tau	February 15, 1962	Jacksonville University	Jacksonville, Florida	Closed	2013
125	Epsilon Upsilon	February 13, 1962	Carson-Newman College	Jefferson City, Tennessee	Closed	
126	Epsilon Phi	June 6, 1962	University of Arkansas	Little Rock, Arkansas	Closed	
127	Epsilon Chi	February 24, 1963	Upsala College	East Orange, New Jersey	Closed	University closed
128	Epsilon Psi	March 3, 1963	Fordham University*	New York, New York	Closed	Merged with Eta Sigma
129	Epsilon Omega	May 12, 1963	Portland State University	Portland, Oregon	Closed	Re-chartered March 19, 2011
130	Zeta Eta	May 12, 1963	Pacific Lutheran University	Tacoma, Washington	Closed	
131	Zeta Theta	May 23, 1963	St. Mary's College	Winona, Minnesota	Closed	
132	Zeta Iota	May 9, 1964	Saint Francis College	Brooklyn, New York	Closed	
133	Zeta Kappa	May 2, 1964	Eastern Michigan University	Ypsilanti, Michigan	Closed	
134	Zeta Lambda	May 10, 1964	University of Tennessee	Knoxville, Tennessee	Active	
135	Zeta Mu	June 7, 1964	Bloomfield College	Bloomfield, New Jersey	Closed	
136	Zeta Nu	May 24, 1964	Saint Francis University	Loretto, Pennsylvania	Closed	
137	Zeta Xi	October 25, 1964	Central Michigan University	Mt. Pleasant, Michigan	Active	
138	Zeta Omicron	March 20, 1965	Southeast Missouri State University	Cape Girardeau, Missouri	Closed	
139	Zeta Pi	March 21, 1965	Fort Hays State University	Hays, Kansas	Active	
140	Zeta Rho	May 16, 1965	Marshall University	Huntington, West Virginia	Active	
141	Zeta Sigma	May 23, 1965	Millikin University	Decatur, Illinois	Closed	
142	Zeta Tau	May 30, 1965	Western Kentucky University	Bowling Green, Kentucky	Active	Re-chartered March 20, 1999
143	Zeta Upsilon	May 23, 1965	Tennessee Technological University	Cookeville, Tennessee	Active	
144	Zeta Phi	May 22, 1965	Austin Peay State University	Clarksville, Tennessee	Active	
145	Zeta Chi	May 29, 1965	University of Tennessee at Martin	Martin, Tennessee	Active	
146	Zeta Psi	May 28, 1965	Middle Tennessee State University	Murfreesboro, Tennessee	Active	
147	Zeta Omega	June 14, 1965	St. John's University	Jamaica, New York	Closed	Later combined with Beta Sigma
148	Eta Theta	May 21, 1966	Texas Tech University	Lubbock, Texas	Active	
149	Eta Iota	February 20, 1966	Murray State University	Murray, Kentucky	Active	
150	Eta Kappa	February 19, 1966	Hardin-Simmons University	Abilene, Texas	Closed	
151	Eta Lambda	April 30, 1966	University of Nevada, Las Vegas	Las Vegas, Nevada	Closed	March 2015
152	Eta Mu	May 1, 1966	Stephen F. Austin State University	Nacogdoches, Texas	Closed	
153	Eta Nu	April 24, 1966	University of Michigan	Dearborn, Michigan	Active	Re-chartered on April 12, 2014
154	Eta Xi	May 22, 1966	Youngstown State University	Youngstown, Ohio	Closed	
155	Eta Omicron	November 5, 1966	East Carolina University	Greenville, North Carolina	Active	
156	Eta Pi	October 20, 1966	Adrian College	Adrian, Michigan	Closed	
157	Eta Rho	November 13, 1966	University of Illinois at Chicago	Chicago, Illinois	Active	Re-chartered April 21, 2007
158	Eta Sigma	November 4, 1966	Fordham University*	New York, New York	Closed	
159	Eta Tau	February 12, 1967	Louisiana Tech University	Ruston, Louisiana	Active	Re-chartered May 1, 2010
160	Eta Upsilon	May 6, 1967	University of Montevallo	Montevallo, Alabama	Closed	
161	Eta Phi	May 21, 1967	Eastern Washington University	Cheney, Washington	Active	
162	Eta Chi	December 9, 1967	Northern Michigan University	Marquette, Michigan	Closed	
163	Eta Psi	January 13, 1968	Drexel University	Philadelphia, Pennsylvania	Closed	Re-chartered June 8, 2008; Suspended until at least 2023
164	Eta Omega	February 11, 1968	University of North Carolina at Charlotte	Charlotte, North Carolina	Active	
165	Theta Iota	March 23, 1968	Gannon University	Erie, Pennsylvania	Active	
166	Theta Kappa	April 17, 1968	Michigan Technological University	Houghton, Michigan	Closed	Charter Revoked Fall 2013
167	Theta Lambda	May 25, 1968	Western New England College	Springfield, Massachusetts	Closed	
168	Theta Mu	May 19, 1968	Stetson University	DeLand, Florida	Active	
169	Theta Nu	January 25, 1969	University of South Alabama	Mobile, Alabama	Active	Re-chartered December 2, 2001; Re-chartered April 13, 2019
170	Theta Xi	April 13, 1969	Trine University, formerly Tri-State University	Angola, Indiana	Closed	
171	Theta Omicron	March 30, 1969	Boise State University	Boise, Idaho	Active	
172	Theta Pi	May 3, 1969	Southern Benedictine College	Cullman, Alabama	Closed	University closed
173	Theta Rho	May 10, 1969	University of Texas-Pan American	Edinburg, Texas	Closed	
174	Theta Sigma	April 19, 1969	Texas State University	San Marcos, Texas	Closed	
175	Theta Tau	November 23, 1969	Western Carolina University	Cullowhee, North Carolina	Closed	Closed in Aug 2014
176	Theta Upsilon	April 4, 1970	Point Park College	Pittsburgh, Pennsylvania	Closed	
177	Theta Phi	May 3, 1970	University of Southern Indiana	Evansville, Indiana	Active	
178	Theta Chi	May 16, 1970	University of West Georgia	Carrollton, Georgia	Closed	
179	Theta Psi	December 5, 1970	University of Memphis	Memphis, Tennessee	Closed	Re-chartered May 15, 2010
180	Theta Omega	December 5, 1970	Pfeiffer University	Misenheimer, North Carolina	Closed	
181	Iota Kappa	February 14, 1971	American International College	Springfield, Massachusetts	Closed	
182	Iota Lambda	April 3, 1971	Benedictine College	Atchison, Kansas	Closed	
183	Iota Mu	July 24, 1971	University of the Pacific	Stockton, California	Closed	
184	Iota Nu	December 19, 1971	West Liberty State College	West Liberty, West Virginia	Closed	
185	Iota Xi	May 6, 1972	Arizona State University	Tempe, Arizona	Active	
186	Iota Omicron	June 30, 1972	California State University	San Bernardino, California	Closed	Re-chartered 2011
187	Iota Pi	May 27, 1972	Christopher Newport University	Newport News, Virginia	Active	
188	Iota Rho	November 18, 1973	Montclair State University	Montclair, New Jersey	Closed	
189	Iota Sigma	December 11, 1976	Sam Houston State University	Huntsville, Texas	Active	
190	Iota Tau	February 11, 1978	University of San Diego	San Diego, California	Closed	
191	Iota Upsilon	April 29, 1978	Slippery Rock University	Slippery Rock, Pennsylvania	Active	
192	Iota Phi	April 30, 1978	Winthrop University	Rock Hill, South Carolina	Active	
193	Iota Chi	May 6, 1978	Henderson State University	Arkadelphia, Arkansas	Active	Re-chartered April 13, 2013
194	Iota Psi	May 7, 1978	Francis Marion University	Florence, South Carolina	Closed	
195	Iota Omega	May 13, 1978	Northern Arizona University	Flagstaff, Arizona	Active	Re-chartered March 29, 2014
196	Kappa Lambda	October 15, 1978	Northwood University	Midland, Michigan	Suspended	
197	Kappa Mu	April 21, 1979	Kean University	Union, New Jersey	Closed	
198	Kappa Nu	April 28, 1979	Lander College	Greenwood, South Carolina	Closed	
199	Kappa Xi	May 12, 1979	Central Washington University	Ellensburg, Washington	Active	
200	Kappa Omicron	May 19, 1979	Bellevue College	Bellevue, Nebraska	Closed	
201	Kappa Pi	August 4, 1979	Incarnate Word College	San Antonio, Texas	Closed	
202	Kappa Rho	February 2, 1980	University of Texas at Brownsville	Brownsville, Texas	Closed	
203	Kappa Sigma	April 19, 1980	Indiana University of Pennsylvania	Indiana, Pennsylvania	Closed	
204	Kappa Tau	April 26, 1980	Lamar University	Beaumont, Texas	Active	
205	Kappa Upsilon	April 23, 1980	South Carolina State University	Orangeburg, South Carolina	Active	
206	Kappa Phi	June 28, 1980	Alabama State University	Montgomery, Alabama	Suspended	
207	Kappa Chi	April 25, 1981	Appalachian State University	Boone, North Carolina	Closed	
208	Kappa Psi	May 30, 1981	Seattle Pacific University	Seattle, Washington	Closed	
209	Kappa Omega	April 3, 1982	University of South Carolina	Aiken, South Carolina	Closed	
210	Lambda Mu	May 1, 1982	Texas Lutheran University	Seguin, Texas	Active	
211	Lambda Nu	September 25, 1982	American University	Washington, District of Columbia	Active	
212	Lambda Xi	October 22, 1982	George Fox Evangelical Seminary	Portland, Oregon	Closed	
213	Lambda Omicron	March 19, 1983	North Carolina State University	Raleigh, North Carolina	Active	
214	Lambda Pi	April 8, 1983	Southwestern University	Georgetown, Texas	Closed	
215	Lambda Rho	April 23, 1983	Missouri State University	Springfield, Missouri	Active	
216	Lambda Sigma	April 28, 1983	University of Central Arkansas	Conway, Arkansas	Closed	
217	Lambda Tau	October 8, 1983	Phillips University	Enid, Oklahoma	Closed	
218	Lambda Upsilon	March 24, 1984	Butler University	Indianapolis, Indiana	Active	
219	Lambda Phi	April 7, 1984	Southwestern Oklahoma State University	Weatherford, Oklahoma	Closed	
220	Lambda Chi	April 28, 1984	Texas A&M University	College Station, Texas	Closed	
221	Lambda Psi	May 26, 1984	Menlo College	Atherton, California	Closed	
222	Lambda Omega	March 23, 1985	Adams State College	Alamosa, Colorado	Closed	
223	Mu Nu	May 4, 1985	Oakland University	Rochester, Michigan	Closed	Closed in August 2016
224	Mu Xi	April 20, 1985	Virginia State University	Petersburg, Virginia	Closed	
225	Mu Omicron	April 27, 1985	Indiana State University	Terre Haute, Indiana	Active	
226	Mu Pi	May 4, 1985	Elon University	Elon, North Carolina	Active	
227	Mu Rho	December 8, 1985	University of Texas at Dallas	Dallas, Texas	Active	Re-chartered May 2010
228	Mu Sigma	November 16, 1986	San Diego State University	San Diego, CA	Active	
229	Mu Tau	December 6, 1986	Webster University	St. Louis, Missouri	Closed	
230	Mu Upsilon	April 25, 1987	California State University	Bakersfield, California	Closed	
231	Mu Phi	April 25, 1987	California State University	Northridge, California	Closed	
232	Mu Chi	May 26, 1987	Dominican College	Orangeburg, New York	Closed	
233	Mu Psi	January 28, 1989	Hofstra University	Hempstead, New York	Active	
234	Mu Omega	May 6, 1989	Auburn University	Auburn, Alabama	Active	
235	Nu Xi	May 14, 1989	University of California, San Diego	San Diego, California	Active	
236	Nu Omicron	November 18, 1989	Houston Baptist University	Houston, Texas	Closed	
237	Nu Pi	January 27, 1990	Trinity University	San Antonio, Texas	Active	
238	Nu Rho	April 22, 1990	Colorado State University	Fort Collins, Colorado	Closed	
239	Nu Sigma	December 8, 1990	Davenport College	Grand Rapids, Michigan	Closed	
240	Nu Tau	January 26, 1991	Roanoke College	Salem, Virginia	Closed	
241	Nu Upsilon	February 9, 1991	Marist College	Poughkeepsie, New York	Closed	
242	Nu Phi	March 17, 1991	University of Pittsburgh	Johnstown, Pennsylvania	Active	
243	Nu Chi	April 20, 1991	University of Central Florida	Orlando, Florida	Active	
244	Nu Psi	November 9, 1991	James Madison University	Harrisonburg, Virginia	Active	
245	Nu Omega	January 25, 1992	Wesleyan College	Macon, Georgia	Closed	
246	Xi Omicron	March 28, 1992	University of Texas at San Antonio	San Antonio, Texas	Closed	
247	Xi Pi	April 25, 1992	Lock Haven University	Lock Haven, Pennsylvania	Closed	
248	Xi Rho	May 2, 1992	Ohio University	Athens, Ohio	Active	
249	Xi Sigma	June 27, 1992	Florida International University	Miami, Florida	Active	
250	Xi Tau	April 8, 1995	Shippensburg University	Shippensburg, Pennsylvania	Active	
251	Xi Upsilon	May 6, 1995	Centenary College	Hackettstown, New Jersey	Closed	
252	Xi Phi	May 6, 1995	University of Northern Colorado	Greeley, Colorado	Active	
253	Xi Chi	May 4, 1996	University of La Verne	La Verne, California	Active	
254	Xi Psi	April 6, 1997	Illinois State University	Normal, Illinois	Active	Re-chartered April 10, 2010
255	Xi Omega	April 12, 1997	University of South Florida	Tampa, Florida	Active	
256	Omicron Pi	April 13, 1997	Azusa Pacific University	Azusa, California	Closed	
257	Omicron Rho	May 10, 1997	Fairleigh Dickinson University	Teaneck, New Jersey	Closed	
258	Omicron Sigma	November 15, 1997	Radford University	Radford, Virginia	Active	
259	Omicron Tau	May 25, 1998	Rutgers University	New Brunswick, New Jersey	Active	Re-chartered 2024
260	Omicron Upsilon	November 8, 1998	Cornell University	Ithaca, New York	Active	
261	Omicron Phi	November 21, 1998	University of Louisville	Louisville, Kentucky	Active	Re-chartered November 14, 2026
262	Omicron Chi	December 5, 1998	Case Western Reserve University	Cleveland, Ohio	Active	
263	Omicron Psi	December 6, 1998	University of Kentucky	Lexington, Kentucky	Active	
264	Omicron Omega	February 6, 1999	University of California, Santa Barbara	Santa Barbara, California	Active	
265	Pi Rho	February 4, 1999	California Polytechnic State University	San Luis Obispo, California	Active	
266	Pi Sigma	April 24, 1999	George Mason University	Fairfax, Virginia	Active	Re-chartered May 8, 2011
267	Pi Tau	April 25, 1999	Stanford University	Stanford, California	Active	
268	Pi Upsilon	May 8, 1999	California State University	San Marcos, California	Active	
269	Pi Phi	November 11, 1999	Penn State University	State College, Pennsylvania	Closed	
270	Pi Chi	November 5, 1999	Tulane University	New Orleans, Louisiana	Active	Re-chartered January 31, 2004
271	Pi Psi	December 11, 1999	University of California-Irvine	Irvine, California	Active	Re-chartered February 8, 2014 (akpsi.org shows Feb 8, The Diary 2014, No. 1 shows Feb 18)
272	Pi Omega	February 5, 2000	Purdue University	West Lafayette, Indiana	Active	
273	Rho Sigma	October 7, 2000	College of Charleston	Charleston, South Carolina	Closed	Closed in August 2016
274	Rho Tau	October 29, 2000	University of Mississippi	Oxford, Mississippi	Active	
275	Rho Upsilon	November 18, 2000	Missouri Western State College	St. Joseph, Missouri	Active	
276	Rho Phi	January 6, 2001	University of California	Riverside, California	Active	
277	Rho Chi	April 21, 2001	Chapman University	Orange, California	Active	
278	Rho Psi	April 21, 2001	Johns Hopkins University	Baltimore, Maryland	Active	
279	Rho Omega	April 22, 2001	Campbell University	Buies Creek, North Carolina	Closed	
280	Sigma Tau	April 28, 2001	Pace University	New York, New York	Closed	
281	Sigma Upsilon	May 5, 2001	University of Manchester Institute of Science and Technology*	Manchester, England, United Kingdom	Merged	Merged with University of Manchester
282	Sigma Upsilon Phi	May 5, 2001	University of Manchester*	Manchester, England, United Kingdom	Active	Merged with MMU & UMIST (previously Sigma Phi chapter)
283	Sigma Chi	May 5, 2001	Manchester Metropolitan University	Manchester, England, United Kingdom	Closed	
284	Sigma Psi	May 12, 2001	Loyola University New Orleans	New Orleans, Louisiana	Active	
285	Sigma Omega	March 23, 2002	Florida Atlantic University	Boca Raton, Florida	Active	
286	Tau Upsilon	March 23, 2002	Truman State University	Kirksville, Missouri	Active	
287	Tau Phi	April 13, 2002	Quinnipiac University	Hamden, Connecticut	Closed	
288	Tau Chi	April 13, 2002	DePaul University	Chicago, Illinois	Active	
289	Tau Psi	April 20, 2002	University of Houston	Houston, Texas	Active	
290	Tau Omega	April 20, 2002	University of Southern Mississippi	Hattiesburg, Mississippi	Active	
291	Upsilon Phi	April 20, 2002	Montana State University	Bozeman, Montana	Closed	
292	Upsilon Chi	November 9, 2002	Ball State University	Muncie, Indiana	Active	
293	Upsilon Psi	November 24, 2002	University of California, Davis	Davis, California	Active	
294	Upsilon Omega	December 8, 2002	Arizona State University West	Phoenix, Arizona	Closed	
295	Phi Chi	January 25, 2003	McGill University	Montreal, Quebec, Canada	Closed	
296	Phi Psi	March 8, 2003	North Dakota State University	Fargo, North Dakota	Closed	
297	Phi Omega	April 27, 2003	Gonzaga University	Spokane, Washington	Active	
298	Chi Psi	November 16, 2003	Tennessee State University	Nashville, Tennessee	Active	
299	Chi Omega	November 23, 2003	University of North Texas	Denton, Texas	Active	
300	Psi Omega	January 8, 2005	Santa Clara University	Santa Clara, California	Active	
301	Omega Psi	January 15, 2005	Carnegie Mellon University	Pittsburgh, Pennsylvania	Active	
302	Omega Chi	March 12, 2005	University of Calgary	Calgary, Alberta, Canada	Active	
303	Omega Phi	March 23, 2005	San José State University	San Jose, California	Active	
304	Omega Upsilon	April 9, 2005	Clemson University	Clemson, South Carolina	Closed	
305	Omega Tau	April 30, 2005	University of Alabama	Birmingham, Alabama	Active	
306	Omega Sigma	May 7, 2005	University of Wisconsin–Whitewater	Whitewater, Wisconsin	Closed	
307	Omega Rho	May 22, 2005	Nova Southeastern University	Fort Lauderdale, Florida	Active	
308	Omega Pi	November 19, 2005	University of Maine	Orono, Maine	Closed	
309	Omega Omicron	December 3, 2005	Eastern Kentucky University	Richmond, Kentucky	Closed	
310	Omega Xi	January 14, 2006	Florida A&M University	Tallahassee, Florida	Active	
311	Omega Nu	February 18, 2006	Vanderbilt University	Nashville, Tennessee	Active	
312	Omega Mu	April 23, 2006	University of Tennessee at Chattanooga	Chattanooga, Tennessee	Closed	
313	Omega Lambda	April 30, 2006	Georgetown University	Washington, District of Columbia	Active	
314	Omega Kappa	May 6, 2006	Towson University	Towson, Maryland	Active	
315	Omega Iota	May 7, 2006	Delaware State University	Dover, Delaware	Closed	
316	Omega Theta	January 27, 2007	University of Maryland, College Park	College Park, Maryland	Active	
317	Omega Eta	April 15, 2007	Furman University	Greenville, South Carolina	Closed	
318	Omega Zeta	November 3, 2007	Binghamton University	Vestal, New York	Active	
319	Omega Epsilon	April 19, 2008	Pepperdine University	Malibu, California	Active	
320	Omega Delta	January 24, 2009	University of New Hampshire	Durham, New Hampshire	Active	
321	Omega Gamma	January 31, 2009	University of British Columbia	Vancouver, British Columbia	Active	
322	Omega Beta	February 21, 2009	Western Washington University	Bellingham, Washington	Active	
323	Omega Alpha	March 14, 2009	University of Delaware	Newark, Delaware	Active	
324	Psi Chi	April 19, 2009	Jacksonville State University	Jacksonville, Alabama	Active	
325	Psi Phi	April 25, 2009	University of Nevada-Reno	Reno, Nevada	Active	
326	Psi Upsilon	May 10, 2009	University of California, Merced	Merced, California	Active	
327	Psi Tau	November 7, 2009	Howard University	Washington, D.C.	Active	
328	Psi Sigma	February 20, 2010	University of North Carolina at Greensboro	Greensboro, NC	Active	
329	Psi Rho	March 27, 2010	University of Connecticut	Storrs, CT	Active	
330	Psi Pi	April 10, 2010	Stony Brook University	Stony Brook, NY	Closed	Recognition Withdrawn
331	Psi Omicron	May 1, 2010	State University of New York Geneseo	Geneseo, NY	Active	
332	Psi Xi	May 2, 2010	Grand Valley State University	Allendale, MI	Active	
333	Psi Nu	March 11, 2011	Baruch College	New York, NY	Active	
334	Psi Mu	April 9, 2011	University of Rochester	Rochester, NY	Active	
335	Psi Lambda	May 7, 2011	Bentley University	Waltham, MA	Active	
336	Psi Kappa	May 14, 2011	San Francisco State University	San Francisco, CA	Active	
337	Psi Iota	December 3, 2011	Monmouth University	West Long Branch, NJ	Closed	
338	Psi Theta	February 11, 2012	Southern Oregon University	Ashland, OR	Closed	
339	Psi Eta	April 7, 2012	Temple University	Philadelphia, Pennsylvania	Closed	
340	Psi Zeta	April 21, 2012	Coastal Carolina University	Conway, South Carolina	Active	
341	Psi Epsilon	April 21, 2012	Loyola Marymount University	Los Angeles, California	Active	
342	Psi Delta	April 29, 2012	Shenandoah University	Winchester, Virginia	Active	
343	Psi Gamma	April 29, 2012	West Virginia State University	Institute, West Virginia	Closed	
344	Psi Beta	April 6, 2013	University of North Florida	Jacksonville, Florida	Closed	Closed in August 2016
345	Psi Alpha	March 23, 2013	Ferris State University	Big Rapids, Michigan	Closed	Closed in August 2016
346	Chi Phi	May 18, 2013	Hong Kong University of Science and Technology	Hong Kong, China	Active	
347	Chi Upsilon	December 7, 2013	Ramapo College of New Jersey	Mahwah, New Jersey	Active	
348	Chi Tau	March 30, 2014	University of North Dakota	Grand Forks, North Dakota	Active	
349	Chi Sigma	April 5, 2014	Northeastern University	Boston, Massachusetts	Active	
350	Chi Rho	April 13, 2014	High Point University	High Point, North Carolina	Active	
351	Chi Pi	April 26, 2014	Virginia Commonwealth University	Richmond, Virginia	Active	
352	Chi Omicron	April 26, 2014	William Paterson University of New Jersey	Wayne, New Jersey	Active	
353	Chi Xi	May 3, 2014	The College of New Jersey	Ewing, New Jersey	Active	
354	Chi Nu	May 3, 2014	University of Missouri-Kansas City	Kansas City, Missouri	Active	
355	Chi Mu	April 18, 2015	Sacred Heart University	Fairfield, Connecticut	Active	
356	Chi Lambda	April 25, 2015	Edinboro University of Pennsylvania	Edinboro, Pennsylvania	Active	
357	Chi Kappa	December 5, 2015	California State University-Monterey Bay	Seaside, California	Active	
358	Chi Iota	December 3, 2016	Loyola University Maryland	Baltimore, Maryland	Active	
359	Chi Theta	March 18, 2017	Simon Fraser University	Burnaby, British Columbia	Inactive	
360	Chi Eta	March 25, 2017	Queen Mary University	London, England	Inactive	
361	Chi Zeta	April 8, 2017	New Jersey Institute of Technology	Newark, New Jersey	Active	
362	Chi Epsilon	May 6, 2017	California State Polytechnic University, Pomona	Pomona, California	Active	
363	Chi Delta	October 28, 2017	Saint Joseph's University	Philadelphia, Pennsylvania	Active	
364	Chi Gamma	June 2, 2018	University of California, Santa Cruz	Santa Cruz, California	Active	
365	Chi Beta	March 2, 2019	California State University, Fullerton	Fullerton, California	Active	

== List of alumni chapters ==
Number	Chapter	Original Charter Date	Last Charter Date	Location	Status
1	New York	1921	May 20, 2012	New York, New York	Active
2	Atlanta	1921	May 17, 2009	Atlanta, Georgia	Active
3	Boston	1922		Boston, Massachusetts	Colony
4	Pittsburgh/Golden Triangle	May 10, 1922	May 14, 2015	Pittsburgh, Pennsylvania	Active
5	Los Angeles Alumni Chapter	1922	November 29, 2021	Los Angeles, San Bernardino, Ventura, Orange County	Active
6	Chicago	May 17, 1924	Summer 2007	Chicago, Illinois	Inactive
7	Denver/Mile High	September 16, 1924	March 2, 2013	Denver, Colorado	Active
8	Twin Cities	June 21, 1925		Minneapolis, Minnesota	Active
9	Salt Lake City	February 26, 1926		Salt Lake City, Utah	Inactive
10	Milwaukee/City of Festivals	March 31, 1928	November 3, 2006	Milwaukee, Wisconsin	Active
11	Cincinnati	March 9, 1929		Cincinnati, Ohio	Inactive
12	Michigan	April 20, 1929		Detroit, Michigan	Suspended*
13	Kansas City/City of Fountains/Kansas City Metro	June 14, 1929	June 1, 2006	Kansas City, Missouri	Active
14	Columbia	May 20, 1932		Columbia, New York	Inactive
15	Detroit	April 26, 1936		Detroit, Michigan	Suspended*
16	Seattle	May 19, 1937	April 21, 2010	Seattle, Washington	Active
17	Washington/Capital Area	January 16, 1942	December 10, 2005	Washington, D.C.	Active
18	Wayne	December 13, 1946		Detroit, Michigan	Suspended*
19	Miami	May 2, 1948		Miami, Florida	Inactive
20	Buffalo-Niagara	May 15, 1948		Buffalo, New York	Inactive
21	St. John's	June 5, 1948		Long Island, New York	Closed
22	Dallas/Ft. Worth	October 6, 1949	June 7, 2015	Dallas, Texas	Active
23	Lincoln	February 24, 1950		Lincoln, Nebraska	Inactive
24	Birmingham	March 11, 1950		Birmingham, Alabama	Inactive
25	Toledo/Glass City	January 12, 1952		Toledo, Ohio	Inactive
26	Omaha	October 2, 1952		Omaha, Nebraska	Closed
27	Portland/Greater Portland	July 18, 1953	January 26, 2013	Portland, Oregon	Active
28	Tallahassee	July 30, 1953		Tallahassee, Florida	Inactive
29	Northern California	April 11, 1955		San Francisco, California	Inactive
30	Peoria	May 27, 1956		Peoria, Illinois	Inactive
31	Northern New Jersey	September 22, 1957		Newark, New Jersey	Inactive
32	Charlotte	April 19, 1958		Charlotte, North Carolina	Inactive
33	Motor City	April 16, 1959		Detroit, Michigan	Active
34	Nashville/Music City	May 29, 1959	May 18, 2013	Nashville, Tennessee	Active
35	Athens	July 1, 1959		Athens, Georgia	Inactive
36	Jacksonville/Florida First Coast	August 28, 1959	May 15, 2015	Jacksonville, Florida	Active
37	Long Beach	February 3, 1961		Long Beach, California	Inactive
38	Tampa/Tampa Bay/Greater Tampa Bay	August 10, 1962		Tampa, Florida	Active
39	St. Petersburg	August 10, 1962		St. Petersburg, Florida	Inactive
40	Cleveland	November 9, 1963		Cleveland, Ohio	Inactive
41	Tacoma	January 18, 1964		Tacoma, Washington	Inactive
42	Dayton	November 7, 1964		Dayton, Ohio	Inactive
43	Central Florida	September 12, 1964	1991	Orlando, Florida	Active
44	Ft. Lauderdale	January 30, 1965		Ft. Lauderdale, Florida	Inactive
45	Pensacola	December 28, 1965		Pensacola, Florida	Inactive
46	Air Capitol	April 1, 1966		Wichita, Kansas	Inactive
47	Tucson	November 5, 1966		Tucson, Arizona	Inactive
48	Gateway	December 4, 1966		St. Louis, Missouri	Inactive
49	Little Rock	March 3, 1967		Little Rock, Arkansas	Inactive
50	Hampton Roads	April 8, 1967	January 14, 2012	Norfolk, Virginia	Active
51	Hoosier	May 9, 1967		Indianapolis, Indiana	Inactive
52	Des Moines	May 4, 1968		Des Moines, Iowa	Inactive
53	Tulsa	May 2, 1969		Tulsa, Oklahoma	Inactive
54	Memphis	December 5, 1970	June 28, 2014	Memphis, Tennessee	Active
55	Phoenix	1972		Phoenix, Arizona	Inactive
56	Garden State	1975	February 20, 2021	North Arlington, New Jersey	Active
57	Texas Gulf Coast	1975		Houston, Texas	Inactive
58	Tri-State	1977		Springfield, Massachusetts	Inactive
59	Hawkeye State	1980		Iowa City, Iowa	Inactive
60	Treasure Valley	March 29, 1980		Boise, Idaho	Inactive
61	San Diego	1981		San Diego, California	Active
62	St. Louis Metro	1981		St. Louis, Missouri	Active
63	Greater Piedmont	1984		Charlotte, North Carolina	Inactive
64	Orange County	1984	March 21, 2014	Orange County, California	Active
65	Central Ohio	1985		Columbus, Ohio	Colony
66	Bay Area	1988	February 20, 2007	San Francisco, California	Active
67	Ohio Valley	1993		Cincinnati, Ohio	Active
68	Alamo City	1994		San Antonio, Texas	Inactive
69	Florida Gold Coast	June 11, 1994		Miami, Florida	Active
70	Queen City	1996		Charlotte, North Carolina	Active
71	Tennessee Valley	1996		Murfreesboro, Tennessee	Inactive
72	Upper Cumberland	Closed		Cookeville, Tennessee	Inactive
73	Spindletop	1996		Beaumont, Texas	Inactive
74	Greater Philadelphia	September 12, 2009	September 12, 2009	Philadelphia, Pennsylvania	Closed
75	Houston	October 9, 2010	October 9, 2010	Houston, Texas	Active
76	Triangle Area	August 11, 2011	August 11, 2011	Raleigh, North Carolina	Active
77	South Carolina	January 14, 2012	January 14, 2012	Columbia, South Carolina	Active
78	Baltimore Metro	December 15, 2012	December 15, 2012	Baltimore, Maryland	Active
79	Crescent City	August 7, 2013	August 7, 2013	New Orleans, Louisiana	Active
80	Greater Gator	May 31, 2014	May 31, 2014	Gainesville, Florida & worldwide	Active
81	London	March 28, 2015	March 28, 2015	London, England	Active
82	Bluegrass	May 30, 2015	May 30, 2015	Louisville, Kentucky	Active
83	ASEAN	June 6, 2015	June 6, 2015	ASEAN region	Active
84	Paradise Coast	September 25, 2015	September 25, 2015	Naples, Florida/Ft. Myers, Florida	Active
85	Central Washington University Alumni Chapter	October 10, 2015	October 10, 2015	Ellensburg, Washington and worldwide	Active
86	Hong Kong	December 5, 2015	December 5, 2015	Hong Kong, China	Active
87	Las Vegas	August 2, 2017	August 2, 2017	Las Vegas, Nevada	Active
88	Panama	November 2017	November 2017	Panama City, Panama	Closed
89	Central California	December 2, 2017	December 2, 2017	Fresno, California	Active
NA.	Florida Treasure Coast	NA		West Palm Beach, Florida	Colony
NA.	Gem State	NA		Pocatello, Idaho	Colony

- The charters from the Michigan, Detroit, and Wayne alumni chapters were suspended in order to facilitate the installation of the combined Motor City Alumni Chapter in 1959.
