= Beheruz Sethna =

American university president

Beheruz Nariman Sethna

President of University of West Georgia
- In office 1994–2013
- Preceded by: Maurice Townsend
- Succeeded by: Kyle Marrero

Personal details
- Born: 1948 (age 77–78) India
- Spouse: Madhavi Sethna
- Education: Columbia University, Indian Institute of Management, Indian Institute of Technology
- Profession: Professor, university president

Beheruz Nariman Sethna (born 1948) is a professor of business and retired sixth president of the University of West Georgia (UWG).

== Early life and education ==
Sethna’s educational credentials include a bachelor's degree in electrical engineering from the Indian Institute of Technology, Bombay (at which institution he has been named a Distinguished Alumnus), an MBA from the Indian Institute of Management, Ahmedabad (named a Distinguished Alumnus as well), an M.Phil. and Ph.D. from Columbia University in New York, and participation in post-doctoral programs at Harvard and Indiana. He is a Certified Computer Professional and a certified Six Sigma Green Belt.

== Career ==
=== Early career ===
Sethna’s previous work experience includes 13 years at Clarkson University in Potsdam, New York (Carnegie classification: Research University with high research activity; Doctoral, STEM dominant) and five years at Lamar University in Beaumont, Texas. He held tenured positions at both institutions and a named professorship at Lamar, in addition to administrative positions of increasing responsibility from the department chair to the executive vice president levels. He also has significant corporate experience having worked in major multinational companies in the U.S. and overseas.

=== University of West Georgia ===
Sethna remains active in teaching and scholarship. He has taught undergraduates every year since arriving at UWG, even while serving in the University System Office. He was elected Honors Professor of the Year and being the faculty advisor for student research teams which won the National Social Sciences Association competition, and for multiple student research teams which have received national recognition at the National Collegiate Honors Council and the National Council for Undergraduate Research. Seven of his courses (including the one he currently teaches) have won recognition in instructional innovation in nationwide competitions. He is the author or co-author of a book and 69 papers, more than 25 of which have been after becoming president.

Sethna was responsible for administrative decisions that contributed to UWG's growth from a liberal arts college of 7,947 students in 1993–94 to an institution with full university status, whose full-time equivalent enrollment has grown by 50 percent since his arrival., including its first Ph.D.

President Sethna has held several board memberships and has chaired boards and committees at the state, regional and national levels. For example, he has served on the board of directors of the Georgia Chamber of Commerce and the Georgia Partnership for Excellence in Education; he has completed a two-year term as chair of the board of the Atlanta Regional Council for Higher Education (ARCHE); and he is the past chair of the board of the Gulf South Conference (GSC) and the Policies and Purposes Committee of the American Association of State Colleges and Universities (AASCU). He also serves as AASCU’s national chair of Asian-American Presidents.

In 2012, Sethna announced his retirement as president after 19 years of service to University of West Georgia. His retirement came in effect 30 June 2013. He continues at UWG as professor of business administration and intends to spend summers teaching English and science at Balgram, an orphanage school in India.

Notable accomplishments during presidency

- Elevated UWG’s reputation such that it was recognized for the first time by U.S. News & World Report magazine in 2012 as the South’s #46 public university and #91 regional (public and private) university
- Became the first known person of Indian origin to become president of a university in the U.S. and the first person of any ethnic minority to become president of a college or university in Georgia (beyond an HBCU)
- Awarded more degrees than every other presidential administration combined
- Created Georgia’s first and only Board-approved Honors College and the Advanced Academy (for exceptionally-gifted students to complete their last two years of high school and first two years of college simultaneously); Academy students have gone to the best universities in the world, such as Yale and Oxford, and one alumnus earned his MD – at age 21
- Obtained the university’s first endowed chair and first major endowment to name a college
- Won approval for UWG’s first four doctoral programs; awarded the first Ph.D. in University System of Georgia history outside of the four research universities and awarded UWG’s first honorary doctorate degrees
- Increased FTE enrollment by approximately 50% with very significant increases in admission standards (for example, in 1994, 51% of the entering freshman class required remedial education, and today, it is a fractional percentage)
- Increased UWG’s investment in students, faculty, and technology by several million dollars (approximately 90% of UWG’s current faculty members were hired during this tenure)
- Added more facilities square footage than every other previous presidential administration combined in its 107-year history
- Increased both land holdings and academic facilities’ square footage by more than 70%
- Recognized seven times for instructional innovation by the Decision Sciences Institute – a national record
- Served as the research advisor for ~40 students whose research projects were selected for one or more national-level presentations; in addition, his students garnered three first prizes in the past decade for undergraduate research at the National Social Sciences Association

=== University System of Georgia ===
He has twice served (in 1999–2000, and 2006–2007) as interim executive/senior vice chancellor for the University System of Georgia with responsibility for academic affairs, student affairs, instructional/information technology, and planning for 35 research and comprehensive universities and access institutions, 260,000 students, and 10,000 faculty. Additionally, in 2006–07, he had line responsibility with the presidents of all 15 comprehensive universities reporting to him, accounting for about 40% of the public sector student enrollment in the entire state of Georgia.

=== Honors and awards ===
- Named among the 100 Most Influential Georgians six times: 2003, 2006, 2009, 2010, 2011 and 2012
- Recognized as the University System of Georgia Chancellor’s 2012 Customer Service President and Institution of the Year
- Received a Resolution of Commendation from the Georgia Board of Regents for service to the University System as Interim Executive/Senior Vice Chancellor
- Awarded a Resolution of Commendation from the Senate of the State of Georgia
- Earned the Cornerstone Award from the Board of Regents of the University System of Georgia
- Elected Honors Professor of the Year by the Honors students
- Named the second ever recipient of the Carroll County Chamber of Commerce’s Thomas S. Upchurch Workforce Education Award

=== Of note ===
Sethna is the first person of Indian origin ever to become president of an American university. He is also the first person of any ethnic minority to become president of a college or university in Georgia other than a Historically Black one.

== Personal ==
Sethna is a Parsi. He has been married for more than 38 years to Madhavi Sethna, a UWG faculty member who has earned her Ed.D. They have two children.
