= Robert M. Beall II =

American heir and businessman

- Born: Robert M. Beall II; United States
- Education: University of Florida; New York University Stern School of Business
- Occupation: Businessman
- Years active: 1960s–2020’s
- Employer: Bealls
- Known for: Chairman of Bealls
- Title: Chairman, Bealls
- Board member of: NextEra Energy; SunTrust Banks; Florida Blue; National Retail Federation

Robert M. Beall II is an American heir and businessman. He is the chairman of Bealls, a retail corporation of over 500 stores in the United States.

== Biography ==
=== Early life ===
His late grandfather, Robert M. Beall, Sr., founded Bealls. His father, E.R. Beall, joined the family business in 1940. He received a BSBA from the University of Florida in 1965 and was named a Distinguished Alumnus of the university in 2008. He went on to receive an M.B.A. from the New York University Stern School of Business in 1969. In 1965, he was initiated into the Alpha Phi chapter of Alpha Kappa Psi.

=== Career ===
He served as the chief executive officer of Bealls from 1994 to August 2006, and he has served as its chairman since 1994.

He is a former chairman of the Florida Chamber of Commerce. He sits on the Board of Directors of NextEra Energy since 1989, FPL Group since 1989, SunTrust Banks since 2004, the Blue Cross Blue Shield Association of Florida, and the National Retail Federation. He has served on the Florida Council of 100.
