= Robert Beale =

Robert or Bobby Beale may refer to:

- Robert Beale (diplomat) (1541–1601), English diplomat, government official and antiquary
- Robert Beale, Sergeant-at-Arms of the United States Senate, 1845–1853
- Bobby Beale (footballer) (1884–1950), English footballer
- Bobby Beale (EastEnders), fictional character in the BBC soap EastEnders
