= Alpha Kappa Psi =

Professional fraternity for business

- ΑΚΨ
- Founded: October 5, 1904; 122 years ago New York University
- Type: Professional
- Affiliation: PFA
- Former affiliation: PIC
- Status: Active
- Emphasis: Business
- Scope: International
- Pillars: Brotherhood, Knowledge, Integrity, Service, Unity
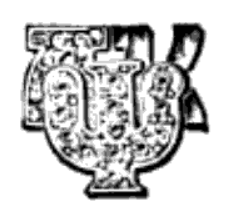
- Member badge
- Colors: Navy blue and Gold
- Symbol: Phoenician galley
- Flower: Yellow rose
- Jewel: Blue Sapphire
- Publication: The Diary of Alpha Kappa Psi
- Chapters: 263
- Members: 14,447 active 278,000+ lifetime
- Headquarters: 8001 E. 196th Street; Noblesville, Indiana 46062; United States
- Website: www.akpsi.org

Alpha Kappa Psi (ΑΚΨ, often stylized as AKPsi) is the oldest and largest business fraternity. The fraternity was founded in 1904 at New York University. It is headquartered in Noblesville, Indiana.

== History ==
During the winter months of the 1903–1904 academic year at New York University, the idea of starting a business fraternity was first brought up. One of the founding members later suggested that it was Frederic R. Leach who first developed the idea for formation of a fraternity. Leach and Jefferson, along with Nathan Lane Jr. and George L. Bergen, came to be known as the "Brooklyn Four". These men grew to be close friends while attending night classes, and they walked home together each night over the Brooklyn Bridge, hence their nickname. As the spirit of brotherhood grew stronger in the hearts and in the minds of the men from Brooklyn, they decided to suggest to the other members of their class that something be done to perpetuate it. They received hearty support from the men approached regarding their idea, and by the end of April 1904, things were beginning to take definite shape. Before the academic term came to a close, a date was set for a meeting to take place at the Hotel Saint Denis in which a plan for the organization would be outlined.

On June 9, 1904, The Brooklyn Four were joined at the Hotel St. Denis by Robert S. Douglas, Irving L. Camp, Daniel V. Duff, Morris S. Rachmil and Herbert M. Wright. William O. Tremaine was to be invited, but he was not in attendance at the meeting, as he later said that the invitation had never reached him. The nine men in attendance were all strongly in favor of forming a fraternity, and many points worthy of being incorporated into a constitution were suggested. The Brooklyn Four were appointed to draft a constitution and present it the next time all of the men met. On July 16, 1904, a group of them traveled by steamer to Sea Cliff, Long Island and, at this meeting, the draft of the constitution was presented. The social aspect of the fraternity was emphasized early on, as Jefferson later recounted, "The greater part of the day, however, was spent in having summer fun, and although the party did no real work on the constitution, yet the friendships were strengthened."

After university resumed in the fall, a meeting was held on October 5, 1904, in the assembly room at 32 Waverly Place. All ten men, including Tremaine, were present at the October 5 meeting, and the decision was made to officially organize the fraternity along the lines of the constitution that had been presented by the Brooklyn Four. On written ballots, Robert Douglas was elected president, Howard Jefferson was elected secretary and Nathan Lane Jr. was elected treasurer.

In spring 1905, a formal application was made to the State of New York for a charter of incorporation for Alpha Kappa Psi. The application was approved and the charter of incorporation of the Alpha chapter was officially issued in the name of Alpha Kappa Psi on May 20, 1905.

=== International expansion into Canada ===
Alpha Kappa Psi became an international fraternity on Saturday, April 18, 1931, when the Beta Kappa chapter was installed at the University of Western Ontario in London, Ontario. The ceremony was held at the Hotel London, and it was conducted by Grand President O. Arthur Kirkman, Grand Secretary-Treasurer J.D. Sparks, District Councilor J.R. Gabell and members of Phi chapter of the University of Michigan, Beta Theta chapter of Detroit College, and Beta Iota chapter of Buffalo.

=== Membership restrictions ===
Membership in Alpha Kappa Psi was originally restricted to men who were "of the Christian faith and Caucasian race". By 1950, the restrictive clause in the fraternity's constitution was beginning to stir controversy on some college campuses. At the 1950 Alpha Kappa Psi Convention in Minnesota, delegates voted 66–44 in favor of dropping the restrictive membership clause from the national constitution.

In June 1972, Title IX of the Education Amendments Act of 1972 was passed and it brought the beginning of the most significant change in the history of Alpha Kappa Psi. Title IX prohibited sex discrimination in federally assisted educational programs and amended parts of the Civil Rights Act of 1964. While social fraternities and sororities were exempt from the provisions of Title IX, professional fraternities were included. Around this time, the brothers of the Delta Chi chapter at Clarkson University introduced legislation to amend Alpha Kappa Psi's Constitution to include women as brothers. While this move did gain the support of a few other chapters, the proposed amendments were easily defeated. In fall 1973, the Delta Chi chapter admitted four women into their chapter and soon granted females full rights and privileges, including participation in ritual. Delta Chi went on to elect a female president and attempted to send her to the 1974 national convention as their voting delegate. As a result, Alpha Kappa Psi revoked the charter of the Delta Chi chapter. The chapter proceeded by changing its name to Delta Chi Delta aiming to be completely independent from its former counterpart. During the same year, the Alpha Kappa chapter at the University of Idaho also admitted women to membership. As a result, Alpha Kappa Psi also moved forward with disciplinary action against the Alpha Kappa chapter. Upon having their charter revoked, the former Alpha Kappa chapter continued as an independent organization known as Pi Beta Sigma, and the organization's advisor remarked, "My sentiments are that if we are being excommunicated from the national because we failed to discriminate against women, then it's a pleasure to get kicked out of that organization."

In December 1973, a complaint was filed with the Office of Civil Rights of the Department of Health, Education and Welfare against thirteen colleges and universities which recognized professional business fraternity chapters. In March 1973, representatives of several organizations formed to push for legislation that would exempt the groups from Title IX as it applied to professional fraternities. Out of these meetings, the Fraternal Alliance for Inalienable Rights (FAIR) was formed, which included Alpha Kappa Psi. FAIR was an inter-fraternity organization designed to seek legislative relief from Title IX. In October 1975, Alpha Kappa Psi initiated a fund drive to combat Title IX. A write-in campaign was also started as an attempt to sway legislators. At the national convention, the Committee on Female Membership moved that the fraternity should bar women, advocating a continuance of the struggle to secure legislation. Such legislation was eventually introduced in 1976, when Senator James McClure sponsored an amendment to S. 2657 of the Education Amendments of 1976 that would have limited the meaning of "education program or activity" to "the curriculum or graduation requirements of the institutions". Senator Birch Bayh led an opposition that defeated the amendment. The 1975 convention voted the board of directors the authority to change Article III, Section 1 of the Constitution by deletion of the words "must be men and", if no legislative recourse could be achieved. When it became apparent that legislation would not be approved, the board of directors voted, on August 7, 1976, to admit women into the fraternity.

=== International expansion ===
In March 2000, the board of directors of AKPsi approved expansion of the fraternity into the United Kingdom. In 2001, chapters were installed at the University of Manchester Institute of Science and Technology (UMIST), University of Manchester, and Manchester Metropolitan University. In 2004, UMIST merged with University of Manchester and, at around the same time, the chapter at Manchester Metropolitan closed, leaving only one university chapter remaining in the UK. On March 25, 2017, Chi Eta (XH) chapter was chartered at Queen Mary University of London but has since closed.

== Symbols ==
Alpha Kappa Psi's core values or pillars are Brotherhood, Knowledge, Integrity, Service, and Unity. Its colors are blue and gold. Its flower is the yellow rose. Its jewel is the blue sapphire.

=== Publications ===
The official magazine of the fraternity first appeared on January 1, 1908, as The Alpha Diary. The name was changed in 1913 to The Diary of Alpha Kappa Psi Fraternity to reflect its new fraternity-wide scope. In 1917, the title was changed to The Alpha Kappa Psi Diary. In 1929, the magazine adopted the name The Diary of Alpha Kappa Psi. The Diary is published three times a year by the Alpha Kappa Psi Foundation.

The Handbook of Alpha Kappa Psi is a comprehensive information source and guide for members and officers of the fraternity. It was first published fraternity-wide in 1934, and it has been followed by several more comprehensive and revised editions. The seventh edition was published in 1997

=== Anthem ===
Tune: Auld Lang Syne

Should old acquaintance be forgot,

And Alpha Kappa Psi?
Shall we pass slowly out of view
Without regret or sigh?

For Alpha Kappa Psi,
my friend,
For Alpha Kappa Psi,
We'll bless the days that we have spent
in Alpha Kappa Psi.

We'll work with might and main to win
Our meed of daily praise,
But ne'er shall we in after years
Forget fraternal days.

For Alpha Kappa Psi,
my friend,
For Alpha Kappa Psi,
We'll bless the days that we have spent

in Alpha Kappa Psi.

== Governance ==
Alpha Kappa Psi is managed by fraternity volunteers.

=== Board of directors ===
The board of directors is the supreme legislative, judicial and oversight body of the fraternity outside of meetings of the chapter congress (held every two years at the convention). The board was originally known as the grand council, and it was made up of the president, vice presidents and regional directors. In 1959, the term "board of directors" replaced "grand council." In 1995, the present-day structure of the board was formed and the president, vice presidents, and regional director positions were moved out of the board and over to the national management team. The board of directors is now made up of nine alumni, elected for three-year terms, staggering three elected each year. BOD officers are the board chair, vice chair, the secretary, and the treasurer. The chair of the board position is now the highest-ranking officer position of Alpha Kappa Psi, equivalent to the former national president position prior to 1995 and grand president position prior to 1959. As of August 2025, the chair of the board is Jane Azzinaro, re-elected to her second and final term for 2026-2027.

=== Management Team ===
The Management Team is made up of the elected and appointed executive-level operational leadership of the fraternity. This body was known as the grand council until 1959, when it became known as the board of directors. In 1995, a separate board of directors was formed, so the president, vice presidents and regional directors then became known as the national management team. In 2005 "National" was dropped from the title to reflect the fraternity's international scope, even though the fraternity has actually been international since 1931. Members of the Management Team as of April 1, 2024 include the fraternity president, executive vice president, and four regional directors of volunteer development. The head of the management team is the fraternity president.

- Fraternity President. A fraternity officer, the president is the presiding officer at all meetings of the chapter congress and the management team and has general supervision, direction and control of the business and affairs of the fraternity subject to the direction of the board of directors. The 2026-2028 fraternity president is Jacob Drees.
- Fraternity Executive Vice President. A fraternity officer, the executive vice president (EVP) assists the president and has such other duties as the president may direct. In the absence of the president, the EVP shall serve as president of the fraternity until such time the president can resume his or her duties or until the term of the president's office has expired if the president is permanently unable to resume his or her duties. The EVP constitutionally serves as the director of the alumni chapter region of Alpha Kappa Psi. The 2026-2028 fraternity EVP is Nicole Nourvle.
- Regional Director of Volunteer Development (4). Appointed jointly by the fraternity president and the CEO, with approval by the board of directors. Regional Directors of Volunteer Development focus on the Volunteer Development Process in recruiting, onboarding, and delivering training materials to chapter advisors.

=== Other volunteer roles ===
- Program Manager of Chapter Achievement (12). The PM-CAs focus on coaching and mentoring chapter advisors who work with student officers utilizing the Chapter Achievement Pathway process and chapter operations resources. Chapters are organized into twelve districts, with an approximately equal number of chapters working with one of the PM-CAs.
- Chapter Advisor. Responsible for the proper conduct of the college chapter in all local, regional and fraternity matters, and is accountable to the regional director. In that advisory and representative capacity, it is the chapter advisor's duty to report to the regional director any violations of the laws or policies of the fraternity within the college chapter. The chapter advisor is the front-line and most important position in AKPsi, as it has been proved that chapters with a long-term and involved advisor succeed more.

=== Foundation Board of Trustees Executive Committee ===
The foundation board of trustees executive committee (FBOTEC) manages the Alpha Kappa Psi Foundation. The Alpha Kappa Psi Foundation was established in 1951 as a public, charitable and educational foundation. Its mission is "Providing resources for enhancing the educational experience of future business leaders". The foundation annually distributes more than 30 grants and scholarships to undergraduate and graduate students. It also supports educational programs that develop leadership and professional development skills. The foundation also publishes The Diary of Alpha Kappa Psi. The current Chair of the Executive Committee is Alison Jennings.

=== Professional staff ===
In 1923, Alpha Kappa Psi became the first professional fraternity to have a headquarters facility and, since then, has moved from location to location as the fraternity grew. Today, AKPsi occupies a building near Indianapolis that is the headquarters for both the Alpha Kappa Psi Fraternity and Alpha Kappa Psi Foundation. The two corporations were operating from the Heritage Center from April 2005 until 2021, when they moved to the new Howell + Wendroff Professional Center, which was dedicated in March 2022. The members of the professional staff of Alpha Kappa Psi are the fraternity's only full-time paid employees. Working collaboratively with the members of the fraternity management team, the fraternity office staff are a source of input, advice and feedback to the board of directors, and implements programs in the areas of education, marketing, membership growth and general fraternal development for students, alumni and volunteers. C. Steven Hartman was appointed Chief Executive Officer in 2013.

== Activities ==
=== Principled Business Leadership Institute ===
The Principled Business Leadership Institute (PBLI) is an annual weekend program held each February in five cities across the United States. PBLI offers several curriculum tracks, facilitated by a mix of Alpha Kappa Psi alumni and successful business leaders, focusing on the values of principles business leadership. In addition to the educational leadership development tracks, the fraternity's Case Competition also takes place during PBLI. PBLI began in 2009 as a retooled and updated version of the fraternity's similar Success Institute, which was originally introduced in 1996.

=== Case Competition ===
Alpha Kappa Psi began holding the annual Case Competition at the 2008 Success Institutes. Case Competition is sponsored by the Alpha Kappa Psi Foundation and it awards $1,500, $750 and $500 scholarships to the top three teams in each of the five cities where the annual competition takes place. Case Competition is designed to introduce students to the realities of decision making and give them first-hand experience in analyzing business situations to prepare them for future managerial decision making.

=== College of Leadership ===
The College of Leadership is held every two years in conjunction with the fraternity's convention. The College of Leadership is a two-day series of sessions focusing on personal development, professional development and chapter leadership. Facilitators include fraternity staff and volunteer leaders, successful alumni members and special guests from the business community.

=== The Academy ===
The Academy is an all-expense-paid leadership conference sponsored by the Alpha Kappa Psi Foundation. The Academy is held each summer at the Waycross Conference and Retreat Center in Morgantown, Indiana, and attendance is limited to 20 exceptional student leaders who demonstrate qualities of future business leaders. The Academy was first held in 2001.

== Chapters ==
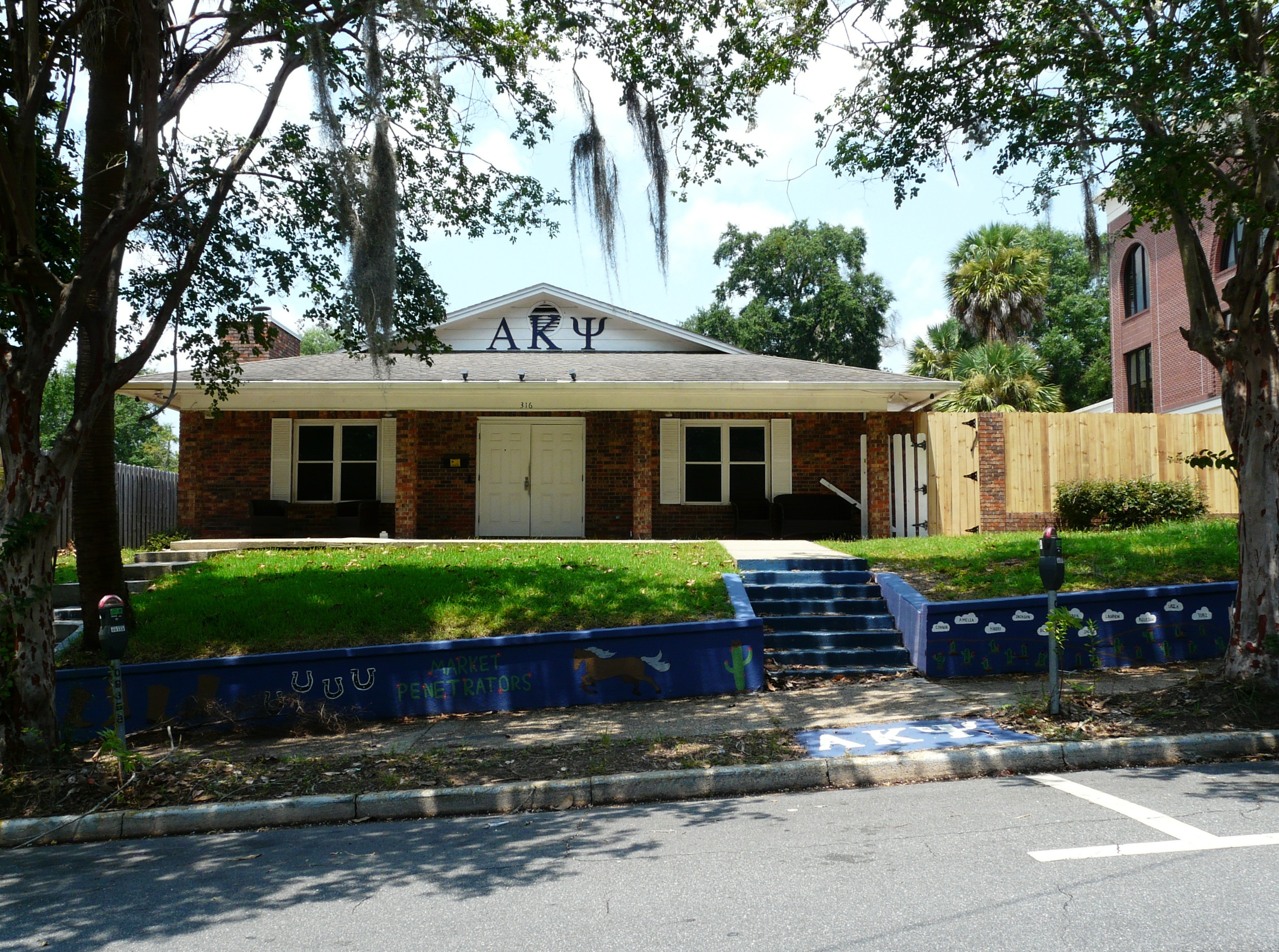
Beta Psi Chapter in Tallahassee, Florida

Alpha Kappa Psi has charted 354 chapters since its founding. As of 2025, it has 263 active chapters.

== Notable members ==
Members of Alpha Kappa Psi have held almost every major political position in the United States, including the presidency and vice-presidency. Many members have gained notable positions on boards of directors and executive management teams of some of the world's most well known companies. Notable alumni include Ronald Reagan (former U.S. President), Richard Nixon (former U.S. President), Joyce C. Hall (founder, Hallmark Cards), Samuel F. Hinkle (president, The Hershey Company), and Harrison Jones (chairman, The Coca-Cola Company).

== See also ==
- Professional fraternities and sororities
