= List of Russia-flagged cargo ships =

This list of Russia-flagged cargo ships consists of vessels which are registered in Russia (or the Soviet Union) and subject to the laws of that country. Any ship which flew the flag at any point in its career, and is present in the encyclopedia, is listed here.

== List of ships ==
Name	Owner	Year built	Type	Tonnage	Status
Baltic Leader	Promsvyazbank	2000	Ro-ro	8,831	In active service
Captain Kurbatskiy	Far East Shipping Company	1983	SA-15 type	18,627	Scrapped in 2011
Grigory Lovtsov		2002	Ro-ro	272	Stuck in ice and lost in the Shantar Islands in January 2022
Kapitan Man	Far East Shipping Company	1985	SA-15 type	18,574 GT	Scrapped in 2012
Kuzma Minin	Murmansk Shipping Company	1980	Bulk carrier	23,169	Scrapped in 2020
Liberty			General cargo	226	Sunk as artificial reef south of Cyprus on 22 May 2009
Matros Pozynich	Crane Marine Contractors	2010	Bulk carrier	17,025	In active service
Monchegorsk	Murmansk Shipping Company	1983	SA-15 type	18,627 GT	Scrapped in 2009
Omskiy-205	Marship	1993	Omskiy type	2,958	In active service
Palflot-2		1981	Oil tanker	2,015	Caught fire in the Caspian Sea in April 2016
Petrozavodsk	Karelian Sg Company	1978	Reefer	1,130	Ran aground off Bear Island, Norway, in May 2009
Phoenix	Shelikhov-Golikov Company	1794	Sailing ship	~200	Lost at sea in 1799
Ryazan	Russian merchant fleet	1909	Passenger-cargo	3,500	Scuttled by German Navy while in Guam following the entrance of the United States into World War I in 1917
SMP Novodvinsk	Northern Shipping Company	2008	General cargo	4,106	In active service
Tibor Szamueli	V/O Sudoimport	1979	Barge carrier	35,817	Scrapped in 2003
Yulius Fuchik	V/O Sudoimport	1979	Barge carrier	35,817	Scrapped in 2003
Zhibek Zholy	KTZ Express JSC	2016	Bulk carrier	5,686	In active service

== List of classes ==
Name	Years built	Type	Number in class	Notes
Omskiy type	1972–1995	Dry cargo ships	~140	
SA-15 type	1982–1987	Icebreaking cargo ships	19	Also known as Norilsk class
