= Torkan (disambiguation) =

Torkan or Turkan may refer to:

- Torkan (surname)
- Türkan, Azerbaijan
- Torkan, Afghanistan
- Turgan Valley, Afghanistan
- Torkan, Fars, Iran
- Torkan, Kerman, Iran
- Torkan, Sirjan, Kerman Province, Iran
- Torkan, Qazvin, Iran
- Torkan, West Azerbaijan, Iran
- Torkan, Yazd, Yazd
- Torkan, a comic strip
