= Türkan (disambiguation) =

Türkan is a settlement and municipality in Baku, Azerbaijan.

Türkan may also refer to:

- Turkan, the land of the Turkana people
- Türkan (name), given name

== People with the given name ==
- Türkan Hanımsultan (1919-1989), Ottoman princess
- Türkân Akyol (1928–2017), Turkish politician and former government minister
- Türkan Erişmiş (born 1984), Turkish middle-distance runner
- Türkan Feyzullah (1983–1984), female murder victim
- Türkan Haliloğlu, Turkish biochemist
- Türkan Örs Baştuğ (1900–1975), Turkish school teacher, politician and one of the first (1915–2007), first ever Turkish professor of jurisprudence female members of the parliament
- Türkan Rado (1915–2007), first ever Turkish female professor of jurisprudence
- Türkan Saylan (1935–2009), Turkish physician
- Türkan Şoray (born 1945), Turkish film actress

== See also ==
- Torkan (disambiguation)
- Turkan (disambiguation)
