= Türkan (name) =

Türkan is a Turkish female given name that means princess and title of nobility.

== Given Name ==
- Türkan Hanımsultan (1919-1989), Ottoman princess
- Türkân Akyol (1928–2017), Turkish politician and former government minister
- Türkan Erişmiş (born 1984), Turkish middle-distance runner
- Türkan Feyzullah (1983–1984), female murder victim
- Türkan Haliloğlu, Turkish biochemist
- Türkan Örs Baştuğ (1900–1975), Turkish school teacher, politician and one of the first female members of the parliament
- Türkan Rado (1915–2007), first ever Turkish female professor of jurisprudence
- Türkan Saylan (1935–2009), Turkish physician
- Türkan Şoray (born 1945), Turkish film actress
