= Jibek Joly =

Jibek Joly or Zhibek Zholy (Silk Road in Kazakh language) may refer to:

- Jibek Joly Street, a street in Almaty, Kazakhstan
- Jibek Joly (Almaty Metro), a station of Line 1 of the Almaty Metro
- Jibek Joly, Akmora Region (formerly Aleksandrova), a village in Akmola Region, Kazakhstan
- Jibek Joly, Saryagash District (formerly Chernyaevka), a village in Turkistan Region, Kazakhstan
- MV Zhibek Zholy, a Russian bulk carrier cargo ship
- Jibek Joly TV, a TV channel in Kazakhstan
