= Climate resources of Azerbaijan Republic =

Potential of using of climatic resources, including solar and wind energy is large in Azerbaijan, despite that the share of these resources within energy production is still small.

== Solar energy ==
The possibility of use of solar energy is large in Azerbaijan Republic due to wide climatic resources and advantageous agroclimatic potential of the country. The quantitative indicators of sunny hours are sufficient in the country. The yearly amount of sunny hours is 1800-2900 in Azerbaijan. The highest indicator is typical for the territory of the Autonomous Republic of Nakhchivan, reaching up to 2900 hours a year. The Kura-Araz lowland, Jeyranchol area, and the peninsula of Absheron are the territories with 2200-2400 sunny hours. The amount of solar radiation is also favorable, hesitating by regions from 125 to 150 kcal per sq. centimeter. It is 125-134 kcal per sq. cm in the Kura-Araz and Lankaran lowlands. The highest figure is in Nakhchivan (145-160 kcal per sq. cm).

Sumgait-located AzgunTech plant, constructed by State Company of Alternative and Renewable Energy Sources, operates since 2012. This firstly commissioned High-Tech Park in the country produces sun panels and LED lamps. Each module of solar panels in the plant has 60 solar cells with capacity of 42-250 watts. Production is also relevant to the project named "Thousand houses - thousand plants" designed for the housing sector, and is to provide installation of solar panels on housing buildings. It is expected that the capacity of the plant will make 240 thousand solar panels a year in the future. Production of solar batteries in Sumgait is expected to be realized, too. Besides with these, the plant will produce 36 million LED chips and 12 million diode lamps a year.

== Wind energy ==
It is estimated that in Azerbaijan, natural and geographical condition, and also economic infrastructure may allow to produce 800 mWt of energy a year at the expense of wind power. This is equivalent to an electric energy of 2,4 billion kWt/hour. The best condition for developing wind power industry is on northwestern part of the Caspian Sea. Historically, a lot of windmills have been constructed in the territory of Azerbaijan, particularly in Absheron peninsula with the purpose of using drinking waters of wells. This method is currently used in some places of the peninsula.

Taking into consideration the power, directions, and continuation of winds as well as possibilities of taking advantage of wind energy, the two zones may be differed in the territory of country.

The first zone covers territories of Siyazan, Khizi, Absheron, Gobustan, Neftchala, Salyan, including the mouth of Kura River. This large area is dominated by northern and partially dillag northwestern winds. The speed of Nord (northern winds) is up to 8–10 m/s. In this strip zone from Siyazan to the point of Alat, the yearly number of wind-blowing hours reaches 2000-2200. The average speed of wind reaches 6–9 m/s in Absheron peninsula where the annual number of wind-blowing days reaches 245-280. At least 8-10% of the territory of Absheron is reliable for installation of wind turbines. There are great possibilities for development of wind farms also in the islands of the Caspian Sea, the number of which is 50 as well as the territories of Khachmaz, Masalli, and less-populated Gobustan. The second winds-dominated zone encompasses Jeyranchol Plateau, the regions of Ganjabasar, Goranboy, Terter and surrounding areas where northwestern winds are dominant. Creation of wind power plants in these territories would be effective particularly due to plenty sunny hours of spring and winter.

Ganja-Dashkasan region, and also the administrative areas of Sharur and Julfa, located in Autonomous Republic of Nakhchivan are favorable territories areas for construction of wind farm due to the dominant winds average yearly speed of which make up 3–5 m/s. The last indicator is advantageous for operation of wind stations of medium power. The average yearly speed of winds in the Great Caucasus is 0,8-2,3 m/s as well as 1,8-2,4 m/s in Lankaran-Astara, and 1,9-2,7 m/s in Karabagh and other territories of the Lesser Caucasus. These indicators and the carried out analysis give a basis to suggest about efficiency of using wind power chiefly in Absheron, Gobustan, Siyazan, and the adjacent Pre-Caspian territories, and also northwestern part of Azerbaijan – Enke-boyugusu-Goranboy-Jeyranchol zone. Moreover, it is favorable also in term of efficient land use, because the both mentioned zones have not fertile soils, and therefore, are less-populated and suitable areas for allocation of wind generators.

In order to use alternative energy, the construction of hybrid polygon is underway in Maraza settlement of Gobustan. The polygon operates at the expense of not only wind and sunbeam but also biomass. By 2012, 2,7 mWt of energy is produced due to wind power, 2,0 mWt of energy is gained by using sunbeam as well as 1,0 mWt from biomass. The polygon will provide Gobustan region with electricity in the future. The creation of Sea Wind Farm in the Caspian Sea, estimated at €250 million is to be invested by non-state entities and the government in the future.
