= Absheron's stone roads =

- Abşeronun daş yolları (Azerbaijani)
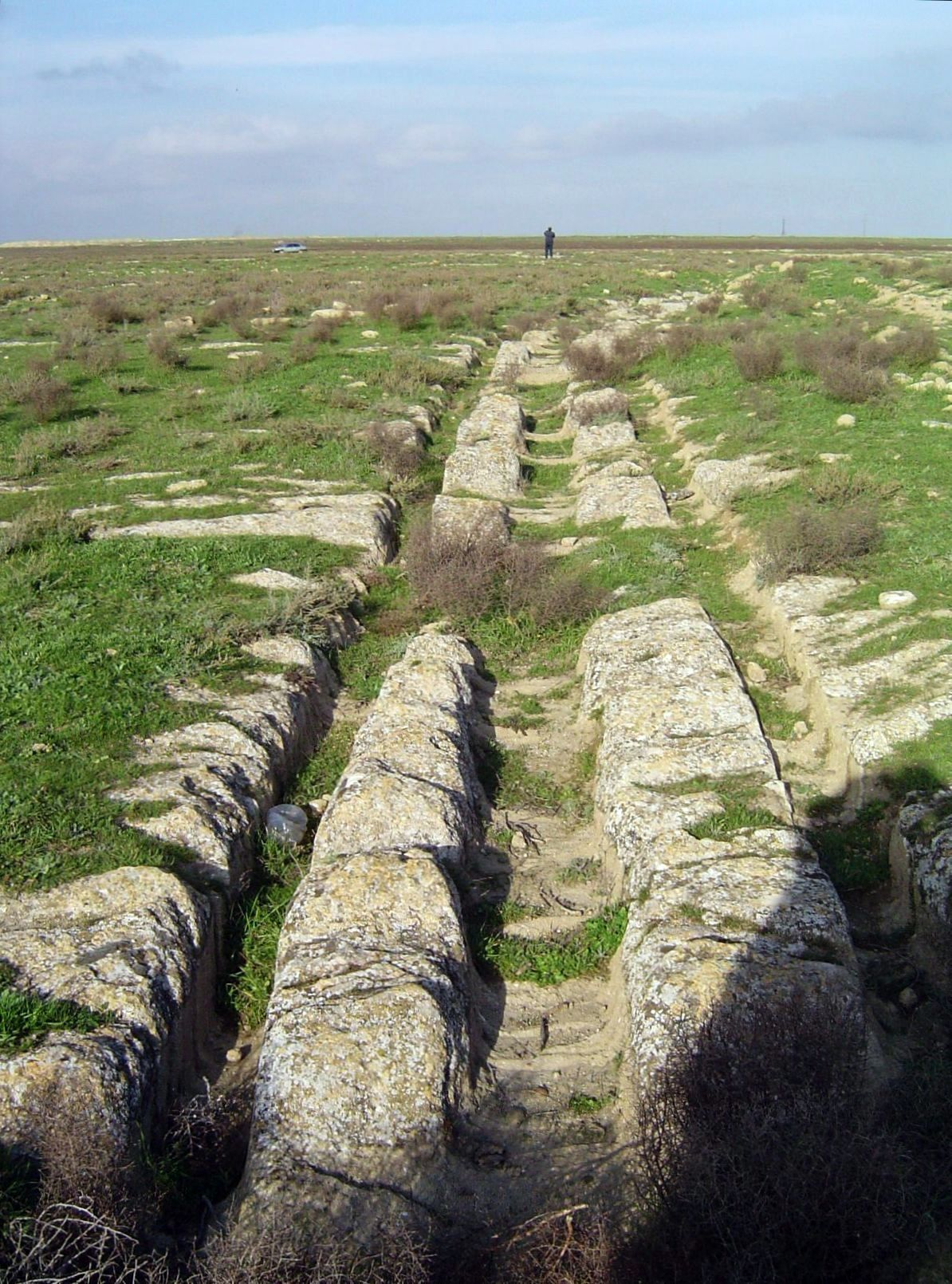
- Roads recorded by Faig Nasibov
- Type: stone roads
- Location: Absheron Peninsula, Azerbaijan

Absheron's stone roads, or cart ruts of Absheron, are situated around the towns of Turkan, Hovsan, Nardaran, Dubandi, Qala, and Surakhani on the Absheron Peninsula in Azerbaijan.

Throughout history, historians like Abbasgulu agha Bakikhanov and Sara Ashurbeyli have written about these roads.

== Background and details ==
The determination of the purpose of discovered stone roads in the world remains a mystery for the world. Researchers have put forward various versions regarding this matter. In international scientific sources, these stone roads are mentioned as "stone car roads." However, based on certain parameters of these stone roads, including the number of grooves, depth, and width, it appears they might not be suitable for carriage wheels. In some places, the depth of these stone roads even reaches half a meter. Additionally, there are various theories regarding the time these stone roads were constructed.

In the 20th century, stone roads were discovered in the "Kurgan Desert" located between Hovsan and Turkan, later extending around Dubandi, Gala, and Surakhani. It is said that previously, there were several such roads in the Cascade Park behind the Cabinet of Ministers in Baku.

The stone roads in Absheron pass through areas close to ancient graves and temples, similar to ancient stone roads found around the Mediterranean and the Arabian Sea. The stone roads around Turkan pass near mounds dating back to the 3rd–2nd millennia BCE and areas where ancient settlements existed. The stone roads in Dubandi extend towards the Pirallahi Island. Similarly, close to the Nardaran shrine and the Bibiheybat pilgrimage site, these stone roads can also be found. Only remnants of stone roads can be traced near the Maiden Tower.

One significant similarity between the roads in Malta and Absheron is that both extend towards the sea. Some parts of the stone roads on the islands and shores of the Arabian Sea extend towards the sea, remaining underwater and continuing at considerable depths beneath the sea surface. This indicates that these stone roads were created during a period when the sea and ocean levels were much lower. Furthermore, the resemblance and the alignment of the roads situated both in the Arabian Sea and the Caspian Sea suggest that they were created around the same era. Researchers in Malta have noted that the roads there were created in the 5th to 4th millennia BCE.

== Historical and modern accounts ==
In written sources, the first information about Absheron's stone roads was noted by the academician Lents in 1830 in Baku. While researching Big Zire Island, he describes the stone roads, marked by carved grooves in the rocks. He notes that these stone roads extend towards the village of Shikh, or towards the southernmost point of the Baku bay, reaching the water's edge.

Previously, Abbasgulu Bakikhanov, who was part of the archaeological group, also wrote about the stone roads. He wrote:

In the district of Baku, traces of wheels extending to the sea can be seen on rocks in places like Bilgeh, Zire, Bibiheybat, and other villages, as well as on some islands.

Historian Sara Ashurbeyli also noted the presence of two-wheeled stone roads extending towards the sea on the Umid cape, located near the villages of Bilgeh and Nardaran.

== Destruction of stone roads ==
Construction activities and stone quarries in the area have inadvertently destroyed ancient stone roads which are not officially registered as archaeological landmarks.

In June 2022, stone roads located near the Kurgan Desert and the Turkan Settlement were disrupted by a company conducting work in the area. Following this incident, in July, the Minister of Culture of Azerbaijan, Anar Karimov, conducted an inspection of the "Kurgan Desert," "Turkan Settlement," and the historical stone roads, issuing directives for their preservation. Protective measures were taken around the remaining intact stone roads.
