= MT Kotlas =

History
- Name: Kotlas
- Operator: Murmansk Shipping Company
- Port of registry: Murmansk, Russia
- Builder: Valmet Lajva Teollisus
- Completed: 1989

General characteristics
- Type: Single-hull tanker
- Tonnage: 2,968 gt
- Length: 97.35 metres (319.4 ft)
- Beam: 14.23 metres (46.7 ft)
- Draught: 4.3 metres (14 ft)
- Depth: 6.5 metres (21 ft)
- Decks: 1
- Speed: 6.6 kn

Kotlas (Russian: Котлас) is a product tanker, registered in Murmansk, Russia. It operates for the Murmansk Shipping Company and transports oil products around northern Russia and northern Europe.

== Description ==
The single-hull ship was completed in February 1989 by Valmet of Turku, Finland, and measures 97.35 metres (319.4 ft) by 14.23 metres (46.7 ft) with a gross tonnage of 2,968 tonnes. The ship is registered in Murmansk and is operated by the Murmansk Shipping Company.
