= MT Palflot-2 =

Russian oil tanker

History

Russian
- Name: Palflot-2
- Port of registry: Taganrog, Russia
- Launched: 1981
- Identification: IMO number: 8952247; MMSI number: 273455220; Callsign: UHXF
- Fate: Caught fire in the Caspian Sea in April 2016

General characteristics
- Class & type: Oil tanker
- Tonnage: 2,858 DWT; 2,015 GT
- Length: 108.6 m (356 ft 4 in)
- Beam: 15 m (49 ft 3 in)
- Draft: 2.5 m (8 ft 2 in)
- Speed: 6.7 kn
- Crew: 11

MT Palflot-2 was a Russian oil tanker that caught fire in the Caspian Sea in April 2016.

== Description ==
Palflot-2 had an overall length of 108.6 m (356 ft), a beam of 15 m (49 ft), and a draft of 2.5 m (8.2 ft). It had a deadweight tonnage of 2,858 DWT and a gross tonnage of 2,015 GT. Its average speed was 6.7 knots and its maximum speed was 10.8 knots. It was manned by a crew of eleven.

== History ==
On 23 April 2016, Palflot-2 was underway from Dubandi, Azerbaijan, towards Alaja, Turkmenistan. It was not carrying any oil at the time, and its tanks were filled with seawater ballast. After entering the territorial waters of Turkmenistan, a fire started on the deck of the vessel and quickly grew. The fire killed the ship's mechanic and forced the crew to evacuate on another vessel, leaving Palflot-2 drifting roughly 800 km (500 mi) from the nearest Russian port of Astrakhan. Helicopters and other vessels were deployed from Turkmenistan to fight the fire, which was extinguished after a few hours. The tanker was then towed back to Baku, and its rescued crew were taken to Astrakhan. The Russian Embassy in Turkmenistan send a letter of gratitude to its Ministry of Foreign Affairs expressing appreciation for Turkmen assistance with the maritime incident.
