= Torkan (surname) =

Torkan (Persian: تُركان) is an Iranian surname. Notable people with the surname include:

- Akbar Torkan, Iranian mechanical engineer and politician
- Majid Torkan (born 1964), Iranian freestyle wrestler

== See also ==
- Türkan (disambiguation)
