= SMP Novodvinsk =

Russian general cargo ship

History

Russian
- Name: CFL Prudence (2008–2019); Prudence (2019–2021); SMP Novodvinsk (2021– )
- Owner: Joint Stock Company Northern Shipping Company
- Port of registry: Arkhangelsk, Russia
- Laid down: 27 June 2002
- Launched: 27 May 2008
- Identification: IMO number: 9398046; MMSI number: 273298320; Callsign: UBNV6

General characteristics
- Class & type: General cargo ship
- Tonnage: 6,500 DWT; 4,106 GT
- Length: 118.4 m (388 ft 5 in)
- Beam: 33.4 m (109 ft 7 in)
- Draft: 4.1 m (13 ft 5 in)
- Crew: 9

SMP Novodvinsk is a Russian general cargo ship which ran aground and was detained in Szczecin, Poland, following the outbreak of the 2022 Russian invasion of Ukraine in February 2022.

== Description ==
Novodvinsk is a general cargo ship with a tonnage of 6,500 DWT and a gross tonnage of 4,106 GT, a length of 118.4 metres (388 ft 5 in), a beam of 33.4 metres (109 ft 7 in), and a draft of 4.1 metres (13 ft 5 in). The ship's main engine provides 2,040 kW of power, allowing for a maximum speed of 11.5 kn unloaded and 10 kn loaded. It has two holds with a total capacity of 7,923 cubic metres (279,800 ft^{3}) or 256 twenty-foot equivalent units.

Novodvinsk was built with the same specifications as SMP Severodvinsk which was constructed the year prior.

== History ==
Novodvinsk was first laid down on 27 June 2002, and was launched on 27 May 2008.

=== Grounding ===
On 12 January 2022, Novodvinsk ran aground in Szczecin, Poland, while approaching the port with a cargo of scrap metal. According to the Szczecin Maritime Office, the ship ran aground away from the main line of traffic into the port, and was not an obstacle to other maritime traffic. None of the nine Russian crewmembers were injured in the incident.

After two weeks, the vessel was still grounded, with no plans to remove it from its location. Only one attempt by the tug Centaur II from the port was made to dislodge Novodvinsk shortly after the incident. However, the shipowner claimed that the ship was being unloaded in an attempt to refloat it, and that the crew had ample food, water, and the ship was stable. By 11 February, enough tonnage had been removed from the ship that it dislodged and refloated. It was accompanied by two tugs into the port of Szczecin, where it continued to unload and was inspected for environmental hazards. With none found, it continued to the Gryfia Marine Repair Shipyard, which it reached on 18 February.

While Novodvinsk was still undergoing repairs, on 8 March, the Gryfia shipyard announced that the ship was being detained in response to the 2022 Russian invasion of Ukraine. Reportedly, Ukrainian workers refused to unload the ship, and Polish workers were also reluctant. Work stopped on the ship, but it was released ten days later, on 18 March, and allowed to sail for St. Petersburg.

=== Sanctions ===
On 8 May, 2022, the United States Department of State designated several Russian maritime companies and the ships they operated as a part of the Department of the Treasury's List of Specially Designated Nationals and Blocked Persons, sanctioning them for their involvement in transporting war materiel during the 2022 Russian invasion of Ukraine. Novodvinsk, one of 27 ships owned by the Joint Stock Company Northern Shipping Company, was among those designated by the Department of State and sanctioned as a part of those actions.
