= Gyllyngvase =

Beach in Falmouth, Cornwall, England

Coordinates: 50°08′43″N 5°04′10″W

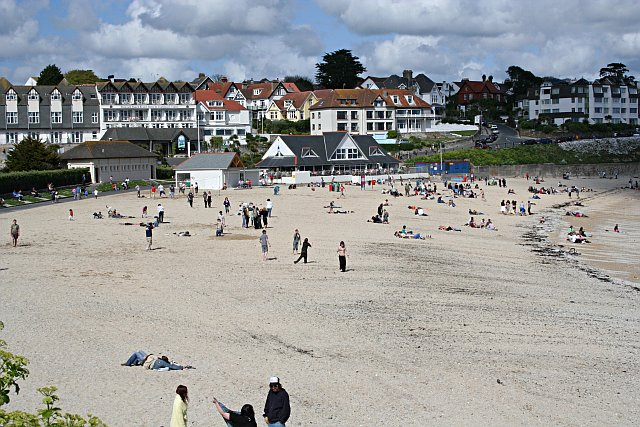
Gyllyngvase beach

Gyllyngvase (/ˈɡɪlɪŋveɪz/; Cornish: An Gilen Vas, meaning the shallow inlet) is one of the four beaches associated with Falmouth, Cornwall, England, in the United Kingdom, and is west of Pendennis Castle.

It is to the south of Falmouth town centre, but was an essentially rural area as recently as the late 19th century. However, the growth of tourism in the town at around the turn of the 20th century saw the area become more built-up and the seafront on Cliff Road became home to several major hotels.

The Bay Hotel opened in 1909 halfway along Cliff Road, but closed due to a fire in 1990 and was demolished three years later. Bay Court, a four-storey block of private apartments, was built on the site. Queen Mary Gardens were opened next to Gyllngvase Beach in 1910.

Palm Beach Hotel, built in the 1930s, was demolished in 2007. It overlooked Queen Mary Gardens and had closed several years earlier, having been attacked by vandals and arsonists after its closure. On 30 April 2012 the Falmouth Beach Hotel was devastated by a fire which broke out on the third floor, which caused the roof to collapse and significant damage to the building. The blaze was tackled by some 100 fire fighters.

A Russian bulk carrier, the MV Kuzma Minin, ran aground off Gyllyngvase on 18 December 2018, and was refloated the same day.

The beach at Gyllngvase is wide crescent shaped, gently shelving sandy beach with rockpools to explore and is popular year-round with bathers due to the generally calm conditions. It is also the home of Gyllyngvase Surf Life Saving Club (Gylly SLSC) founded in 2008. The beach has RNLI lifeguard cover in the summer months with some additional out of hours (early evening) cover provided by volunteers from Gylly SLSC in the summer and often during the June and October school half term holidays.

== Gallery ==
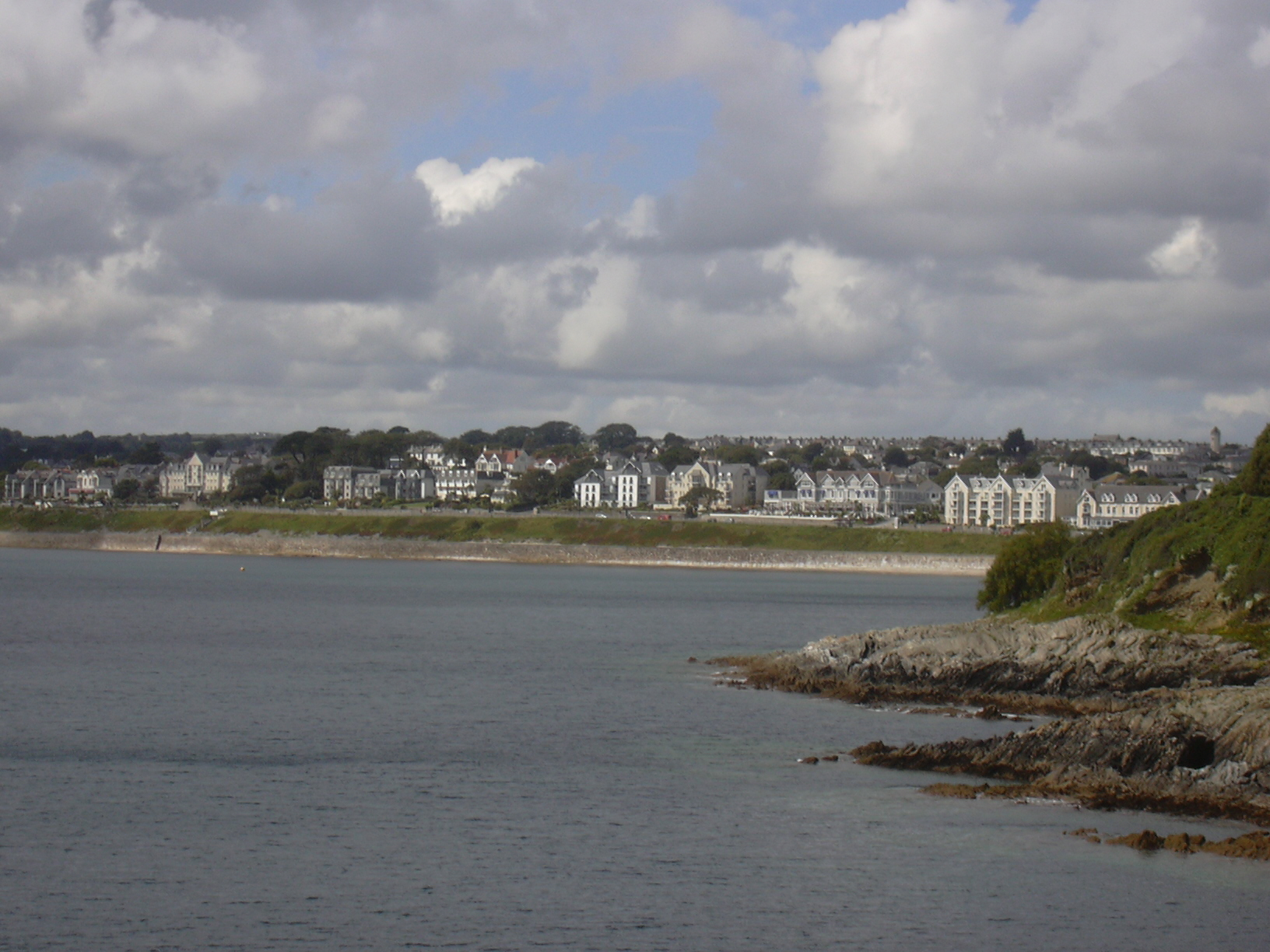
Gyllyngvase beach and hotels, viewed from Pendennis Head.

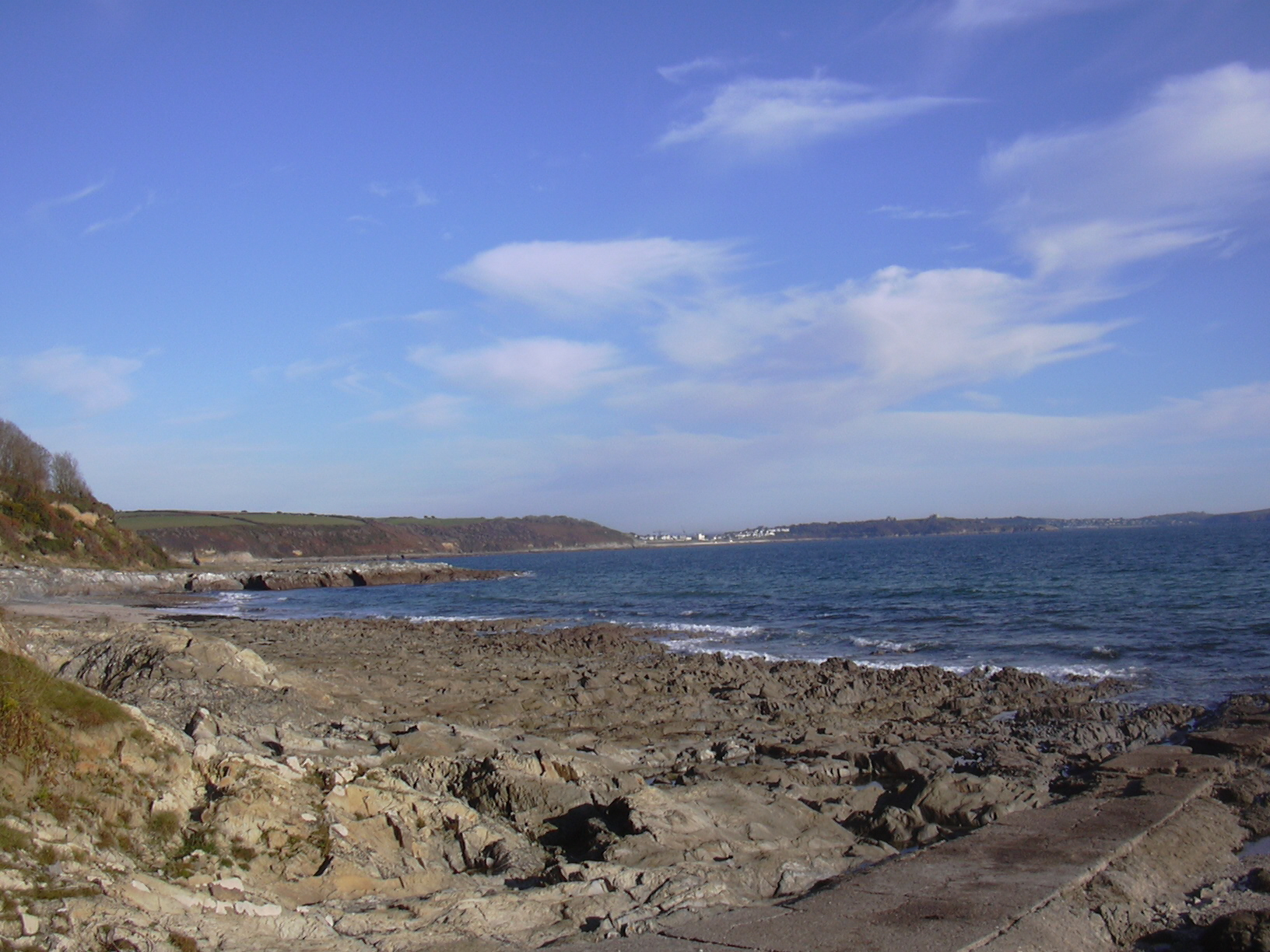
Gyllyngvase from Nansidwell.

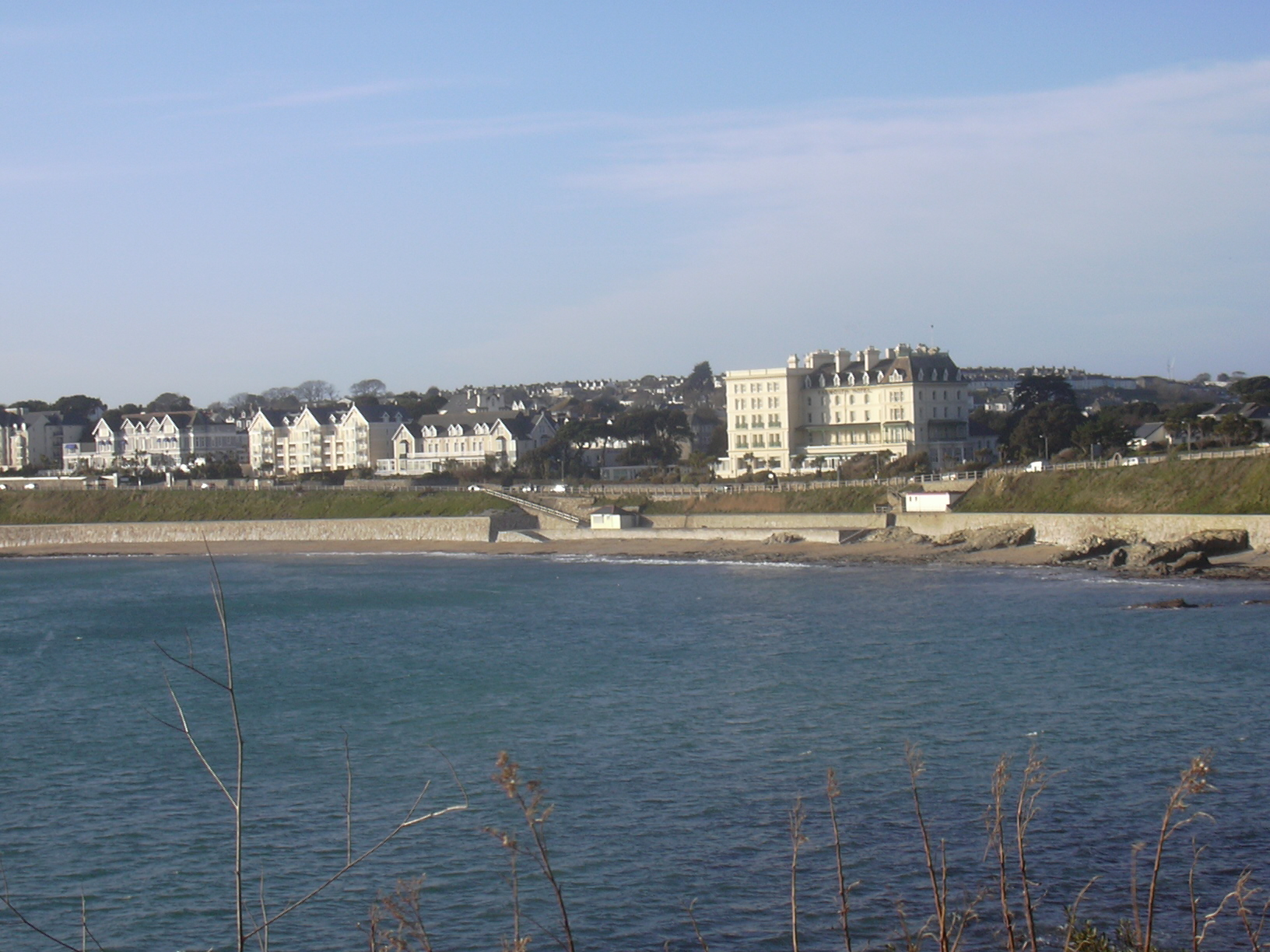
Falmouth Hotel, Gyllyngvase, from Castle Drive.
