= Shah Spit =

Peninsulas of Azerbaijan

- Spit
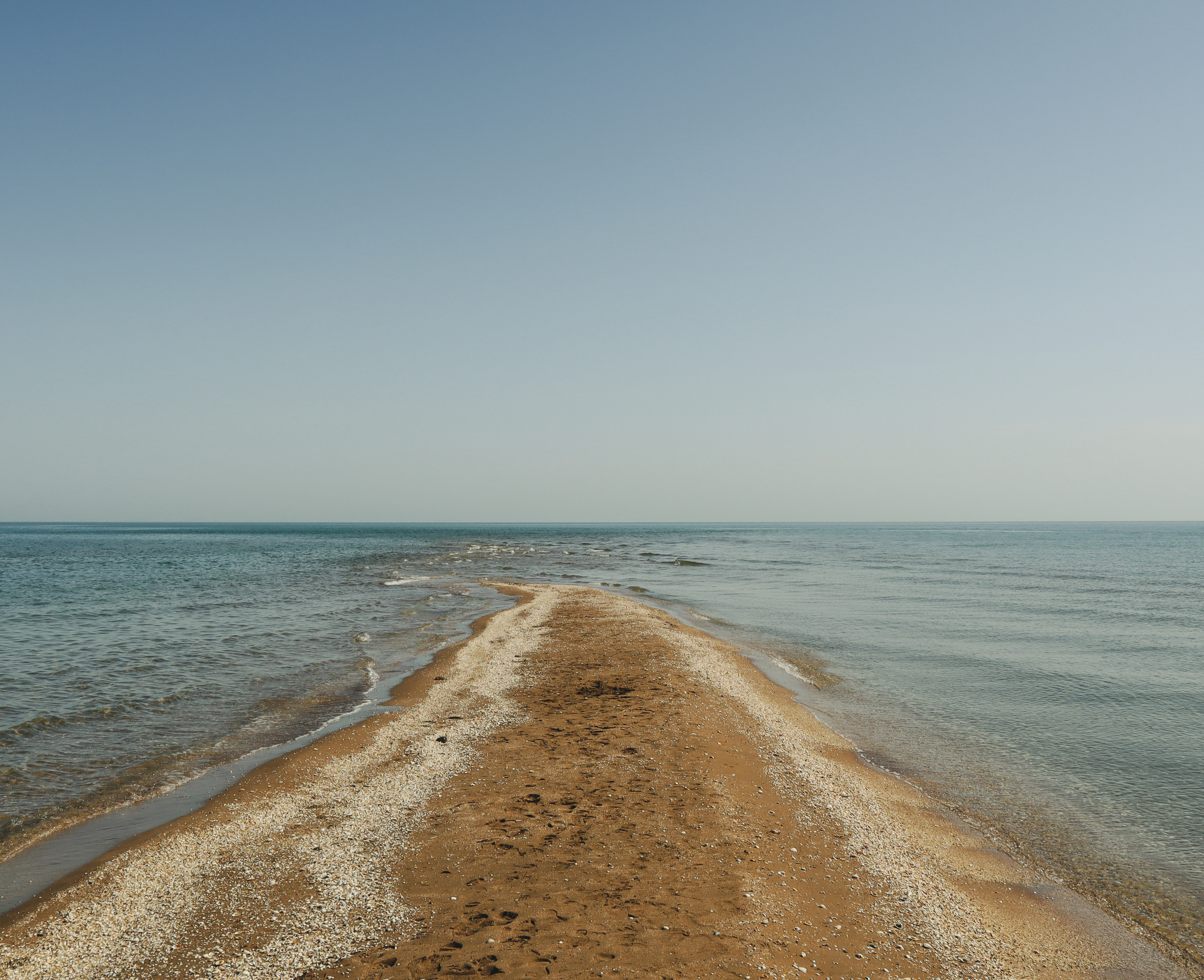

- Coordinates: 40°17′N 50°21′E
- Location: Azerbaijan

Shah Spit is a spit located in the far south-eastern part of the Absheron Peninsula. It is the largest spit in Azerbaijan. Shah Spit is the easternmost point of the Azerbaijan mainland. Administratively, Baku is located in the territory of Zira settlement.

== Geographical features ==
The spit extends throughout the Caspian sea, to the south. It has a narrow and long shape. The area is mostly sandy. It is not very high above sea level. For this reason, saline groundwater is close to the surface. Saline ponds and swamplands are widespread. The climate of the spit is characterized by strong winds.

== Absheron National Park ==
The spit is part of Absheron National Park. The park was established to protect the environment and its endangered rare species of flora and fauna, including caspian seals, gazelles, partridges, Caspian seagulls, and green-headed ducks.
