= Murmansk Shipping Company =

Russian shipping company

- Company type: Private
- Founded: 1939
- Defunct: October 6, 2020
- Headquarters: Murmansk, Russia
- Key people: Kulikov Nikolay Vladimirovich (chairman)
- Services: Shipping
- Website: www.msco.ru

Murmansk Shipping Company (Russian: Мурманское морское пароходство), often abbreviated as MSCO, was a Russian shipping company based in Murmansk. It was one of the primary shipping companies operating in Arctic Russia and northern Europe. In 2014 the company had 303 vessels, with a total dead weight of about 1.2 million tons. The company ran a notable museum in Murmansk.

== History ==
The company was established in September 1939, by order of the People's Commissar of the Navy of the USSR, as the Murmansk State Dry-Cargo and Passenger Shipping Company (Мурманского государственного морского сухогрузного и пассажирского пароходства), a state-owned enterprise. It was renamed in 1967. It specialised in arctic transportation, and by 1940 it had 37 vessels with a total deadweight of 112,200 tons.

During World War II its carriers served as allied escorts. It performed passenger as well as cargo navigation. In 1973, the Northern Fleet and the Murmansk Shipping Company commenced transporting spent nuclear fuel by barges to Murmansk, and then delivering it to Mayak by train.

In 1977, one of its ships, the nuclear-powered icebreaker Arktika, was the first ever to reach the North Pole.

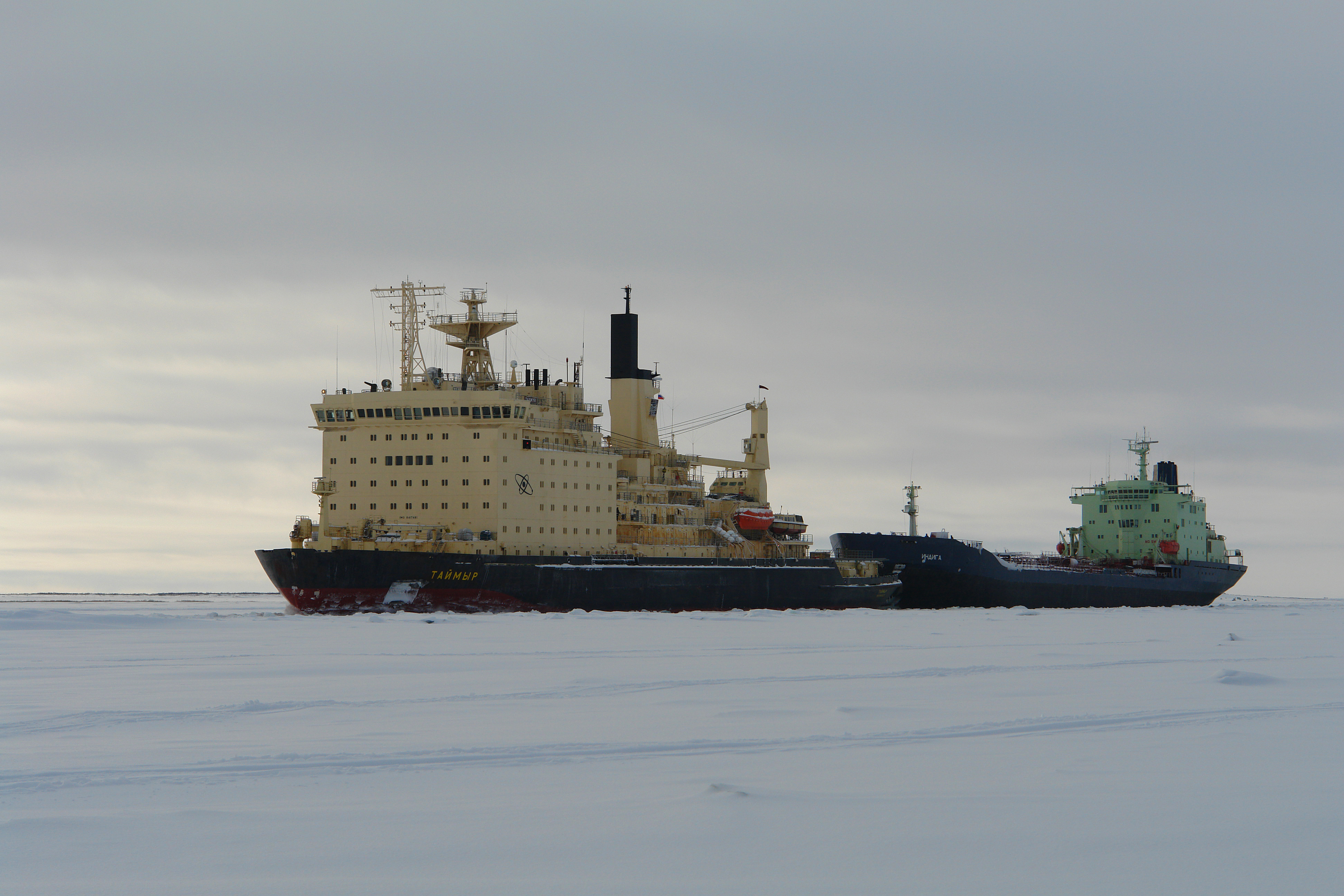
Nuclear-powered icebreaker Taymyr (left) and oil tanker Indiga (right)

The company was reorganized into the Joint Stock Company in 1993. At this time the company faced significant criticism from environmentalists which culminated from the Yablokov Report, drawn up by presidential adviser Aleksey Yablokov, which revealed that the Northern Fleet and the Murmansk Shipping Company had dumped some 2.5 million curies of liquid and solid radioactive waste in the Arctic Ocean between 1959 and 1991.

In 1996 the Murmansk Shipping Company reported 3,100 fuel assemblies were stored on the service ship Lotta.

In February 1998 the board was rumoured to consider discontinuance of its atomic fleet. At the time it operated eight civilian nuclear-powered vessels which were owned by the federal government.

In June 2017 the company made the first additions to its fleet in a decade.

In November 2018 the company signed a significant new contract to ship coal produced in the Russian arctic by VostokCoal along the Northern Sea Route to Europe. The coal was to be mined in the Taymyr Peninsula near to Norilsk and shipped via the northern-most port in Russia, the Port of Dikson, which is located on the Kara Sea.

In July 2019 the company lost the Kola Peninsula concession, which it had been servicing for 42 years with the Klavdiya Elanskaya.

In October 2020 the company declared bankruptcy.

== Facilities ==
The main operating facility of the company was at Atomflot, to the north of the city on the Murmansk Fjord. The base contained liquid and solid waste processing systems, warehouses for shipping supplies and workshops etc. The ships were maintained at the dry docks in Murmansk, and the Zvezdochka shipyard in Severodvinsk also made repairs to the reactors of the nuclear-powered icebreakers.

=== Museum ===
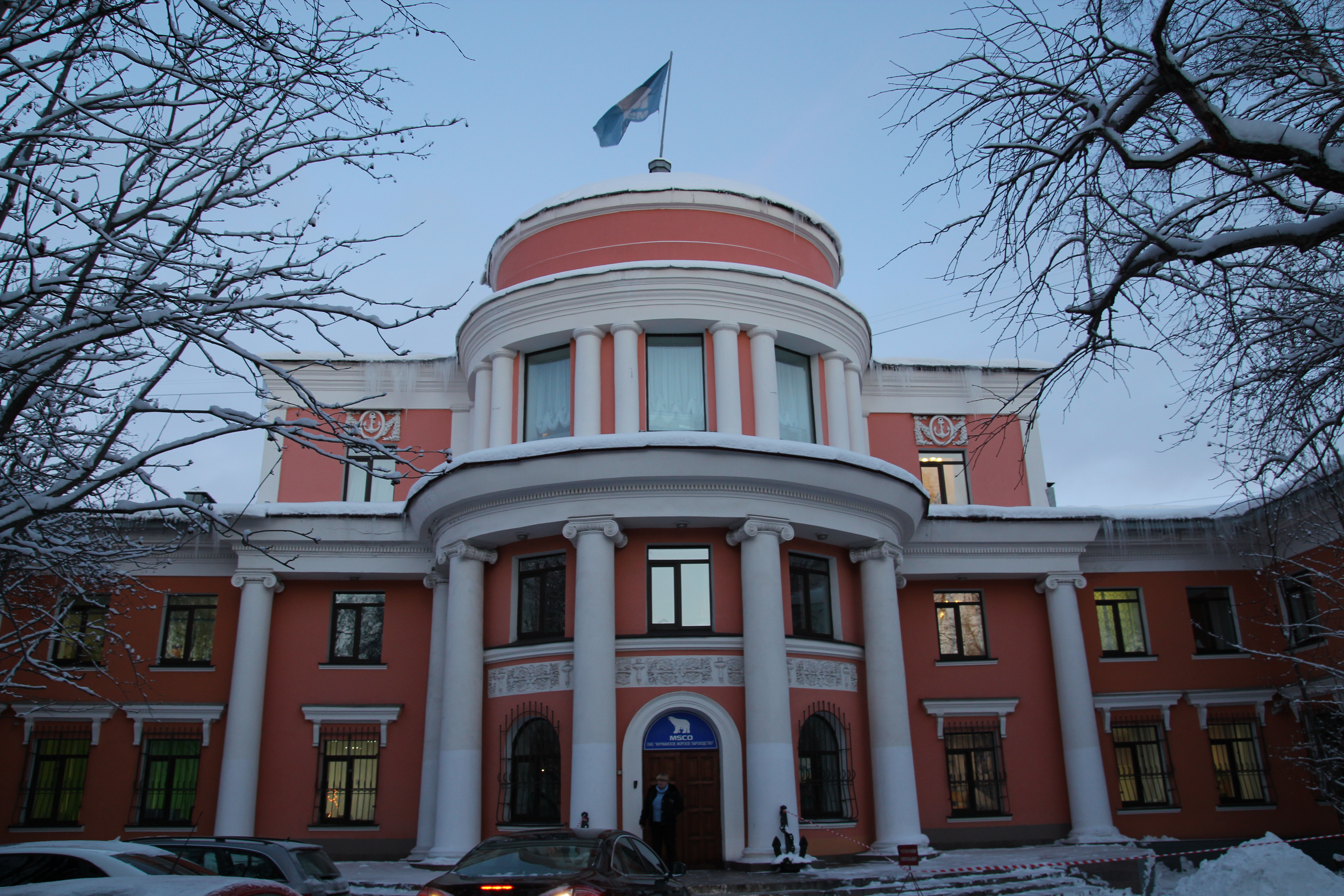
Murmansk Shipping Company Museum

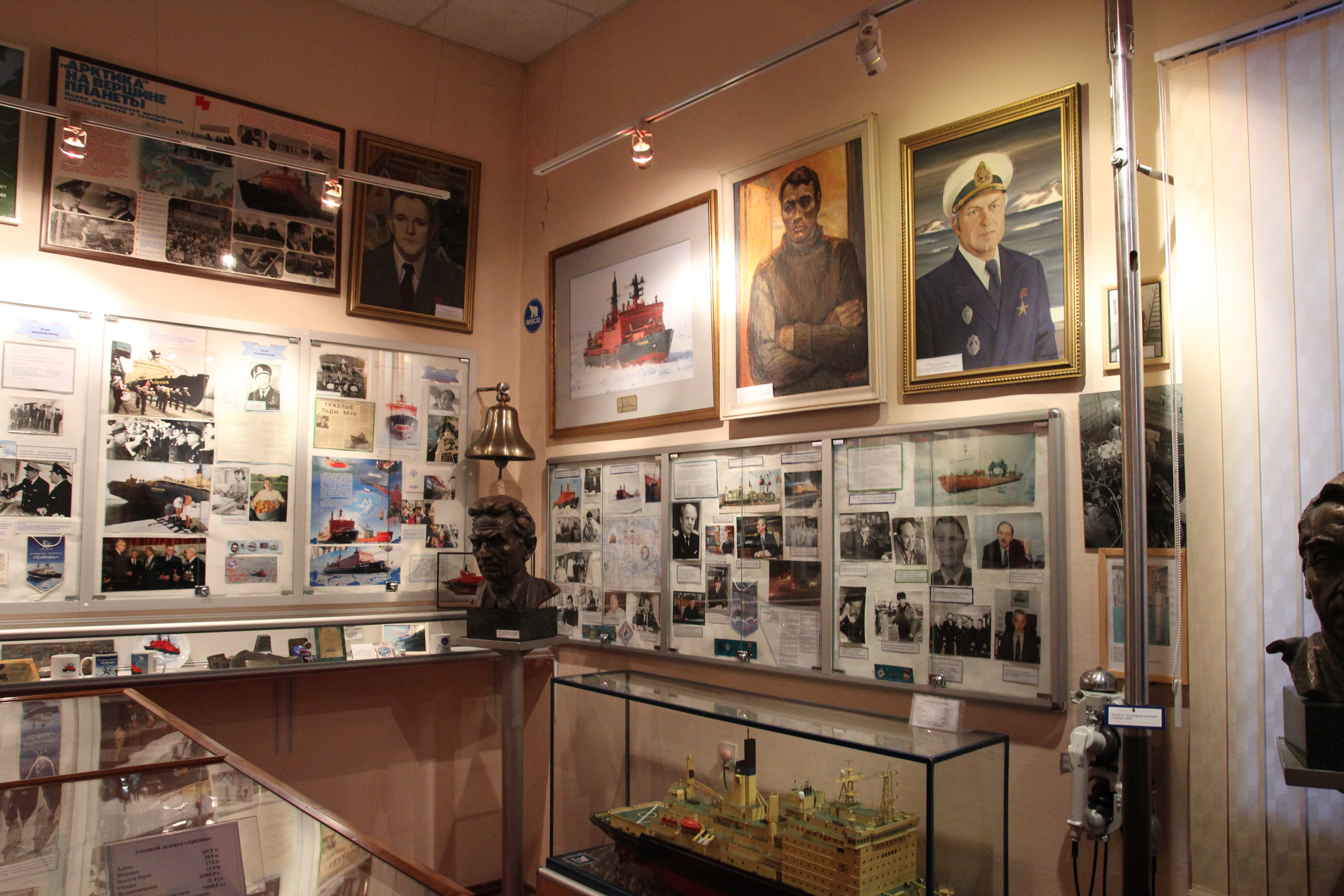
Murmansk Shipping Company Museum interior

The Murmansk Shipping Company Museum was on Volodarskogo Street in Murmansk, established in 1977, and had an extensive collection of artifacts related to its history and Russian naval history. Among its displays were photographs of polar captains, ship bells, micro model replicas, marine equipment, with one section dedicated entirely to icebreakers and their history. Icebreakers represented by particularly fine models include Yermak (1898), Fyodor Litke (1909), Sedov (1909), Alexander Sibiryakov (1909), Sadko (1913), Semyon Dezhnov (1939), Severny Veter (1944), Lenin (1959), Kiev (1965), Artika (1972), Krasin (1976), Kapitan Dranitsyn (1980), Vladmimir Ignatyuk (1983), Rossiya (1985) and Taymyr (1989).

== Past and present vessels ==
As of 2014 the company had 303 vessels, with a total deadweight of about 1.2 million tons. A selected number of ships are shown below:

- Indiga and Varzuga, Finnish icebreaking product tankers purchased in 2003
- A number of SA-15 type Arctic multipurpose cargo ships (Kapitan Danilkin and Yuriy Arshenevskiy)
- Sevmorput, the last nuclear-powered cargo ship previously operated by Murmansk Shipping Company
- Vladimir Ignatyuk, an icebreaker purchased from Canada
- Kotlas, a 1989-built tanker
- Kuzma Minin, a 1980-built bulk carrier
- Volodarsky, the oldest vessel of the fleet (launched in 1929) used to transport and store radioactive waste
