= MV Kuzma Minin =

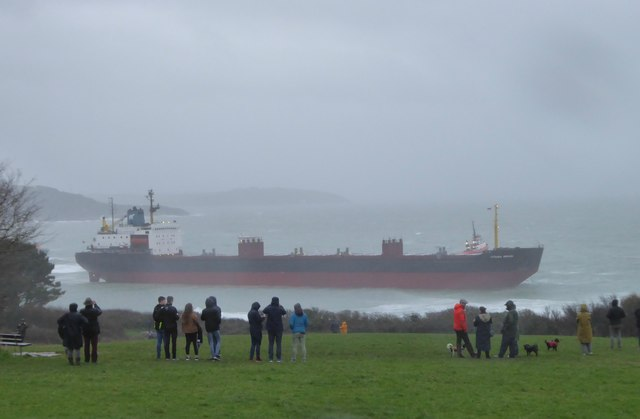

History
- Name: Kuzma Minin
- Namesake: Kuzma Minin
- Operator: Murmansk Shipping Company
- Port of registry: Murmansk, Russia
- Builder: Nordic Yards Warnemunde
- Completed: 1980
- Identification: IMO number: 7721263; MMSI number: 273133200; Callsign: UCJB
- Fate: Scrapped 3 June 2020

General characteristics
- Type: Bulk carrier
- Tonnage: 23,169 t DWT
- Length: 180.5 m (592 ft)
- Beam: 22.89 m (75.1 ft)
- Draught: 6.7 m (22 ft)
- Speed: 10.5 knots (19.4 km/h; 12.1 mph)

Kuzma Minin (Russian: Кузьма́ Ми́нин) was a bulk carrier, registered in Murmansk, Russia. The bulk carrier delivered cargo around northern Europe, and visits ports such as Arkhangelsk, Gdańsk, Riga and Port Talbot. The name is given to commemorate Kuzma Minin, a hero of Russian resistance during the Time of Troubles.

== Description ==
The single deck ship was built in 1980 by Nordic Yards Warnemunde of Rostock, Germany, and measures 180.5 metres (592 ft) by 22.89 metres (75.1 ft) with a deadweight tonnage of 23,169 tonnes. The ship was registered in Murmansk and was operated by the Murmansk Shipping Company.

== Grounding ==
On 18 December 2018 the ship ran aground off Gyllyngvase beach, Falmouth, Cornwall, but was re-floated the same day.

== Fate ==
The ship was scrapped at Aliaga on 3 June 2020.
