= MS Petrozavodsk =

Russian refrigerated cargo ship

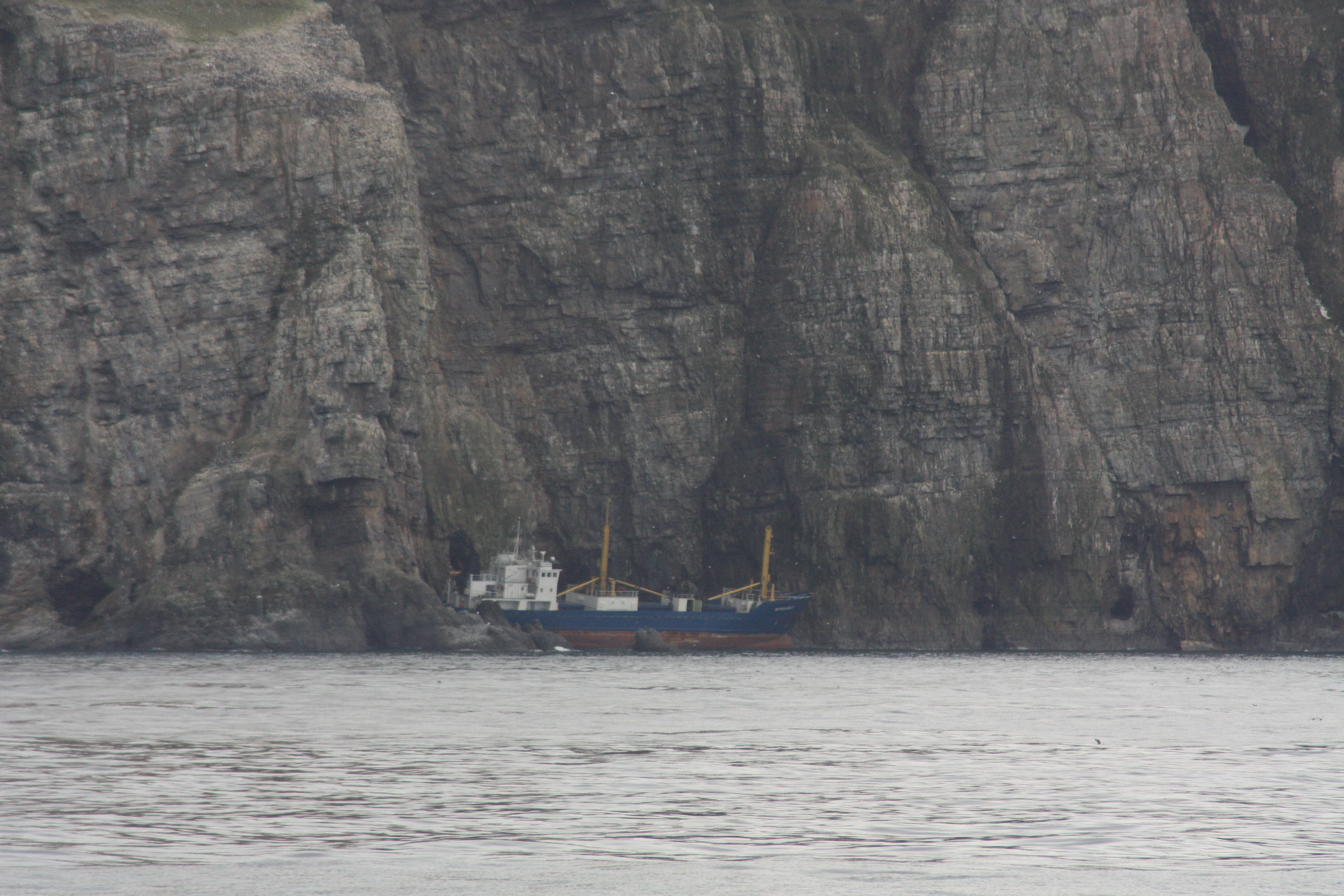
- Petrozavodsk aground in Bear Island in 2009

History

Russian
- Name: Nordlandia (1980); Zapolyarye (2003); Petrozavodsk (2004)
- Owner: RUS Murmansk
- Port of registry: Russia
- Builder: Skala Skipasmidja, Faroe Islands
- Yard number: 38
- Launched: 4 September 1978
- In service: 2 February 1980
- Identification: IMO number: 8016457; MMSI number: 273427300
- Fate: Wrecked off Bear Island on 11 May 2009

General characteristics
- Class & type: Reefer cargo ship
- Tonnage: 1,130 GT 1,372 DWT
- Length: 67 m (219 ft 10 in)
- Beam: 12 m (39 ft 4 in)
- Propulsion: Single screw
- Speed: 13.5 knots (25.0 km/h; 15.5 mph)
- Crew: 12

MS Petrozavodsk was a Russian reefer cargo ship that wrecked off Bear Island, Norway, on 11 May 2009.

== Description ==
Petrozavodsk was a refrigerated cargo ship with a gross tonnage of 1,130 GT and a summer deadweight of 1,372 DWT. It was 67 metres (220 ft) long and had a beam of 12 metres (39 ft). It was propelled by a single screw with a power of 1,342 KW and had a maximum speed of 13.5 knots. It had a crew of twelve.

== History ==
The ship was built by Skala Skipasmidja in Skali, Faroe Islands. It was launched on 4 September 1978 under the name Nordlandia and entered service with the company P/f Kenn based in Glyvrar on 2 February 1980. In 1993, the ship came under the ownership of TOO Giros, a Russian company, and the ship's port of registry was changed to Russia. In 2003, the ship was acquired by the Karelian Sg Company in Murmansk and its name was changed to Zapolyarye. The ship remained in service with this company for the remainder of its career, but changed its name one more time to Petrozavodsk in 2004.

=== Shipwreck ===
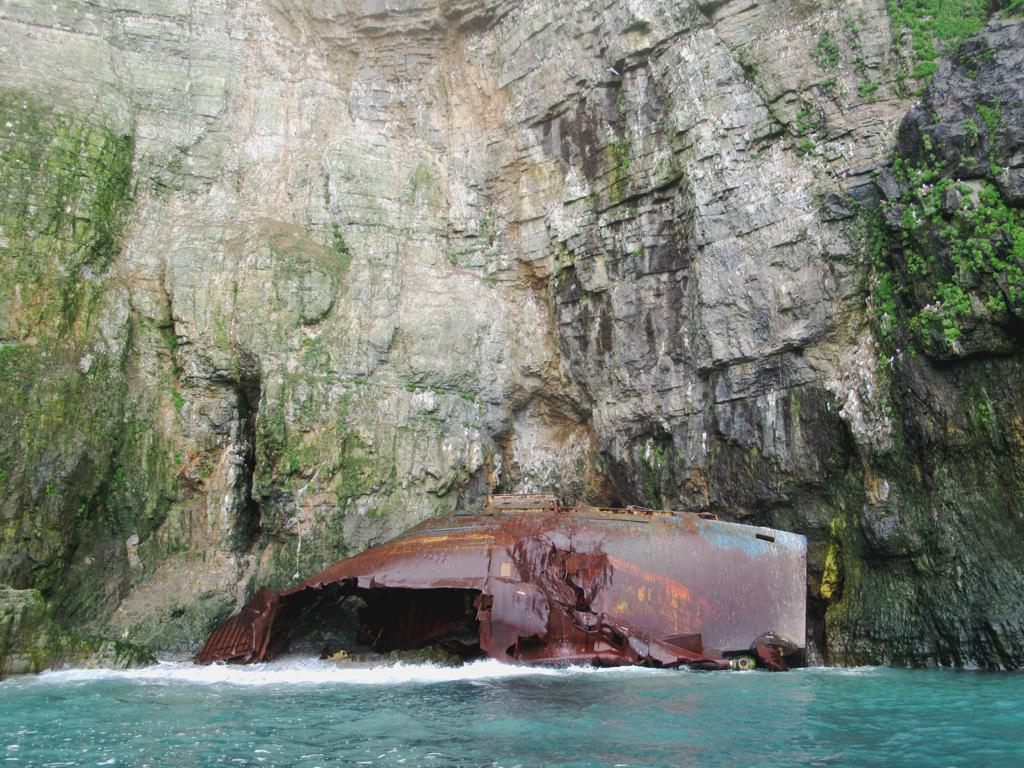
Wreck of Petrozavodsk in 2022

In May 2009, Petrozavodsk was acting as a freezer ship in the Barents Sea for a fleet of fishing vessels. On 11 May, the vessel ran aground on rocks on the southern tip of Bear Island, Norway. The vessel came to rest on a reef at the foot of high cliffs. The twelve crew aboard the vessel were rescued, but the ship itself was badly damaged by gashes in its port side caused by the rocks.

Petrozavodsk was unable to be removed from where it was stuck due to the frequency of rockfalls from the nearby cliffs, which would make any salvage operation dangerous. Compounding the problem, Bear Island is a bird sanctuary for several types of endangered Guillemots, and fuel leakage from Petrozavodsk posed a risk to newly hatched chicks in the summer. In total, the ship had fifty tons of diesel, 690 liters of lubrication oil, and several barrels of hydraulic oil on board when it ran aground. The diesel spilled over an area of three square kilometers, but did not cause much damage due to the oil evaporating. However, the remaining lubrication and hydraulic oil remained on board. The Norwegian Coastal Administration demanded that the ship's owner remove the oil, but no action was taken.

By 2011, the vessel was still in the same location and had not been removed, but it had split in two parts. It was reported that environmental contaminants such as lead and cadmium had polluted the surrounding area, and had been detected in sediment and marine organisms in the surrounding area. The Governor of Svalbard recommended that the vessel should be removed and salvaged to prevent further contamination to the area.
