= Torkan, Fars =

Torkan تركان
- Village
- Location within Iran
- Coordinates: 29°33′45″N 52°37′40″E
- Country: Iran
- Province: Fars
- County: Shiraz
- Bakhsh: Central
- Rural District: Kaftarak

Population (2006)
  - Total: 2,685
- Time zone: UTC+3:30 (IRST)
  - Summer (DST): UTC+4:30 (IRDT)

Torkan (Persian: تركان, also Romanized as Torkān; also known as Turkān) is a village in Kaftarak Rural District, in the Central District of Shiraz County, Fars province, Iran. At the 2006 census, its population was 2,685, in 726 families.
