= Omskiy type ship =

Class of dry cargo ships

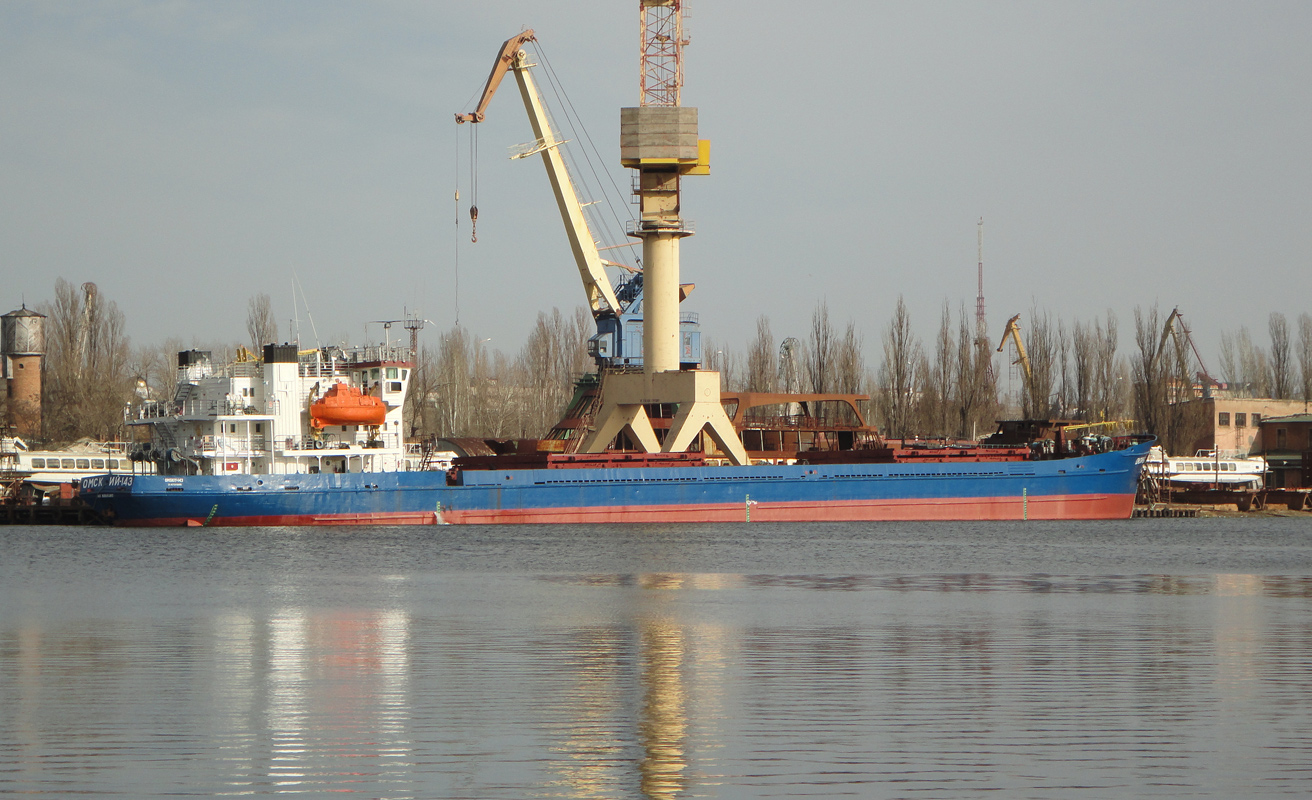
- Omskiy-143 at Khersonskiy Sudoremontnyy Zavod

Class overview
- Name: Omskiy type
- Operators: Russia
- Subclasses: Project 1743; Project 1743.1; Project 1743.7
- Built: 1972–1995
- Completed: ~140

General characteristics
- Type: Dry cargo ship
- Tonnage: Project 1743: 2,528 GRT; Project 1743.1: 2,447 GRT; Project 1743.7: 2,470 GRT
- Length: 108 m (354 ft 4 in)
- Beam: 15 m (49 ft 3 in)
- Draft: 1.0 m (3.3 ft)
- Decks: 1
- Propulsion: 2 × diesel engines
- Speed: 9 knots (17 km/h; 10 mph)
- Range: 10 days
- Crew: 11

The Project 1743 Omskiy type ships are a class of large dry cargo ships built from 1972 until 1995 in the Soviet Union, Russian Federation, and Romania.

== Description ==
Omskiy type ships are around 108 m (354 ft) long with a beam of 15 m (49 ft). They have a draft of 3.3 ft (1.0 m) and a displacement of roughly 2,500 GRT. They are big dry cargo ships with four covered holds, as well as a double bottom and sides. Omskiy type ships are powered by two diesel engines with 515 kW of power each.

There are three types of Omskiy type ships: Project 1743, Project 1743.1, and Project 1743.7. Project 1743 are the original cargo ships, while the 1743.1 and 1743.7 variants are modernized subclasses. The 1743.1 ships have a different interior of the superstructure as well as the placement of the two funnels and the form of the stern. The 1743.7 ships are longer and have two cranes for loading and unloading.

== History ==
Omskiy type ships were built in the Soviet Union and then Russia from 1972 until 1995, and in Romania from 1977 until 1991. The Project 1743.1 and 1743.7 were all built in the 1990s- with modernized equipment for river-sea operations. Around 140 ships were built in total, with 108 from Project 1743, 26 from Project 1743.1, and 7 from Project 1743.7.

Most of the ships were designed for use in the Lena and Ob-Irtysh river basins, and some were named after Siberian towns. A few ships were delivered to the Yenisey and Amur river basins, or to Europe. In the 1990s, most of the ships were transferred out of Russia to Europe or East Asia, and some were sold to foreign shipping lines to take on more convenient flags.

== List of ships ==
Ship name	Flag	Built	Owner	Image	Notes
Omskiy-4; IMO number: 8943105	Russia; St. Petersburg	1975 Krasnoyarsk Shipyard		Omskiy-4	
Omskiy-14; IMO number: 8874914	Russia; Taganrog	April 1980	Oceanic Bay Investments		
Omskiy-20; IMO number: 8943090	Russia; Bor	1974 Krasnoyarsk Shipyard			
Omskiy-105 (Captain Podoljan); IMO number: 8866747	Russia; Taganrog	October 1980 Șantierul Naval Oltenița	Mardim		
Omskiy-107; IMO number: 8866759	Russia; Taganrog	August 1981	River and Sea Shipping Agency		
Omskiy-109IMO number: 8875621	Russia; Nikolayevsk-na-Amure	January 1983	Amur Shipping Company		
Omskiy-121; IMO number: 8871194	Comoros; Moroni	1984 Șantierul Naval Oltenița			
Omskiy-132; IMO number: 8873025	Palau	1988			
Omskiy-133; IMO number: 8873336	Russia; St. Petersburg	31 July 1988 Șantierul Naval Oltenița	North Western Fleet Company		
Omskiy-135; IMO number: 8881723	Russia; St. Petersburg	1988 Șantierul Naval Oltenița			
Omskiy-143; IMO number: 8869385	Russia; Taganrog	1990	Bolshaya Sadovaya		
Omskiy-205 (Skif); IMO number: 8881814	Russia; St. Petersburg	1993 Krasnoyarsk Shipyard	Marship		Possibly damaged by a mine during the 2022 Russian invasion of Ukraine.
Omskiy-207; IMO number: 9132363	Russia; Astrakhan	1995			
