= Torkan, Afghanistan =

- Location in Afghanistan
- Coordinates: 35°36′17″N 68°54′54″E
- Country: Afghanistan
- Province: Baghlan Province
- Time zone: + 4.30

Torkan, Afghanistan is a village in Baghlan Province in north eastern Afghanistan.

== See also ==
- Baghlan Province
