= Baltic Leader =

Russian cargo ship

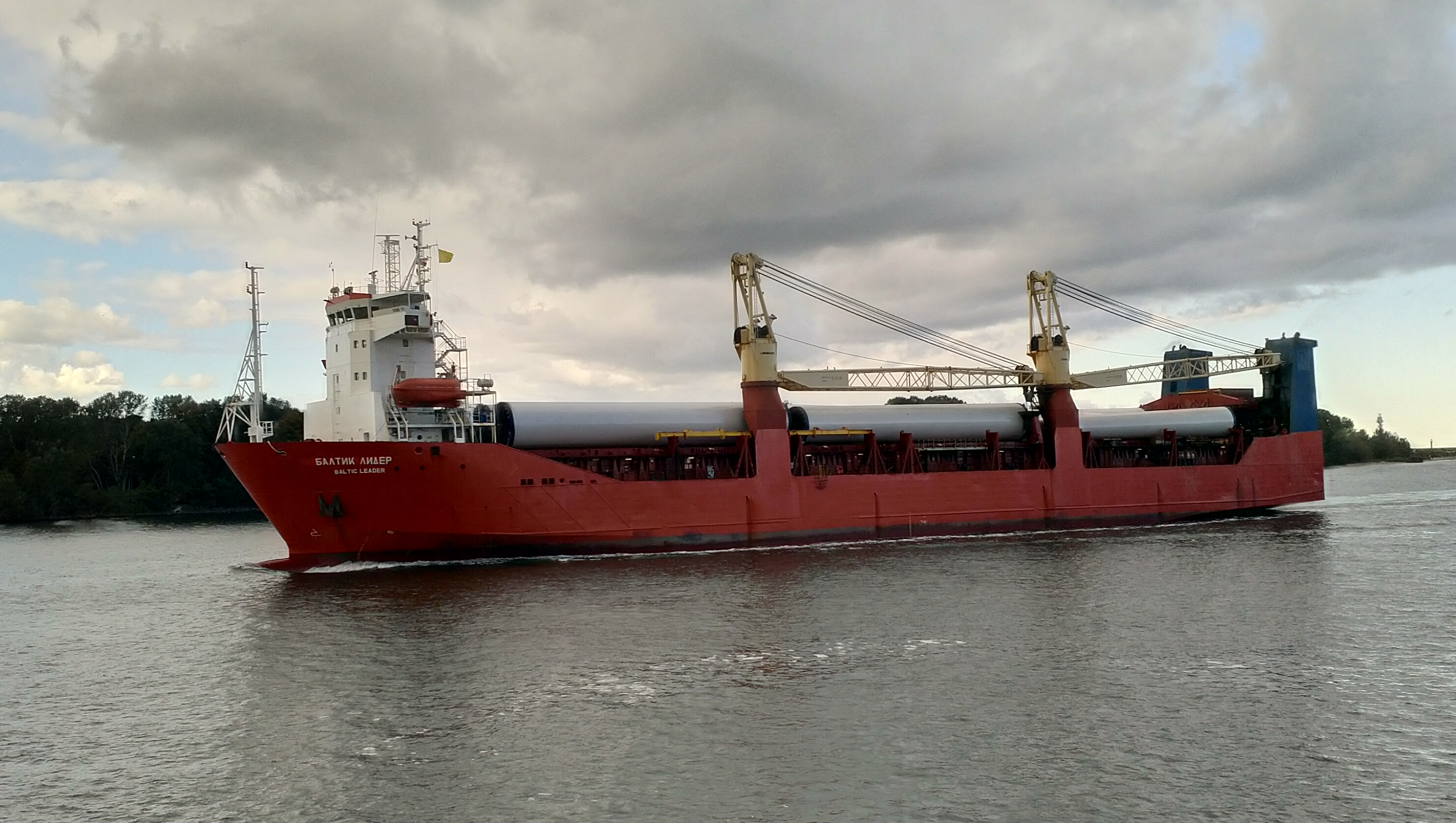
- Baltic Leader in the Port of Świnoujście, October 2021

History

Russia
- Name: BBC Kusan (2000–2013); RIO Kusan (2013–2018); Ocean Pride (2018–2021); Fleet Leader (2021); Baltic Leader (2021-present)
- Namesake: Baltic Sea
- Owner: MG Flot
- Port of registry: Russia
- Builder: Peene-Werft, Wolgast, Germany
- Yard number: 493
- Launched: 10 March 2000
- Identification: IMO number: 9220639; MMSI number: 273297850; Callsign: UBEW6

General characteristics
- Class & type: Ro-ro cargo ship
- Tonnage: 8,831 GT; 7,172 DWT
- Length: 127 m (416 ft 8 in)
- Beam: 20 m (65 ft 7 in)
- Draft: 4.9 m (16 ft 1 in)
- Speed: 10.5 kn

Baltic Leader is a Russian roll-on/roll-off cargo ship which was seized by French warships at the start of the 2022 Russian invasion of Ukraine.

== Description ==
Baltic Leader is 127 metres (416 ft 8 in) long, 20 metres (65 ft 7 in) wide, and has a draft of 4.9 metres (16 ft 1 in). It has a maximum speed of 10.5 knots.

== History ==
On 19 February 2022, Baltic Leader arrived in Rouen to load a cargo of automobiles. On 25 February, the ship departed for Saint Petersburg to deliver this cargo. That night, while transiting through the English Channel, the ship was intercepted and instructed to redirect to Pas-de-Calais by French maritime authorities. After being surrounded by three customs patrol boats, the Baltic Leader was boarded, inspected, and seized. It was escorted by one of the boats to port, where it arrived at around 2 a.m. the following morning. The ship's crew was allowed to go ashore while the vessel was detained.

== Legality ==
The legality and implications of the seizure of Baltic Leader have been debated since the action was taken. Shortly after Baltic Leader arrived in France, Russia officially recognized the breakaway states of Donetsk and Luhansk as independent, triggering an expansion of European Union sanctions against Russia. One new sanction was on the state-owned bank Promsvyazbank, which controls Baltic Leader, and was cited by French authorities as justification for the seizure of the ship. Additionally, United States Treasury Department sanctions had previously been levied against the ship because of its ties to Pyotr Fradkov, the son of former Russian prime minister Mikhail Fradkov.

The Russian embassy in Paris sent a message to the French foreign ministry formally protesting the seizure.

As of 2026, the ship is no longer being held.
