= Absheron Peninsula =

Peninsula in Azerbaijan

Coordinates: 40°27′50″N 49°57′30″E

Absheron Peninsula Abşeron yarımadası
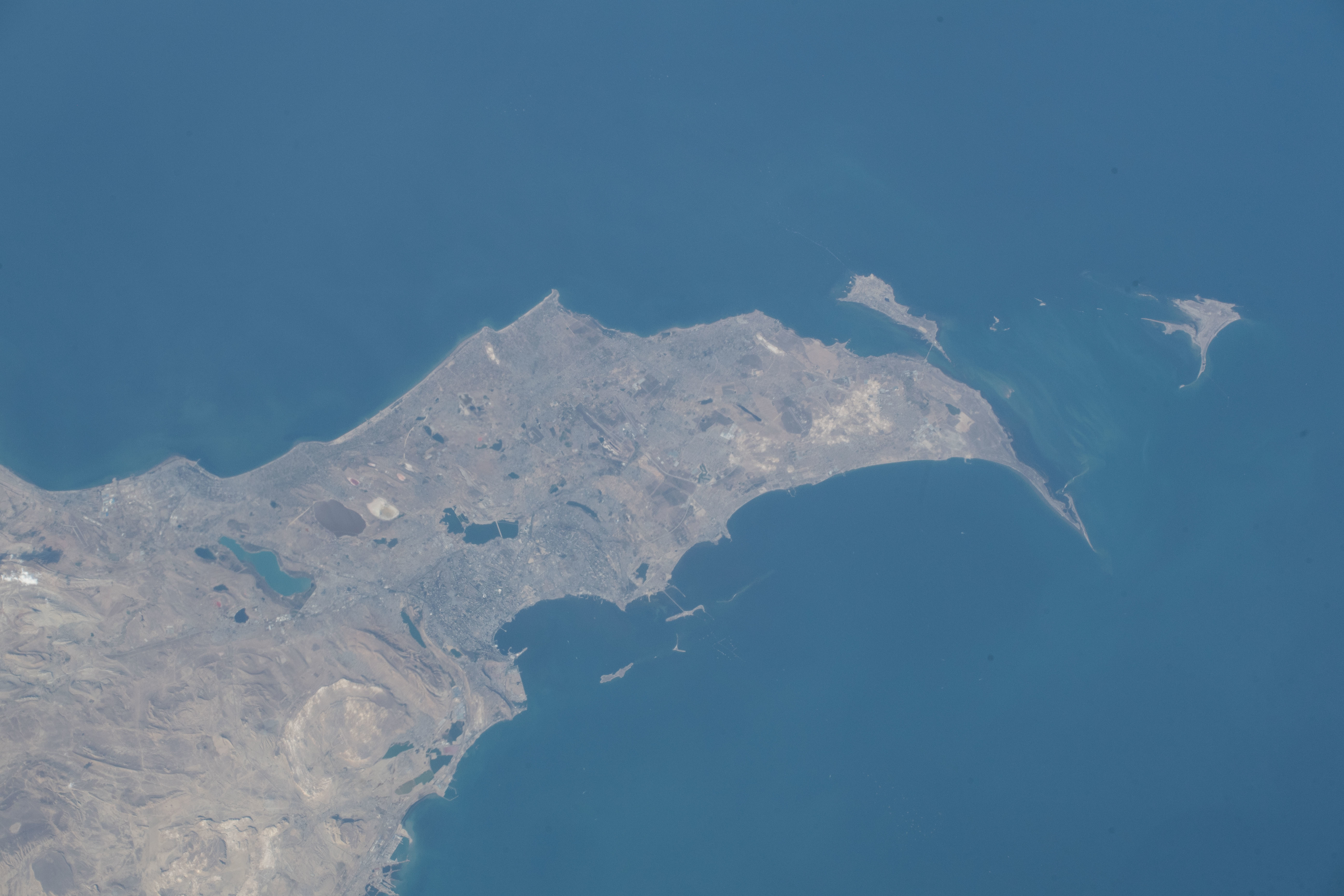
- Satellite image of the peninsula taken during the ISS Expedition 57
- Interactive map of Absheron Peninsula
- Country: Azerbaijan
- Seat: Baku City
- Subdivisions: List: Baku (city); Sumqayit (city); Absheron (rayon)

Area
  - Total: 2,110 km^{2} (810 sq mi)

Population (2022)
  - Total: 4.6 million
  - Rank: 1st
  - Density: 3,070/km^{2} (8,000/sq mi)
- ISO 3166 code: AZ-AB

The Absheron Peninsula (Azerbaijani: Abşeron yarımadası) is a peninsula in Azerbaijan. It is the location of Baku, the most populous city of the country, and the Baku Metropolitan Area, with its satellite cities Sumqayit and Khyrdalan. It extends 60 km (37 mi) eastward into the Caspian Sea, and reaches a maximum width of 30 km (19 mi). Azerbaijan's shape is often compared to an eagle, with the Absheron Peninsula forming its beak as it extends into the Caspian Sea.

Though technically the easternmost extension of the Caucasus Mountains, the landscape is only mildly hilly, a gently undulating plain that ends in a long spit of dunes known as Shah Dili, also known as the Shah Spit, which is the easternmost point of mainland Azerbaijan, now declared the Absheron National Park. In this part, the peninsula is dissected by ravines and characterized by frequent salt lakes. The peninsula also features four districts, of which two are urban (Baku and Sumqayit) while three are considered suburban (Absheron Rayon, Pirallahi Rayon, and the Khazar Rayon.)

== Etymology ==
The name "Absheron" comes from Persian آب‌شوران āb šurān (salty waters).

According to Conrad Malte-Brun in 1810, an alternative name for the peninsula was Okoressa.

== History ==
During the late 19th century, exploitation of the peninsula's petroleum resources caused large scale migrations of Iranian laborers to the Caucasus and Central Asia.

== Geography ==
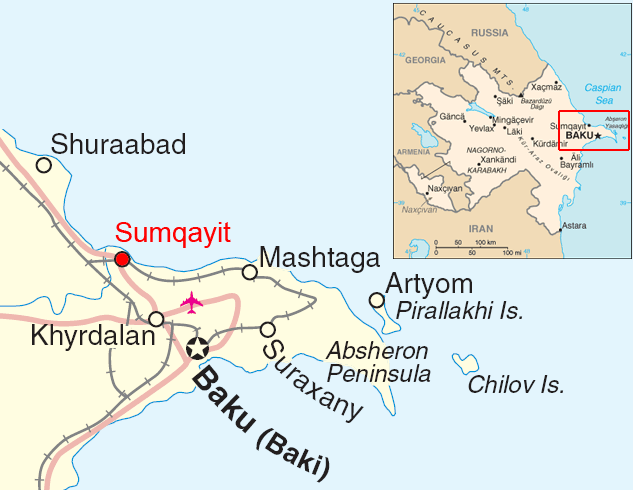
Absheron peninsula with its municipalities are shown

The Absheron peninsula is located in eastern Azerbaijan, along the western coast of the Caspian Sea with layers of deposits from the Cretaceous, Palaeogene, Neogene, Pliocene and Quaternary periods. The lithological composition up to the Neogene layers is made up of clays, sandy clays, sands and limestones. Middle Pliocene sediments are sandy clays. These are thick in areas with highly mineralized groundwaters. Fresh groundwater is unable to permeate the thick clays to reach underlying sequences, as the overlying layers of sediment deposits have a lower salinity. In the western areas of the peninsula, there are outcrops of low permeability clays from the Cretaceous, Paleogene, Neogene, and Lower Pliocene. These clays are deeper in the eastern areas and covered by Quaternary sediments. Although the peninsula is tectonically a southeast continuation of the Greater Caucasus, its Quaternary deposits are isolated.

== Climate ==
The Absheron Peninsula has a temperate semi-arid climate (Köppen climate classification: BSk) with warm and dry summers, cool and occasionally wet winters, and strong winds all year long. The peninsula is the most arid part of Azerbaijan (precipitation here is around or less than 200 mm (8 in) a year). The majority of the light annual precipitation occurs in seasons other than summer, but none of these seasons are particularly wet. The natural vegetation of the Absheron Peninsula is dry steppe and semi-desert. Due to the semi-arid climate, local agriculture requires irrigation.

== Environmental issues ==
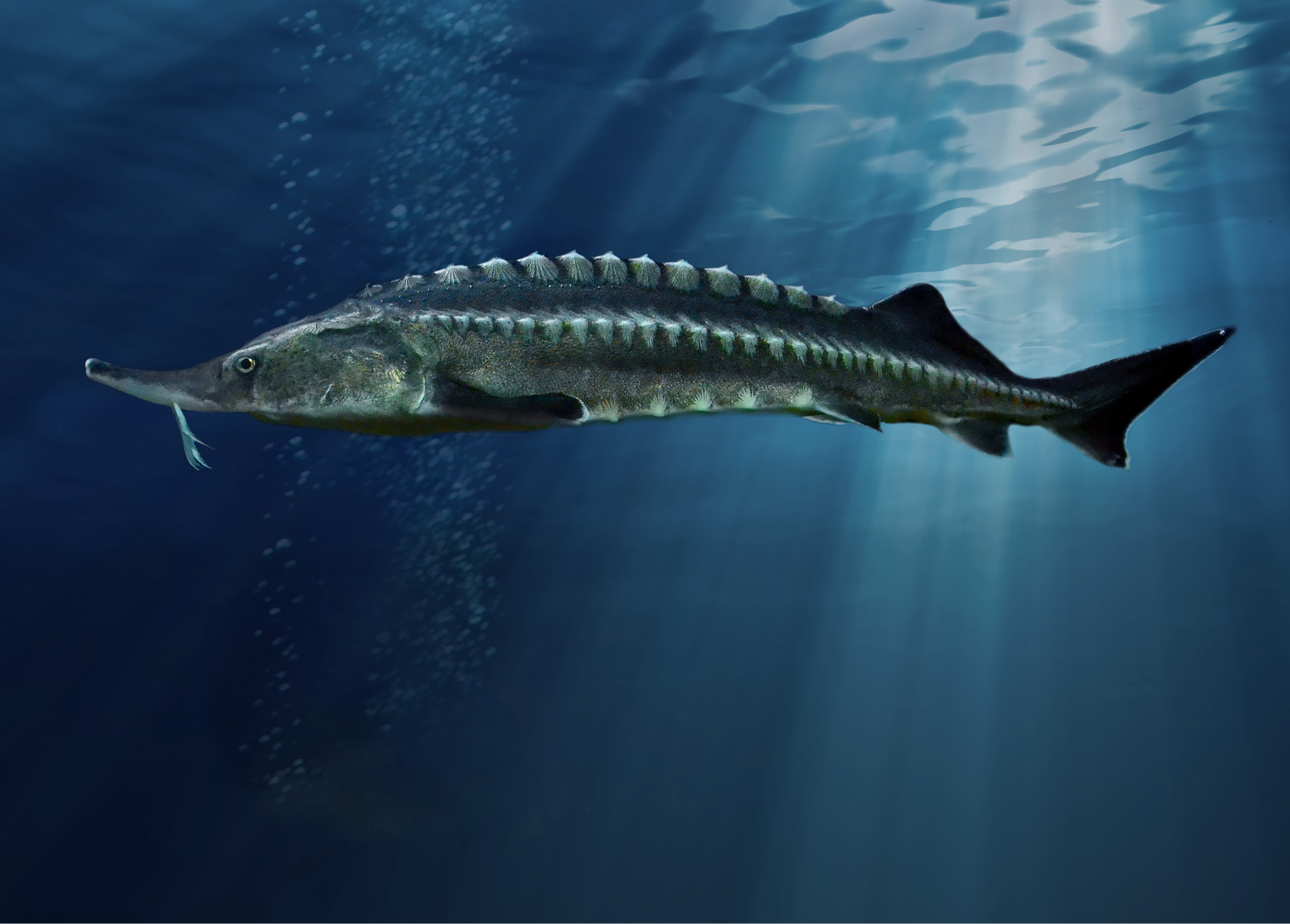
Beluga (sturgeon)

Petrochemical and refining industries on the peninsula have had environmental impacts on the Caspian Sea shore and the sea itself. Local scientists consider the peninsula (including Baku and Sumqayit and the Caspian Sea) to be the ecologically most devastated area in the world.

== Economy ==
Beginning in the 1870s, the Absheron Peninsula was the site of some of the world's earliest petroleum production. Much of the landscape remains scarred with rusting oil derricks.

== See also ==
- Absheron District (sharing a name, but not conterminous)
- Absheron's stone roads
- Baku
- List of peninsulas
