= Killing of Türkan Feyzullah =

Тюркян Фейзула
- Türkan Feyzullah
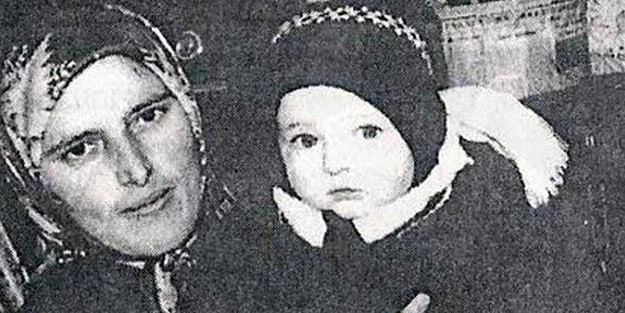
- Türkan with her mother
- Born: 24 April 1983; Mogilyane, People's Republic of Bulgaria
- Died: 26 December 1984 (aged 1); Mogilyane, People's Republic of Bulgaria
- Cause of death: Shooting
- Resting place: Mogilyane village, Kirkovo, Kardzhali Province

The killing of Türkan Feyzullah occurred on 26 December 1984, in Mogilyane in the People's Republic of Bulgaria. Türkan Feyzullah (Bulgarian: Тюркян Фейзула, romanized: Tyurkyan Feyzula) was a young Turkish child who died when Bulgarian security forces opened fire on a group of people protesting against the forceful assimilation policies of the time.

== Event ==
On 24 December 1984, protests started in Mlechino against the policies of the Bulgarian government and human right violations of Bulgarian Turks. This occurred in the context of the onset of the Revival Process assimilation campaign, which had begun that day. Türkan's mother attended the protests. The protests continued until 26 December when they were violently suppressed by the Bulgarian security forces.

Bulgarian soldiers started shooting at protesters, injuring dozens and killing 3, including Türkan Feyzullah. Türkan was struck by a bullet and died instantly in her mother's arms. Some sources give her age at that time of her death as seventeen or eighteen months, but the dates of birth and death on her headstone suggest she was twenty months old at the time. Her killer was never arrested.

== Legacy ==
Türkan became a symbol of Turkish resistance to Bulgarisation after her death. She is remembered at her grave every year with prayers on 26 December. Several monuments to Türkan exist in both Turkey and Bulgaria, including a monument in Bursa. A memorial fountain and a monument were built on the site of the shooting. Commemorative events are held there every year on the anniversary of her death.

Her brother Turhan Öztürk said in an interview about the persecution of the Turkish minority in Bulgaria: "They wanted to destroy our Turkish identity. The villagers didn't stay silent and marched in protest. Soldiers shot at defenseless people. My 18-month-old sibling was killed in my mother's arms. This left deep scars on my mom. All this showed you cannot make a people forget their roots. People must know what this monument stands for, the new generations must remember."

Türkan is commemorated every year with a poem written for her and carved on her memorial stone:

They called me Türkan

I had reached one and a half years old.

The cruel took my name

I got on my mother's back for the dirty road

you can't force this we said

Without checking left or right

they shot a bullet into my head

== See also ==
- List of unsolved murders
