= Gryfia (island) =

Neighbourhood of Szczecin, Poland

Coordinates: 53°26′46″N 14°35′26″E

Gryfia (island) (til 1945 German Greifen - Werft) – river island in Szczecin situated in area of Szczecin's Harbour "Gryfia" between West Oder river and Przekop Mieleński. On this area are located beautiful historic buildings of German and underwater boats shipyard.
