= Matros Pozynich =

Russian bulk carrier cargo ship

History

Russian
- Name: Shunwa (2010–2017); Tramontana (2017–2022); Matros Pozynich (2022– )
- Port of registry: Russia
- Launched: 28 June 2010
- Identification: IMO number: 9573816; MMSI number: 273292990; Callsign: UBBX5

General characteristics
- Class & type: Bulk carrier cargo ship
- Tonnage: 17,025 GT; 28,351 DWT
- Length: 169 m (554 ft 6 in)
- Beam: 27 m (88 ft 7 in)
- Draft: 7.6 m (24 ft 11 in)
- Speed: 16.9 kn

Matros Pozynich is a Russian cargo ship involved in smuggling grain during the 2022 Russian invasion of Ukraine.

== Description ==
Matros Pozynich is a dry goods bulk carrier with a gross tonnage of 17,025 GT and summer deadweight of 28,351 DWT. It is 169 metres (554 ft) long, 27 metres (89 ft) wide, has a draft of 7.6 metres (25 ft), and a maximum speed of 16.9 knots.

== History ==
The ship was built in Japan in 2010 by Shimanami Shipyard as Shunwa for the Panamanian company Wakoh Panama SA. Its homeport moved in 2017 to Majuro, Marshall Islands, and it was renamed Tramontana. On 1 February 2022 the ship was bought by Crane Marine Contractors in Astrakhan, Russia, and was given the name Matros Pozynich.

=== Grain smuggling ===
By May 2022, several months into the 2022 Russian invasion of Ukraine, Russia was in the process of stealing large amounts of grain products from occupied southern regions of Ukraine. As part of these efforts to export stolen grain, Matros Pozynich received a cargo of approximately 30,000 tons of grain from the port of Sevastopol after turning off its transponder on 27 April. The ship then transited the Bosporus strait and set out for Alexandria, Egypt, in order to sell the grain.

However, Egypt had already been alerted by Ukrainian officials that Russian ships were smuggling stolen grain, and Matros Pozynich was turned away. It then made for Beirut, Lebanon, but was turned away from there as well. Finally, it arrived in Latakia, Syria, where it remained for long enough to unload its cargo. From there, CNN reported that it was likely that the grain was transferred to another ship for export to disguise its origins.
