= Torkan, Kerman =

Torkan تركان
- Village
- Location within Iran
- Coordinates: 30°37′00″N 54°51′00″E
- Country: Iran
- Province: Kerman
- County: Shahr-e Babak
- Bakhsh: Dehaj
- Rural District: Dehaj

Population (2006)
  - Total: 50
- Time zone: UTC+3:30 (IRST)
  - Summer (DST): UTC+4:30 (IRDT)

Torkan (Persian: تركان, also Romanized as Torkān; also known as Tarkūn and Torkan Abad) is a village in Dehaj Rural District, Dehaj District, Shahr-e Babak County, Kerman Province, Iran. At the 2006 census, its population was 50, in 14 families.
