= MV Omskiy-205 =

Russian cargo ship

History

Russian
- Name: Skif (1993–1999); Carat (1999–2005); Berill (2005–2006); Omskiy-205 (2006– )
- Owner: Marship
- Port of registry: St. Petersburg, Russia
- Builder: Krasnoyarsk Shipyard
- Yard number: 255
- Launched: 1993
- Identification: IMO number: 8881814; MMSI number: 273315460; Call Sign: UFPE

General characteristics
- Class & type: Omskiy type general cargo ship
- Tonnage: 2,958 GT
- Length: 113 m (370 ft 9 in)
- Beam: 15 m (49 ft 3 in)
- Draft: 3.3 m (10 ft 10 in)
- Installed power: 1,030 kW (1,380 hp)
- Propulsion: Diesel
- Speed: 10.5 knots (19.4 km/h; 12.1 mph)
- Crew: 12

MV Omskiy-205 (Russian: ОМСКИЙ-205) is a Russian Omskiy type general cargo ship launched in 1993 by Krasnoyarsk Shipyard. It was damaged while underway during the 2022 Russian invasion of Ukraine, possibly by a Russian mine.

== Description ==
Omskiy-205 is a 2,958 GT general cargo ship which carries wood and logs. It is 113 m (370 ft 9 in) long with a beam of 15 m (49 ft 3 in) and a draft of 3.3 m (10 ft 10 in). The ship has a single deck and four dry cargo holds, each of which are roughly 1,100 m^{2} (12,000 sq ft) large. It has two German-built diesel engines, each with a 515 kW (691 hp) power output for a maximum speed of 10.5 knots (19.4 km/h; 12.1 mph). It has a crew of twelve sailors.

== History ==
Construction of the ship began in August 1985 under the yard number 255. It was completed in 1993 by Krasnoyarsk Shipyard and given the name Skif. The ship was renamed to Carat in 1999, Berill in 2005, and finally Omskiy-205 in 2006. Over the course of its career, the ship has been owned by the River and Sea Shipping Agency, as well as the Moscow-based companies Marship and VVT Shipping.

=== March 2022 incident ===
On 27 March 2022, Omskiy-205 was in transit from the port of Galluk in Istanbul to Rostov, Russia. Overnight, a distress call was issued while the ship was in the Black Sea, 2.5 miles (4.0 km) from Cape Takil near the Kerch Strait. The ship's captain reported that the hull had been breached, the engine room was flooded, and the ship hand lost power and was sinking.

Within an hour of the damage report, the Coast Guard border patrol ship Balaklava began rescue operations. A tugboat was sent out and Omskiy-205 was taken under tow around seven hours after the distress call. A rescue boat, the Rescuer Demidov, was also sent which operated three pumps in an attempt to control flooding aboard the ship. None of the 12 crewmen were injured, and Omskiy-205 was taken into port and eventually anchored near the Kerch Bridge off Kavkaz.

Following the incident, Russian media and Russian Maritime Authorities claimed that the hull breach was caused by strong waves and not by military action. However, because of the normal weather conditions and sea state at the time of the breach, it was suggested that Omskiy-205 had struck a friendly breakaway mine laid at the entrance to the Sea of Azov as a part of the 2022 Russian invasion of Ukraine.
