= Grigory Lovtsov =

Russian cargo ship

History

Russian
- Name: Kenyo Maru (2002–2010); Uglegorsk 1 (2010–2015); Grigory Lovtsov (2015– )
- Port of registry: Korsakov, Russia
- Builder: (Japan) Watanabe Zosen K. K.
- Yard number: 102
- Launched: 7 September 2002
- Identification: IMO number: 8974922; MMSI number: 273359010; Callsign: UBNG2
- Fate: Capsized off Sakhalin Island on 18 October 2024.

General characteristics
- Class & type: Roll-on/roll-off coastal cargo ship
- Tonnage: 194 DWT; 272 GT
- Length: 41.3 m (135 ft 6 in)
- Beam: 9.4 m (30 ft 10 in)
- Draft: 2.9 m (9 ft 6 in)
- Crew: 8

Grigory Lovtsov was a Russian roll-on/roll-off cargo ship which became stuck in the ice and lost in the Sea of Okhotsk in January 2022.

== Description ==
Grigory Lovtsov was a small coastal trading vessel with a shallow draft of 2.9 metres (9 ft 6 in), a length of 41.3 metres (135 ft 6 in), and a beam of 9.4 metres (30 ft 10 in). It had a summer deadweight of 194 DWT and a gross tonnage of 272 GT, and operated with a crew of eight. Made of steel, the vessel was propelled by a single diesel engine, shaft, and screw.

== History ==
Grigory Lovtsov was built in Japan in 2002 by Watanabe Zosen K. K., who gave it the yard number 102.

On 4 January 2022, the ship was transiting through the waters of the Shantar Islands in the Sea of Okhotsk when it became stuck in the ice and suffered a power outage. The ship's captain issued a distress signal and ordered the crew to abandon ship, and the Russian Ministry of Emergency Situations dispatched an Mi-8 helicopter to perform an evacuation of the crew. By 0800 the next day, all eight crew had been successfully evacuated and airlifted to safety in Nkolayevsk, Khabarovsk Krai, without any injuries. The vessel was left to drift with the ice flows. The ship was apparently recovered and was photographed in good condition in Vladivostok in November 2022.

On 18 October 2024, the ship capsized in the Sea of Okhotsk off Sakhalin Island, Russia. While loaded with sand and gravel, and reportedly overweight, the vessel rolled over and sank. Three crewmembers were rescued from the water by helicopter; four on board went missing.
