= Türkan =

- Municipality
- Location within Azerbaijan
- Coordinates: 40°21′50″N 50°12′54″E
- Country: Azerbaijan
- City: Baku
- Raion: Khazar

Area
  - Total: 40.22 km^{2} (15.53 sq mi)

Population (2020)
  - Total: 12,684
- Time zone: UTC+4 (AZT)
  - Summer (DST): UTC+5 (AZT)

Türkan (also, Turkyany, Tyurkend, Tyurkyan, and Tyurkyany) is a settlement and municipality in Baku, Azerbaijan. It has a population of 12,684. It means "Türk village" in Azerbaijani.

== See also ==
- Absheron's stone roads
