= Dübəndi =

Dübəndi Dübəndi
- Location in Azerbaijan
- Coordinates: 40°25′46″N 50°14′56″E
- Country: Azerbaijan
- City: Baku
- Time zone: UTC+4 (AZT)
  - Summer (DST): UTC+5 (AZT)

Dübəndi (Azerbaijani: Dübəndi; also, Dubendi and Dubendy, Tekqishlaq) is an Azerbaijan port and place of settlement on the Caspian Sea and oil depot, approximately 50 km northeast from Baku.

== Meaning of toponym ==
Past name was Tekqishlaq. This place got his first name from cognominal place Tekqishlaq. Then it get new name Dubendi. This name is from the "du" and "bend" components and means two barrier.

== Geography ==
Dubendi is sheltered from strong winds and waves by Pirallahi Island.

== Dubendi Oil Terminal ==
On the shore of the Caspian Sea are located the Dubendi oil terminal. The Dubendi Oil Terminal within the structure of SOCAR's Oil Pipelines Department accepts the oil produced in the oil fields and ships it to oil refining plants, as well as exports to the North. The Terminal also provides for transit transportation of oil and oil products. The Dubendi Oil Terminal's main directions of activity involve acceptance, storage and transportation of oil, overhaul of equipment and installations, rehabilitation works, provision for oil transportation accompanied with the strict implementation of technological process regime. The strengthening of production disciplinary rules amount the workers, fire safety and provision for implementation of safety technology rules, preparation of qualified workers, realization of proposals intended to increase efficiency at the workplace, and definition of labor resources are at the center of the Terminal's activity.

The storage capacity of Dubendi Terminal is 150,000 m³ for clean products (gasoline, diesel, naptha, jet fuel etc.) and 150,000 m³ for black products (crude oil and fuel oil). Clean product tank farm was totally refurbished and put in operation in August 2002 by Middle East Petrol.

In 2001 Dubandi transferred 3,2 million ton of oil from Kazakhstan and Turkmenistan.

== History ==
Kurgans and rock paintings of Dubandi were investigated for the first time In 1960s and 1970s by the archeologist by archeologist Qardashkhan Aslanov and Sherqiyye Sadigzadeh, archaeological excavations were carried out in the nearby territory and the remains of ancient mounds were discovered, which are a group of stone and stone-sand rows. Mounds included in the list of archaeological sites in Azerbaijan.
