= MV Zhibek Zholy =

Russian cargo ship

History

Russia
- Name: Zhibek Zholy
- Owner: (Kazakhstan) KTZ Express JSC
- Port of registry: Russia
- Builder: Nevskiy S&S, Shlisselburg
- Yard number: 408
- Launched: 16 September 2016
- Identification: IMO number: 9598880

General characteristics
- Class & type: Bulk carrier
- Tonnage: 5,686 GT; 7,000 DWT
- Length: 140 m (459 ft 4 in)
- Beam: 16.5 m (54 ft 2 in)

MV Zhibek Zholy is a Russian bulk carrier cargo ship involved in a grain smuggling dispute during the 2022 Russian invasion of Ukraine. It has a gross tonnage of 5,686 GT and a deadweight of 7,000 DWT. It is 140 metres (460 ft) long and has a beam of 16.5 metres (54 ft).

== History ==
Zhibek Zholy was built by Nevskiy S&S in Shlisselburg, Russia, and launched on 16 September 2016. It was owned by the Kazakhstani company KTZ Express JSC, who continued to operate the ship as of 2022.

In June 2022, Zhibek Zholy was transiting in the Black Sea when it turned off its AIS transponder and "went dark". By 1 July, the ship had been loaded with a cargo of 7,000 tons of grain from the Russian-occupied port of Berdiansk and was one its way to Turkish waters. The Ukrainian ambassador to Turkey formally requested that the vessel be detained by Turkish authorities based on an accusation that it was transporting grain which was stolen from Ukraine.

On 4 July, Turkey halted Zhibek Zholy off the port of Karasu in order to investigate these claims, and the vessel remained anchored roughly a kilometer offshore on 6 July. On 6 July, Russia's Foreign Ministry issued several statements on the status of the ship. Foreign Ministry spokesman Alexei Zaitsev denied reports that Zhibek Zholy had been detained, claiming that "standard procedures" were being followed. Foreign Minister Sergey Lavrov also downplayed Russian involvement in the ship, stating that while it was Russia-flagged the grain deal had been organized by the Kazakhstani owners of the ship and an Estonian firm. The Kazakhstani company KTZ Express JSC stated that they leased the vessel out to a Russian company, Green Line LLC, which is not officially under sanctions. Additionally, the Minister of Industry and Infrastructure Development of Kazakhstan said that it was considering terminating the lease in light of the new accusations of grain theft, but would allow Turkey to continue its investigations.

By 7 July, the ship left Karasu for Russian territorial waters, and according to France 24 sources, it was waiting at Port Kavkaz in order to offload the grain to another vessel.
