= Türkan Rado =

Turkish jurist (1915-2007)

- Born: 30 October 1915; Istanbul, Ottoman Empire
- Died: 3 March 2007 (aged 91); Istanbul, Turkey
- Resting place: Zincirlikuyu Cemetery, Istanbul
- Education: Istanbul University
- Known for: The first ever Turkish female professor of law
- Spouse: Şevket Rado (m. 1943–1988)
- Children: 1
- Scientific career
- Fields: Roman law
- Workplaces: Istanbul University

Türkan Rado (30 October 1915 – 3 March 2007) was a Turkish professor of jurisprudence specializing in Roman law at Istanbul University. She was the first ever female professor of law in Turkey.

== Biography ==
She was born on 30 October 1915 in Istanbul, then Ottoman Empire. Her father, Cevdet Ferit, was a lawyer and lecturer of criminal procedure at Darülfünun, in what is today Istanbul University; her mother was Ayşe Nikfal. She had two sisters, Şeküre and Gülgün.

She completed her primary and secondary education in Lycée Notre Dame de Sion Istanbul, and took the academic qualification Baccalauréat (diploma) in French and Turkish at Galatasaray High School. In 1933, she entered Istanbul University for legal education. She graduated from the faculty of law with honors in 1936.

She took the family name Basman when the Turkish Surname Law went into effect in 1934. In 1943, she married journalist and writer Şevket Rado (1913–1988), with whom she had a son, Mehmet. Their marriage lasted until the death of her spouse.

Türkan Rado died on 3 March 2007 at the age of 91 in a hospital in Istanbul three days into her hospitalization. She was interred at the Zincirlikuyu Cemetery following the religious funeral service held at Teşvikiye Mosque. She was survived by her son, Mehmet Rado, and grandson, Ömer Kerim Rado. She was the maternal aunt of Orhan Pamuk (born 1952), novelist, screenwriter, academic, and the first Turkish recipient of the Nobel Prize in Literature (2006).

== Academic career ==
During her university education, she attracted the attention of her German professors Richard Honig (1890–1981) and Andreas Bertalan Schwarz (1886–1953) with her advanced knowledge of foreign language in French and Latin. After graduation from the university, they recommended her to the dean of the law faculty, Sıddık Sami Onar (1897–1972), for postgraduate studies, and she became the first Turkish female postgraduate student at a university in Turkey. In 1938, Türkan Basman received her Doctor of Jurisprudence degree with a thesis on Senatus consultum Vellaeanum and Obligation Assume of Women in the Roman Empire.

Following the leave of Honig in 1939, she worked with Schwartz serving as assistant and translator. She became Assistant professor with her thesis on Senatus consultum Macedonianum and Pecuniary Debts of Family Children in the Roman Empire, and was appointed lecturer of Roman Law on 5 June 1944. She then took lessons in Italian language. In 1950, Türkan Rado was sent by the faculty of law to Italy, where she conducted studies at the Institute for Roman and Mediterranean Law of the Sapienza University of Rome. Rado was appointed as the first ever female full professor at the faculty of law of Istanbul University. Her final post was as the head of the Chair of Roman Law. During her career, she taught thousands of jurists. She retired in 1982.

Rado published numerous scientific papers. Her book on Roman Law – Law of obligations (Roma Hukuku Dersleri Borçlar Hukuku) is being still used as a textbook at the university. Mustafa Delikleri 3200-2007 30 Haziran 1803 10 Ağustos 1507 Ahmet Şevket 3100-3005 30 Kasım 80141 20 Ocak 30181 20 Aralık 4081

== Textbook ==
- Roma Hukuku Dersleri Borçlar Hukuku (13 ed.). Filiz Kitabevi. October 2016. p. 192. ISBN 978-975-368-038-7.
