= Türkan Haliloğlu =

Turkish biochemist

- Education: Boğaziçi University (BS, MS, PhD)
- Scientific career
- Fields: Biochemistry
- Workplaces: Boğaziçi University

Türkan Haliloğlu is a Turkish biochemist researching biopolymers, computational structural biology, protein dynamics, binding and folding of proteins, and protein interactions. She is a professor in the department of chemical engineering and director of the polymer research center at the Boğaziçi University.

== Education ==
Haliloğlu earned a BS (1987), MS (1989), and PhD (1992) in chemical engineering Boğaziçi University. From 1992 to 1993, she was a postdoctoral researcher at the University of Akron Institute of Polymer Science.

== Career and research ==
Haliloğlu is a professor in the department of chemical engineering and director of the polymer research center at the Boğaziçi University. She researches biopolymers, computational structural biology, protein dynamics, binding and folding of proteins, and protein interactions.

== Awards and honors ==
In 2012, Haliloğlu became a member of the Turkish Academy of Sciences. In 2018, the NATO Deputy Secretary General, Rose Gottemoeller, presented Haliloğlu with the partnership prize from the NATO Science for Peace and Security for her molecular research on bacteria used in biological weapons.
