= List of shipwrecks in 2022 =

The list of shipwrecks in 2022 includes ships sunk, foundered, grounded, or otherwise lost during 2022.

table of contents
2022
Jan	Feb	Mar	Apr
May	Jun	Jul	Aug
Sep	Oct	Nov	Dec
Unknown date

== January ==
=== 1 January ===
List of shipwrecks: 1 January 2022
Ship	State	Description
Baragoola	Australia	Baragoola The then 99-year-old ferry quickly sank at her moorings after a decade of being poorly maintained. Two people were aboard, and left the vessel soon after it started taking on water. The vessel was scheduled to be broken up in place, as refloating was considered impossible.

=== 3 January ===
List of shipwrecks: 3 January 2022
Ship	State	Description
Unnamed migrant boat	Unknown	An inflatable boat sank off the coast of Lanzarote, Canary Islands. 51 men were rescued.
Unnamed migrant boats	Unknown flag	Two migrant boats capsized off the coast of Almeria, Spain, at night. 16 people were rescued, three bodies were recovered, and 10 remain missing.
Unidentified trawler	Bangladesh	A trawler, with 14 aboard, developed a hole in its hull and capsized on the Meghna River. Four people, a grandmother and three of her grandchildren drowned, while the other 10 were injured, and taken to a local hospital for treatment.

=== 4 January ===
List of shipwrecks: 4 January 2022
Ship	State	Description
Grigory Lovtsov	Russia	The coaster became trapped in ice in the Sea of Okhotsk off the Shantar Archipelago. Her eight crew were rescued by a helicopter.
Unnamed migrant boat	Unknown flag	A migrant boat capsized in the Atlantic Ocean on a voyage from North Africa to an unknown destination. 32 people were rescued, one body was recovered, and 11 remain missing.

=== 5 January ===
List of shipwrecks: 5 January 2022
Ship	State	Description
Tanimbar Bahari	Indonesia	The coaster developed a list and sank in a storm in 30 metres (98 ft) of water off Saumlaki Harbour, in the Tanimbar Islands, in the Timor Sea. Her crew of 15 swam to shore and were safe.
Unidentified fishing vessel	China	A fishing vessel collided with Ocean Loong (Panama) and sank in the East China Sea 85 nautical miles (157 km) east south east of Wenzhou. Her five crew were reported missing.
Unidentified trawler	Bangladesh	A trawler, with 70 people aboard, collided with the passenger launch Farhan 6 on the Meghna River and sank, with 10 people missing. Nine bodies were recovered. Four crew of Farhan 6 were detained by authorities, while the ship itself was detained.

=== 6 January ===
List of shipwrecks: 6 January 2022
Ship	State	Description
Unidentified fishing vessel	South Korea	A fishing vessel was sunk in a collision with Shun Shin (Mongolia) and sank in the East China Sea 55 nautical miles (102 km) south of Jeju Island, South Korea. Her eight crew were rescued.

=== 8 January ===
List of shipwrecks: 8 January 2022
Ship	State	Description
Jin Shui Yuan 2	Unknown flag	The derelict cargo ship sank in the Gulf of Siam 30 nautical miles (56 km; 35 mi) off Nakhon Si Thammarat Province south of Koh Samui, Thailand in 30 metres (98 ft) of water whilst under tow by a Royal Thai Navy vessel.

=== 9 January ===
List of shipwrecks: 9 January 2022
Ship	State	Description
New Hummer	Indonesia	The cargo ship was driven ashore at Sunda Kelapa.

=== 10 January ===
List of shipwrecks: 10 January 2022
Ship	State	Description
ROCS Da Tai	Republic of China Navy	The Abnaki-class tugboat was noticed to be on fire at around 4 PM. The Keelung City Fire Department and military personnel extinguished the fire soon after.

=== 11 January ===
List of shipwrecks: 11 January 2022
Ship	State	Description
Chirat	Thailand	The luxury catamaran yacht burned out at Sattahip Ocean Marina Yacht Club, Pattaya, Thailand.
Fridtjof Nansen	Norway	The cruise ship ran aground while on a voyage from Lofoten to Flåm. None of her 233 passengers and 165 crew were injured, but they were taken off the ship and transported to Ålesund.
Unnamed yacht		A finished, but not yet delivered to owner, luxury 30-metre (98 ft) yacht burned out, or was heavily damaged, at Ferretti shipyard, Cattolica, Italy. Video

=== 12 January ===
List of shipwrecks: 12 January 2022
Ship	State	Description
SMP Novodvinsk	Russia	The cargo ship ran aground in the fairway in Szczecin Bay while approaching port of Szczecin, Poland. It was refloated on 11 February.

=== 15 January ===
List of shipwrecks: 15 January 2022
Ship	State	Description
Nordic	Tonga	The fishing vessel was driven ashore at the Nuku’alofa wharf after multiple tsunamis barreled into Tongatapu, Tonga's coastline within minutes of the Hunga Tonga–Hunga Ha'apai volcano's explosion.

=== 17 January ===
List of shipwrecks: 17 January 2022
Ship	State	Description
Mumbles	United States	The 60-foot (18 m) mussel-farming barge sank while moored during a storm. It currently lies 50-foot (15 m) below the waterline. A salvage attempt had to be cancelled due to poor weather conditions, but new salvage operations were being planned, and the vessel was scheduled to return to service by June.

=== 18 January ===
List of shipwrecks: 18 January 2022
Ship	State	Description
High Prosperity	Liberia	The diesel tanker grounded near Port Qasim at 7:30 AM after its engine failed while berthing. Its shipment was contained.

=== 19 January ===
List of shipwrecks: 19 January 2022
Ship	State	Description
Chaader Alo	Bangladesh	The trawler capsized after colliding with the passenger-launch Mitali-8 (Bangladesh) on the Meghna River. One of the four people aboard, along with the vessel's cargo of wood, was lost, while the remaining three were able to swim to shore.

=== 22 January ===
List of shipwrecks: 22 January 2022
Ship	State	Description
Por Andaman 2	Thailand	The product tanker sank in the Gulf of Siam 62 nautical miles (115 km) north of Koh Samui Island, Thailand. Her six crew were rescued.

=== 25 January ===
List of shipwrecks: 25 January 2022
Ship	State	Description
Manassa Rose	Comoros	The cargo ship ran aground on the northwest Crete coast in Kissamos Bay in a storm, reportedly broke in half. Her ten crew were rescued.
Unnamed migrant boat	Unknown flag	A 25-foot (7.6 m) motor boat capsized in rough weather roughly 40 miles (64 km) east of Florida's Fort Pierce Inlet while smuggling 40 migrants from Bimini, Bahamas to the United States. Of the people aboard, one person, Juan Esteban Montoya Caicedo, survived. Five bodies were recovered, and the search for the rest of the passengers was called off on 27 January.
Vivens Aqua	United States	The 55-foot (17 m) yacht ran aground on South-Head Beach, Ocracoke, North Carolina, United States at 1:00 AM after its steering system failed. Two people were aboard at the time; one person was evacuated, while the other stayed on the boat. Although the yacht was quickly moved further up the beach by salvage crews, proper salvage work started on 5 February, and completed on 9 February at 12:30 PM. The vessel was then towed to a shipyard on 10 February.

=== 27 January ===
List of shipwrecks: 27 January 2022
Ship	State	Description
Campbell Cove	Australia	The tugboat was rammed by the cement carrier Goliath (Australia) in Devonport, Tasmania at 11:50 AM while docked in Berth 4 West. It was submerged on the bottom, but still secured to its dock, and the Tasmanian Environmental Protection Authority had started a cleanup effort to deal with large amounts of leaking fuel. No people were aboard the tugs at the time of collision. The damage was considered irreparable, and on 1 February, United Salvage of New South Wales started salvage work.
Thorswind	Liberia	The container ship ran aground while on a voyage from Sharjah to Abu Dhabi. It was refloated on 29 January.
Unnamed migrant boat	Unknown flag	A migrant boat sank off the coast of Zarzis, Tunisia after departing from Libya on a voyage to Italy. Of the estimated 70 people aboard, six died, 34 were rescued, and another 30 were reported missing.
York Cove	Australia	The tugboat was rammed by the cement carrier Goliath (Australia) in Devonport, Tasmania at 11:50 AM while docked in Berth 4 West. It was submerged on the bottom, but still secured to its dock, and the Tasmanian Environmental Protection Authority had started a cleanup effort to deal with large amounts of leaking fuel. No people were aboard the tugs at the time of collision. The damage was considered irreparable, and on 1 February, United Salvage of New South Wales started salvage work.

=== 28 January ===
List of shipwrecks: 28 January
Ship	State	Description
Unidentified catamaran	Australia	A catamaran capsized in Jervis Bay, New South Wales, Australia. Of the two aboard, one man was rescued, and a body, believed to be of the second man, was recovered.

=== 30 January ===
List of shipwrecks: 30 January 2022
Ship	State	Description
Unidentified catamaran	United States	A catamaran capsized during a race off of Key West, United States. Two people were rescued.
Unidentified panga	Unknown flag	A motorized panga ran aground near the Ocean Beach Pier in San Diego, United States. No people were found on board, but about six life vests and some other items were recovered from the boat. U.S. Customs and Border Protection investigated the scene, believing the vessel to have possibly been used in smuggling drugs or people into the country.

=== 31 January ===
List of shipwrecks: 31 January 2022
Ship	State	Description
Jerohan	Mexico	The boat encountered heavy waves and strong winds and sank after departing the Port of Celestún on 29 January. The two aboard were rescued.
Julietta D	Malta	Storm Corrie: The German-operated Maltese-flagged bulk carrier was abandoned while sinking at the IJmuiden outer anchorage, in the North Sea after being struck by the tanker Pechora Star (Malta) while at anchor in a storm. Her 18 crew were evacuated by helicopter. Julietta D was subsequently towed in to Rotterdam, South Holland, Netherlands.
Unidentified trawler	Bangladesh	A soil-carrying trawler, owned by the Maishadi AMS Brick Field, collided with the sand barge Iqbal Hossain on the Dakatia River during a dense fog, and promptly capsized. Five of the eleven people on board drowned, while the other six swam to shore. Murder charges were filed against the six crew of Iqbal Hossain. Four have been detained by police, while another two, including the captain, have gone into hiding.

=== Unknown date ===
List of shipwrecks: Unknown date in January 2022
Ship	State	Description
Proteus	Australia	The scallop trawler ran aground along the Rainbow Beach after its anchor slipped due to high winds "sometime that week". Its crew were asleep on board during the incident but were able to disembark the vessel after it grounded. The vessel was recovered on 22 January.

== February ==
=== 1 February ===
List of shipwrecks: 1 February 2022
Ship	State	Description
Bing Bing	United States	The 55-foot (17 m) fishing trawler started listing to starboard, and then capsized. An eyewitness said it started smoking at 2:30 or 2:35 PM, before sinking around 90 seconds later one mile (1.6 km) from the shore of Humarock Beach in Massachusetts, United States. Three survivors were found clinging to a black hose, and pulled from the water at 3:10 PM. Two of the survivors were treated for hypothermia, and ingestion of diesel fuel and sea water, while a third was discharged from hospital.
Torm Emilie	Denmark	The product tanker collided with a breakwater at the Kaohsiung port, and started taking on water, causing a heavy list.

=== 2 February ===
List of shipwrecks: 2 February 2022
Ship	State	Description
Akvanavt	Russia	The crabber vessel sprang a massive leak and sank at dock at Port of Zarubino, Primorsky Krai in the Trinity Bay, in the Sea of Japan while unloading. Her chief engineer died, the other 14 crew were rescued. Her master was hospitalized.
Bite Me	United States	The 32-foot (9.8 m)-long sportsfisher ran aground at 10:00 PM while being assisted by the fishing trawler Reel Lucky in the Outer Inlet in North Carolina, United States during thick fog. The three people aboard were able to disembark after grounding, with no injuries. On 4 February, the vessel was placed down on a trailer and recovered from the beach at 2:00 PM. It was awaiting transport to a shipyard to check for damage and necessary repairs.
Mumbai Maersk	Denmark	The Maersk-operated Triple E-class container ship ran aground on the island of Wangerooge on a voyage from Rotterdam to Bremerhaven. Its 30 crew were uninjured, and there was no fuel leakage. It was towed free by eight vessels on 4 February.
Reel Lucky	United States	The 35-foot (11 m)-long tuna trawler ran aground at 10:00 PM while assisting the sportsfisher Bite Me in the Outer Inlet in North Carolina, United States during thick fog. The two people aboard were able to disembark after grounding, with no injuries. An excavator was used to drag the vessel across the beach to ORV Ramp 4, where it was later picked up and placed on a trailer. On 4 February, at 5:30 PM, the boat was recovered. It was awaiting transport to a shipyard to check for damage and necessary repairs.
Trinity Spirit	Nigeria	The floating production storage and offloading vessel exploded, burned out, and sank in the Ukpokiti oil fields near the Escravos River. Of its 10 crew, three are confirmed dead, three have been rescued, and four are missing. The Nigerian Upstream Petroleum Regulatory Commission, a government organization, has started an investigation into the sinking.
Unnamed migrant boat	Flag unknown	A migrant boat sank off the coast of Fuerteventura, Canary Islands. 40 were rescued, one died, and another 16 were reported missing.

=== 3 February ===
List of shipwrecks: 3 February 2022
Ship	State	Description
Sea Eagle	United States	The United States Navy chartered tugboat sprang a leak and was abandoned 3 miles (4.8 km) east of Hillsboro Beach/Fort Lauderdale, Florida in the Atlantic Ocean. The tug, and a barge loaded with munitions it was towing, drifted ashore between Boca Raton and Deerfield Beach off South Ocean Boulevard. The crew of four was rescued. The barge was refloated 5 February, and the tug on 6 February.
Tresta Star	Mauritius	Cyclone Batsirai: The product tanker ran aground on the southern coast of the French island of Réunion. The crew of 11 Indian and Bangladeshi sailors was rescued. On 18 February, the ship was surveilled by helicopter, which showed that sections were starting to crack, and oil was leaking from the ship. Since then, the cracks worsened, and the salvage contractor working on the ship stopped all procedures.
Unnamed migrant boat	Unknown flag	A migrant boat sank 40 miles (64 km) off of Key Largo, United States. All ten on board were rescued. Six of the migrants were repatriated to Cuba, while the other four were brought to hospital for injuries. The incident is suspected to be related to human smuggling operations.

=== 4 February ===
List of shipwrecks: 4 February 2022
Ship	State	Description
Unidentified trawlers	Bangladesh	18 trawlers sank during a storm on the island of Dublar Char and in the Bay of Bengal. Rescue operations for missing fishermen were ongoing.

=== 7 February ===
List of shipwrecks: 7 February 2022
Ship	State	Description
Glory	United States	The fishing boat sank 9 miles (14 km) south of Sitka, Alaska after taking on water. Its two crew were airlifted by the United States Coast Guard.

=== 8 February ===
List of shipwrecks: 7 February 2022
Ship	State	Description
São Jorge	Portugal	The product tanker grounded near Praia Islet shortly after departing the port of Praia da Graciosa. Its crew of 12 were safe, and the ship was stabilized. Its owners are looking to have the ship refloated and towed away for repairs.
Unidentified dhows	Iran	Seven cargo dhows burned out at Nakhl Taghi port, Bushehr Province, Iran.

=== 9 February ===
List of shipwrecks: 9 february 2022
Ship	State	Description
"Use it again"	France	The 16-metre (52 ft) sail racing trimaran ran aground on rocks in Cook's Bay while racing in the Round the World Record in Reverse. Captain and her other crewman rescued by the Chilian Navy that also refloated the boat.

=== 12 February ===
List of shipwrecks: 12 February 2022
Ship	State	Description
Sceptre	Ireland	The trawler sank at its mooring in the Keelbeg Pier, Union Hall, Ireland, causing a spill of hydraulic fluid and diesel fuel.

=== 14 February ===
List of shipwrecks: 14 February 2022
Ship	State	Description
Villa de Pitanxo	Spain	Capsizing of the Villa de Pitanxo: The 50-metre (160 ft) fishing vessel iced up, capsized and was lost off of Newfoundland, Canada. Of her crew of 24, three were rescued, 10 died, and another 11 were reported missing.

=== 15 February ===
List of shipwrecks: 15 February 2022
Ship	State	Description
QB 98160 TS	Vietnam	The fishing boat sank 15 nautical miles (28 km; 17 mi) south of Cồn Cỏ, Quảng Trị. Her 11 crew were rescued.

=== 16 February ===
List of shipwrecks: 16 February 2022
Ship	State	Description
Makam-3	Bangladesh	The sand barge capsized and sank after colliding with passenger launch Surovi-7 on the Meghna River at 11 PM. One crew member, who, according to survivor testimony, was trapped in the vessel as it sank, was reported missing, and local emergency services conducted a search for him.
Miss Grace	United States	The urchin fishing boat capsized during rough weather in the Santa Barbara Channel. The one crewman swam for five hours before eventually making it to an oil rig, after which he was rescued.

=== 18 February ===
List of shipwrecks: 18 February 2022
Ship	State	Description
Corneligue	Togo	The 58-metre (190 ft) cargo vessel broke loose from its mooring, drifted out into the Hollands Diep waterway, and ran hard aground near the Zwaluwse Dike in Moerdijk, Netherlands. Refloated 18 June, 2026 and towed in November, 2026 to be scrapped.
Euroferry Olympia	Italy	The Hansa-class ferry caught fire off Corfu and was abandoned. About 292 people were on board (239 registered passengers, two stowaways, and 51 crew), of which 281 were rescued and 11 remained unaccounted for as of 20 February. Ten survivors were hospitalized. The ferry was on a voyage from Igoumenitsa, Greece to Brindisi.
Sea Swirl	United States	The 26-foot (7.9 m) boat capsized at about 4:00 PM around 1/4 nautical mile (0.46 km; 0.29 mi) from Kapaa, Hawaii. Two men were found clinging to the top of the boat, and were both rescued, being treated for minor injuries.
Unidentified sailboat	United States	A sailboat capsized at about 2:00 PM off of Hart Miller Island. The two people on board were rescued and later hospitalized.

=== 19 February ===
List of shipwrecks: 19 February 2022
Ship	State	Description
WorldFriend 307	Guyana	The fishing trawler capsized 18 miles (29 km) off the coast of Mahaicony, Guyana. One of the four crew was able to enter a lifeboat and was rescued by nearby fishermen, while the other three were reported missing. The country's government was investigating the incident, and the coast guard continued searching for the three missing men, who were thought to be trapped underneath the vessel.

=== 21 February ===
List of shipwrecks: 21 February 2022
Ship	State	Description
Step Aside	Bermuda	The 22-foot (6.7 m) fishing boat capsized, and possibly sank after its anchor chain caught in its propeller 400 yards (370 m) from the shore of Hungry Bay Nature Reserve, Bermuda. The single man aboard clung to the overturned hull, and was rescued by two nearby fishermen.
Thilaakkam	India	The product tanker ran aground at the Port at Kavaratti on its maiden voyage.

=== 23 February ===
List of shipwrecks: 23 February 2022
Ship	State	Description
Jinn Jyi Chyun No.168	Taiwan	The tuna fishing vessel went ashore at Pointe aux Sables, Mauritius, some 2 nautical miles (3.7 km; 2.3 mi) west of Port Louis. The crew made it to shore.
Maan Yu Feng No.1	Taiwan	The tuna fishing vessel went ashore at Pointe aux Sables, Mauritius, some 2 nautical miles (3.7 km; 2.3 mi) west of Port Louis. The crew made it to shore.
Unidentified boats	India	Several houseboats and shikaras either sank or were destroyed by snowfall on the Jhelum River near Srinagar, India, and in its Dal Lake.
Unidentified ferry	Bangladesh	A 28-metre (92 ft) ferry capsized after colliding with a larger ferry while carrying 42 passengers and three crew. 41 people were rescued, three died, and one was reported missing.
Wen Hung Dar No.168	Taiwan	The tuna fishing vessel went ashore at Pointe aux Sables, Mauritius, some 2 nautical miles (3.7 km; 2.3 mi) west of Port Louis. The crew made it to shore.

=== 24 February ===
List of shipwrecks: 24 February 2022
Ship	State	Description
Unidentified boat	India	A boat capsized on a voyage from Nirsa to Jamtara at about 7:00 PM on the Damodar River. 17 were aboard; five were rescued, and 12 were reported missing.
Yasa Jupiter	Marshall Islands	2022 Russian invasion of Ukraine: The bulk carrier was struck by a missile fired by Russian forces in the Black Sea off Odesa, Ukraine and was damaged. She was on a voyage from the Dniepr to Constanţa, Romania.

=== 25 February ===
List of shipwrecks: 25 February 2022
Ship	State	Description
Millennial Spirit	Moldova	2022 Russian invasion of Ukraine: The tanker was shelled in the Black Sea off the coast of Ukraine. Her ten crew were rescued.
Namura Queen	Panama	2022 Russian invasion of Ukraine: The cargo ship was struck in the Black Sea off the coast of Ukraine by a missile fired by Russian forces. The ship later sailed to Turkey for repairs.

=== 26 February ===
List of shipwrecks: 26 February 2022
Ship	State	Description
Phuong Dong No.5	Vietnam	The tourist speedboat was hit by strong waves, flooded, and capsized around 2:00 PM on a voyage from the Chàm Islands to Hội An. 17 of the 36 passengers and three crew died. A government inquiry blamed the loss of life on lack of emergency exits.

=== 27 February ===
List of shipwrecks: 27 February 2022
Ship	State	Description
Lady Anastasia	Saint Vincent and the Grenadines	2022 Russian invasion of Ukraine: The motor yacht, owned by Russian oligarch Alexander Mijeev, was sabotaged by a Ukrainian mechanic, who attempted to scuttle the ship at Palma de Mallorca, Spain. The ship was later seized by the Spanish authorities due to European Union sanctions against Mijeev.

=== Unknown date ===
List of shipwrecks: Unknown date in February 2022
Ship	State	Description
Unidentified migrant boat	Unknown flag	A migrant boat collided with a trawler on a voyage from Libya. Five passengers fell out of the boat in the collision, but only two were able to re-embark.
Unidentified vessels	Ukrainian Navy	2022 Russian invasion of Ukraine: Eight ships were claimed as destroyed by Russian forces.

== March ==
=== 1 March ===
List of shipwrecks: 1 March 2022
Ship	State	Description
Felicity Ace	Panama	The 200-metre (660 ft) car carrier caught fire in the Atlantic Ocean and was abandoned by her crew on 16 February; then unexpectedly capsized and sank 220 nautical miles (410 km; 250 mi) south of the Azores on 1 March.

=== 2 March ===
List of shipwrecks: 2 March 2022
Ship	State	Description
Banglar Samriddhi	Bangladesh	2022 Russian invasion of Ukraine: The bulk carrier was struck by a Russian missile at Mykolaiv and was set afire. One crew member was killed.
Helt	Panama	2022 Russian invasion of Ukraine: The cargo ship sank 16 nautical miles (30 km; 18 mi) off Odesa, Ukraine; all six crew were rescued. The ship's manager confirmed that the sinking was after an explosion, later adding that it was not thought to be a mine. Helt was also reported to have been previously captured by the Russian Navy and used as a shield against Ukrainian shellfire.
Miss JoAnn	United States	The decommissioned tugboat was scuttled as an artificial reef in the Gulf of Mexico 16 nautical miles (30 km; 18 mi) off East Pass, Destin, Florida.

=== 3 March ===
List of shipwrecks: 3 March 2022
Ship	State	Description
BTh 99458 TS	Vietnam	The fishing boat sank 25 nautical miles (46 km; 29 mi) south of Kê Gà Cape, Bình Thuận. Two of its crew were rescued, three were killed.
Sloviansk	Ukrainian Navy	2022 Russian invasion of Ukraine: The Island-class patrol boat sank after it was hit by a Russian missile while gathering reconnaissance. All crew were reported missing.
Taporo VII	French Polynesia	The ship sank at dock in shallow water at Papeete due to a valve being left open.

=== 6 March ===
List of shipwrecks: 6 March 2022
Ship	State	Description
Carib Trader II	Saint Vincent	The unmanned cargo ship foundered while in tow of tug Capt. Beau (United States) 25 miles (40 km) northwest of Santo Domingo Cay, Bahamas, en route from Miami, Florida to Gonaives, Haiti, due to flooding of the engine room.
Unnamed migrant boat	Haiti	A boat ran aground and capsized off the Florida Keys, United States. Of the estimated 300 migrants aboard, 163 swam to shore.

=== 11 March ===
List of shipwrecks: 11 March 2022
Ship	State	Description
Ayla	Lebanon	The cargo ship capsized and sank at Alexandria, Egypt in rough weather.

=== 13 March ===
List of shipwrecks: 13 March 2022
Ship	State	Description
Ever Forward	Hong Kong	During a voyage from Baltimore, Maryland, to Norfolk, Virginia, the 1,095-foot (334 m), 117,340-gross ton container ship ran aground in the Chesapeake Bay off Gibson Island, Maryland, at (39.11097°N 076.39191°W). The vessel was refloated on 17 April.
PNS Khaibar or PNS Tariq	Pakistan Navy	The decommissioned Tariq-class frigate, believed to be Khaibar or Tariq, was sunk as a target in the northern Arabian Sea by a missile from an aircraft and a missile or torpedo from a submarine in a live-fire exercise.

=== 17 March ===
List of shipwrecks: 17 March 2022
Ship	State	Description
Al Salmy 6	United Arab Emirates	The ro-ro ship capsized and sank in the Persian Gulf 30 miles (48 km) from Asaluyeh, Iran in rough weather. 29 of 30 crew were rescued.

=== 20 March ===
List of shipwrecks: 20 March 2022
Ship	State	Description
Afsar Uddin	Bangladesh	The ferry capsized in the Meghna River in Narayanganj, just outside Dhaka, Bangladesh when it was struck by the cargo ship Rupshi 9 (Bangladesh). Six people were killed, dozens reported missing.

=== 21 March ===
List of shipwrecks: 21 March 2022
Ship	State	Description
Lake Superior	United States	The laid up tug partially sank at Duluth, Minnesota, after being laid up since 2007. She was refloated on 24 May and remained laid up.

=== 22 March ===
List of shipwrecks: 22 March 2022
Ship	State	Description
Prestige	Mongolia	The cargo ship capsized and sank in the Taiwan Strait some 55 nautical miles (102 km; 63 mi) west north west of Taichung, Taiwan after being caught in rough weather. Seven people were rescued, one was reported missing.

=== 24 March ===
List of shipwrecks: 24 March 2022
Ship	State	Description
Marintrust 01	Bangladesh	The container ship capsized and sank on her portside at a pier in Kolkata, India.
Novocherkassk	Russian Navy	2022 Russian invasion of Ukraine, Battle of Berdiansk: The Ropucha-class landing ship was damaged in a Ukrainian attack at Berdiansk.
Saratov	Russian Navy	2022 Russian invasion of Ukraine, Battle of Berdiansk: The Alligator-class landing ship was destroyed by Ukrainian shellfire at Berdiansk.
Tsezar Kunikov	Russian Navy	2022 Russian invasion of Ukraine, Battle of Berdiansk: The Ropucha-class landing ship was damaged in a Ukrainian attack at Berdiansk, Ukraine.

=== 27 March ===
List of shipwrecks: 27 March 2022
Ship	State	Description
Omskiy-205	Russia	The cargo ship became flooded in its engine room in the Kertch Strait. The vessel was on a voyage from Istanbul, Turkey to Rostov-on-Don. Unclear if the ship was hit by a rogue wave, or a casualty of the 2022 Russian invasion of Ukraine.

== April ==
=== 3 April ===
List of shipwrecks: 3 April 2022
Ship	State	Description
Barugu	Nigeria	The patrol boat operated by the Nigerian Maritime Administration and Safety Agency sank in the harbour of Lagos, Nigeria.

=== 4 April ===
List of shipwrecks: 4 April 2022
Ship	State	Description
Azburg	Dominica	2022 Russian invasion of Ukraine, Battle of Mariupol: The cargo ship was shelled and sunk at Mariupol after being damaged the day before by Russian missiles.

=== 7 April ===
List of shipwrecks: 7 April 2022
Ship	State	Description
Kyoto 1	Sierra Leone	The push tug sank between the Penghu Islands and the western Taiwan coast in the Taiwan Strait. All six crew were reported missing.
Truong Nguyen 136	Vietnam	The cargo ship was sunk in a collision with Vinafco 28 (Vietnam) in the South China Sea off Tam Quan, Vietnam. Nine crew were rescued by Vinafco 28, one was reported missing.

=== 9 April ===
List of shipwrecks: 9 April 2022
Ship	State	Description
Celsa-2	Philippines	Tropical Storm Megi: The coaster capsized and sank in Ormoc Bay, Leyte, Philippine Islands. Crew fate unknown.

=== 10 April ===
List of shipwrecks: 10 April 2022
Ship	State	Description
Mika Mari 1	Philippines	Tropical Storm Megi: The ro-ro ferry submerged while it was docked at the Consuelo Port in Camotes Islands, Cebu. There were no passengers on board the vessel when the incident happened. All 14 crew members managed to abandon the ship before it went down.

=== 13 April ===
List of shipwrecks: 13 April 2022
Ship	State	Description
Unknown boat	Unknown	A boat carrying 35 people capsized in Shagari, Nigeria killing 29 people.

=== 14 April ===
List of shipwrecks: 14 April 2022
Ship	State	Description
Moskva	Russian Navy	2022 Russian invasion of Ukraine: The Slava-class cruiser was hit by two Neptune missiles fired by Ukrainians. The cruiser caught fire and was abandoned by its crew. Moskva subsequently sank. Twenty crew were killed, twenty-four crew members wounded, and eight went missing.
USS The Sullivans	United States	USS The Sullivans on 15 April 2022. The museum ship, a retired United States Navy Fletcher-class destroyer, suffered a serious hull breach and sank at its berth in Buffalo, New York, with a severe starboard list. Most holes were plugged and the vessel was pumped out and floating on an even keel 16 days later.

=== 15 April ===
List of shipwrecks: 15 April 2022
Ship	State	Description
Xelo	Equatorial Guinea	The bunker tanker sank off Gabès, Tunisia, in the Gulf of Gabes. The crew were rescued by the Tunisian Navy.

=== 19 April ===
List of shipwrecks: 19 April 2022
Ship	State	Description
Seiko 5000	Japan	The floating dock listed and sank at Saka, Hiroshima Prefecture, Japan.

=== 20 April ===
List of shipwrecks: 21 April 2022
Ship	State	Description
Phuc Tinh 26	Vietnam	The cargo ship sank in shallow water with her bow above water in Phan Rang Bay during an attempted beaching following a collision with the cargo ship Hai Dat 36 (Vietnam) off Ninh Thuận province, Vietnam. The crew were rescued by Hai Dat 36.

=== 21 April ===
List of shipwrecks: 21 April 2022
Ship	State	Description
Wei Yang 28	China	The cargo ship sank in shallow water, mostly above water, in Linjiang River when it collided with the Linjiang Bridge.

=== 23 April ===
List of shipwrecks: 23 April 2022
Ship	State	Description
Kazu I	Japan	The 19-ton sight seeing boat sent a distress signal off the western coast of Shiretoko Peninsula in the Shiretoko National Park, Hokkaido, Japan and presumably sunk. The boat was carrying 24 passengers and had 2 crew. As of 24 April, 11 of its occupants have been found dead and 15 others reported missing.
Unknown boat	Lebanon	An illegal immigrant smuggling boat sank after colliding with, or being rammed by, a Lebanese Navy patrol boat off Tripoli, Lebanon. 47 people were rescued, 7 died.

=== 24 April ===
List of shipwrecks: 24 April 2022
Ship	State	Description
Unknown barge	Chile	A barge, that had been deck cargo aboard the cargo ship Puerto Natales (Chile), sank after being lost overboard in rough seas between Juan Fernandez Islands, Chile and Puerto Montt, Chile.

=== 26 April ===
List of shipwrecks: 26 April 2022
Ship	State	Description
Da Fa No.1	Taiwan	The general cargo ship sank after colliding with the oil tanker LIA (Liberia) 15 nautical miles (28 km; 17 mi) southeast of Taitung, Taiwan off the southeast Taiwan coast. Its crew were all rescued by the Taiwan Coast Guard.

=== 27 April ===
List of shipwrecks: 27 April 2022
Ship	State	Description
ARM Abasolo	Mexican Navy	The Allende-class frigate was sunk as an artificial reef 35 nautical miles (65 km; 40 mi) east of Tuxpan, Mexico.

=== 28 April ===
List of shipwrecks: 28 April 2022
Ship	State	Description
Courageous	United States	The decommissioned cargo ship was bombed, broke in two and sunk as a target by a United States Air Force McDonnell Douglas F-15E Strike Eagle aircraft in the Gulf of Mexico in the Eglin Gulf Test and Training Range in 180 feet (55 m) of water.

=== Unknown date ===
List of shipwrecks: Unknown date in April 2022
Ship	State	Description
Donbas	Ukrainian Navy	2022 Russian invasion of Ukraine, Siege of Mariupol: Satellite images published on 6 April 2022 showed the logistics ship Donbas engulfed in heavy smoke in the port of Mariupol, indicating the ship was likely hit. On 16 April 2022, Ukrainian Defence Ministry confirmed the ship was destroyed during the Siege of Mariupol.

== May ==
=== 2 May ===
List of shipwrecks: 2 May 2022
Ship	State	Description
Two patrol boats	Russian Navy	2022 Russian invasion of Ukraine: Two Raptor-class patrol boats were sunk by a Ukrainian Bayraktar TB-2 drone off Snake Island in the Black Sea.

=== 3 May ===
List of shipwrecks: 3 May 2022
Ship	State	Description
Microstep	Panama	The cargo ship ran aground in the China Strait. Milne Bay, Papua New Guinea. The cargo was partially lightered on 8 May and the vessel refloated.

=== 7 May ===
List of shipwrecks: 7 May 2022
Ship	State	Description
DSHK-1 Stanislav	Ukrainian Navy	2022 Russian invasion of Ukraine: The Centaur-class fast attack craft was claimed as destroyed off Snake Island in the Black Sea by Russian military sources.
Permata Asia	Indonesia	The cargo ship sprang a leak and sank in the Flores Sea some 2 nautical miles (3.7 km; 2.3 mi) off the northern coast of Sangeang Island, Bima, West Nusa Tenggara, Lesser Sunda Islands, Indonesia. The vessel's crew was rescued.
Unknown landing craft	Russian Navy	2022 Russian invasion of Ukraine: A Ukrainian Bayraktar TB-2 drone struck a Serna-class landing craft near Snake Island in the Black Sea.

=== 9 May ===
List of shipwrecks: 9 May 2022
Ship	State	Description
Comforter 2	Ghana	The fishing vessel sank off the Gulf of Guinea near Accra. The boat was carrying at least 27 people. 15 people were rescued, and the captain's body was recovered. An additional 11 people were reported missing. The boat was carrying fish, as well as 6 Chinese and 21 Ghanaian fishermen.

=== 11 May ===
List of shipwrecks: 11 May 2022
Ship	State	Description
Cormorant 1	Ecuador	The tourism catamaran caught fire, burned out and sank in the Galápagos Islands. All 25 on board were rescued.

=== 12 May ===
List of shipwrecks: 12 May 2022
Ship	State	Description
Unknown migrant vessel	Puerto Rico	A migrant vessel carrying mainly Haitian migrants sank around 10 miles (16 km) north of Desecheo Island, Puerto Rico. 38 people were rescued by the United States Coast Guard.
Vsevelod Bobrov	Russian Navy	2022 Russian invasion of Ukraine: The logistics support vessel was reported to have been set afire off Snake Island, Ukraine. The ship was later reported to have reached port in Sevastopol without visible damage.

=== 14 May ===
List of shipwrecks: 14 May 2022
Ship	State	Description
Meisen 2	Japan	The freighter developed a heavy starboard list and was apparently beached with its starboard side on the bottom to prevent sinking in Chiba Prefecture waters, Honshu east coast, south of Tokyo, Japan. Its five crew were rescued from a life raft.

=== 15 May ===
List of shipwrecks: 15 May 2022
Ship	State	Description
Last One	United States	The retired 98-foot (29.9 m) yacht, renamed Capt. Patrick Price Reef for the occasion, was scuttled in 180 feet (55 m) of water in the Atlantic Ocean off St. Lucie County, Florida, to create an artificial reef.

=== 16 May ===
List of shipwrecks: 16 May 2022
Ship	State	Description
Spirit of Palm Beach	United States	The retired 65-foot (19.8 m) party boat, renamed Daymaker for the occasion, was scuttled in 100 feet (30 m) of water in the Atlantic Ocean off St. Lucie County, Florida, to create an artificial reef.

=== 18 May ===
List of shipwrecks: 18 May 2022
Ship	State	Description
Franco P	Italy	The tugboat sank in the Adriatic Sea 50 nautical miles (93 km) off Bari, Italy. The captain was rescued, three people were killed, and the other two crew were reported missing. A float the tugboat was towing with 11 on board was later towed into port.
Tamim	Bangladesh	The lightering cargo ship sank in the estuary of the Meghna River in Lakshmipur, Bangladesh, after hitting an underwater object. The ship rested on bottom of the sea canal with superstructure remaining above waterline. All 12 crew were rescued.

=== 23 May ===
List of shipwrecks: 23 May 2022
Ship	State	Description
Mercraft 2	Philippines	The ferry caught fire off Baluti Island approximately 1,000 yards (910 m) from the port of Real, Quezon, Philippines. It burned out and was towed, beached on shore. Seven passengers were killed, including the captain's mother, 120 others were rescued.

=== 27 May ===
List of shipwrecks: 27 May 2022
Ship	State	Description
Caleb	United States	The derelict World War II-era tugboat was owned by the Zizians at the time of its sinking at Pillar Point Harbor, California.
Cetus	Comoros	The tanker capsized and sank 135 nautical miles (250 km; 155 mi) north of Aruba in the Caribbean Sea in bad weather. Nine survivors were rescued by cargo ship Melba (Panama), and five by UBC Stavanger (Cyprus), the ship's dog was also rescued. Cetus' captain died after being rescued and two others were reported missing.

=== 28 May ===
List of shipwrecks: 28 May 2022
Ship	State	Description
Rendezvous	United Kingdom	The yacht caught fire, burned out and sank after a possible explosion at Princess Pier in Torquay, Devon, United Kingdom.
Unknown fishing vessel	Philippines	A fishing vessel was sunk in a collision with Happy Hiro (Marshall Islands) in the Sulu Sea. 13 crew were rescued by other fishing vessels, 7 crew were reported missing.

=== 31 May ===
List of shipwrecks: 31 May 2022
Ship	State	Description
Chuan I Shin	Taiwan	The tuna longliner ran aground on the protected Beveridge Reef, some 150 nautical miles (280 km; 170 mi) southeast of Niue, in the Pacific Ocean. The vessel was still aground as of 4 June.

== June ==
=== 7 June ===
List of shipwrecks: 7 June 2022
Ship	State	Description
Spirit of Norfolk	United States	The charter cruise yacht caught fire off Naval Station Norfolk, Virginia, United States, with 106 people aboard. All were rescued. The fire ended around 9 June. Scuttled off Destin, Florida in late June 2025 as an artificial reef in 128-foot (39 m) of water in the Gulf of Mexico.

=== 8 June ===
List of shipwrecks: 8 June 2022
Ship	State	Description
Moamaeu	Kiribati	The tuna longliner sank in a collision with Viva Fafa No. 707 (Taiwan) 310 nautical miles (570 km) east of Rabaul, East New Britain province of Papua New Guinea in the Pacific Ocean. 31 crew were rescued.

=== 8 June ===
List of shipwrecks: 8 June 2022
Ship	State	Description
Unknown yacht	Australia	A 90-foot (27 m) yacht went aground on rocks and sank in bad weather at Lammermoor Beach, Queensland, Australia.

=== 10 June ===
List of shipwrecks: 10 June 2022
Ship	State	Description
Eleonora E	United Kingdom	The sailing yacht sank at a pier when rammed by the tug Punta Mayor (Spain) at Tarragona, Spain. The tug suffered a control problem while backing resulting in the high speed ramming, crushing the yacht's side.

=== 12 June ===
List of shipwrecks: 12 June 2022
Ship	State	Description
Badr 1	Sudan	The livestock ship capsized and sank along pier at Suakin, Sudan, in the Red Sea loaded with sheep or cattle. The vessel was resting with its starboard side on the bottom, remaining partially above water. Badr 1's crew survived.

=== 14 June ===
List of shipwrecks: 14 June 2022
Ship	State	Description
Ocean S Star	St. Kitts and Nevis	The laid up specialized fishing vessel was beached, laying on her port side, by heavy swells on Oquendo Beach, Callao, Peru.

=== 17 June ===
List of shipwrecks: 17 June 2022
Ship	State	Description
Spasatel Vasily Bekh	Russian Navy	2022 Russian invasion of Ukraine: The rescue tug was reported sunk by two Ukrainian Harpoon missiles in the Black Sea while transporting personnel, weapons and ammunition to the occupied Snake Island.

=== 18 June ===
List of shipwrecks: 18 June 2022
Ship	State	Description
Lider Bulut	Cameroon	The car carrier developed a list and was run aground to prevent capsizing off Tuapse, Russia, in the Black Sea.
Too Elusive	United States	The 72-foot (22 m) cabin cruiser burned in the Piscataqua River near New Castle, New Hampshire.
Unknown fishing boat	United States	A 42-foot (13 m) fishing boat burned to the waterline two miles (3.2 km) west of Manzanita, Oregon. The sole crewman aboard was rescued from the water.

=== 20 June ===
List of shipwrecks: 20 June 2022
Ship	State	Description
Jumbo Floating Restaurant	Hong Kong	The floating restaurant, usually situated in Hong Kong, capsized in the South China Sea near the Paracel Islands while under tow for restoration work. Reportedly still afloat, capsized and unsalvageable, on 25 June.
Petr Godovanets, or Ukraine	Russia	2022 Russian invasion of Ukraine: One or the other of the oil field jackup rigs was destroyed by a Ukrainian missile in the Black Sea. The other, plus Tavrida (Russia) was damaged.

=== 22 June ===
List of shipwrecks: 22 June 2022
Ship	State	Description
Nam Thinh 126	Vietnam	The cargo ship suffered cargo shift at anchor in heavy swells causing the vessel to capsize and sink off Hải Phòng, Vietnam. Its eight crew and two passengers were rescued.

=== 23 June ===
List of shipwrecks: 23 June 2022
Ship	State	Description
Anugerah Indasah	Indonesia	The landing craft sank in waters of Tanah Laut Regency, South Kalimantan Province, Indonesia in the Java Sea. Five of its crew were rescued, six reported missing.
Princess Miral	Belize	The cargo ship spring a leak and was run aground to prevent sinking off Mangalore, India, in the Arabian Sea. Its crew was rescued. It fully sunk on 23 June.

=== 26 June ===
List of shipwrecks: 26 June 2022
Ship	State	Description
Mama Mary Chloe	Philippines	The ferry was destroyed by fire off the west coast of Leyte. 157 passengers and 8 crew were on board and all but 2 people were rescued. One person died and one was reported missing.

=== 29 June ===
List of shipwrecks: 29 June 2022
Ship	State	Description
Texas Star	United States	The 180-foot (55 m) vessel — a former floating casino later used as a commercial scallop-fishing and -processing boat — was scuttled in the Atlantic Ocean in 86 feet (26 m) of water 16 nautical miles (30 km; 18 mi) off the coast of Delaware at 38°40.494′N 074°43.868′W to form part of an artificial reef system.

== July ==
=== 1 July ===
List of shipwrecks: 1 July 2022
Ship	State	Description
Cats N Dawgs	United States	The 66-foot (20 m) yacht sank in 150 feet (46 m) of water in Glacier Bay, Alaska. The four people on board were rescued by Alaska Hunter (United States) and then were transferred to an Sikorsky MH-60 Jayhawk helicopter from Air Station Sitka.

=== 2 July ===
List of shipwrecks: 2 July 2022
Ship	State	Description
Aviva 80	Philippines	The deck cargo ship went aground in stormy weather off Barangay Bani, Zambales, central Luzon western coast. 22 people were rescued, while the ship's captain and chief officer remained aboard.
Fu Jing 001	China	Typhoon Chaba: The offshore construction ship broke in two and sank in South China Sea 160 nautical miles (300 km; 180 mi) southwest of Hong Kong. Of the 30 personnel on board, three were rescued quickly, one additional survivor was rescued on 4 July. 12 people were killed and 14 were reported missing.
Tian Long	Sierra Leone	Typhoon Chaba: The cargo ship was beached in Yangjiang City, Yangxi County, Guangdong Province, China in the South China Sea.

=== 5 July ===
List of shipwrecks: 5 July 2022
Ship	State	Description
Daha	St. Kitts and Nevis	The passenger ro-ro ship was reported sinking in stormy weather in the Arabian Sea off the coast of Oman.
KMN Harapan Baru	Indonesia	The fishing vessel was sunk in a collision when she was towed into the path of the coaster KM Lintas Damai 5 (Indonesia) off Tanakeke Island, south of Makassar, South Sulawesi, Indonesia. All 15 people on board were rescued.

=== 6 July ===
List of shipwrecks: 6 July 2022
Ship	State	Description
Global King 1	Panama	The tanker reported taking on water and sinking in the Arabian Sea some 70 nautical miles (130 km; 81 mi) west of the northwest coast of India. The crew were rescued by the Indian Coast Guard.
Heimdall	Chile	The fish carrier ran aground and partially sank in southern Chile, some 100 nautical miles (190 km; 120 mi) west of Punta Arenas. The ship was resting on the bottom, capsized on its starboard side and partially submerged. 13 crew went into life rafts and were rescued.

=== 7 July ===
List of shipwrecks: 7 July 2022
Ship	State	Description
Quaterdecies	Panama	The cargo ship reported sinking in the Ionian Sea. The crew abandoned ship.

=== 11 July ===
List of shipwrecks: 11 July 2022
Ship	State	Description
NĐ 3525	Vietnam	The coastal cargo ship was swamped by large waves in a storm causing her to sink in shallow waters of the Van Uc River estuary, Hải Phòng, Vietnam off the Gulf of Tonkin. Its superstructure remained above water. The vessel's five crew were rescued by Vietnam Border Guards.

=== 12 July ===
List of shipwrecks: 12 July 2022
Ship	State	Description
USS Rodney M. Davis	United States Navy	USS Rodney M. Davis The decommissioned Oliver Hazard Perry-class guided-missile frigate was sunk during a sinking exercise (SINKEX), as part of a multinational exercise Rim of the Pacific (RIMPAC) 2022, approximately 50 nautical miles (93 km; 58 mi) northwest of Kauai, Hawaii. The vessel was hit by Paveway laser-guided bombs dropped by U.S. Navy F/A-18E/F Super Hornet aircraft and United States Marine Corps F-35C Lightning II aircraft from Carrier Air Wing 9 operating from the aircraft carrier USS Abraham Lincoln. U.S., Canadian, Australian, and Malaysian aircraft all attacked the target, sinking it in 15,000 feet (4,600 m) of water in the Pacific Ocean.

=== 22 July ===
List of shipwrecks: 22 July 2022
Ship	State	Description
USS Denver	United States Navy	The decommissioned Austin-class amphibious transport dock was sunk during a sinking exercise (SINKEX), as part of a multinational exercise Rim of the Pacific (RIMPAC) 2022, approximately 50 nautical miles (93 km; 58 mi) northwest of Kauai, Hawaii. The ship was hit by U.S. Navy F/A-18F Super Hornet aircraft long range anti-ship missile; United States Army AH-64 Apache helicopters shot air-to-ground Hellfire missiles, rockets, and 30 mm (1.2 in) guns; and United States Marine Corps F/A-18C/D Hornet aircraft fired AGM-88 HARM missiles, followed by a Harpoon missile, and JDAMs. The vessel was also shelled by USS Chafee (United States Navy) with its Mark 45 5-inch (130 mm) gun, and Japanese Self Defense Force Type 12 surface-to-ship missiles and the U.S. Army High Mobility Artillery Rocket System, sinking her in 15,000 feet (4,600 m) of water in the Pacific Ocean.

=== 23 July ===
List of shipwrecks: 23 July 2022
Ship	State	Description
Blue Dragon 12	Indonesia	The tugboat sank after an explosion on board at Semoi Setawir, Sepaku River, upstream from Balikpapan, East Kalimantan, Indonesia. Four people were burned, one reported missing, and seven rescued.

=== 25 July ===
List of shipwrecks: 25 July 2022
Ship	State	Description
BTh 98750 TS	Vietnam	The fishing vessel was sunk in a collision with the container ship Morning Vinafco (Vietnam) 30 nautical miles (56 km; 35 mi) east of Vũng Tàu, Vietnam. Its four crew were rescued by Morning Vinafco.

=== 31 July ===
List of shipwrecks: 31 July 2022
Ship	State	Description
Maya	Japan	The container ship capsized and sank on its port side partially above water at berth at Shunan's Port, Honshu, Japan in Tokuyama Bay. The three crew aboard at the time were safe.

=== Unknown date ===
List of shipwrecks: Unknown date July 2022
Ship	State	Description
Chang He	Sierra Leone	The cargo ship reportedly sank in Indian Ocean off eastern Somalia coast, on 14 or 15 July. Its 12 crew abandoned ship.
TBS 3301	Indonesia	The barge developed a port list in bad weather in mid July off Kangean island in the Java Sea while under tow. It was towed to Celukan Bawang, Bali, arriving on 29 July. The vessel partially sank with part on the bottom and partially above water at an unknown date.

== August ==
=== 3 August ===
List of shipwrecks: 3 August 2022
Ship	State	Description
Good Vibes		The 108-foot (33 m) yacht caught fire while cruising the marine reserve of Es Freus, situated between Ibiza and Formentera, Spain. The yacht was towed to port, and the fire was extinguished, but the vessel capsized.

=== 7 August ===
List of shipwrecks: 7 August 2022
Ship	State	Description
Xinghang XH486	China	The coastal cargo ship was sunk in a collision with the container ship BF Tiger (Antigua and Barbuda) southeast of Ningbo, Zhejiang province, China in the East China Sea. One of its four crew was killed.

=== 10 August ===
List of shipwrecks: 10 August 2022
Ship	State	Description
Cleo	Italy	The motor yacht sank at Unije, Croatia. All four people on board survived.

=== 11 August ===
List of shipwrecks: 11 August 2022
Ship	State	Description
Aria SF	Malta	The 45-metre (148 ft) superyacht was destroyed by fire and sank off Formentera, Spain close to Cap Martinet. The wreck was raised several months later and scrapped.

=== 13 August ===
List of shipwrecks: 13 August 2022
Ship	State	Description
Aleutian Isle	United States	A day after a close call running aground, the purse seiner sank in the Haro Strait off San Juan Island. All five crew members were rescued by two nearby purse seiners. The resulting diesel spill became an environmental disaster threatening the southern resident orcas living in nearby waters, leading to a weeks-long cleanup effort by the United States Coast Guard, the Washington State Department of Ecology, San Juan Office of Emergency Management, and the Swinomish Tribe.

=== 17 August ===
List of shipwrecks: 17 August 2022
Ship	State	Description
Unknown fishing vessel	South Korea	A fishing vessel was sunk in a collision with the cargo ship DK Itonia (Panama) off the west coast of Taean County, South Korea, in the Yellow Sea. All 11 crew were rescued by DK Itonia.

=== 20 August ===
List of shipwrecks: 20 August 2022
Ship	State	Description
My Saga	Cayman Islands	The motor yacht sank under tow 9 nautical miles (17 km; 10 mi) off Catanzaro Marina, in the Gulf of Squillace, Calabria, Italy. All nine crew were safe.
Xin Hai 99	Belize	The cargo ship was damaged in a collision with the chemical tanker Ryoshin Maru (Japan) two nautical miles (3.7 km; 2.3 mi) off Kushimoto, Wakayama Prefecture, southeastern Honshu, Japan. The vessel sailed or was towed into a bay off Shionomisaki and run aground to prevent sinking.

=== 22 August ===
List of shipwrecks: 22 August 2022
Ship	State	Description
KM Teman Niaga	Indonesia	The cargo ship sank in the Makassar Strait. The loss was not known until 25 August, when four survivors, climbing to capsized lifeboat, were spotted and rescued by the passing ferry Dharma Ferry III (Indonesia), 11 of the crew were reported missing.

=== 23 August ===
List of shipwrecks: 23 August 2022
Ship	State	Description
Miss Nelly	United States	The decommissioned 62.5-foot (19.1 m) tugboat was sunk as an artificial reef in the Gulf of Mexico about 21 nautical miles (39 km; 24 mi) southeast of the Destin East Pass, Florida at a depth of about 112 feet (34 m).

=== 24 August ===
List of shipwrecks: 24 August 2022
Ship	State	Description
Pyhäranta	Finnish Navy	The Pansio-class minelayer ran aground in the Archipelago Sea, off Turku, Finland. Its hull was holed.

=== 26 August ===
List of shipwrecks: 26 August 2022
Ship	State	Description
Asia Philippines	Philippines	The inter-island ferry caught fire while approaching Batangas City, Philippines. All 85 people on board, including 47 passengers and 38 crew, were safely rescued.

=== 29 August ===
List of shipwrecks: 29 August 2022
Ship	State	Description
Hephaestus	Togo	The decommissioned oil tanker, which had previously ran aground at Qawra on 10 February 2018, was deliberately scuttled as an artificial reef off Xatt l-Aħmar, Gozo in Malta.
OS 35	Tuvalu	The cargo ship was damaged when she struck the anchored LNG tanker Adam LNG (Marshall Islands) off Gibraltar Point. Water ingress could not be put under control, so the ship was grounded in Catalan Bay, to avoid sinking. On 16 September it was scuttled to prevent more damage due to approaching bad weather. Deemed "damaged beyond repair", scrapping in place was under way by December 2022, and is expected to be completed by 30 May 2023.

== September ==
=== 2 September ===
List of shipwrecks: 2 September 2022
Ship	State	Description
007	United Kingdom	The 160-foot (49 m) superyacht sank in Kolona Bay, Kythnos Island, Greece, in the Aegean Sea after its depth finder failed and the vessel scraped bottom. The ship partially rolled over and sank, with its port side on the bottom and half of the hull remaining above the waterline. Five people were rescued and ten reported missing.

=== 7 September ===
List of shipwrecks: 7 September 2022
Ship	State	Description
USS Boone	United States Navy	The decommissioned Oliver Hazard Perry-class guided-missile frigate was sunk as a target in the North Atlantic Ocean during a SINKEX exercise.
Cordonazo		The 67-foot (20 m) sailboat, that burned out in December 2021, was sunk as an artificial reef 14.8 nautical miles (27.4 km; 17.0 mi) south-south-west of East Pass, Destin, Florida in 113 feet (34 m) of water in the Gulf of Mexico.

=== 8 September ===
List of shipwrecks: 8 September 2022
Ship	State	Description
Ha An 01	Vietnam	The tanker sank at anchor in bad weather off Diêm Điền port channel, Thái Bình Province, Vietnam in shallow water with its superstructure remaining partially above water.

=== 9 September ===
List of shipwrecks: 9 September 2022
Ship	State	Description
Helge	Netherlands	The 292-foot (89 m) coaster sank after a collision with Wild Cosmos (Bahamas) in the North Sea off western Denmark. Seven crewmembers jumped into the sea and were rescued by helicopters.

=== 24 September ===
List of shipwrecks: 24 September 2022
Ship	State	Description
Unnamed boat	Western Sahara	An inflatable boat carrying 34 migrants from the Western Sahara encountered rough seas en route to the Canary Islands. The boat was discovered on 1 October with only one survivor; four bodies were found and the remaining 29 were unaccounted for.

=== 27 September ===
List of shipwrecks: 27 September 2022
Ship	State	Description
Sabuk Nusantara 46	Indonesia	The passenger/cargo ship ran aground on the south coast of South Bengkulu Regency, Bengkulu, Indonesia. The vessel sank in shallow water, partially submerged, when pulled off on 16 October.

=== Unknown date ===
List of shipwrecks: unknown September 2022
Ship	State	Description
Sea Eagle	Togo	On the night of 17/18 September while unloading the cargo ship rolled to port and sank at dock at Iskenderun, Turkey, partially above water. A number of containers were lost overboard. Salvage reportedly under way.

== October ==
=== 2 October ===
List of shipwrecks: 2 October 2022
Ship	State	Description
Baltiskaya	Russia	The dredge sank at Makhachkala Port, Dagestan, Russia, in the Caspian Sea in stormy weather. The crew was safe.
Thanh Dat 18 BLC	Vietnam	The cargo ship sank in shallow water with upper deck above water off Hải Phòng, Vietnam possibly due to a typhoon. The crew was safe.

=== 7 October ===
List of shipwrecks: 7 October 2022
Ship	State	Description
Unnamed motorboat	Nigeria	A motorboat, carrying 85 people fleeing floods in Anambra State, sank in the Niger River when it struck a submerged bridge. There were 76 deaths.

=== 11 October ===
List of shipwrecks: 11 October 2022
Ship	State	Description
Maha Nakhon 2	Thailand	The barge while under tow was sunk in a collision with the container ship Vasi Star (Liberia) in poor visibility in the Bangkok approach channel near red buoy No. 23, Samut Prakan waters. The crew was safe.

=== 13 October ===
List of shipwrecks: 13 October 2022
Ship	State	Description
TSS Pearl	Panama	The container ship sank in the Red Sea after catching fire on 6 October. The crew were rescued at the time by a passing tanker.

=== 15 October ===
List of shipwrecks: 15 October 2022
Ship	State	Description
Kelsey 2	South Korea	The tanker sank in the Taiwan Strait 25 nautical miles (46 km; 29 mi) south of Wuqui Island, Kinmen County, Taiwan. One crewman died, the other 19 were rescued.

=== 19 October ===
List of shipwrecks: 19 October 2022
Ship	State	Description
KM Satya Kencana 3	Indonesia	The ro-ro ferry rolled onto its port side and sank partially above water at dock at Kumai port, South Kalimantan, Borneo, Indonesia.
Unknown fishing vessel	Italy	A fishing vessel was sunk in a collision with the cargo ship Mika (Denmark) 11 nautical miles (20 km; 13 mi) off Ravenna, Italy. Mika rescued its five-man crew.

=== 28 October ===
List of shipwrecks: 28 October 2022
Ship	State	Description
De Xing	Taiwan	The cargo ship was struck, broke in two, and sunk by an unknown ship west of Penghu, Taiwan, in the Taiwan Strait. Nine crew were rescued and two were killed. The ship's captain and one crewmember were reported missing.
Tremont	United States	The 115-foot (35 m) fishing vessel was sunk in a collision with the container ship MSC Rita (Panama) 60 miles (97 km) off the coast of Virginia, 95 miles (153 km) north east of Norfolk, Virginia, in the Atlantic Ocean. 12 on board went into a life raft and were picked up by Atlantis (United States), the vessel's captain was taken off by a United States Coast Guard helicopter.

=== 29 October ===
List of shipwrecks: 28 October 2022
Ship	State	Description
Ivan Golubets	Russia	Ukrainian forces used an unmanned aerial and submarine vehicle to strike Russian forces in Sevastopol, Crimea. According to Russia, the Natya-class minesweeper Ivan Golubets was damaged.

=== 31 October ===
List of shipwrecks: 31 October 2022
Ship	State	Description
Unknown fishing vessel	China	A 37 m (121 ft 5 in) fishing vessel was sunk in a collision with the bulk carrier Cape Brilliance (Singapore) 42 nmi (78 km; 48 mi) east of the Yangtze River estuary. Three crew were rescued, 11 crewmembers reported missing.
Xing Shun No. 1	Panama	Typhoon Nalgae: The cement carrier lost power and sank in rough seas on the east side of the Changhua wind farm channel south west of Taiwan. Five crew were rescued, 12 crewmembers reported missing.

=== Unknown date ===
List of shipwrecks: Unknown date in October
Ship	State	Description
Al Awam	Mauritania	The fisheries research vessel, laid up for a year waiting repairs at Nouadhibou, sank, and was partially submerged, on or before 9 October.

== November ==
=== 3 November ===
List of shipwrecks: 3 November 2022
Ship	State	Description
Suntudsamut 4	Thailand	The coastal container ship listed, then capsized and sank 4.8 nautical miles (8.9 km; 5.5 mi) off Sai Ri Sawi Beach, Chumphon Province, Thailand, in the Gulf of Thailand. All ten crew were rescued by fishing vessels.

=== 12 November ===
List of shipwrecks: 12 November 2022
Ship	State	Description
Unknown fishing vessel	Unknown	A fishing vessel was cut in two and sunk when rammed by Bungo Princess (Panama) north of Keelung, Taiwan in dense fog. All seven crew were rescued.

=== 16 November ===
List of shipwrecks: 16 November 2022
Ship	State	Description
Mutiara Timur I	Indonesia	The ferry caught fire some two nautical miles (3.7 km; 2.3 mi) off the eastern coast of Bali, Indonesia. The vessel capsized and sank on its side on 17 November. All 270 on board were rescued.

=== 26 November ===
List of shipwrecks: 26 November 2022
Ship	State	Description
Gogland Reefer	Russia	The reefer ran aground in Kola Bay, in the Barents Sea along the coast of Russia after the vessel left Murmansk on 26 November, remaining aground until 9 December. Salvage was mentioned, with involvement of three tugs, though local media claims the ship ran aground on 9 December.

=== 30 November ===
List of shipwrecks: 30 November 2022
Ship	State	Description
Yu Sheng 788	China	The cargo ship sank in rough weather in Fujian Province waters in the Taiwan Strait. All 13 crew were rescued.

== December ==
=== 1 December ===
List of shipwrecks: 1 December 2022
Ship	State	Description
Serasi 1	Indonesia	The vehicle carrier was sunk in a collision with Batanghari Mas (Indonesia) in the Bangka Strait, Bangka Belitung Islands. All 17 crew were rescued.

=== 5 December ===
List of shipwrecks: 5 December 2022
Ship	State	Description
Hoa Lu 02	Vietnam	The cargo ship suffered main engine failure and started taking on water and apparently sank, or was run aground, in shallow water in the Gulf of Tonkin. The vessel was partially submerged off Nghệ Tĩnh Province, Vietnam. 13 of 16 crew were rescued, 3 remained on board.

=== 8 December ===
List of shipwrecks: 8 December 2022
Ship	State	Description
L'Ecume II	Jersey	The fishing vessel collided with the ferry Commodore Goodwill (Bahamas) and sank four nautical miles (7.4 km; 4.6 mi) west of Jersey, Channel Islands, while approaching Saint Helier. Two crew confirmed dead, one was reported missing.
Tsakos	Uruguay	The floating drydock sank at Montevideo with five fishing vessels in it.

=== 9 December ===
List of shipwrecks: 9 December 2022
Ship	State	Description
Unknown	China	The unmanned coastal cargo ship drifted ashore in the Gulf of Tonkin, Quảng Trị Province, Vietnam.

=== 12 December ===
List of shipwrecks: 12 December 2022
Ship	State	Description
TG-91402-TS	Vietnam	The fishing vessel was sunk in a collision with the LPG tanker Lady Roxana (Panama) in the Gulf of Tonkin, 2.5 nautical miles (4.6 km; 2.9 mi) off Vũng Tàu, Vietnam. Five of six the crew were rescued and one was reported missing.

=== 18 December ===
List of shipwrecks: 18 December 2022
Ship	State	Description
HTMS Sukhothai	Royal Thai Navy	The Ratanakosin-class corvette sprang a leak and sank in stormy waters in the Gulf of Thailand. 5 officers were reported missing, 24 dead. 76 crew were rescued, 47 by HTMS Kraburi (Royal Thai Navy), 4 by unknown tugboats, 20 by Sri Chaiya (Thailand), 2 by an unknown oil tanker, 2 by Straits Energy (Malaysia). There were 30 extra officers on board, without life jackets.
Suntudsamut 2	Thailand	The coastal container ship sank in stormy waters in the Gulf of Thailand. The crew was rescued.

=== 21 December ===
List of shipwrecks: 21 December 2022
Ship	State	Description
Hyundai Fashion	South Korea	The cargo ship rolled over and sank in the Yellow Sea due west of Gunsan, Korea. All nine crew were rescued by fishing boats and cargo ships.

=== 23 December ===
List of shipwrecks: 23 December 2022
Ship	State	Description
Steakhouse Miller and Carter Lakeside	United Kingdom	The restaurant ship sank at its moorings by Lakeside Shopping Centre, United Kingdom. No injuries and all evacuated safely.

=== 24 December ===
List of shipwrecks: 24 December 2022
Ship	State	Description
Belait Surita	Brunei	The small tanker suffered an explosion and sank off Tawi-Tawi Province, Philippines. The cargo ship Falcon Triumph (Liberia) rescued four crew from a raft, and the tanker High Adventure (Liberia) rescued six others. One crewman was reported missing.

=== 29 December ===
List of shipwrecks: 29 December 2022
Ship	State	Description
Onego Traveller	Antigua and Barbuda	The cargo ship sank in shallow waters off Hole in the Wall Lighthouse, Great Abaco, the Bahamas from water ingress, possibly from running aground. The crew was reported safe.

=== 31 December ===
List of shipwrecks: 31 December 2022
Ship	State	Description
Ronnysa and Dwi	Indonesia	The landing craft sank in Seget District waters, Sorong Regency, Southwest Papua, New Guinea. Eight people were rescued, five were reported missing.

== Unknown date ==
List of shipwrecks: Unknown date in 2022
Ship	State	Description
Donny S.	United States	The engineless out of service 45-metre (148 ft) tugboat, sometime between November 2021 and May 2022, broke free from her mooring at a dock associated with Cole and Iron Works Construction in Baileys Harbor, Wisconsin and drifted west before grounding approximately 580' feet from shore in what was then about 4feet of water. Still aground as of 27 September, 2026.
Hetman Sahaidachny	Ukrainian Navy	2022 Russian invasion of Ukraine, Battle of Mykolaiv: The Krivak III-class frigate and Ukrainian flagship was scuttled in Mykolaiv between 24 February and 3 March, to prevent its capture by the Russian Navy.
