= Texas Star (disambiguation) =

Texas Star is a Ferris wheel at Fair Park, Dallas, Texas, US.

Texas Star, Texas star, or Texas Stars may also refer to:

- Texas star (fungus)
- Texas Star (casino), a ship operating between 1977 and 2022
- Texas star, a common name for the flowering plant Sabatia campestris
- Texas star, an alternative common name for the flowering plant Lindheimera texana
- Texas Stars, an American Hockey League team
- An element on the Texan state flag, see Flag of Texas
- A classic American square dance

== See also ==
- Star of Texas, a film
- Star of Texas (award)
- Dallas Stars, an NHL ice hockey team in Dallas, Texas
- Star, Texas, an unincorporated community in Mills County, Texas
- Lone Star (disambiguation)
- Texas (disambiguation)
- Star (disambiguation)
