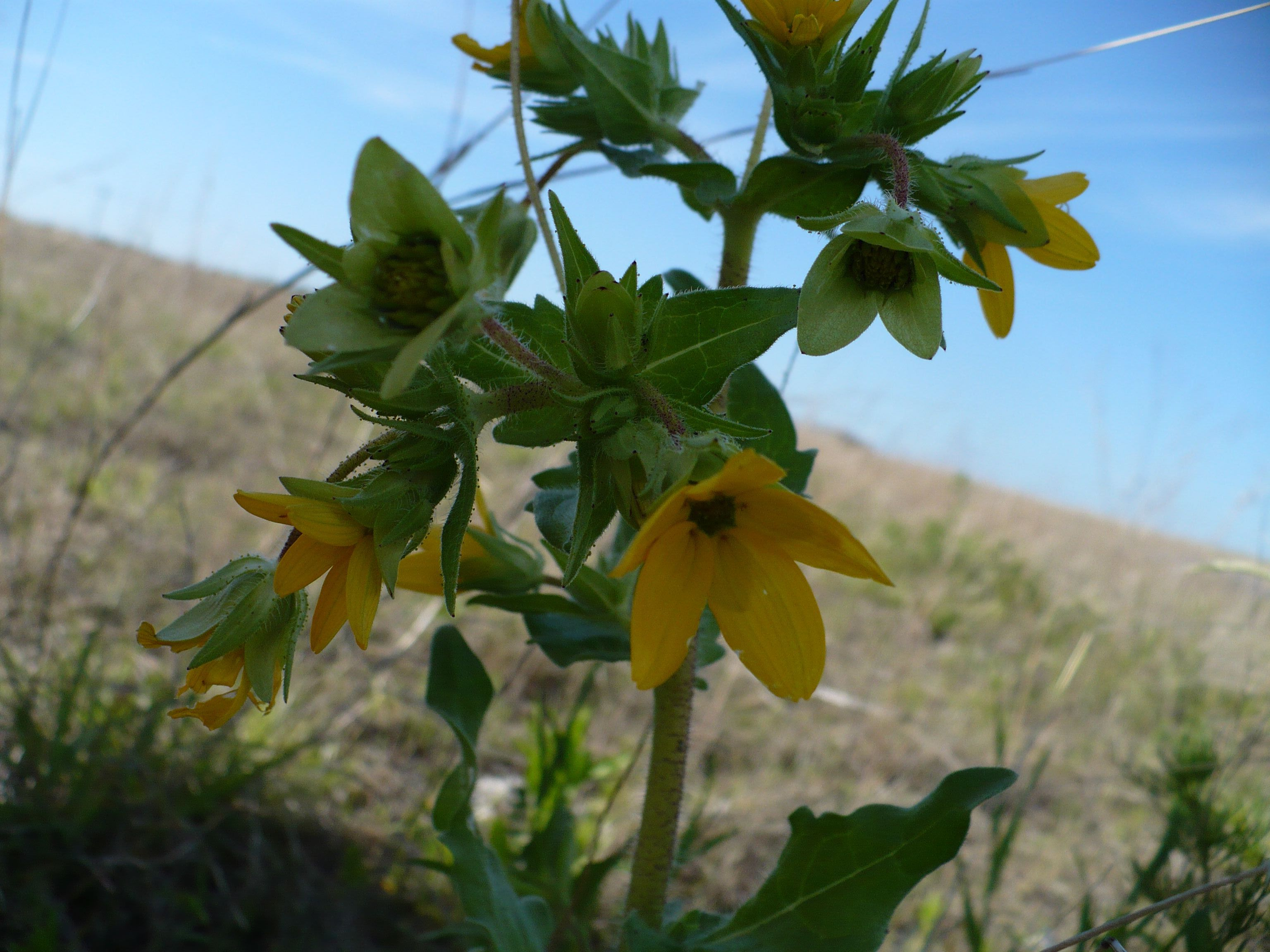
- Lindheimera texana

Scientific classification
- Kingdom: Plantae
- Clade: Tracheophytes
- Clade: Angiosperms
- Clade: Eudicots
- Clade: Asterids
- Order: Asterales
- Family: Asteraceae
- Subfamily: Asteroideae
- Tribe: Heliantheae
- Subtribe: Engelmanniinae
- Genus: Lindheimera; A.Gray & Engelm.

Type species
- Lindheimera texana A.Gray & Engelm.

= Lindheimera =

Genus of flowering plants

Lindheimera is a genus of flowering plants in the tribe Heliantheae within the family Asteraceae found in North America. The genus is named for German-American botanist Ferdinand Lindheimer, 1801–1879.

== Species ==
The following species are recognised in the genus:

- Lindheimera mexicana A.Gray - Hidalgo, México State, Puebla, Veracruz, Tlaxcala
- Lindheimera texana A.Gray & Engelm. - Texas, Oklahoma, Arkansas, Louisiana
