= MV Tanimbar Bahari =

Indonesian cargo ship

History

Indonesia
- Name: Tanimbar Bahari
- Port of registry: Surabaja, Indonesia
- Completed: 1984
- Identification: IMO number: 8403117; Call sign: YHXP
- Fate: Sank off Saumlaki on 5 January 2022

General characteristics
- Class & type: Coaster cargo ship
- Tonnage: 551 GT; 570 DWT
- Length: 47 m (154 ft 2 in)
- Beam: 10 m (32 ft 10 in)
- Crew: 15

MV Tanimbar Bahari was an Indonesian coastal cargo ship that sank in a storm off Saumlaki in January 2022.

== Description ==
Tanimbar Bahari was a small, shallow-hulled ship used to transport cargo between the Indonesian islands. It had a gross tonnage of 551 GT and a summer deadweight of 570 DWT. It measured 47 m (154 ft 2 in) long by 10 m (32 ft 10 in) abeam. It was powered by a single diesel engine and propelled by a single screw, which allowed for an average speed of 5.4 knots and a maximum speed of 7.7 knots.

== History ==
Tanimbar Bahari was built in 1984. On 5 January 2022, it was transporting cargo from Surabaya to Saumlaki. Just outside of Saumlaki harbor, the ship had to wait out a storm. Possibly due to strong waves and high winds, the ship developed a list and quickly sank. Because the ship sank almost 300 metres (980 ft) from the harbor in water 30 metres (98 ft) deep, its crew of 15 were stranded and had to jump into the water. However, all of the crew were able to swim to the shore without sustaining any injuries.
