= MV Spirit of Norfolk =

American passenger ship

History

United States
- Name: Spirit of Norfolk
- Owner: Entertainment Cruises Inc.
- Port of registry: Norfolk, Virginia
- Launched: 1992
- Identification: IMO number: 8992998; MMSI number: 367022930; Call Sign: WDC4321

General characteristics
- Type: Passenger ship
- Tonnage: 867 GT
- Length: 46.51 m (152 ft 7 in)
- Beam: 10.06 m (33 ft 0 in)

MV Spirit of Norfolk is an American passenger ship which operates as a tour boat out of Norfolk, Virginia.

== Description ==
Spirit of Norfolk is a 867 GT passenger ship. The vessel is 46.51 m (152 ft 7 in) long, with a beam of 10.06 m (33 ft 0 in) and draft of 2.1 m (6 ft 11 in). It has three decks, with the first two named after the Potomac and Delaware rivers and the third being a rooftop deck. The Potomac deck contains dining services for the ship and the Delaware deck contains a bar and dance floor. With a maximum capacity of 320 passengers, the vessel currently offers tours of the Norfolk harbor.

== History ==
=== The Spirit (1978-1981) ===
The Spirit is the first iteration of the Spirit of Norfolk, launching in 1978 as a harbor cruising ship. During this time, harbor cruising was not a popular activity in Norfolk. As a result, it was not financially viable and halted operations in 1981.

=== Spirit of Norfolk (1992-2022) ===
The second iteration, Spirit of Norfolk, was a 1,151 GT passenger ship built by Service Marine Industries in Amelia, Louisiana in 1992 as hull number 163. The vessel was 51 m (167 ft 4 in) long, with a beam of 11.6 m (38 ft 1 in) and draft of 2.1 m (6 ft 11 in). It had three decks and was capable of accommodating over 400 passengers. The Spirit of Norfolk was launched and christened in March 1992 (then called The New Spirit before its christening). It was originally owned by Spirit Cruises LLC, which merged with Premier Yachts Inc. in 2007 to become Entertainment Cruises Inc., based in Chicago, Illinois.

In 2008, the vessel underwent a $350,000 renovation. It was painted blue and white to resemble the 1978 ship and the interior was updated. That year, the vessel hosted roughly 130,000 passengers. The vessel was renovated a second time in 2016, with a cost of $1.2 million. This renovation focused on the lounge areas, interactivity, and menu overhauls.

During the COVID-19 pandemic, Spirit of Norfolk remained at anchor for several months in 2020, and its number of staff was reduced by half. The ship was able to operate again beginning in April 2021, taking on passengers at 50% capacity. By June 2022 it was owned by Hornblower Cruises & Events of San Francisco, which acquired Entertainment Cruises in 2019.

==== Fire and loss ====
On 7 June 2022, Spirit of Norfolk was conducting a harbor tour for elementary students off Naval Station Norfolk. A total of 108 people were aboard, 89 of them schoolchildren, when it caught fire in the early afternoon. The fire appeared to start in the engine room, with smoke seen coming from the stern of the ship. The crew moved all passengers to the weather deck and called for help, and the passenger ship Victory Rover pulled alongside Spirit of Norfolk, taking on its passengers. Two tugboats from Naval Station Norfolk also responded, pulling Spirit of Norfolk into the station's pier 4. Various agencies began fighting the fire on board the ship, including the Coast Guard, Norfolk Fire and Rescue, and neighboring fire stations. Efforts to contain the fire continued until 9 June, including dewatering operations to remove contaminated water aboard the ship. On 9 June, the fire was believed to be fully contained, but the vessel was declared a total loss.

By 12 June, the dewatering aboard the vessel was completed and it was declared safe to enter. The polluted water was pumped into a barge and no environmental contamination was detected. A salvage team consisting of two tugs and a Coast Guard escort successfully towed Spirit of Norfolk into a shipyard for investigation and salvage.

==== Aftermath and public hearing ====
On January 26, 2023, the United States Coast Guard and the National Transportation Safety Board began a joint public hearing into the fire and loss of the vessel. During these hearings, no exact cause of the fire was found, however it is believed that the origin of the fire was a leaky turbocharger, which ignited cardboard boxes placed directly below the engine it was installed in. During the hearing, 23 witnesses testified and 103 exhibits were created for public viewing. The hearing also revealed that the vessel did not have a fire detection system or a fire suppression system.

The joint public hearings concluded on February 2, 2023, and a report was issued on September 29, 2023. The NTSB recommended that the Coast Guard require the retrofit of fire detection and suppression systems in older vessels and that contingency plans be improved.

The wreckage was sold for $740,000 to become a part of an artificial reef off the coast of the Crestview-Fort Walton Beach-Destin metropolitan area, Florida. Scuttled off Destin, Florida in late June 2025 as an artificial reef in 128-foot (39 m) of water in the Gulf of Mexico.

=== Spirit of Mount Vernon - The Spirit - Spirit of Norfolk (from 2022) ===
On August 12, 2022, the sister ship Spirit of Mount Vernon took over tour operations after an extensive renovation. After being drydocked from January 2024 to February 2024, it was renamed The Spirit for the tour's 45th season. Later in October it was renamed once again to The Spirit of Norfolk, being rechristened on April 30, 2025, and making it the third iteration of Spirit of Norfolk.

This Spirit of Norfolk measures 867 GT and was built in 1990, also by Service Marine Industries in Amelia, Louisiana, as hull number 158. The vessel was 46.51 m (152 ft 7 in) long, with a beam of 10.06 m (33 ft 0 in) and draft of 2.1 m (6 ft 11 in).
