= MY 007 =

Superyacht

History
- Name: Amazon-A; Royal Enterprise; 007
- Port of registry: United Kingdom
- Builder: Aegean Yacht
- Completed: 2006
- Fate: Ran aground and sank off Greece, 2 September 2022

General characteristics
- Tonnage: 400 GT
- Length: 49 m (160 ft 9 in)
- Beam: 8 m (26 ft 3 in)
- Draught: 3.65 m (12 ft 0 in)
- Speed: 10 knots (19 km/h; 12 mph)
- Capacity: 10
- Crew: 5

MY 007 was a James Bond-themed superyacht that sank off the coast of Greece on 2 September 2022.

== Description ==
007 was a monohull yacht with an aluminum superstructure and three teak wood decks. Originally, the ship was 32 m (105 ft 0 in) long, but this was later expanded to 49 m (160 ft 9 in) long. It had a beam of 8 m (26 ft 3 in), a draft of 3.7 m (12 ft 2 in), and a gross tonnage of 400 GT. The ship's two diesel engines provided 1,300 horsepower, allowing for a cruising speed of 10 knots and a maximum speed of 12 knots.

== History ==
007 was completed by Aegean Yacht at Bodrum, Turkey as Amazon-A in December 2006. It was later renamed Royal Enterprise and was sold to its final owner in 2012 and renamed 007. It last underwent refurbishment in 2018 in Turkey.

On the night of 2 September 2022, the yacht experienced a GPS malfunction while off Kythnos Island, Greece. Reportedly, 007's captain and owner (an Israeli/Swiss businessman) moved closer to the shore as a result of this malfunction, steering into water less than ten meters deep. 007 ran aground on rocks, developing a list and becoming half submerged. By the time the Coast Guard arrived, the vessel was beyond rescue, but the five people on board were saved without injury. The following day, an antipollution barrier was established around the ship and an investigation was launched into the incident.
