= MV Xelo =

Fuel-laden ship

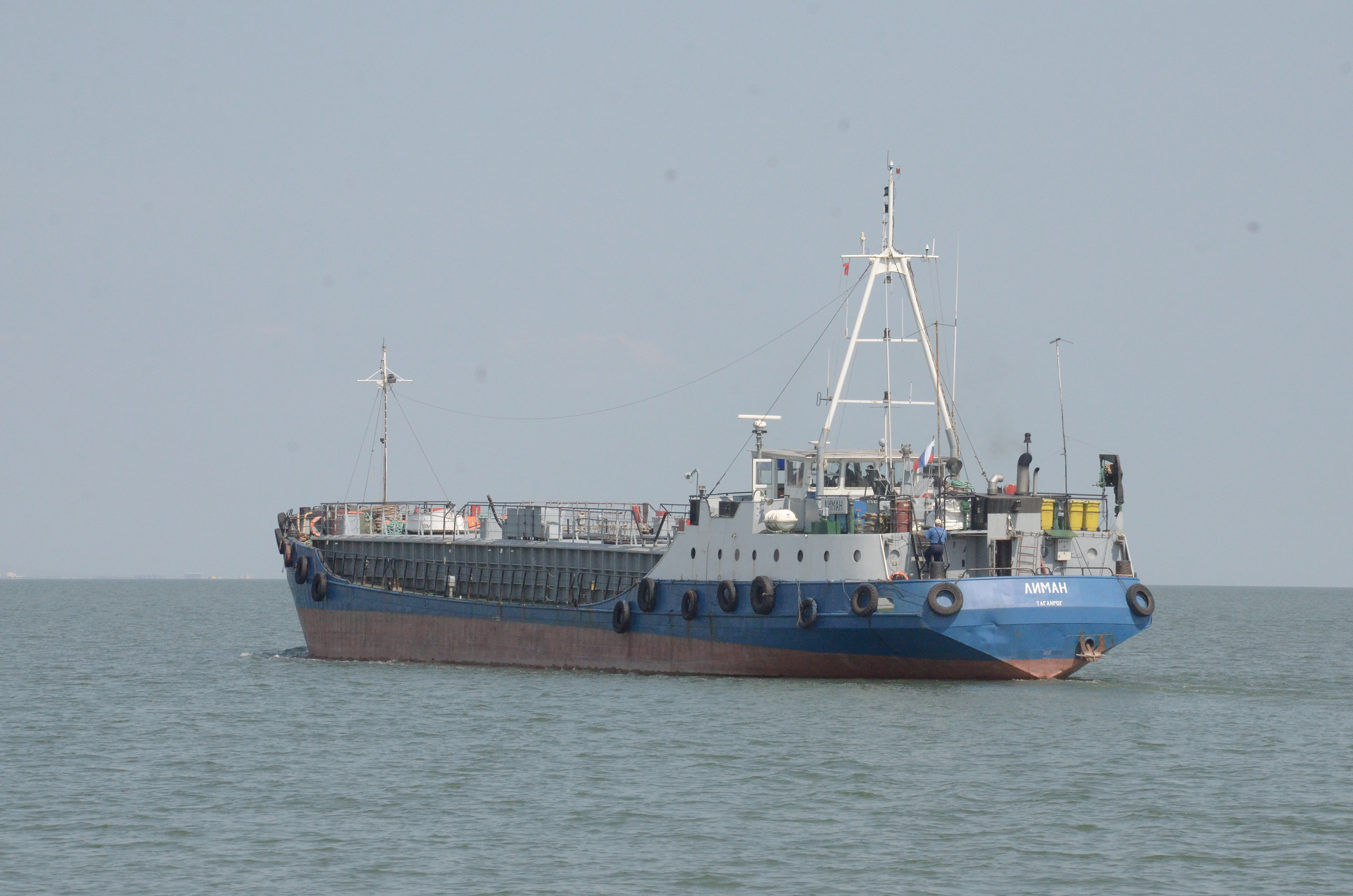
- Xelo as Liman in 2015

History
- Name: Xelo
- Port of registry: Equatorial Guinea
- Launched: 30 April 1977
- Identification: IMO number: 7618272; Callsign: 3COL
- Fate: Foundered 16 April 2022

General characteristics
- Tonnage: 721 tonnes
- Length: 60 m (196 ft 10 in)
- Beam: 10 m (32 ft 10 in)
- Draught: 3.2 m (10 ft 6 in)

Xelo was an Equatorial Guinea-flagged bunkering tanker which sank on 16 April 2022.

== Sinking ==
On 16 April 2022, Xelo was carrying up to 1000 tons of fuel from Egypt to Malta sank off the southeast coast of Tunisia. The ship suffered severe weather off the coast of Tunisia, prompting crew to ask Tunisian authorities for permission to enter its territorial waters. The ship was allowed to enter, but water began to enter the ship in the Gulf of Qabas and its engine room was filled with water and the ship began to sink rapidly. Realizing the danger, the Tunisian Coast Guard escorted the crew in another boat to safety.
