= Environment Protection Authority (Tasmania) =

Environmental regulator of Tasmania, Australia

Agency overview
- Formed: 1 December 2021
- Jurisdiction: Tasmania, Australia
- Headquarters: 40 Elizabeth Street; Hobart, TAS 7000
- Parent agency: Tasmanian Government
- Website: www.epa.tas.gov.au

The Tasmanian Environmental Protection Authority (referred to as the EPA, stylised as EPA Tasmania) is an independent regulatory body of the Tasmanian Government responsible for the environmental protection and management in the state of Tasmania, Australia. The EPA's primary role is to independently monitor, regulate, and enforce environmental laws and regulations to ensure the protection of Tasmania's natural resources and ecosystems.

The EPA was founded as an autonomous statutory body in accordance with the Environmental Management and Pollution Control Act 1994 (EMPCA), functioning as an essential component of Tasmania's Resource Management and Planning System (Tasmania). In September 2021, it was announced that the EPA would separate from the Department of Primary Industries, Water and Environment (Tasmania) into a standalone independent government body.

== Agency responsibilities ==
The EPA holds significant importance due to its independent reporting, safeguarding and managing Tasmania's natural environment.

=== Environmental regulation ===
The EPA develops and enforces environmental regulations and standards to address various aspects of environmental protection, including air and water quality, waste management, pollution control, and biodiversity conservation.

=== Environmental monitoring ===
The agency monitors environmental conditions and assesses the impact of human activities on the environment. This involves conducting regular surveys, collecting data, and analyzing information to track changes in environmental quality and identify potential issues.

==== Robbins Island wind farm ====
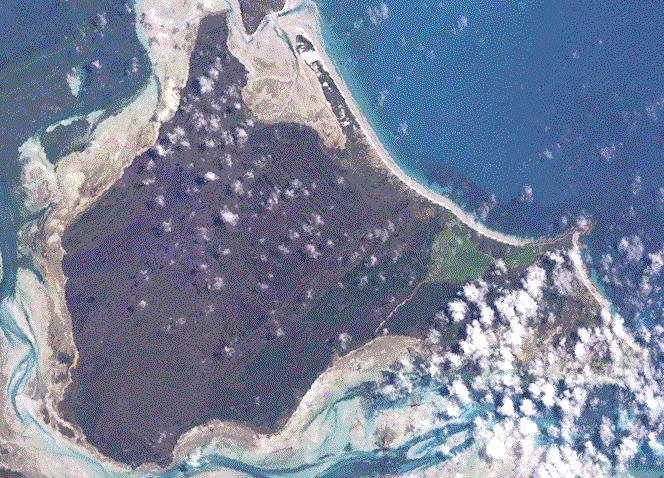
Robbins Island, as photographed by NASA in 1999

In 2023, renewables developer ACEN Australia was forced to revise its plans for a $1.6B wind farm on Robbins Island in Tasmania's north-west following a condition imposed by the EPA which required a five-month annual shutdown due to the migration of the critically endangered orange-bellied parrot. The proposed 900-megawatt (1,200,000 hp) Robbins Island wind farm's turbine count was reduced from 122 to 100, with maximum height lowered from 270 metres (890 ft) to 212 metres (696 ft). The wind farm is vital for Tasmania's 200% renewable energy goal by 2040 and aligns with national emission reduction targets. The project, adjacent to Jim's Plain Renewable Energy Park, intends to span Robbins Island's western section with potential battery storage. While approved by the Circular Head Council, State and Federal Governments, the wind farm proposal has faced opposition by environmental groups, including the Bob Brown Foundation over ecological concerns.

=== Licensing and permits ===
The EPA issues permits and licenses for various activities that have the potential to impact the environment. This includes industries, businesses, and other entities that may discharge pollutants into the air or water, generate waste, or engage in activities that could harm the ecosystem.

=== Compliance and enforcement ===
The EPA ensures that individuals and organizations adhere to environmental laws and regulations. It conducts inspections, investigates complaints, and takes enforcement actions when violations are identified. These actions can range from fines and penalties to legal action, depending on the severity of the violation.

==== Illegal dumping of industrial waste ====
In 2023, the EPA began investigating the illegal disposal of controlled waste at multiple sites in the state's north and north-west. The waste likely stems from scrap metal shredding and processing, containing plastics, foam, rubber, fabrics, wood fibers, soil, metals, hydrocarbons, and chemicals. Hundreds of tonnes of this material may have been misrepresented as inert or general waste. Suspected sites include private and municipal landfills, as well as privately owned land. Chemical analysis of samples reveals cadmium, copper, zinc, lead, nickel, hydrocarbons, and other contaminants, classifying it as controlled waste. Despite not being soil, the EPA rates it as level 4 contaminated soil due to high contamination. Safe disposal in Tasmania is limited to the Copping C-Cell facility, with approved transporters. The EPA is notifying relevant parties about environmental risks and checking for additional waste sites. Greens MP Rosalie Woodruff urged the State Government to impose more stringent permit conditions, ensuring complete adherence and strict enforcement of any violations.

=== Public awareness and education ===
The EPA plays a role in raising public awareness about environmental issues and promoting sustainable practices. It may engage in educational campaigns, provide resources for individuals and communities, and collaborate with stakeholders to foster environmental stewardship.

=== Policy development ===
The agency may contribute to the development of environmental policies and strategies at the state and local levels. This could involve participating in discussions, providing expert advice, and offering recommendations to government bodies.

== See also ==
- List of Tasmanian government agencies
