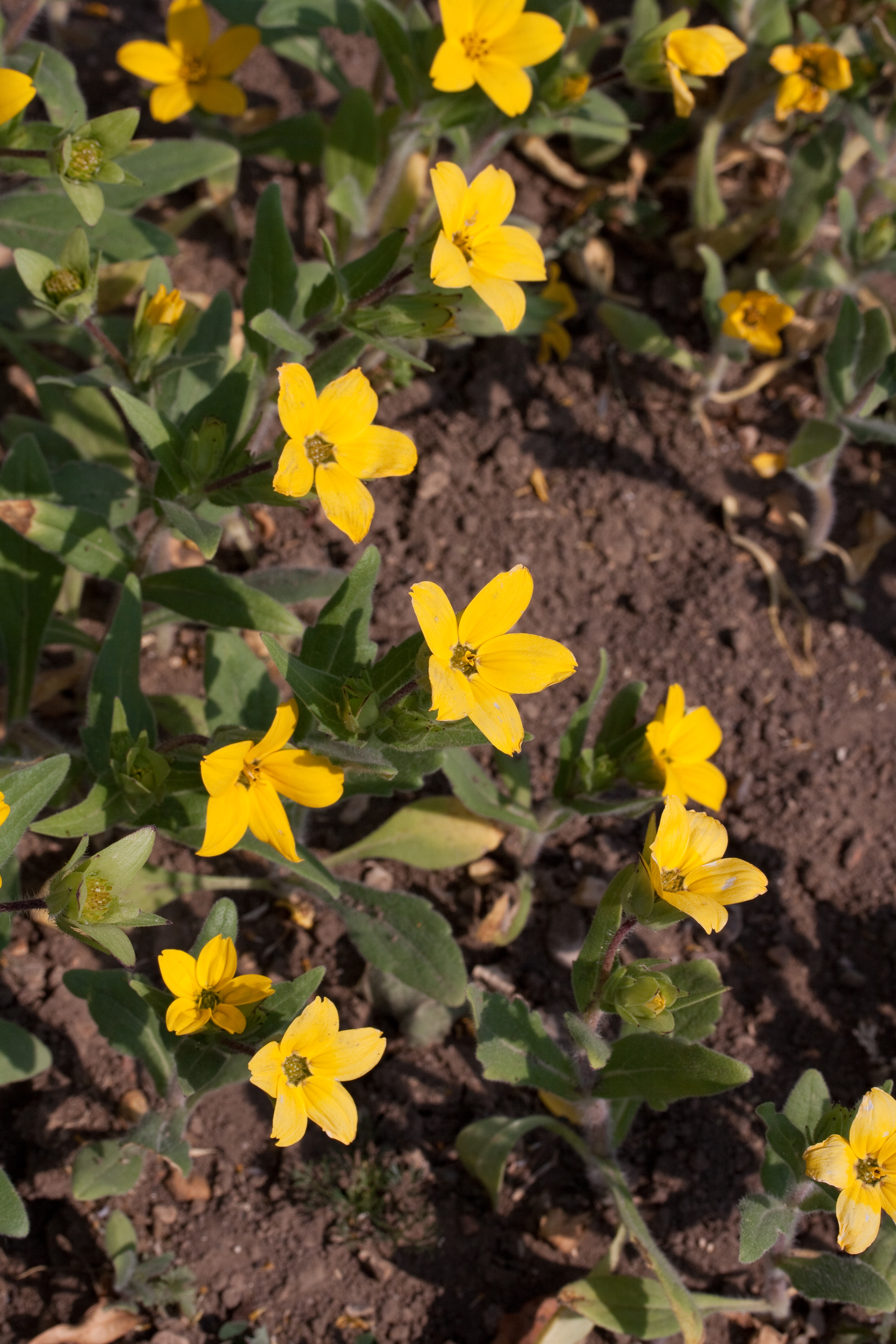

Scientific classification
- Kingdom: Plantae
- Clade: Tracheophytes
- Clade: Angiosperms
- Clade: Eudicots
- Clade: Asterids
- Order: Asterales
- Family: Asteraceae
- Genus: Lindheimera
- Species: L. texana

Binomial name
- Lindheimera texana A.Gray & Engelm., 1847

= Lindheimera texana =

Species of flowering plant

Lindheimera texana, commonly known as Texas yellow star, is a species of flowering plant in the tribe Heliantheae within the family Asteraceae. It is found in the south-western United States (Oklahoma and Texas) and northern Mexico (Coahuila). Other common names include star daisy, Texas star and Lindheimer daisy,

== Description ==
Lindheimera texana is a plant that is 6 to 24 inches (15 to 61 cm) tall. Leaves on the lower half on the plant are alternate and coarsely toothed, but on the upper half are opposite and smooth on the edges. Each flower head has five bright yellow ray flowers, each with two prominent veins and indented at the tip. The flowers will be at least 1–1.25 inches (2.5–3.2 cm) in diameter. The flowers will grow within 2 inches (5.1 cm) of each other.
