= Texas Star (casino) =

Gambling ship

Texas Star, formerly known as the Stardancer V, the Europa Star, the Walter M, and originally the Southern Prince, was a 167-foot (51 m) ship that was put to various uses between 1977 and 2022. Most notably, it was a gambling ship which operated from various ports in the United States between 1987 and 2004. In 2022, it was deliberately sunk off the coast of Delaware to build up the artificial Redbird Reef.

== Early history ==
The Southern Prince was built at the Halter Marine shipyard in Lockport, Louisiana, in 1977. It was built for Mid South Marine, Inc., of Morgan City, as a platform supply vessel to service oil rigs in the Gulf of Mexico.

Along with another Gulf supply vessel, the Chuck Briley, the Southern Prince was purchased in July 1986 by a New Jersey passenger ferry company, Direct Line Commuter Service. The Southern Prince was rechristened the Walter M, while her sister ship became the Stanis M, named for the company's owners, Walter and Stanis Mihm. After being converted for passenger service, the Walter M's first voyage on February 14, 1987, hosted the wedding of the Mihms' daughter Janet. The ship entered regular passenger service the following month, traveling between various ports in New Jersey and Pier 11/Wall Street in Manhattan.

The ship was the first to be placed on one of Direct Line's new routes, from Keansburg Amusement Park to Manhattan, beginning July 16, 1987. The Keansburg–Manhattan route was discontinued less than two months later on September 11 due to low ridership.

== Casino ==
=== Biloxi, Mississippi ===
Europa Cruise Lines announced in June 1987 that it intended to begin operating a gambling ship out of the port of Biloxi, Mississippi, which would be registered in Panama. While all forms of gambling other than charity events were then illegal in the state of Mississippi, the state attorney general Edwin L. Pittman confirmed that the state would have no jurisdiction over foreign-flagged ships once they passed beyond the three-mile limit away from shore. Europa then purchased the Walter M and the Stanis M, rechristening them the Europa Star and the Europa Sun, respectively. The Europa Star was sent to Biloxi, while the Europa Sun began a similar venture based in Pensacola, Florida.

The Europa Star's maiden voyage was originally scheduled for April 1, 1988, but it was moved up to December 1987. The ship was intended to make trips out to the Mississippi Sound, more than three miles from any point of land, but in between the Mississippi–Alabama barrier islands and the mainland. However, the sheriff of Harrison County, Larkin I. Smith, said he would not allow gambling to take place in the Sound, declaring the entire area between the mainland and the barrier islands to be inland waters of Mississippi. On December 14, 1987, five days before the Europa Star was scheduled to begin its cruises, Europa's lawyers discovered a unanimous decision by the U.S. Supreme Court from 1985, United States v. Louisiana (470 U.S. 93), which ruled that the Sound was indeed inland waters of Mississippi. In order to offer legal gambling, the Europa Star would therefore have to sail outside the Sound, three miles past Ship Island, a journey which would take two hours each way instead of the expected 30 minutes.

Europa Cruise Lines argued that the Supreme Court decision applied only to mineral rights. The company was granted a temporary injunction in its case against the sheriff by a local circuit judge on December 18, the day before the planned maiden voyage, allowing the gambling ship to operate in the Sound for 10 days while the company pursued its legal options. The ship's first gambling cruise took place without incident in the Sound on the evening of December 19.

The case over the legality of the Europa Star's operations went to the Supreme Court of Mississippi, with the injunction extended twice to allow the ship to continue cruising until a decision was rendered. In the meantime, state representative Glenn Endris introduced a bill to legalize gambling in the Sound; this measure passed the Mississippi House of Representatives in February 1988, but failed in the Senate Finance Committee in March. A Biloxi city referendum on March 30 saw voters overwhelmingly approve the legalization of gambling in the Sound, but this had no legal force.

On October 7, 1988, the United States Customs Service ruled that the Europa Star was in violation of the Passenger Vessel Services Act of 1886, which forbids foreign-flagged ships from transporting passengers through the internal waters of the United States (regardless of whether they were also the internal waters of Mississippi) without transiting international waters at any point during the voyage. While unrelated to the state supreme court case, the decision also required the Europa Star to travel out of the Sound and past Ship Island, beginning October 12. This extended each cruise from six hours to eight.

Separately, the state supreme court returned its case back to the circuit court level. The circuit judge ruled on November 8 that the Sound was part of Mississippi's internal waters, forbidding gambling from taking place except when the ship was more than three miles beyond Ship Island on its extended route. Two days later, Europa Cruise Lines announced it would move the Europa Star from Biloxi to St. Petersburg, Florida, where her sister ship, the Europa Sun, had been operating since October. The Europa Star left Biloxi on November 15 for dry dock maintenance in Pensacola, Florida; it was intended to return for a final series of cruises in December, but never came back to Biloxi. Company officials said they would like to return to Biloxi if gambling was legalized in the Sound, but that the longer cruises had made the ship unprofitable.

=== Florida ===
The Europa Star joined the Europa Sun at its new home port, John's Pass Village in Madeira Beach, Florida. As before, the ship was required to pass out of territorial waters before gambling could take place, but the necessary distance to travel was reduced. Its first gambling cruise from John's Pass took place on the evening of February 16, 1989. On March 11, the Europa Star struck a smaller commercial fishing boat, the Atlantis, while leaving its dock in John's Pass.

The Europa Star adopted a seasonal schedule, moving to Mayport, Florida, near Jacksonville, and beginning cruises there on May 20, 1989. From then on, the ship would operate from Mayport between May and September, then return to Madeira Beach between October and April. It relocated to Fort Myers Beach starting November 21, 1991.

In August 2000, Europa Cruises announced it would sell its ships to focus solely on its new project, developing a riverboat casino in Diamondhead, Mississippi. The buyer was Stardancer Casino Cruises, Inc., which continued to operate the ship in Florida under the name Stardancer V. On January 14, 2003, the Stardancer V and all other Stardancer properties were seized by federal agents, as part of an investigation into allegations that the company had received millions of dollars embezzled from a recently collapsed Ohio bank. The Stardancer V was auctioned off by the U.S. Treasury Department, along with the company's five other cruise ships, on May 9, 2003.

=== Savannah, Georgia ===
The ship was acquired by Dynamic Gaming Solutions, which renamed it the Millionaire's Casino and brought it to Savannah, Georgia, where it operated from a dock at the Hyatt Regency hotel. Its first voyage out of Savannah on August 27, 2004, was cut short after a piece of insulation began smoldering; the ship's electrical generator was shut down in the belief that it could be the beginnings of an electrical fire, but there was no damage beyond clouds of smoke being created. The ship failed a U.S. Coast Guard inspection on October 1, as its chief engineer lacked the proper certification for that role from the government of Panama, where the ship was registered. Cruises were stopped for four days, resuming on October 5 when another person was brought into the chief engineer position. On December 4, one of the ship's engines failed, forcing the company to hire a tugboat to tow the ship back to shore.

After the December incident, the Millionaire's Casino was taken out of service so its engines could be replaced. The ship never resumed operations in Savannah. On May 20, 2005, shortly after a rival gambling ship operator announced plans to bring the Diamond Lady to Savannah, the inoperative ship was seen at the Hyatt dock one last time, the name on its hull having already been changed without announcement from the Millionaire's Casino to the Texas Star. By May 23, the ship had left Savannah, and its operators could not be reached by reporters.

=== Freeport, Texas ===
In June 2005, a new company, Texas Star Casino Boats, was formed to operate the Texas Star out of a dock in Freeport, Texas. The ship remained moored near the Surfside Bridge in Freeport while the ship was renovated and a landside bingo hall was constructed to serve as its port. On April 7, 2006, before it could begin offering passenger cruises in Freeport, the Texas Star was seized by U.S. Marshals, after the ship's owners failed to pay one of its contractors for electrical work during the renovation. The ship was returned to Texas Star Casino Boats on May 5, after the contractor received a letter of credit.

Due to continued problems with the company paying its debts, the Freeport City Council denied the ship a permit to load passengers in February 2007. The dock building opened later that year as C.J.'s Waterway Cantina and Amusements, offering arcade games with prizes instead of cash gambling, while the ship remained unused. The company received a loading permit in 2008, but by that time, the Great Recession was underway and the owners preferred to wait for better economic conditions before beginning operation of the ship.

In 2011, the Texas Star was sold to the X-Change Corporation, which announced plans to move it to Galveston, Texas.

== Post-casino history ==
The Texas Star never operated as a casino again and was eventually converted for use in the commercial gathering and processing of scallops. On June 29, 2022, the disused ship was deliberately sunk by the Delaware Department of Natural Resources and Environmental Control at a point 16.5 miles east of the Delaware coast. This was part of the construction of the artificial Redbird Reef, designed as a habitat for oceanic fish and a destination for recreational fishers and scuba divers.

== See also ==
- Video of the Texas Star being scuttled on YouTube
