= Allegorical sculpture =

Personification of abstract ideas

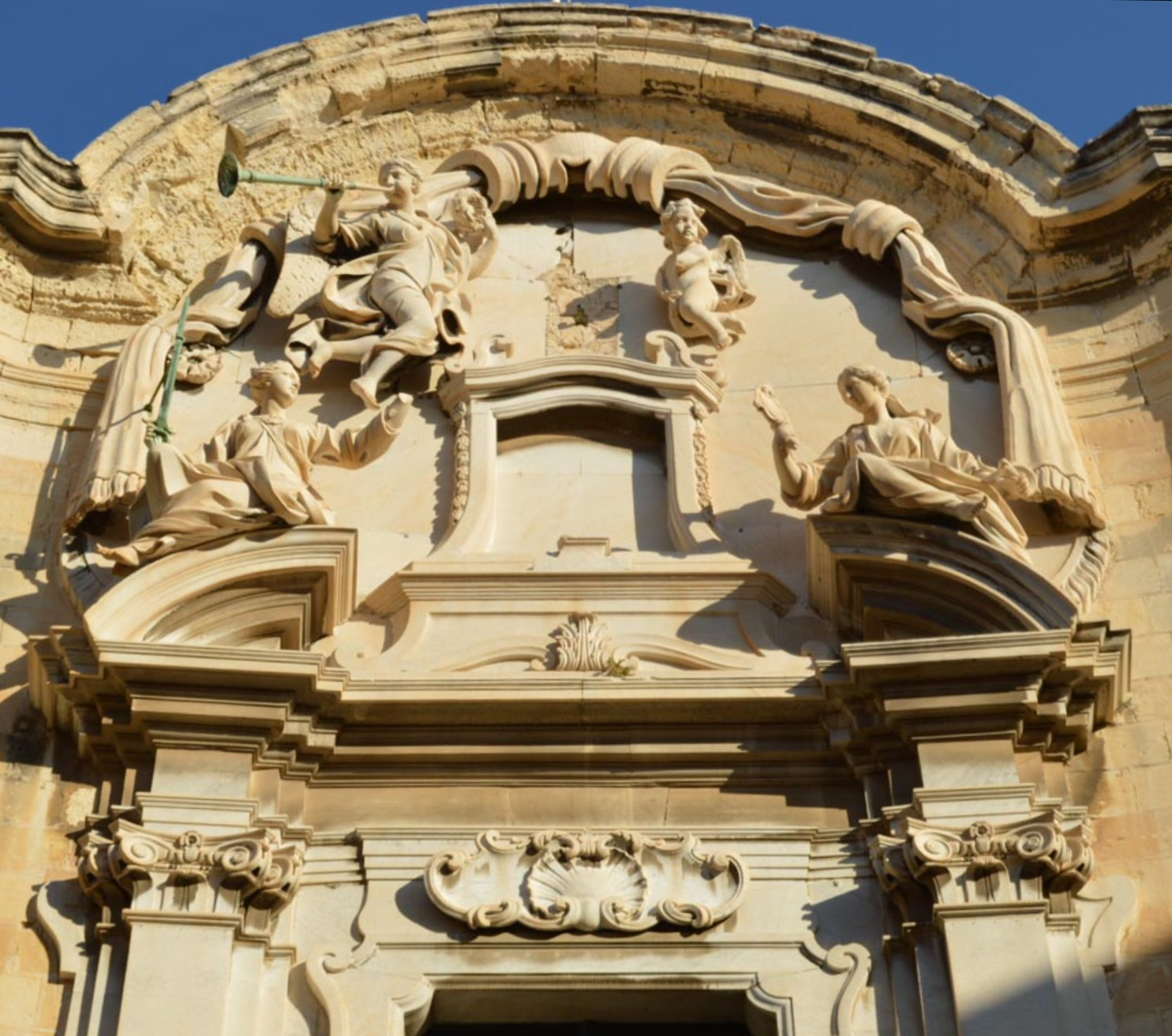
Baroque allegorical figures of Lady Justice, Prudence, fame and glory, on the façade of the 17th century Castellania, in Valletta

Allegorical sculpture are sculptures of personifications of abstract ideas, as in allegory. Common in the western world, for example, are statues of Lady Justice representing justice, traditionally holding scales and a sword, and the statues of Prudence, representing Truth by holding a mirror and squeezing a serpent.

This approach uses the human form and its posture, gesture, clothing and props to wordlessly convey social values and themes. It may be seen in funerary art as early as 1580. They were used on Renaissance monuments when patron saints became unacceptable. Particularly popular were the four cardinal virtues and the three Christian virtues, but others such as fame, victory, hope, and time are also represented. The use of allegorical sculpture was fully developed under the École des Beaux-Arts. It is sometimes associated with Victorian art, and is commonly found in works dating from around 1900.

== Notable allegorical sculptures ==
- The four cardinal virtues, by Maximilian Colt, on the monument to Robert Cecil, 1st Earl of Salisbury in Bishop's Hatfield Church in the English county of Hertfordshire, before 1641.
- Pinto's Allegories of Justice and Truth by architect Giuseppe Bonici and mason Giovanni Puglisi, 1758.
- The figures of the four continents and four arts and sciences surrounding the Albert Memorial in Kensington Gardens, 1872.
- The Statue of Liberty (Liberty Enlightening the World), 1886.
- Passing of the Buffalo by Cyrus Dallin in Muncie, Indiana, 1929.
- Figures of War and Peace located at the Millennium Monument at Heroes' Square Hősök tere, Budapest, Hungary, ca. 1900
- In Pan-American Exposition of 1901 in Buffalo, New York had an extensive scheme of allegorical sculpture programmed by Karl Bitter.
- Statue of Justice on the Old Bailey in London ca. 1902
- Four statues, Industry, Science, Agriculture, and Literature, by J. Massey Rhind at the Birch Bayh Federal Building and United States Courthouse, Indianapolis, Indiana, 1905.
- The allegorical group on top of Grand Central Terminal in Manhattan, created by the French sculptor Jules-Felix Coutan in 1912, represents the Roman gods, Hercules (physical energy), Mercury (commerce) and Minerva (wisdom), and collectively represents 'Transportation'.
- The Memory Statue is the centerpiece of the Sherborn War Memorial in Sherborn, Massachusetts by Cyrus Dallin, 1924.
- Melancholy and Raving Madness statues by Caius Gabriel Cibber. Made to decorate the entrance gate of 17th century Bethlem Hospital and now on display at the Bethlem Museum of the Mind.
