= Highland Hose House =

- U.S. National Register of Historic Places
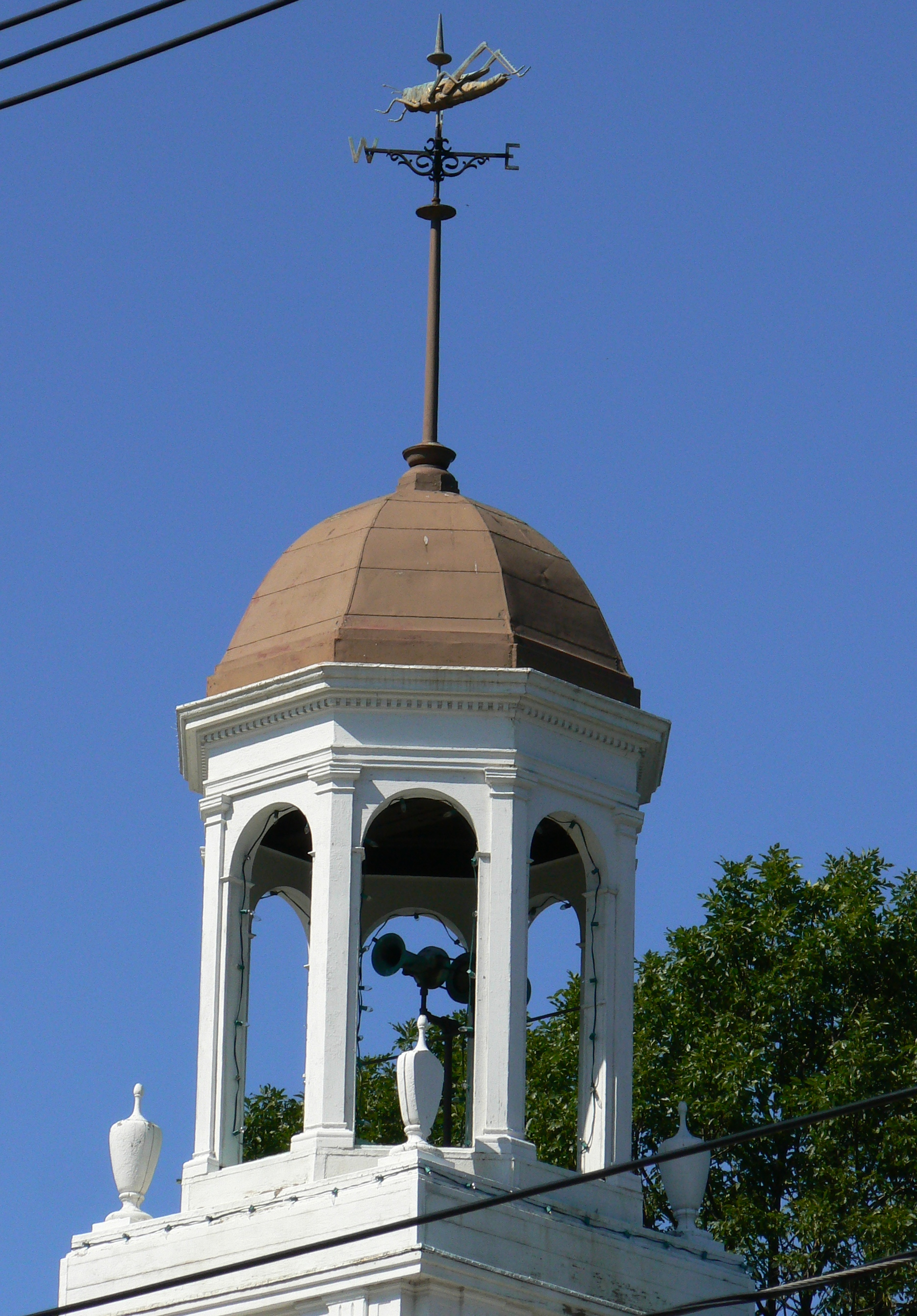
- A 2008 photograph of the cupola and grasshopper-shaped weather vane

- Location within Massachusetts Location within the United States
- Location: Arlington, Massachusetts
- Coordinates: 42°25′11″N 71°10′8″W
- Built: 1928
- Architect: Robinson, George Ernest
- Architectural style: Colonial Revival, Other
- MPS: Arlington MRA
- NRHP reference No.: 85001034
- Added to NRHP: April 18, 1985

The Highland Hose House is a historic fire station at 1007 Massachusetts Avenue in Arlington, Massachusetts. The two story brick building was built in 1928 to a design by George Ernest Robinson. His Georgian Revival design emulates features found in Boston townhouses of the late 18th and early 19th centuries, and its cupola and grasshopper weathervane resemble that of Faneuil Hall. The station includes a bronze relief of former Chief Charles Goff, executed by noted Arlington resident Cyrus Dallin.

The building was listed on the National Register of Historic Places in 1985.

== See also ==
- National Register of Historic Places listings in Arlington, Massachusetts
