= The Family (Teneau) =

- Artist: Peter Teneau
- Year: 1985
- Location: Corvallis, Oregon, United States; 44.5577°N 123.2907°W

The Family is an outdoor 1985 sculpture by Peter Teneau, installed on the Oregon State University campus in Corvallis, Oregon, United States. The painted aluminum and granite sculpture measures approximately 10 feet (3.0 m) x 6 feet (1.8 m) x 14 feet (4.3 m), 4 inches (10 cm). The Smithsonian Institution, which surveyed the work as part of its "Save Outdoor Sculpture!" program in 1993, categorizes The Family as allegorical (representing life and family) and geometric.
