= List of sculptures by Cyrus Dallin in Massachusetts =

This is a list of free-standing sculptures by Cyrus Dallin in Massachusetts. A collection of his sculpture and painting can also be seen at the Cyrus Dallin Art Museum in Arlington, Massachusetts. Additional works can be found at the Springville Museum of Art in Springville, Utah.

This list contains sculptures in spaces that might be accessed by a member of the public. Some of them may require requesting access. There may be additional sculptures in the public domain and as they are identified, they will be added to this list.

Image	Sculpture	Location	Material
	Equestrian statue of Paul Revere	Paul Revere Mall 193 Salem Street Boston, Mass.	bronze
	Statue of Anne Hutchinson	Massachusetts State House Grounds 24 Beacon Street Boston, Mass.	bronze
	Massasoit	35 Carver Street Plymouth, Mass.	bronze
The sculpture also has been referred to as the Storrow Memorial after the prominent philanthropic couple who commissioned it, donated it, and are interred nearby.	Boy and His Dog Sculpture	Lexington Road Cemetery Lexington Road Lincoln, Mass.	bronze
Sculpture of a Native American pausing for a drink of water	Menotomy Hunter	700 Massachusetts Ave. Arlington, Mass.	bronze
Oliver Wendell Homes bronze bust by Cyrus Dallin	Oliver Wendell Holmes bust	Cyrus Dallin Art Museum 611 Massachusetts Avenue Arlington, Mass. Sherborn Library 4 Sanger Street Sherborn, Mass.	bronze
Robbins Memorial Flagstaff in Arlington, Massachusetts- base with Sculptures Robbins Memorial Flagstaff in Arlington, Massachusetts- Figure of Native American woman with child Robbins Memorial Flagstaff in Arlington, Massachusetts, base figure of woman reading with child Robbins Memorial Flagstaff in Arlington, Massachusetts, base figure of pioneer man with rifle Robbins Memorial Flagstaff in Arlington, Massachusetts	Robbins Memorial Flagstaff	Massachusetts Avenue Arlington, Mass.	bronze with gold leaf
	Agriculture Finial Robbins Memorial Flagstaff	Arlington, Mass.	bronze
Scanlan Memorial Bronze Plaque by Cyrus Dallin 1922	Scanlan Memorial honoring Mary F. Scanlan	34 Winter Street Arlington, Mass.	bronze mounted on granite
	My Boys (sculpture)	Robbins Library 700 Massachusetts Avenue Arlington, Mass.	plaster
	Angel Moroni (Note, the Belmont installation is a copy of Dallin's original atop the Salt Lake Temple in Salt Lake City, Utah)	Boston Temple 100 Hinckley Way Belmont, Mass	
	Memory Statue	2 North Maine Street Sherborn, Mass.	bronze
Please see the plaques Departure of the Troops and Return of the Troops	Woburn Memorial	Woodbrook Cemetery 100 Salem Street Woburn, Mass.	bronze
	Departure of the Troops	Woodbrook Cemetery 100 Salem Street Woburn, Mass.	bronze
Dallin included a self-portrait in the lower left.	Return of the Troops	Woodbrook Cemetery 100 Salem Street Woburn, Mass.	bronze
The memorial is on a prominent corner on Chapel Road	Patrick A. Collins Memorial	Holyhood Cemetery Heath Street Brookline, Mass	bronze and Tennessee marble
	Julia Ward Howe	Museum of Fine Arts Boston, Mass.	marble
	The Praying Knight	Cambridge Rindge and Latin School 459 Broadway Cambridge, Mass.	bronze
Bronze low- relief plaque with School seal for Buckingham Brown and Nichols School	Bas Relief Plaque	Buckingham Brown and Nichols School 80 Gerrys Landing Road Cambridge, Mass.	bronze
Warren B. Potter Fund Plaque at Massachusetts College of Pharmacy	Bas Relief Plaque	Massachusetts College of Pharmacy and Health Sciences 179 Longwood Avenue Boston, Mass.	bronze
Honor Roll Plaque Newton North High School	Bas Relief Plaque	Newton North High School 457 Walnut Street Newtonville, Mass.	bronze
	Signing of the Mayflower Compact	106 Bradford Street Provincetown, Massachusetts	bronze
	Appeal to the Great Spirit	Museum of Fine Arts 465 Huntington Avenue Boston, Mass.	bronze
	Reverend Francis B. Hornbrook	Newton Free Library 330 Homer Street Newton, Mass.	marble
	Governor William Bradford	Bradford Garden 62 Water Street Plymouth, Mass.	bronze
Cushing Plaque	This 1919 tablet honors Chief Justice William Cushing	Scituate Historical Society (Original) Stockbridge Gristmill (Resin Copy) Stockbridge Road Scituate, Mass.	bronze
	This 1931 plaque honors Fire Chief Walter Horace Pierce	Fire Station 411 Massachusetts Avenue Arlington, Mass.	bronze
	This 1928 plaque honors Fire Chief Charles Gott	Fire Station 1007 Massachusetts Avenue Arlington, Mass.	bronze
	Close up of bas relief of Fire Chief Charles Gott	Fire Station 1007 Massachusetts Avenue Arlington, Mass.	bronze
	Standing Elk (1920)	Topsfield Public Library 1 Common Street Topsfield, Massachusetts	plaster
