= Alma Mater (Missouri sculpture) =

1916 sculpture by Cyrus E. Dallin

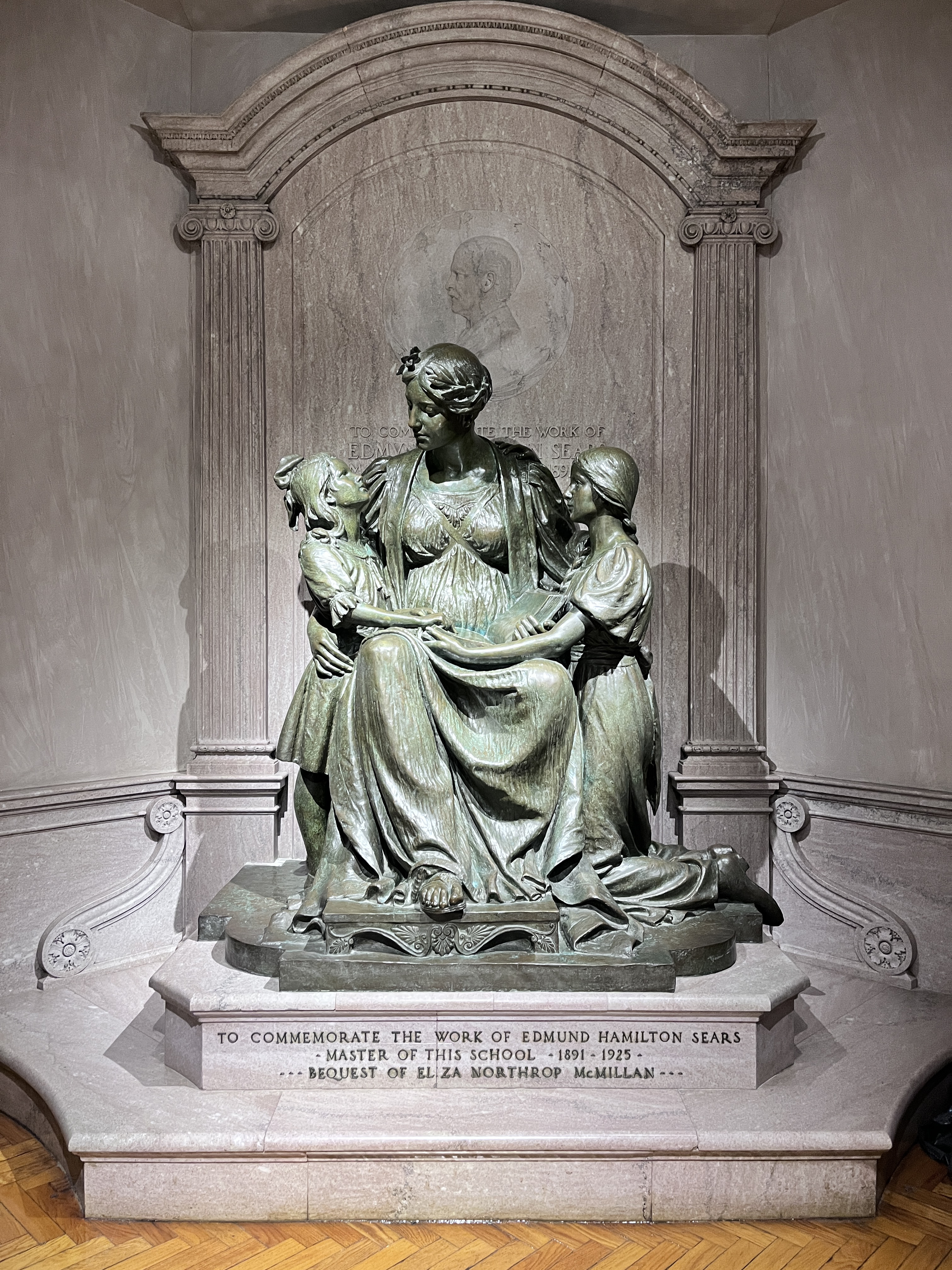
- The sculpture at Mary Institute and St. Louis Country Day School in 2022.
- Artist: Cyrus Edwin Dallin
- Year: 1916
- Type: Bronze
- Location: Ladue, Missouri, U.S.

Alma Mater (1916) is a three-figure sculpture by Cyrus E. Dallin in the Mary Institute and St. Louis Country Day School in Ladue, Missouri. One of his more prominent works of the day, it is considered to be among his finest achievements by author Kent Ahrens. The bronze sculpture and sits on a pediment of pink Tennessee marble. Its stone backing consists of two ionic pilasters that support an arching molding and frame a bas-relief profile portrait of the honoree: Edmund Sears, then the school's principal.

The sculpture contains three figures. A woman in Greek costume is seated with an open book on her lap, a mother who is an embodiment of knowledge. A kneeling female child on her left and a standing female child on her right look at her with attention. These younger figures represent students at the lower and upper schools, respectively. Ahrens writes that the sculpture may reflect the influence of Daniel Chester French and the Gallaudet Memorial. The $15,000 commission contract with Dallin was negotiated by William K. Bixby, a prominent St. Louis philanthropist, and signed on November 5, 1915. Bixby was the negotiator as Sears was uncomfortable negotiating the commission for his own honor. A bequest in the estate of Eliza Northrup MacMillian funded the project. At that time, Mary Institute was affiliated with Washington University, on whose board Bixby served.

Dallin spent time at the school making sketches and later sculpted the piece in his studio in Arlington, Massachusetts. It was first displayed at an exhibition by the Guild of Boston Artists at the Evans Wing of Boston's Museum of Fine Arts. A Boston Journal reviewer called it "one of the most striking pieces of sculpture in the exhibition". It was unveiled on November 11, 1916, with Sears in attendance.

In May 1919, a fundraiser for women's suffrage at Boston's Copley Plaza Hotel recreated prominent sculptures as tableaux vivant, including works from ancient Greece, Roman civilization, and later periods. Three of Dallin's works were included: Alma Mater and sculptures of Sacajawea and Anne Hutchinson and her granddaughter.

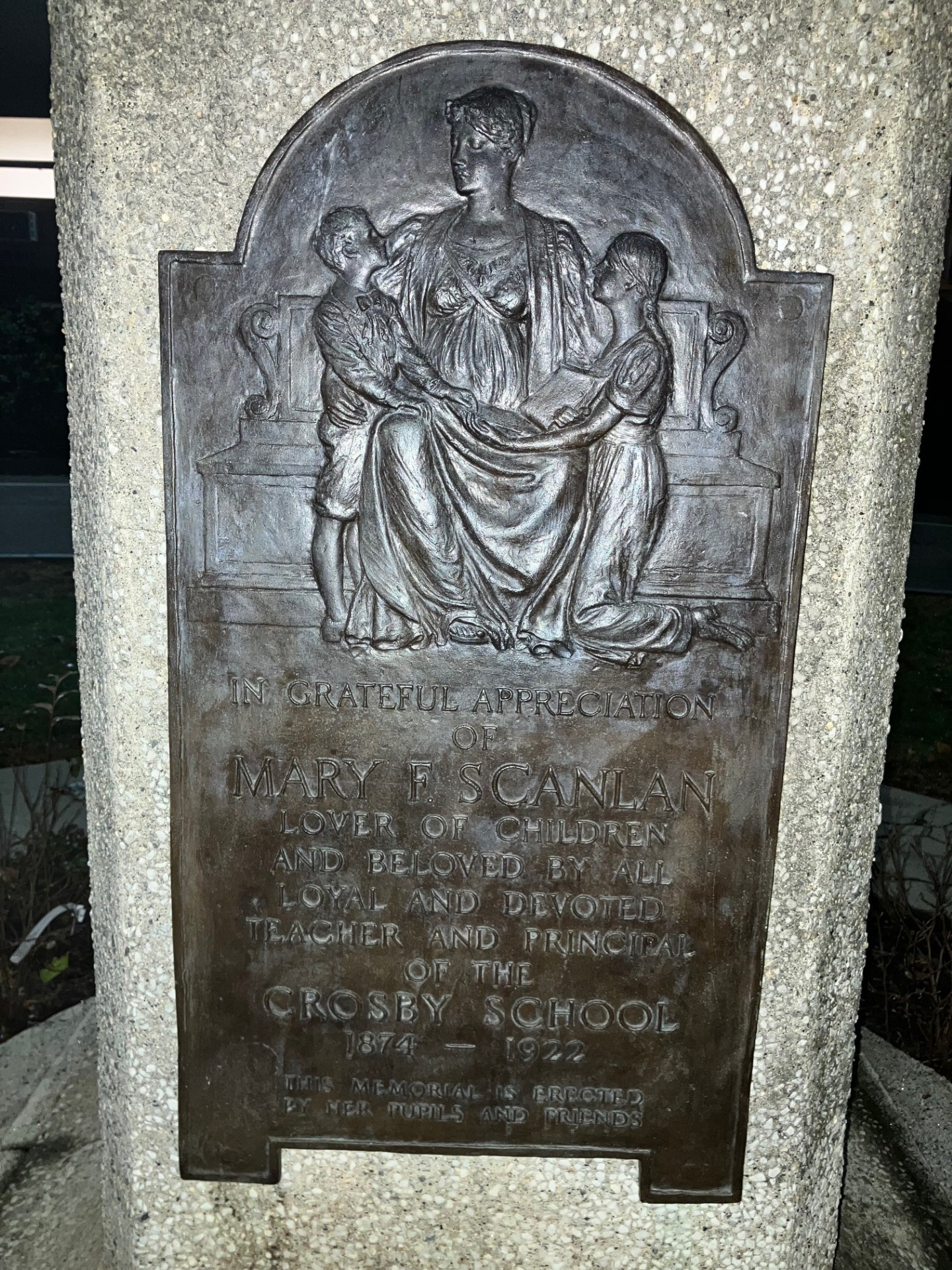
Scanlan Memorial Bronze Plaque by Cyrus Dallin 1922

In 1923, Dallin produced a similar image as a bas-relief plaque for the Scanlan Memorial at Crosby School (today, Lesley Ellis School) at 34 Winter Street in Arlington. He added a bench and substituted a standing boy for the girl on the left. The plaque honors Mary F. Scanlan, a deceased teacher and principal for 48 years.
