= Statue of Winfield Scott Hancock =

Sculpture by Cyrus E. Dallin

Coordinates: 39°48′27.3″N 77°14′6.6″W

General Winfield Scott Hancock
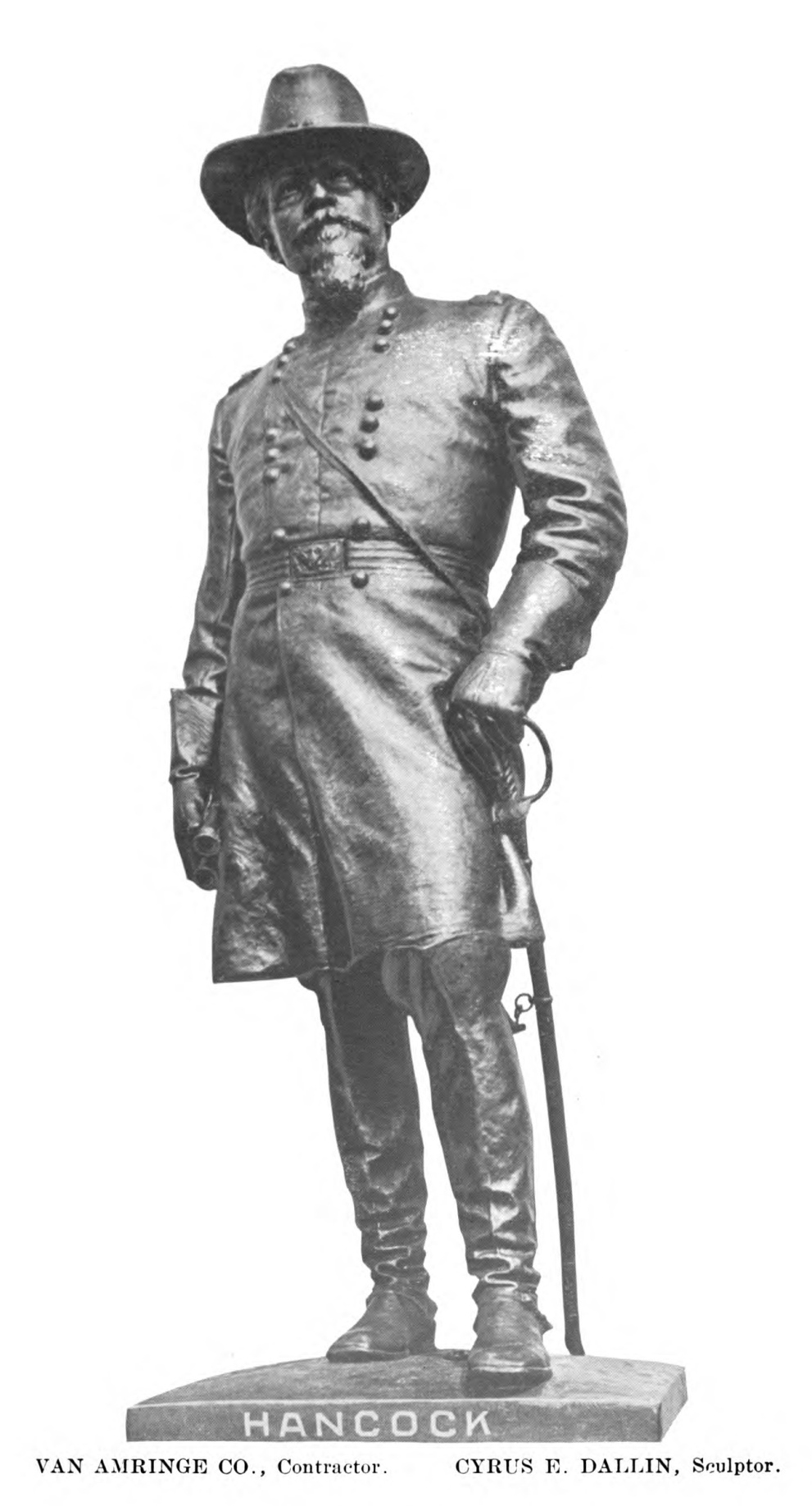
- Artist: Cyrus Edwin Dallin
- Year: 1913
- Location: Gettysburg, Pennsylvania, United States

General Winfield Scott Hancock (1913) is a sculpture by Cyrus E. Dallin on the east side of the Pennsylvania State Memorial in Gettysburg, Pennsylvania. Winfield Scott Hancock, a Union Army officer in the U.S. Civil War, is one of eight military figures depicted on the monument.

The bronze sculpture measures eight feet in height. It shows Hancock standing and dressed in his military regalia, holding a sword in his left hand. It was cast by Gorham Manufacturing Company of Providence, Rhode Island, installed in April 1913, and formally dedicated on July 4, 1913.
