= Signing of the Mayflower Compact =

Sculpture in Provincetown, Massachusetts

- The bas relief in its stone frame at the base of the Pilgrim Monument in Provincetown
- Artist: Cyrus Edwin Dallin
- Year: 1922
- Type: Bronze
- Location: Provincetown, Massachusetts

Signing of the Mayflower Compact (1922) is a fifteen-figure, bas-relief sculpture by Cyrus E. Dallin located at the base of Monument Hill below the Pilgrim Monument in Provincetown, Massachusetts. The sculpture is one of three major commissions he received as part of the Pilgrim Tercentenary in 1920. The other two were the statue of Massasoit in Plymouth, Massachusetts and the Pilgrim half dollar, which featured renditions of a pilgrim and the Mayflower under sail.

The relief sculpture is made of cast bronze and embedded in a substantial Rockport granite exedra with seating on either side. Dallin visited the site on May 6, 1922.

The bronze plaque measures 9 by 16 feet and contains ten men, three women and two children gathered around a sea chest on which Governor William Bradford is signing the precedent making document. The setting is the beamed interior of a wooden ship lit by a lantern overhead. Governor Bradford is signing the document with a quill pen with Myles Standish clad in armor dress standing immediately to his right and Elder Brewster nearby.

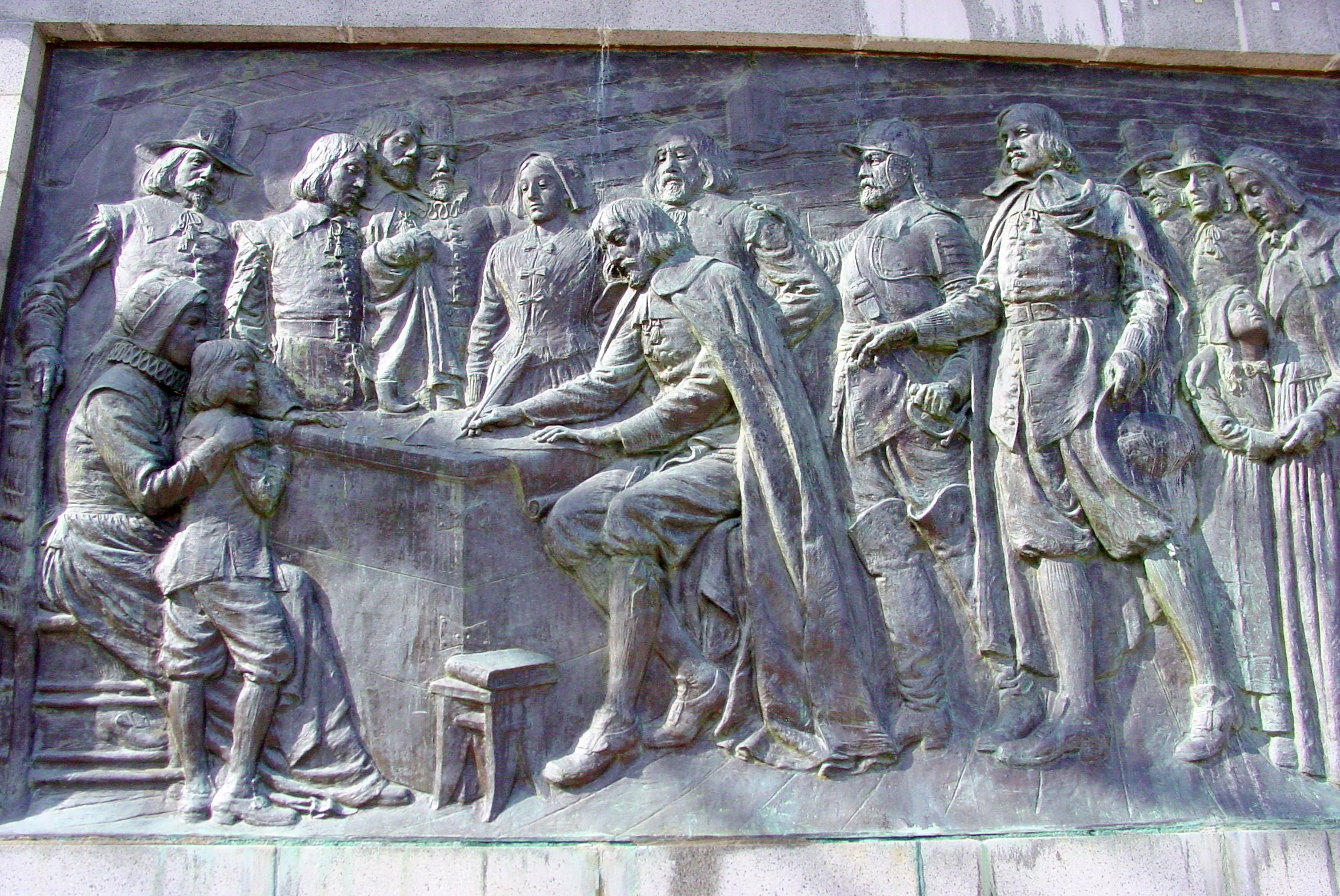
Signing of the Mayflower Compact (1922) by Cyrus E. Dallin

The figure of the boy on the left is based on Dallin’s son Lawrence and the woman standing overseeing Bradford’s signature is modelled on Vittoria Collona Dallin, his wife. The female standing with a child on the right is based on Dallin’s own sculpture of Anne Hutchinson which stands on the grounds of the Massachusetts State House. Renowned trailblazing sculptor Anne Whitney had modeled for that work.

According to remarks by Thomas Thacher the monument was designed with the concept of the Shaw Memorial in front of the Massachusetts State House. Both are substantial multifigured bronze reliefs mounted in stone with seating on either side. Two major differences are that the Shaw Memorial by Augustus Saint-Gaudens is in high-relief and rests in a setting of Tennessee marble.

In 2019, the town completed a restoration of the relief, supporting granite structure and grounds of Bas Relief Park. This effort culminated a process begun in 2016 in anticipation of the 400th anniversary of the Pilgrims arrival in 2020.

== See also ==
- List of sculptures by Cyrus Dallin in Massachusetts
