= Memory (Dallin) =

Bronze sculpture by Cyrus E. Dallin

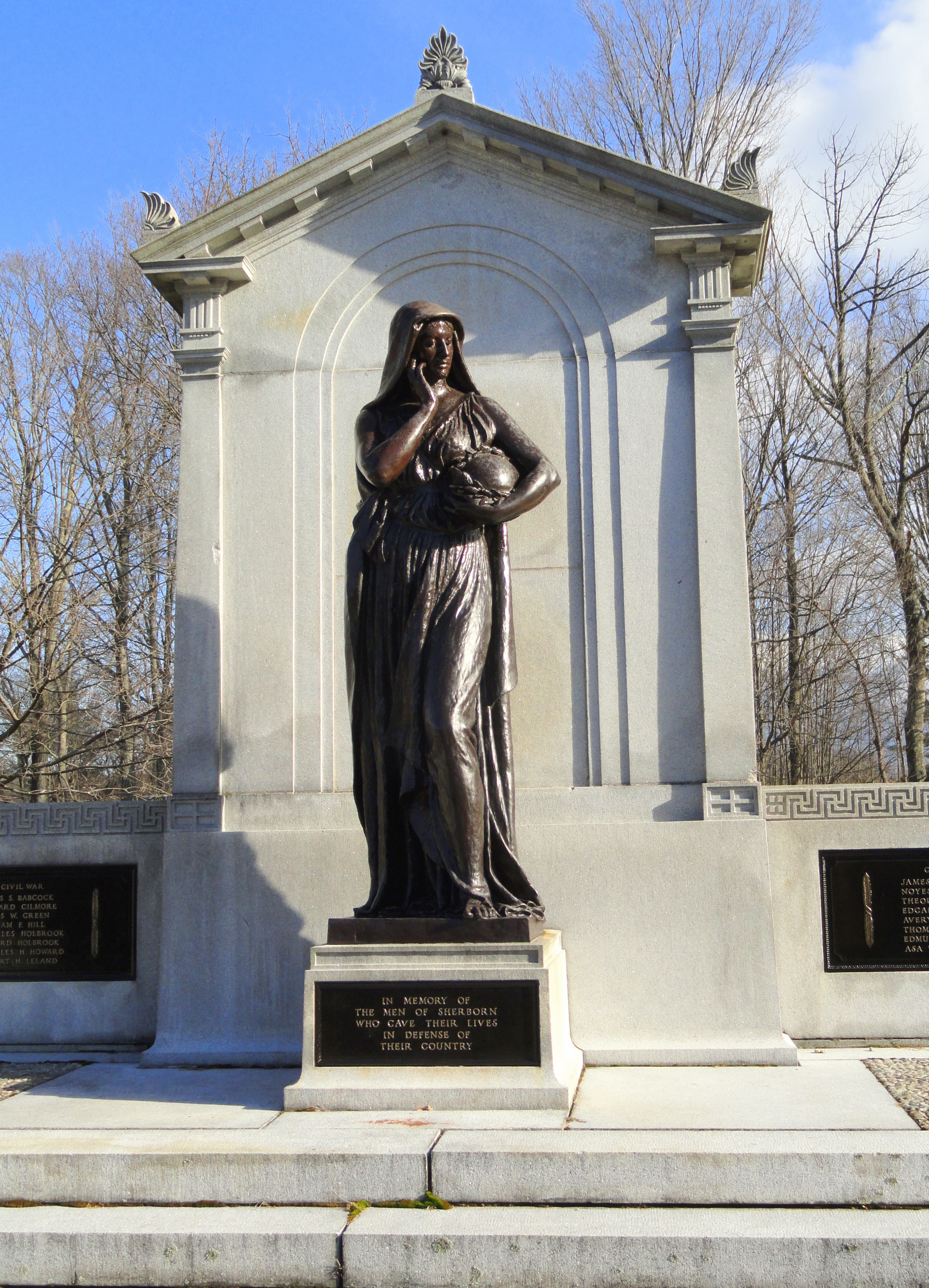
- Artist: Cyrus Edwin Dallin
- Year: 1924
- Location: Sherborn, Massachusetts
- 42°14′33″N 71°22′12″W

Memory (1924) is an 8-foot-tall bronze sculpture of a woman by Cyrus E. Dallin located in the Sherborn War Memorial in Sherborn, Massachusetts' Central Cemetery.

== Description ==
The sculpture depicts a female figure of Memory standing with her right hand held to her cheek in contemplation. Her left arm holds a World War I doughboy helmet encircled by a laurel wreath. She is standing in a contrapposto position wearing a high-wasted robe. This posture in dress combined with the viewers position looking up at the work places prominence on the hips.

The sculpture rests atop a granite plinth in an impressive granite exedra of New Hampshire Granite designed by Boston architect William Ware Dinsmore. Immediately behind the sculpture is a tall wall with two benches embedded in lower walls on either side. Six bronze plaques with the names of town residents who died in defense of their country from as early as King Philip's War through World War I. Among the sixteen American Civil War casualties are two men from the 54th Massachusetts Regiment. That regiment is honored in the Shaw Memorial by Augustus Saint-Gaudens in Boston.

== History ==
William Bradford Homer Dowse, a town resident and prominent lawyer, businessman and philanthropist, funded the sculpture to honor the men of Sherborn who died in wars from 1676-1918. The statue and monument were dedicated on October 14, 1924 at a ceremony marking the town’s 250th anniversary.

In 2017 the town received a grant from the Massachusetts Preservation Projects Fund to restore the statue as light green copper sulfate corrosion was visible on the head and hands with black copper sulfide settling into the garment folds. The restoration left the statue with a uniform dark bronze color that makes discerning the sculptural details challenging.

== See also ==
- List of sculptures by Cyrus Dallin in Massachusetts
