= Passing of the Buffalo =

Bronze sculpture by Cyrus E. Dallin

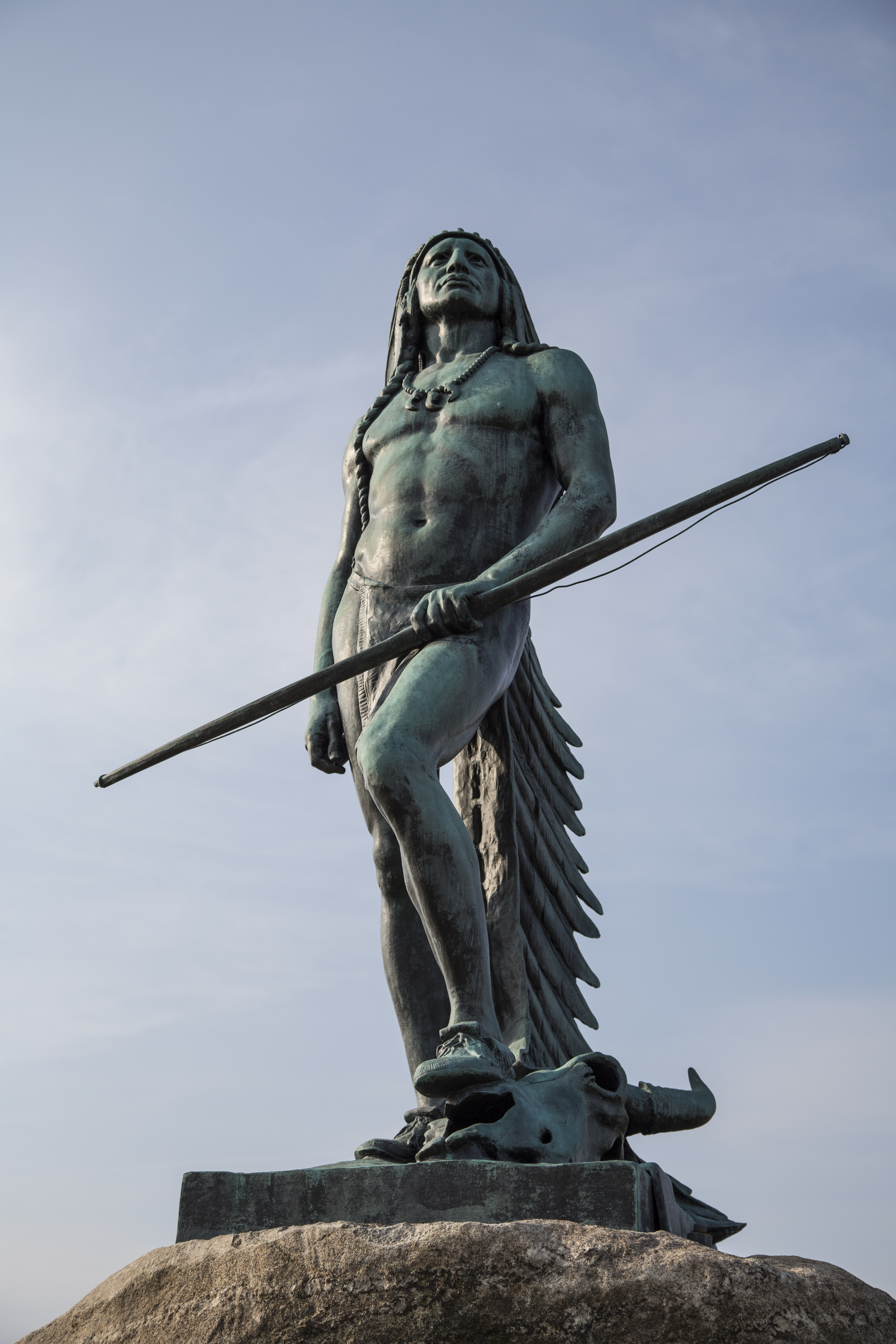
- Artist: Cyrus Edwin Dallin
- Year: 1929
- Medium: Bronze
- Location: Muncie, Indiana, US
- 40°11′22″N 85°23′11″W

Passing of the Buffalo (1929) is a 9-foot (2.7 m) bronze sculpture of an indigenous man by Cyrus E. Dallin, which rests on a 5-foot-tall gray boulder located in Muncie, Indiana, United States. It is also known as The Last Arrow.

== Description ==
The sculpture depicts a male figure clad in a breach cloth and a full-length war bonnet standing in the contrapposto position. His left hand holds a bow and his left foot rests upon a bison skull. The sculpture is placed atop a granite bolder, which is located in a traffic rotary at the intersection of Walnut and Seymor Streets. The sculpture is within sight of the only full-sized copy of Dallin's Appeal to the Great Spirit sculpture that is down the street. The original Appeal to the Great Spirit is a landmark piece in front of Boston's Museum of Fine Arts.

== History ==
Geraldine R. Dodge commissioned the sculpture, and it was initially located at Hartley Farms, her Madison, New Jersey estate. Dallin visited the site at the time of its installation and selected the boulder on which it rests. Dodge was an avid collector of sculpture and a significant benefactor of Dallin with twenty of his works in the auction of her estate.

The sculpture is significant in that in the 1975 Sotheby Parke Bernet auction, it set the record for a piece of Sculpture by an American with a sale price of $150,000. The sculpture was purchased by the wife and family of Fred J. Petty in his honor. Initially the sculpture was placed at the intersection of Walnut and Charles Street in front of the Ball Stores department store.

In 1999 the Ball Store edifice was torn down and the sculpture moved to the Minnetrista Museum and Gardens on the scenic shore of the White River. It was moved to its current downtown location on September 26, 2007.
