= Cyrus Edwin Dallin =

American sculptor (1861–1944)

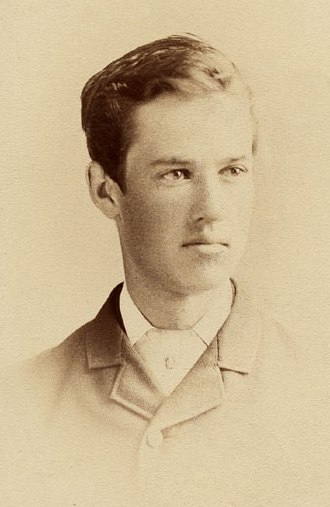
- Dallin in c. 1880
- Born: November 22, 1861; Springville, Utah, U.S.
- Died: November 14, 1944 (aged 82); Arlington, Massachusetts, U.S.
- Education: Académie Julian
- Known for: Sculpture
- Notable work: The Angel Moroni (1893); Appeal to the Great Spirit (1908); Paul Revere (1940)
- Spouse: Vittoria Colonna Murray

Cyrus Edwin Dallin (November 22, 1861 – November 14, 1944) was an American sculptor best known for his depictions of Native Americans. He created more than 260 works, including the Equestrian Statue of Paul Revere in Boston; the Angel Moroni atop Salt Lake Temple in Salt Lake City; and Appeal to the Great Spirit (1908), at the Museum of Fine Arts, Boston. He was also an accomplished painter and an Olympic archer.

== Early life and education ==
Dallin was born in Springville, Utah Territory, the son of Thomas and Jane (Hamer) Dallin, both of whom had left the Church of Jesus Christ of Latter-day Saints before their marriage.

At age 19, Dallin moved from Utah to Boston to study sculpture with Truman Howe Bartlett. Two wealthy Utah mining investors; C.H. Blanchard and Jacob Lawrence funded his move. He then studied in with Henri Chapu and at the Académie Julian in Paris.

== Career ==
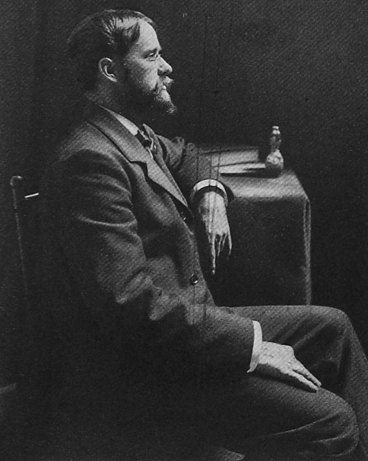
An 1899 portrait of Dallin

In 1883, Dallin entered a competition to sculpt an equestrian statue of Paul Revere for Boston, Massachusetts. He won the competition and received a contract, but six versions of his model were rejected. The fifth model was not accepted because of fundraising problems. The seventh version was accepted in 1939 and the full-size statue was unveiled in 1940.

Dallin converted to Unitarianism and initially turned down the offer to sculpt the angel Moroni for the spire of the LDS Church's Salt Lake Temple. He later accepted the commission and, after finishing the statue said, "My angel Moroni brought me nearer to God than anything I ever did." His statue became a symbol for the LDS Church and was the model for other angel Moroni statues on the spires of LDS Church temples.

In Boston, Dallin became a colleague of Augustus St. Gaudens and a close friend of painters John Singer Sargent and William McGregor Paxton with whom he played baseball for the St. Botolph Club. He married Vittoria Colonna Murray in 1891 and returned to Utah to work on The Angel Moroni (1893). He taught for a year at the Drexel Institute in Philadelphia, Pennsylvania, while completing his Sir Isaac Newton (1895) for the Library of Congress. In 1897, he traveled to Paris, and studied with Jean Dampt. In 1889 and 1890 he developed a friendship with prominent European painter Rosa Bonheur. Together they traveled to Neuilly outside of Paris to sketch the animals and cast of Buffalo Bill Cody's Wild West Show at their encampment.

He entered a Don Quixote statuette in the Salon of 1897, and The Medicine Man in the Salon of 1899 and the Exposition Universelle (1900). The couple moved to Arlington, Massachusetts, in 1900, where they established their residence and raised three sons.

Medal record

Men's Archery

Representing the United States

Olympic Games
| Bronze medal – third place | 1904 St. Louis | Team round |

At the 1904 Summer Olympics in St. Louis, Dallin competed in archery, winning the bronze medal in the team competition. He finished ninth in the Double American round and 12th in the Double York round.

From 1899 to 1941, he was a member of the faculty of Massachusetts Normal Art School, now the Massachusetts College of Art and Design, where his more notable students included Bashka Paeff, Vincent Schofield Wickham and Ruth Johnston Surez. In 1912, he was elected to the National Academy of Design as an Associate member and became a full Academician in 1930. He also was a member of the National Sculpture Society and the National Association of Arts and Letters, as well as an associate at the National Academy of Design.

=== Equestrian sculptures of indigenous peoples ===
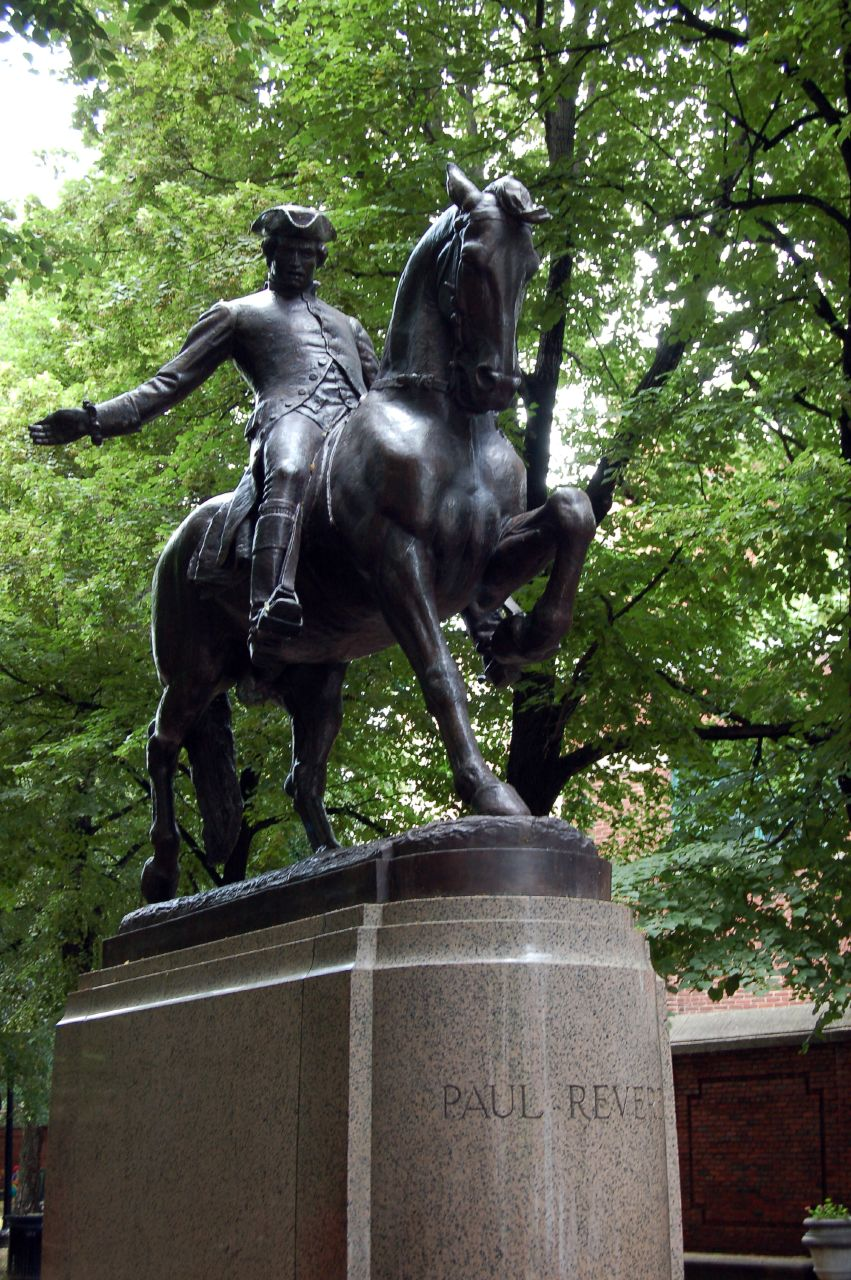
Equestrian Statue of Paul Revere, a 1940 statue by Dallin at Old North Church in Boston, where Revere said he would forewarn American patriots if the British Army were approaching by hanging "one lantern if by land, two if by sea".

Dallin created four prominent equestrian sculptures of indigenous people: A Signal of Peace, or The Welcome (1890); The Medicine Man, or The Warning (1899); Protest of the Sioux, or The Defiance (1904); and Appeal to the Great Spirit (1908).

A Signal of Peace was exhibited at the 1893 World's Columbian Exposition and was installed in Chicago's Lincoln Park in 1894. The Medicine Man was exhibited at the 1899 Paris Salon, and the 1900 Exposition Universelle in Paris, where it won a gold medal. It was installed in Philadelphia's Fairmount Park in 1903.

The full-size staff version of Protest of the Sioux was exhibited at the 1904 Louisiana Purchase Exposition, where it won a gold medal. The mounted brave defiantly shaking his fist at an enemy was never cast as a full-size bronze and survives only in statuette form. A one-third-size bronze version, cast in 1986, is at the Springville Museum of Art in Springville, Utah.

Appeal to the Great Spirit became an icon of American art and is Dallin's most famous work. The full-size version was cast in bronze in Paris and won a gold medal at the 1909 Paris Salon. It was installed outside the main entrance to the Boston Museum of Fine Arts in 1912. Smaller versions of the work are in numerous American museums and in the permanent collection of the White House.

In 1929, a full-sized bronze version of Appeal to the Great Spirit—personally overseen and approved by Dallin— was installed in Muncie, Indiana, at the intersection of Walnut and Granville Streets, and is considered by many residents to be a symbol of their city. Benefactors of the city would later add to their Dallin portfolio through the purchase of the Passing of the Buffalo sculpture, which had been commissioned by Geraldine R. Dodge. A one-third-size plaster version of the Appeal was given to Tulsa, Oklahoma's Central High in 1923. It stood in the school's main hall until 1976, when Central closed its doors. In 1985, that plaster was used to cast a one-third-size bronze version, which is now in Woodward Park (Tulsa), at the intersection of 21st and Peoria Streets. There is also a version at St. John University in Wisconsin.

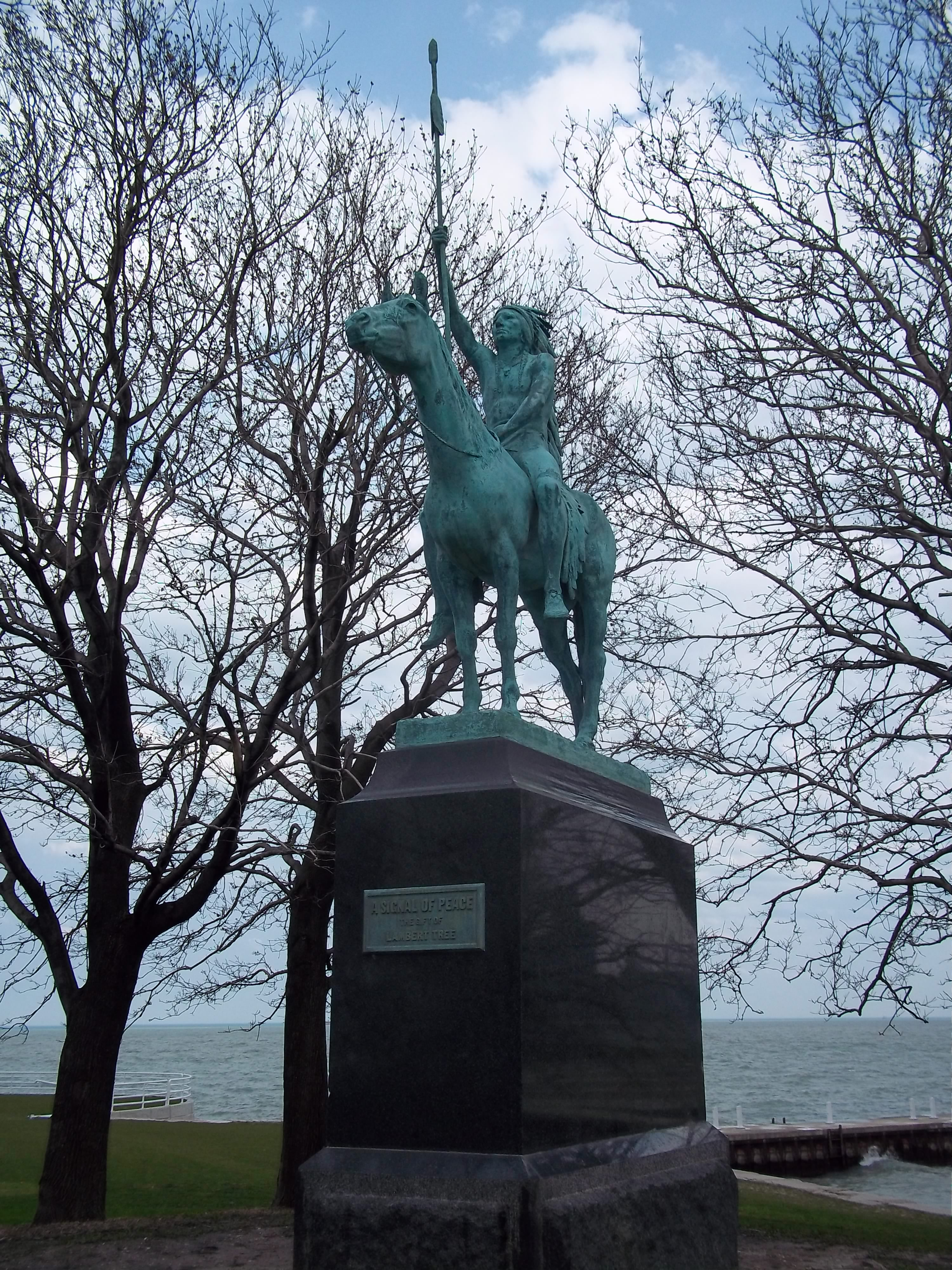
A Signal of Peace (1890) in Lincoln Park in Chicago

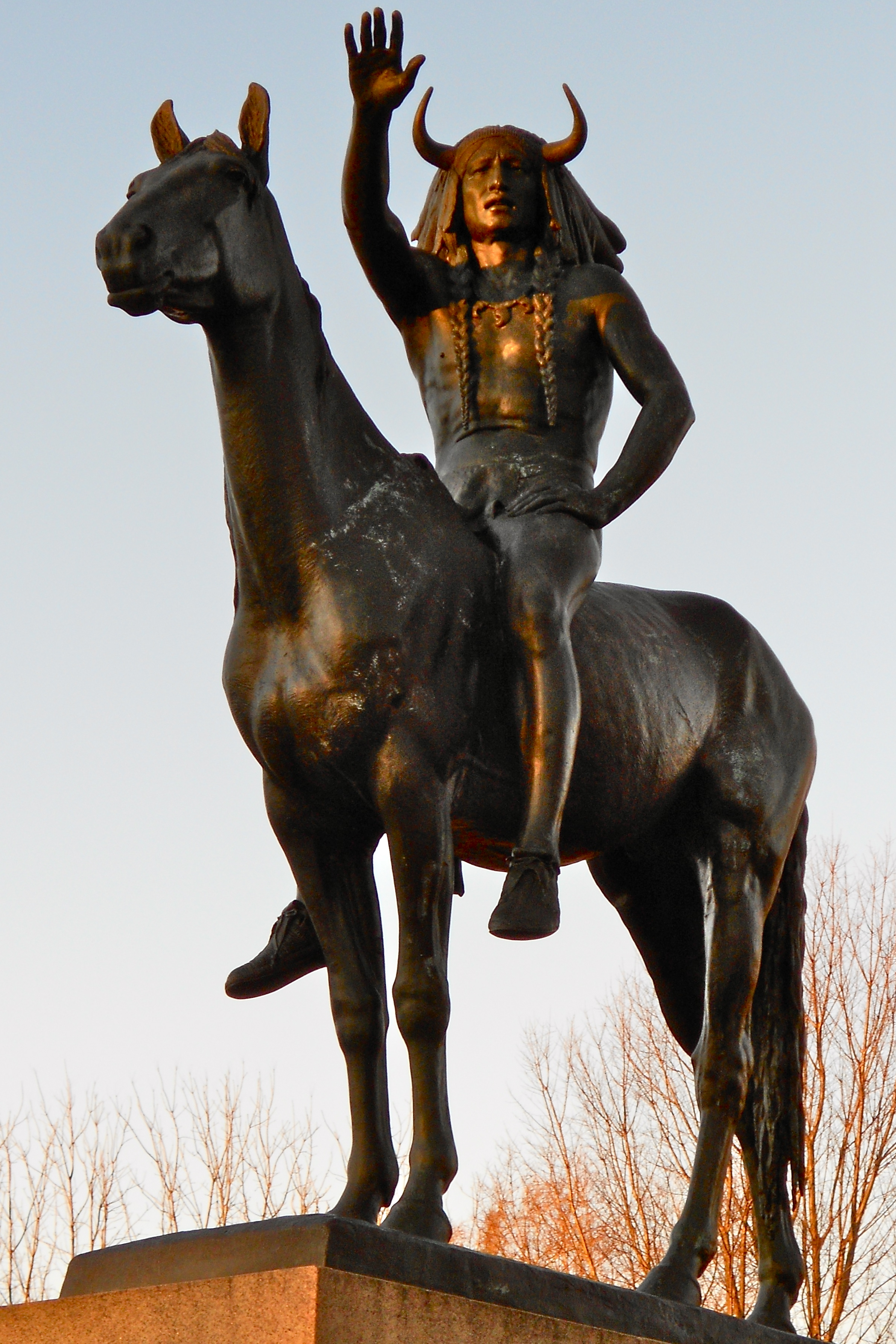
The Medicine Man (1899) in Fairmount Park in Philadelphia

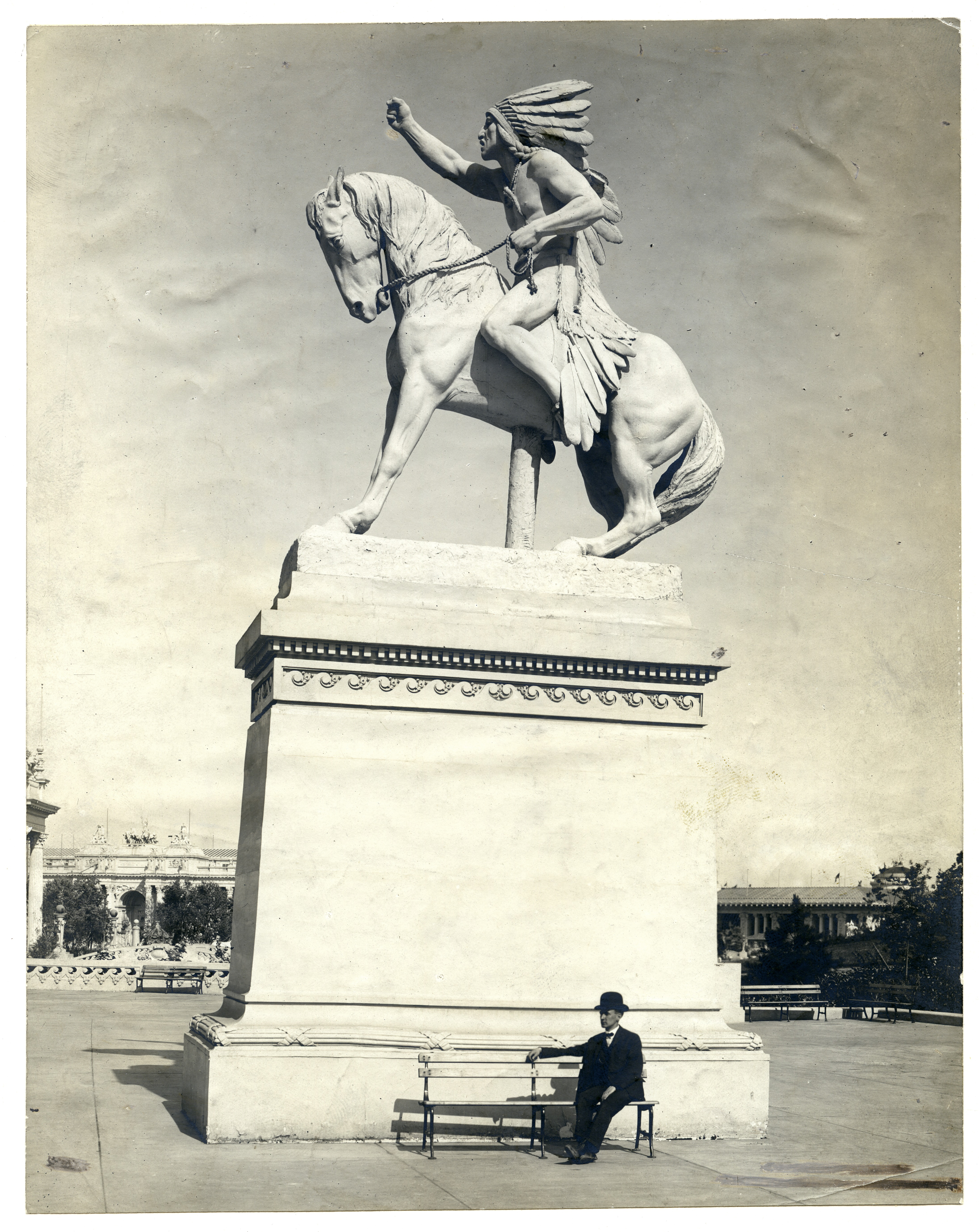
Protest of the Sioux (1904) at the 1904 St. Louis World's Fair

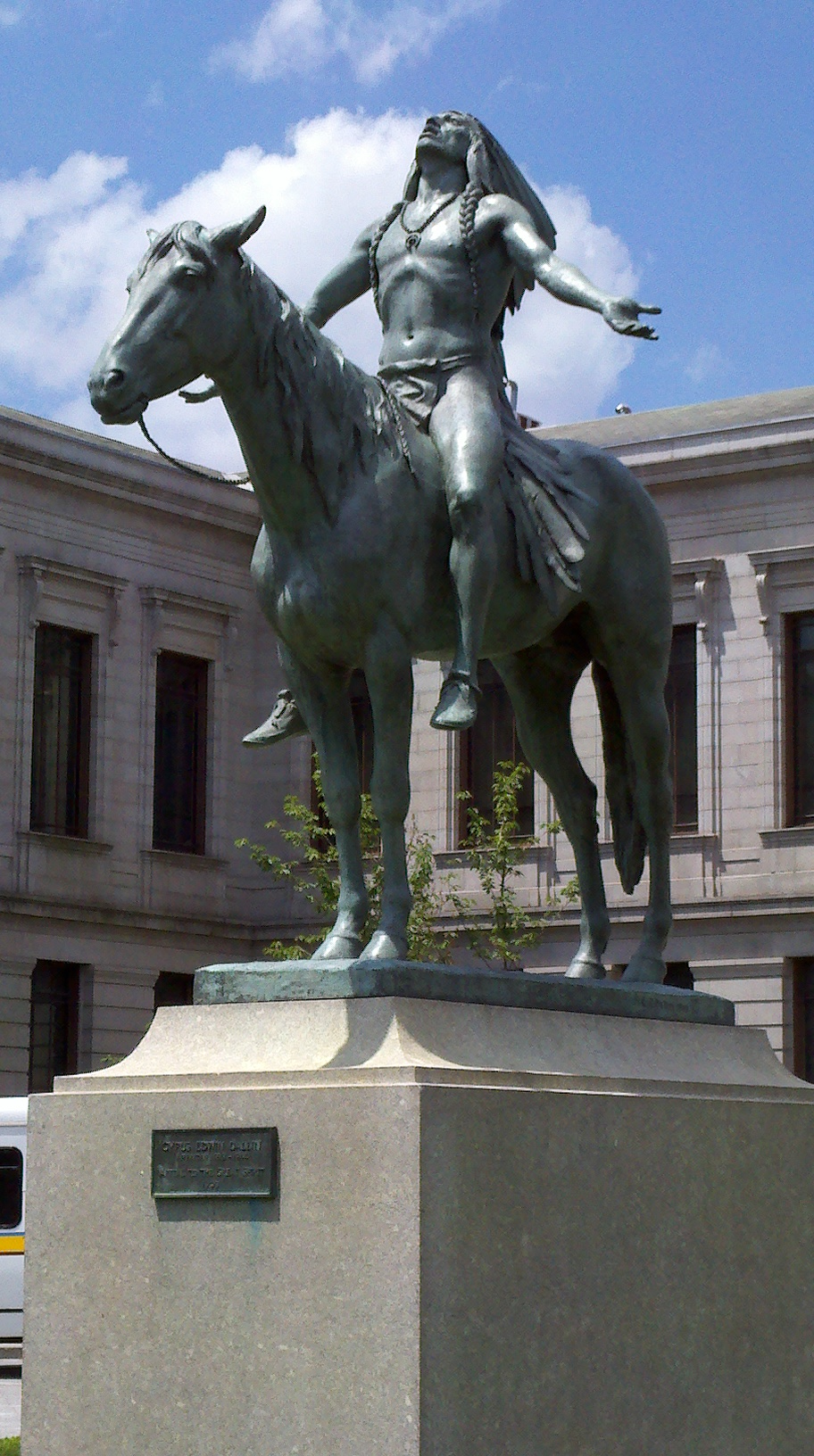
Appeal to the Great Spirit (1908) at the Museum of Fine Arts in Boston

== Death ==
When he died in 1944, his life was celebrated in a Unitarian service at Arlington's First Parish Church. He is buried in Mount Pleasant Cemetery in Arlington, Massachusetts.

== Legacy ==
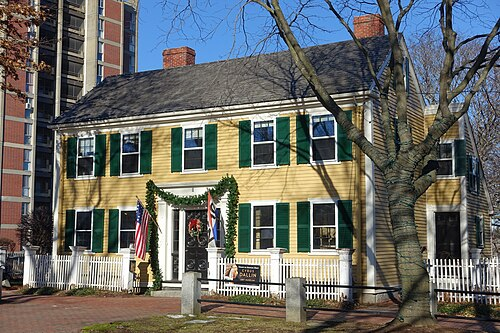
Cyrus Dallin Art Museum (Arlington, MA) in 2019

More than sixty of Dallin's works are collected in the Cyrus Dallin Art Museum located in the Jefferson Cutter House in Arlington, Massachusetts. Many of his sculptures are also in the vicinity.

An elementary school in Arlington, Massachusetts is named for him.

The Taylor-Dallin House in Arlington where Dallin and his family lived is a privately owned residence and has been listed on the National Register of Historic Places.

More than 30 of Dallin's works are on display at the Springville Museum of Art in his birthplace of Springville, Utah. The Dallin House at 253 S. 300 East Street in Springville is listed on the National Register of Historic Places.

Dallin's papers are at the Smithsonian Archives of American Art.

The Beach Boys based the logo for their Brother Records label on Dallin's sculpture, Appeal to the Great Spirit. In 2020, the Hood Museum of Art at Dartmouth College commissioned Cree artist Kent Monkman to prepare a work and he painted The Great Mystery, which reinterprets the Appeal to the Great Spirit sculpture incorporating a Mark Rothko painting in the background. The work is displayed near a mid-sized version of Dallin's sculpture.

From 2017 to 2020 a race horse named Cyrus Dallin raced in the United Kingdom.

== Selected works ==
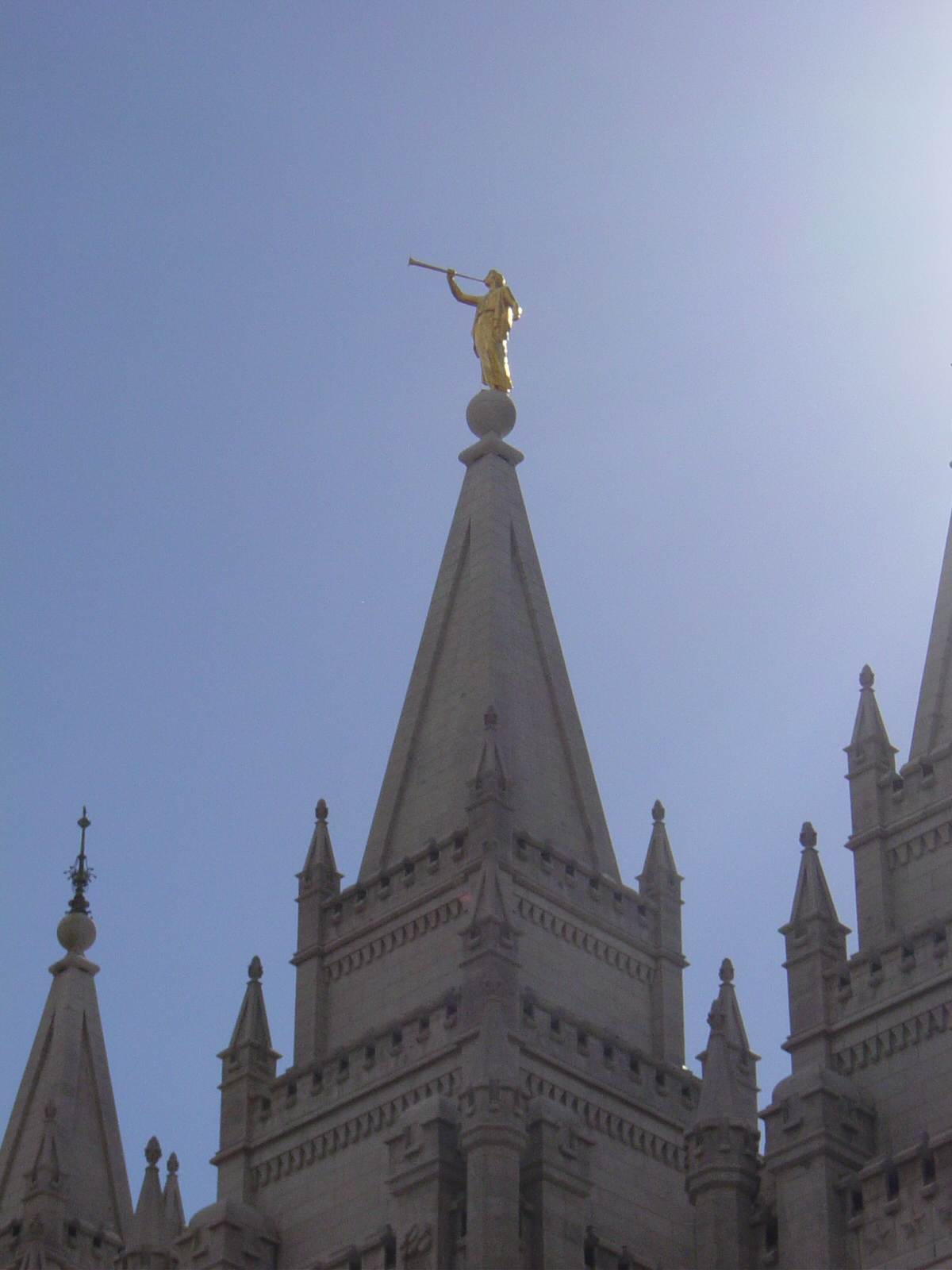
The Angel Moroni, an 1893 sculpture by Dallin on top of Salt Lake Temple in Salt Lake City since 1892

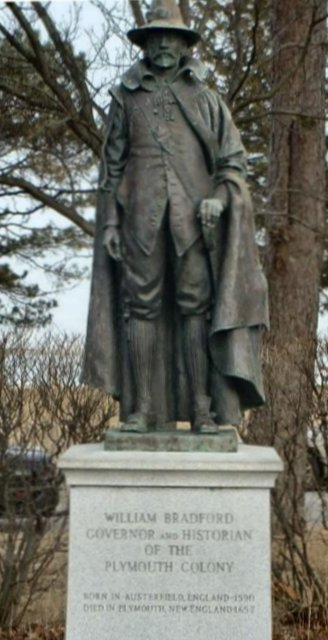
Governor William Bradford, a 1920 sculpture by Dallin dedicated at Pilgrim Hall Museum in 1976, honoring William Bradford, governor of Plymouth Colony from 1621 to 1657

- John L. Sullivan (1888) Location unknown
- Model for Equestrian Statue of Lafayette (1889) at Smithsonian American Art Museum, Washington, D.C.
- The Angel Moroni (1893), atop Salt Lake Temple in Salt Lake City
- Brigham Young Monument (1893), Main and South Temple Streets in Salt Lake City
- Sunol (1893), Harness Racing Museum & Hall of Fame in Goshen, New York
- Sir Isaac Newton (1895), Main Reading Room, Library of Congress in Washington, D.C.
- Don Quixote de La Mancha: The Knight of the Windmill (1898), Springville Museum of Art, Springville, Utah
- Equestrian statue of Paul Revere (1899, dedicated 1940), Paul Revere Mall, opposite Old North Church in Boston
- Julia Ward Howe Tablet (1912) at Museum of Fine Arts in Boston
- View of Hobble Creek (ca 1900), Utah Museum of Fine Arts in Salt Lake City
- Eli Whitney Tablet (1902), Richmond County Courthouse in Augusta, Georgia
- The Picket (1905), Battle of Hanover in Hanover, Pennsylvania
- Victory (1909), Pioneer Park, Provo, Utah
- General Winfield Scott Hancock (1909–10), Pennsylvania State Memorial at Gettysburg Battlefield in Gettysburg, Pennsylvania
- Soldiers' and Sailors' Monument (1909–1911) at Clinton Square in Syracuse, New York
- My Boys (Dallin Sculpture) (c. 1910) at Robbins Memorial Library in Arlington, Massachusetts
- Robbins Memorial Flagstaff (1914) at Arlington Center Historic District in Arlington, Massachusetts
- Anne Hutchinson (1915, dedicated 1922), Massachusetts Statehouse in Boston
- Alma Mater (Missouri Sculpture) (1916), Mary Institute of Washington University in Ladue, Missouri
- Chief Justice William Cushing Memorial Tablet (1919) Scituate Historical Society in Scituate, Massachusetts
- Governor William Bradford (1920, dedicated 1976), Pilgrim Hall Museum in Plymouth, Massachusetts
- Oliver Wendell Holmes, Cyrus Dallin Art Museum in Arlington, Massachusetts
- Pilgrim Tercentenary half dollar (1920). The reverse of the 2026 Mayflower Compact quarter dollar, issued in recognition of the United States Semiquincentennial, is based on this design.
- Signing the Mayflower Compact (1921) in Provincetown, Massachusetts
- Boy and His Dog (1923) in Lincoln, Massachusetts
- Memory (1924) at Sherborn War Memorial in Sherborn, Massachusetts
- Spirit of Life (1929) at Springville Museum of Art in Springville, Utah
- Pioneer Women of Utah (1931) at Springville Museum of Art in Springville, Utah
- Memorial to The Pioneer Mothers of Springville (1932) at Springville City Park in Springville, Utah

=== Indigenous American works ===
- A Signal of Peace (1890) at Lincoln Park in Chicago, Illinois
- The Medicine Man (1899) at Fairmount Park in Philadelphia
- Protest of the Sioux (1904)
  - A one-third-size bronze version (cast 1986) is in the Springville Museum of Art in Springville, Utah
- Appeal to the Great Spirit (1908) at Boston Museum of Fine Arts in Boston
  - Smaller bronze versions are in Muncie, Indiana and the Museum of the West in Scottsdale, Arizona
  - A one-third-size plaster version and a 1985 bronze version cast from that plaster in Tulsa, Oklahoma
- The Scout (1910, dedicated 1922) at Penn Valley Park, Kansas City, Missouri
  - A one-third-size bronze version is in Seville, Spain, a 1992 gift from Kansas City, Missouri, Seville's sister-city
- Chief Joseph (1911) at the New York Historical Society in New York City
- Geronimo (1926)
- Menotomy Indian Hunter (1911) at the Arlington Center Historic District in Arlington, Massachusetts
- Massasoit (1920) at Cole's Hill opposite Plymouth Rock in Plymouth, Massachusetts
  - Other casts are at Utah State Capitol in Salt Lake City, Brigham Young University in Provo, Utah, Springville Museum of Art in Springville, Utah, Mill Creek Park in Kansas City, Missouri, and Dayton Art Institute in Dayton, Ohio
- On the Warpath #28 (c. 1920) at the Utah Museum of Fine Arts in Salt Lake City, Crystal Bridges Museum of American Art in Bentonville, Arkansas, Cyrus Dallin Art Museum in Arlington, Massachusetts, Brookgreen Garden Museum, Brookgreen, South Carolina,
- Passing of the Buffalo, also known as The Last Arrow (1929) in Muncie, Indiana
- Pretty Eagle, a portrait bust (cast in 1927-sculpted earlier)
- Robbins Memorial Flagstaff, (1914) a Native American woman with an infant, at Town Hall in Arlington, Massachusetts
- Sacagawea (1914) at Western Spirit: Scottsdale's Museum of the West in Scottsdale, Arizona with a plaster version at Cyrus Dallin Art Museum in Arlington, Massachusetts
- Sitting Bull (1926)
- Standing Elk, (1920) Topsfield, Massachusetts Topsfield Public Library

== Gallery ==
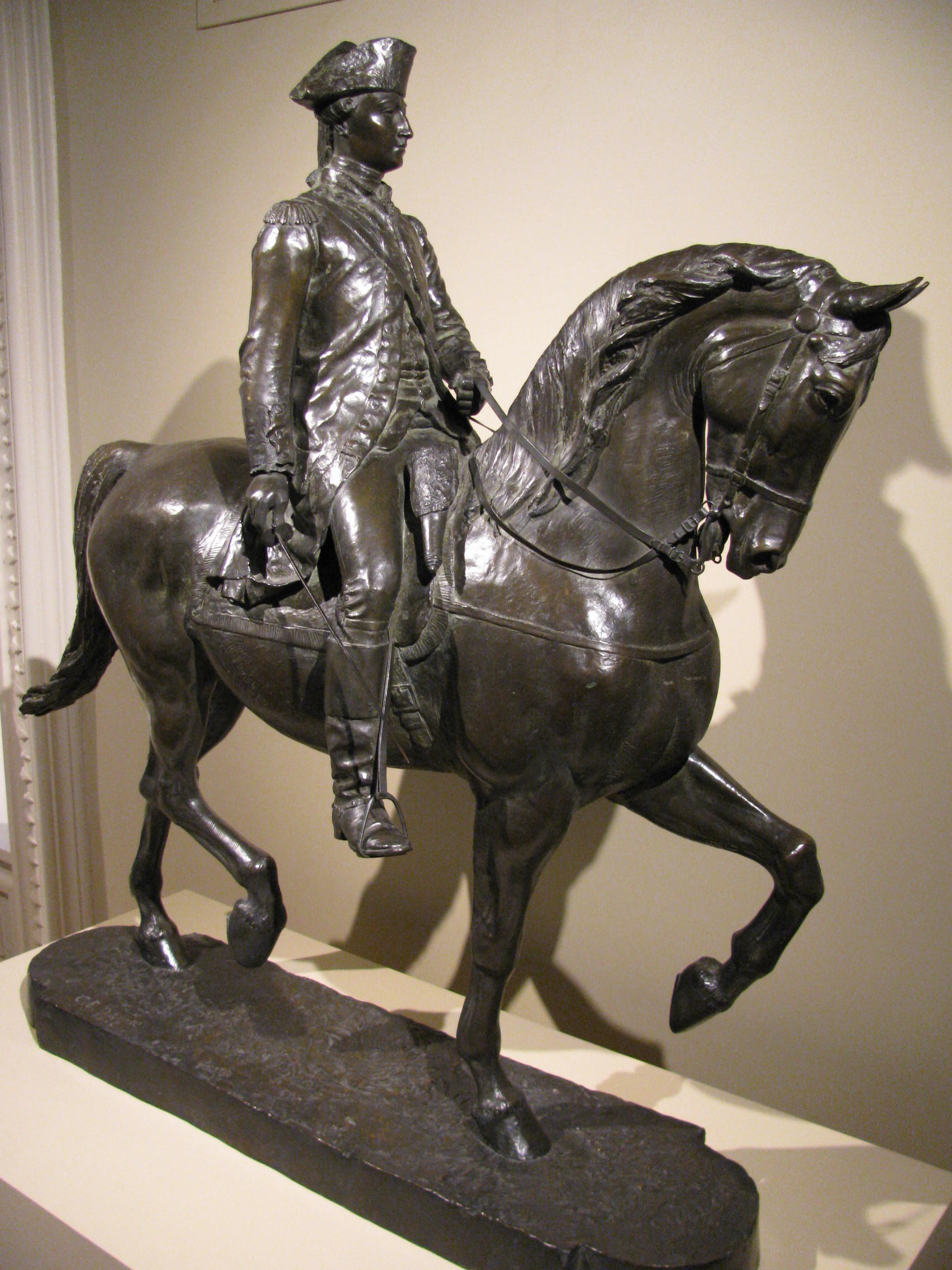
Model for Lafayette (1889) at the Smithsonian American Art Museum in Washington, D.C.

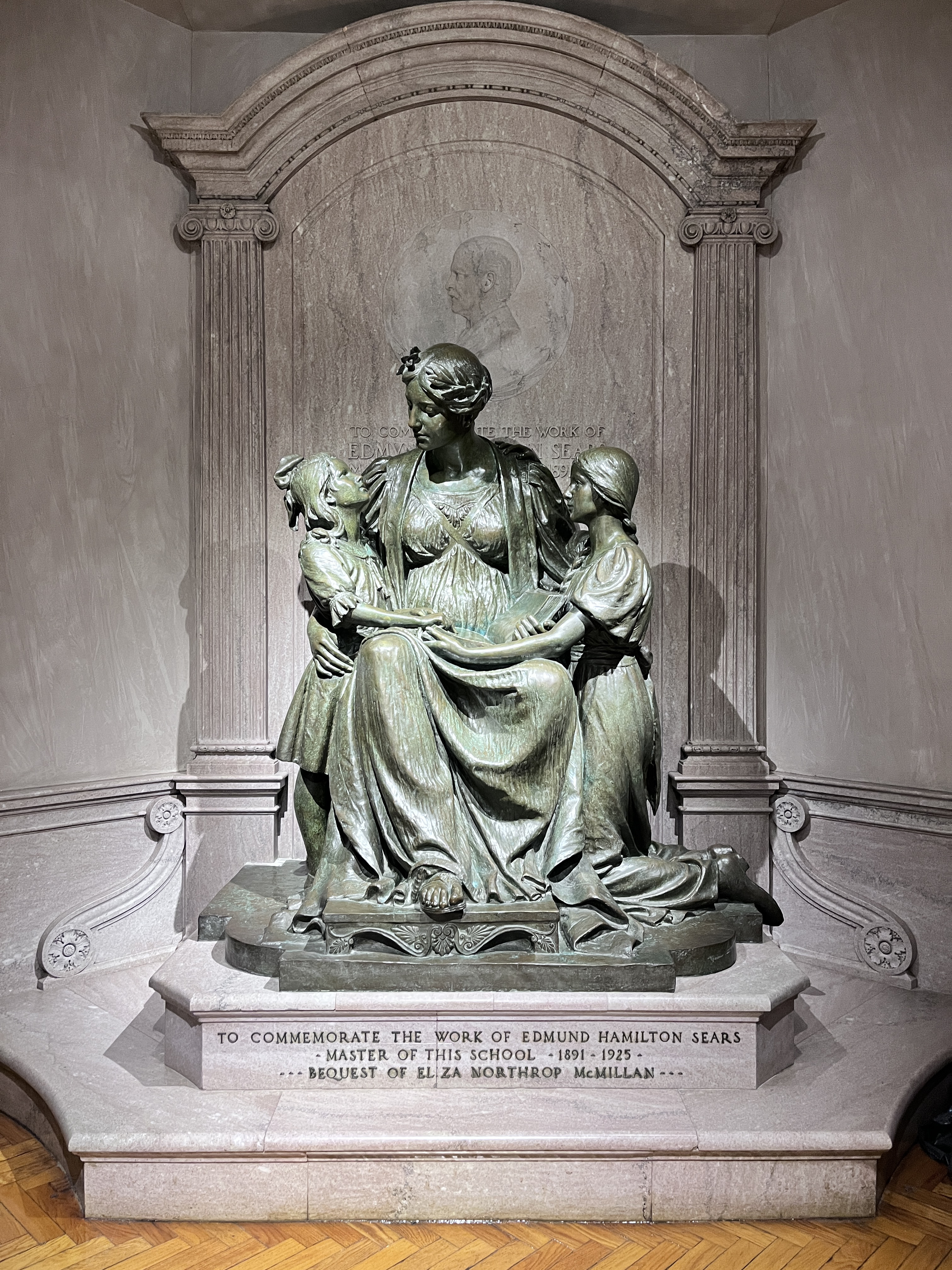
Alma Mater (1916) at the Mary Institute and St. Louis Country Day School

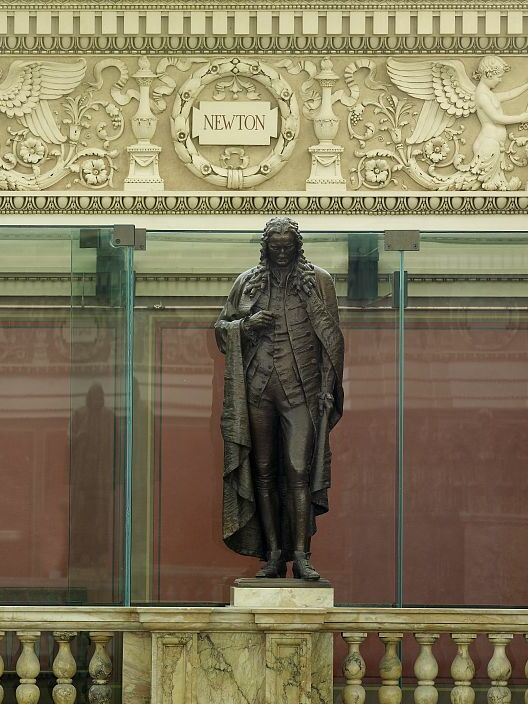
Sir Isaac Newton (1895) in the Library of Congress in Washington, D.C.

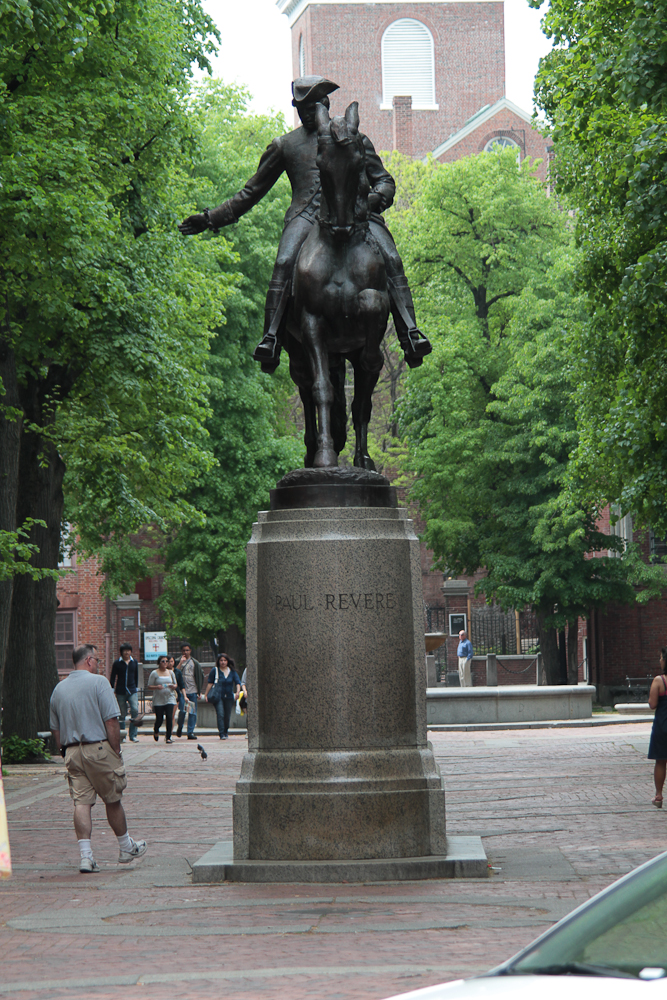
Paul Revere (1899, dedicated 1940) at Old North Church in Boston

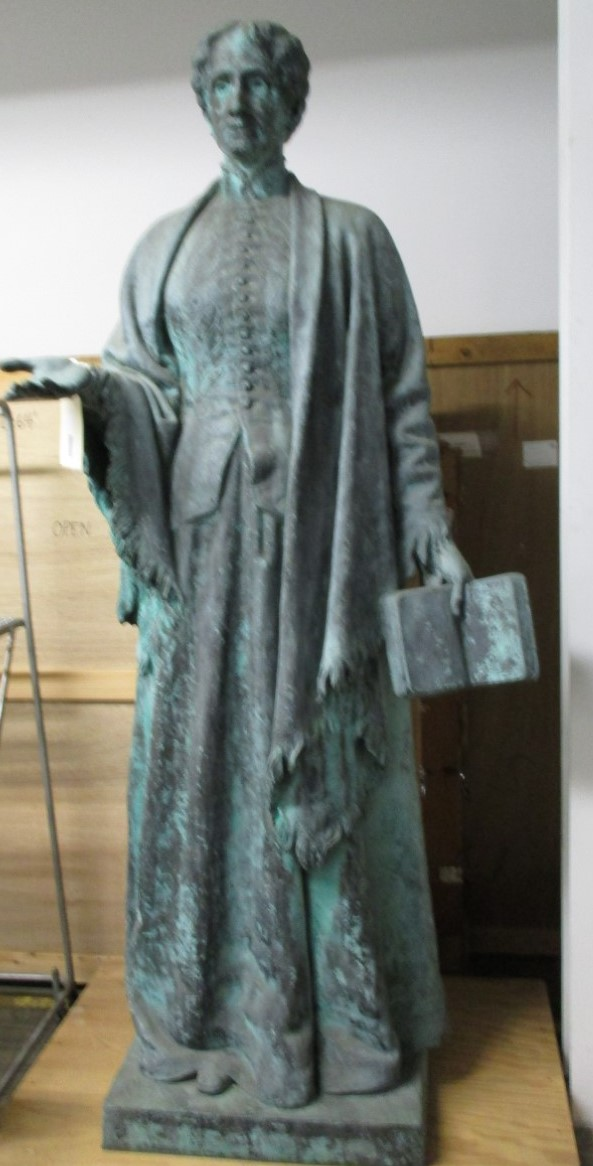
Mary Baker Eddy-This work is in storage.

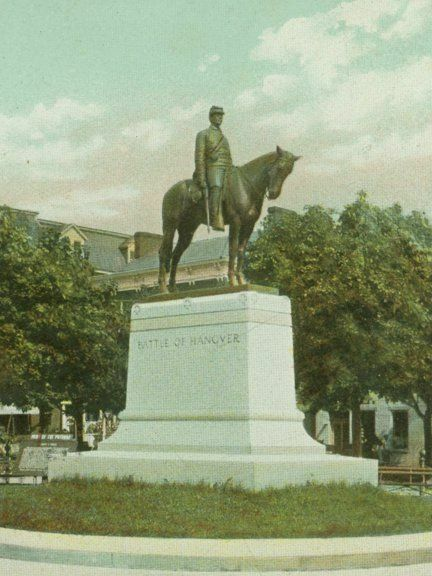
The Picket (1905), depicting the Battle of Hanover in Hanover, Pennsylvania

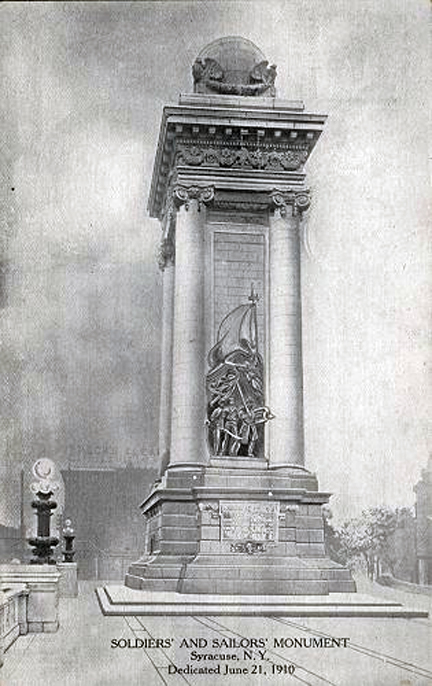
Soldiers' and Sailors' Monument (1909–1911) at Clinton Square in Syracuse, New York

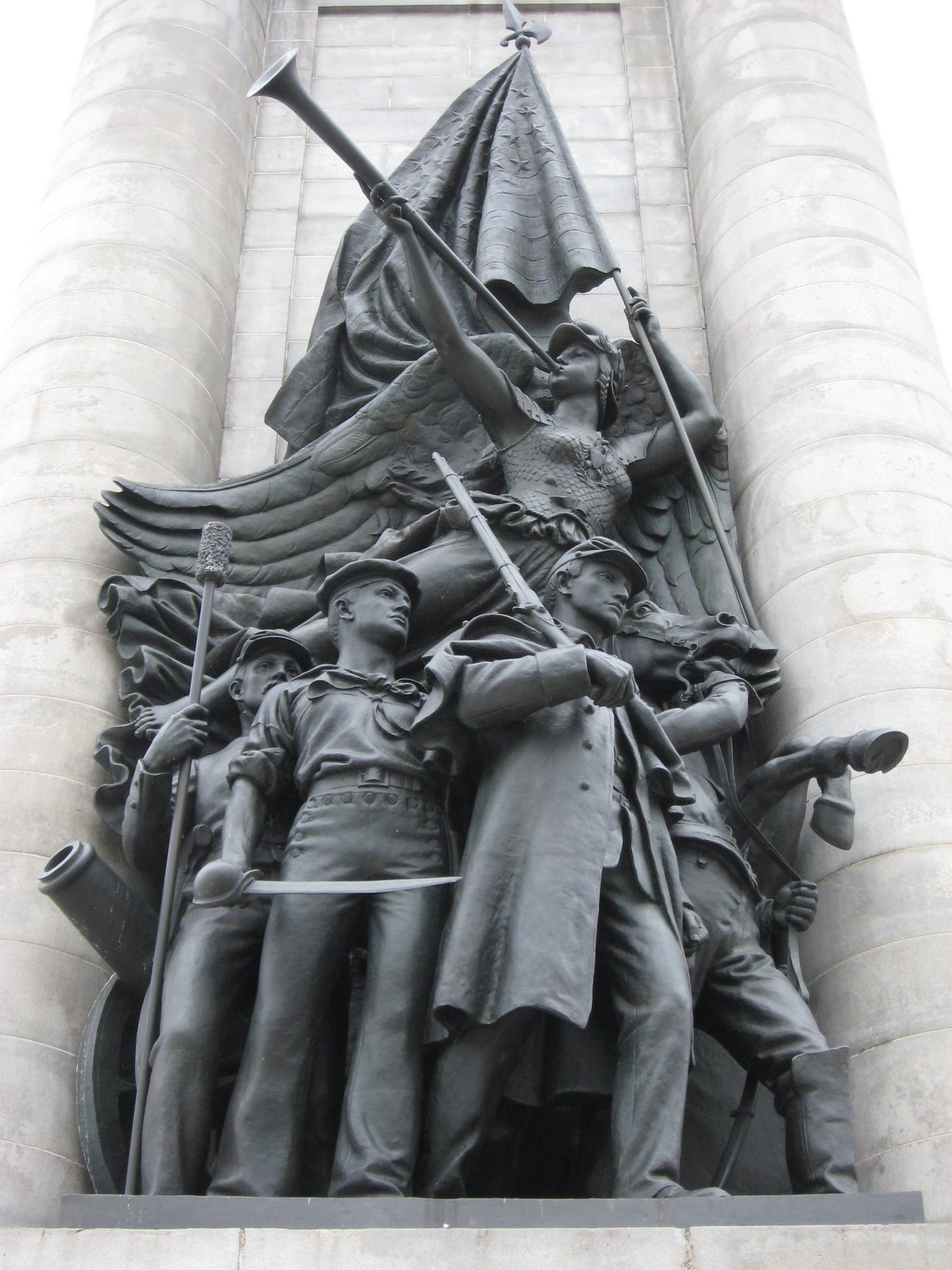
Soldiers' and Sailors' Monument detail

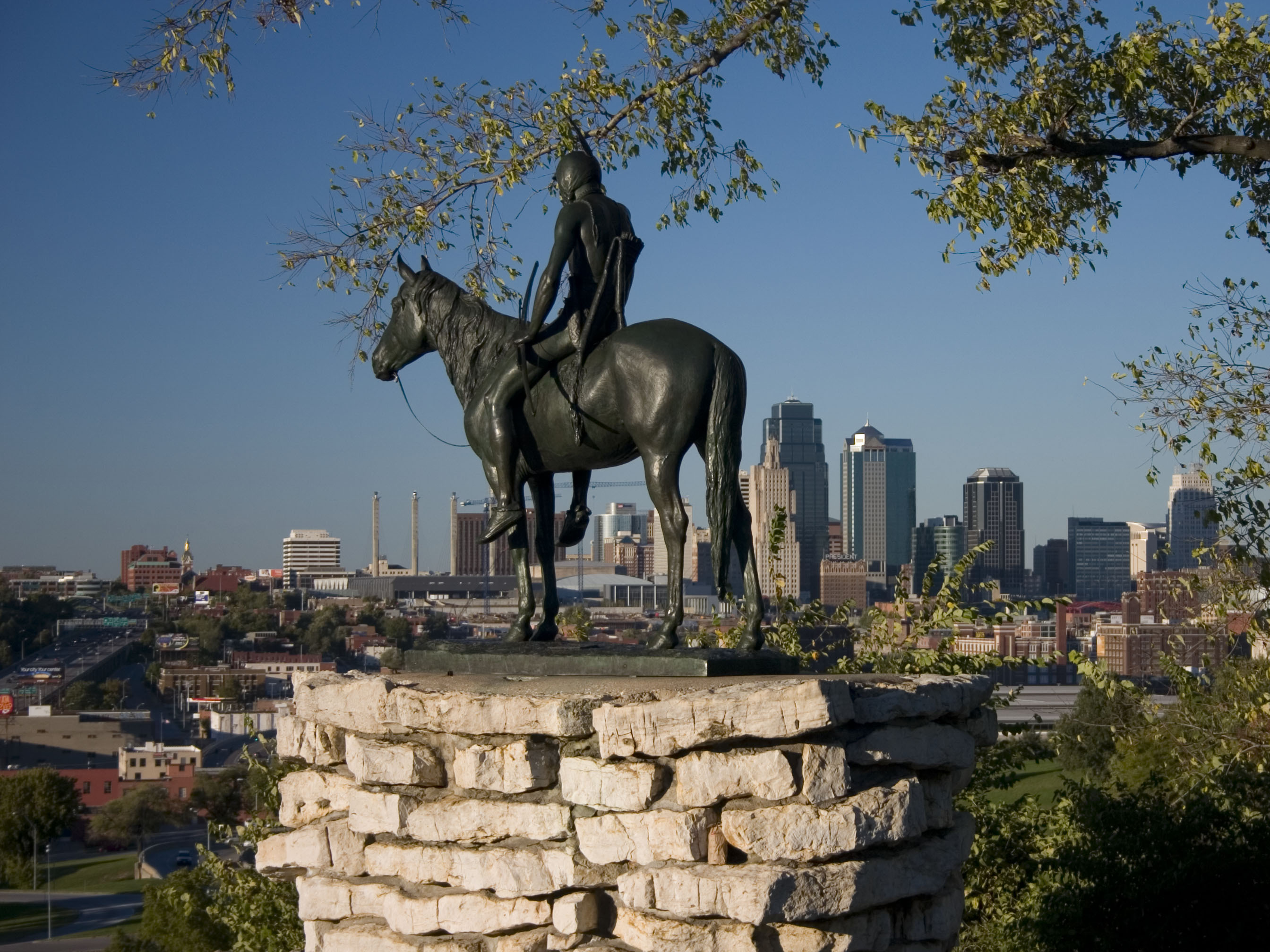
The Scout (1910) at Penn Valley Park in Kansas City, Missouri

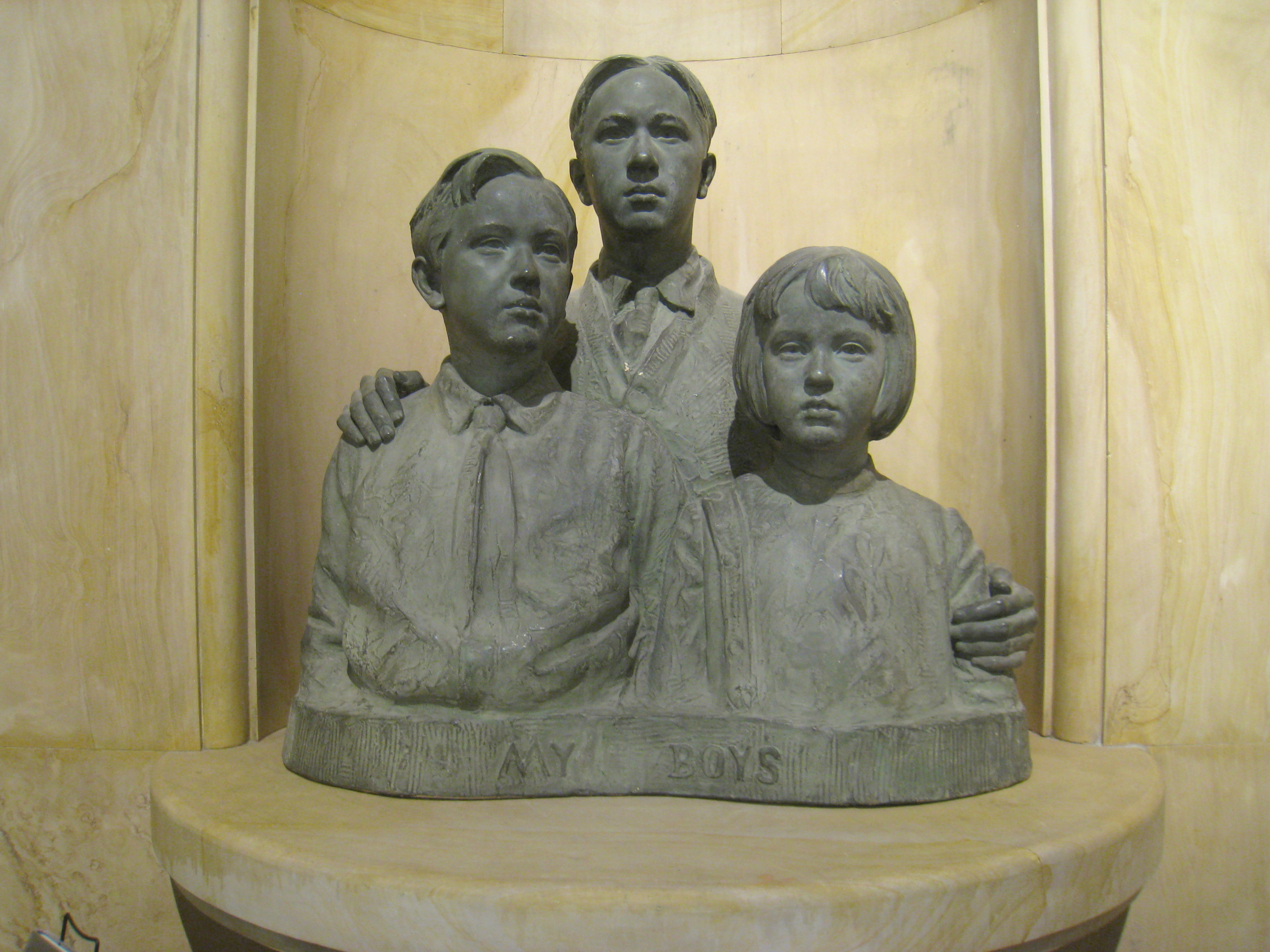
My Boys (c. 1910) at Robbins Memorial Library in Arlington, Massachusetts

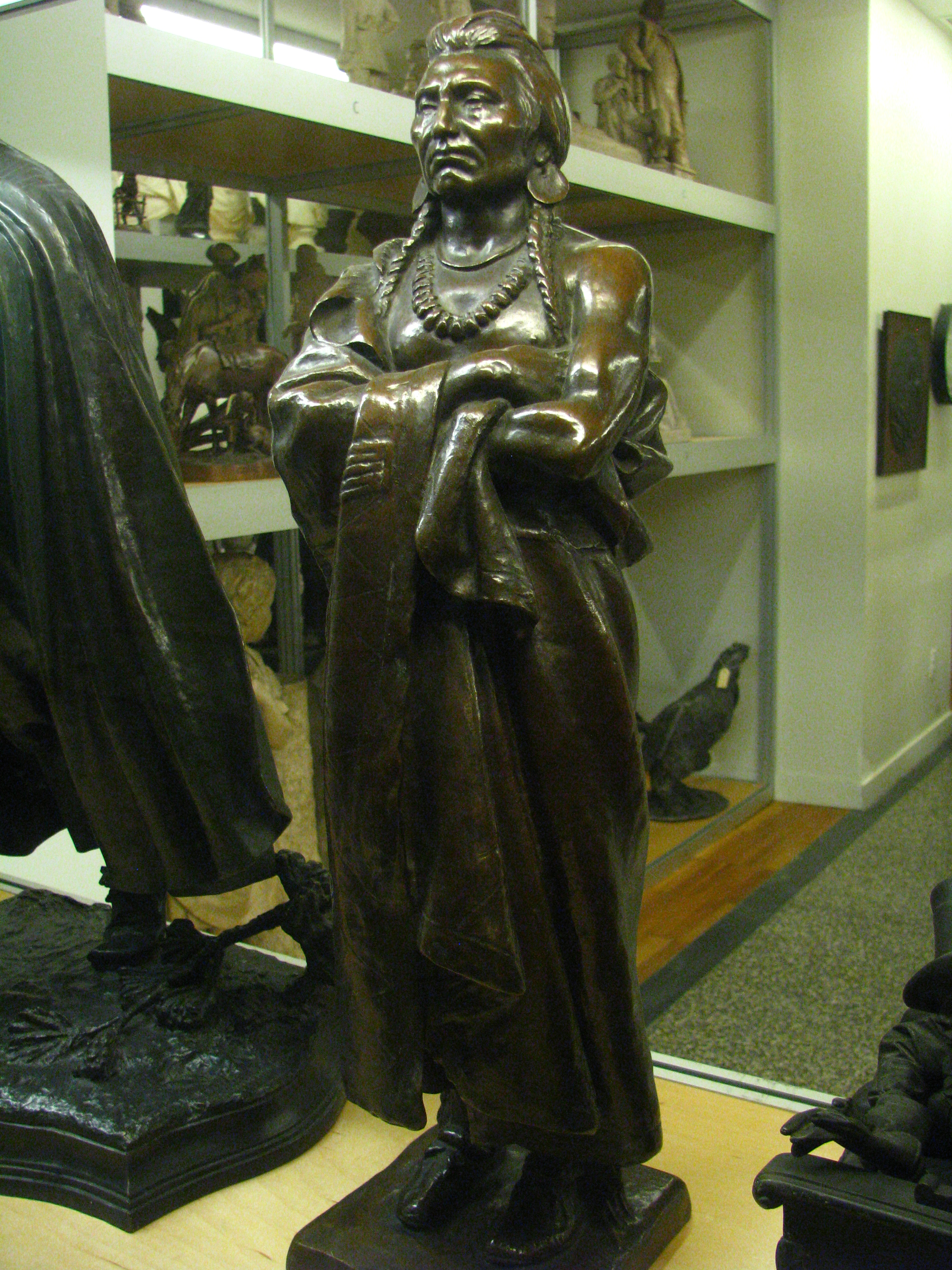
Chief Joseph (1911) at New York Historical Society in New York City

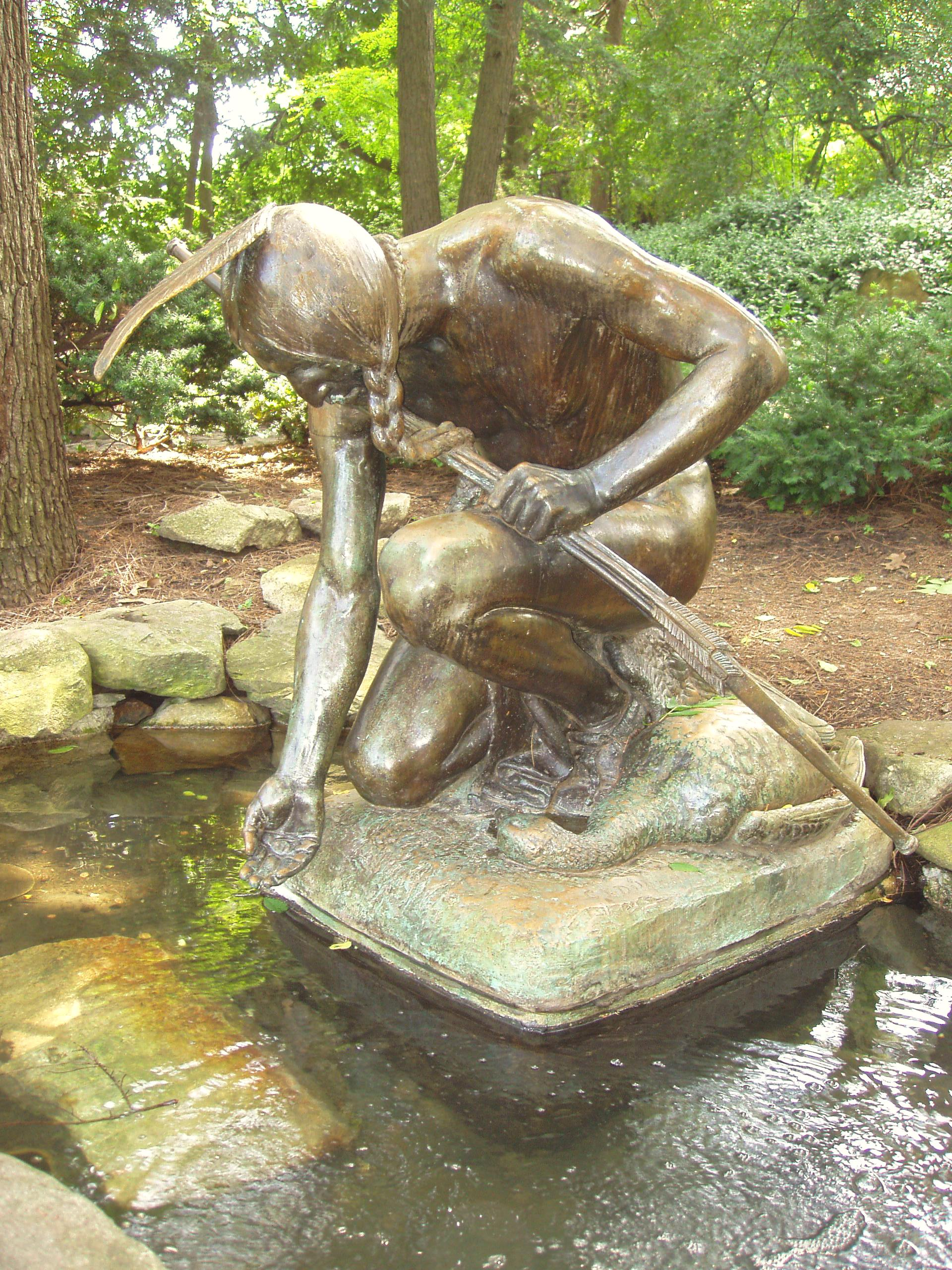
Menotomy Indian Hunter (1911) at Arlington Center Historic District in Arlington, Massachusetts

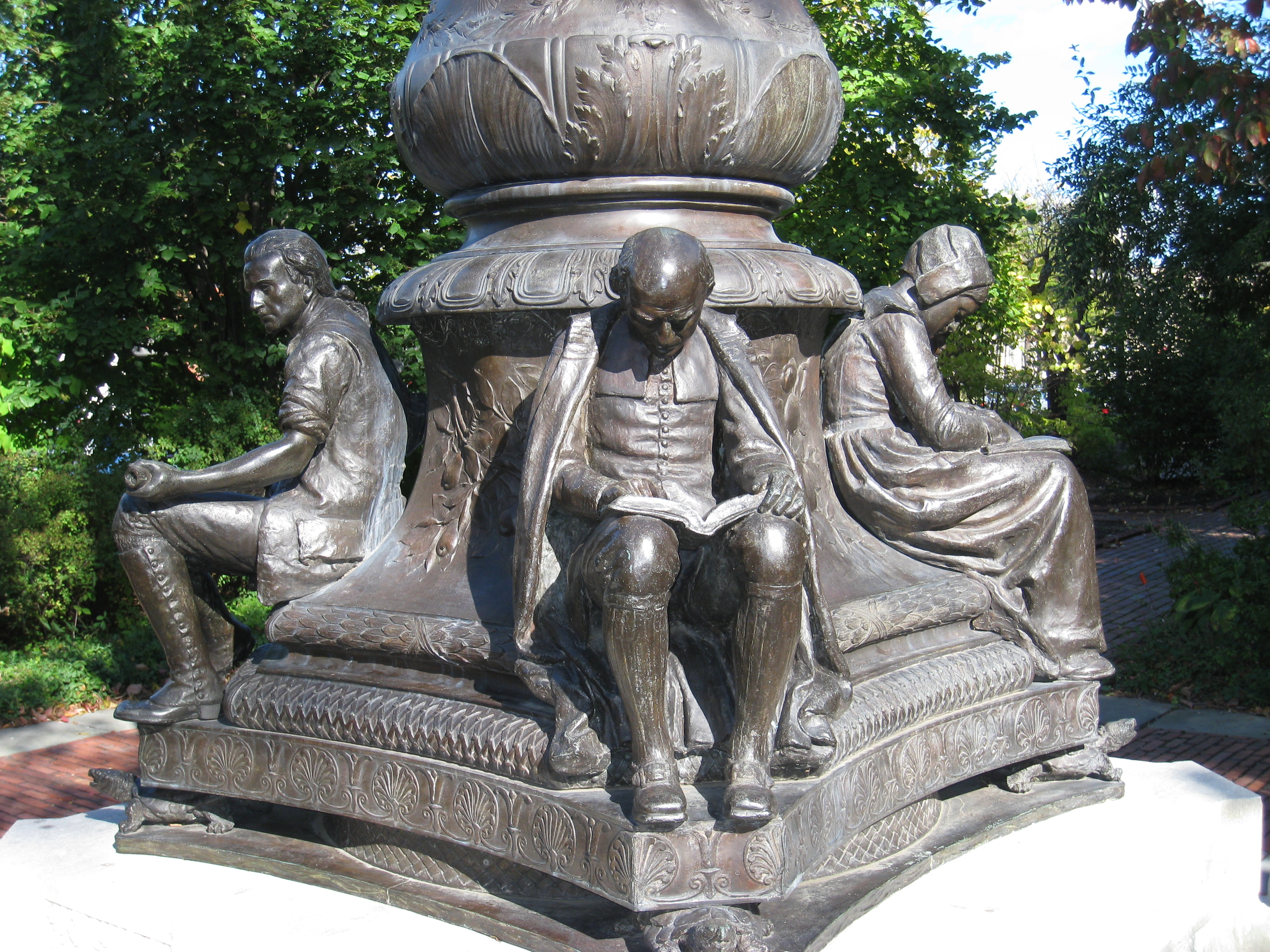
Robbins Memorial Flagstaff (1914) at the Arlington Center Historic District in Arlington, Massachusetts

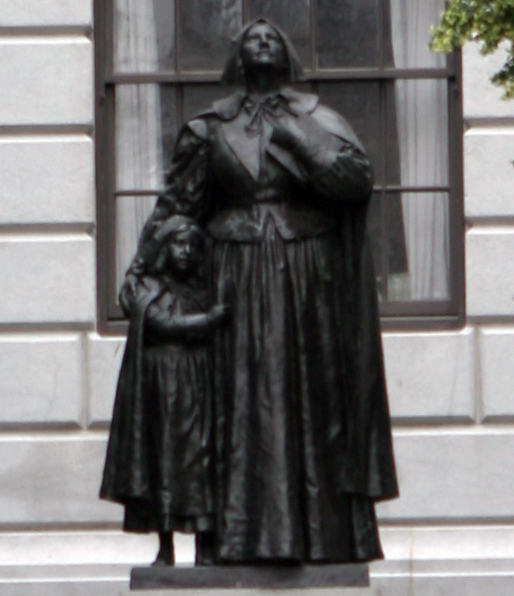
Anne Hutchinson (1915, dedicated 1922) at the Massachusetts State House in Boston

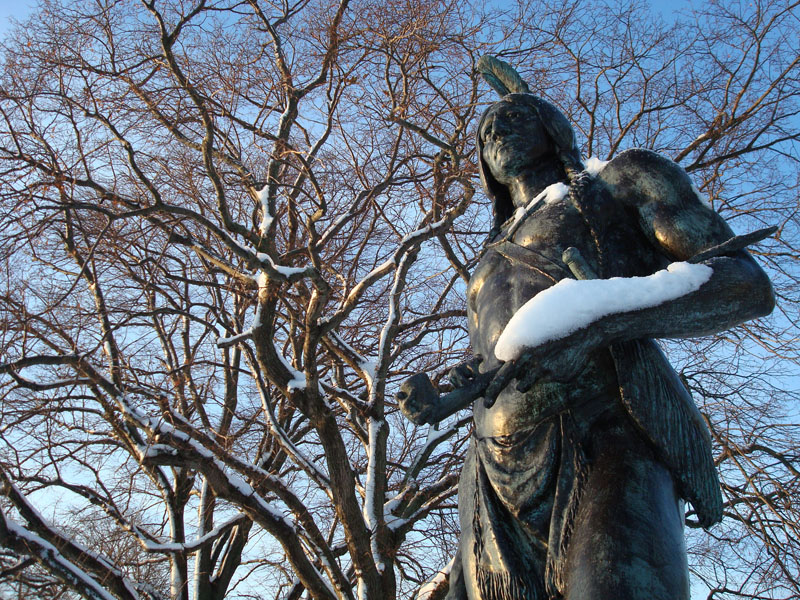
Massasoit (1920) opposite Plymouth Rock in Plymouth, Massachusetts

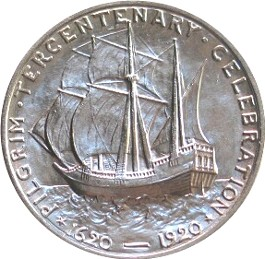
Pilgrim Tercentenary half dollar (1920)

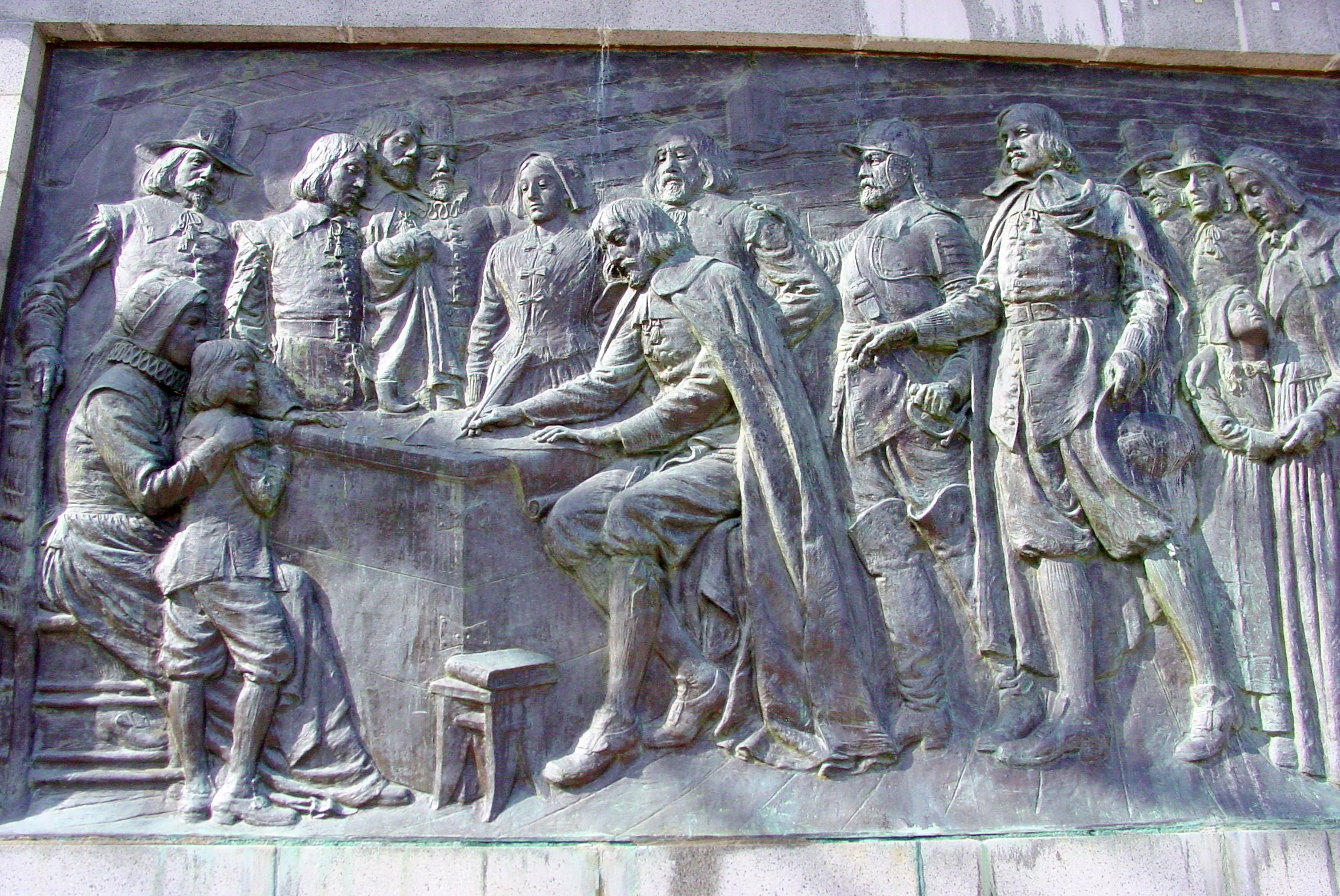
Signing the Mayflower Compact (1921) in Provincetown, Massachusetts

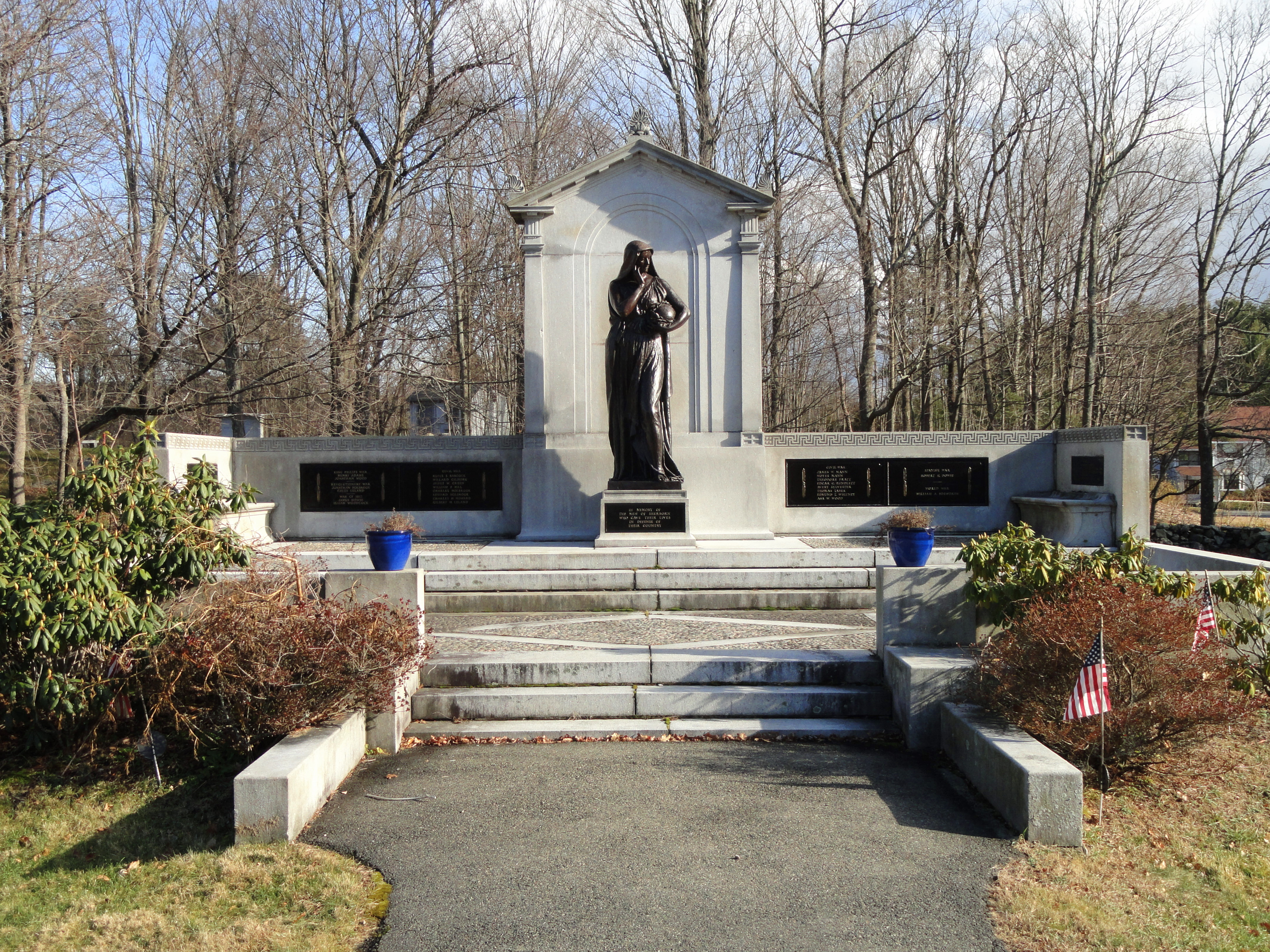
Memory (1924) at the Sherborn War Memorial in Sherborn, Massachusetts

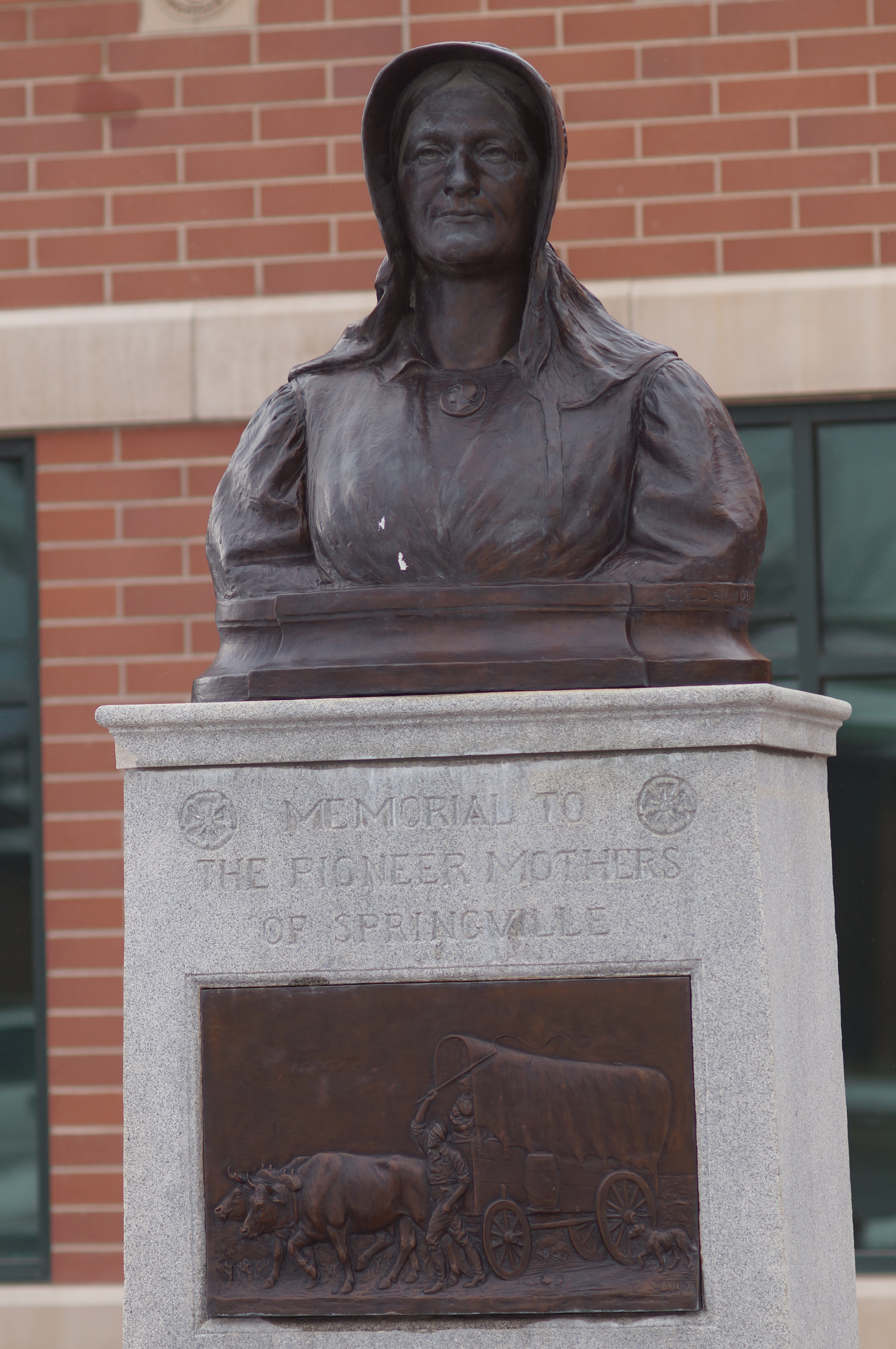
Memorial to the Pioneer Mothers of Springville (1932) in Springville, Utah

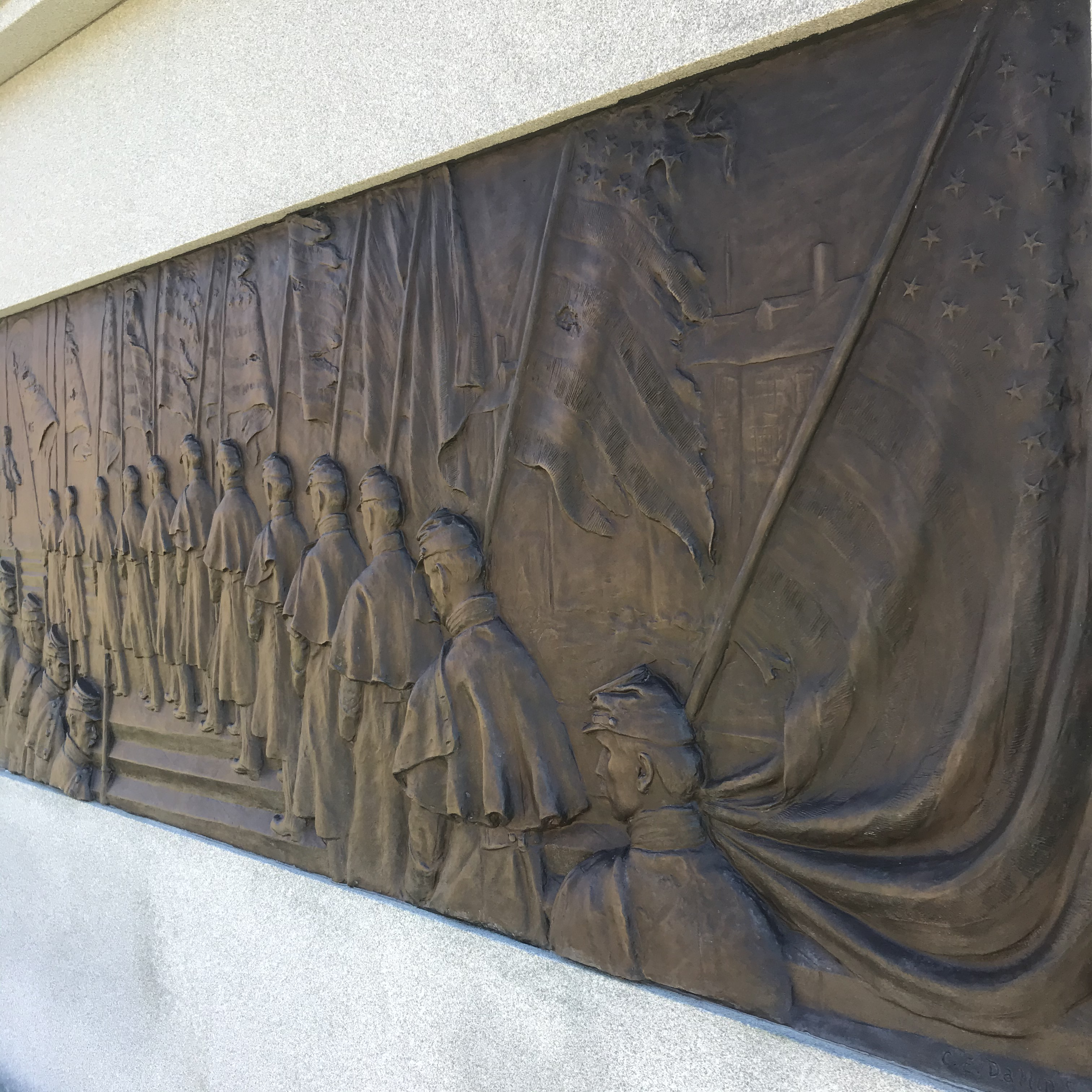
Woburn Return of the Troops

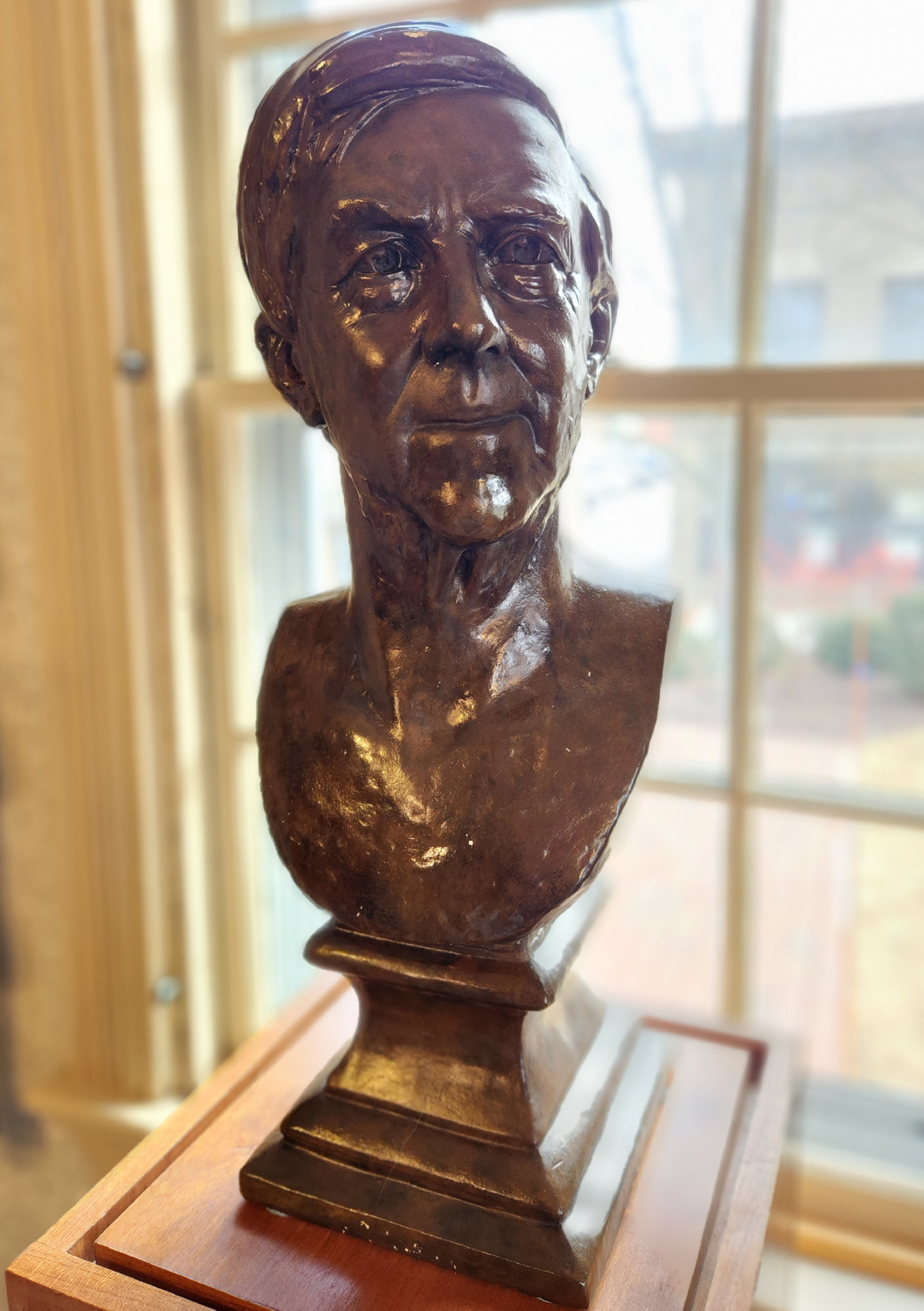
Oliver Wendell Homes

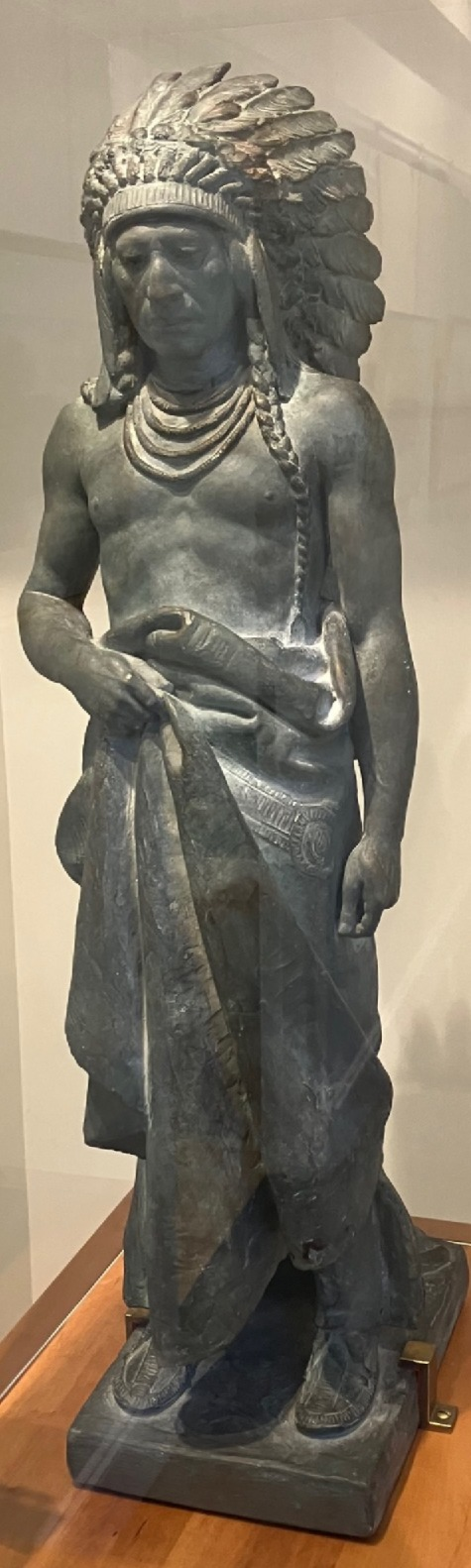
Standing Elk (1920) Topsfield, Massachusetts

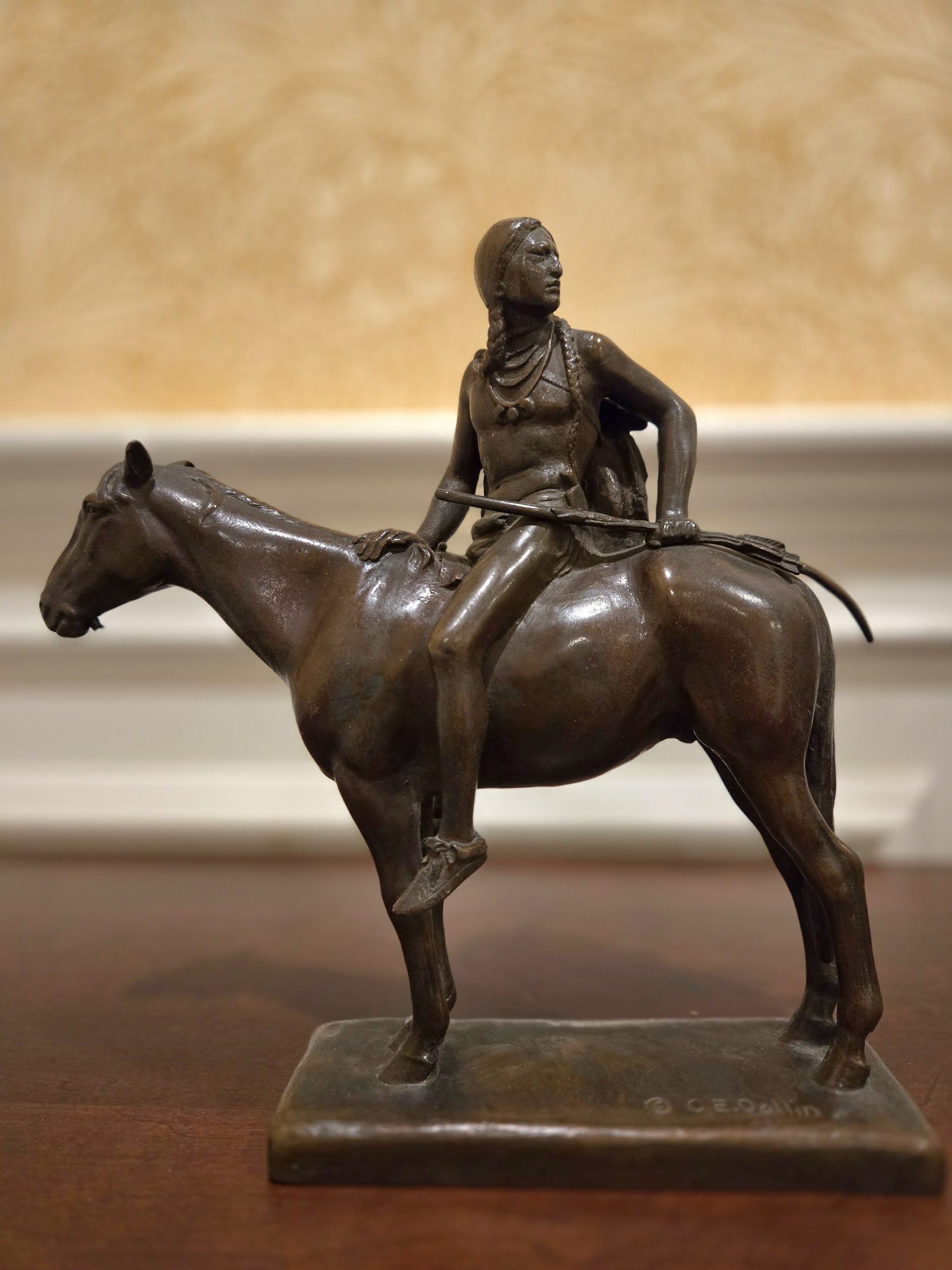
On the Warpath (1920)

== See also ==
- List of sculptures by Cyrus Dallin in Massachusetts
