= Brigham Young Monument =

Sculpture by Cyrus Edwin Dallin

Coordinates: 40.76956°N 111.89109°W

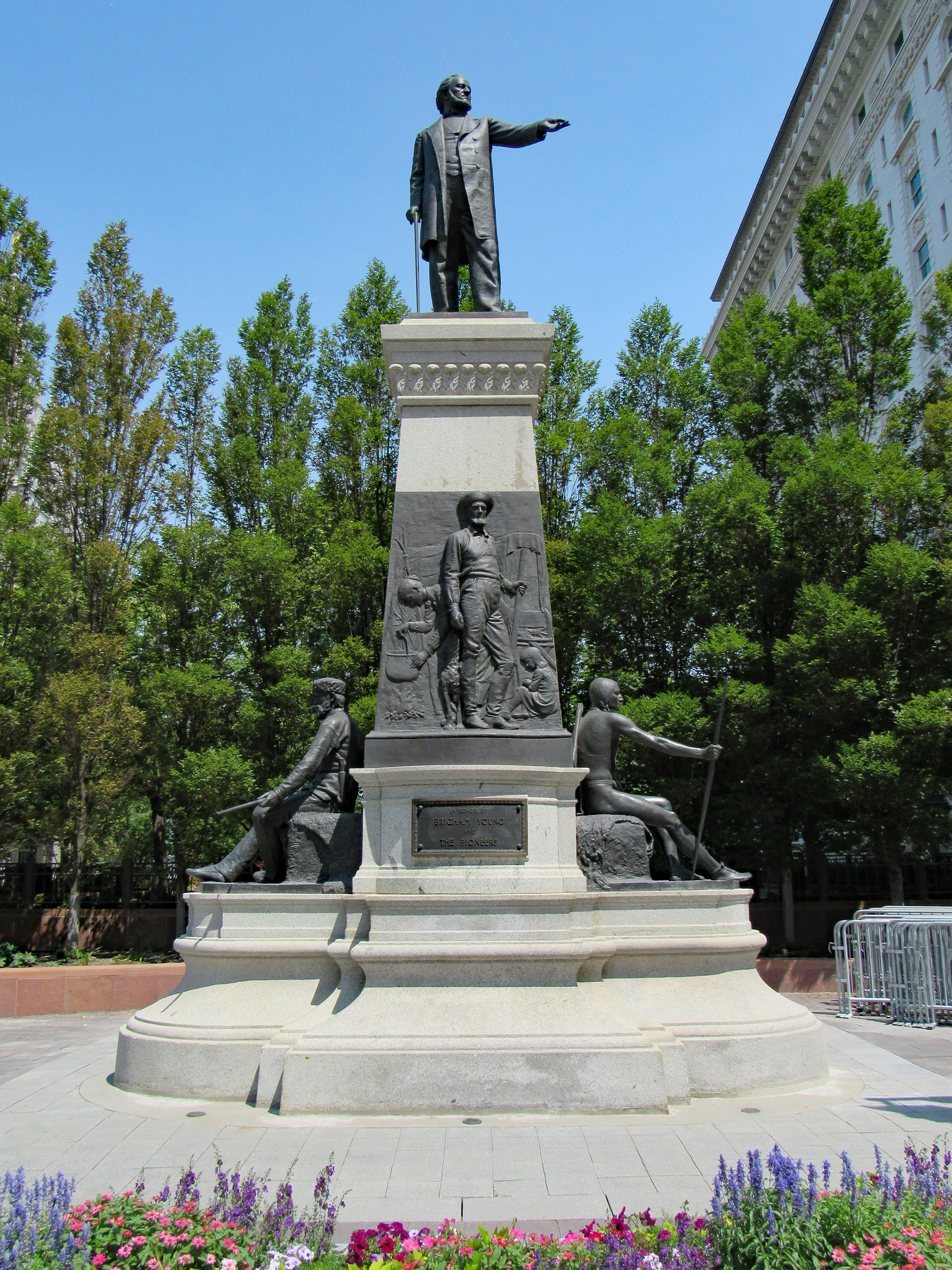
- Interactive map of Brigham Young Monument
- Type: Statue
- Material: Bronze sculpture
- Dedicated date: Brigham Young

The Brigham Young Monument (or Pioneer Monument) is a bronzed historical monument located on the north sidewalk of the intersection at Main and South Temple Streets of Salt Lake City, Utah. It was erected in honour of pioneer-colonizer, Utah governor, and LDS Church president Brigham Young who led the Mormon pioneers into the Utah Territory in 1847. The base of the twenty-five-foot monument has the bronze figure of a Native American facing east and that of a bearded fur trapper facing west, both of which preceded the Mormon settlers. On the south side is a bronze bas-relief of a pioneer man, woman, and child. A bronze plaque on the north side has a list of the pioneers who arrived in the Salt Lake Valley on July 24, 1847. It previously also listed their equipment, as well as denoting those who were still living as of the original placement. The original plaque was replaced in 2026.

The Brigham Young Monument was first displayed at the Chicago World's Fair in 1893. It stood briefly afterwards on Temple Square and was then transferred centering the intersection of Main and South Temple streets in 1897, where it stood until 1993, when it was moved a few yards north to its present location.

In 1914 sculptor Cyrus Dallin revisited the motif of the sitting figures in the execution of the Robbins Memorial Flagstaff in Arlington, Massachusetts. That piece includes an Indigenous American woman and a Patriot on alert.

The monument is the work of Cyrus Edwin Dallin.

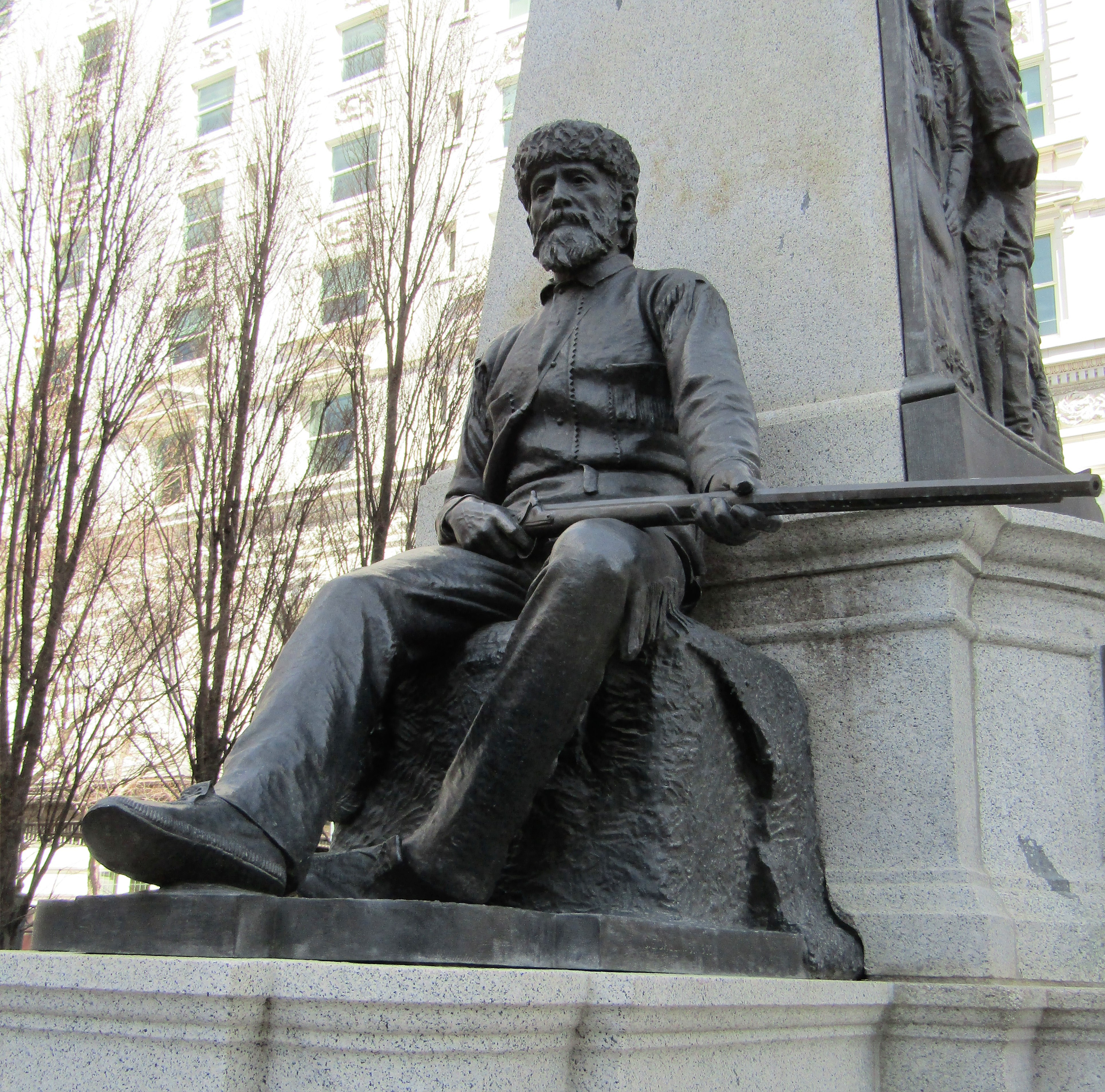
Frontiersman (angle view)

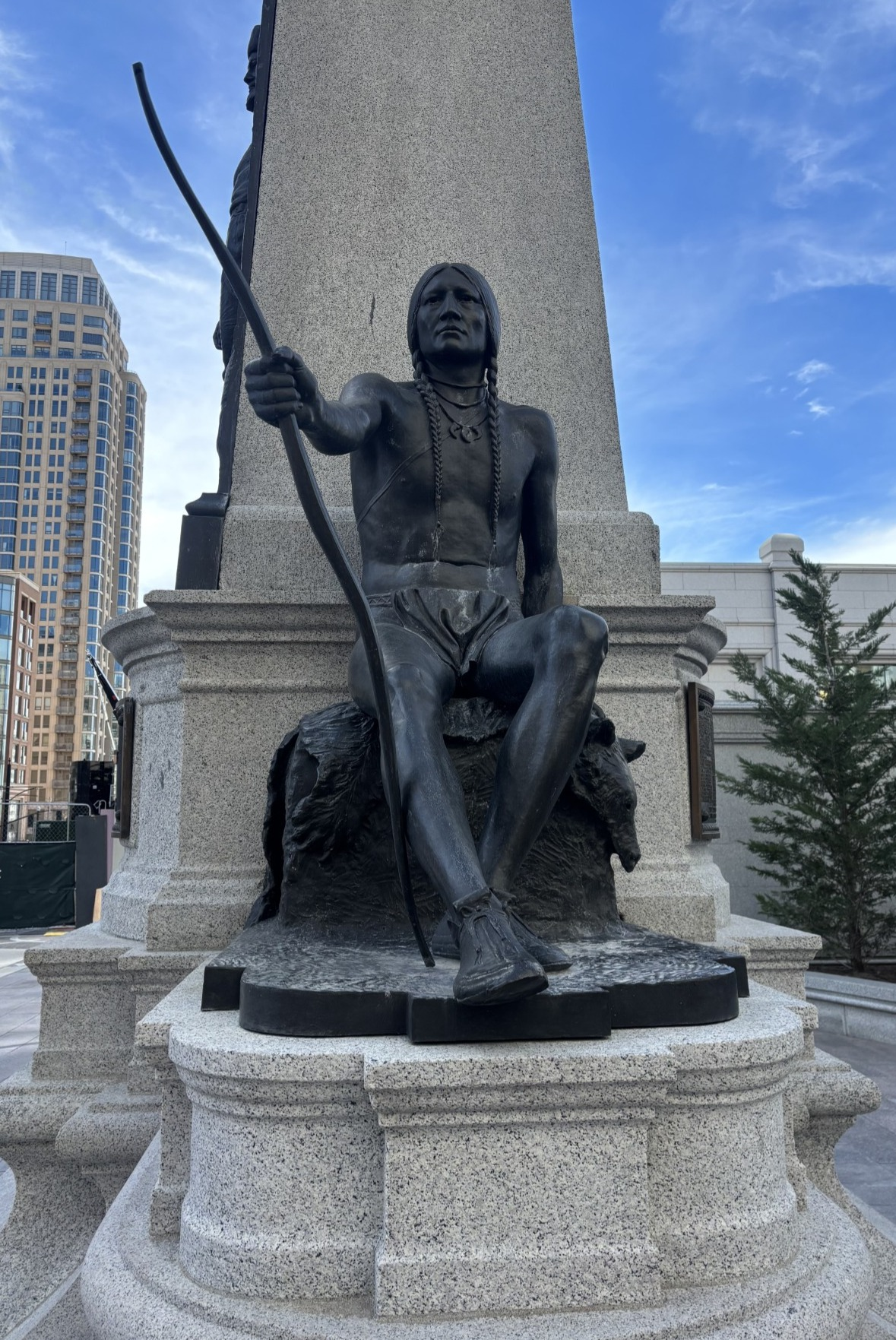
Indigenous Person

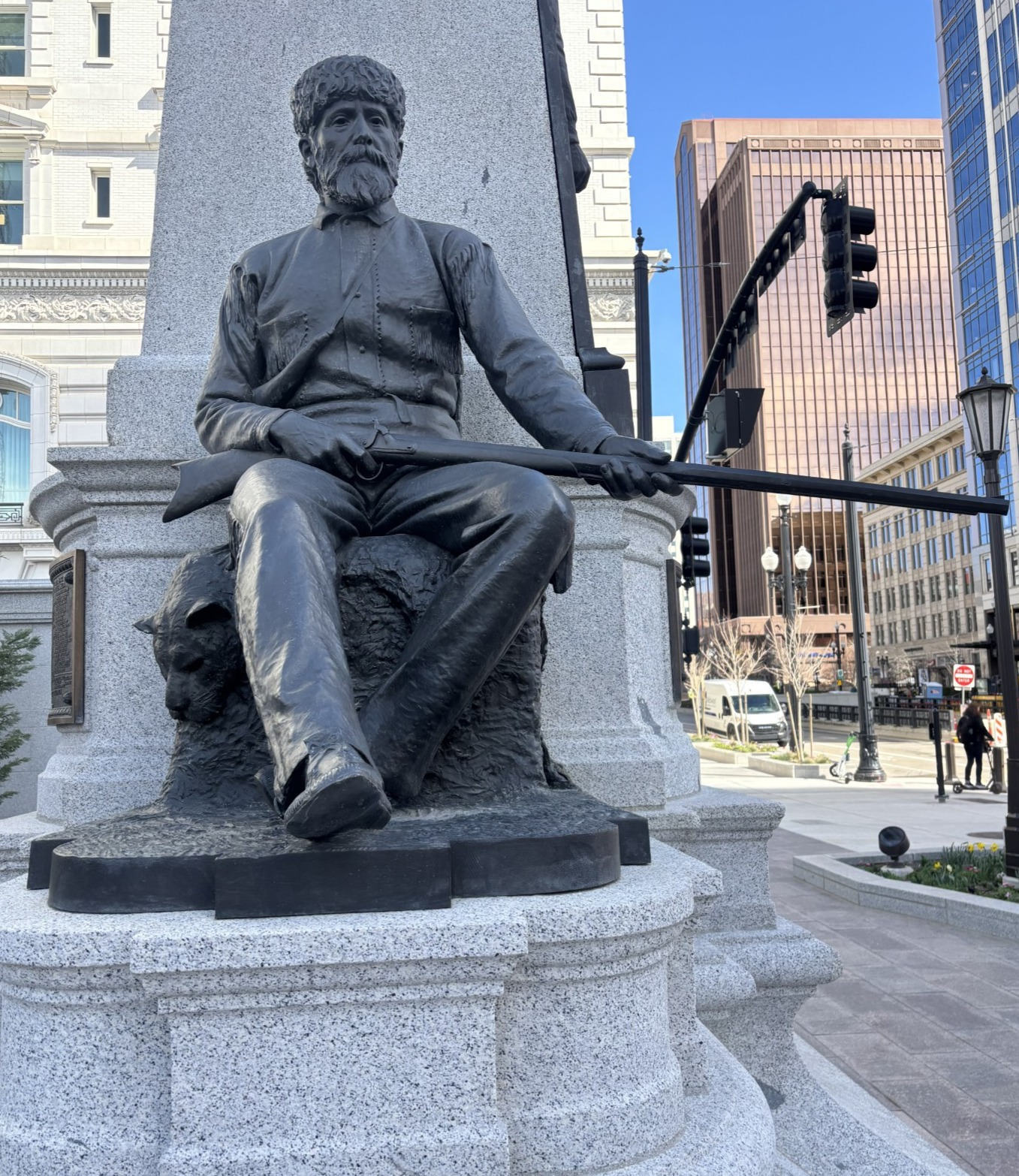
Frontiersman

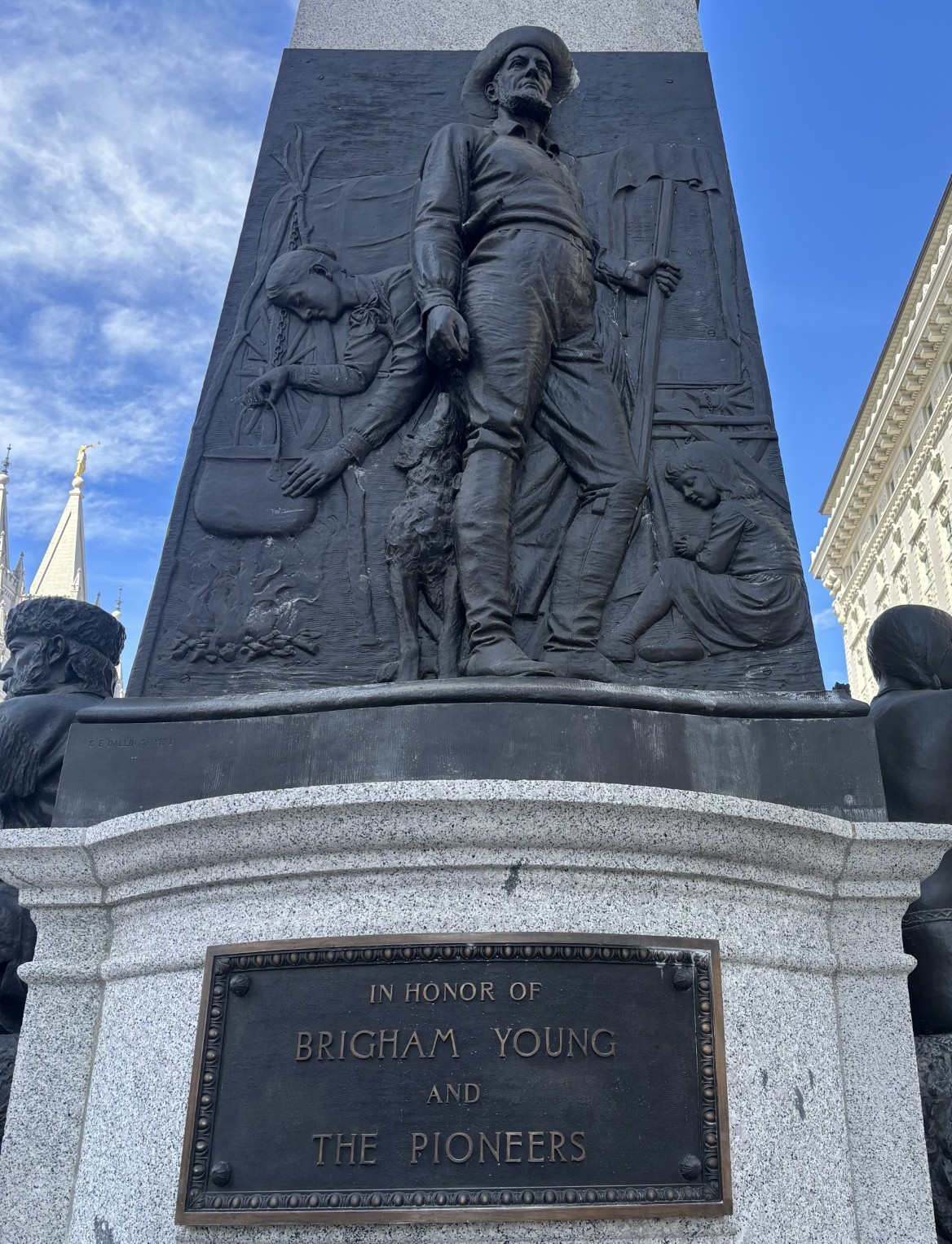
Pioneer Relief Panel

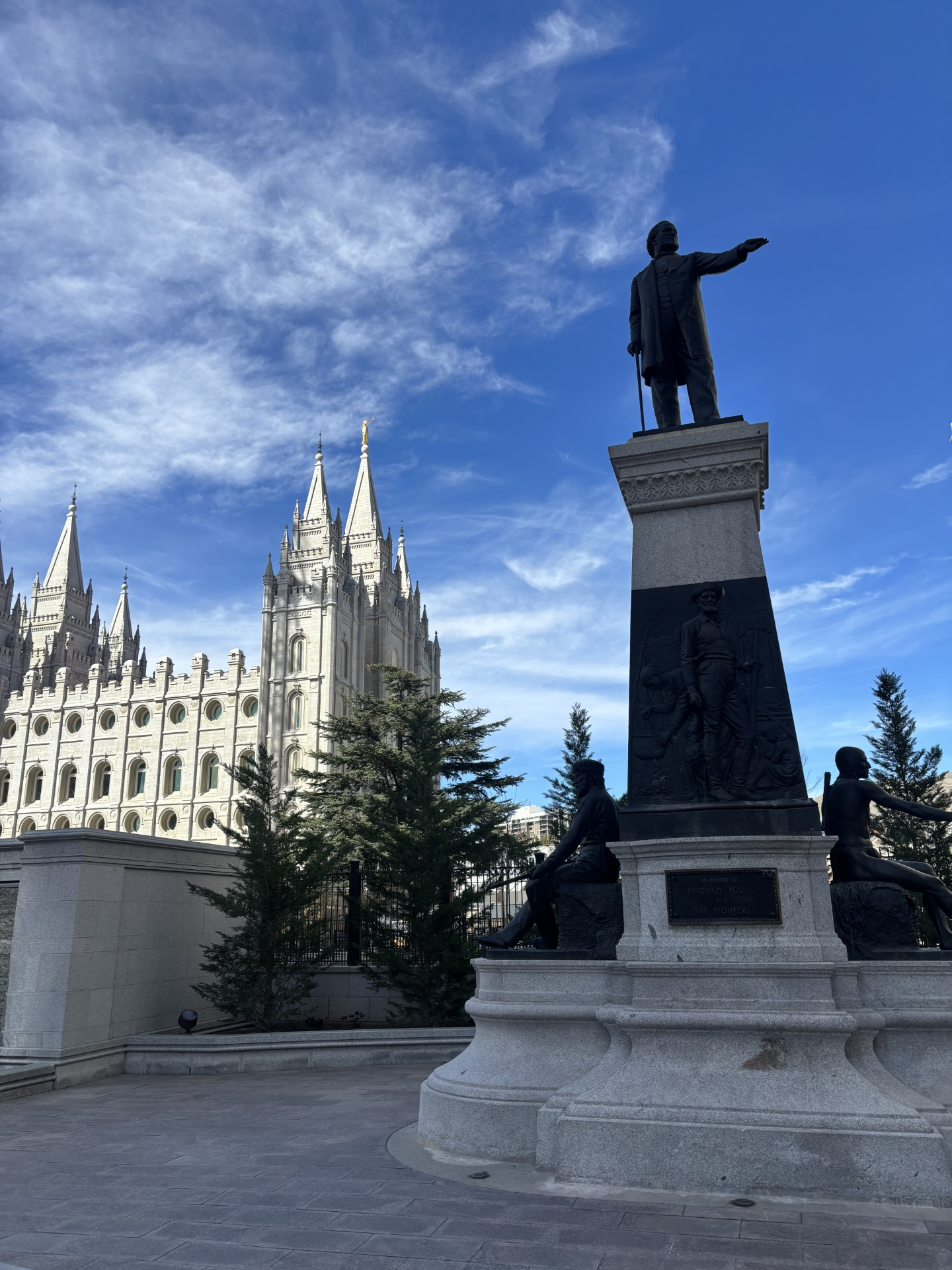
Monument with Salt Lake Temple in background

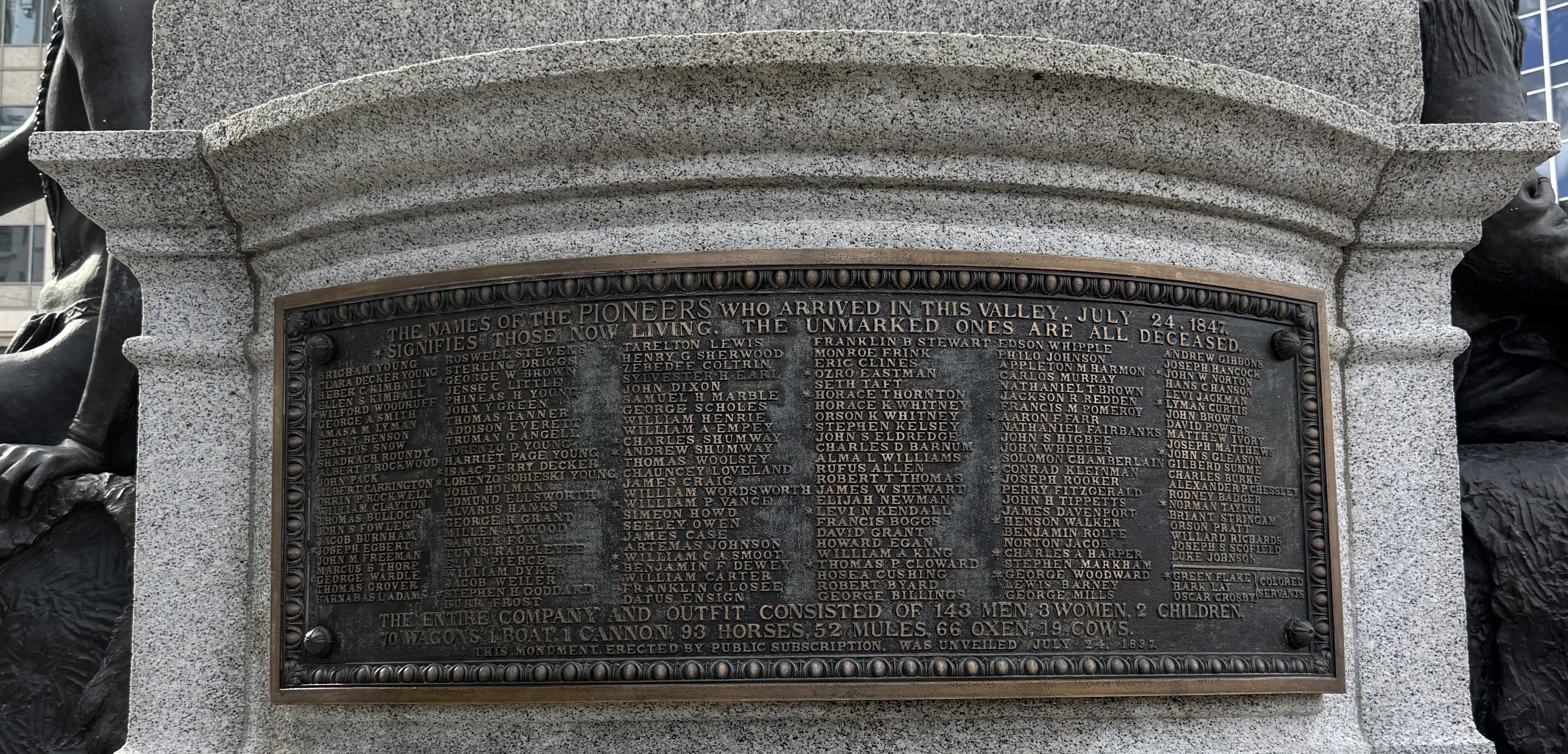
Original plaque listing early Mormon pioneers and their equipment.
Updated 2026 Plaque listing names of the pioneers

== See also ==
- Mormon handcart pioneers
- Mormon Trail
- Pioneer Day (Utah)
- Utah...This Is the Place
- Cyrus Dallin Art Museum
- Robbins Memorial Flagstaff
