= Ephraim Cutter House =

Historic house in Massachusetts, United States

- U.S. National Register of Historic Places
- U.S. Historic district – Contributing property
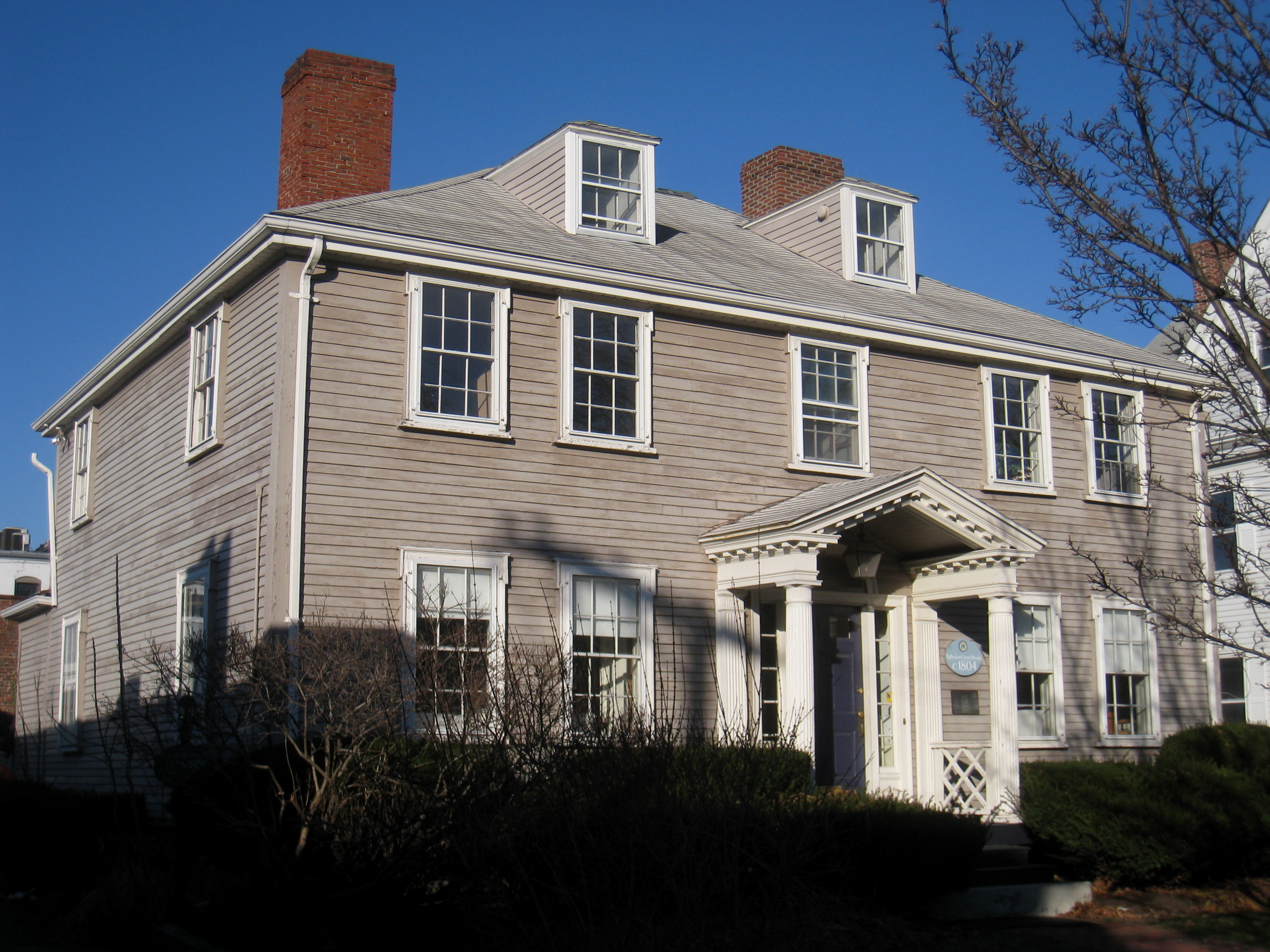

- Location within Massachusetts Location within the United States
- Location: 4 Water St., Arlington, Massachusetts
- Coordinates: 42°24′59″N 71°9′17″W
- Built: 1804
- Architect: Cutter, Ephraim
- Architectural style: Federal
- Part of: Arlington Center Historic District (ID85002691)
- NRHP reference No.: 78000430

Significant dates
- Added to NRHP: March 29, 1978
- Designated CP: September 27, 1985

The Ephraim Cutter House is a historic house at 4 Water Street in Arlington, Massachusetts. Built about 1804 by one of the town's leading mill owners, it is one of Arlington's few surviving Federal period houses. It was listed on the National Register of Historic Places in 1978, and included in an expansion of the Arlington Center Historic District in 1985.

== Description and history ==
The Ephraim Cutter House stands on a side street in Arlington Center, on the west side of Water Street just behind the commercial buildings facing Massachusetts Avenue. It is a two-story wood-frame structure, with a dormered hip roof and clapboarded exterior. Its windows are rectangular sash, topped by delicate eared moulding. The main entrance is at the center of the five-bay front facade, sheltered by a gabled porch. The entrance surround includes sidelight windows and a half-round fan. The porch is supported by fluted columns and pilasters rising to an entablature on the sides, and has a modillioned eave. The porch is likely a later 19th century addition.

The house was built about 1804 for Ephraim Cutter, owner of Arlington's largest mill. The house is one of the few surviving Federal period buildings in Arlington, and is notable among those for its elaborate entrance portico. The house was built facing Massachusetts Avenue, but was moved back and rotated ninety degrees to face Water Street in 1915.

== See also ==
- National Register of Historic Places listings in Arlington, Massachusetts
