= Arlington Center Historic District =

Historic district in Massachusetts, United States

- U.S. National Register of Historic Places
- U.S. Historic district
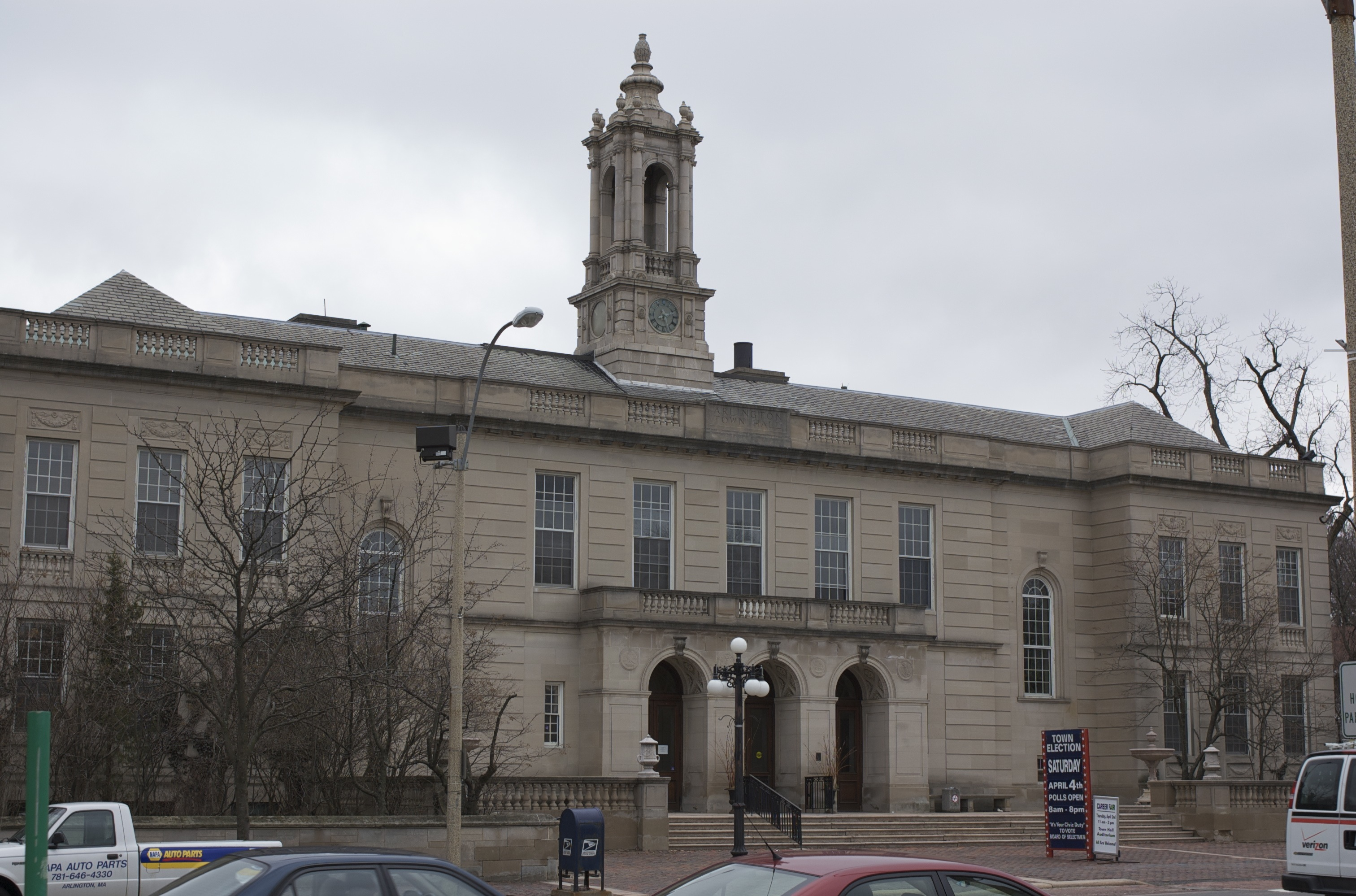
- Arlington Town Hall

- Location within Massachusetts Location within the United States
- Location: Arlington, Massachusetts
- Coordinates: 42°24′53″N 71°9′21″W
- Architect: Multiple
- Architectural style: Late 19th And 20th Century Revivals, Gothic Revival, Federal
- MPS: Arlington MRA (AD)
- NRHP reference No.: 74000361 (original); 85002691 (increase)

Significant dates
- Added to NRHP: July 18, 1974
- Boundary increase: September 27, 1985

The Arlington Center Historic District includes the civic and commercial heart of Arlington, Massachusetts. It runs along the town's main commercial district, Massachusetts Avenue, from Jason Street to Franklin Street, and includes adjacent 19th- and early 20th-century residential areas roughly bounded by Jason Street, Pleasant Street, and Gray Street. The district was listed on the National Register of Historic Places in 1974.

The oldest house in the district is the c. 1740 Jason Russell House. The town's Old Burying Ground is located on Pleasant Street; its oldest marked grave dates to 1735. Paul Revere road past it on his historic ride warning of the impending arrival of British troops. Arlington was the scene of some of the worst fighting in the Battles of Lexington and Concord that started the American Revolutionary War in 1775. A number of the dead from both sides of that battle are interred there.

Arlington remained a small rural town until the middle of the 19th century. Before then it had a few mills (none of which have survived) located on Mill Brook, which runs just north of Massachusetts Avenue. Some of the housing associated with the mill workers survives in a densely packed residential area on Central Street. One of the finer houses from this period is the 1842 Gothic Revival Chase Wellington House at 16 Maple Street.

Most of the commercial, civic, and religious buildings in Arlington Center were built later in the 19th century or in the early years of the 20th. Prominent among them is the Classical Revival Robbins Memorial Town Hall, designed by R. Clipston Sturgis and built in 1912, and the adjacent Robbins Memorial Library, built in 1892 to a design by Cabot, Everett & Mead. In between them are gardens that were first designed by Sturgis and later redesigned in 1939 by the Olmsted Brothers firm. Two noteworthy sculptures by Cyrus Dallin can be found on the grounds including The Menotomy Hunter and The Robbins Memorial Flagstaff. The Cyrus Dallin Art Museum in the Jefferson Cutter House at 611 Massachusetts Avenue maintains the world's largest collection of Dallin's sculptures and paintings. Unusual is the octagonal Central Fire Station, which anchors the east end of the district, built in 1926 to a design by George Ernest Robinson.

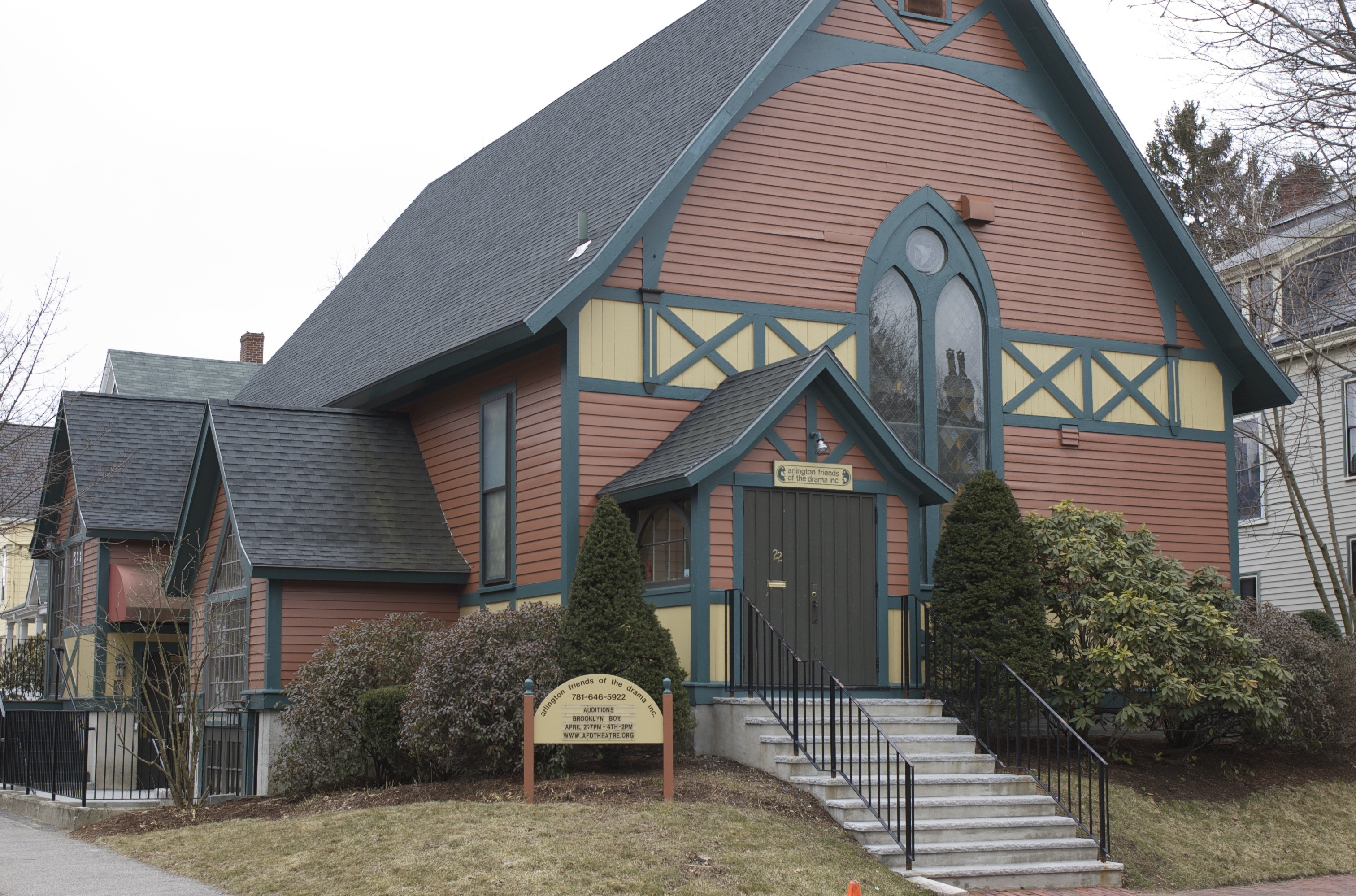
Arlington Friends of the Drama on Academy St.

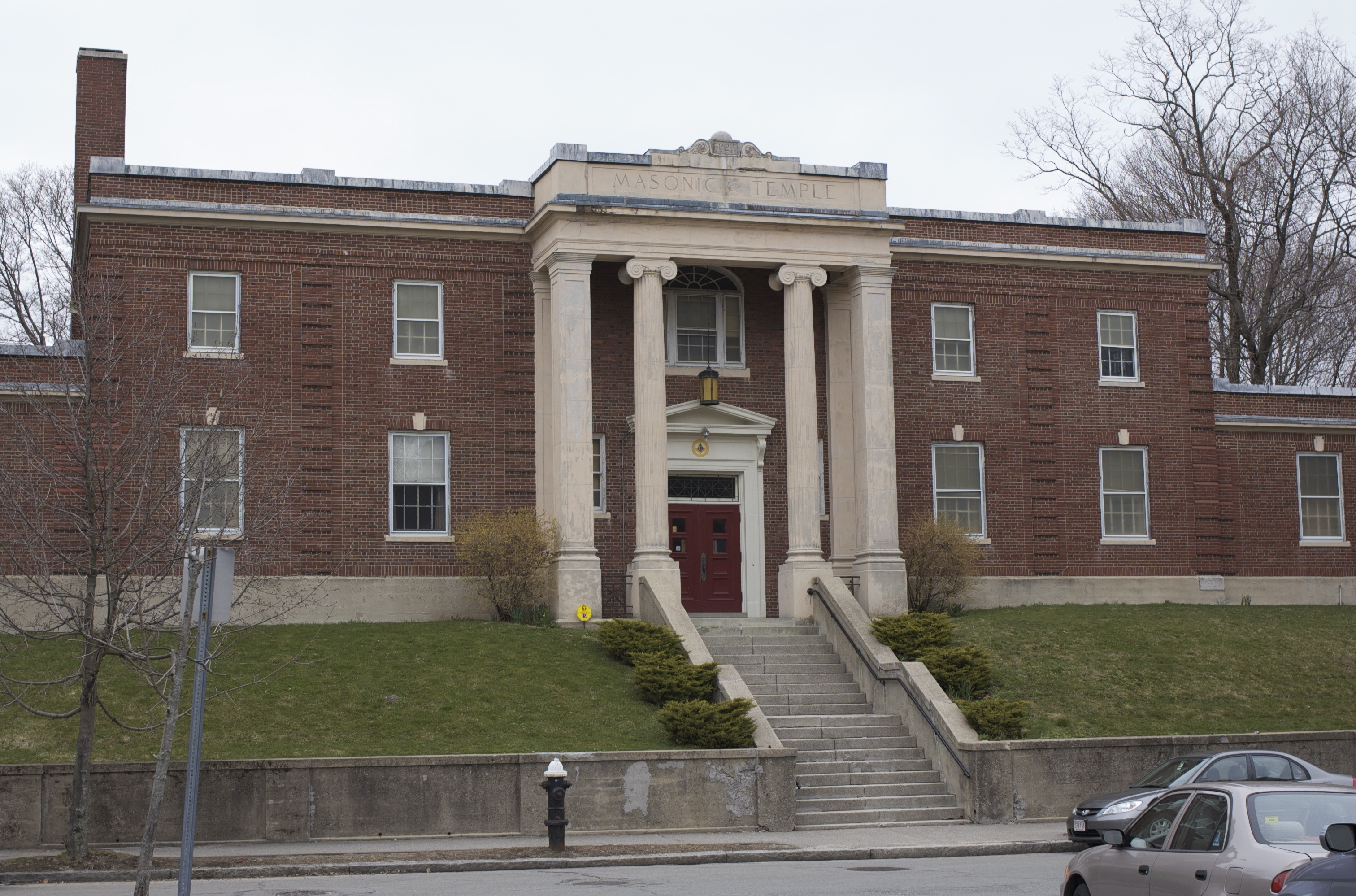
Masonic temple on Academy St.

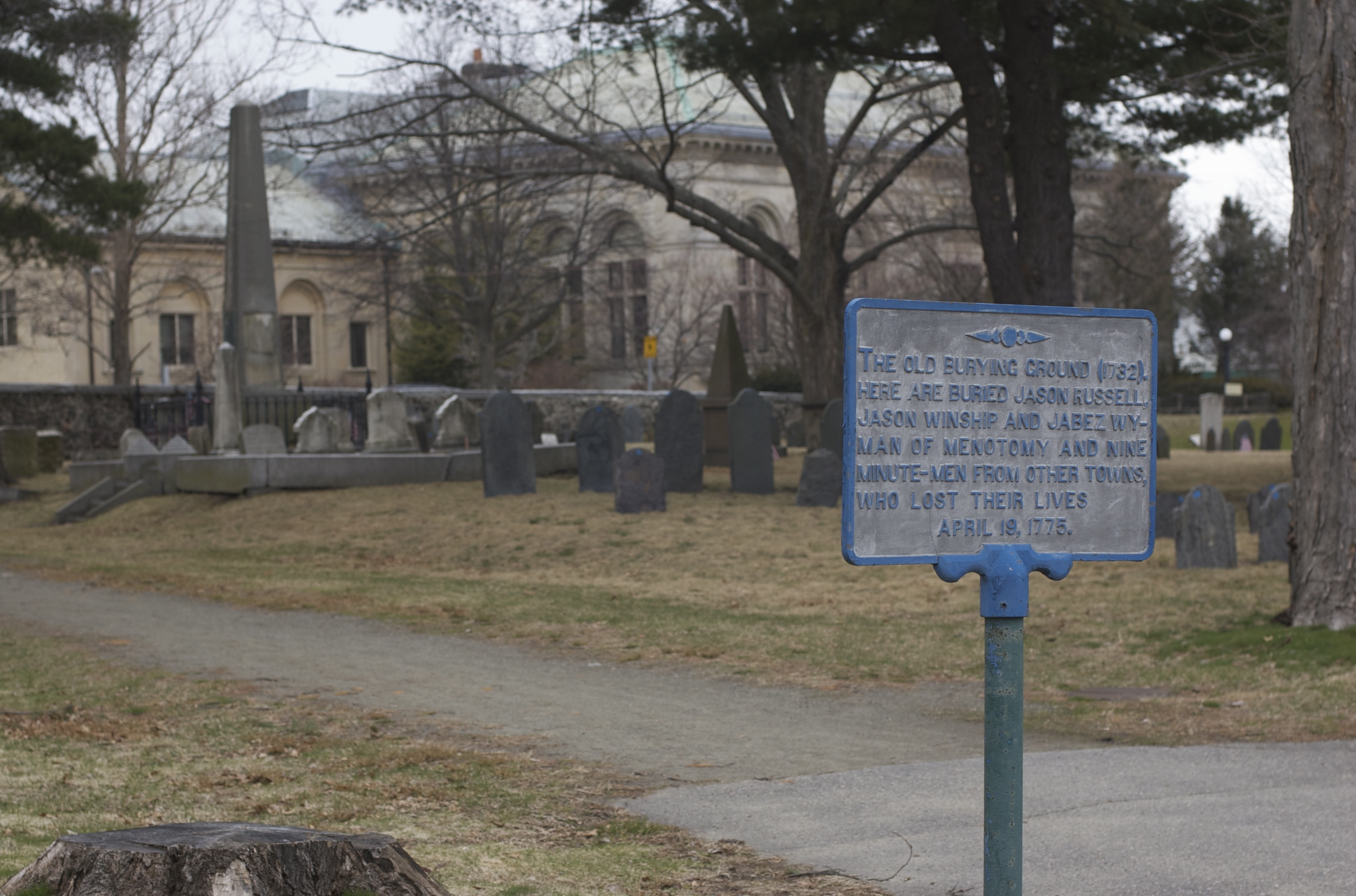
Old Burying Ground on Pleasant St.

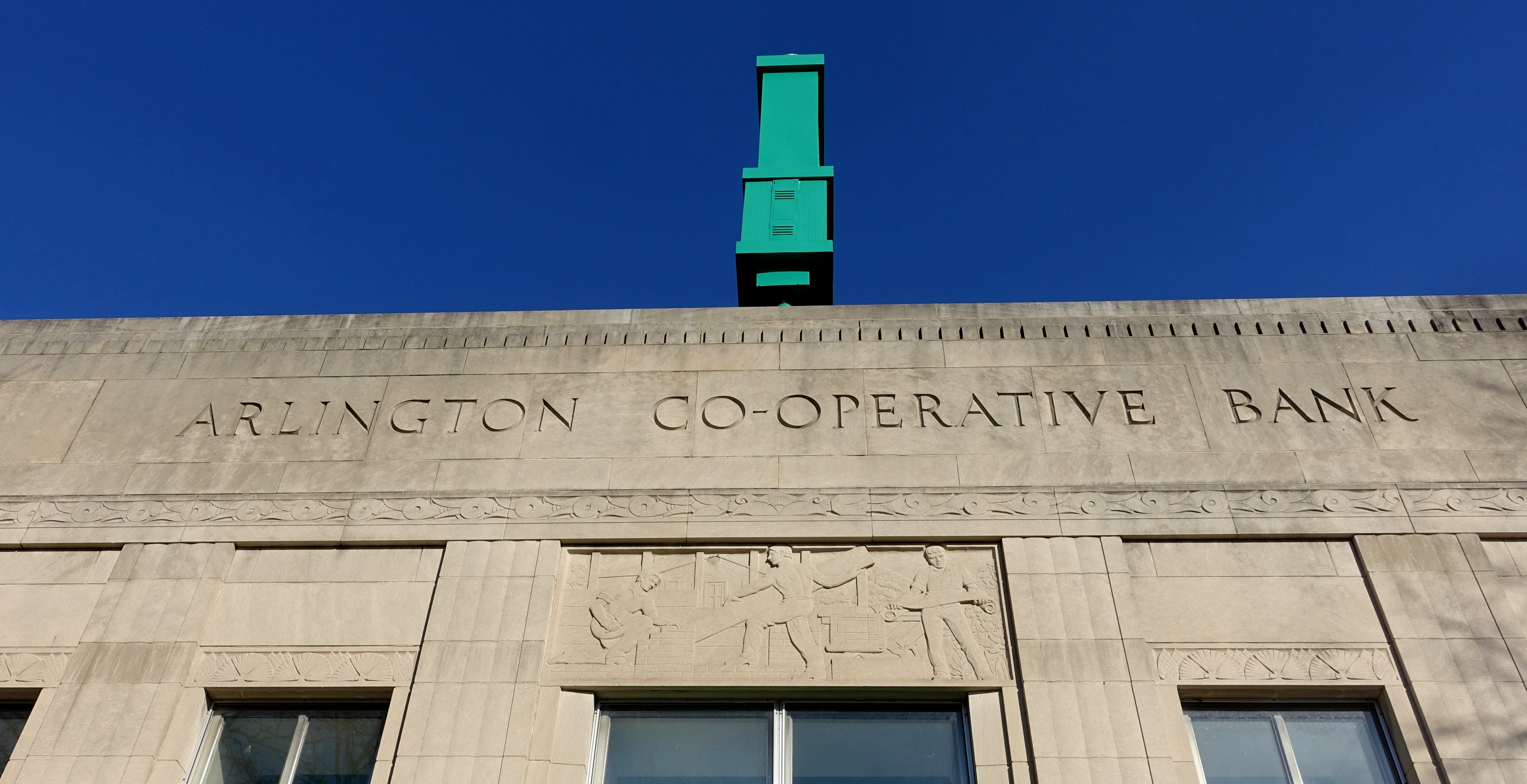
Arlington Co-Operative Bank Building, entry detail

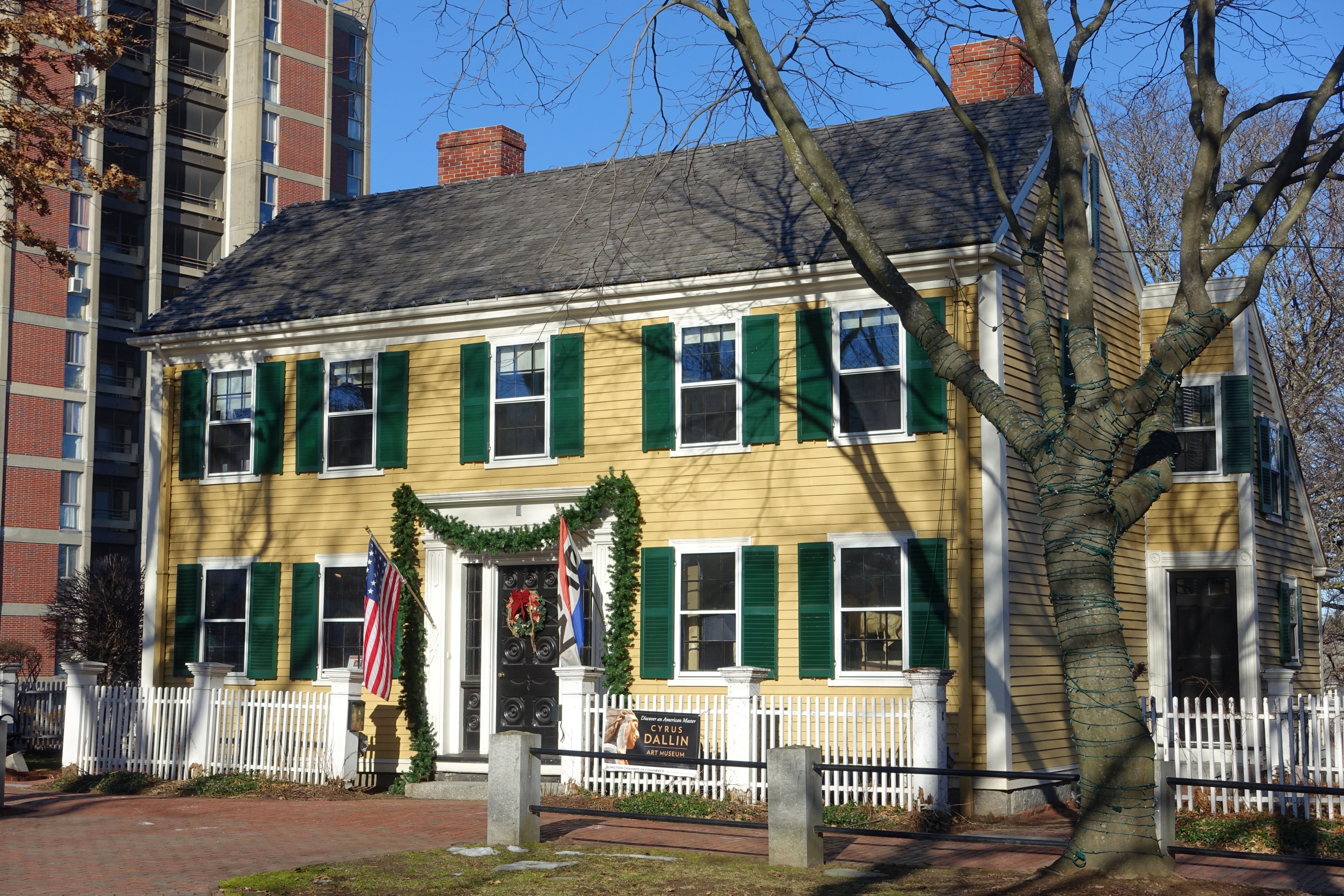
Cyrus Dallin Art Museum in the Jefferson Cutter House

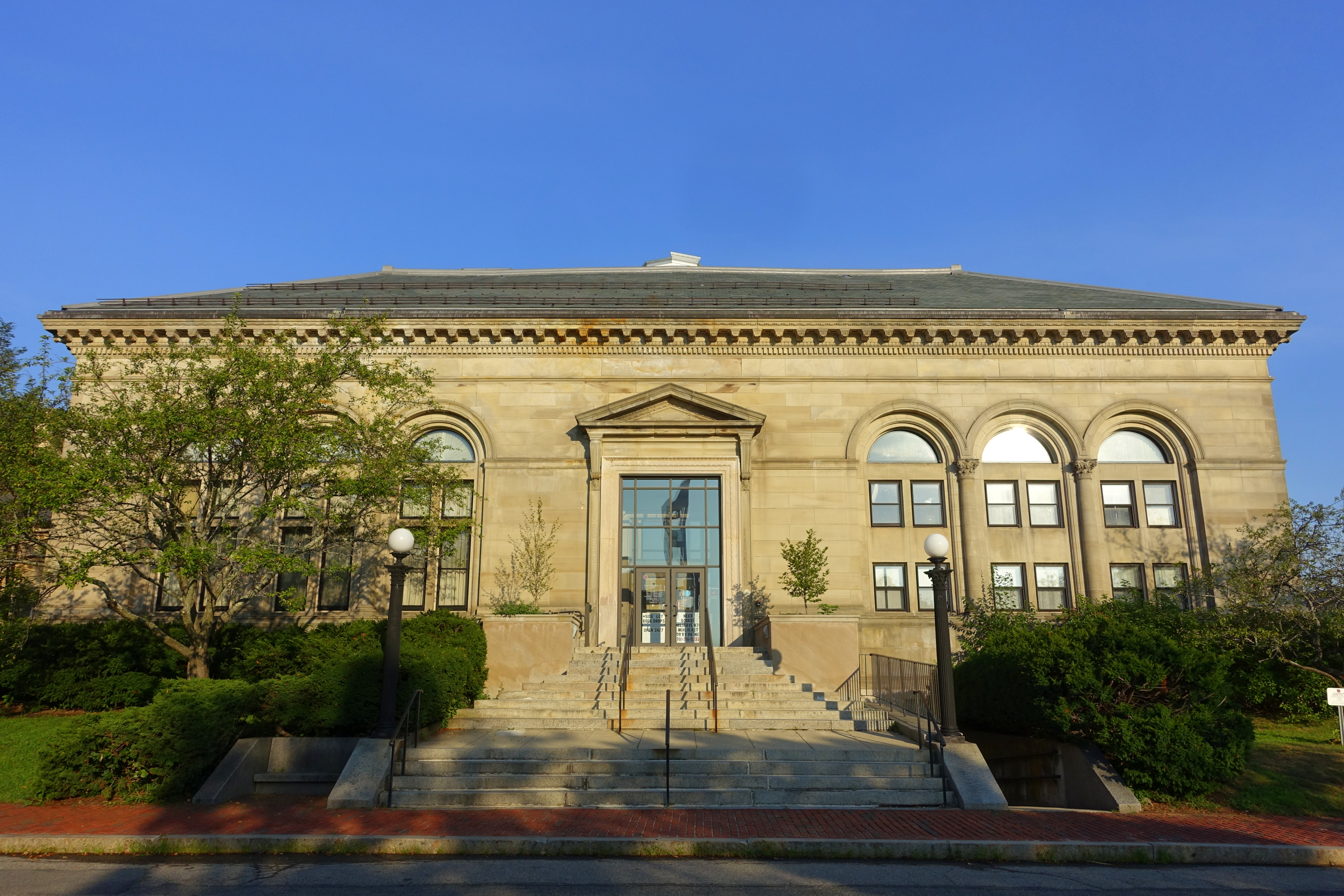
Robbins Library - Arlington, MA

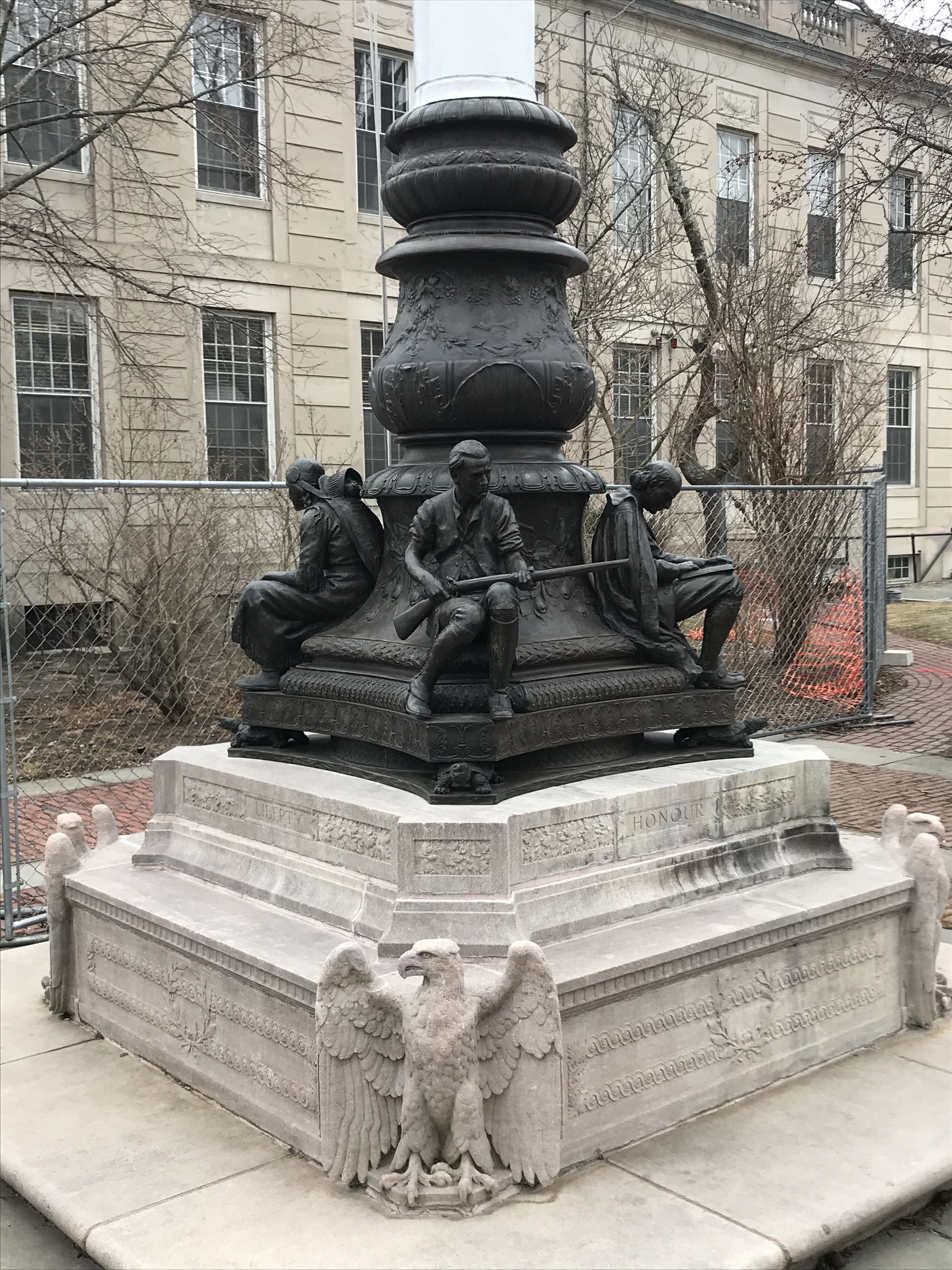
Robbins Memorial Flagstaff by Cyrus Dallin- Base with Sculptures

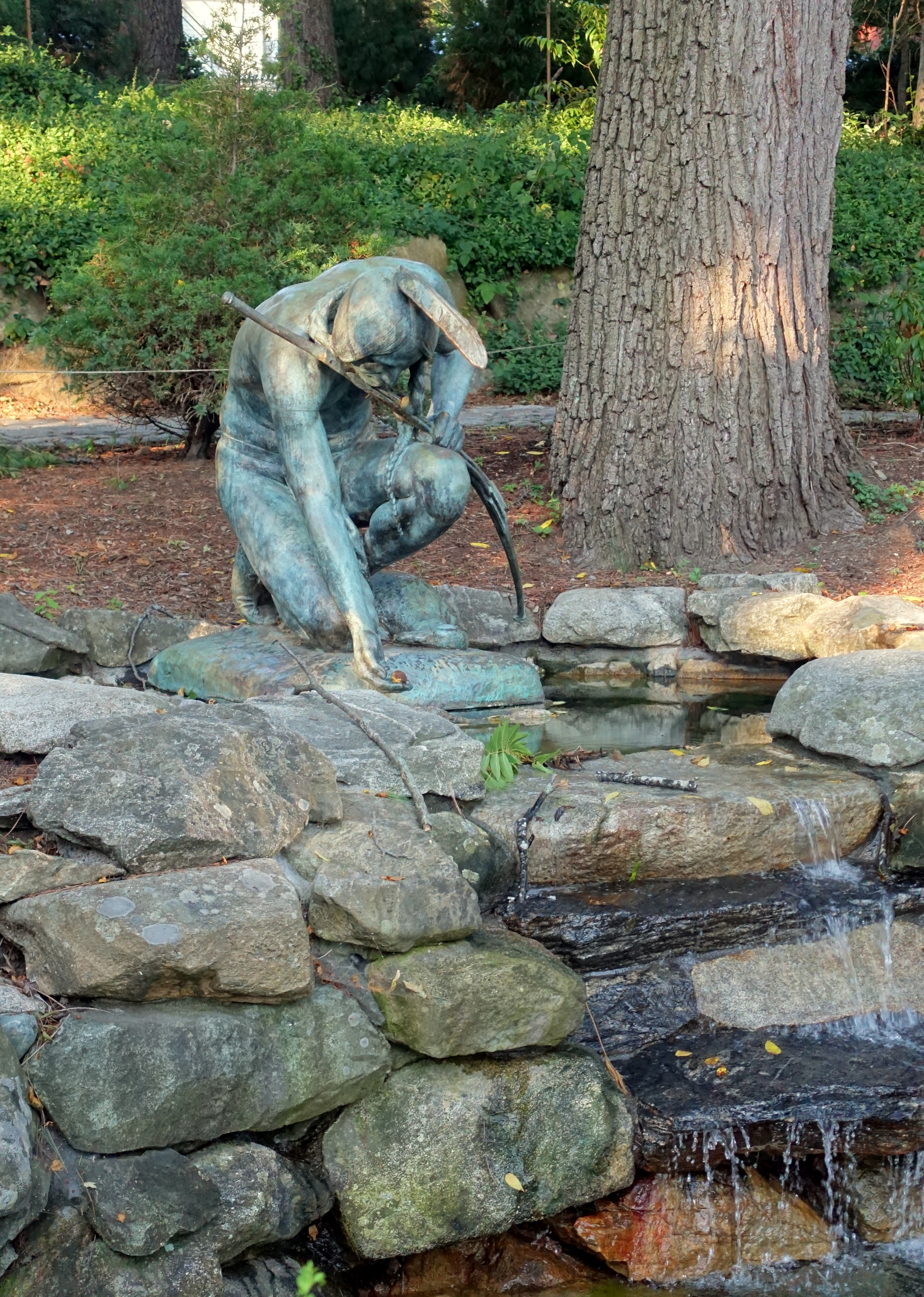
Menotomy Hunter Sculpture by Arlington resident Cyrus Dallin

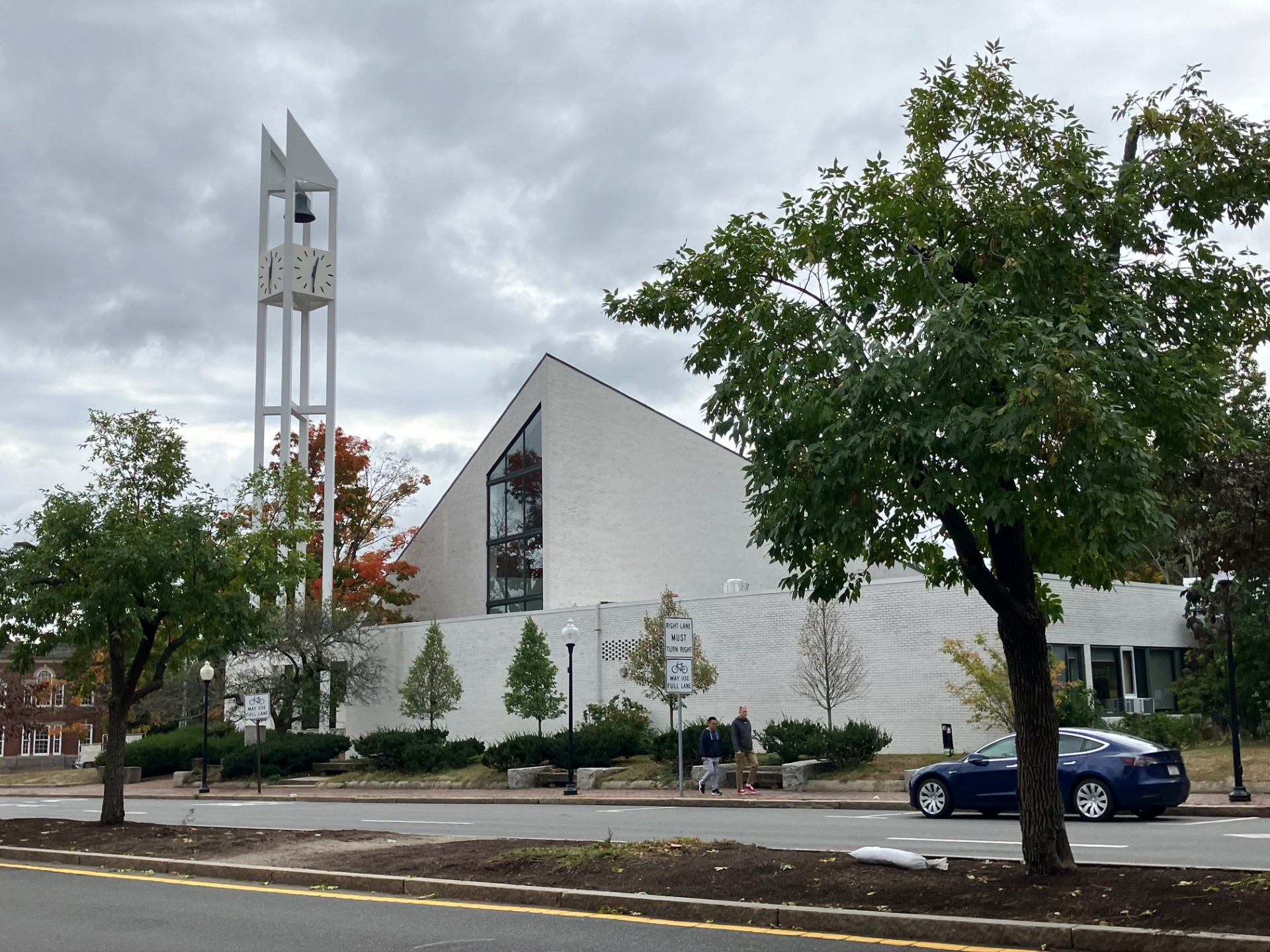
First Parish Church Arlington, Mass Exterior view showing main church and bell tower with clock

== See also ==
- Cyrus Dallin Art Museum
- Minuteman Bikeway
- Uncle Sam Memorial Statue
- Menotomy Hunter
- Robbins Memorial Flagstaff
- Soldiers' and Sailors' Monument (Arlington, Massachusetts)
- National Register of Historic Places listings in Arlington, Massachusetts
- First Parish Church, Arlington, Massachusetts
