= First Parish Church Parsonage =

Historic church in Massachusetts, United States

- U.S. National Register of Historic Places
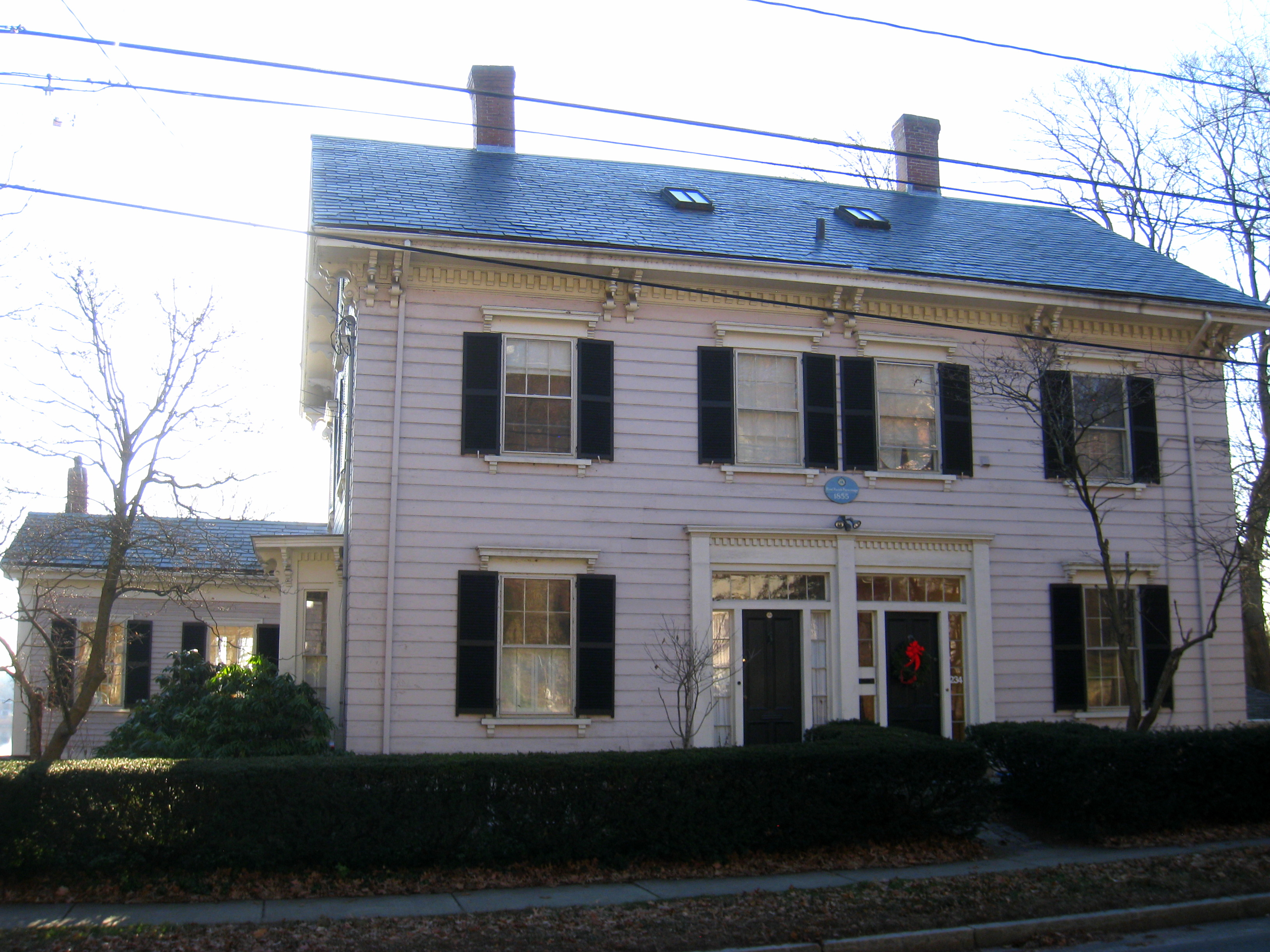

- Location within Massachusetts Location within the United States
- Location: 232–234 Pleasant Street, Arlington, Massachusetts
- Coordinates: 42°24′24″N 71°9′46″W
- Built: 1855
- Architectural style: Greek Revival, Italianate
- MPS: Arlington MRA
- NRHP reference No.: 85001032
- Added to NRHP: April 18, 1985

The First Parish Church Parsonage is a historic parsonage in Arlington, Massachusetts. The two story wood-frame house was built c. 1855 by Nathan Pratt, a wealthy local citizen. He gave half of the house for use as a parsonage for the First Parish Church, a role it served until the end of the 19th century. It was thereafter converted back into a single family residence. The double front entrance has typical Greek Revival features, including sidelight windows and pilasters, while the massing of the house, and its dentiled and bracketed cornice, are distinctly Italianate.

The house was listed on the National Register of Historic Places in 1985.

== See also ==
- National Register of Historic Places listings in Arlington, Massachusetts
