= Menotomy Hunter =

Bronze sculpture in Arlington, Massachusetts, U.S.

Coordinates: 42.415419°N 71.155907°W

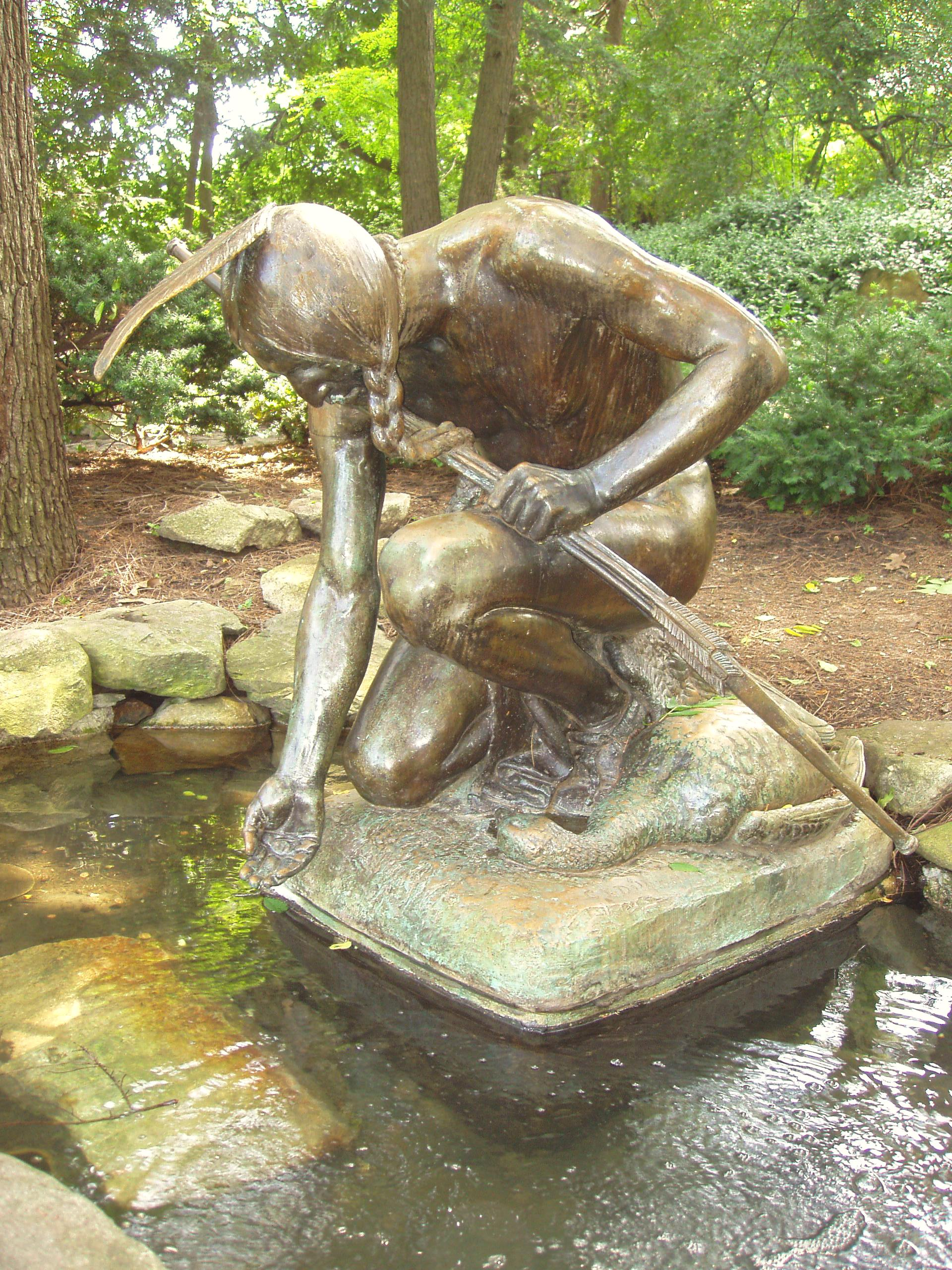
- Artist: Cyrus E. Dallin
- Completion date: 1911
- Medium: Bronze
- Subject: Menotomy Hunter
- Dimensions: (5 ft 0 in)
- Location: Arlington, Massachusetts, U.S.
- Owner: Town of Arlington, Massachusetts

The Menotomy Hunter (1911) is a sculpture by Cyrus E. Dallin in Arlington, Massachusetts, showing a Native American hunter pausing at a brook for a drink of water located in the Arlington Center Historic District. The sculpture resides at the center of the garden between the Robbins Memorial Town Hall and the Robbins Memorial Library, on a crest above a long, shallow reflecting pool. The man is equipped for a hunt, holding a bow. His catch for the day, a goose, rests by his foot.

The sculpture was commissioned by the family of the late Winfield Robbins. On the June 25, 1913, this sculpture and the nearby Robbins Memorial Flagstaff were dedicated and Dallin's speech included a passionate plea for renaming the town of Arlington as Menotomy after the historic significance of its largely vanished inhabitants.

The architect Richard Clipston Sturgis designed a fountain and grounds to fit the sculpture into a naturalized setting. In 1938, the Robbins sisters hired Frederick Law Olmsted of the Olmsted Brothers firm to redesign the gardens. The new design transformed the garden into a secluded, welcoming space that included a circular brick walk and an "informal, woodsy and rocky environment and a naturalistic planting as a background to the Indian". (Town Report, 1939.)

Like many of Dallin's iconic sculptures, this one too has seen its essence repurposed elsewhere. The statue has become one of Arlington's symbols. It is on the patch of the town's police officers and the fire department, and it is one of the logos used by the Spy Ponders, Arlington High School's athletic team.

The sculpture can be found outside the library at 700 Massachusetts Avenue in Arlington and about 200 yards (180 m) west of the Cyrus Dallin Art Museum.

== See also ==
- List of sculptures by Cyrus Dallin in Massachusetts
