= First Parish Church, Arlington Massachusetts =

Church building in Massachusetts, United States of America

Coordinates: 42°24′55.2″N 71°9′13.9″W

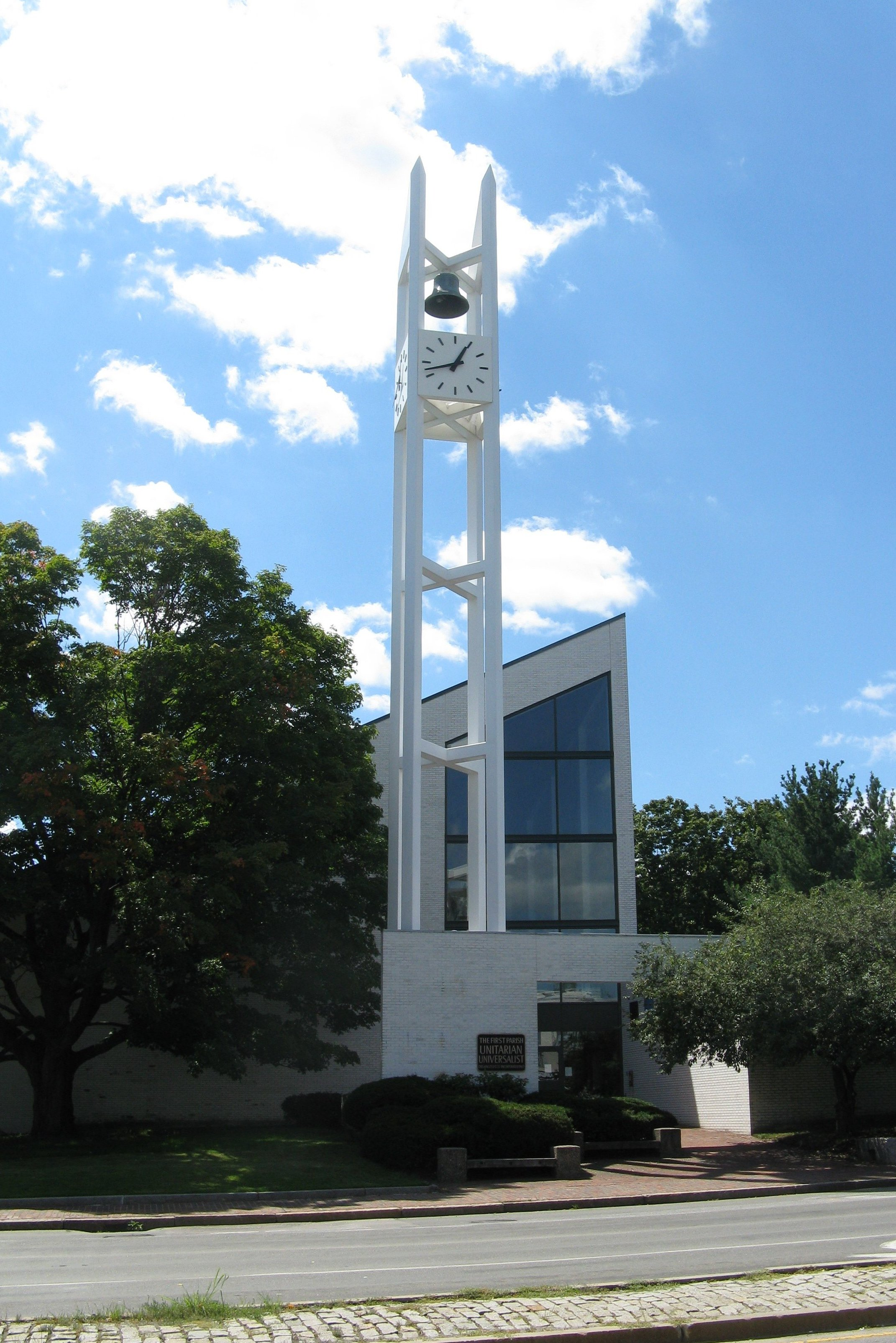
First Parish Church

First Parish Church in Arlington, Massachusetts is a Unitarian-Universalist congregation, which was founded in 1678 as First Parish in West Cambridge. It merged with the Arlington Universalist Congregation in 1962.

The Highrock Church building originally housed the Universalist church in Arlington. One of the congregations joined in 1961 with the formation of the Unitarian Universalist Association, with the Unitarian congregation at the corner of Pleasant and Massachusetts Avenue.

History of the Church's Meetinghouses

The Church has utilized five structures over its long history. The first meeting house building was erected in 1734. It was an unheated stone building that later would be moved down Pleasant Street and used as a residence.

To accommodate the growing congregation, the Parish built a second, and larger meeting house in 1804. The sale of 108 pews covered the $12,175 cost. This structure would remain unheated until 1820.

In 1841, yet another new, larger meeting house was built that contained an organ, but it would burn down on January 1, 1856, after serving only 15 years. And immediately, work began on replacing it with an impressive structure.

In 1857, at the cost of $19,000 the Parish completed the fourth meeting house. The awe-inspiring spire stood 181 feet tall and was the second highest in the state. The spire contained a 2000-pound bell, and a marble-faced clock paid for with town funding. A century later, in 1958 the parish added a religious education building located west of the meeting house.

March 1975 brought tragedy as a workman removing old paint ignited a fire that would bring down the steeple and damage the fourth meeting house to such a degree that the remnants had to be torn down. The parish received $1.5 million from insurance, but that would not be enough to rebuild a church in the likeness of its predecessor with beautiful woodwork with peg and groove construction.

The Parish hired architect Kenneth DeNisco to design the replacement, and he began attending services to gain a better understanding of the parish's needs. His proposed modernist design brought controversy. The main building was fireproof brick and It included a brick belltower that was ultimately converted into a steel tower. The church was also moved back 10 feet to protect a landmark Maple tree on the corner of Massachusetts Ave and Pleasant Street. Despite the disgruntlement of some who favored a more traditional structure the new design was approved by a vote of 94 to 28. And the Parish was able to purchase a 3700 bell from St. Mary's Catholic Church in Winchester. The new Parish Church was dedicated in September, 1981. In 1990 four clocks were installed in the bell tower.

The church is on the Southern end of the Arlington Center Historic District.

== Gallery ==
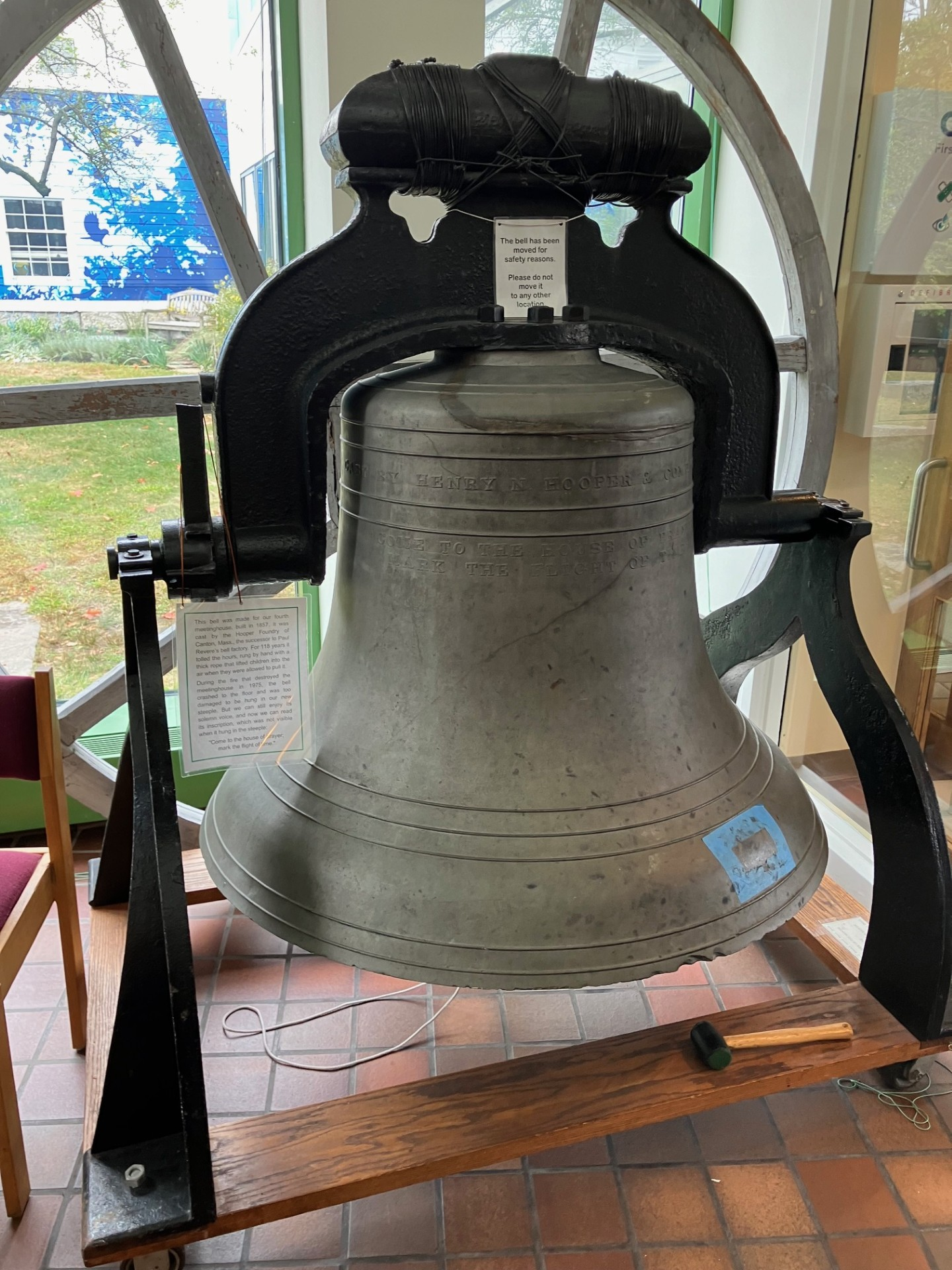
Bell recovered from the ashes after the 1975 fire that destroyed the fourth church structure.

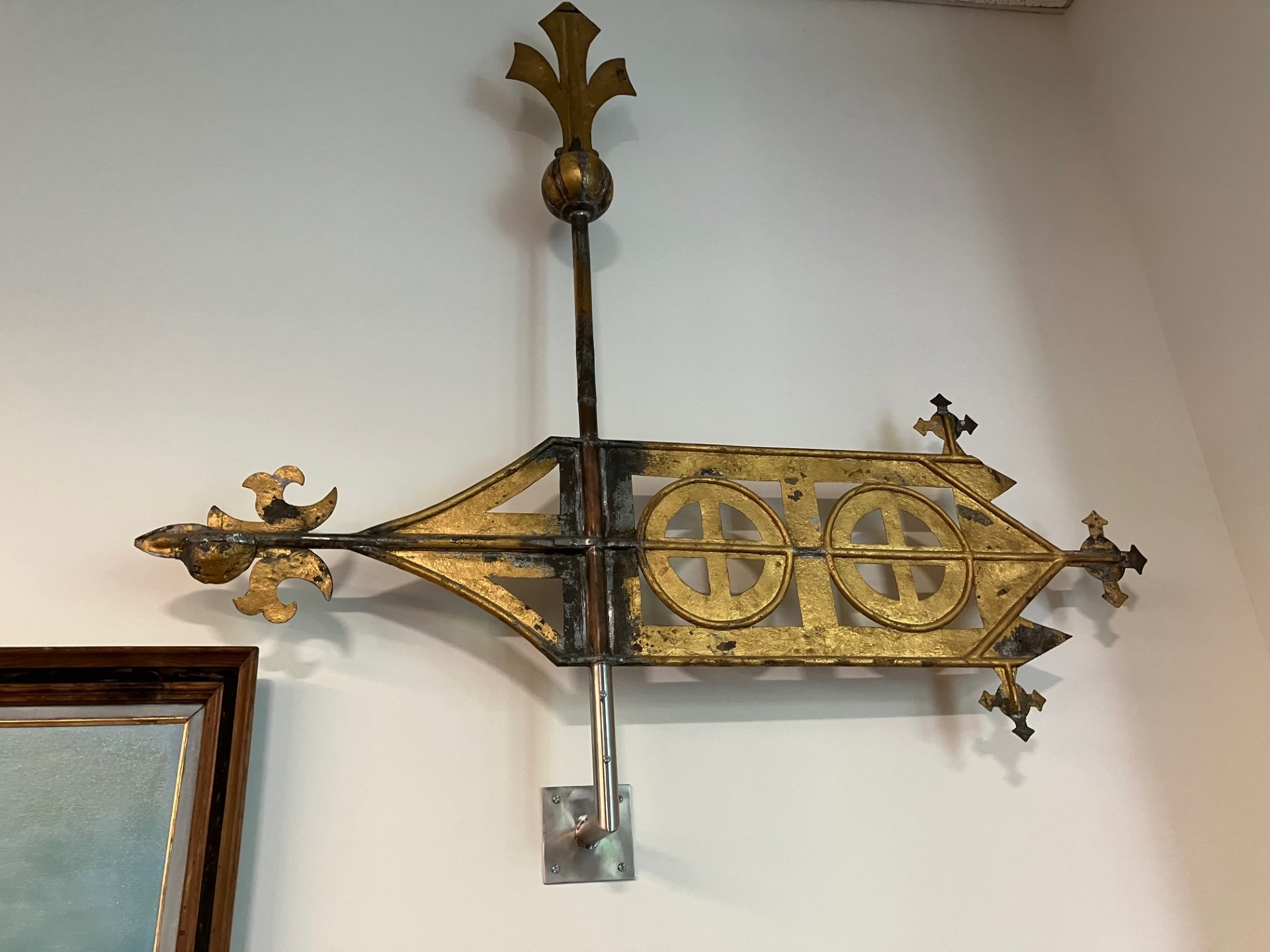
Weathervane recovered from the ashes of the 1975 fire

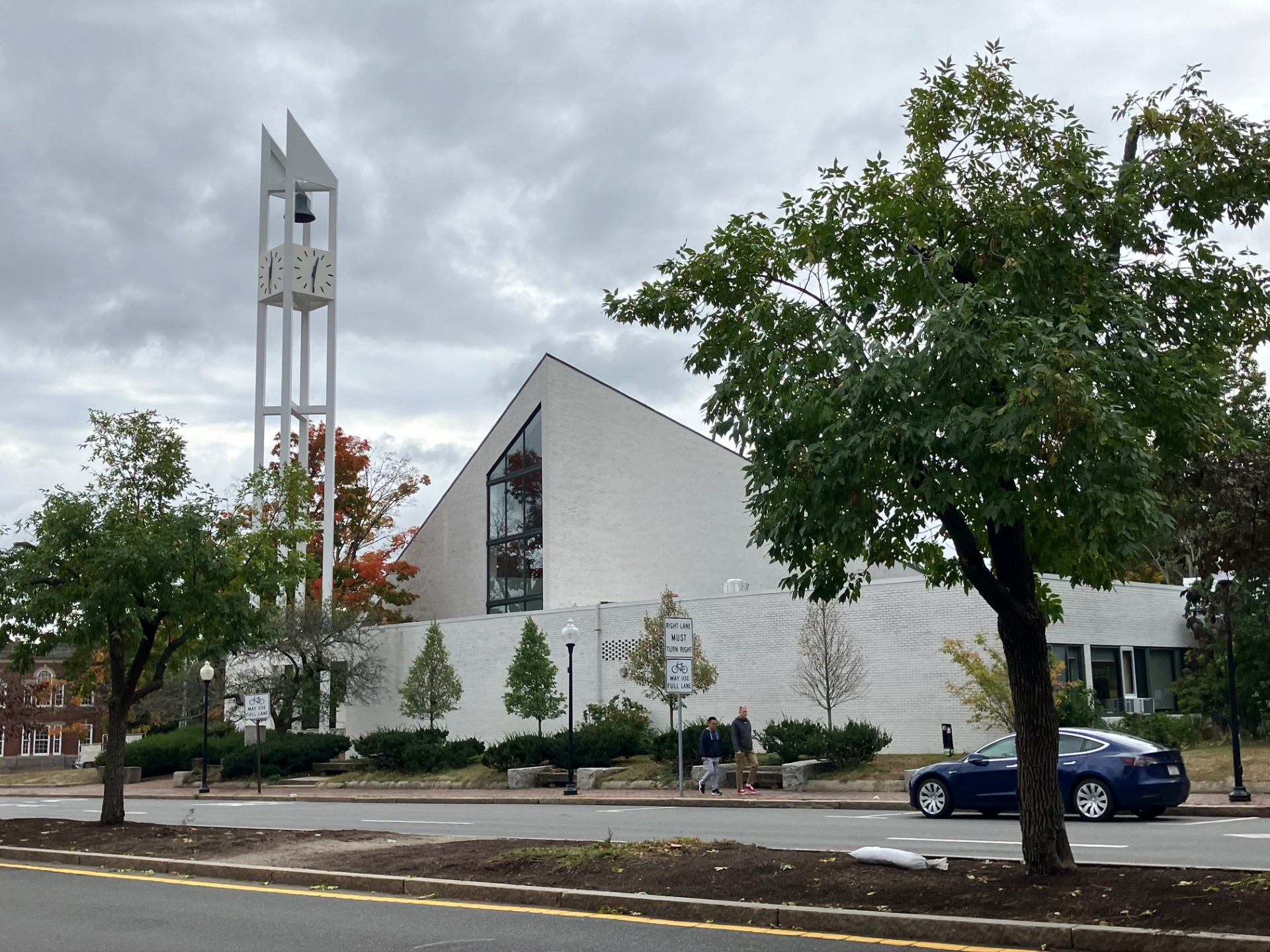
First Parish Church Arlington, Mass Exterior view showing main church and bell tower with clock

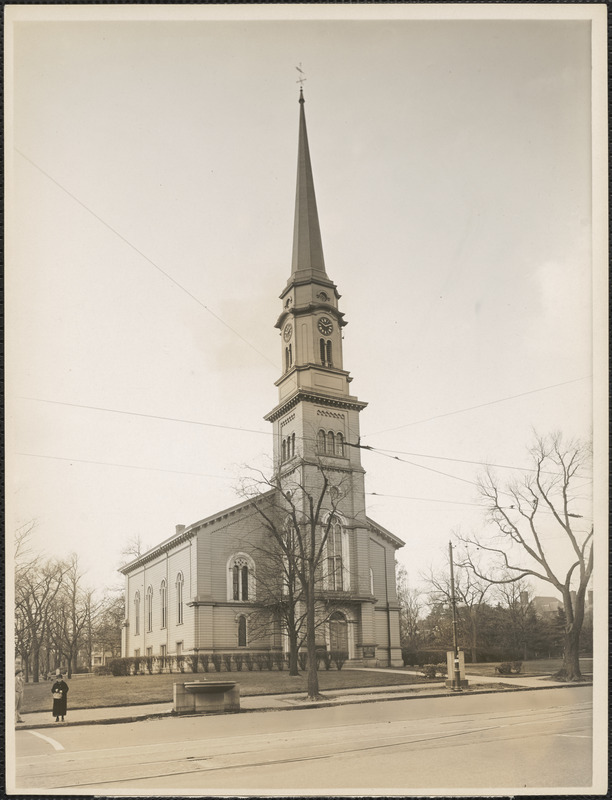
Fourth edifice to serve as the First Parish Church

== See also ==
- First Parish Website
- First Parish Church Parsonage
