= Robbins Memorial Flagstaff =

Coordinates: 42.416068°N 71.156733°W

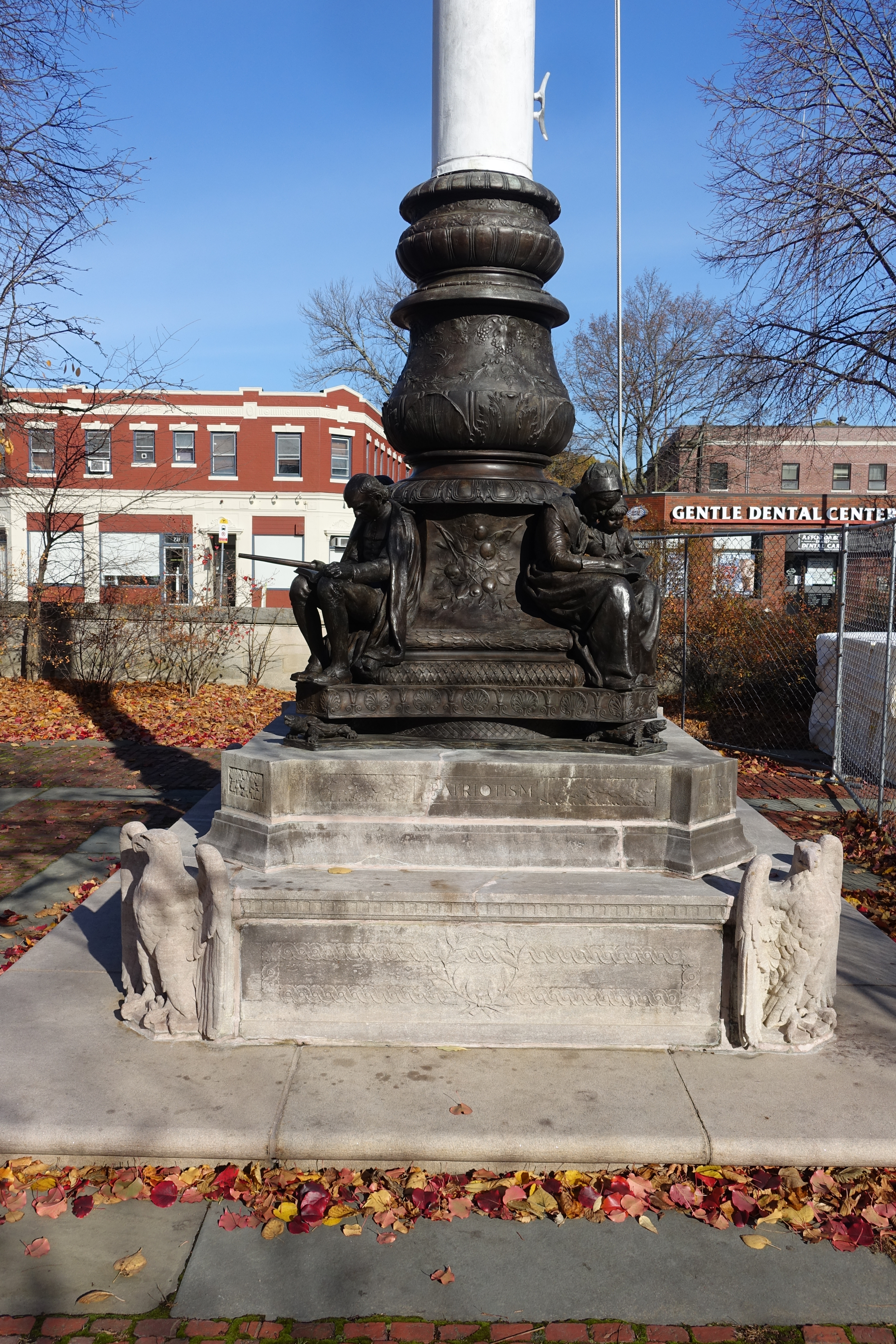
- Artist: Cyrus E. Dallin
- Year: 1913
- Completion date: 19
- Medium: Bronze
- Subject: Includes several sculptural figures including The Minuteman of 1776, a gentleman reading, Squaw Sachem, an Indigenous American woman and a woman teaching a child to read
- Dimensions: (5 ft in)
- Location: Arlington, Massachusetts, U.S.
- Owner: Town of Arlington, Massachusetts

The Robbins Memorial Flagstaff (1913) is a structure supporting and topping a flagpole in Arlington, Massachusetts created by Cyrus Dallin. The supporting sculpture includes a variety of sculptural elements including bronze figures, stone eagles, and snapping turtles with a finial representing American Agriculture. The sculpture resides to the west of Town Hall at 730 Massachusetts Avenue.

The sculpture was commissioned by architect Richard Clipston Sturgis who prepared the site plan for the library/town hall area and designed the adjacent Town Hall. Cyrus Dallin created the sculpture with input by Sturgis. The eagles on the base were executed by the prominent stone carver, John Evans of Boston. On June 25, 1913, this sculpture and the nearby Menotomy Hunter were dedicated and Dallin's speech included a passionate plea for renaming the town of Arlington as Menotomy after the historic significance of its largely vanished inhabitants.

The four figures around the base include a colonial woman teaching a child to read, an Indigenous American woman with a papoose on her back, the Minuteman of 1776, and a man reading a bible. At the time of its creation it was described as "Perhaps as great a test of a sculptor's powers as anything that could be conceived."

The sculpture can be found about 300 yards west of the Cyrus Dallin Art Museum.

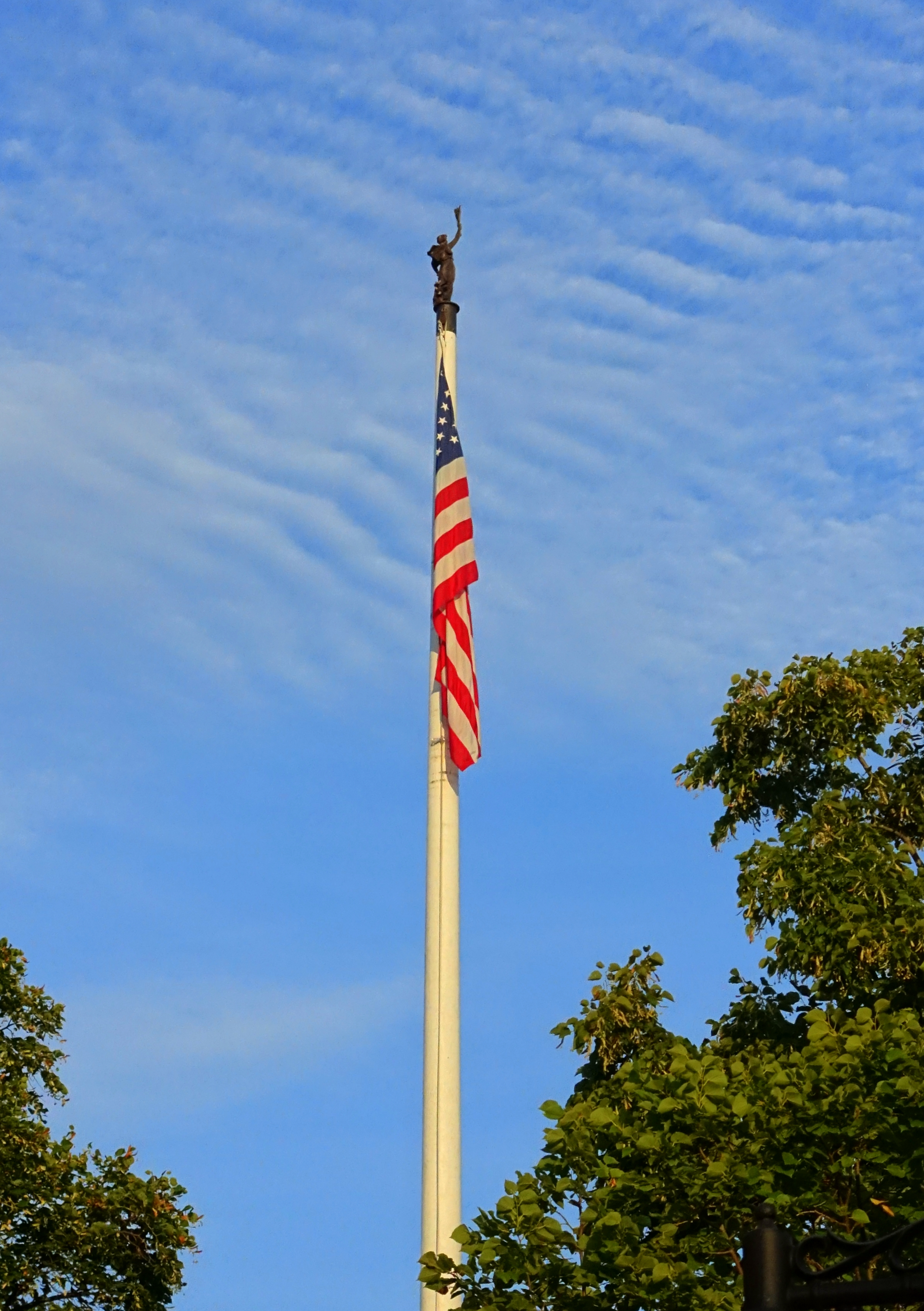
American Agriculture Figure Original can be seen close up in the nearby Cyrus Dallin Art Museum

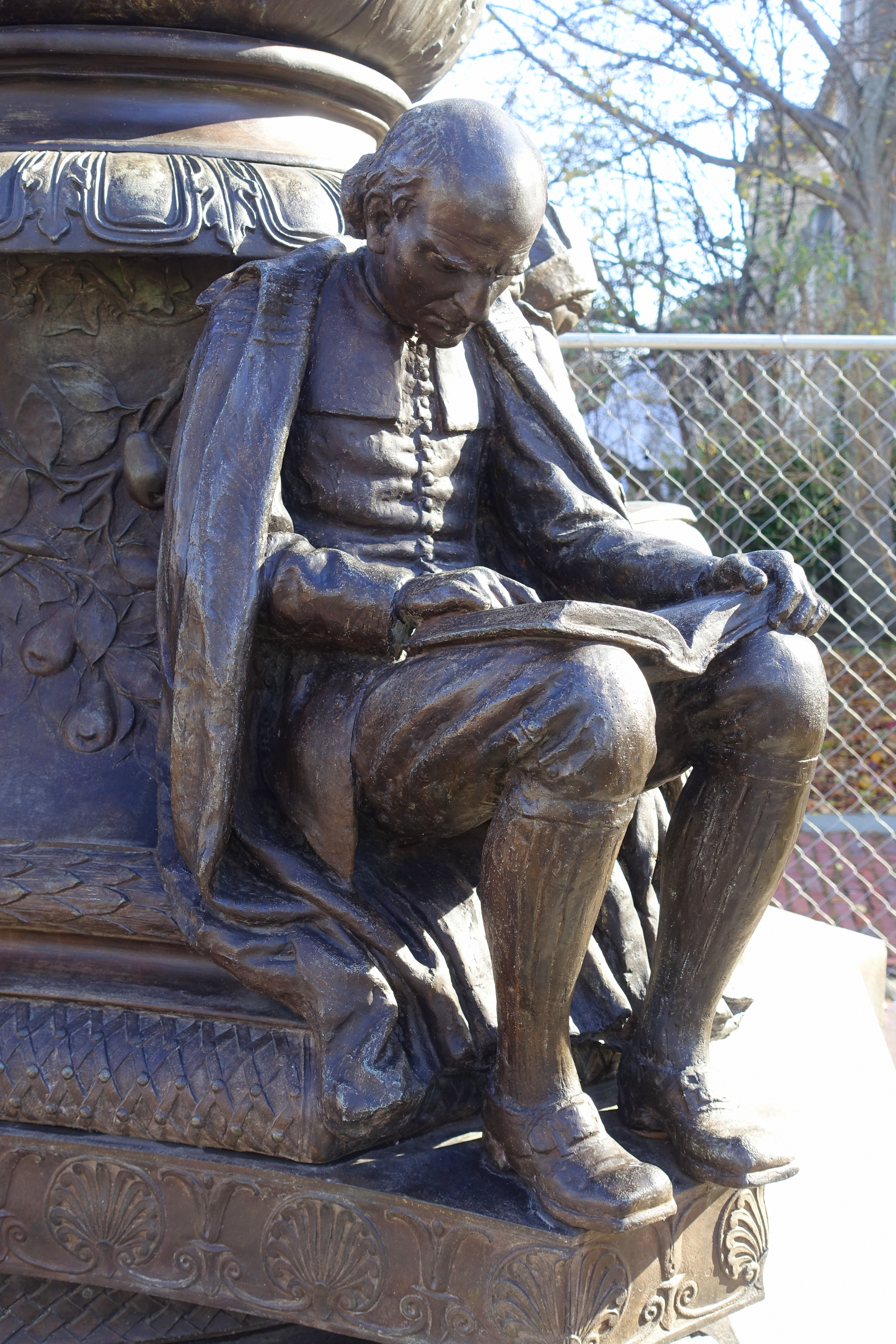
Pilgrim Divine

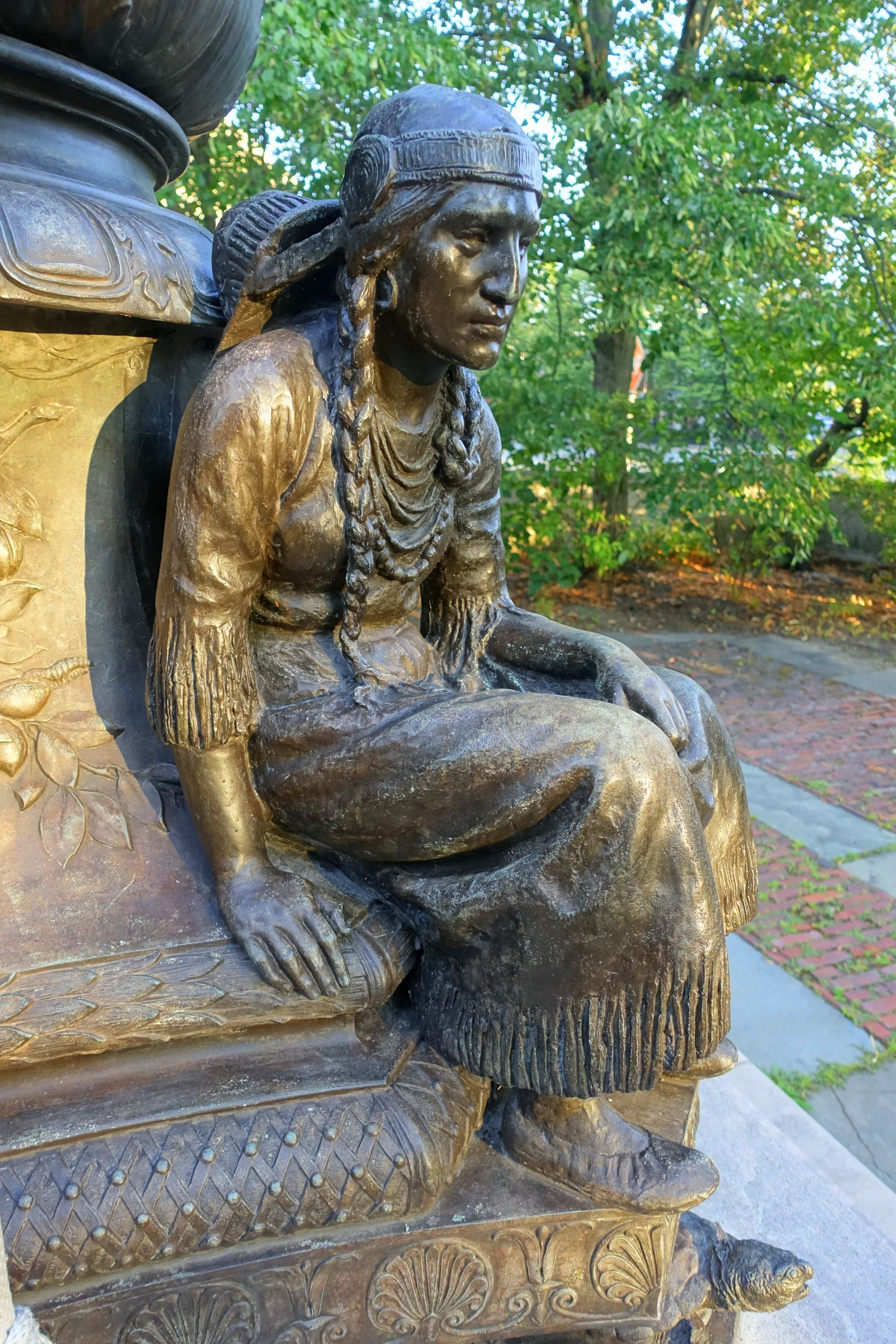
Squaw Sachem

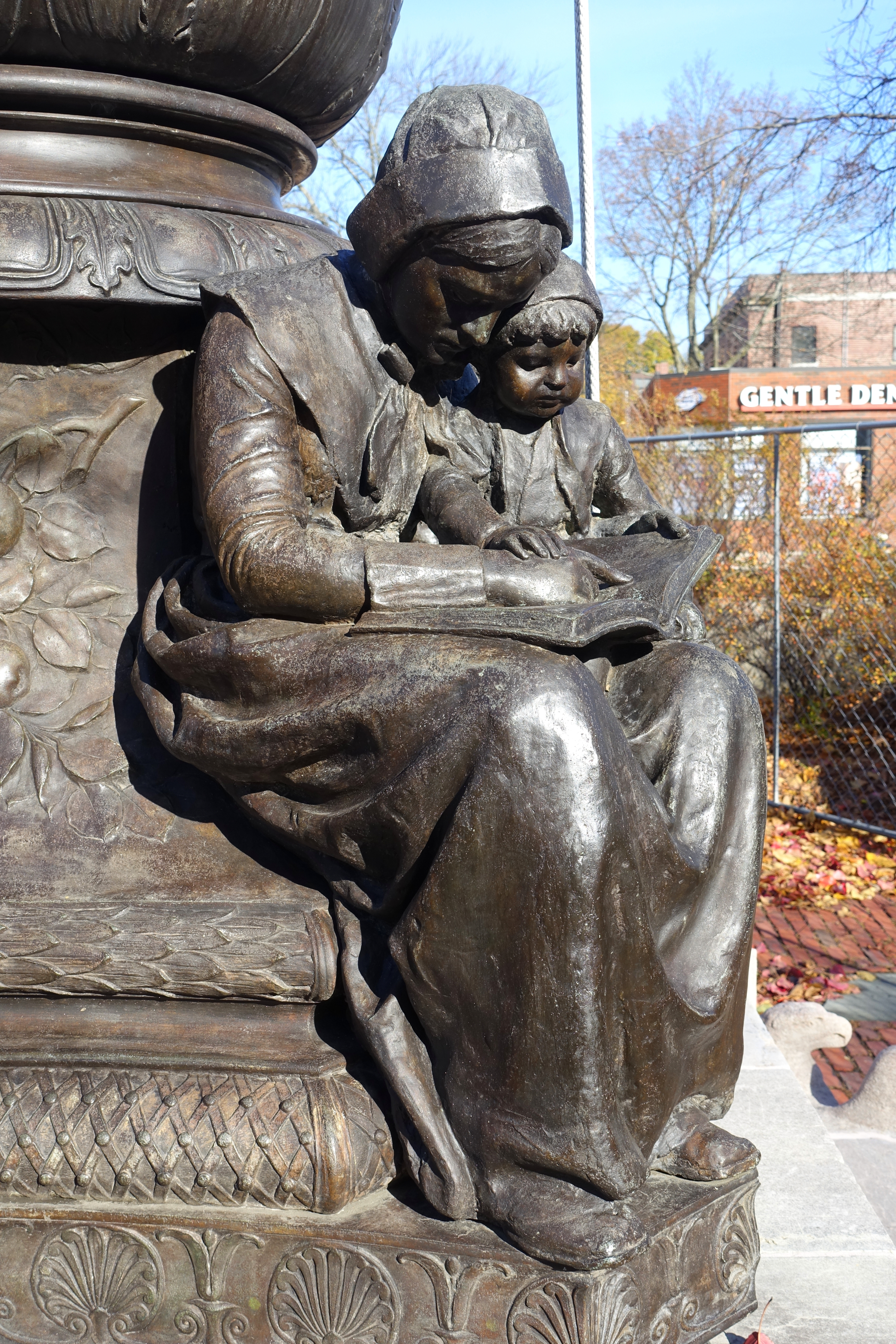
Pilgrim Mother and Child

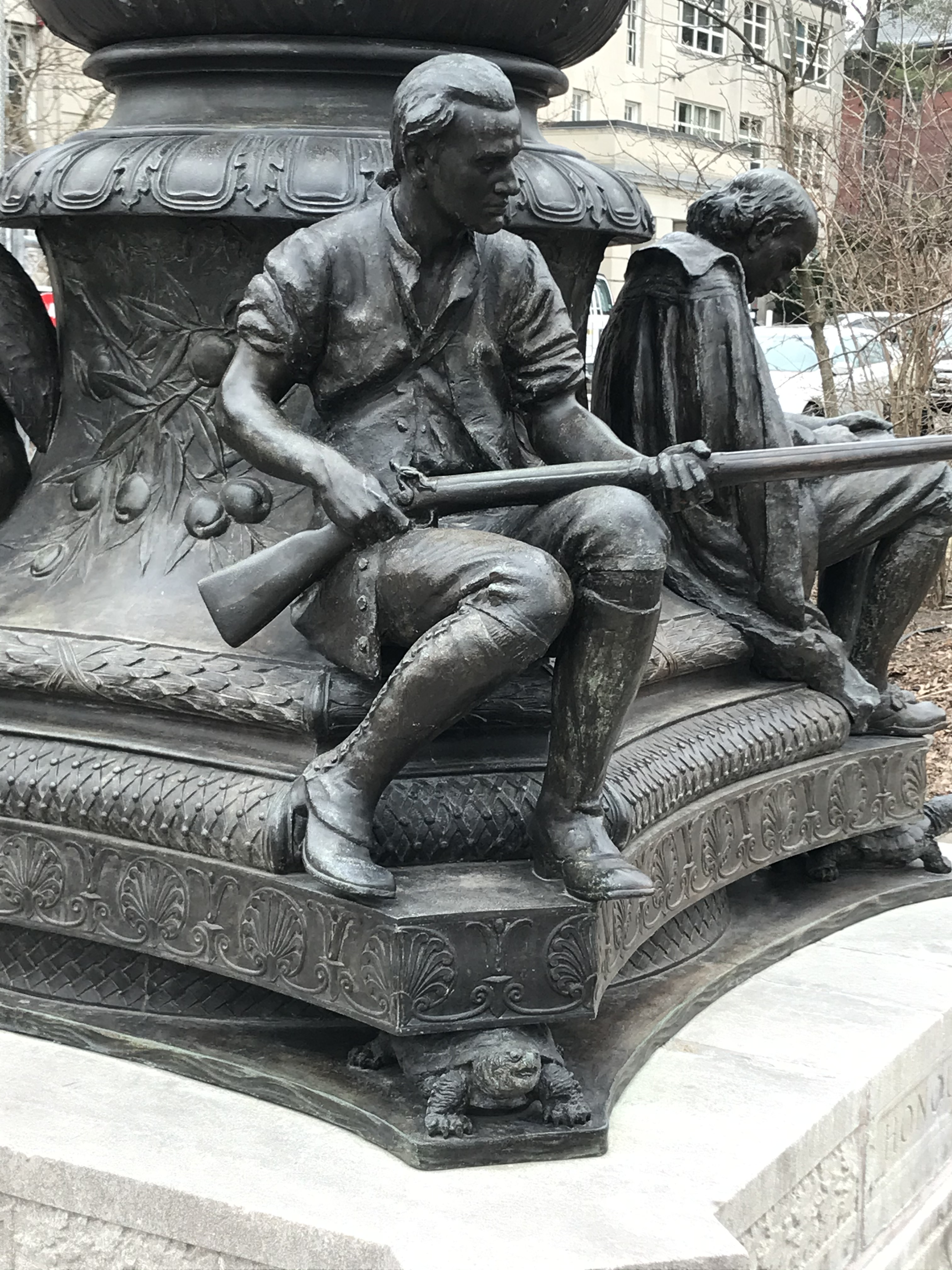
Patriot

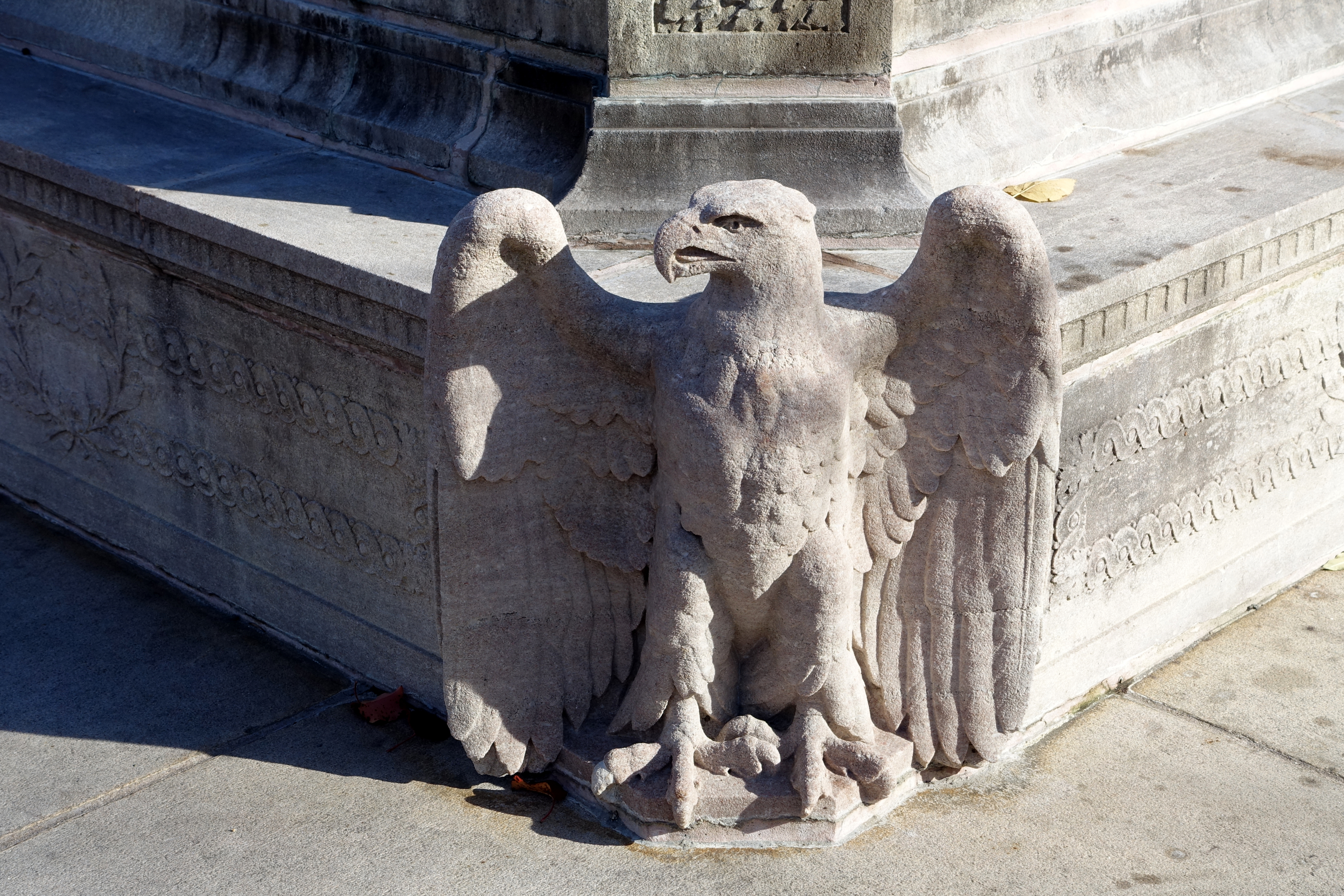
Eagle

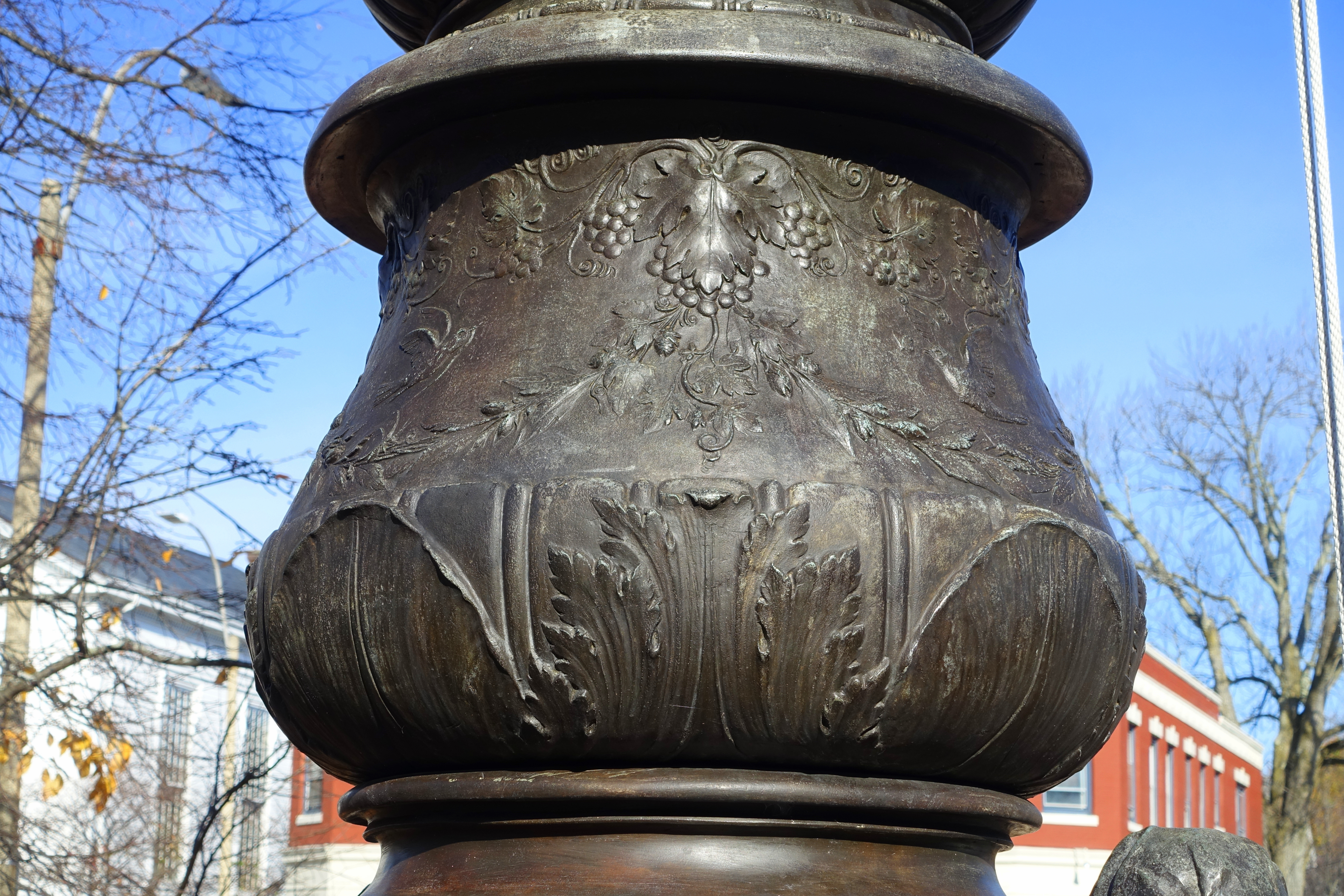
Ornament
