= Appeal to the Great Spirit =

Equestrian statue by Cyrus Dallin in Boston, MA

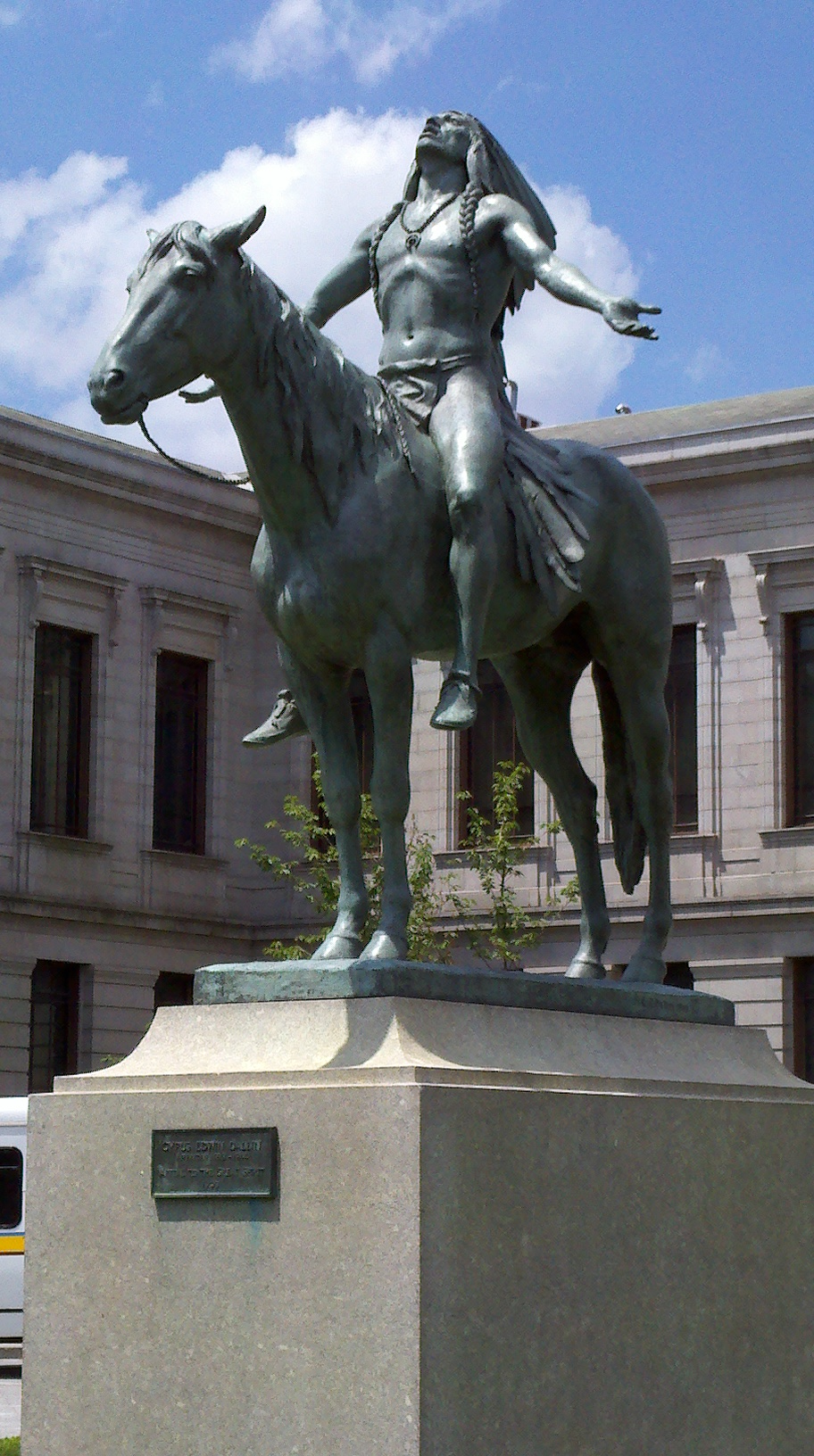
- Artist: Cyrus Edwin Dallin
- Year: 1908
- Type: Bronze
- Dimensions: 290 cm × 250 cm × 300 cm (114 in × 100 in × 120 in)
- Location: Boston, Massachusetts, U.S.; 42.33873°N 71.09367°W
- Owner: Boston Museum of Fine Arts

Appeal to the Great Spirit is a 1908 equestrian statue by Cyrus Dallin, installed in 1912 on the front lawn of the Museum of Fine Arts, Boston, where it has remained since. It portrays an anonymous Native American figure in a mix of Diné- Lakota-style regalia on horseback facing skyward. Dallin portrays the figure with his arms outstretched, as if in a spiritual request to the Great Spirit. It is the final of the four sculptures created within the series, The Epic of the Indian, which also includes A Signal of Peace (1890), The Medicine Man (1899), and Protest of the Sioux (1904).

A statuette of Appeal to the Great Spirit is in the permanent collection of the White House and was exhibited in President Bill Clinton's Oval Office. British Prime Minister Rt. Hon. David Lloyd George also had a statuette, which he received in association with a meeting with Sioux Chief Two Eagle during an October 1923 tour of the US and Canada

== History ==
Having grown up in Utah, the young Dallin frequently interacted with Native American children, who gave him insights that he called upon while creating this and other works. For Appeal to the Great Spirit , the model was Antonio Corsi, who posed for several great painters and sculptors of the era.

Appeal to the Great Spirit was cast in Paris, and won a gold medal for its exhibition in the Paris Salon. On January 23, 1912, it was installed outside the main entrance to the Boston Museum of Fine Arts (MFA). The installation was originally intended to be temporary, but the statue was never removed, and eventually came to be considered as an iconic symbol of the MFA.

A restoration of the original Boston version was reversed at Dallin's request, because he preferred the light green tones that had developed on the equestrian sculpture over time rather than the typical "statuary brown" patina the conservator applied without consulting him.

Prominent Equestrian Statues of Indigenous People, by Cyrus Edwin Dallin

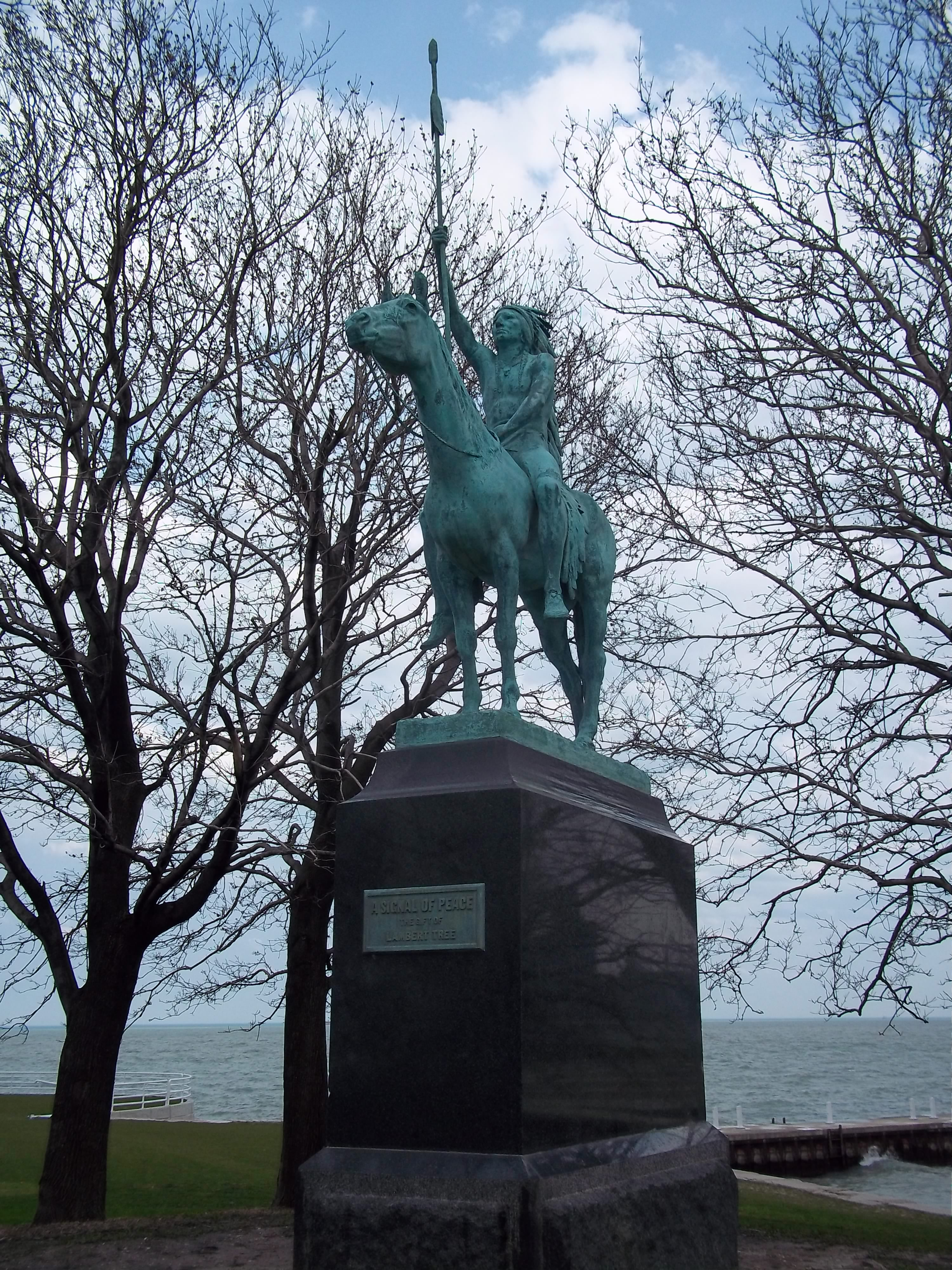
A Signal of Peace (1890)

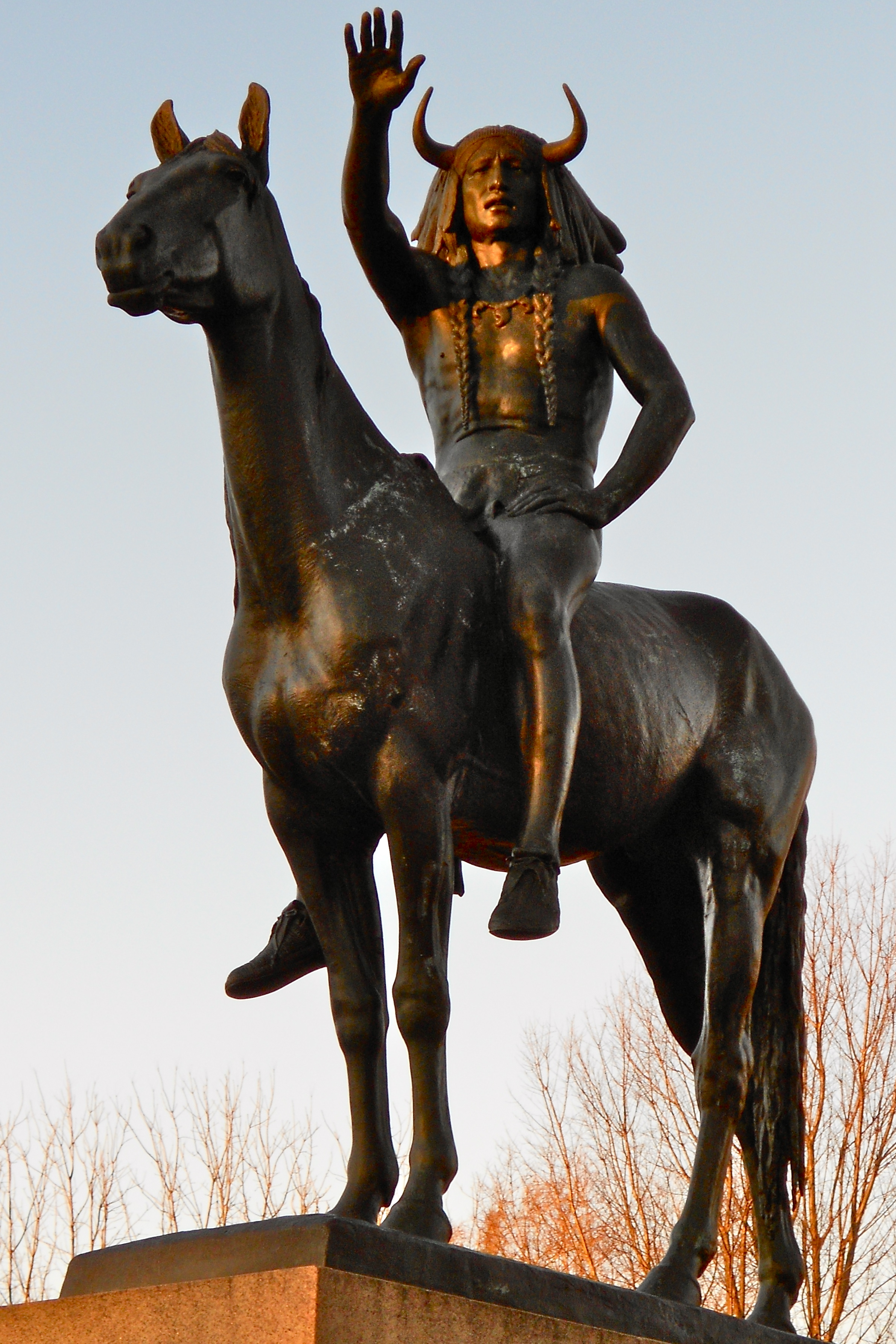
The Medicine Man (1899)

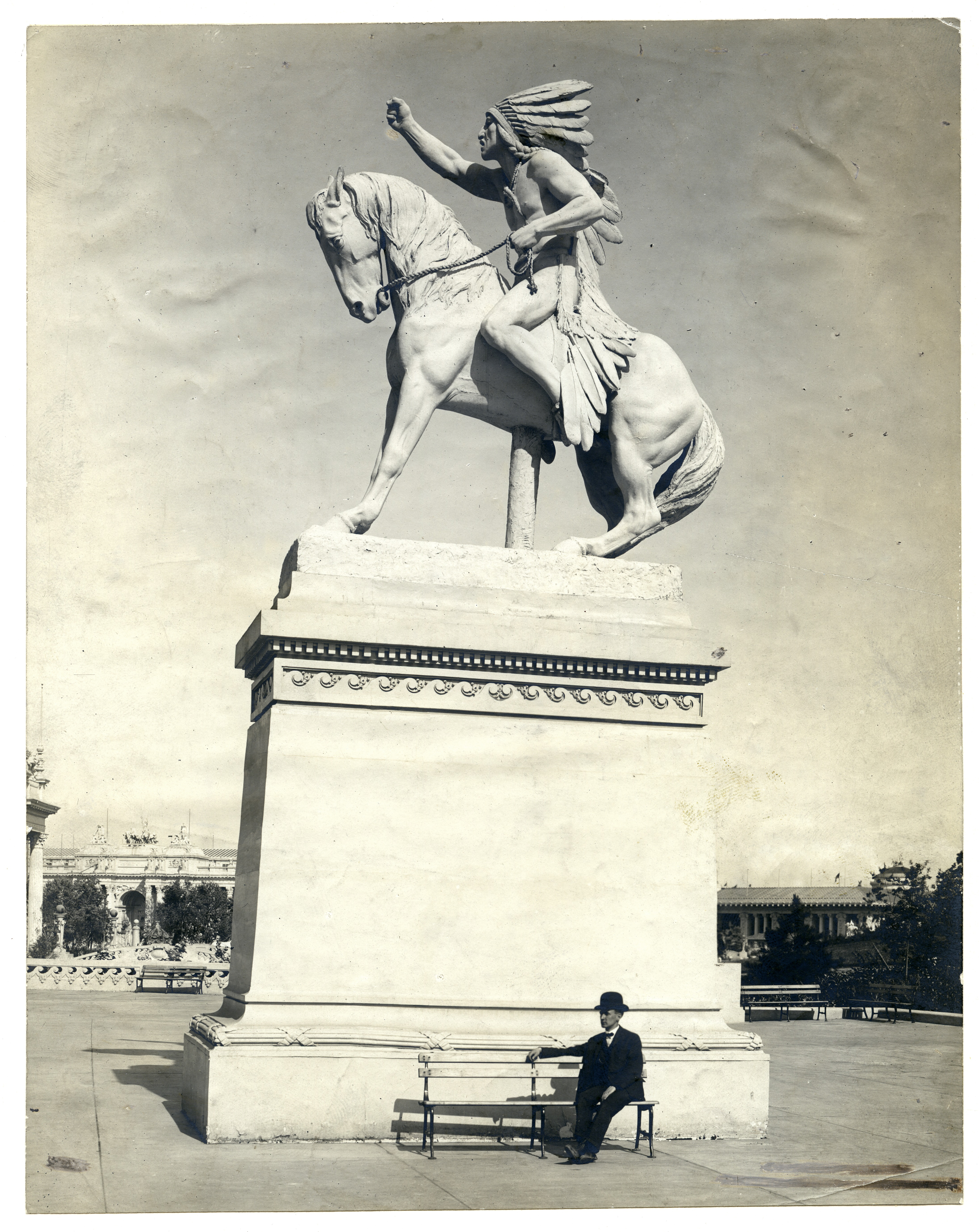
Protest of the Sioux (1904)

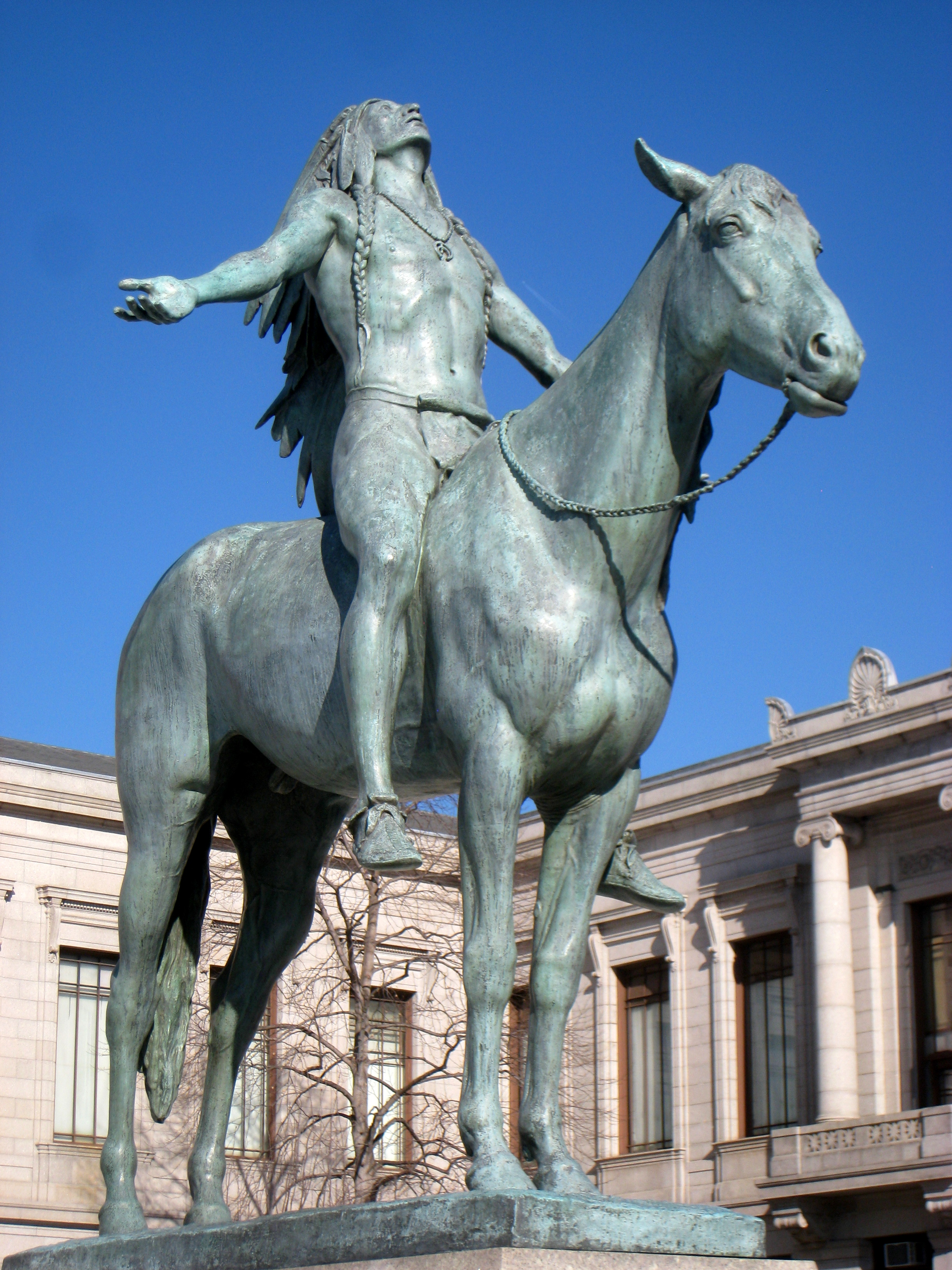
Appeal to the Great Spirit (1908)

On March 3, 2019, the MFA convened a public discussion of the artwork among five art historians and museum curators; two of the panelists were also members of Native American tribes. In October 2019, as part of its first community celebration of Indigenous Peoples' Day, the MFA surrounded its iconic statue with placards displaying questions and comments submitted by the community, including Native Americans. In 2020, the MFA website posted two brief essays written by Native Americans commenting on the sculpture and its cultural meanings.

== Other versions ==
In 1929 a full-sized bronze copy, personally overseen and approved by Dallin was installed in Muncie, Indiana, at the intersection of Walnut Street and Granville Avenue in the Wysor Heights Historic District. Many residents consider it a symbol of the city. The statue was erected "In Loving Memory of Edmund Burke Ball" by "His Wife and Children".

Nine editions of a 40-inch (1,000 mm) bronze statuette of Appeal to the Great Spirit were produced around 1922. One was the centerpiece of the Tower Room of Dartmouth College's Baker Tower, the college's main library and most iconic building, but has since been removed.

Plaster versions in one-third scale are located at the Cyrus Dallin Museum in Arlington, Massachusetts and the Rockwell Museum in Corning, New York. Central High School in Tulsa, Oklahoma, possessed another plaster model used in 1985 for a bronze statuette cast by American Artbronze Fine Arts Foundry under the direction of Howard R. Kirsch. This version is now installed in Woodward Park in Tulsa, Oklahoma at the intersection of 21st Street and Peoria.

Editions of the 21-inch (530 mm) bronze statuette are located at the White House, the US Department of State, and other American museums.

An 8 1/2-inch (220 mm) miniature edition was produced by the Gorham Manufacturing Company in 1913; in 2009, No. 263 sold for $9,375.

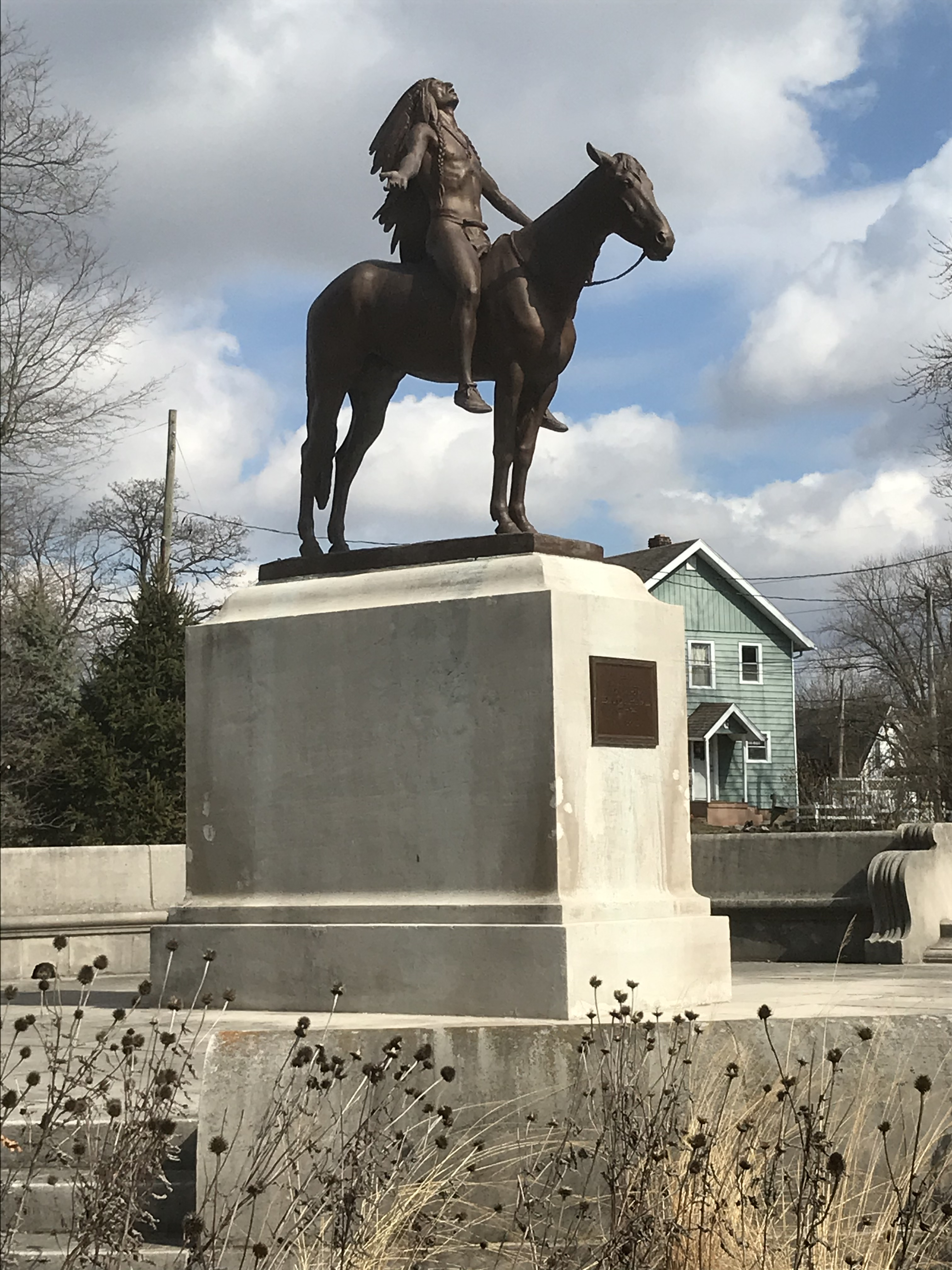
Muncie, Indiana

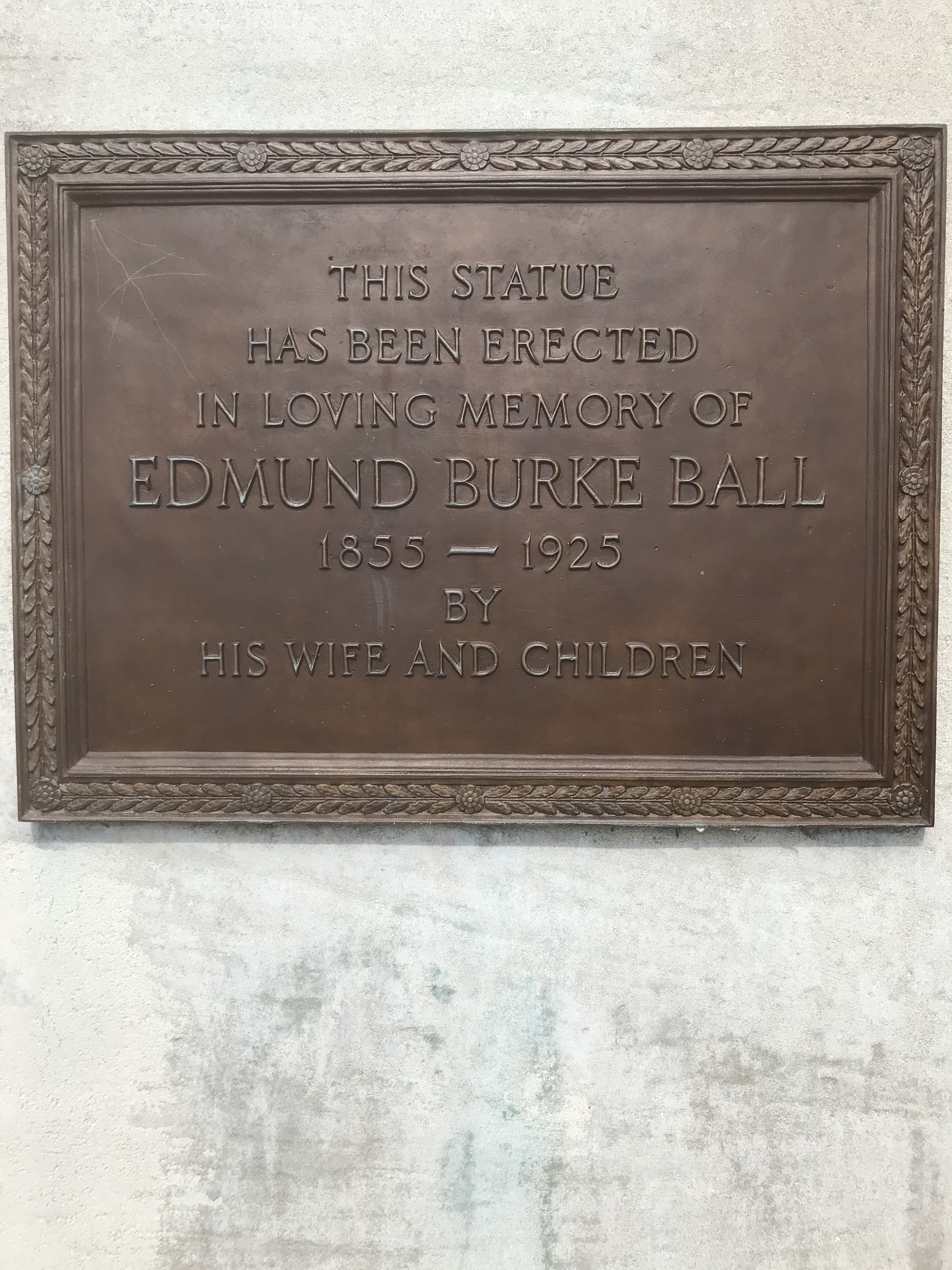
Plaque at Muncie

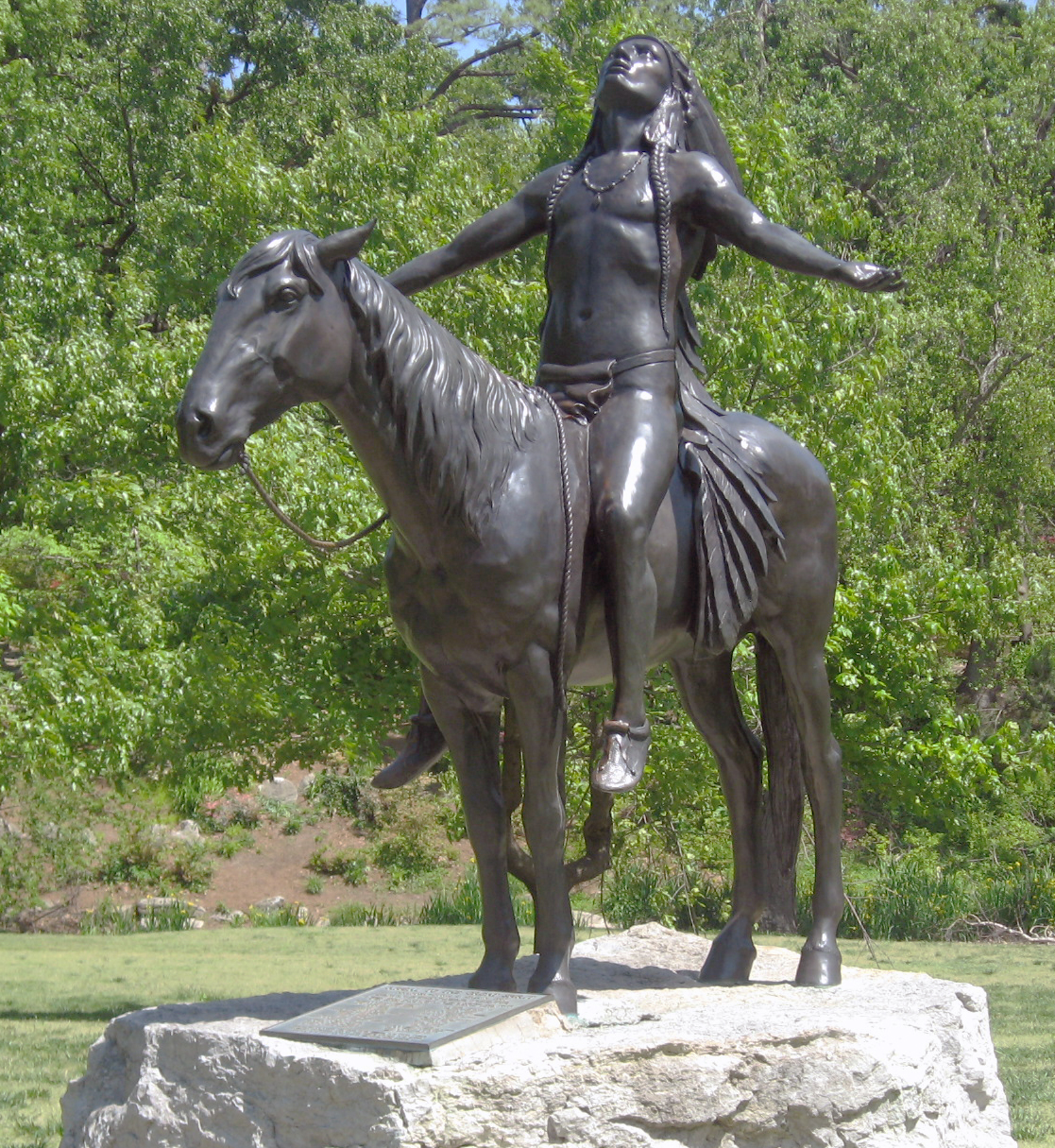
Woodward Park, Tulsa, Oklahoma

== In literature and the arts ==
Brother Records logo

- An early instance of the sculpture's place in American culture is its appearance (as photographed by Baldwin Coolidge) on the cover of "A-M-E-R-I-C-A" (1917), a World War I song by May Greene and Billy Lang and published by D. W. Cooper.
- The sculpture is used as the logo for the Beach Boys' vanity record label Brother Records. It was first seen in the lower-left corner on the band's 1967 album Smiley Smile and its attending single "Heroes and Villains", and was used more prominently on the cover of their 1973 album The Beach Boys in Concert. When Beach Boy Carl Wilson was asked in 1975 why the group used this as their logo, he said the Indian was chosen because Brian, Dennis, and Carl's grandfather believed that there was a spiritual Indian "guide" who watched over them from the "other side". The choice of the logo was Brian's. Carl called the logo "The Last Horizon".
- A painting of the sculpture appears on the cover of the album The Time Is Near (1970) by the rock group Keef Hartley Band.
- A painting of the sculpture appears on the cover of the album Spirit of God (1984) by the Native American Gospel recording artist Johnny P. Curtis.
- A painting of the sculpture appears on the cover of the album Lysol (1992) by rock group The Melvins.
- In the vinyl release of Directions to See a Ghost (2008) by the American rock band The Black Angels, the poster inside features a skeleton form of this sculpture with a psychedelic background.
- In 2020, Dartmouth College's Hood Museum of Art commissioned Cree artist Kent Monkman to paint The Great Mystery, which reinterprets the Appeal to the Great Spirit sculpture incorporating a Mark Rothko painting in the background. The work is displayed near a mid-sized version of Dallin's sculpture.
- In 2021, two temporary art installations were placed around and near to the sculpture. Raven Reshapes Boston: A Native Corn Garden at the MFA, by Elizabeth James-Perry, (Aquinnah Wampanoag, b. 1973), consists of corn, beans, and sedges planted in a small garden completely surrounding the statue. Ekua Holmes (African American, b. 1955), planted a large patch of sunflowers close by, called Radiant Community, as part of her ongoing Roxbury Sunflower Project.

== See also ==
- Art in the White House
- List of sculptures by Cyrus Dallin in Massachusetts
