= A Signal of Peace =

Equestrian statue in Chicago

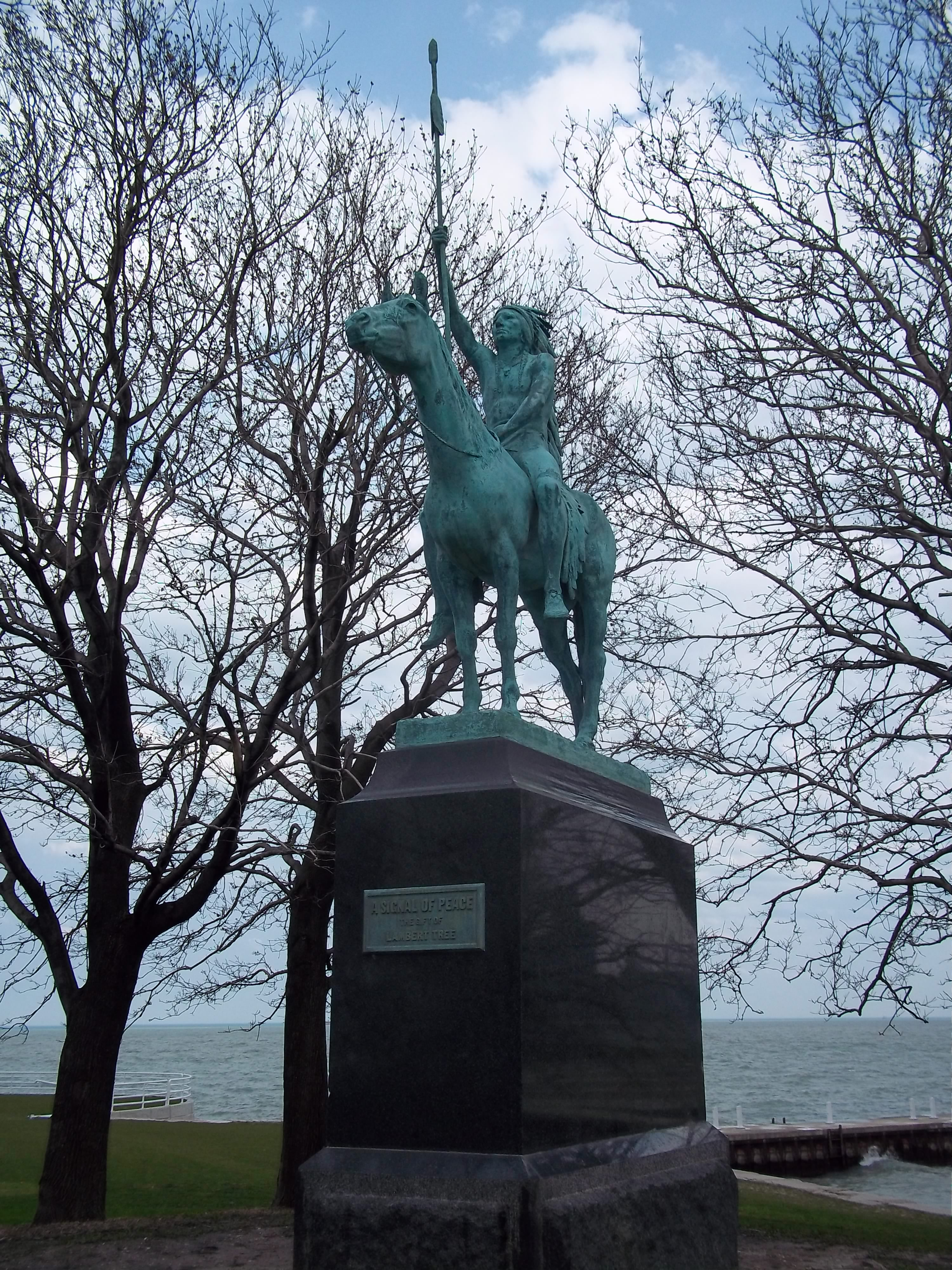
- Artist: Cyrus Edwin Dallin
- Year: 1890
- Type: Bronze
- Dimensions: 150 cm × 76 cm × 150 cm (5 ft × 2.5 ft × 5 ft)
- Location: Chicago, Illinois, United States; 41.9332°N 87.6315°W

A Signal of Peace is an 1890 bronze equestrian sculpture by Cyrus Edwin Dallin located in Lincoln Park, Chicago. Dallin created the work while studying in Paris and based the figure on a member of Buffalo Bill's Wild West Show, which he attended often. He exhibited the original plaster version of the sculpture at the Paris Salon of 1890, where it won honorable mention.

In 1893, Lambert Tree bought the bronze version of the statue at the World's Columbian Exposition for $10,000, and donated it to Lincoln Park in Chicago, where it has stood since the summer of 1894.

Despite Dallin's admiration for Indigenous people and his objection to their mistreatment by white settlers, the monument has sometimes been criticized as reinforcing stereotypes about Native Americans as "savages" and a "dying race."

== Background ==
Dallin grew up in Springville, Utah, where he lived in a settlement near the Paiute and Ute tribes. His English father, Thomas Dallin, encouraged Cyrus and his siblings to play with children from the tribes in the area. From these experiences, Dallin learned how to use a bow and arrow, ride a horse, and play Paiute and Ute games. Dallin cited this upbringing as the source of his interest in Indigenous people and culture.

=== The Epic of the Indian ===
A Signal of Peace is one of Dallin's four most prominent sculptures of Indigenous people, alongside The Medicine Man (1899), Protest of the Sioux (1904), and Appeal to the Great Spirit (1908). The four works are sometimes described as a series known as The Epic of the Indian.

Dallin himself did not refer to the four sculptures as a series, but critics have often interpreted the works as a narrative about the fate of Native Americans. According to this reading, the series begins with A Signal of Peace depicting the "naive" welcome of Europeans by the Indian chief. This moment is followed by hesitancy and the realization that white settlers may cause harm in The Medicine Man. With The Protest of the Sioux, the American Indian is seen as fighting back against mistreatment from settlers. Appeal to the Great Spirit is then interpreted to represent the defeat of Indigenous people, as the Native American adopts a pose of surrender.

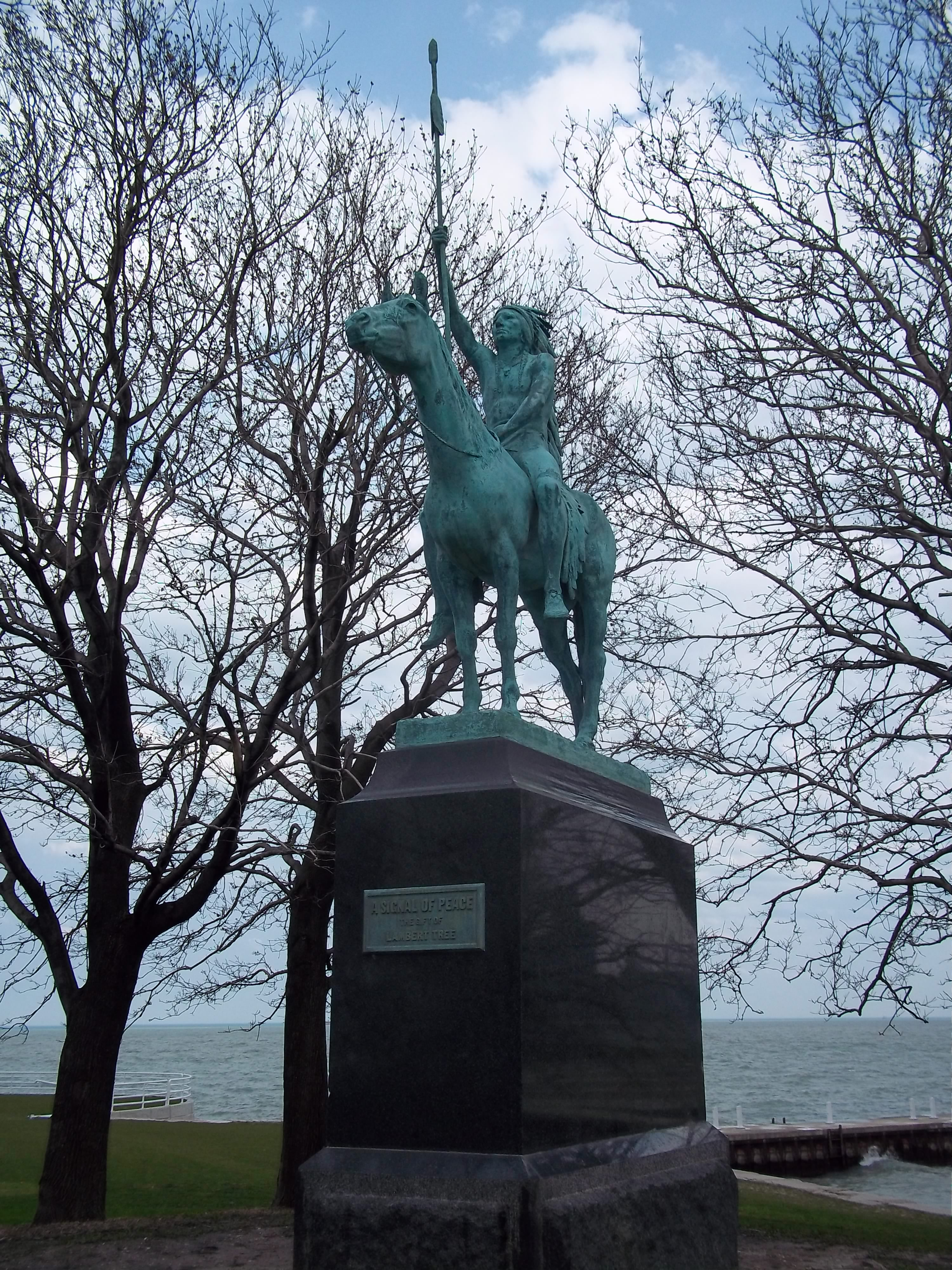
A Signal of Peace (1890)

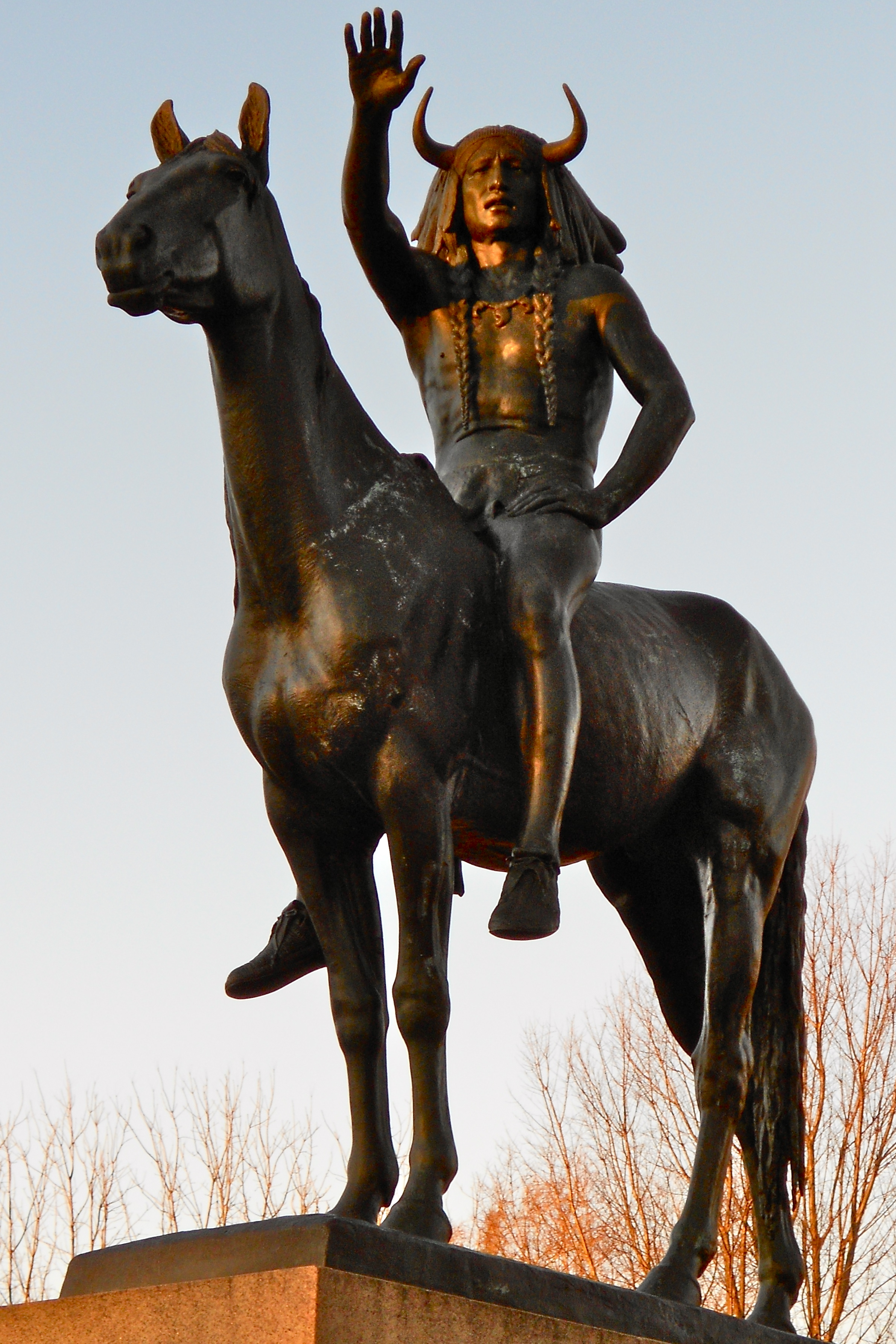
The Medicine Man (1899)

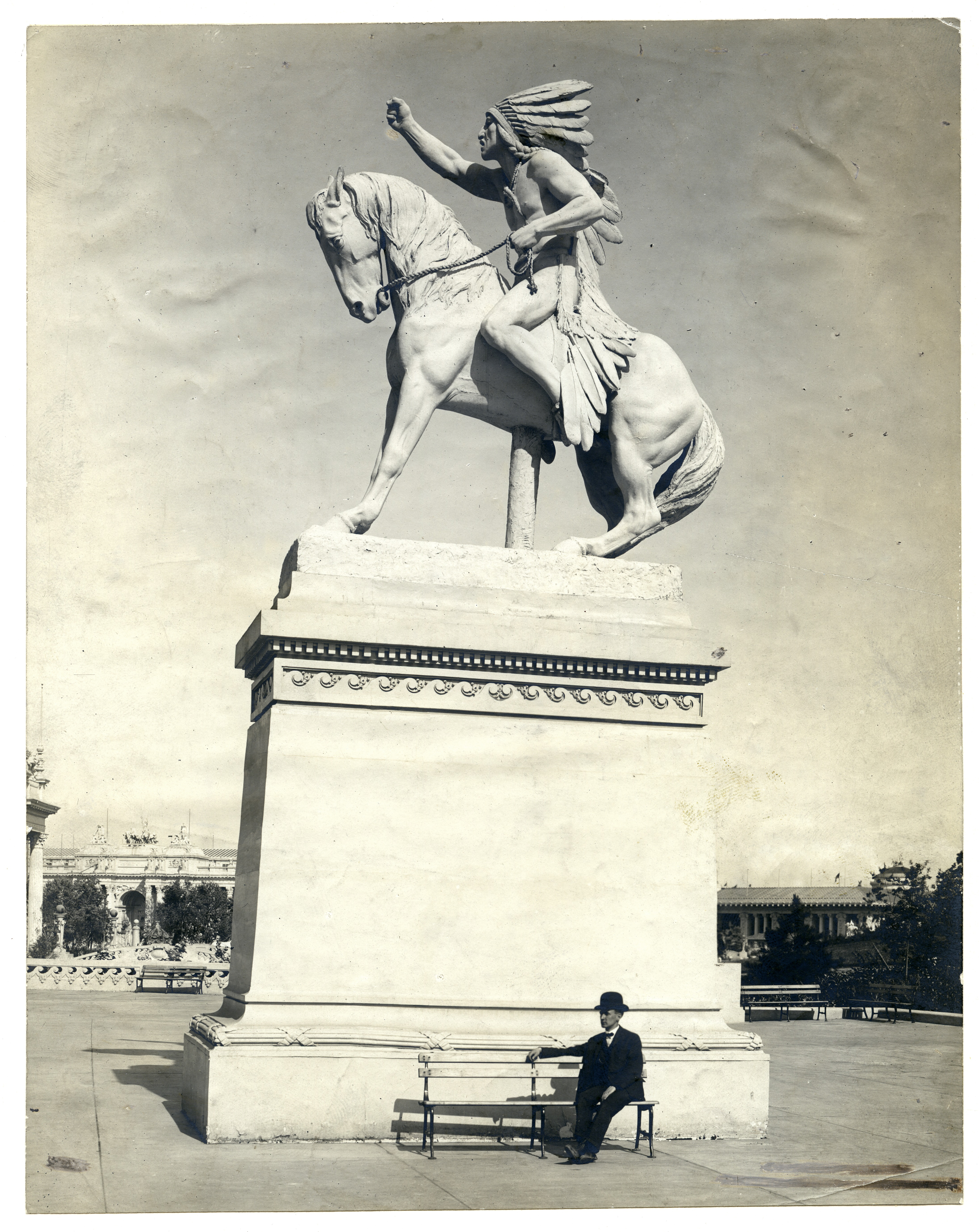
Protest of the Sioux (1904)

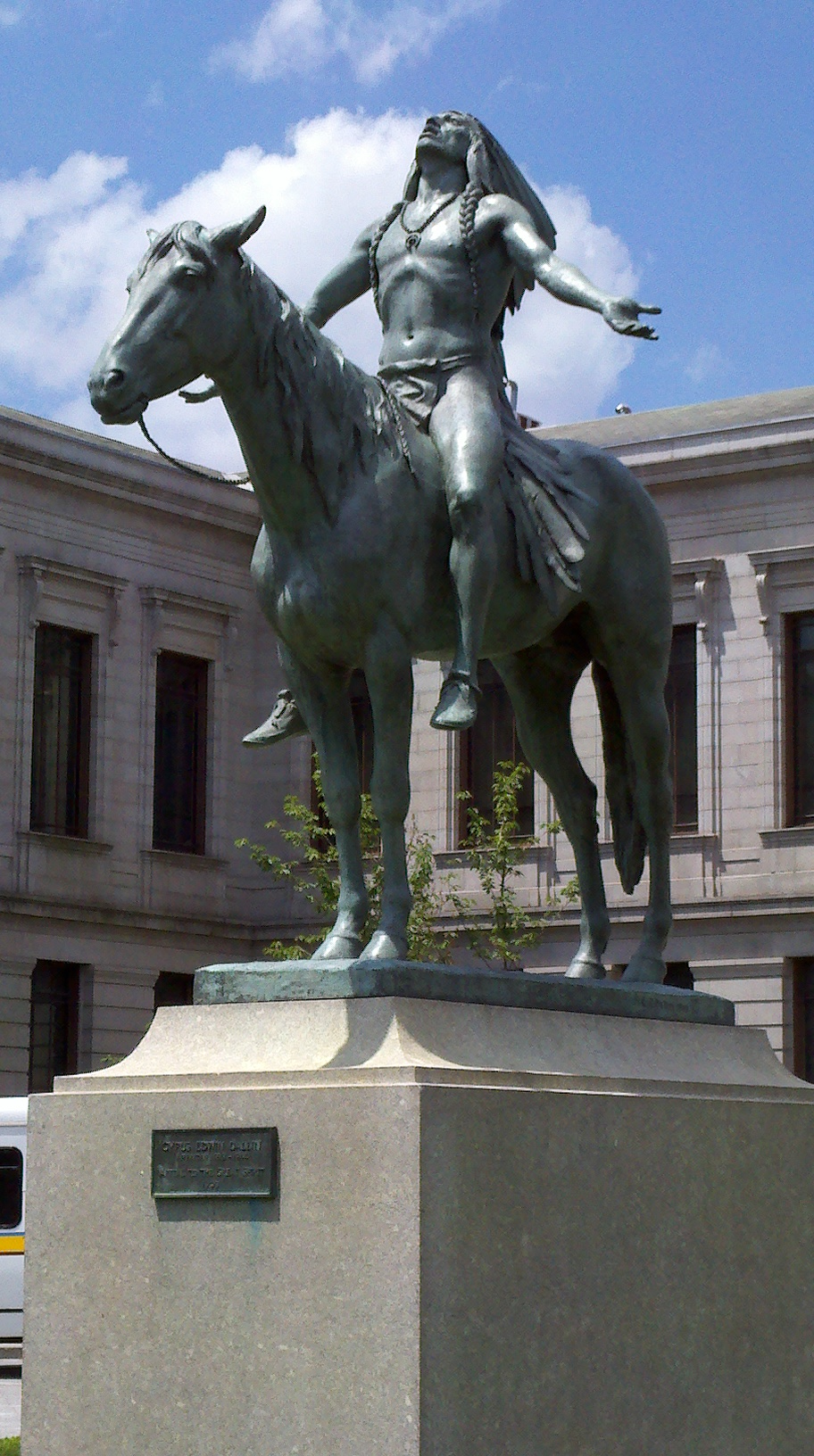
Appeal to the Great Spirit (1908)

== Design process and funding ==
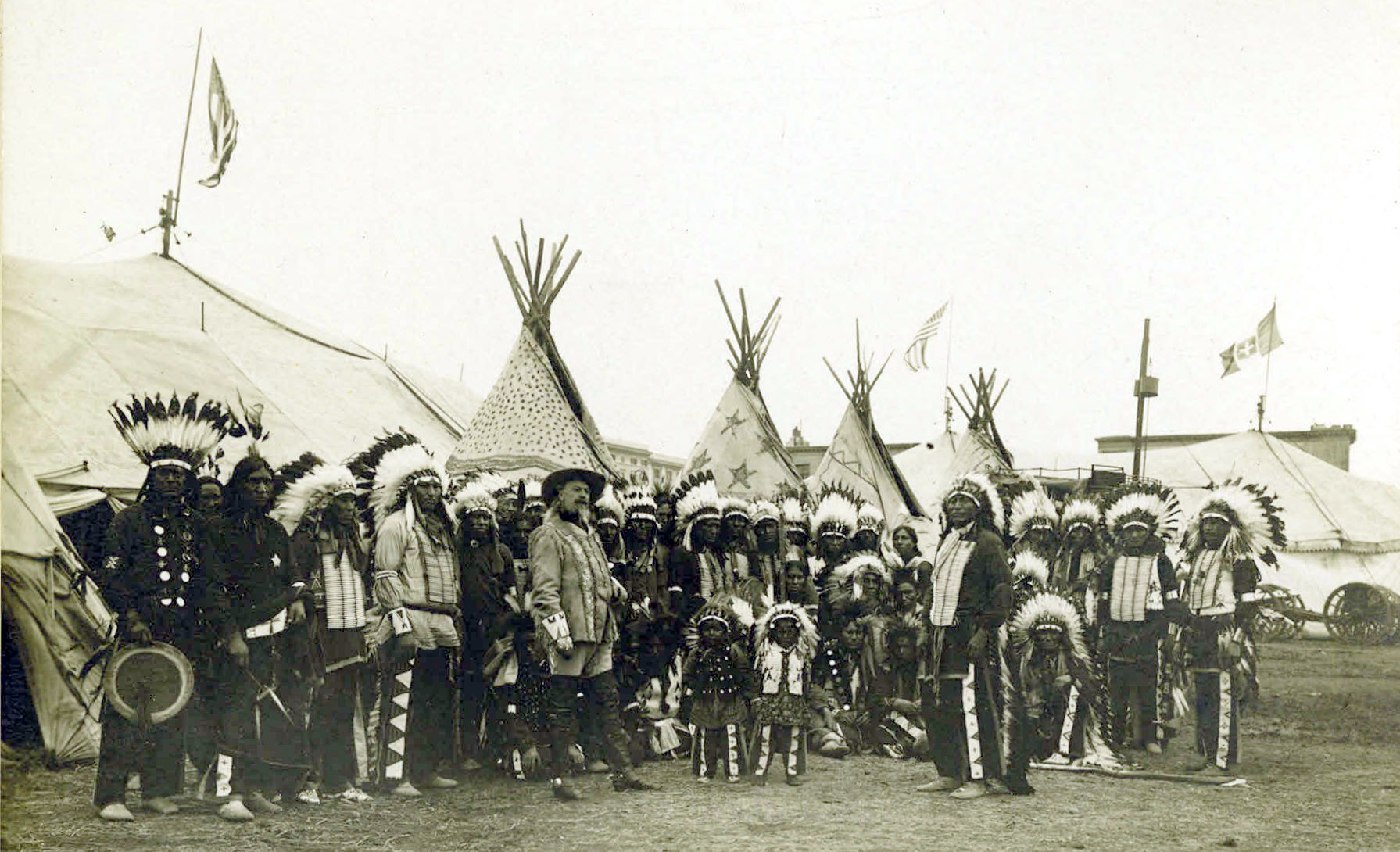
The Buffalo Bill Wild West Show in 1890, taking place in the Bois de Boulogne in Paris, France.

Dallin conceived the sculpture while studying in Paris at the Académie Julian with Henri Michel Chapu from 1888-1890. During this time, he made frequent visits to Buffalo Bill's Wild West Show, which was playing in the Bois de Boulogne. Rosa Bonheur, who worked alongside Dallin during this time, was similarly intrigued by the show and made sketches of Buffalo Bill with other Indigenous people, horses, and buffalo. Dallin elected to create a life-size equestrian statue depicting a Sioux Indian chief, using Philip, son of Kicking Bear, as the model for the statue.

He first completed a plaster version of the statue and entered it into the Paris Salon of 1890, where it won honorable mention, which was uncommon for an American artist to receive at the time. He then paid for a bronze version of the sculpture to be cast in Paris. The bronze was later exhibited at the 1893 World's Columbian Exposition. The Chicago judge Lambert Tree purchased this version of the sculpture and donated it to Lincoln Park, where it was dedicated on June 9, 1894.

== Visual properties ==
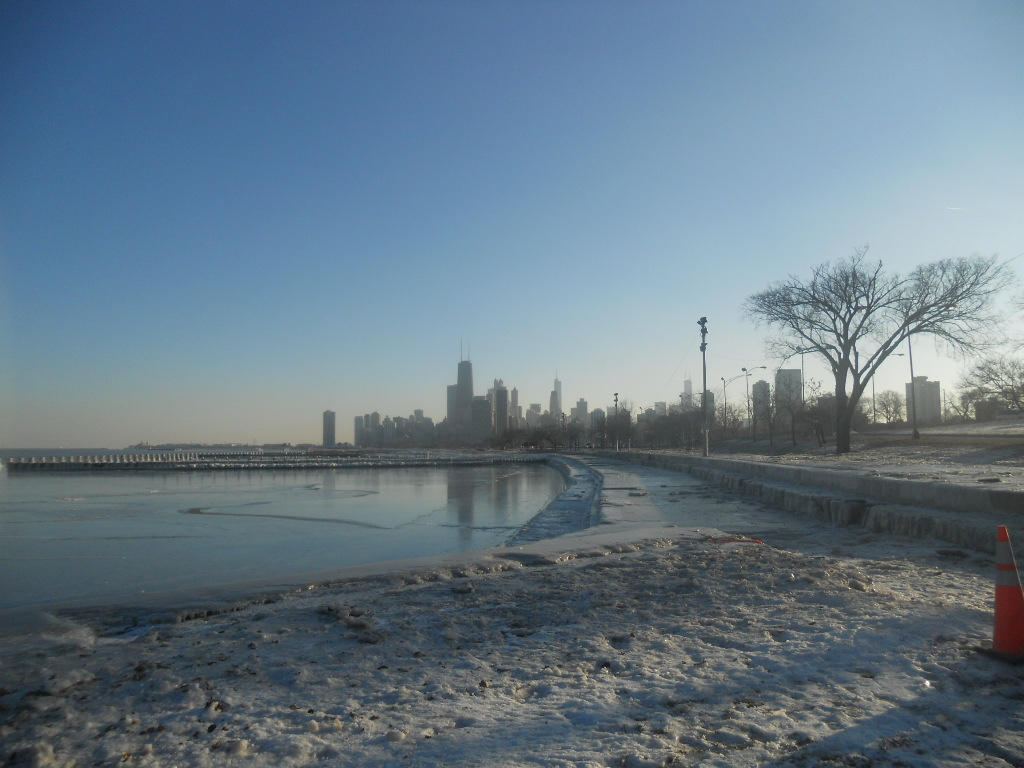
View of Lake Michigan from Lincoln Park in Chicago, Illinois.

The monument is a life-size bronze statue that depicts a Native American man who is barely clothed with just moccasins, a loincloth, and a feathered headpiece, riding on top of a horse. His left arm rests on the horse's neck, while his other hand is stretched upward holding a long spear. The expression on the individual's face is one of a friendly and welcoming nature, thought to be representing the first meeting with the Europeans who were colonizing North America. The statue is raised on a high granite pedestal, with a plaque reading: "A SIGNAL OF PEACE" with "The Gift of Lambert Tree" directly underneath. The statue overlooks the shore of Lake Michigan.

== Political contestation ==
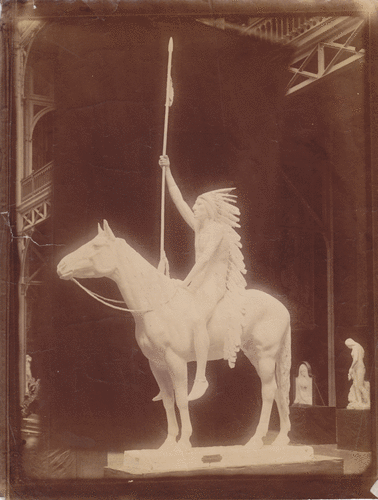
A Signal of Peace displayed at the Paris Salon of 1890.

A Signal of Peace, along with the three other monuments that make up The Epic of the Indian, has been criticized as contributing to the depiction of Native Americans as a "defeated and dying race," supporting the "vanishing race mythology."

However, Dallin's unpublished manuscripts, newspaper interviews, and old letters have been used as evidence that he was an advocate for the American indigenous people, and critiqued their mistreatment by white settlers. A reviewer in 1909 even praised Dallin for his work with Native Americans, saying that "Mr. Dallin knows the Indian psychically as well as physically. He has not only put himself inside his skin, as we say, but he has climbed into his consciousness and studied the way his kind works."

While Dallin's intentions in representing Native Americans were initially viewed in positive terms, more recently his work has been critiqued as art that silences the voices of Native Americans, and overshadows their agency. It has also been pointed out that Dallin has made several generalizations in blending together different tribal cultures. For example, The Protest of the Sioux is intended to represent the struggles and adversity of all of the western tribes in the U.S., but the end-title of the work just represents the Sioux people. Since Dallin never made any published statement regarding the correct interpretation of these works, it shows that he did not immediately strike down the interpretations that involved the "vanishing race mythology," possibly to gain favor with white patrons and increase the marketability of his work.

The art historian Emily C. Burns argues that it is important to distinguish between the "intention and reception" of Dallin's work. She emphasizes that Dallin's statues were created as "ambivalent monuments that posed a subtle political challenge for those willing to engage in imaginative, critical looking." But she acknowledges that they have come to be perceived by many as problematic and disrespectful to the Native American people.

== See also ==
- List of public art in Chicago
- Cyrus Dallin Art Museum
