= Protest of the Sioux =

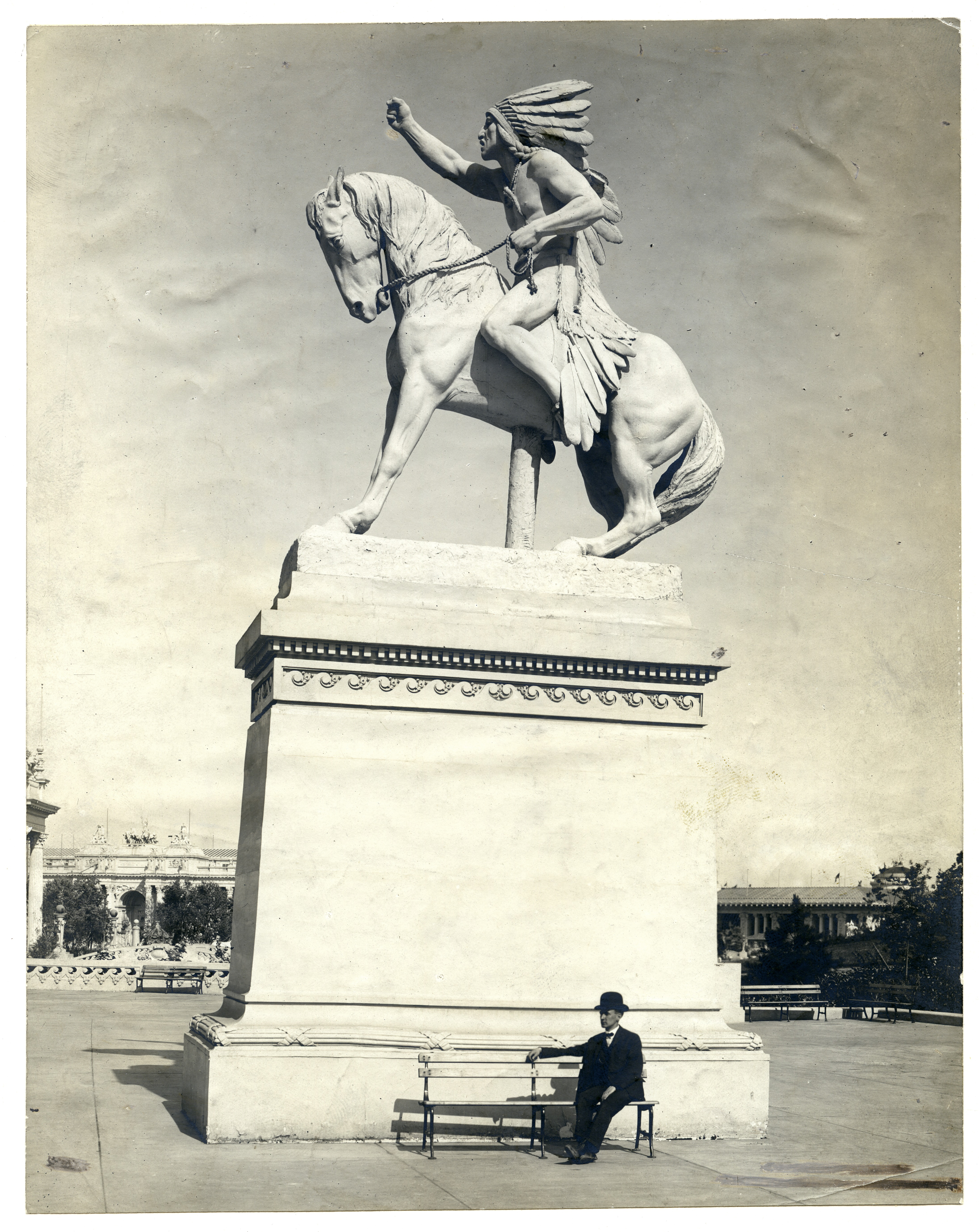
Protest of the Sioux (1904), at the 1904 St. Louis World's Fair

Protest of the Sioux, also known as The Protest, is a 1904 equestrian statue by Cyrus Dallin. It was the third of four important statues of indigenous people on horseback commonly known as The Epic of the Indian, which also includes A Signal of Peace (1890), The Medicine Man (1899), and Appeal to the Great Spirit (1908).

The statue depicts a mounted Sioux warrior wearing a war bonnet defiantly shaking his right fist. According to Rell G. Francis, it depicts "a Sioux chief vigorously protesting the confiscation of his lands and buffalo by the white man".

A monumental version made of staff was exhibited at the Louisiana Purchase Exposition, held in St. Louis, Missouri in 1904, where it won a gold medal. The temporary statue was retained after the exhibition, but rapidly deteriorated. Unlike the three other statues in the series, Protest of the Sioux was never cast as a full-size bronze, so it survives only in statuette form. Bronzes 20 in (51 cm) high were cast by Gorham Manufacturing Company in the early 1900s, and a similar bronze is at the Springville Museum of Art in Springville, Utah. It was cast in 1986 from a bronze version made by Dallin in 1903 which is held by the Museum of Fine Arts, Boston. An example of the 20 in (51 cm) bronze statuette was sold at Christie's in 2006 for US$36,000.

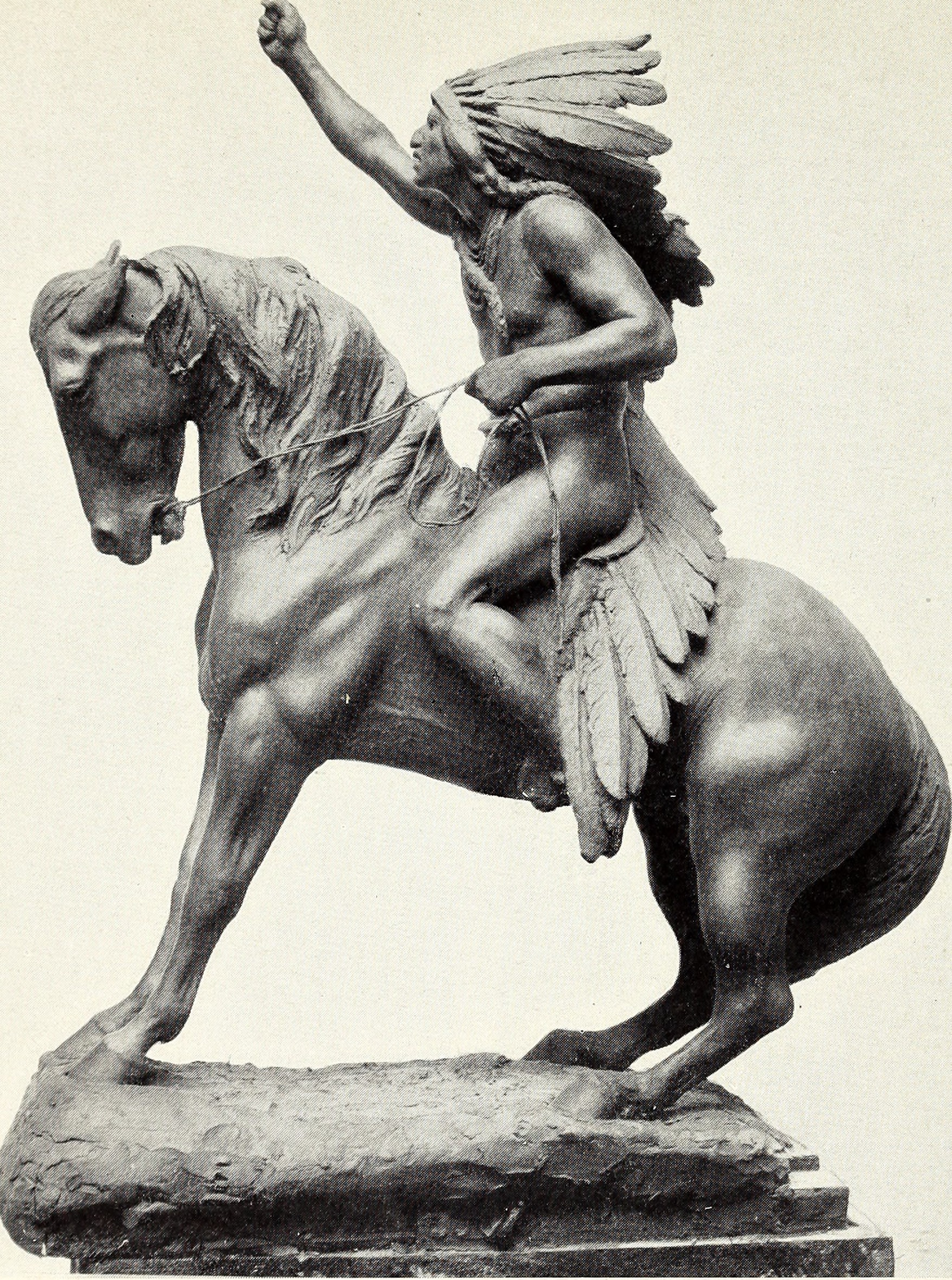
1912 illustration from The New England Magazine

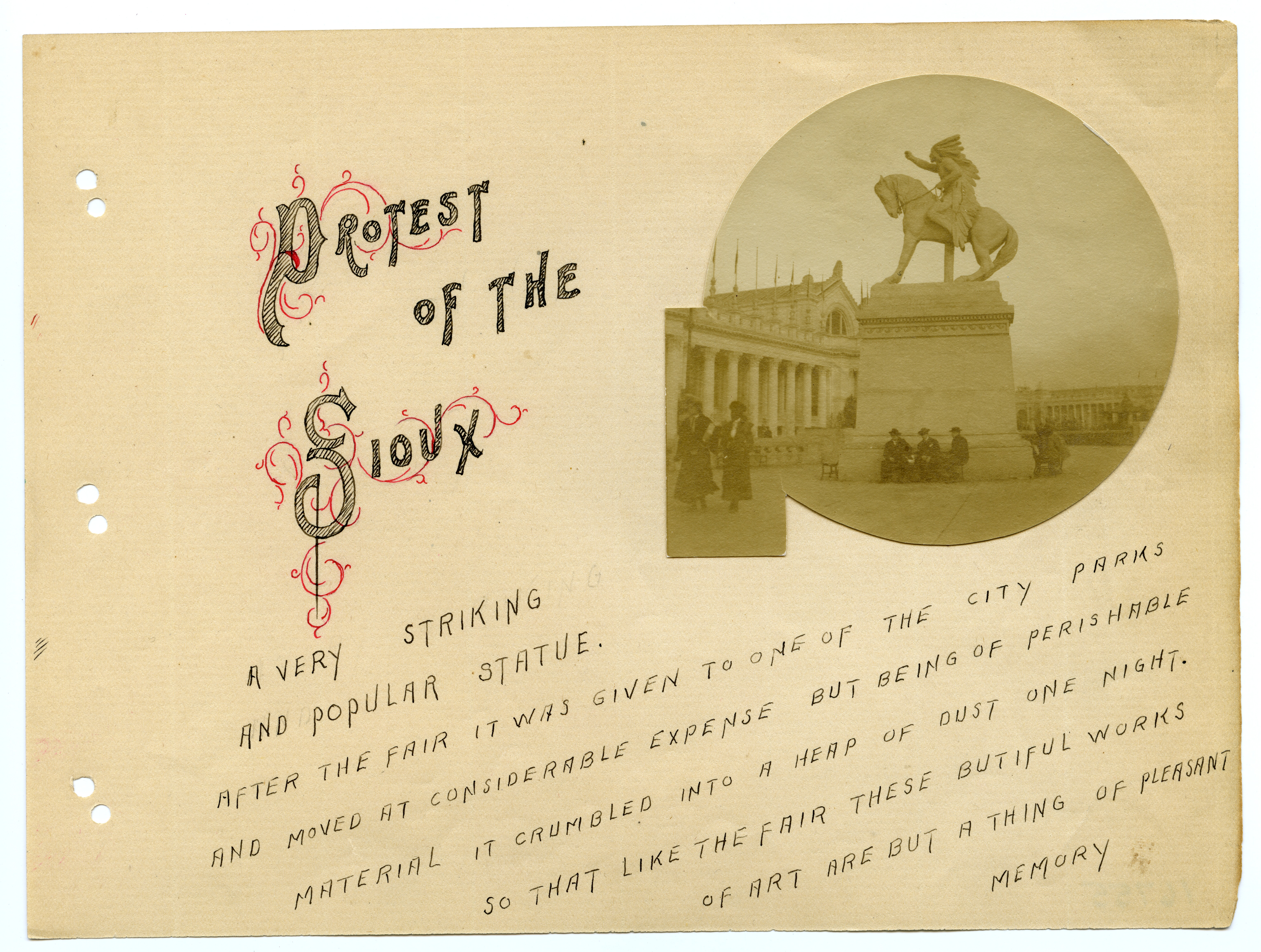
Album page with inscription
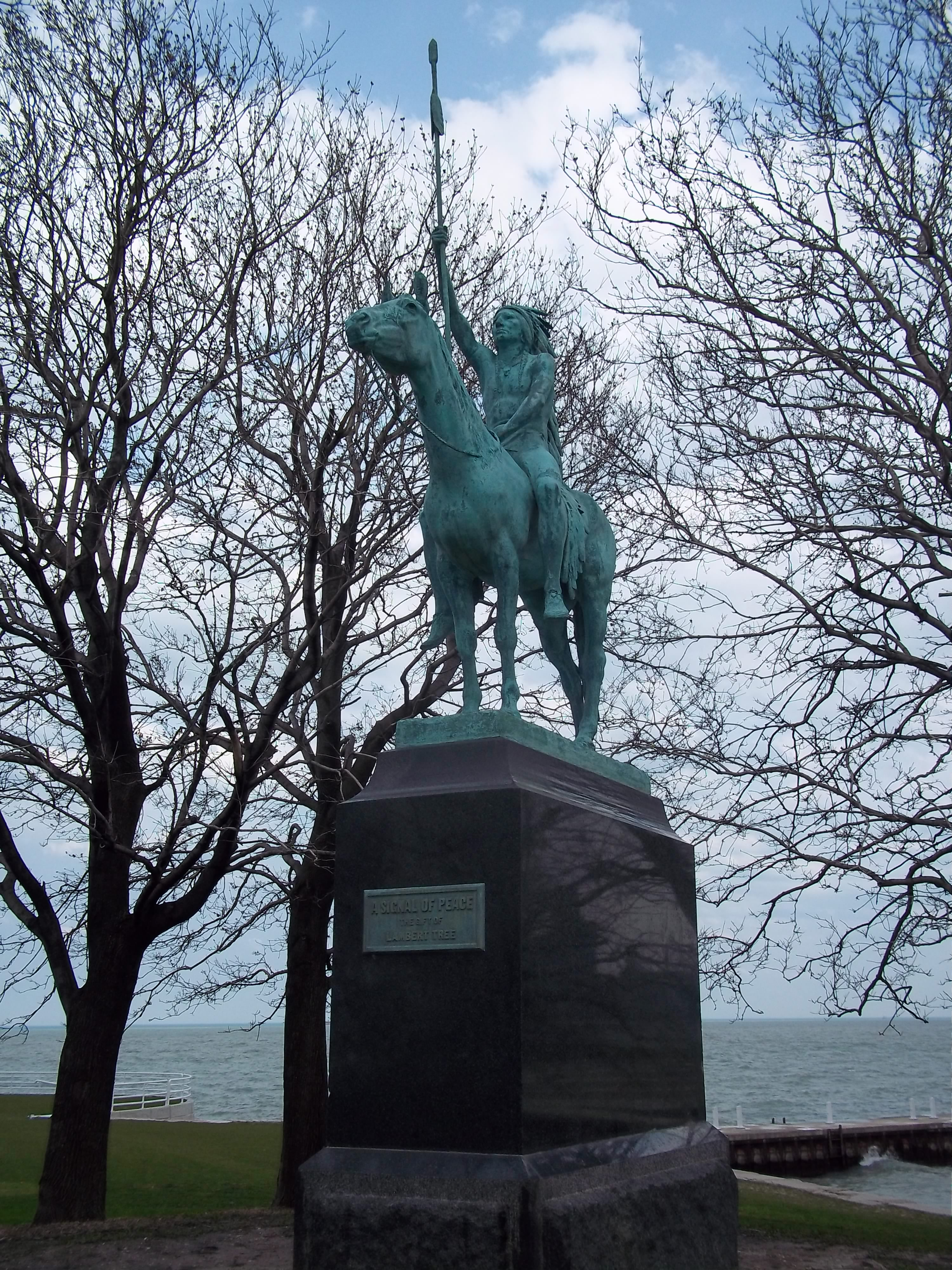
Signal of Peace (1890)

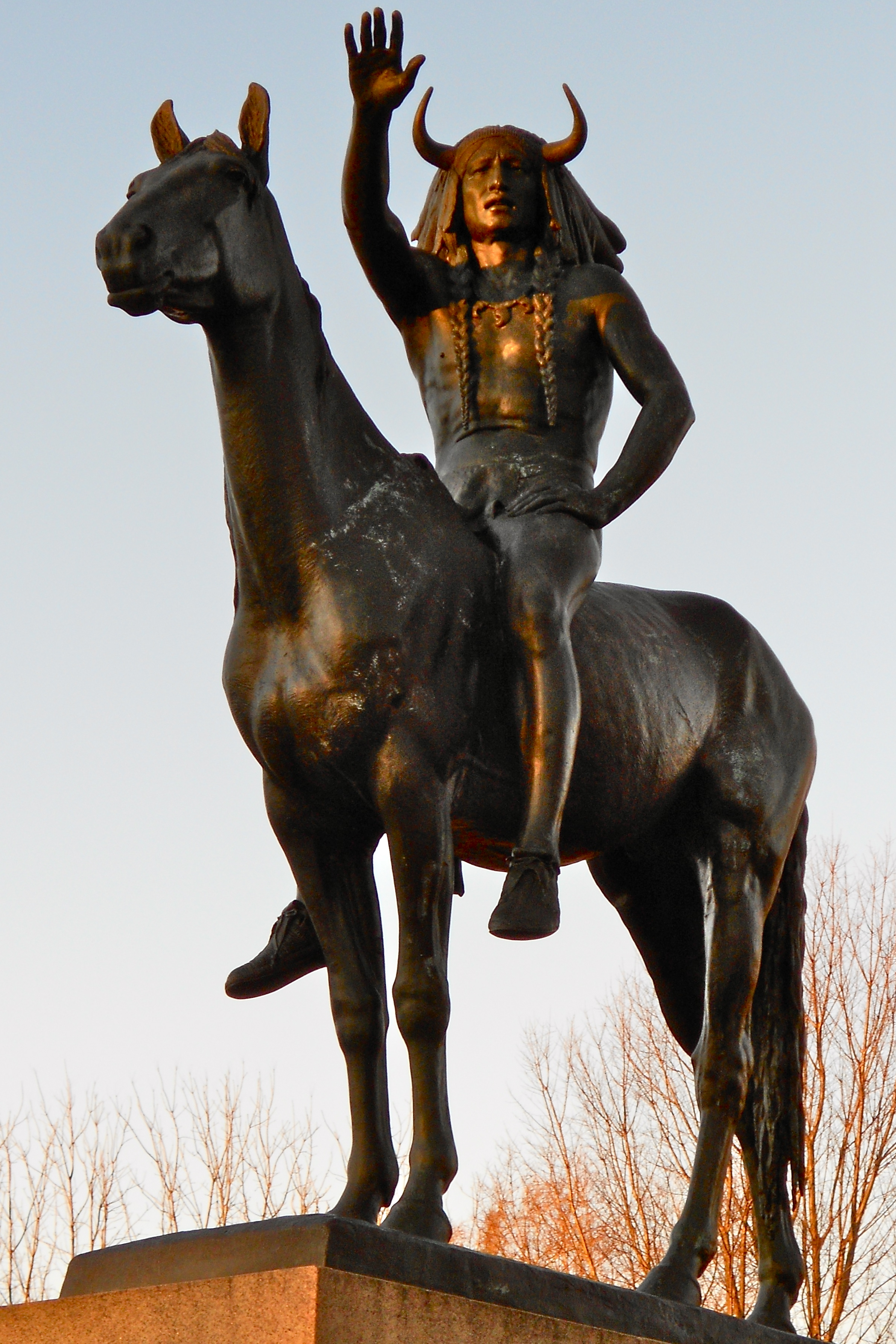
The Medicine Man (1899)

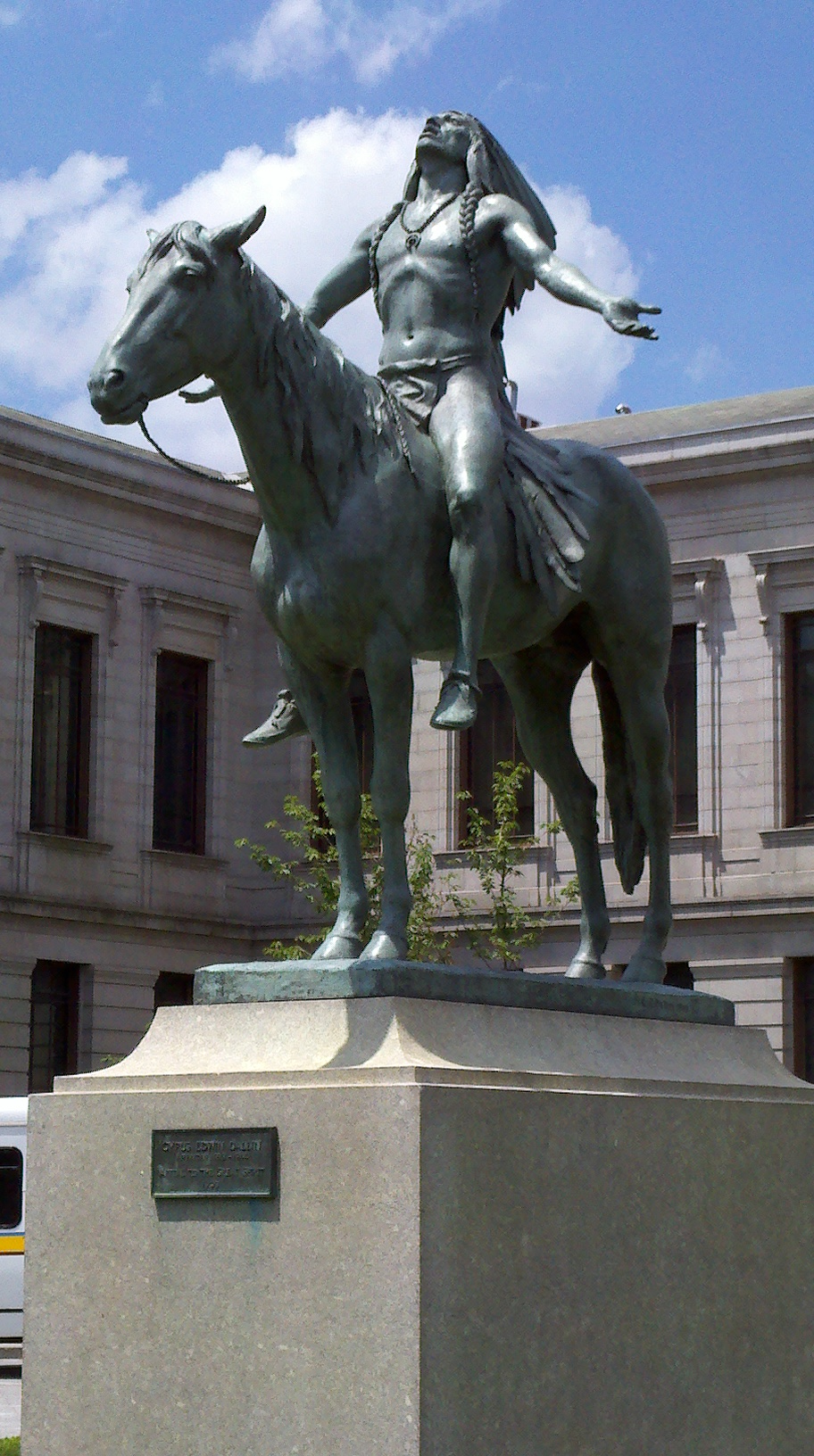
Appeal to the Great Spirit (1908)
