= Wysor Heights Historic District =

Historic district in Indiana, United States

- U.S. National Register of Historic Places
- U.S. Historic district
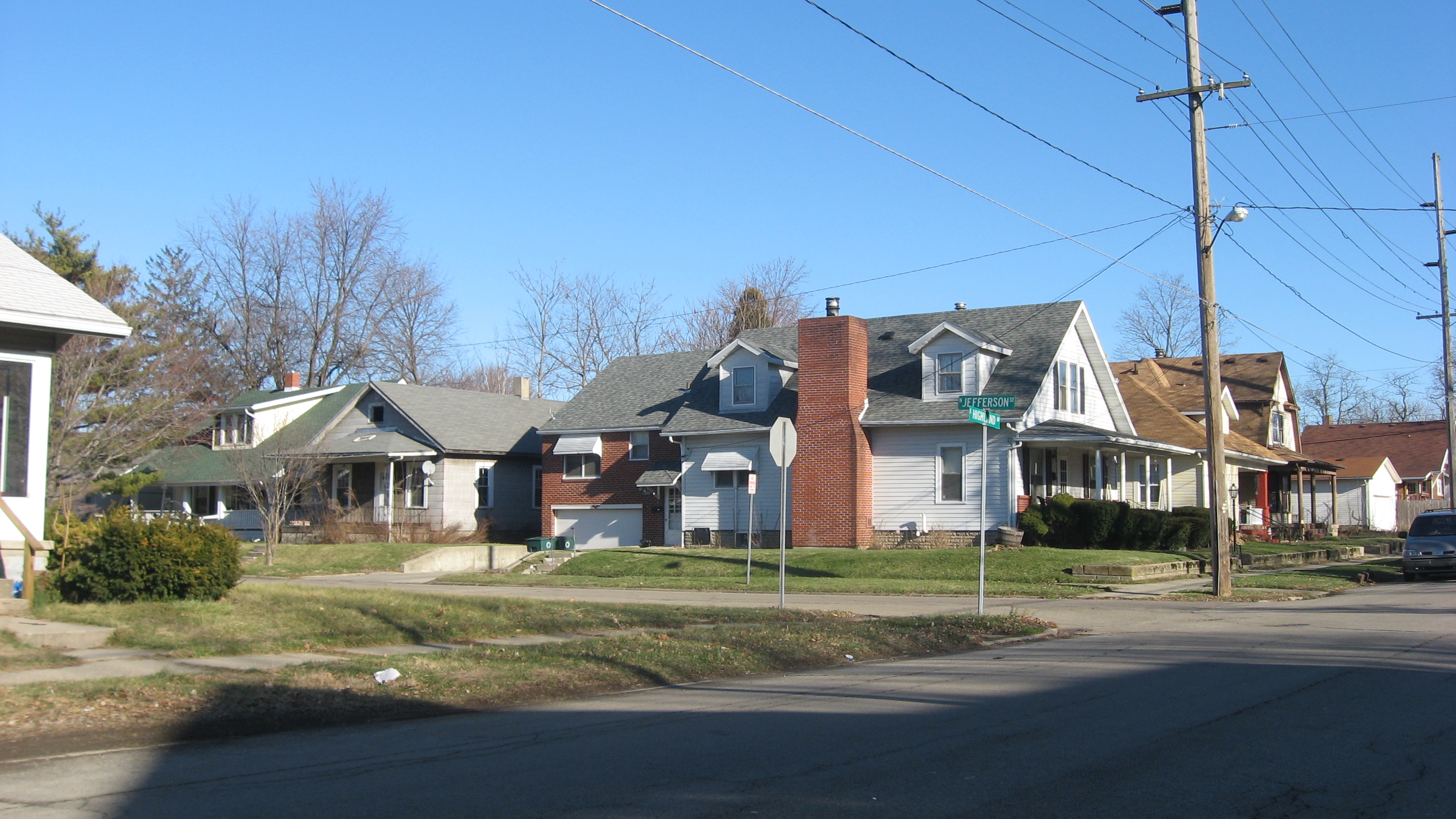
- Wysor Heights in Muncie, January 2012

- Location within Indiana Location within the United States
- Location: Roughly bounded by Highland Ave., White River, N. Elm St. and N. Walnut St., Muncie, Indiana
- Coordinates: 40°12′18″N 85°23′01″W
- Area: 23 acres (9.3 ha)
- Built: 1883
- Architect: Dallin, Cyrus E.
- Architectural style: Bungalow/craftsman, Queen Anne, Foursquare
- NRHP reference No.: 88001217
- Added to NRHP: November 1, 1988

Wysor Heights Historic District is a national historic district located at Muncie, Indiana. It encompasses 61 contributing buildings, 1 contributing site, and 1 contributing object in a predominantly residential section of Muncie. The district developed between about 1890 and 1930, and includes notable examples of Queen Anne, American Foursquare, and Bungalow / American Craftsman style architecture. Notable contributing resources include the equestrian sculpture and landscape ensemble "Appeal to the Great Spirit" by Cyrus Edwin Dallin (1929), Roy Thomas House (1922–1923), Burt Whiteley House (1892), and the first Delaware County Children's Home building (c. 1890).

It was added to the National Register of Historic Places in 1988.
