= The Medicine Man (Dallin) =

Sculpture by Cyrus Edwin Dallin installed in Philadelphia, Pennsylvania, U.S.

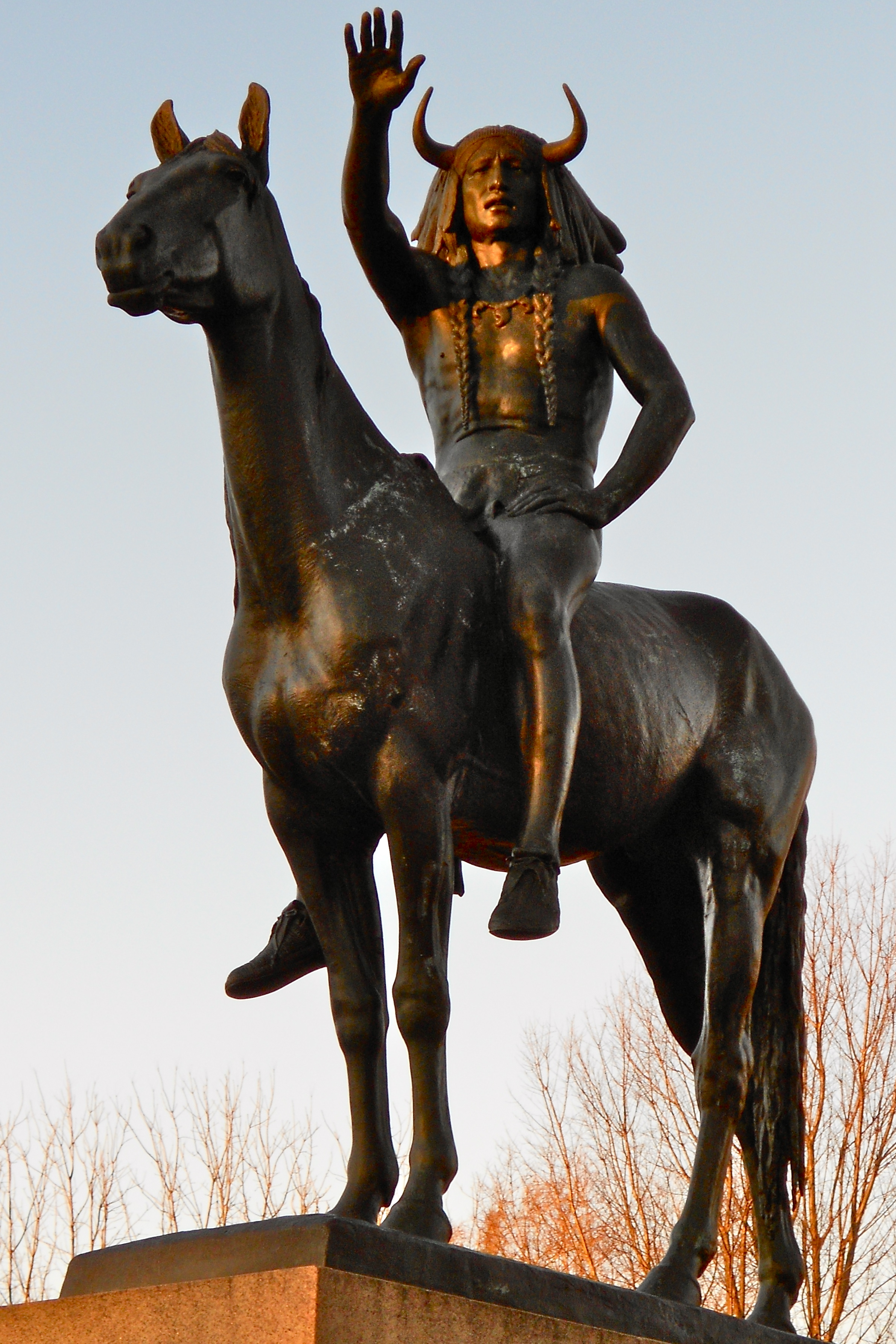
- The Medicine Man, a Cyrus Edwin Dallin statue in Fairmount Park in Philadelphia, in December 2011
- Artist: Cyrus Edwin Dallin
- Year: 1899
- Type: Bronze
- Dimensions: 240 cm (96 in)
- Location: Philadelphia, Pennsylvania, U.S.; 39°59′31.2″N 75°11′11.44″W
- Owner: City of Philadelphia; Fairmount Park Commission

The Medicine Man is an 1899 bronze equestrian statue by Cyrus Edwin Dallin located on Dauphin Street, west of 33rd Street, in Fairmount Park in Philadelphia. The statue portrays an indigenous American medicine man.

The Medicine Man is the second of four prominent sculptures of indigenous people on horseback known as The Epic of the Indian, which also includes A Signal of Peace (1890), Protest of the Sioux (1904), and Appeal to the Great Spirit (1908).

== History ==
The Medicine Man, cast in 1899, was exhibited at the 1899 Paris Salon, where it was placed away from other sculptures against a "background of greenery," which was meant to confer honor. The statue was praised by international critics, and was a favorite among visitors. A year later, it won a silver medal at the 1900 Paris Exposition Universelle. The Austrian government sought to purchase the statue, but it was ultimately purchased by the Association for Public Art (formerly the Fairmount Park Art Association) in Philadelphia, Pennsylvania, for $6,000. Dallin himself selected the site for the sculpture in East Fairmount Park.

At the time Dallin began working on his first Native American monument, A Signal of Peace, in 1889 in Paris, Buffalo Bill's Wild West Show was based out of Neuilly, France for seven months. Dallin made "life drawings of several of these performers," who were mostly Lakotas, and these drawings served as the models for A Signal of Peace. The model for The Medicine Man is unknown, but the Association for Public Art in Philadelphia associates Buffalo Bill's Wild West Shows with Dallin's production of Native American sculptures in France.

The context of the "growing European interest in representations of American Indians spurred by Buffalo Bill's Wild West tours" informs European attraction to Dallin's work, especially the Austrian government's interest in purchasing The Medicine Man.

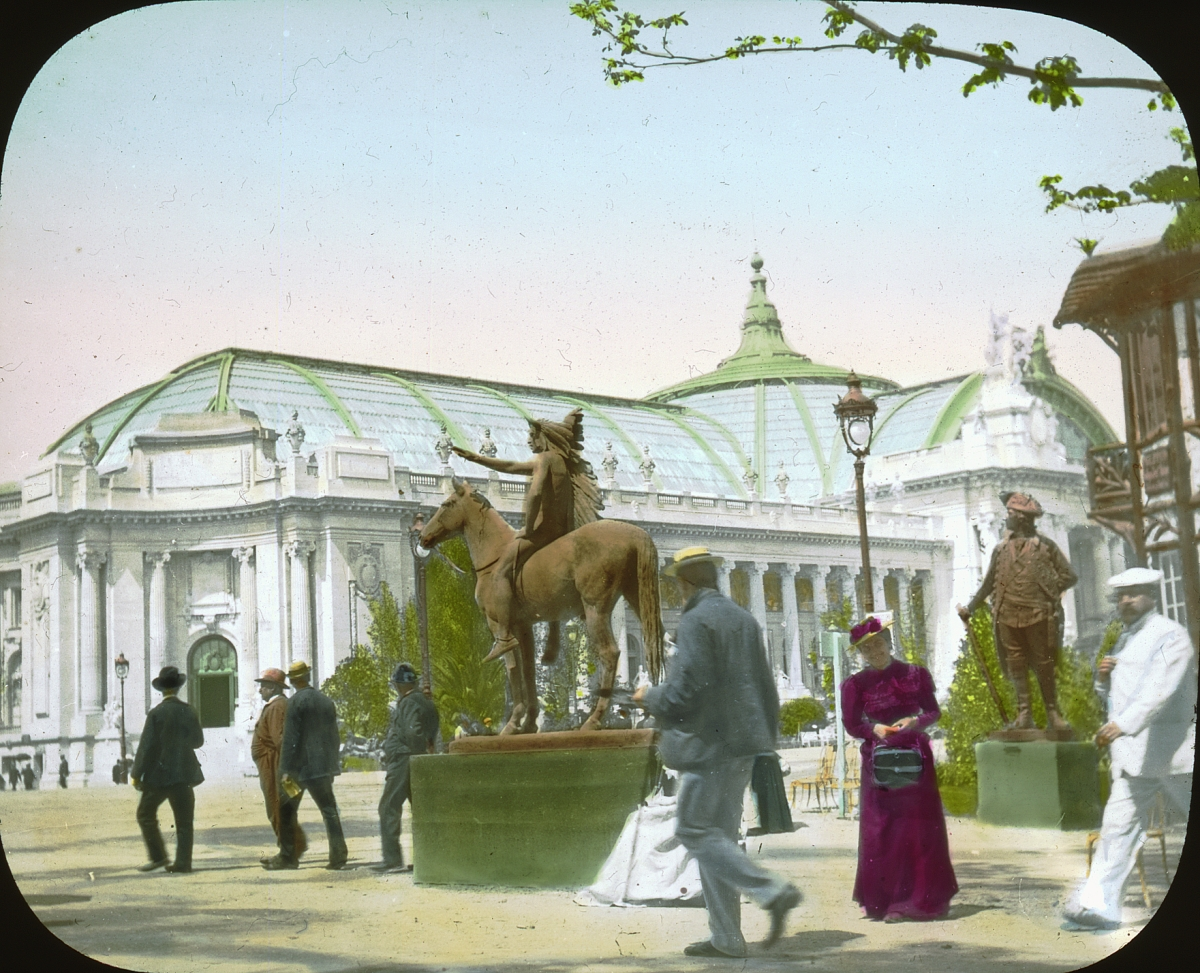
The Medicine Man at the Paris Exposition Universelle in 1900

Dallin's vocalized opposition to US policies surrounding treatment of Native Americans and his experience growing up in Utah also shaped his interest in Native American subjects.

Like many of Dallin's most popular works, The Medicine Man was not done on commission. John C. Ewers, an ethnologist who specialized in the American Plains Indians, asserts that Dallin executed so many works on speculation because he felt "impelled to do so," and found "little difficulty in finding a market for them."

A reduced edition was produced by the Gorham Foundry. An example cast by the Gruet foundry in Paris is in the Amon Carter Museum.

=== Dedication ===
The statue was unveiled by the Fairmount Park Art Association on December 10, 1903 at the 32nd annual meeting of the Association. Francis La Flesche, an ethnologist and member of the Omaha Nation, gave an address titled "Who Was the Medicine Man?" at the dedication. He praised Dallin's work for representing the true character of the medicine man in Native American culture, emphasizing the dignity and strength manifested in the physical characteristics:

I cannot discuss, from the standpoint of an artist, the Medicine Man as he is here portrayed by your sculptor, but, in the serious expression, the dignified bearing, the strength of pose, I recognize the character of the true Medicine Man (Applause)--he who was the mediator between his people and the great Spirit. The statue at once brings back vividly to my mind the scenes of my early youth, scenes that I shall never again see in their reality. This reopening of the past to me would never have been possible, had not your artist risen above the distorting influence of the prejudice one race is apt to feel toward another and been gifted with the imagination to discern the truth which underlies a strange exterior.

The President of the Board of Commissioners of Fairmount Park, Col. A. Louden Snow, gave a speech as he received the statue on behalf of the Fairmount Park Commission. When describing The Medicine Man, he said it is a "beautiful thing--suggestive, perfect in type and form and nothing about it that can do anything else but interest those who look upon it." James MacAlister, a Chairman on the Board of Commissioners for the park, gave a speech presenting The Medicine Man to the Mayor of Philadelphia and the President of the Board of Commissioners (Snow). MacAlister praised the statue's balance of realism and idealization:

I am glad that Mr. Dallin, while he has not departed from the Indian, has given us the idealization of the Indian character, as best manifested by the Medicine Man [...] I congratulate the city of Philadelphia in having within its borders a work of art at once so beautiful, so full of interest to us, and one which I think will have lasting value.

MacAlister further paused to touch on the "tragedy" and "tragic fate" of Native Americans, stating "I think it is a great thing for us to do, a great tribute to the race which received us here--a great thing for ourselves to do to put upon our hearthstone so beautiful a statue to remind us of its history and of its character."

=== Related in Fairmount Park ===
Several other works were "commissioned or acquired" by the city of Philadelphia commemorating the "spirit of the American West" around the time The Medicine Man was acquired at the turn of the twentieth century. Also in Fairmount Park are John J. Boyle's Stone Age in America (1887) and Frederic Remington's Cowboy (1908).

== Description ==
The Medicine Man is a bronze equestrian statue depicting a Western Plains Indian on horseback. The figure is wearing a horned feathered war bonnet, a headdress with spiritual significance, typically worn by Plains Indians for ceremonial purposes. His hair is in two long braids. His right arm is raised upwards, his mouth is open, and his brow appears "furrowed in concentration." The figure is meant to represent the traditional medicine man, a spiritual leader and healer in Native American cultures.

In his dedication speech, Francis La Flesche discussed some of the physical attributes of The Medicine Man. Specifically, he elaborated on the nudity of the figure:

The representation of the Medicine Man as a nude figure is not a mere fancy of the artist, for in many of the religious rites the priest appeared in such manner. This nudity is not without its significance, it typifies the utter helplessness of man, when strength is contrasted with the power of the Great Spirit, whose power is symbolized by the horns upon the head of the priest.

La Flesche's speech provides a religious context to understanding the nudity of the figure in relation with the figure's horns.

== Reception ==
The Medicine Man has received a range of assessments and interpretations in the years since its creation. It has been variously viewed as a stand-alone sculpture; as a part of a chronological series by Dallin; and in the context of the artist's relationship with the Native American community. Lorado Taft, a contemporary sculptor of Dallin's, "paid high tribute" to Dallin's work. In his 1924 book History of American Sculpture, Taft wrote that "Mr. Dallin knows the horse and he knows the Indian, he also knows how to model." He found The Medicine Man to be "one of the most notable and significant products of American sculpture," and that Dallin's "mounted Indians are among the most interesting public monuments in this country." Commentary on Dallin's Native American works has been more critical in recent years, with particular attention to the way his work contributes to the vanishing race myth.

=== Relationship with Dallin's other works in Epic of the Indian series ===
The Medicine Man has been historically interpreted by art historians as the second sculpture in a series of four by Dallin, called The Epic of the Indian. The series of four has been interpreted as symbolizing and perpetuating the vanishing race myth, which presumes the vanishing of American Indians as a result of Western expansion and assimilation policies in the United States. In the early twentieth century, these four sculptures were interpreted chronologically to represent "the fate" of Native Americans from "the time of the entrance of the white man to the dying of the Indian race."

The four sculptures of the series are, in chronological order, A Signal of Peace (1890), The Medicine Man (1899), Protest of the Sioux (1904), and Appeal to the Great Spirit (1908). John C. Ewers found The Medicine Man to be "more strongly modeled than A Signal of Peace," indicating the "maturing of Dallin's powers as a sculptor."

Some art historians have questioned the idea that these four sculptures were intended to represent the vanishing race myth in a chronological series. Emily Burns suggests that Dallin did not intend for these four works to represent a narrative sequence; rather, this interpretation came from a "period reading of Dallin's sculptures as depicting a defeated and dying race," which became common in 1907, and has "shaped succeeding scholarship on the artist's work." She maintains that, while this interpretation can be "sustained," the sculptures can also be read as "equivocal monuments that challenge conventional historical accounts." Burns bases this interpretation on Dallin's record of challenging of US imperialism, his "unease with the discourse of assimilation," and his use of "his words and his art to criticize US treatment of Native communities during western expansion." She further supports this view by interpreting Dallin's Native American figures as being "active" and dynamic, rather than "static" figures that "adhered to the expectations concerning the so-called dying race."

Burns acknowledges that Dallin was aware of the "interpretations of his work that framed it in terms of vanishing race mythology," and he did not "overtly object" to this view, likely because "such criticism enhanced the marketability of his projects among white patrons."

=== Interpretations ===
The Medicine Man itself has often been seen through the lens of the vanishing race ideology. Alvan F. Sanborn, a journalist, identified The Medicine Man's role in this chronological series as a figure that "foresees the approaching ruin and ultimate extinction of his people and is striving, with little more chance of success than Cassandra of Troy, to ward them against impending catastrophe." This identification is echoed by others, such as Ewers, who sees The Medicine Man as a "visionary seer who warned his people of threatening danger from the newcomers."

Similarly, in a review of the four sculptures that make up Dallin's series, E. Wilbur Pomeroy interprets The Medicine Man as the statue that "sounds the note of warning." He observes:

The Medicine Man at Fairmount Park, Philadelphia, is Dallin's second portrayal of the Red Man's history as he tells it in bronze. The medicine man holds up his hand warningly. He is the seer of his people. He warns that the white faces are not to be trusted. Even the horse stands with upraised ears, vigilant. Both foretell the inevitable that has driven the North American Indian toward the sunset.

Art historian Emily Burns complicates these interpretations, arguing that "whereas Signal of Peace offered the sitter agency through the act of negotiation, Medicine Man gave him a metaphorical voice" and that while the "political context has not emerged as clearly as that of Signal of Peace," The Medicine Man is "significant for its celebration of Native Spirituality and tribal leadership in the context of assimilation."

=== Criticism ===
Recent criticism of The Medicine Man has focused on its role in perpetuating the vanishing race ideology. Dallin's sculptures have also been criticized for its generalization of Native American culture. Burns emphasizes Dallin's "elision of tribal differences and invocation of standard types," which "comprised his critique of white America's treatment of Native peoples." Specifically, she points to his conflation of unique Plains Indians cultures within a singular sculptural figure. Furthermore, she points out that Dallin "perpetuated dominant white narratives concerning Native peoples by drawing on the common nineteenth-century sculptural practice of depicting the noble American Indian on horseback."

In 2020, an article in The Philadelphia Inquirer about Native American representations called attention to several sculptures of Native Americans in the area, including The Medicine Man. The article especially pointed out those representations wearing Western Plains headdresses, which would have been "not generally worn in the East." While The Medicine Man was intended to depict a Western Plains Indian, a Western Plains Indian would not have been found in the East of the US around Philadelphia. Regarding these statues of Native Americans in Philadelphia, Margaret Bruchac, the coordinator of the Native American and Indigenous Studies program at the University of Pennsylvania, remarked that "these statues are not made to represent or talk to living Native people, they're made to talk to tourists and visitors."

=== Cyrus Dallin and Native Americans ===
Cyrus Dallin's relationship with the Native American community throughout his life provides context for his focus on Native Americans in his sculptures. Dallin grew up in a small settlement in Springville, Utah, and played with the Native American children of the surrounding Ute Indians that frequently traded with the Springville settlement. As an adult, Dallin became "outspoken in his criticism of American Indian policy" and made both public and private statements expressing his detestation of US treatment of Native Americans. His wife, Vittoria Colonna Murray, noted in an unpublished manuscript that Dallin "felt his mission was to prove [American Indians'] great qualities and show how America's treatment of them was a blot on the escutcheon." Dallin furthermore "sought out many opportunities to educate white audiences on the truth of history and their own 'complacency and self righteousness.'" In 1921, he gave a speech in Lowell, Massachusetts, in which he stated, "we have dishonored ourselves, distorted facts, and turned the Indian from a friend to a foe." Dallin also "served as president of the Massachusetts branch of the Eastern Association of Indian Affairs, a national organization that partnered with Native and non-Native groups on efforts to protect land rights and sovereignty, improve healthcare and education, and revitalize Native arts among Indigenous nations."

Art historian William Howe Downes found that Dallin's Native American sculptures were "a direct, natural, and inevitable outgrowth of his youthful Western experiences in close contact with the red man, his admiration for their character, and his pity for their misfortunes, and not merely the deliberate intellectual objective illustration of an effective theme for statuary."

== See also ==
The four sculptures representing The Epic of the Indian

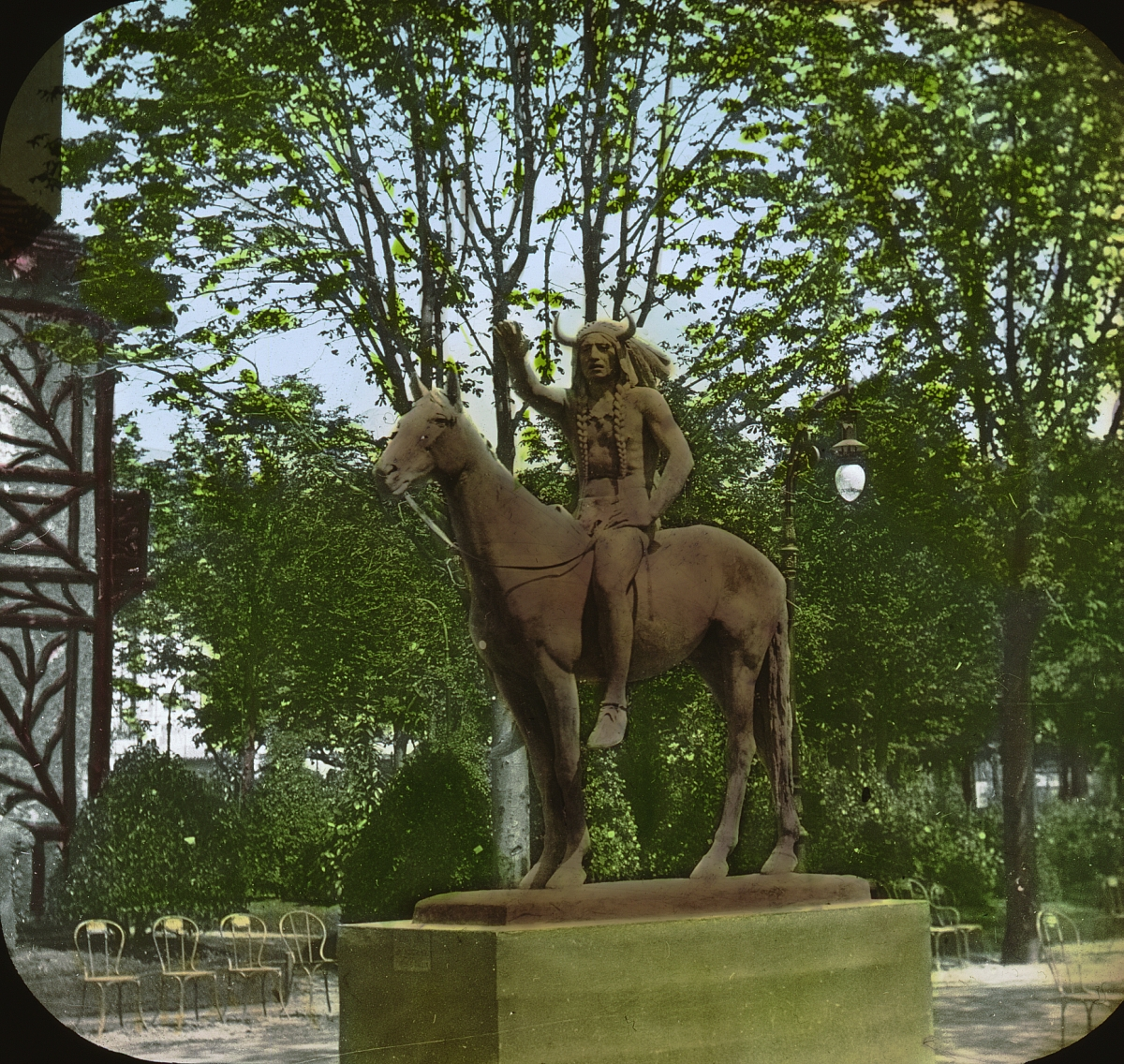
The Medicine Man at the 1900 Exposition Universelle

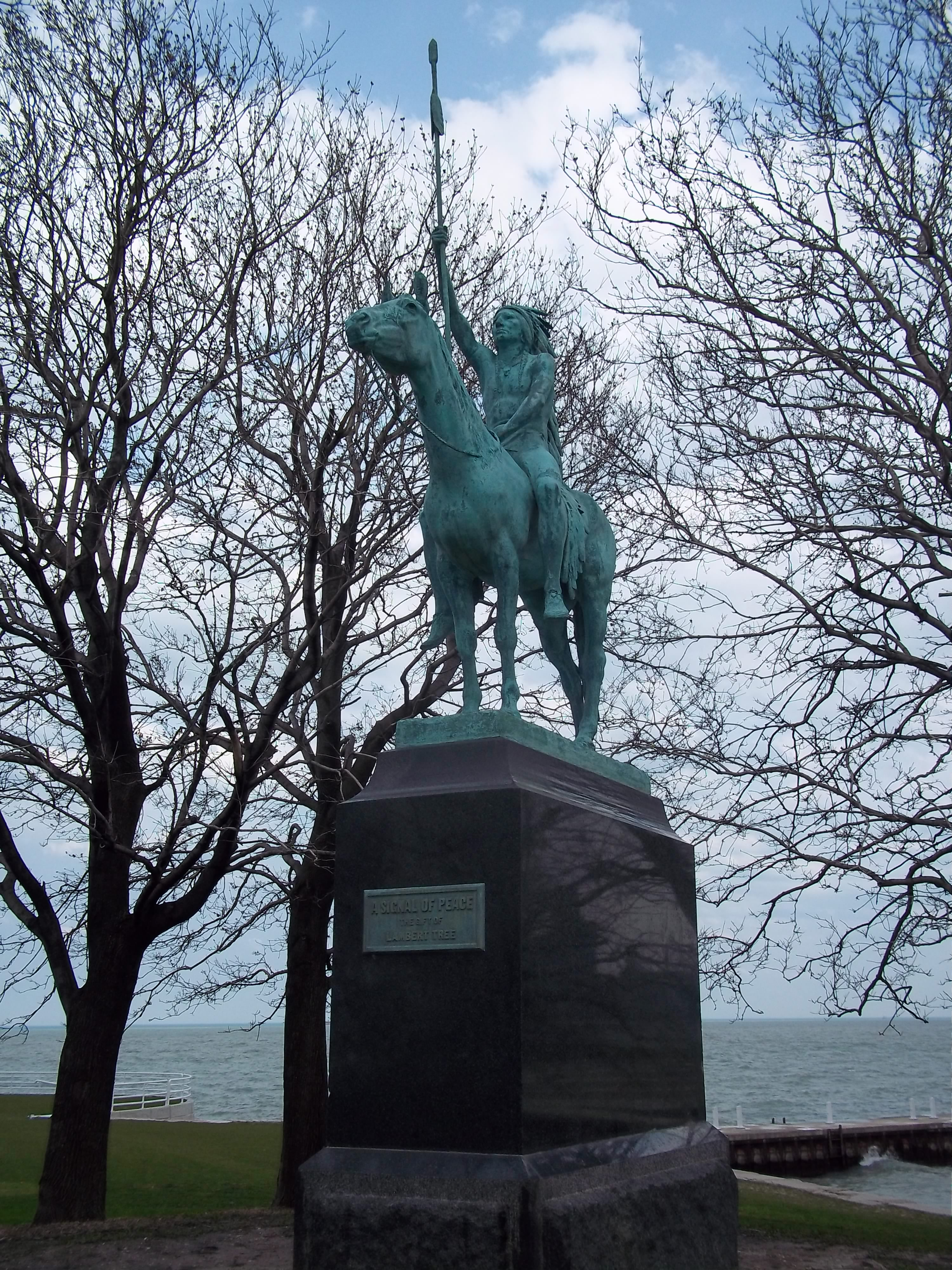
Signal of Peace (1890)

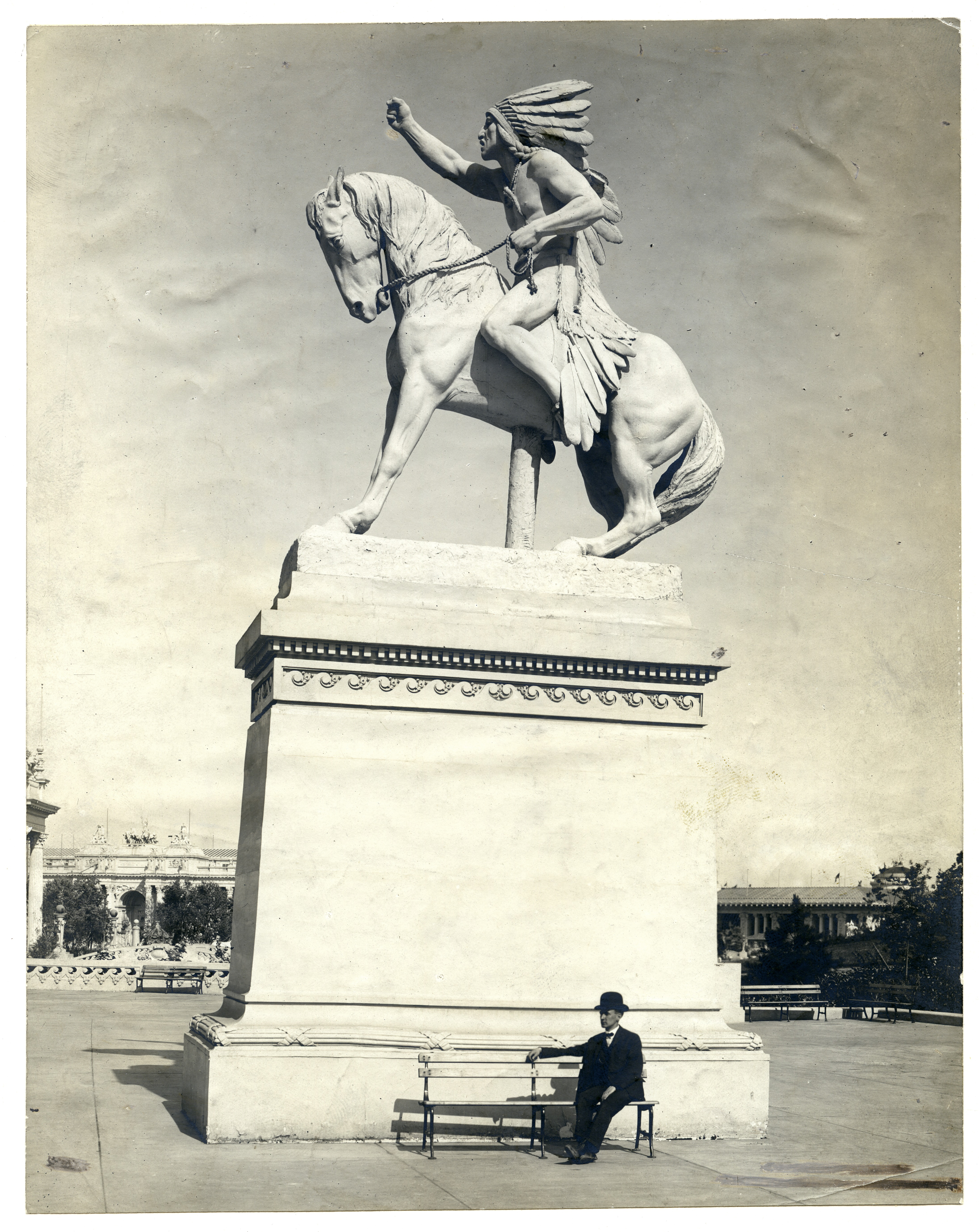
Protest of the Sioux (1904)

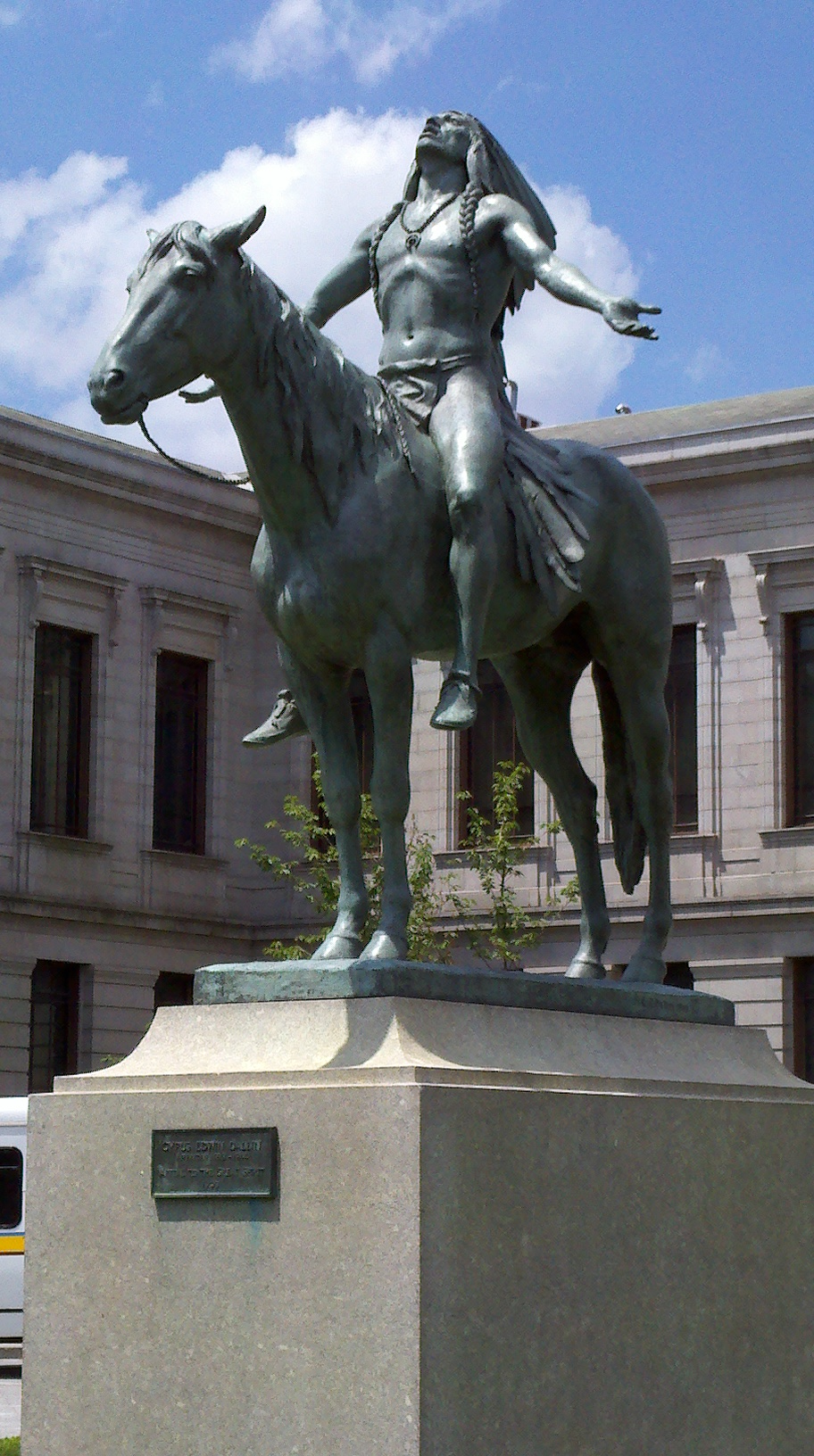
Appeal to the Great Spirit (1908)

List of public art in Philadelphia
