= Billy Lang =

American lyricist and publisher (1883–1944)

Billy Lang (né William August Leng; 28 May 1883 in Boston – 23 December 1944 in San Francisco) was a lyricist and music publisher active in Boston from 1910 to 1930.

== Biography ==
Billy Lang was born "William Albert Leng" to Albert and Theresa Leng, who had immigrated to Boston from Germany in 1880. William retained the spelling “Leng” at least through his 1912 entry in the Boston city directory but thereafter used the surname "Lang." As "Billy Lang" he entered the music business no later than 1910, and his employment probably dates from 1908. He worked first with the Boston firm O’Neil & Story; from 1913–18 he managed the publisher Leo Feist’s Boston office. Thereafter he worked for Broadway Music Corp., becoming its business manager in 1920; he also engaged in several small publishing ventures with friends. He was well-liked in the business; a benefit for him, organised in Boston after a major illness in 1919, raised upwards of $1000. In the 1920s he was still in Boston, but by 1930 he had left the entertainment business and moved to Burlingame, California, where he opened a restaurant. He died in San Francisco.

== Lyricist ==
Billy Lang wrote lyrics for seventeen songs. For all but two of these the composer was May Greene, and he and Greene shared music credits for two other songs with lyrics by others. Only two songs were published by Leo Feist; the rest were issued by small Boston publishers. The six songs written after 1917 were published by his own firms.
