= May Greene =

American composer and vaudeville performer

May Greene (born May 31, ?1890; death date unknown) was the professional name of composer and vaudeville performer Mary O’Donnell.

== Biography ==
May Greene (sometimes spelled “Green”) was born Mary Greenberg to Carlos (sometimes Charles) and Rose Greenberg. Mary's month and day of birth is nearly always recorded as May 31, but the year varies among documents, from 1884 to 1892. The Greenbergs immigrated from Odessa in 1891, joining a growing community of Russian Jews in Boston; Carlos worked first as a pedlar and then established a poultry market downtown. As a child Mary was active at Dorothea Dix House, a settlement school that in 1896 became a home for children of actors. This resulted in her first recorded stage appearance, in 1902, as “little May Green” in a production of Peg Wolfington at the Castle Square Theatre. On March 3, 1907, Mary married Timothy O’Donnell, an actor (born in Wilbraham, Massachusetts on May 30, 1886), in a civil ceremony at Lawrence, Massachusetts. They gave a New York address, although other indications are that Mary continued to be based in Boston, living with her parents, until at least 1914. Thereafter they occupied a series of New York apartments.

At some time in the 1910s most members of the family changed their surname to “Greene.” Mary's brother William enlisted under that name and died in World War I on August 3, 1918; in 1921 a square in Boston was renamed in his honor. In the late 1910s Timothy O’Donnell stopped performing and became a much-respected manager, employed primarily in the Pat Casey agency. The O’Donnells thrice went to Europe, in part to visit William Greene's grave; and in 1922 Mary started a business in imported fabrics, first with co-performer Arthur Astill and later with her sister Hattie (Hannah). The sisters may have been joined by their father, Carlos, still in Boston; in the 1930 census he gave his occupation as “clothing.” Timothy O’Donnell died on January 29, 1932, and was buried in Kensico Cemetery. Mary's subsequent history is unknown.

== Performer ==
After appearances as a child in 1902 and 1903, “Little May Green” reappeared in 1910 in vaudeville, with performances over the next four years noted in Boston, New Hampshire, and New York. In 1914 she traveled to London, apparently for the second time, and opened there on the day war was declared; plans to return in April 1915 had to be abandoned. She played a part in founding the National Vaudeville Artists in 1916 and remained active in the organization. Her career dwindled after 1918; a 1919 review noted that her act “would not do for the better time,” asserted that “her voice is weak,” and summarized rather dismissively, “The act, as a whole, is fair and should be able to play the middle class houses.”

== Composer ==
The evidence that May Greene, the performer, was also May Greene, the composer, is circumstantial but convincing. Greene wrote three piano solos and at least sixteen songs, all but two in collaboration with lyricist Billy Lang and nearly all published in Boston. Greene was a favorite as Lang's “assistant” in the Boston office of Leo Feist; she may, in fact, have served as a song plugger there. Greene and Lang's first publication was in 1908, when both were entering the business, and their last was in 1918, when Greene's performing career started winding down. May Greene (Mary Greenberg) maintained a home in Boston during the years that the two worked together, and when she settled in New York in the late 1910s her song-writing ceased.

Greene's music is conventional but well crafted. Two war songs—“A-M-E-R-I-C-A” (published by D. W. Cooper) and “I am sending criss-cross kisses to some one’s soldier boy” (published by Lang and Mendelsohn)—are noteworthy both because of the possible biographical link to Greene's brother and because she may have performed them herself: “G. J. H.” complained in 1919 that “her patriotic number … is untimely since the war’s end.” As composer and performer Greene is a minor figure; but her path from impoverished immigrant to modest success in popular entertainment, with changing identities and diverse abilities, is typical of rank-and-file show business figures at the time.
