= Dallin =

Dallin is an English surname that is a variant of Dalling or Dawling. Dallin is also a given name.

People with the surname include:

- Alexander Dallin (1924–2000), American historian, political scientist, and professor (son of David Dallin)
- Cyrus Edwin Dallin (1861–1944), American sculptor, painter, and Olympic archer
  - Cyrus Dallin Art Museum, Arlington, Massachusetts
- David Dallin (1889–1962), Belarusian-American Menshevik politician and a writer and lecturer on Soviet affairs
- Leon Dallin, American music theorist
- Lilia Estrin Dallin (a.k.a. Lola Estrin, Paulsen, Lilya Ginzberg; 1898–1981), Russian Trotskyist (second wife of David Dallin)
- Sara Dallin (born 1961), English singer and songwriter

People with the given name include:

- Dallin Applebaum, American songwriter, pianist, vocalist and music producer
- Dallin Holker, American football player
- Dallin Leavitt (born 1994), American football player
- Dallin H. Oaks (born 1932), American religious leader, jurist and academic, 18th President of The Church of Jesus Christ of Latter Day Saints
- Dallin Watene-Zelezniak (born 1995), New Zealand rugby league footballer

== See also ==
- Dallin House, Springville, Utah, US
- Taylor-Dallin House, Arlington, Massachusetts, US
