= Paul Revere's Ride =

1860 poem by Henry Wadsworth Longfellow

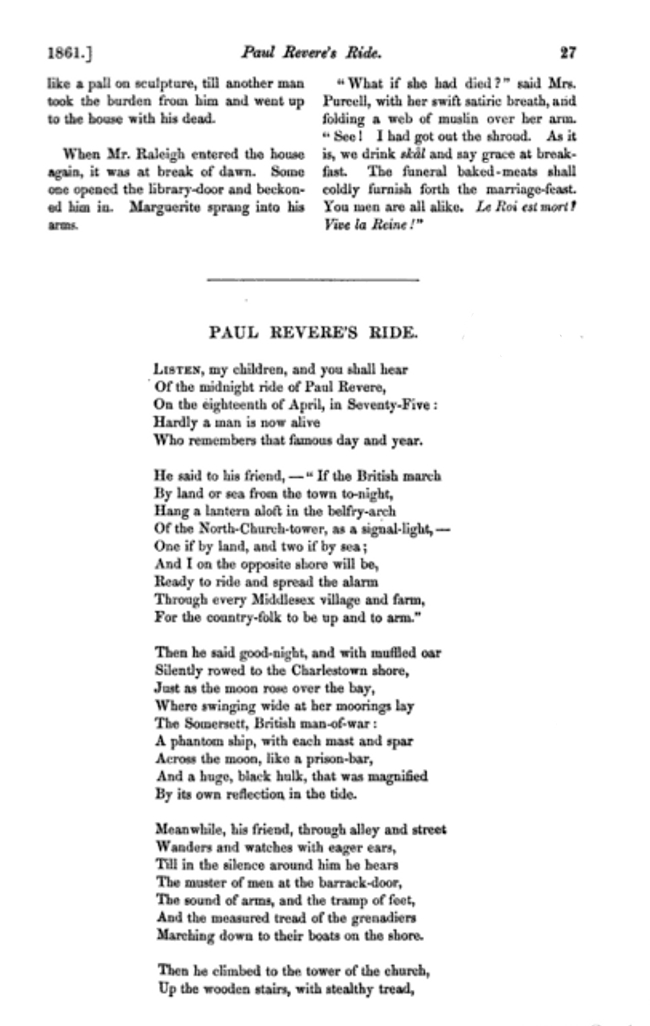
"Paul Revere's Ride" was first published in The Atlantic Monthly in 1861.

"Paul Revere's Ride" is an 1860 poem by American poet Henry Wadsworth Longfellow that commemorates the actions of American patriot Paul Revere on April 18, 1775, although with significant inaccuracies. It was first published in the January 1861 issue of The Atlantic Monthly. It was later retitled "The Landlord's Tale" in Longfellow's 1863 collection Tales of a Wayside Inn.

Longfellow's poem veers from historical facts of Paul Revere's midnight ride. However, the poet set out to write inspirational verses in the growing tensions that would lead to the American Civil War. His poem helped elevate the historical Paul Revere in the public's collective memory of the American Revolution.

== Overview ==
The poem is spoken by the landlord of the Wayside Inn and tells a partially fictionalized story of Paul Revere. In the poem, Revere tells a friend to prepare signal lanterns in the Old North Church to inform him whether British forces will come by land or sea. He would await the signal across the river in Charlestown and be ready to spread the alarm throughout Middlesex County, Massachusetts. The unnamed friend climbs up the steeple and soon sets up two signal lanterns, informing Revere that the British are coming by sea. Revere rides his horse through Medford, Lexington, and Concord to warn the patriots.

== Composition and publication history ==
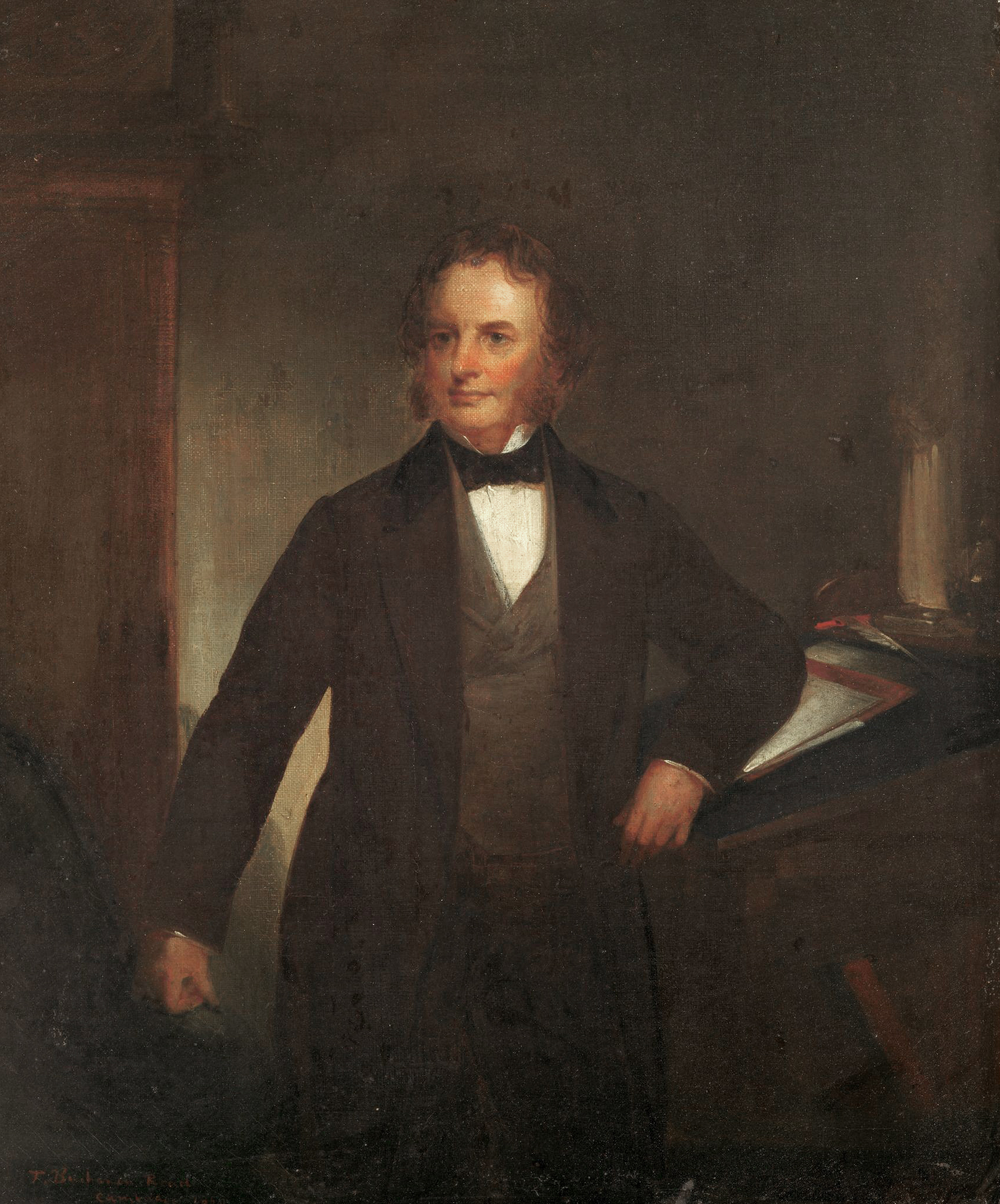
Henry Wadsworth Longfellow in 1860, the year he wrote "Paul Revere's Ride", painted by Thomas Buchanan Read

Longfellow was inspired to write the poem after visiting the Old North Church and climbing its tower on April 5, 1860. He recorded of the excursion: "We go to the Copp's Hill burial-ground and see the tomb of Cotton Mather, his father and his son; then to the old North Church, which looks like a parish church in London. We climb the tower to the chime of bells, now the home of innumerable pigeons. From this tower were hung the lanterns as a signal that the British troops had left Boston for Concord". He began writing the poem the next day. On the anniversary of the historic ride, Longfellow worked on a draft of the poem, which he already titled: "I wrote a few lines in 'Paul Revere's Ride,' this being the day of that achievement".

"Paul Revere's Ride" was published in the January 1861 issue of The Atlantic Monthly magazine. The issue was released on December 20, 1860, just as South Carolina became the first state to secede from the United States. It was later re-published in Longfellow's Tales of a Wayside Inn as "The Landlord's Tale" in 1863. The poem served as the first in a series of 22 narratives bundled as a collection, similar to Geoffrey Chaucer's The Canterbury Tales, and was published in three installments over 10 years. In "The Landlord's Tale" version of the poem, Longfellow changed the 27th line to identify the Old North Church specifically.

Longfellow's family had a connection to the historical Paul Revere. His maternal grandfather, Peleg Wadsworth, was Revere's commander on the Penobscot Expedition.

== Analysis ==
When the poem was written in 1860, the United States was on the verge of Civil War over the issue of slavery. Longfellow first came forward publicly as an abolitionist in 1842 with the publication of his Poems on Slavery. Though he admitted the book made little impact, it was written for his best friend, Charles Sumner, an activist abolitionist politician with whom he would continue to share common cause on the issues of slavery and the Union. Sumner's brother George accompanied Longfellow on the visit to the Old North Church the day before he began writing the poem.

The poem was meant to appeal to Northerners' sense of urgency and, as a call for action, noted that history favors the courageous. Longfellow, who often used poetry to remind readers of cultural and moral values, warns at the end of the poem of a coming "hour of darkness and peril and need", implying the breakup of the Union, and suggests that the "people will waken and listen to hear" the midnight message again. By emphasizing common history, he was attempting to dissolve social tensions.

The phrase "Hardly a man is now alive" was true as one of the last men alive at the time of the historical event had only recently died. Jonathan Harrington, the young fifer for Lexington's militia during the battles of Lexington and Concord, died at the age of 96 in 1854, a few years before the poem was written. It is unknown if Longfellow would have known this information.

The poem fluctuates between past and present tense, sometimes in the same sentence, symbolically pulling the actions of the Revolution into modern times and displaying an event with timeless sympathies. Some have identified the cadence of the poem as emulating the sound of a galloping horse.

Longfellow's poem is not historically accurate but his alterations were deliberate. He had researched the historical event, using works like George Bancroft's History of the United States, but he manipulated the facts for poetic effect. One of his early poems was a sonnet published in an 1832 issue of New England Magazine next to a reprint of Revere's firsthand account of the historic event. 17 years after "Paul Revere's Ride", Longfellow referred a reader to that article as a more accurate account. In his poem, Longfellow was purposefully trying to create an American legend, much as he did with works like The Song of Hiawatha (1855) and The Courtship of Miles Standish (1858).

== Critical response ==
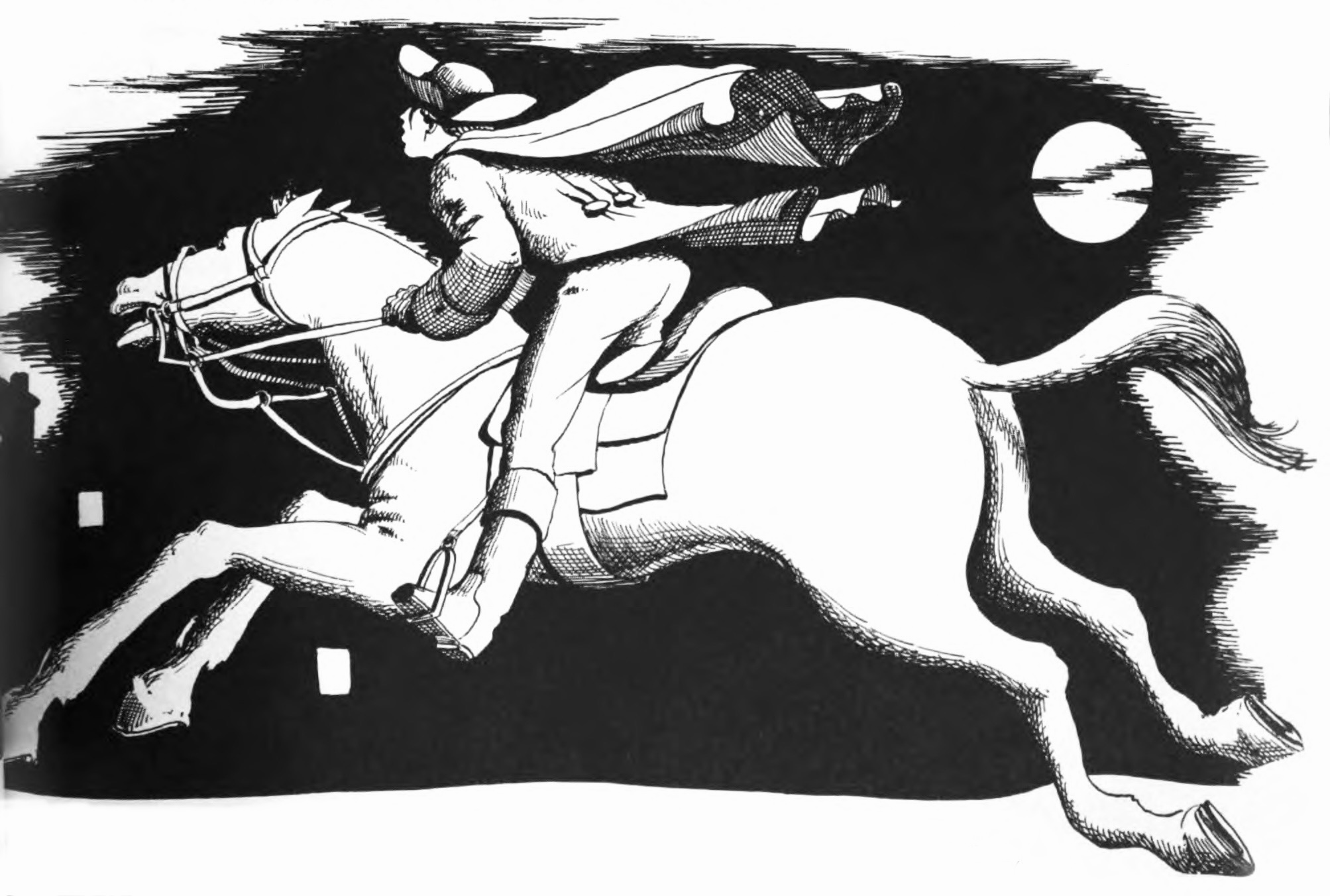
An illustration by Leonard Everett Fisher of the midnight ride of Paul Revere (1957)

"Paul Revere's Ride", which was published at the height of Longfellow's popularity, became a well-known poem. Later in his life, Longfellow sometimes received Revere-related gifts from admirers, including a silver spoon in 1871 that had been made by Revere. Longfellow recorded, "When I received it, I felt as if I had been christened over again and had an 'apostle spoon' sent me as a present. Paul Revere was an apostle of liberty, if not of religion".

=== Modern ===
Modern critics of the poem emphasize not the poem's overall quality of writing, but its many historical inaccuracies. For example, the poem depicts the lantern signal in the Old North Church as meant for Revere, but actually the signal was from Revere: the historical Paul Revere did not receive the lantern signal, but actually was the one who ordered it to be set up. The poem depicts Revere rowing himself across the Charles River when, in reality, he was rowed over by others. He also did not reach Concord that night. Another inaccuracy is a general lengthening of the time frame of the night's events.

The majority of criticism notes that Longfellow gave sole credit to Revere for the collective achievements of several riders, including those whose names do not survive in history. Revere and William Dawes rode, via different routes, from Boston to Lexington, where they were joined by Samuel Prescott. They warned Patriots that British troops were marching towards Lexington and Concord, and many of the people they spoke to then passed the message to others. Of the three main riders, only Prescott arrived at Concord in time to warn the militia there.

== Historical impact ==
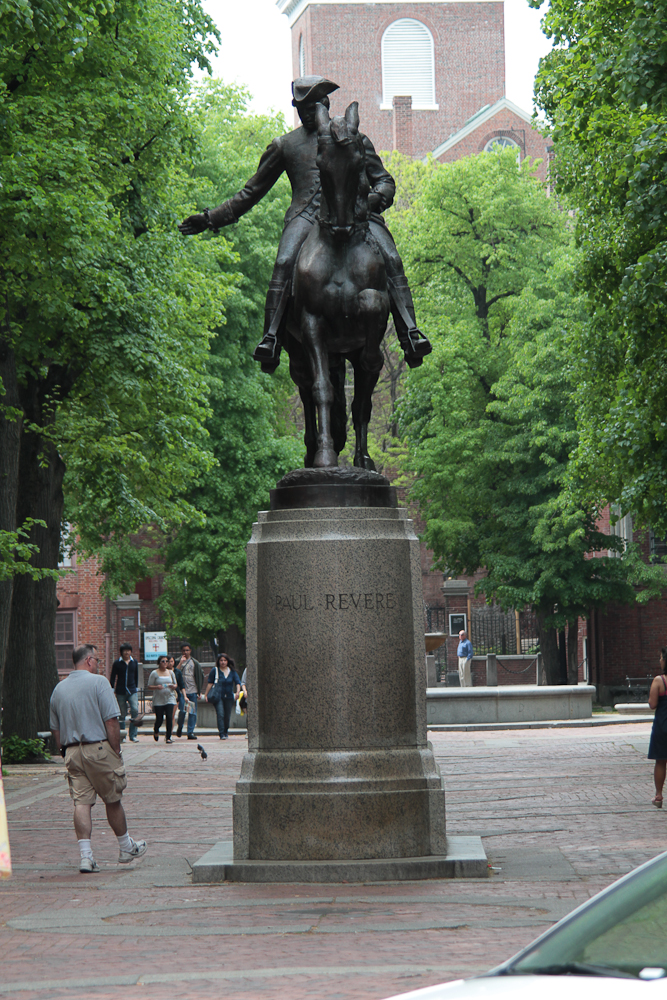
Paul Revere (1940) by Cyrus Edwin Dallin, North End, Boston, Massachusetts. The Old North Church is visible in the background.

Longfellow's poem is credited with creating the national legend of Paul Revere, a previously little-known Massachusetts silversmith. Upon Revere's death in 1818, for example, his obituary did not mention his midnight ride but instead focused on his business sense and his many friends. The fame that Longfellow brought to Revere materialized after the Civil War amidst the Colonial Revival Movement of the 1870s.

In 1875, for example, the Old North Church mentioned in the poem began an annual custom called the "lantern ceremony" recreating the action of the poem. Longfellow's daughters witnessed that event, as he wrote: "In the evening my girls drive over to Prospect Hill to see the lighting of Paul Revere's lanterns in the belfry of the old North Church". In 1878, the Church added a plaque noting it as the site of "the signal lanterns of Paul Revere".

Revere's elevated historical importance also led to unsubstantiated rumors that he made a set of false teeth for George Washington. Revere's legendary status continued for decades and, in part due to Longfellow's poem, authentic silverware made by Revere commanded high prices. Wall Street tycoon J. P. Morgan, for example, offered $100,000 for a punch bowl Revere made.

In 1883, Boston held a national competition for an equestrian statue of Paul Revere. The winner was Cyrus Edwin Dallin, whose model was accepted in 1899, though the statue itself was not dedicated until 1940. It stands in Paul Revere Mall, opposite the Old North Church.

In 1896 Helen F. Moore, dismayed that William Dawes had been forgotten, penned a parody of Longfellow's poem, excerpted here:

'Tis all very well for the children to hear
Of the midnight ride of Paul Revere;
But why should my name be quite forgot,
Who rode as boldly and well, God wot?
Why should I ask? The reason is clear—
My name was Dawes and his Revere.

In 2007, the United States Postal Service (USPS) issued a commemorative stamp with images referencing the poem. Longfellow is represented by a painting by artist Kazuhiko Sano.

In 2026, Elizabeth Nichols released a song, "Paul Revere", with quotes from and references to Longfellow's original poem, including the first few lines spoken at the start.
