= Dalcin =

Dalcin is a surname. Notable people with the surname include:

- Pierre-Emmanuel Dalcin (born 1977), French Alpine skier
- Reinaldo Dalcin, Brazilian model and mechanical engineer

== See also ==
- Dallin
