= Dalling =

Dalling may refer to:

== People ==
- Bruce Dalling (1938–2008), South African yachtsman
- Henry Bulwer, 1st Baron Dalling and Bulwer (1801–1872), British politician, diplomat and writer
- Sir John Dalling, 1st Baronet (c.1731–1798), British soldier and colonial administrator
- Dalling baronets, a title in the Baronetage of Great Britain

== Places ==
- Field Dalling, a village in Norfolk, England
- Wood Dalling, a village in Norfolk, England
- Dalling Monastery, a Buddhist monastery in Sikkim, India
