= Leon Dallin =

American music theorist

Glen Leon Dallin Jr. (March 26, 1918 Silver City, Utah – December 31, 1993) was an American music theorist whose primary work was Techniques of Twentieth Century Composition: A Guide to the Materials of Modern Music.

Dallin was born in Utah. He received his bachelor's and master's degrees in music from Eastman School of Music and a Ph.D. from The University of California, Berkeley. He then was a professor at Brigham Young University from 1948 to 1955 and at California State University, Long Beach from 1955 to 1983.

== Sources ==
- Leon Dallin Collection at Sibley Music Library, Eastman School of Music
