= Equestrian statue of Paul Revere =

Equestrian statue in Boston, Massachusetts, U.S.

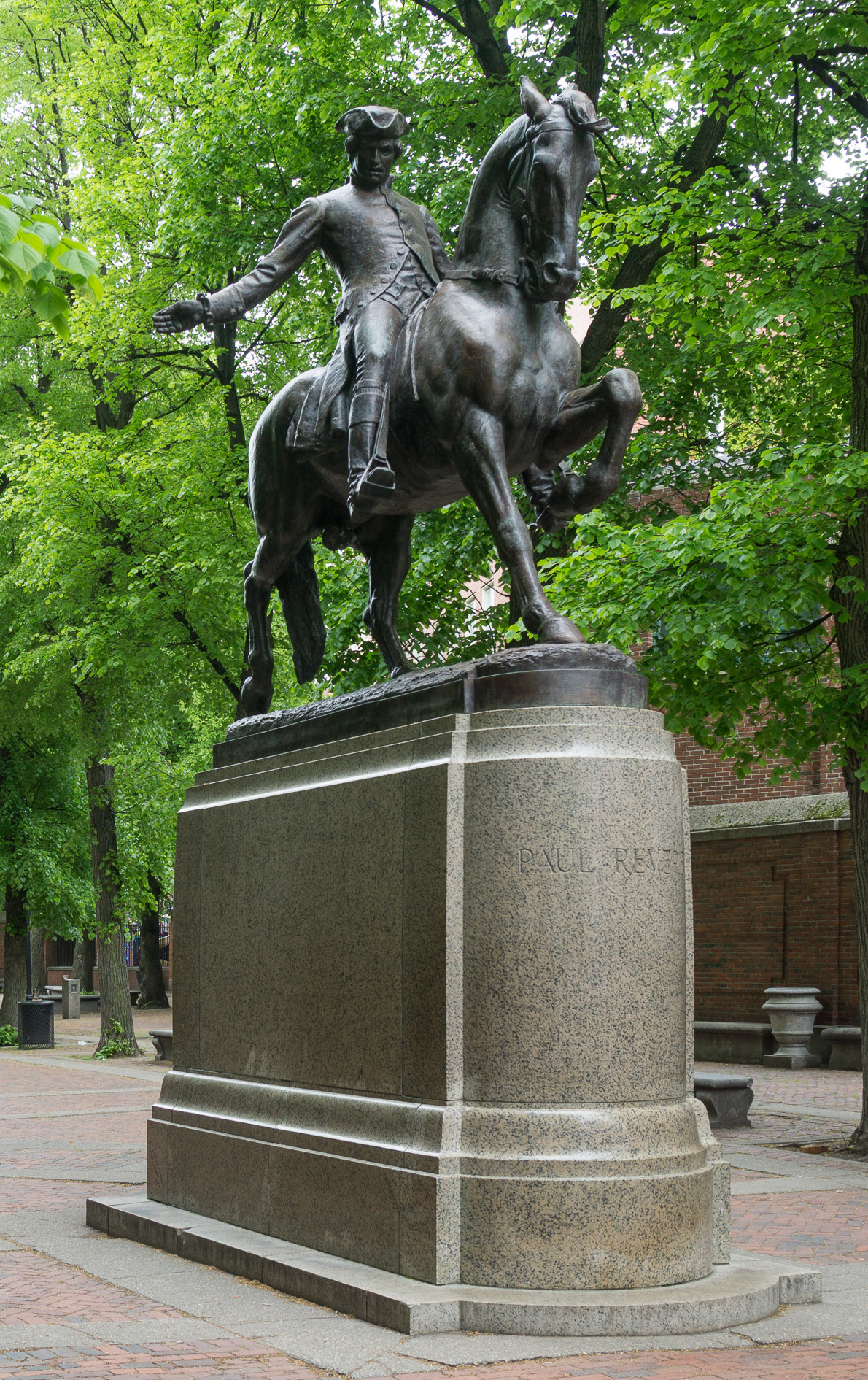
- The statue in 2017
- Artists: Statue: Cyrus Edwin Dallin; Base: Y. Lovell Little; Raymond A. Porter
- Year: 1885 (modeled); 1940 (cast)
- Medium: Statue: Bronze; Base: Granite
- Subject: Paul Revere
- Location: Boston, Massachusetts, U.S.; 42°21′56.1″N 71°3′11.7″W

An equestrian statue of Paul Revere by Cyrus Edwin Dallin is installed at Paul Revere Mall near the Old North Church in Boston, Massachusetts.

== Description and history ==
The sculpture was modeled in 1885, cast in bronze in 1940, and dedicated on September 22 of that year. The statue rests on a Milford pink granite base designed by Y. Lovell Little and Raymond A. Porter.

Twenty-three-year-old Cyrus Dallin won a competition for the sculpture in 1885, beating out two other finalists: Daniel Chester French and James E. Kelly of New York. Other famous sculptors competed, including Thomas Ball. The day following the award, French visited Dallin and congratulated him. Boston Mayor Hugh O'Brien's signed contract confirmed the award.

Due to a variety of circumstances, the project was delayed for over 50 years. At the age of 79, Dallin finally saw his project move forward. The George Robert White Fund Trustees accepted Dallin's model for casting and appropriated $27,500 for its execution in bronze. It was cast at the T. F. McGann Foundry in Somerville.

At the 1940 dedication event, James F. O’Connell, manager of the White Fund, presented the statue to the Mayor of Boston, Maurice J. Tobin. The Mayor then introduced Henry L. Shattuck of the Boston City Council to give the dedication address that was heard by thousands. Also in attendance was Raymond J. Kelly, who was National Commander of the American legion.

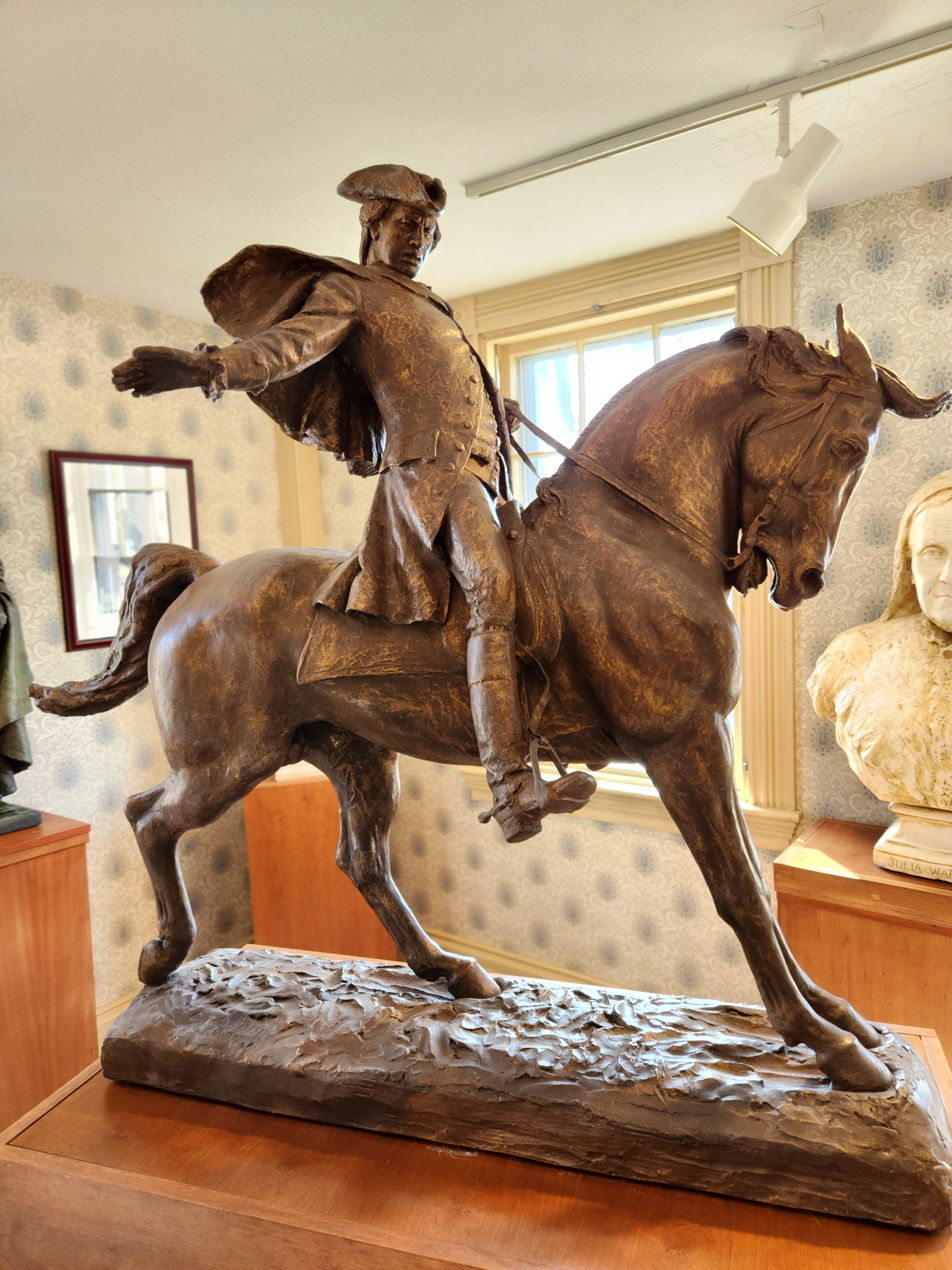
Paul Revere Statue Model Number 6 at the Cyrus Dallin Art Museum

In the decades that the statue was stalled, Dallin executed several versions of the sculpture. Version number 6 is on display in the Cyrus Dallin Art Museum. In 2024, the Museum installed a version of number 5 on a pedestal on the grounds.

The artwork was surveyed by the Smithsonian Institution's "Save Outdoor Sculpture!" program in 1993.

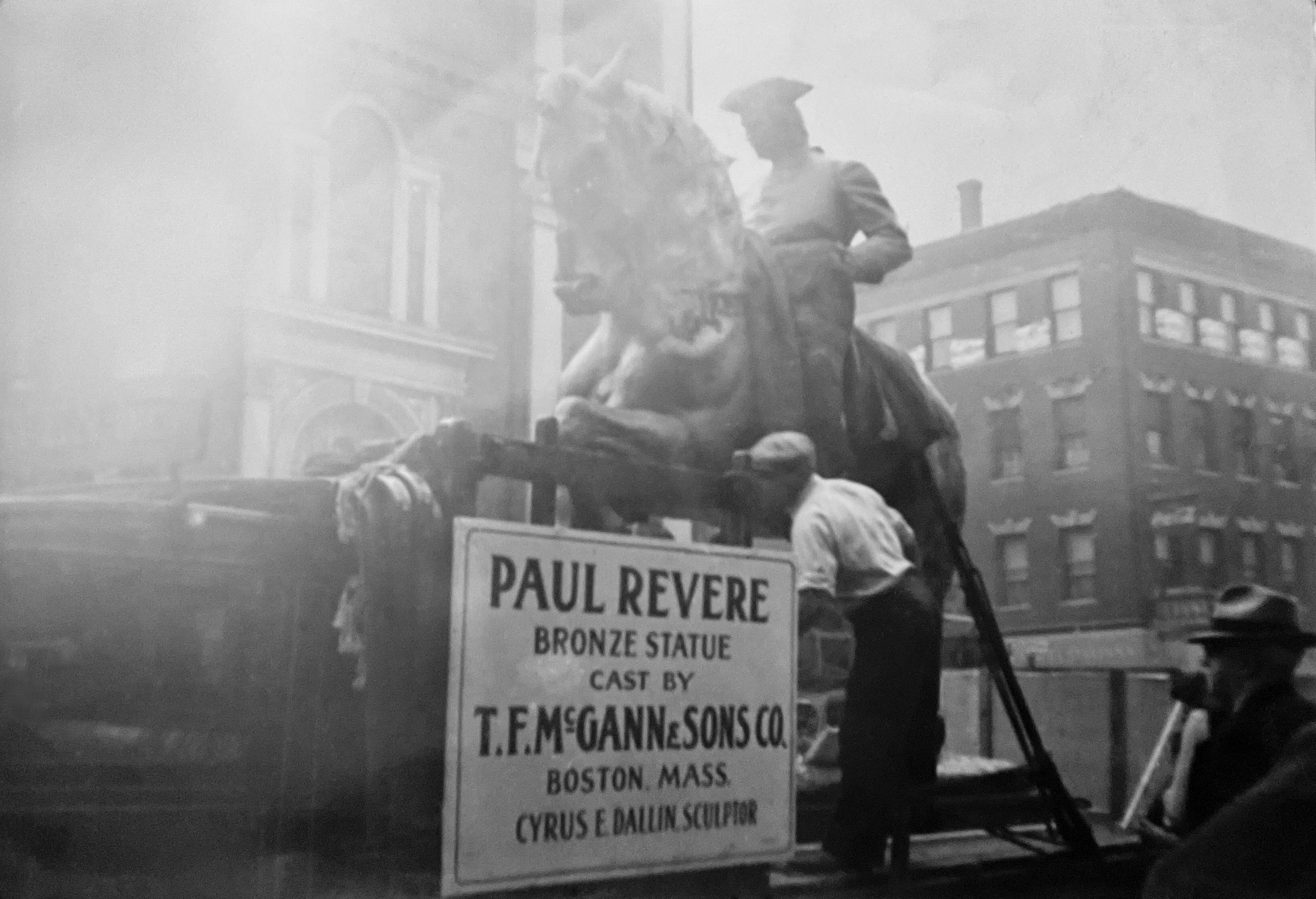
Delivery of the statue for dedication

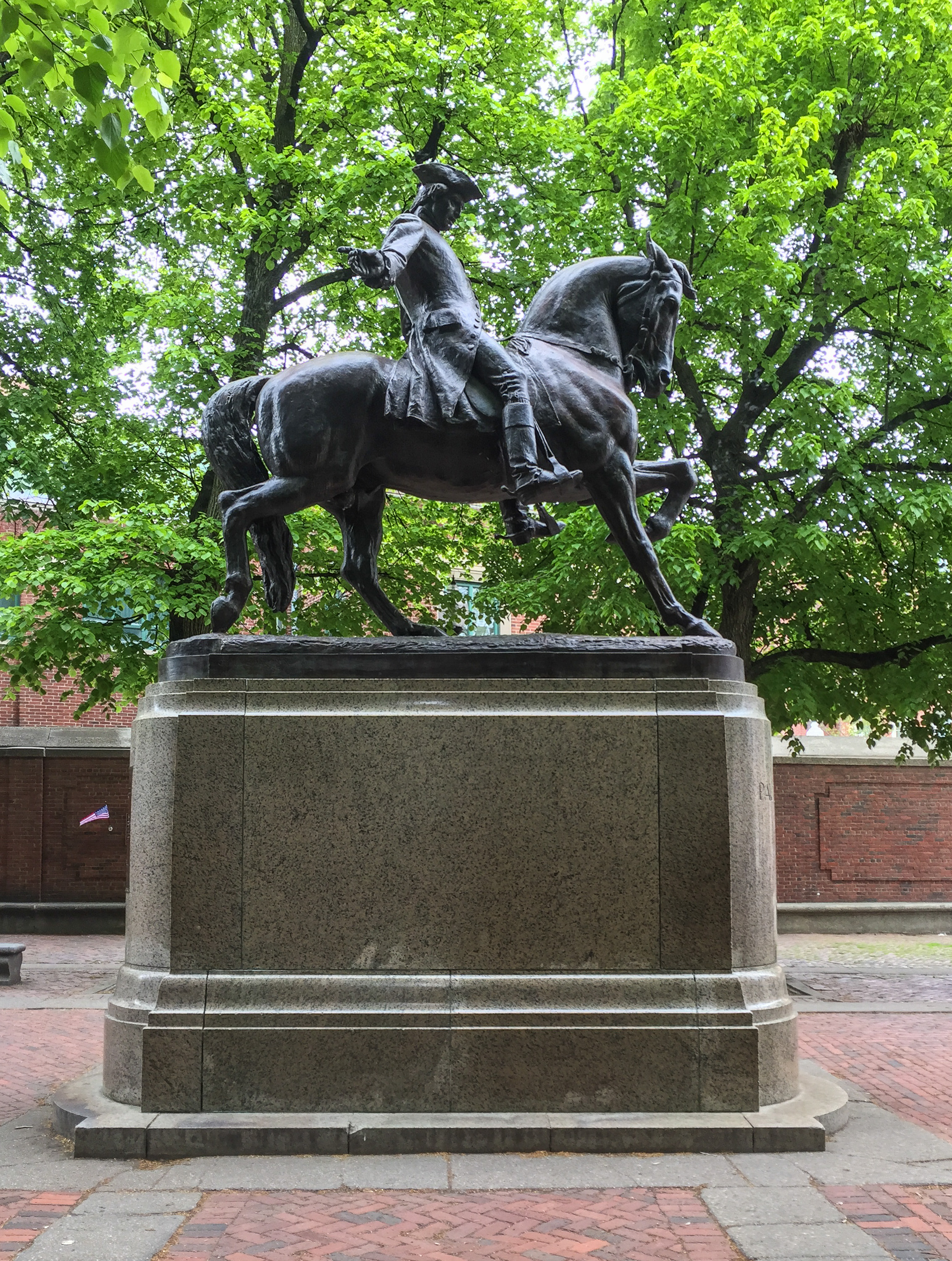
Profile of the statue

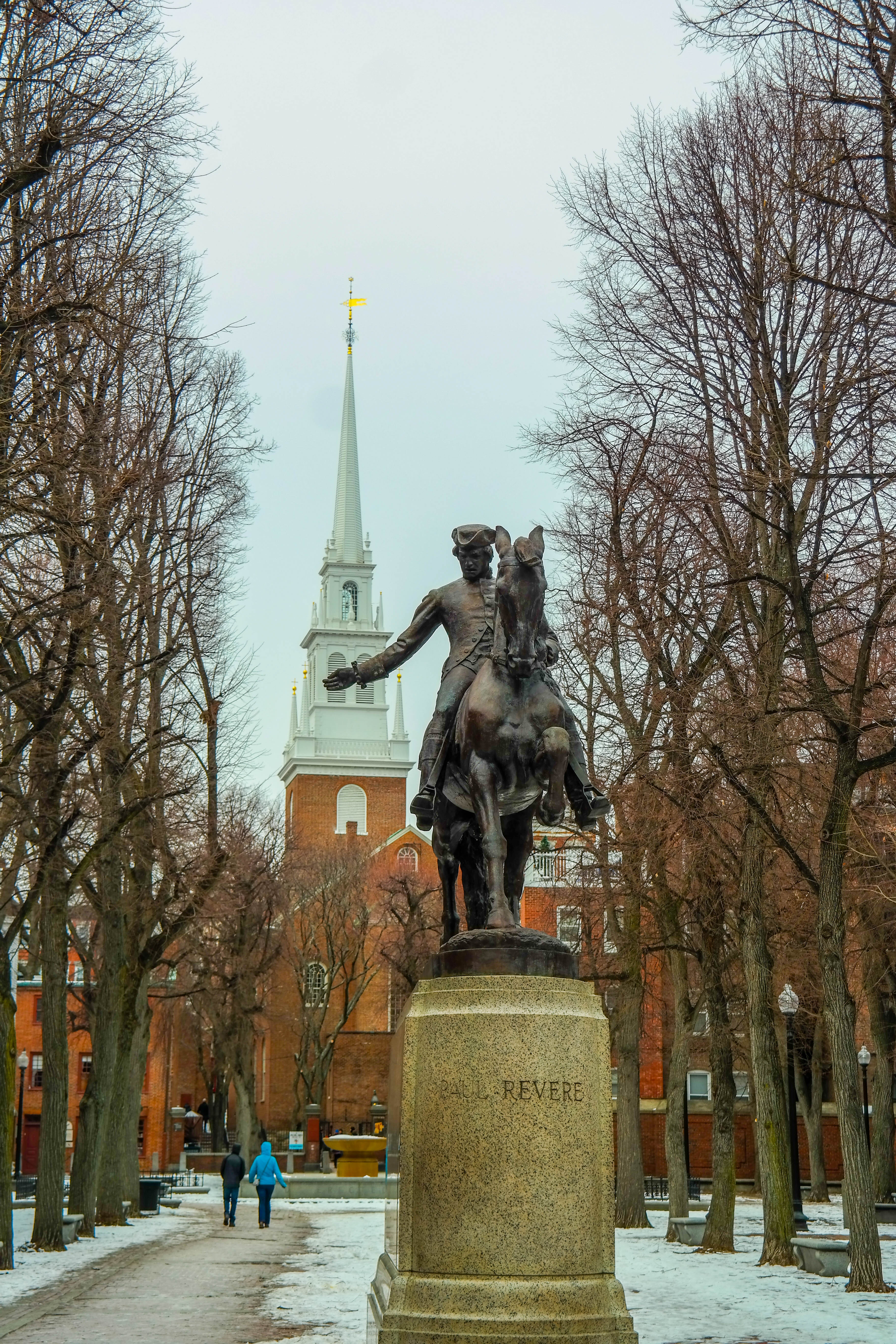
Statue with the Old North Church visible in the background

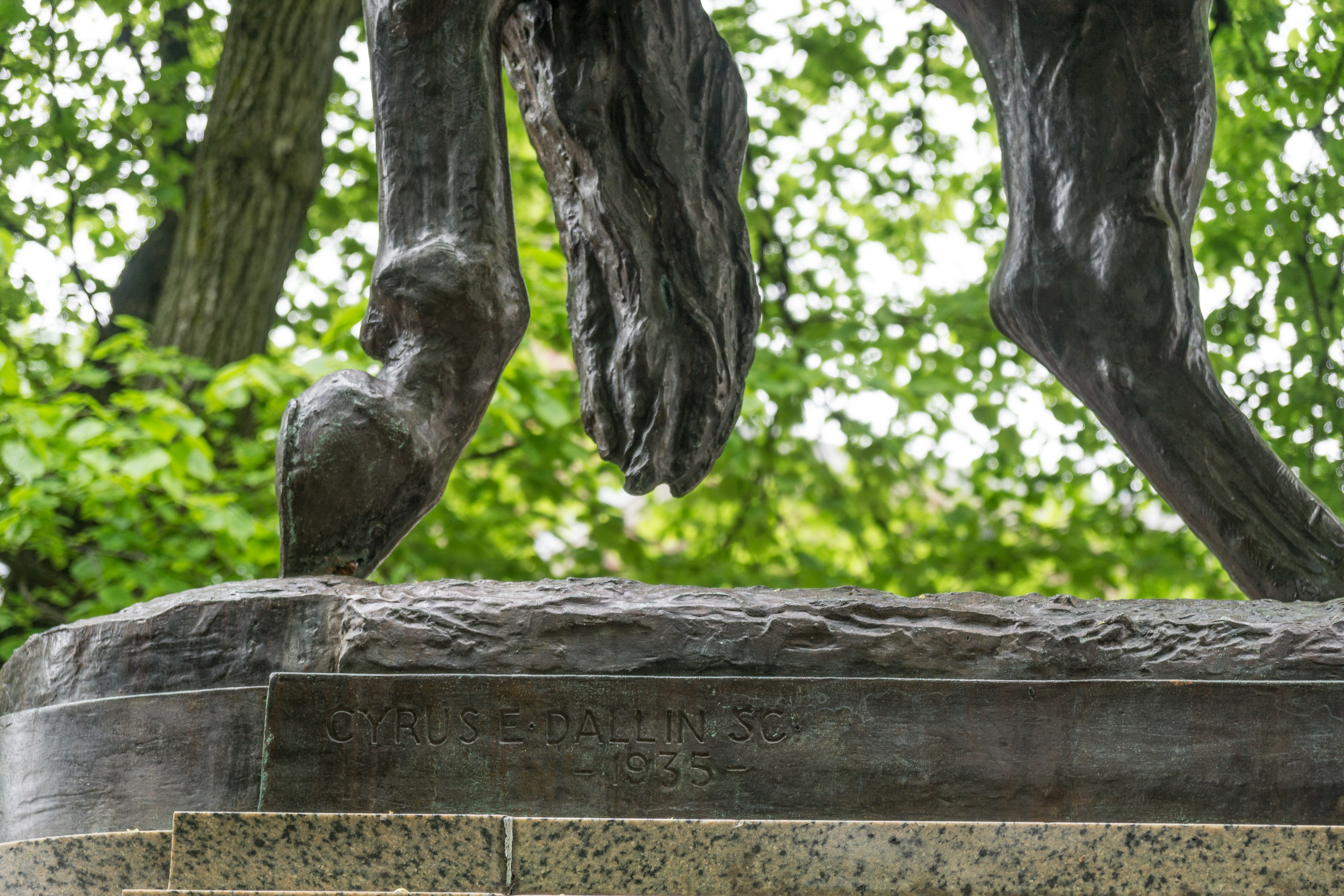
Detail showing Dallin's signature

== See also ==
- List of sculptures by Cyrus Dallin in Massachusetts
