= Cyrus Dallin Art Museum =

Art museum in Arlington, Massachusetts

- Cyrus Dallin Art Museum in the Jefferson Cutter House
- U.S. National Register of Historic Places
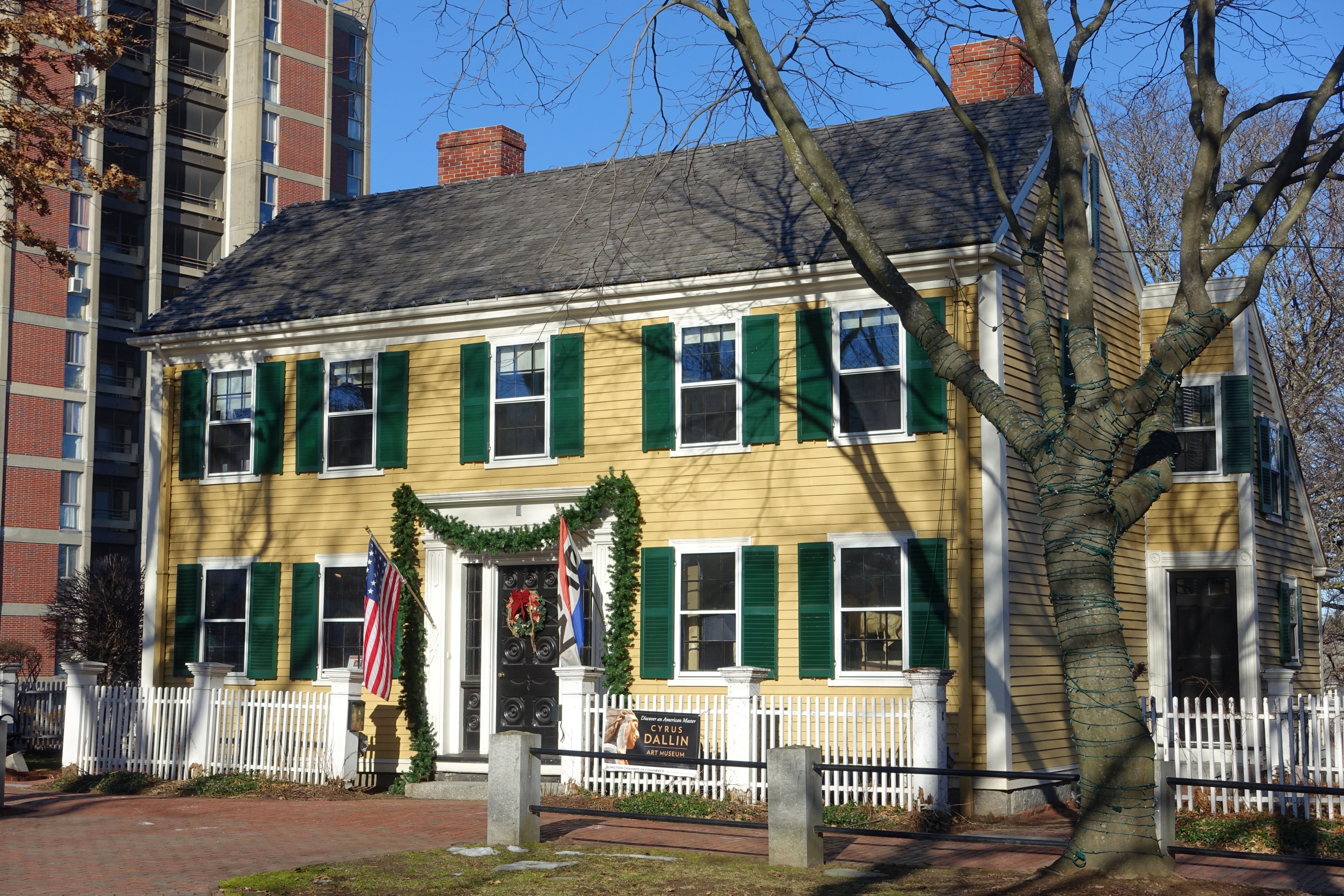
- Jefferson Cutter House in 2019

- Location within Massachusetts Location within the United States
- Location: 611 Massachusetts Avenue, Arlington, Massachusetts
- Coordinates: 42°24′55″N 71°9′12″W
- Built: 1830
- Architectural style: Greek Revival, Federal
- MPS: Arlington MRA
- NRHP reference No.: 85001028
- Added to NRHP: January 23, 1992

The Cyrus Dallin Art Museum (CDAM) in Arlington, Massachusetts, United States is dedicated to displaying the artworks and documentation of American sculptor, educator, and Indigenous rights activist Cyrus Dallin, who lived and worked in the town for over 40 years. He is well known for his sculptural works around the US including The Scout in Kansas City, Missouri, The Soldiers' and Sailors' Monument in Syracuse, New York and The Signal of Peace in Chicago. Locally, he is best known for his iconic Appeal to the Great Spirit and Paul Revere Monument statues, both located in Boston.

== Museum ==
The Cyrus Dallin Art Museum is the only institution in the United States solely dedicated to preserving and interpreting the work of this late 19th to early 20th-century sculptor, and it exhibits over 90 artworks spanning Cyrus Dallin's 60-year career. These include portrayals of Indigenous peoples and Anglo-European historical figures; portraits of family members and friends; casts and prototypes of public monuments and memorials; and coins, medals, and paintings. The museum's comprehensive exhibits ground Dallin's body of work within the context of his commitment to artistic expression, education, and Indigenous rights.

== Building ==
The Cyrus Dallin Art Museum is located in the Jefferson Cutter House, a historic house on the National Register of Historic Places located in the center of Arlington, Massachusetts. The building is owned by the town, and also serves as the location of the Arlington Chamber of Commerce and the Cutter Gallery, an organization that exhibits the work of local artists.

Built in 1830 in a Greek Revival/Federal style in a saltbox shape, it originally was home to Jefferson Cutter, who was born in Arlington (then part of West Cambridge) in 1803. The elaborately carved main entry door is likely the work of Cutter himself, who was a turner and millwright. The house was added to the National Register of Historic Places in 1992.

== History ==
=== Cyrus E. Dallin (1861–1944) ===
Cyrus Edwin Dallin
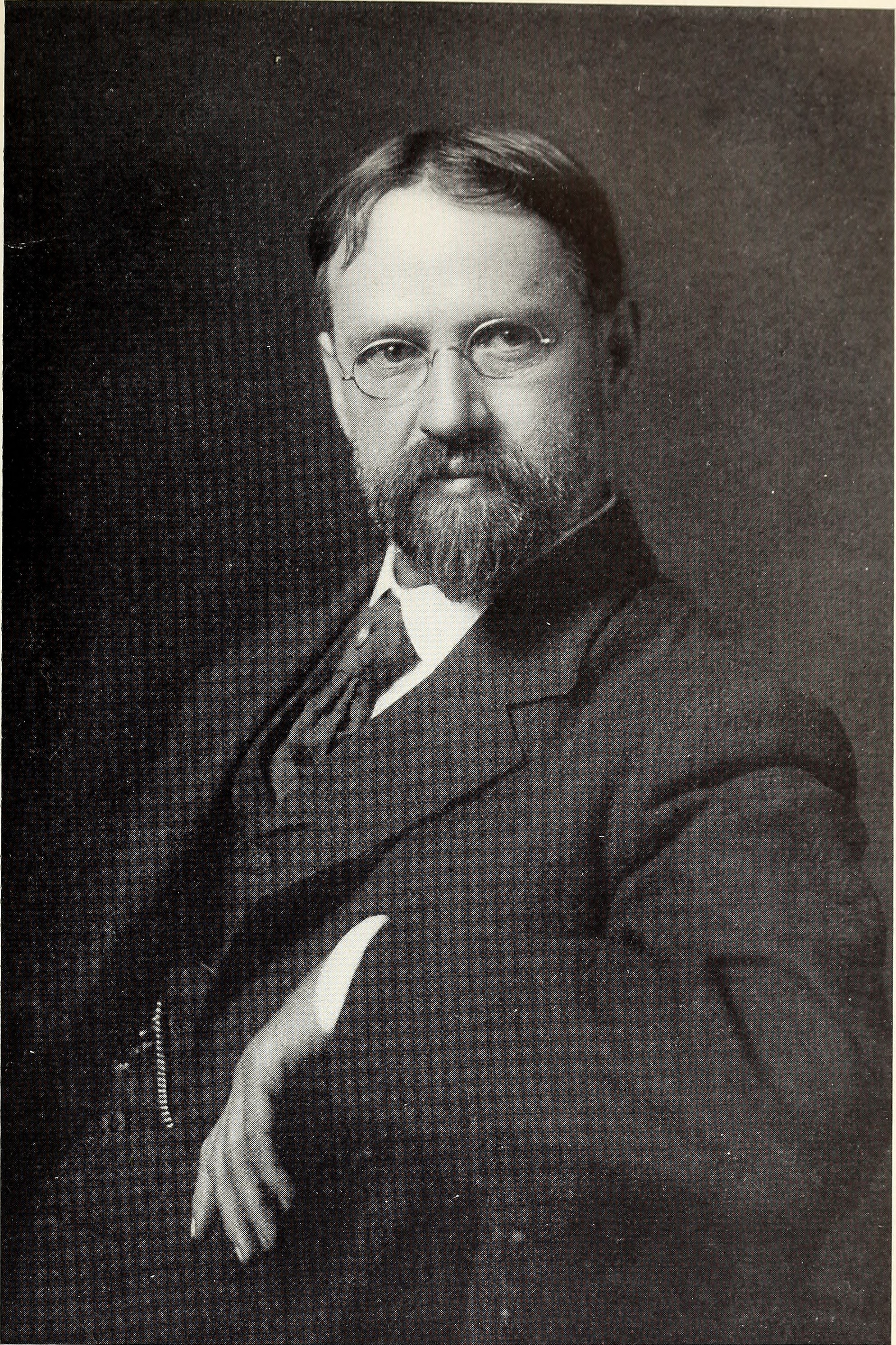
- Dallin c. 1912
- Notable work: Appeal to the Great Spirit (1908); Paul Revere Monument (1885–1940); Angel Moroni (1893)

Cyrus Edwin Dallin was born on November 22, 1861, in Springville, Utah. His sculpting and artistic talent was recognized at an early age, and he was sent to Boston at 19 to study with T.H. Bartlett. Today he is regarded as one of the most important sculptors in American art.

Dallin found the road to success difficult, but his perseverance and dedication are revealed in his efforts to complete whatever he started. A testament to Dallin's tenacity is his 58-year campaign to get an equestrian statue of Paul Revere funded and fabricated. After a series of 7 versions over the years, Dallin's statue was erected in 1940 in Boston's historic North End.

In 1891, Dallin married the writer Vittoria Colonna Murray; the couple raised three sons. During this time, Dallin actively pursued commissions, exhibited, and won many prizes. Stable income to support his family came from teaching appointments, chiefly at the Massachusetts Normal Art School (now Massachusetts College of Art and Design), from 1900 to 1941.

Dallin gained the respect of other artists of his day, including Augustus St. Gaudens and John Singer Sargent, who became a close friend. (Sargent's sketch of Dallin's Portico is a treasured item in the museum's collection.) Dallin's art was reproduced and collected on a broad scale. Among his most beloved works are his monuments of Native Americans, which changed the face of public art in America.

In 1900, at the age of 39, Dallin moved to Arlington, Massachusetts, where he lived and worked for the rest of his life. As a result, Arlington is now the home for many of his works. Dallin died at his own home on November 14, 1944, a week short of his 83rd birthday.

=== Museum ===
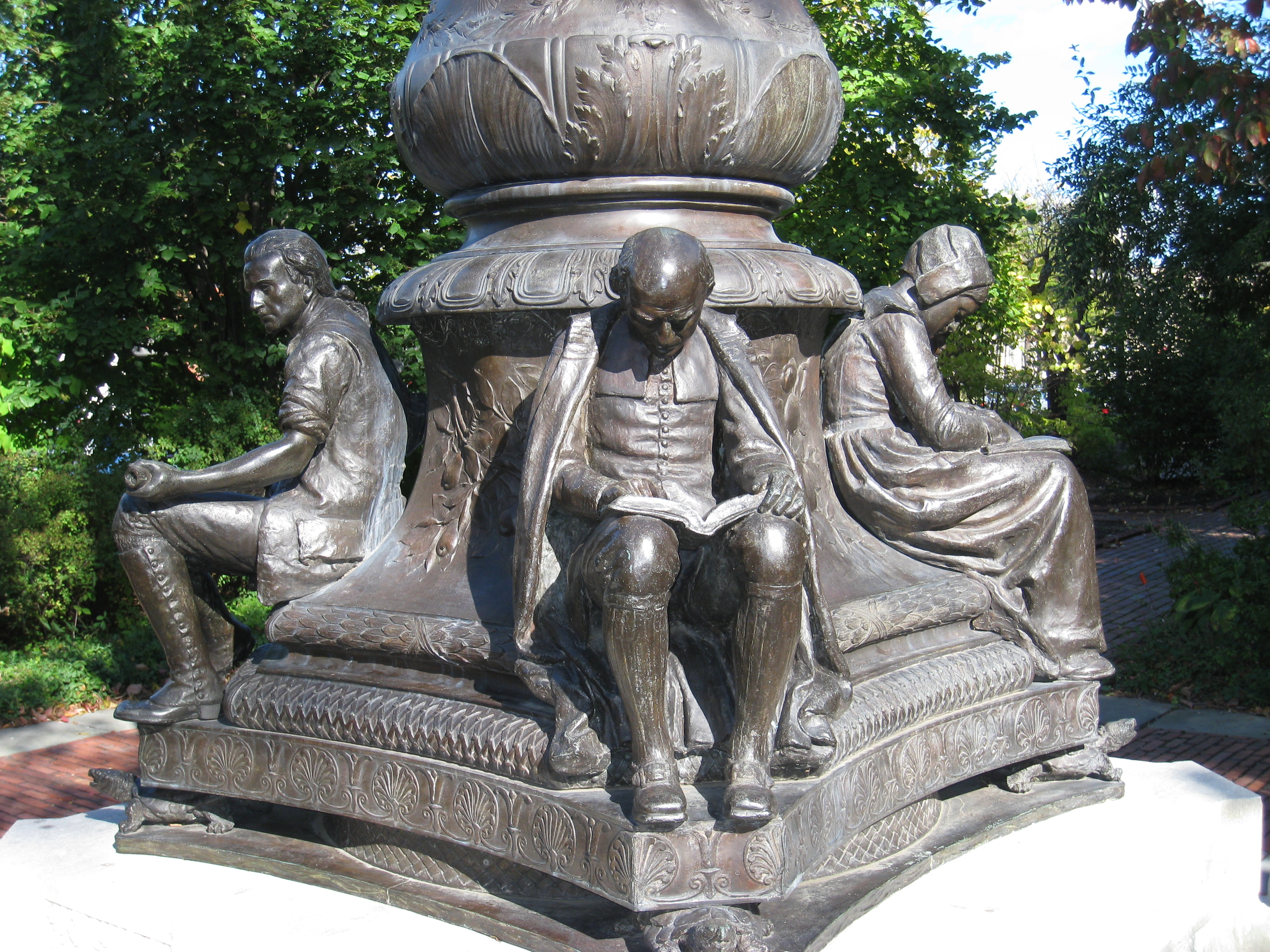
Robbins Memorial Flagstaff with sculptures by Dallin (located near the Cyrus Dallin Art Museum)

The museum is a joint venture of the Cyrus E. Dallin Art Museum, Inc. (an independent nonprofit organization) and the Town of Arlington. In 1982, the Arlington Arts Council received a $720 grant from State Lottery funds, which were applied to a historic marker for the Robbins Memorial Flagstaff that includes five sculptures by Cyrus Dallin.

In 1984, growing awareness of Dallin fostered the formation of a committee to survey the town buildings to find and catalog Dallin's works throughout Arlington. This project led to the discovery of 24 works, many of which needed care. In 1985, following the recommendation of the committee, the Arlington Town Meeting established the Cyrus Dallin Art Museum. The stated mission of the museum was to collect, preserve, and exhibit the work of Cyrus Dallin. The following year, the Board of Selectmen appointed a volunteer board of trustees to operate the museum. A fundraising effort begun in 1988 raised $35,000 toward a restoration program.

The collection did not have a home until 1998, when the town acquired the historic Jefferson Cutter House and made the property available for use as the Cyrus Dallin Art Museum. In October 1998, founders James McGough, Geri Tremblay, David Formanex, Richard Bowler, Ann Bowler, and others celebrated the opening of the museum's first two exhibition galleries in the Jefferson Cutter house. In 2000, the nonprofit Cyrus E. Dallin Art Museum Inc. was established to serve as the fundraising and fiduciary arm of the museum. Two additional galleries were added, in 2001 and 2004.

== Permanent collection ==
The Cyrus Dallin Museum hosts over 90 works by Cyrus Dallin including plaster and bronze sculptures, reliefs, medals, and paintings. The museum also provides a self-guided walking tour to other local sculptures, including Dallin works located nearby.

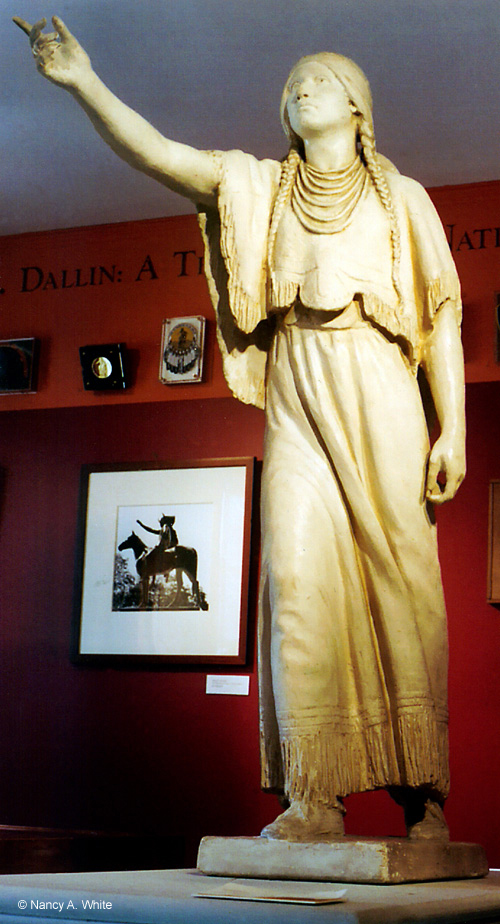
Sacajawea

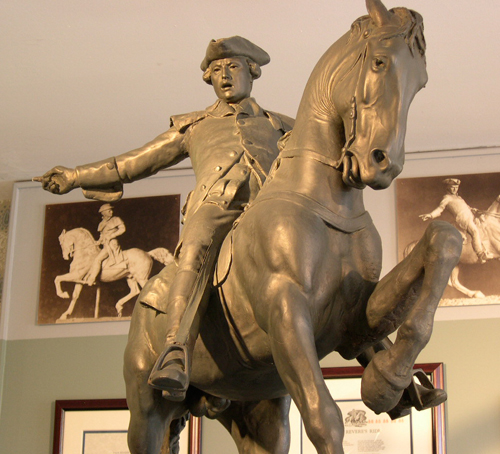
Paul Revere

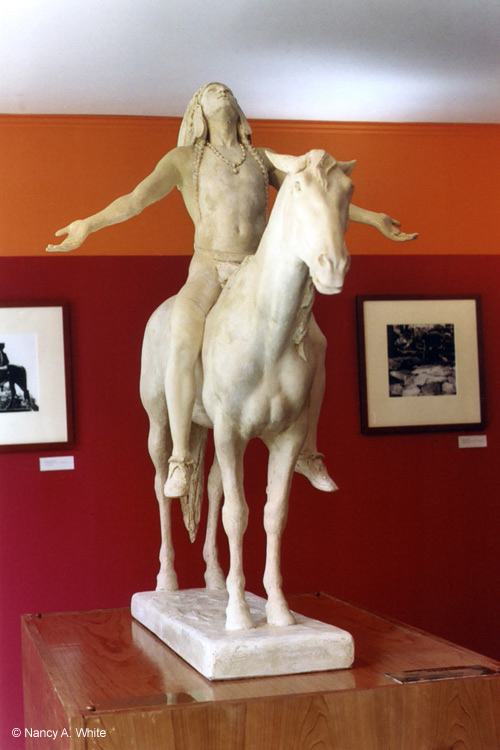
Appeal to the Great Spirit

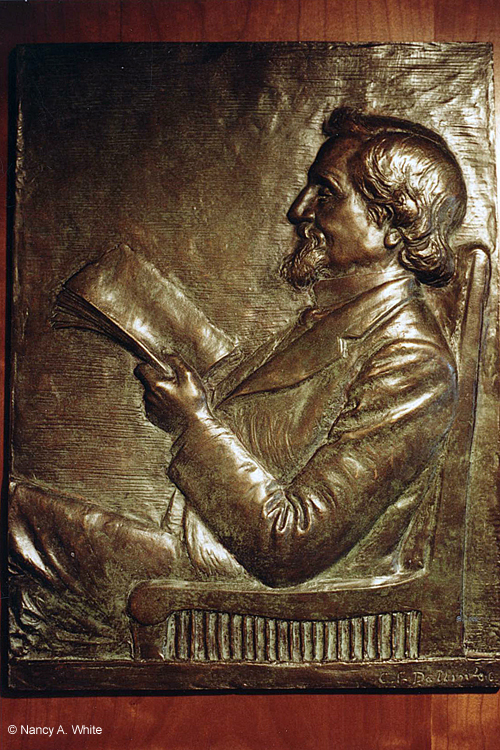
John Trowbridge

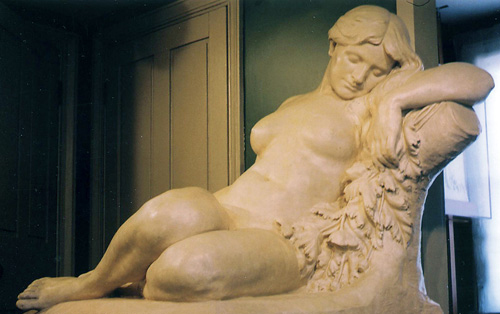
Lethe

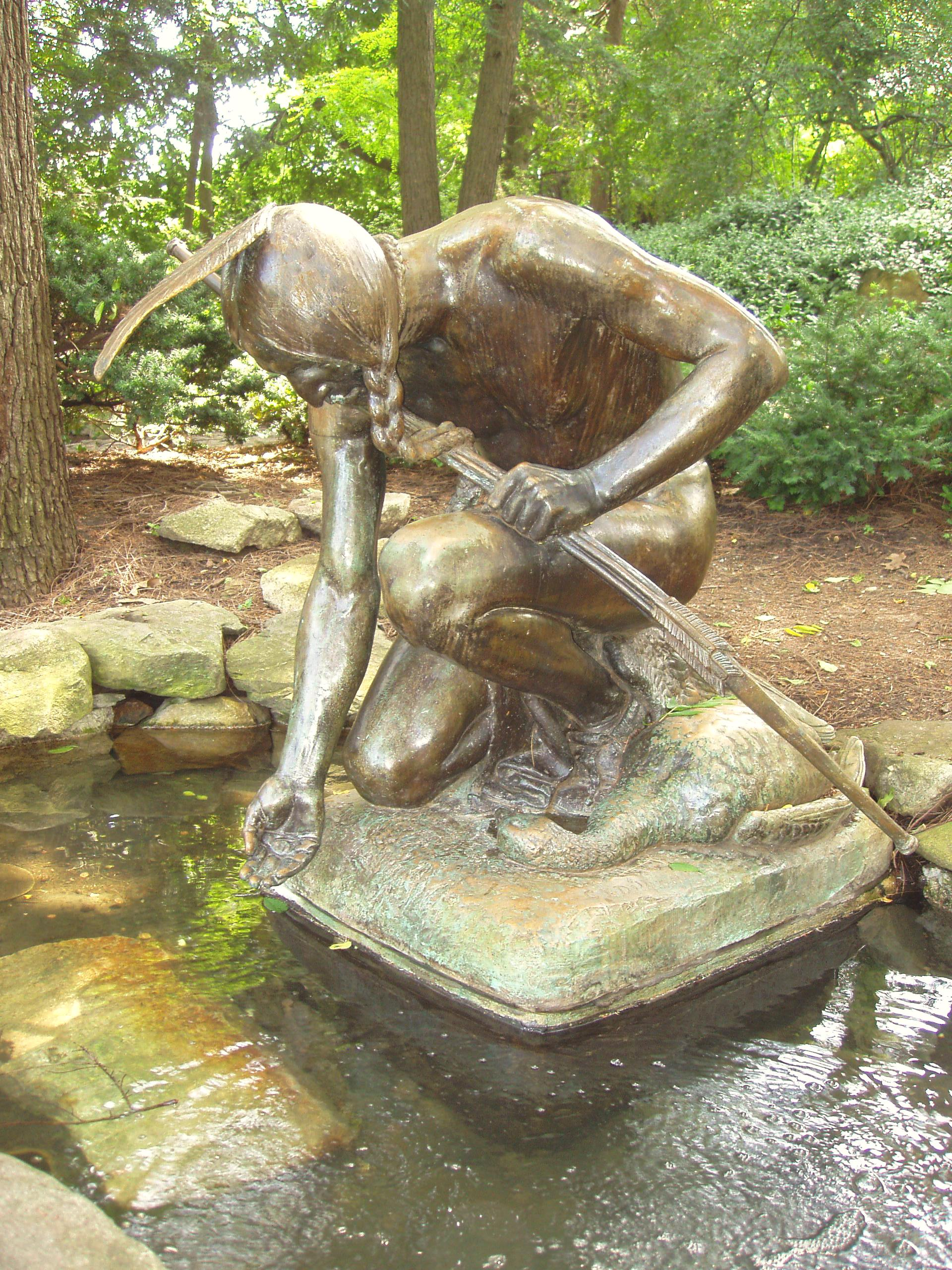
Menotomy Hunter (in nearby Robbins Park)

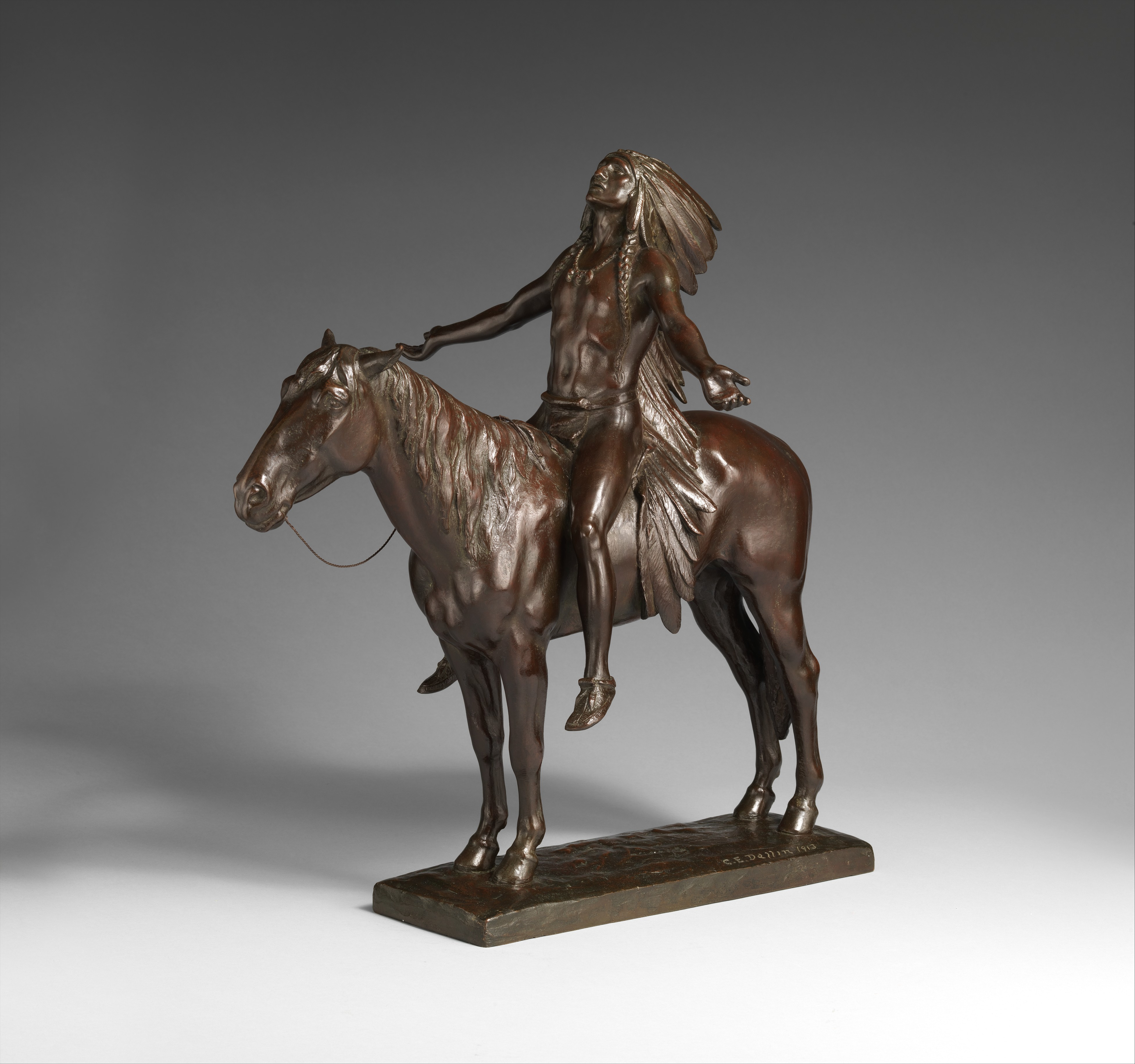
Appeal to the Great Spirit

== See also ==
- Dallin House (birthplace)
- List of sculptures by Cyrus Dallin in Massachusetts
- List of single-artist museums
- Taylor-Dallin House
