= Dallin House =

Historic house in Utah, United States

- U.S. National Register of Historic Places
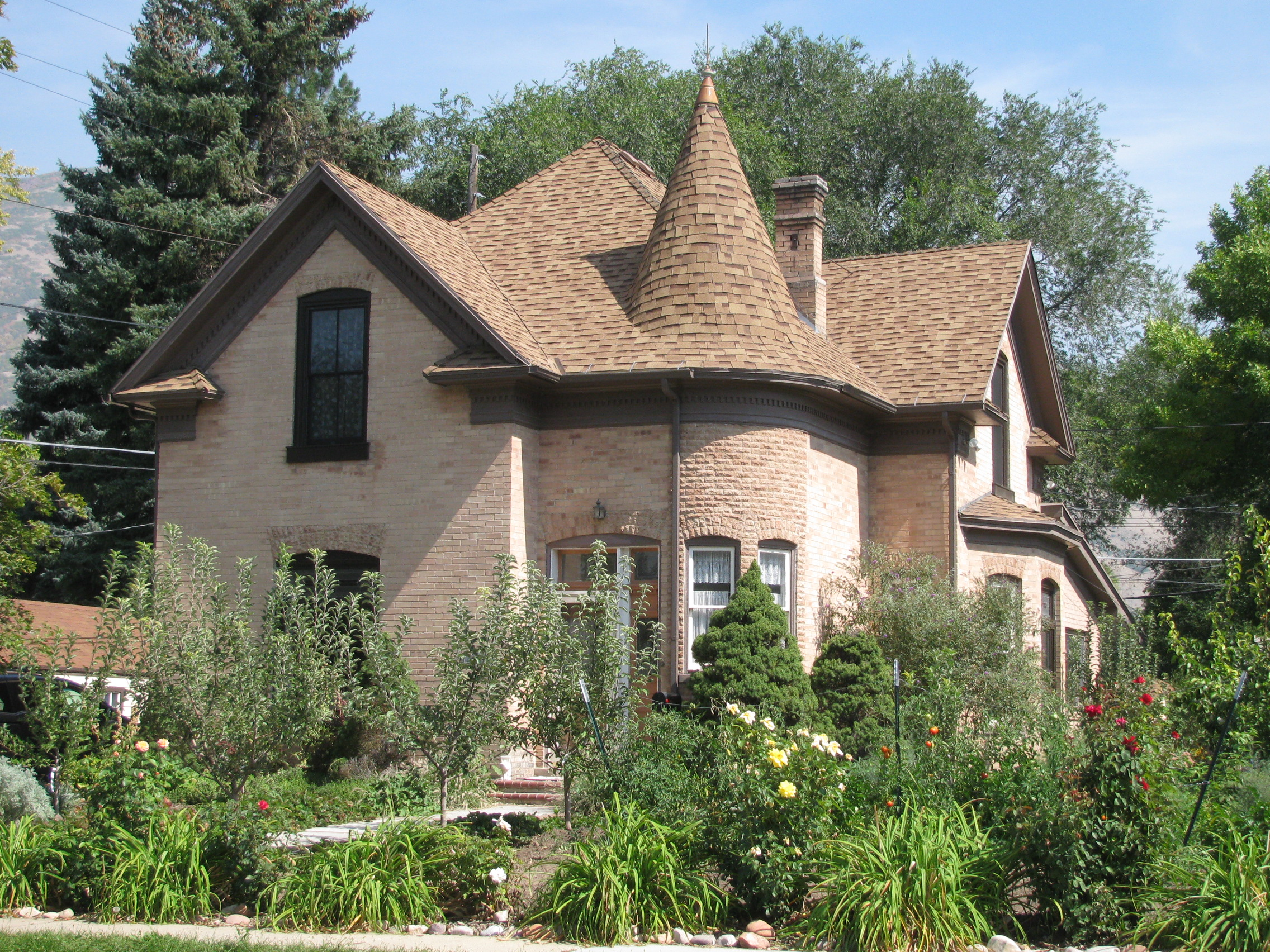
- Dallin House, September 2012

- Location within Utah Location within the United States
- Location: 253 South 300 East; Springville, Utah; United States
- Coordinates: 40°9′45″N 111°36′11″W
- Area: less than one acre
- Built: c.1905
- Built by: Lewis J. Whitney
- Architect: Lewis J. Whitney
- Architectural style: Late Victorian, Victorian eclectic
- NRHP reference No.: 94000346
- Added to NRHP: March 31, 1994

The Dallin House (also known as Thomas and Jane Dallin House) is a historic residence in Springville, Utah, United States. It was listed on the National Register of Historic Places in 1994.

== Description ==
The house is located within the boundaries of Springville Historic District. It was built in c. 1905. The residence is significant for its association with sculptor Cyrus E. Dallin (1861-1944).

== See also ==
- National Register of Historic Places in Utah County, Utah
- Taylor-Dallin House, Arlington, Massachusetts, also significant and NRHP-listed for association with Dallin.
- Cyrus E. Dallin Art Museum
