= Dalling Monastery =

Religion
- Affiliation: Tibetan Buddhism

Location
- Location: Sikkim
- Country: India
- Interactive map of Dalling Monastery
- Coordinates: 27.288°N 88.344°E

Architecture
- Established: 1840; 186 years ago

Dalling Monastery is a Buddhist monastery in Sikkim, northeastern India, built in 1840.

The name means "Thunderbolt".
