= Paul Revere Mall =

Corridor in Boston, Massachusetts, U.S.

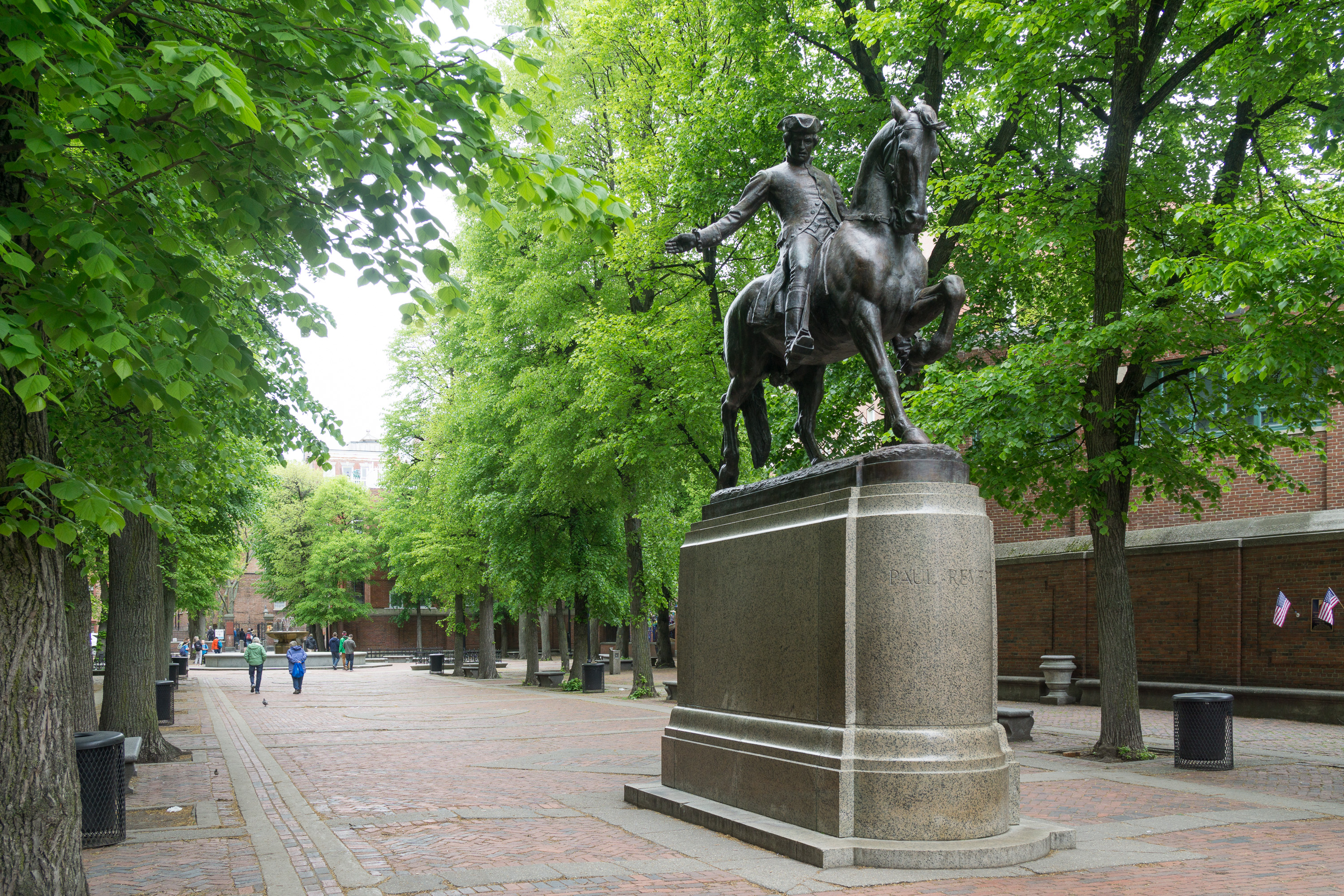
- The mall's equestrian statue of Paul Revere in 2017

- Location within Boston
- Part of: North End, Boston
- Location: Boston, Massachusetts, U.S.
- Coordinates: 42°21′57″N 71°3′13″W

Paul Revere Mall is a corridor in Boston's North End, in the U.S. state of Massachusetts.

== Description and history ==
The corridor was created in 1933 to connect Old North Church and Hanover Street. The mall features an equestrian statue of Paul Revere. Additionally, there are 13 plaques commemorating various Boston residents, mounted along the Prado's brick walls. The plaques were surveyed by the Smithsonian Institution's "Save Outdoor Sculpture!" program in 1993.

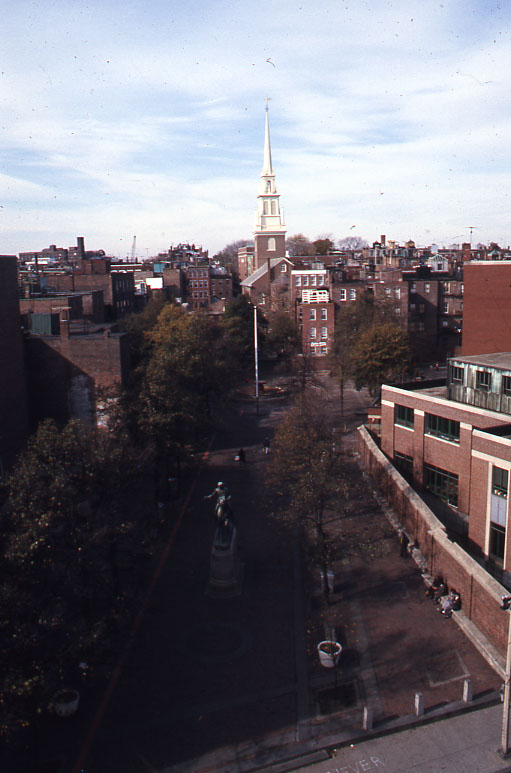
Aerial view of the mall, 1975

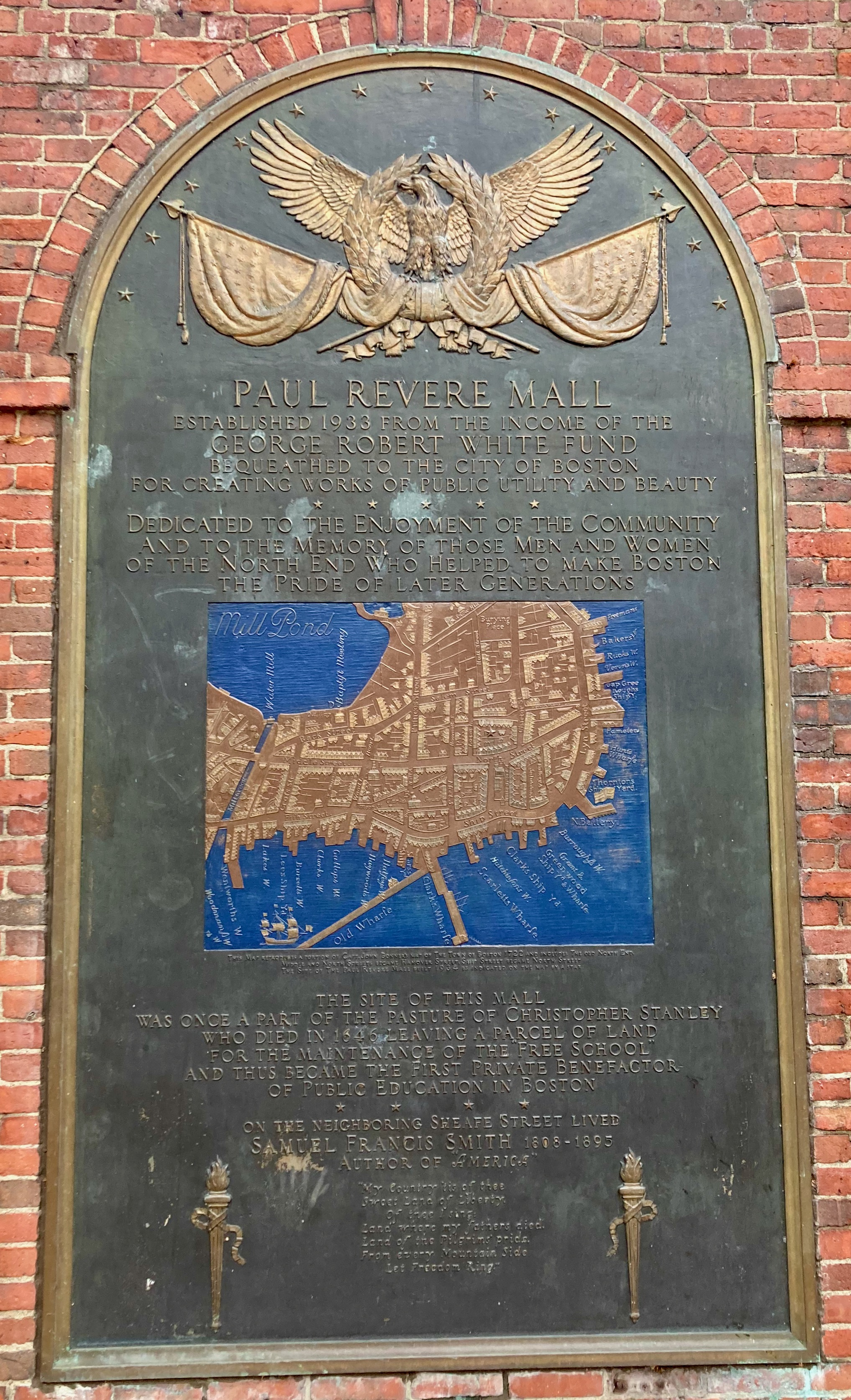
Original plaque

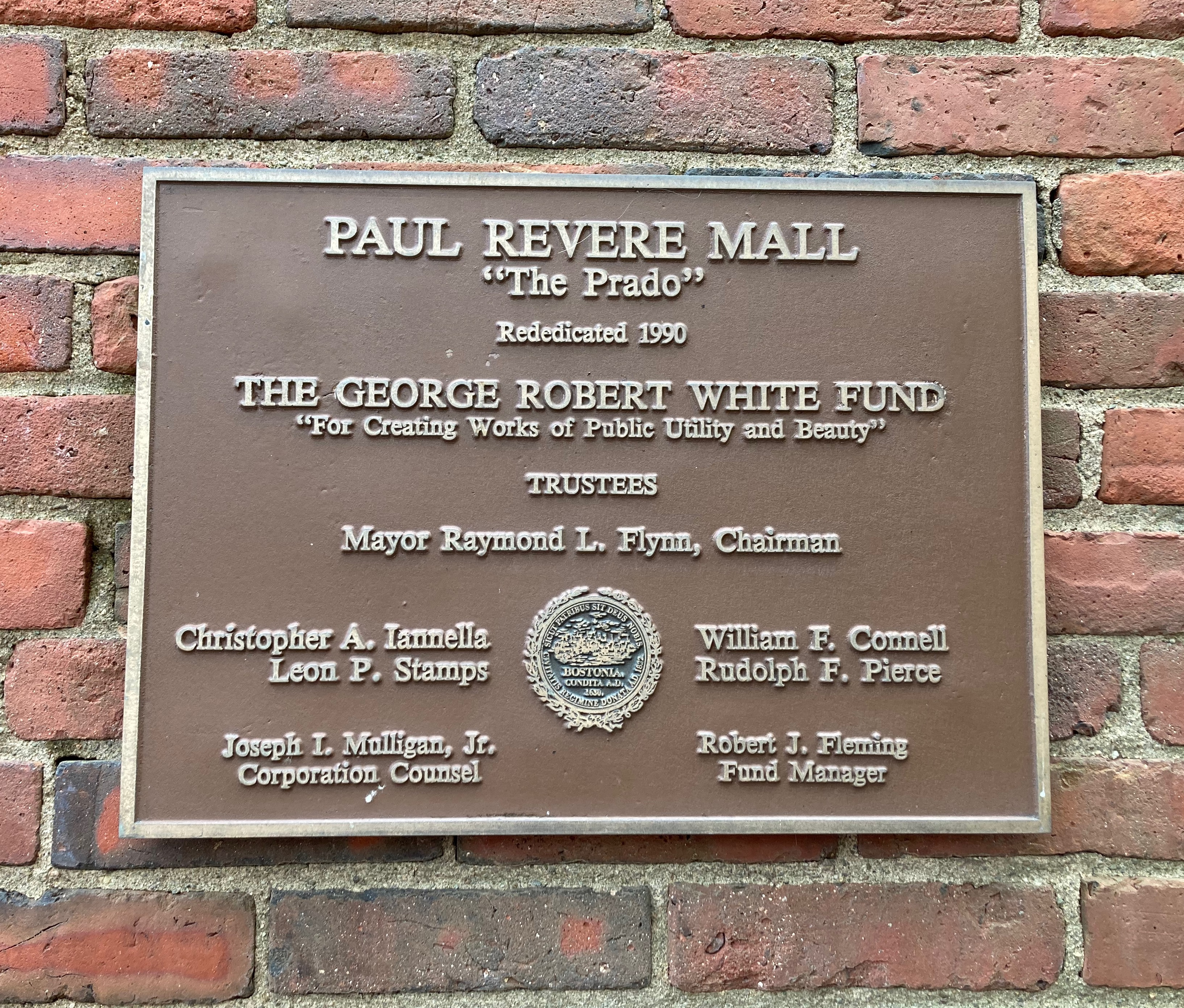
Rededication plaque
