= Elizabeth Nichols (singer) =

American singer-songwriter (born 2002)

- Born: Elizabeth Nichols; June 21, 2002 (age 24); Plano, Texas, U.S.
- Genre: Country
- Occupations: Singer; songwriter
- Instruments: Vocals; guitar
- Years active: 2024–present
- Label: Pulse Records
- Website: elizabethnichols.co/home

Elizabeth Nichols (born June 21, 2002) is an American country singer and songwriter. She was the June 2025 Billboard country rookie of the month, and debuted at the Grand Ole Opry on November 1, 2025.

== Early life ==
Born in Texas in 2002, Nichols is the daughter of a pastor and was raised on a farm near Louisville, Kentucky. She studied writing at Oral Roberts University in Tulsa, Oklahoma, where she completed a study abroad program in Melbourne, Australia, and also earned a Master of Business Administration degree. In August 2024, Nichols moved to Nashville, Tennessee, to pursue law school and music simultaneously, where she enrolled in the Belmont University College of Law. She released her debut single, "I Got a New One", in December 2024, and dropped out of law school around January 2025 to pursue music full-time.

== Career ==
In March 2025, Nichols signed with Pulse Records, the label led by co-executives Scott Cutler and Josh Abraham. In May, Kelly Clarkson covered "I Got a New One" on The Kelly Clarkson Show, and Nichols was named "country rookie of the month" by Billboard that June. Nichols has said that writing songs helps her process events that happen to her.

In October 2025, she posted snippets of her satirical unreleased song "Might Go MAGA" to TikTok, which went viral. She has said that she intentionally does not explain the symbolism of her lyrics, allowing her listeners to form their own interpretations and reactions. The following month, on November 1, 2025, Nichols made her debut at the Grand Ole Opry. In January 2026, Taste of Country named her an "artist to watch" in 2026. She appeared on The Kelly Clarkson Show in April, singing "I Got a New One"; she described appearing on the show herself as a "full-circle" moment from the cover that boosted her career.
