= Taylor-Dallin House =

Historic house in Massachusetts, United States

- U.S. National Register of Historic Places
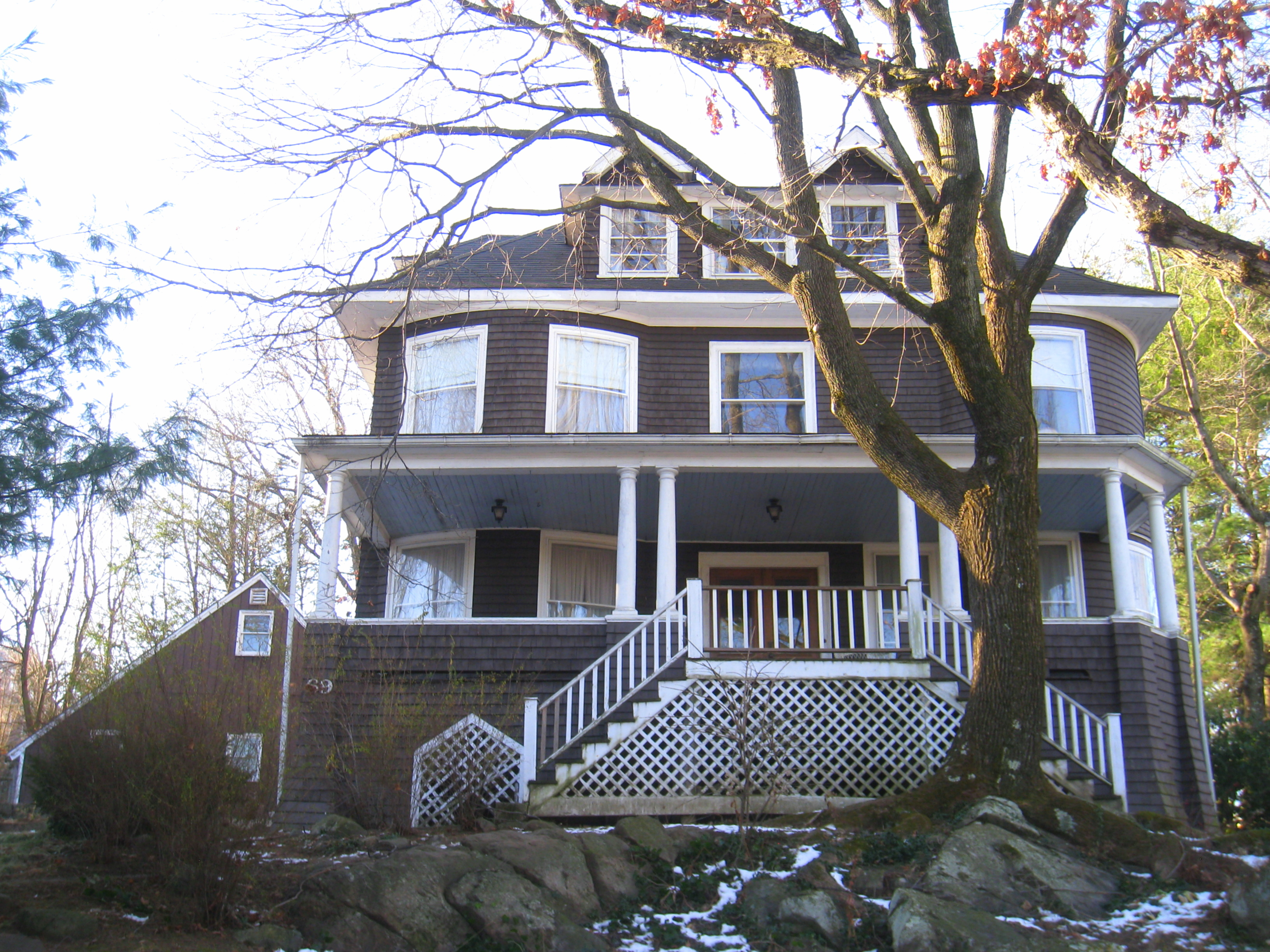

- Location within Massachusetts Location within the United States
- Location: 69 Oakland Avenue, Arlington, Massachusetts
- Coordinates: 42°25′11″N 71°10′45″W
- Architectural style: Colonial Revival, Shingle Style
- MPS: Arlington MRA
- NRHP reference No.: 85002689
- Added to NRHP: September 27, 1985

The Taylor-Dallin House is a historic house in Arlington, Massachusetts. The house is notable as being the home of sculptor Cyrus E. Dallin (1861–1944) from 1899 until his death. It is a Colonial Revival/Shingle style 2 1/2-story wood-frame structure, with a hip roof studded with dormers, and a front porch supported by Tuscan columns. The house was built c. 1898 by Jack Taylor and sold to Dallin in 1899. Dallin's studio, no longer extant, stood in the rear of the property. Dallin was one of Arlington's most well-known citizens of the early 20th century, and his sculptures are found in several public settings around the town.

The house was listed on the National Register of Historic Places in 1985.

== See also ==
- Dallin House, his birthplace in Springville, Utah
- National Register of Historic Places listings in Arlington, Massachusetts
- Cyrus E. Dallin Art Museum
- List of sculptures by Cyrus Dallin in Massachusetts
