= List of Saint Anselm College alumni =

Saint Anselm College is a Benedictine college in Goffstown, New Hampshire. Following are some of its notable alumni.

== Academia and education ==
- William J. Baroody Sr. (1936), president of American Enterprise Institute, and chairman of the Woodrow Wilson International Center for Scholars
- Michael McKeown Bondhus, poet, author, and teacher of English and creative writing at Raritan Valley Community College
- Joyce Clifford, chief nurse at Beth Israel Deaconess Medical Center and member of the Harvard Medical School faculty
- Vincent Colapietro (1973), philosophy professor at Pennsylvania State University, author of many published articles and several published books
- Joseph Grigely (1978), visual artist and professor of Visual and Critical Studies at the School of the Art Institute of Chicago
- William C. Martel (1977), associate professor of international security studies at the Fletcher School, Tufts University
- Nancy McGovern, digital preservation pioneer, archivist with the Center for Electronic Records at the National Archives and Records Administration and the Open Society Archives (Budapest, Hungary)
- William J. Murnane, Egyptologist, author, director of the Great Hypostyle Hall Project at Luxor Karnak Temple, research associate and professor at the Institute of Egyptian Art & Archaeology at the University of Memphis
- Frank V. Thompson (1896), educator who served as superintendent of Boston Public Schools

== Business ==
- Joseph Boivin, co-founder and first president of the first credit union established in the United States
- Rómulo O'Farril (1937), multi-millionaire Mexican businessman; founder of Televisa in Mexico City
- Matthew Szulik (1978), former chief executive officer and president of the S&P 500 Red Hat software company

== Entertainment ==
- Michael Buckley (1997), YouTube celebrity host of the WhattheBuck!? show
- Lauren Chooljian (2010, H.D. 2024), radio journalist for New Hampshire Public Radio
- Jay Larson (1999), comedian, actor, and writer
- Rob Surette (1993), speed-painter and public speaker
- Keven Undergaro, creator of online broadcast network AfterBuzz TV and writer and producer for film and television

== Law ==
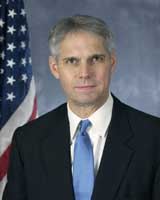
Former director of the U.S. Secret Service Mark J. Sullivan

- Gerard Conley Jr., assistant Maine attorney general and member of the Maine House of Representatives
- Aaron Frey (2001), attorney general of Maine and former Maine state representative
- Daniel T. K. Hurley (1964), lawyer and judge, serving on the United States District Court for the Southern District of Florida
- Martin F. Loughlin (1947), lawyer and judge, served on the United States District Court for the District of New Hampshire
- Jim McDonnell (1981), chief of the Los Angeles Police Department and former sheriff of Los Angeles County, recipient of the LAPD Medal of Valor
- Leo J. Sullivan, commissioner of the Boston Police Department
- Mark J. Sullivan (1977), former director of United States Secret Service
- Jane E. Young (1986), United States attorney for the District of New Hampshire

== Military ==
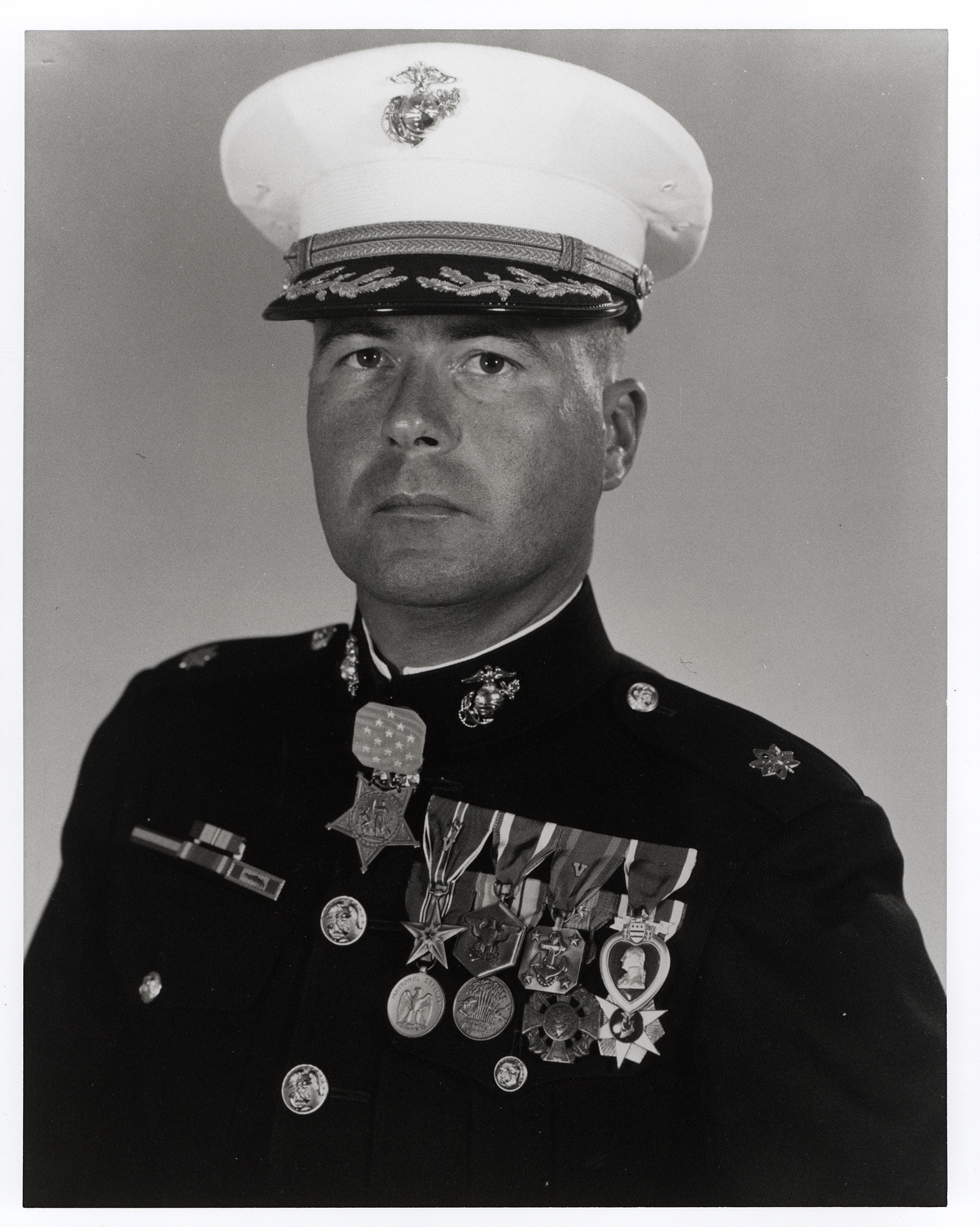
Col. Harvey C. Barnum, Jr., USMC (Ret.)

- Harvey C. Barnum Jr. (1962), assistant secretary of the Navy (Manpower and Reserve Affairs) and Medal of Honor recipient (Vietnam); namesake of the USS Harvey C. Barnum Jr.
- Henry J. Meade (1951), chief of chaplains of the U.S. Air Force

== Politics ==
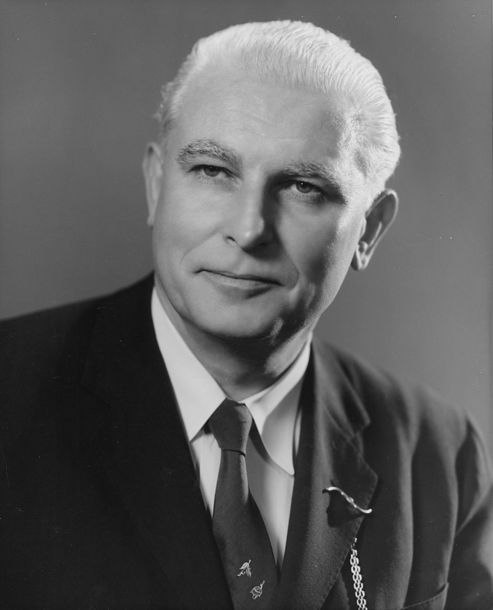
Former U.S. Senator Thomas J. Dodd

- Skip Bafalis (1952), member of the United States House of Representatives from Florida's 10th congressional district, 1973–1983
- King Banaian (1979), Minnesota state representative
- Laurent Belanger, Florida House of Representatives
- Robert F. Bossie (1963), former New Hampshire state senator (1972–1977)
- Ross Brown, Green politician in Northern Ireland; shadow councilor on Belfast City Council
- Peter Clavelle, mayor of Burlington, Vermont
- Gerard Conley Jr., assistant Maine attorney general and member of the Maine House of Representatives
- Sean Curran, Massachusetts House of Representatives
- David Danielson, New Hampshire House of Representatives
- Thomas J. Dodd (1926), U.S. senator from Connecticut; influential force at the Nuremberg Trials
- Kevin W. Fitzgerald, Massachusetts House of Representatives
- Aaron Frey (2001), attorney general of Maine and former Maine state representative
- Bill Gannon (1984), New Hampshire state senator and former state representative
- Jeffery Hayward, Massachusetts House of Representatives
- Robert W. Heagney (1975), Connecticut state representative
- Daniel F. Keenan, Massachusetts House of Representatives
- Frank J. Kozacka, New Hampshire House of Representatives
- Karoline Leavitt (2019), 36th White House press secretary
- Henri Martin, Connecticut State Senate
- Michael J. McGlynn, Massachusetts House of Representatives
- Ralph Mollis (1978), former secretary of state of Rhode Island
- William P. Nagle Jr. (1973), Massachusetts House of Representatives
- Pam Patenaude (1983), former U.S. deputy secretary of Housing and Urban Development
- Robert Preston (non-degreed), New Hampshire Senate
- Donna Soucy, New Hampshire Senate and New Hampshire House of Representatives
- Chris Spirou, New Hampshire House of Representatives
- Edward B. Teague III, Massachusetts House of Representatives
- Jordan Ulery, member of the New Hampshire House of Representatives
- Roland S. Vallee, 43rd mayor of Manchester, New Hampshire
- Joshua Whitehouse (non-degreed), member of the New Hampshire House of Representatives

== Religion ==
- Jonathan DeFelice (1969), Catholic priest and president emeritus of Saint Anselm College
- Mark Dyer (1959), bishop of the Episcopal Diocese of Bethlehem
- Joseph John Gerry (1950), former bishop of Portland, Maine, and former abbot of Saint Anselm Abbey
- Gérald Lacroix (1975; non-degreed), Roman Catholic cardinal, archbishop of Quebec and primate of Canada
- Henry J. Meade (1951), chief of chaplains of the U.S. Air Force
- Thomas Edmund Molloy (non-degreed), prelate of the Catholic Church and bishop of Brooklyn 1921–1956
- Leo Edward O'Neil (non-degreed), former bishop of the Diocese of Manchester (1990–1997)
- John Bertram Peterson (1895), bishop of the Diocese of Manchester in New Hampshire 1932–1944
- Joseph Rummel (1896), archbishop of New Orleans and civil rights activist who desegregated New Orleans Catholic Schools in 1962
- Nicholas Samra, eparchial bishop emeritus of the Melkite Catholic Eparchy of Newton and Apostolic Administrator of the Melkite Greek Catholic Eparchy of Nuestra Señora del Paraíso in Mexico City
- Robert Joseph Shaheen (non-degreed), prelate of the Maronite Catholic Church; former eparch of the Maronite Catholic Eparchy of Our Lady of Lebanon of Los Angeles

== Sports ==
- Chris Bagley, professional soccer player
- Nick Barese, college baseball coach
- Keith Beauregard, professional baseball player and coach
- Bill Chamberlain, professional baseball player
- Jerry Conway, professional baseball player
- Elad Covaliu, professional gridiron football player
- Sharon Dawley (1979), head coach of the University of Massachusetts Amherst women's basketball team
- Pat Delany, professional basketball coach
- Matt DelGuidice, professional ice hockey player
- Sam Ftorek, former professional ice hockey player
- Tim Karalexis (2001), professional soccer player in the USL First Division
- Rob Kelly, professional baseball player
- Mark Krikorian, sports executive and former professional soccer coach
- Kevin Mackey, former head coach of men's college basketball
- Hubie McDonough (1986), NHL player for the Los Angeles Kings, San Jose Sharks and the New York Islanders
- Warren McGuirk, longtime athletic director, University of Massachusetts Amherst (UMass)
- Ray "Scooter" McLean (1940), NFL player for the Chicago Bears and coach of the Green Bay Packers
- Jim Mill, professional ice hockey player
- Kevin Nylen, college soccer coach
- Tom Padden, professional baseball player
- Emil Roy, professional baseball player
- John Spirida, professional football player
