= Covaliu =

Covaliu is a surname. Notable people with the surname include:

- Elad Covaliu (born 1994), American gridiron football player
- Mihai Covaliu (born 1977), Romanian fencer
- Vlad Covaliu (born 2005), Romanian fencer
