= Thomas Ebright Memorial Award =

US ice hockey award

The Thomas Ebright Memorial Award is presented annually for outstanding career contributions to the American Hockey League. The award is named for Thomas Ebright, the former owner of the Portland Pirates and Baltimore Skipjacks. Ebright was a longtime member of the Board of Governors until his death in 1997.

== Winners ==
Season	Recipient
1997–98	Jack Butterfield
1998–99	Gordon Anziano
1999–00	Bryan Lewis
2000–01	Bill Torrey
2001–02	Bruce Landon
2002–03	Bill Watters
2003–04	Roy Boe
2003–04	Jack Kelley
2004–05	Glenn Stanford
2005–06	Al Coates
2006–07	Frank Miceli
2007–08	Doug Yingst
2008–09	Jim Mill
2009–10	Tom Mitchell
2010–11	Mark Chipman
2011–12	Lyman G. Bullard, Jr.
2012–13	Jeff Barrett
2013–14	Howard Dolgon
2014–15	Michael Andlauer
2015–16	Jim Schoenfeld
2016–17	Craig Heisinger
2017–18	Wendell Young
2018–19	Todd Frederickson
2019–20	David Andrews
2020–21	Jon Gustafson
2021–22	Kevin McDonald
2022–23	Mark Bernard
