= House at 5 Willow Court =

Historic house in Massachusetts, United States

- U.S. National Register of Historic Places
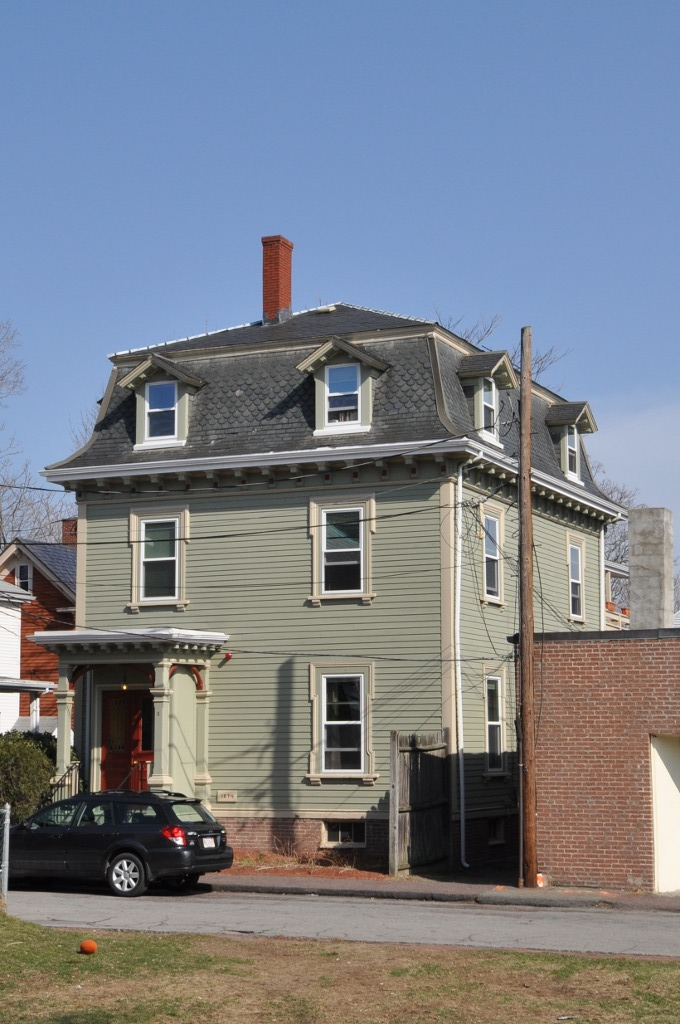
- A photo of the house, taken in 2008

- Location within Massachusetts Location within the United States
- Location: 5 Willow Ct., Arlington, Massachusetts
- Coordinates: 42°25′1″N 71°9′33″W
- Built: 1874
- Architectural style: Second Empire
- MPS: Arlington MRA
- NRHP reference No.: 85001038
- Added to NRHP: April 18, 1985

The house at 5 Willow Court in Arlington, Massachusetts is a rare local example of Second Empire styling.

== Description and history ==
The house originally stood on Massachusetts Avenue (its construction date is not known), and was moved to its present site as that road developed more commercially in the 1930s. It has a mansard roof typical of the style, and its windows are topped by eared surrounds. The mansard roof is flared at the base, with a bracketed eave, and is pierced by gabled dormers.

The house was listed on the National Register of Historic Places on April 18, 1985.

== See also ==
- National Register of Historic Places listings in Arlington, Massachusetts
