= Henry Swan House =

Historic house in Massachusetts, United States

- U.S. National Register of Historic Places
- U.S. Historic district – Contributing property
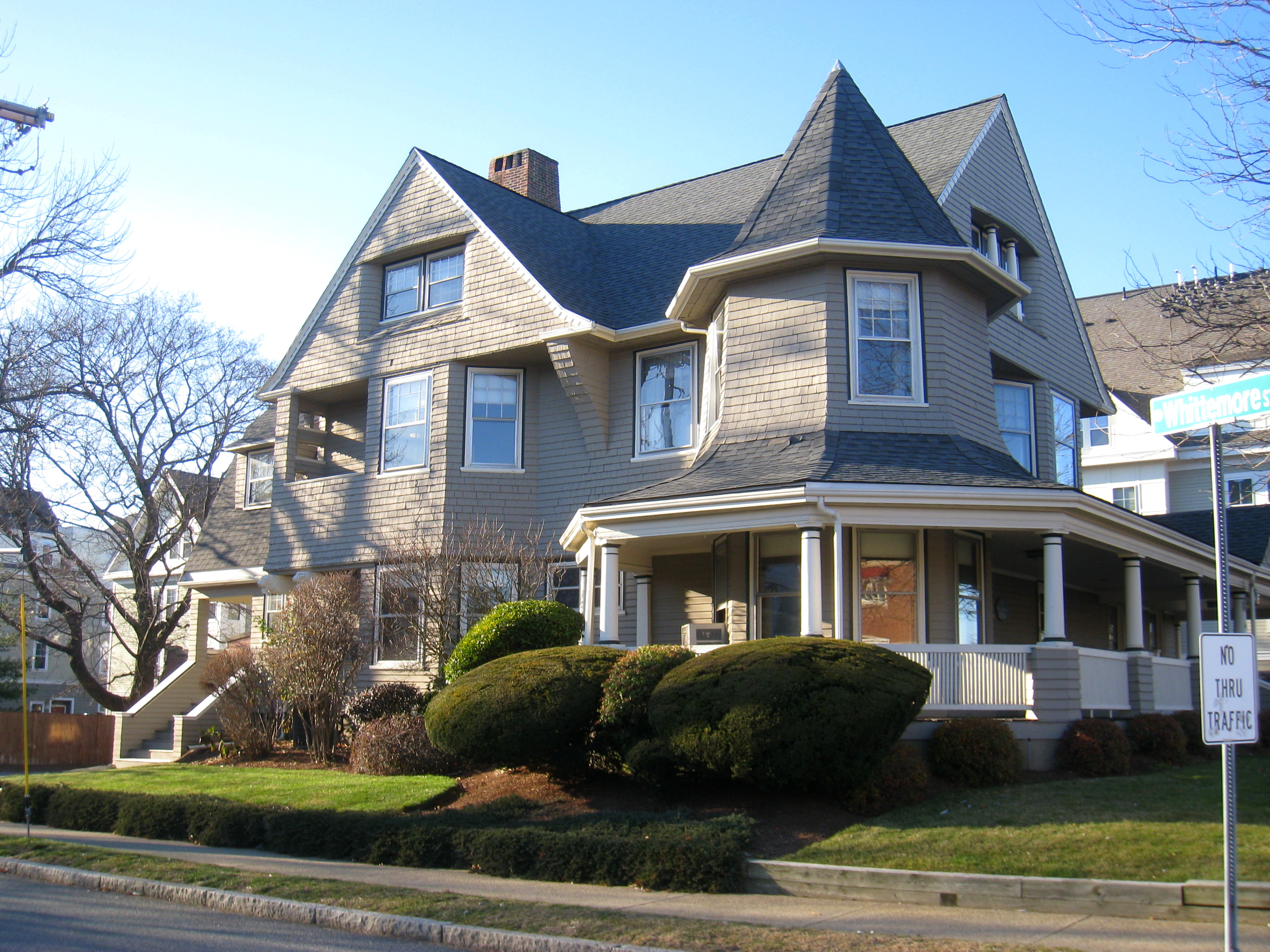

- Location within Massachusetts Location within the United States
- Location: 418 Massachusetts Avenue, Arlington, Massachusetts
- Coordinates: 42°24′49″N 71°9′3″W
- Built: 1888
- Architectural style: Queen Anne, Shingle Style
- Part of: Arlington Center Historic District (ID85002691)
- MPS: Arlington MRA
- NRHP reference No.: 85002688

Significant dates
- Added to NRHP: September 27, 1985
- Designated CP: September 27, 1985

The Henry Swan House is a historic house in Arlington, Massachusetts. The 2 1/2-story wood-frame house was built in 1888 by Henry Swan, a Boston poultry dealer who was also active in local politics. The house is a well-preserved example of the sort of late Victorian houses that were once much more typical along Massachusetts Avenue.

The house was listed on the National Register of Historic Places in 1985, and was also included that year in an expansion of the Arlington Center Historic District.

== See also ==
- National Register of Historic Places listings in Arlington, Massachusetts
