= Arlington, Massachusetts =

- Town
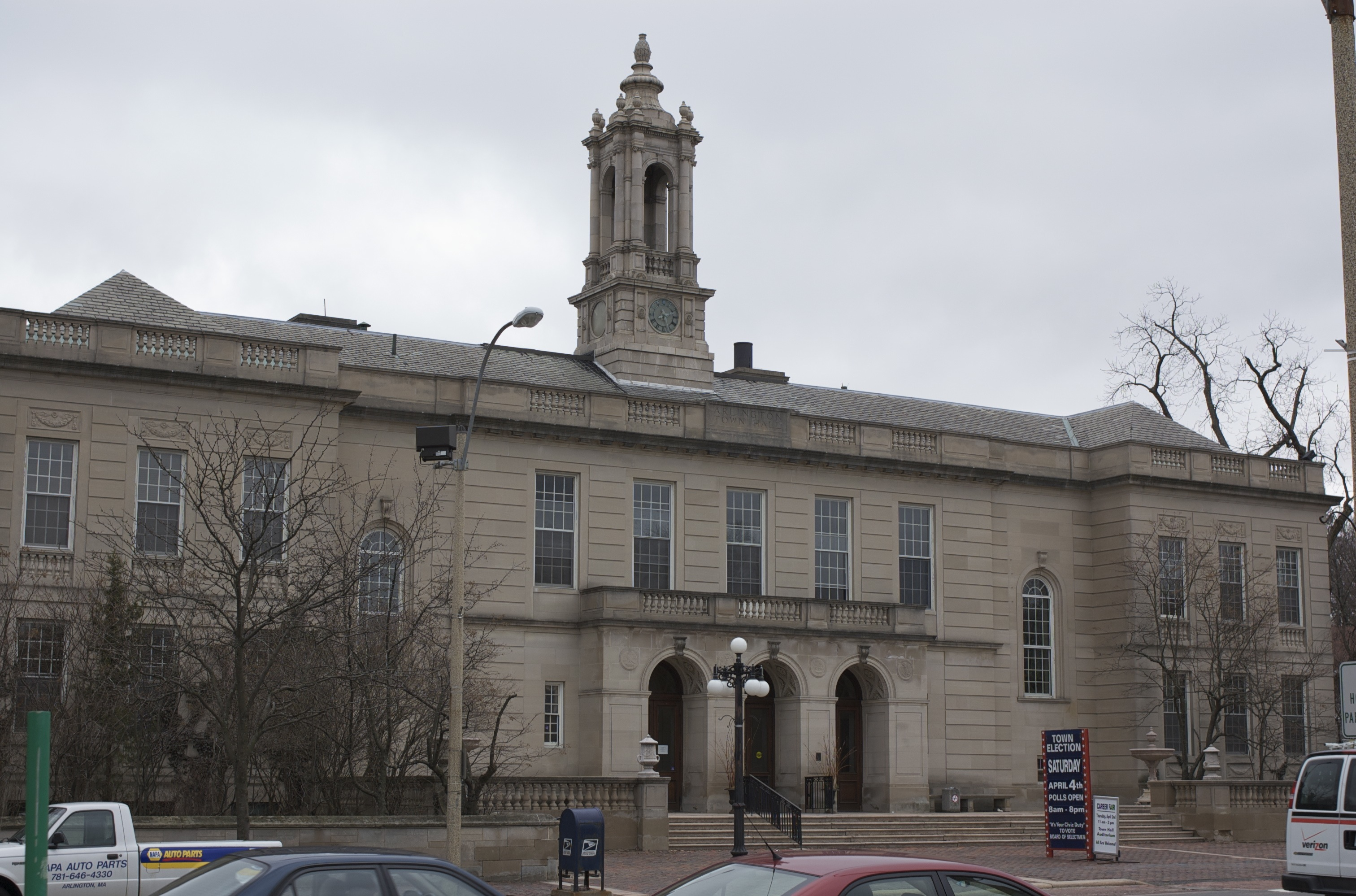
- Arlington Town Hall

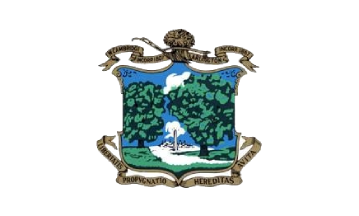
- Flag Coat of arms
- Motto: Libertatis Propugnatio Hereditas Avita (Latin) "The Defense of Liberty Is Our Ancestral Heritage"
- Location in Massachusetts

- Location within Massachusetts Location within the United States Location within North America
- Coordinates: 42°24′55″N 71°09′25″W
- Country: United States
- State: Massachusetts
- County: Middlesex
- Settled: 1635
- Incorporated: 1807
- Renamed: 1867

Government
  - Type: Representative town meeting
  - Town Manager: Jim Feeney
  - Select Board: Stephen W. DeCourcey; Lenard Diggins; Eric D. Helmuth (chair); John V. Hurd; Diane M. Mahon

Area
  - Total: 5.496 sq mi (14.235 km^{2})
  - Land: 5.049 sq mi (13.077 km^{2})
  - Water: 0.447 sq mi (1.158 km^{2})
- Elevation: 46 ft (14 m)

Population (2020)
  - Total: 46,308
  - Density: 9,171.6/sq mi (3,541.18/km^{2})
- Time zone: UTC−5 (Eastern)
  - Summer (DST): UTC−4 (Eastern)
- ZIP Codes: 02474, 02476
- Area code: 339 / 781
- FIPS code: 25-01605
- GNIS feature ID: 0619393
- Website: www.arlingtonma.gov

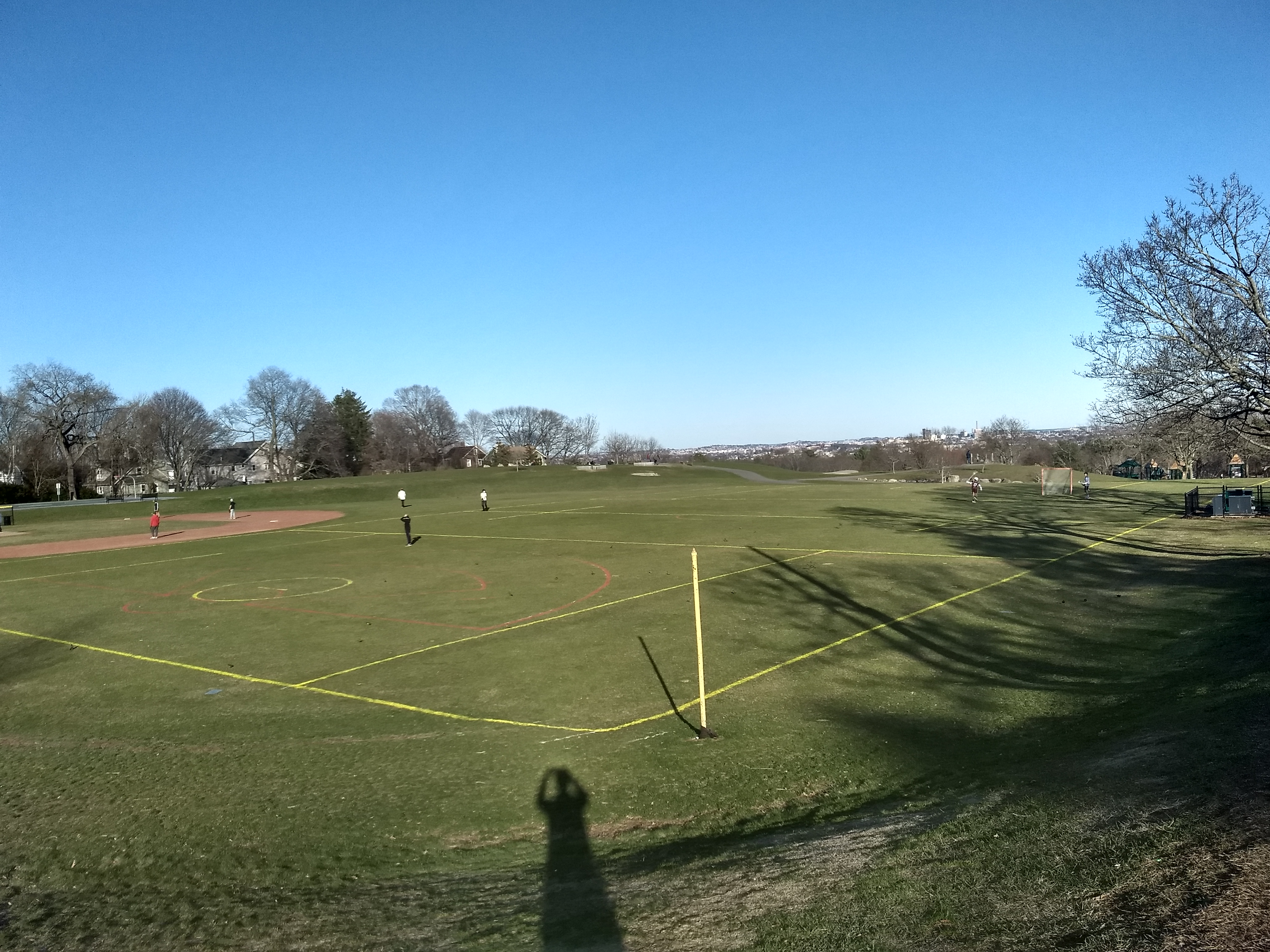
Robbins Farm Park

Arlington is a town in Middlesex County, Massachusetts, United States. The town is six miles (10 km) northwest of Boston, and its population was 46,308 at the 2020 census.

== History ==
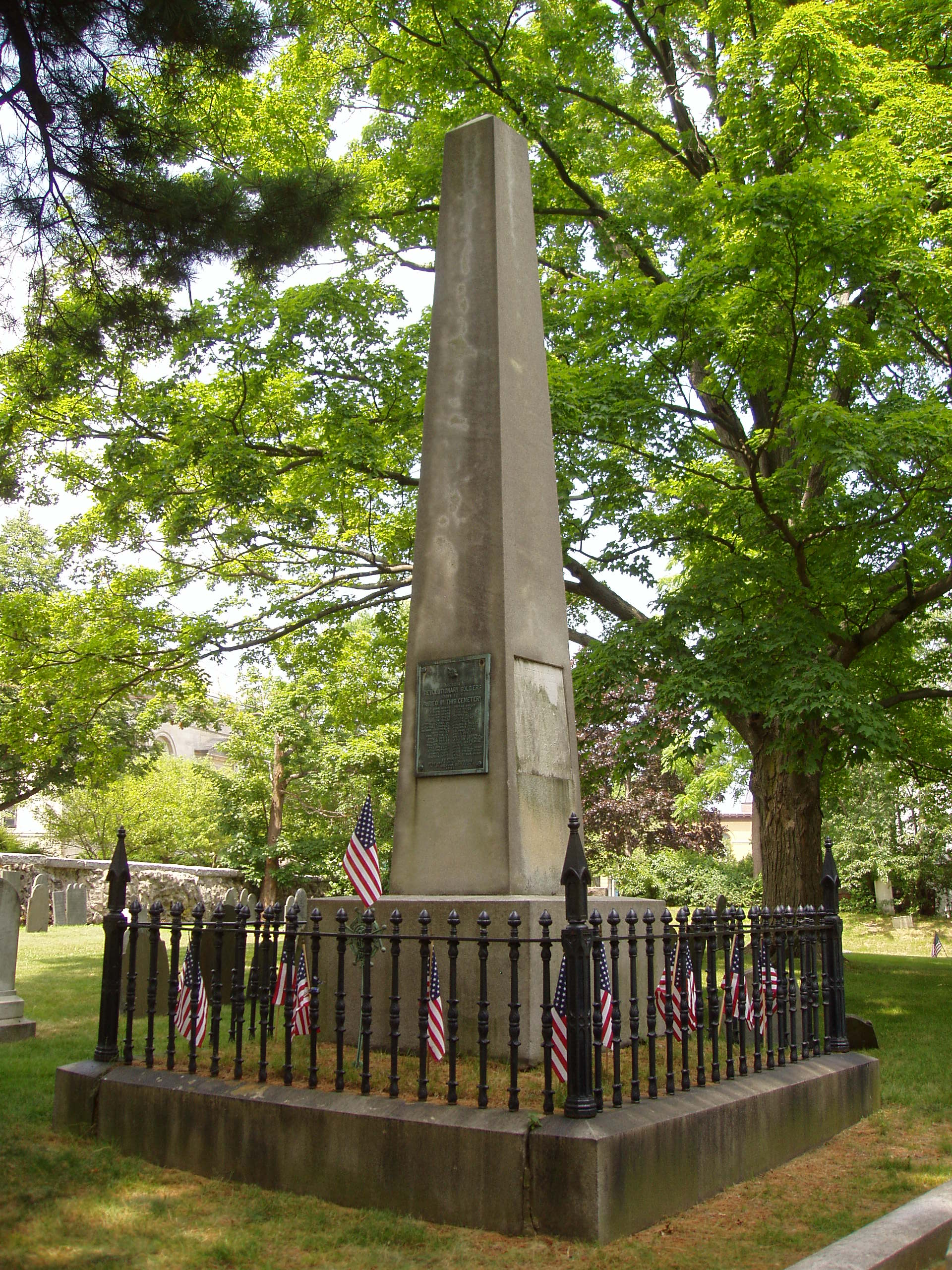
Patriots' Grave in the Old Burying Ground

European colonists settled the Town of Arlington in 1635 as a village within the boundaries of Cambridge, Massachusetts, under the name Menotomy, an Algonquian word considered by some to mean "swift running water", though linguistic anthropologists dispute that translation. A larger area was incorporated on February 27, 1807, as West Cambridge, replacing Menotomy. This includes the town of Belmont, and outwards to the shore of the Mystic River, which had previously been part of Charlestown. The town was renamed Arlington on April 30, 1867, in honor of those buried in Arlington National Cemetery.

The Massachusett tribe lived around the Mystic Lakes, the Mystic River, and Alewife Brook. Chief Nanepashemet was killed by a rival tribe in about 1619, and Nanepashemet's widow "Squaw Sachem of Mistick" became the acknowledged leader of the tribe. In 1639, she deeded the land of what was then Cambridge and Watertown to the colonists. She lived her last years on the west side of the Mystic Lakes near Medford, where she died sometime between 1650 and 1667.

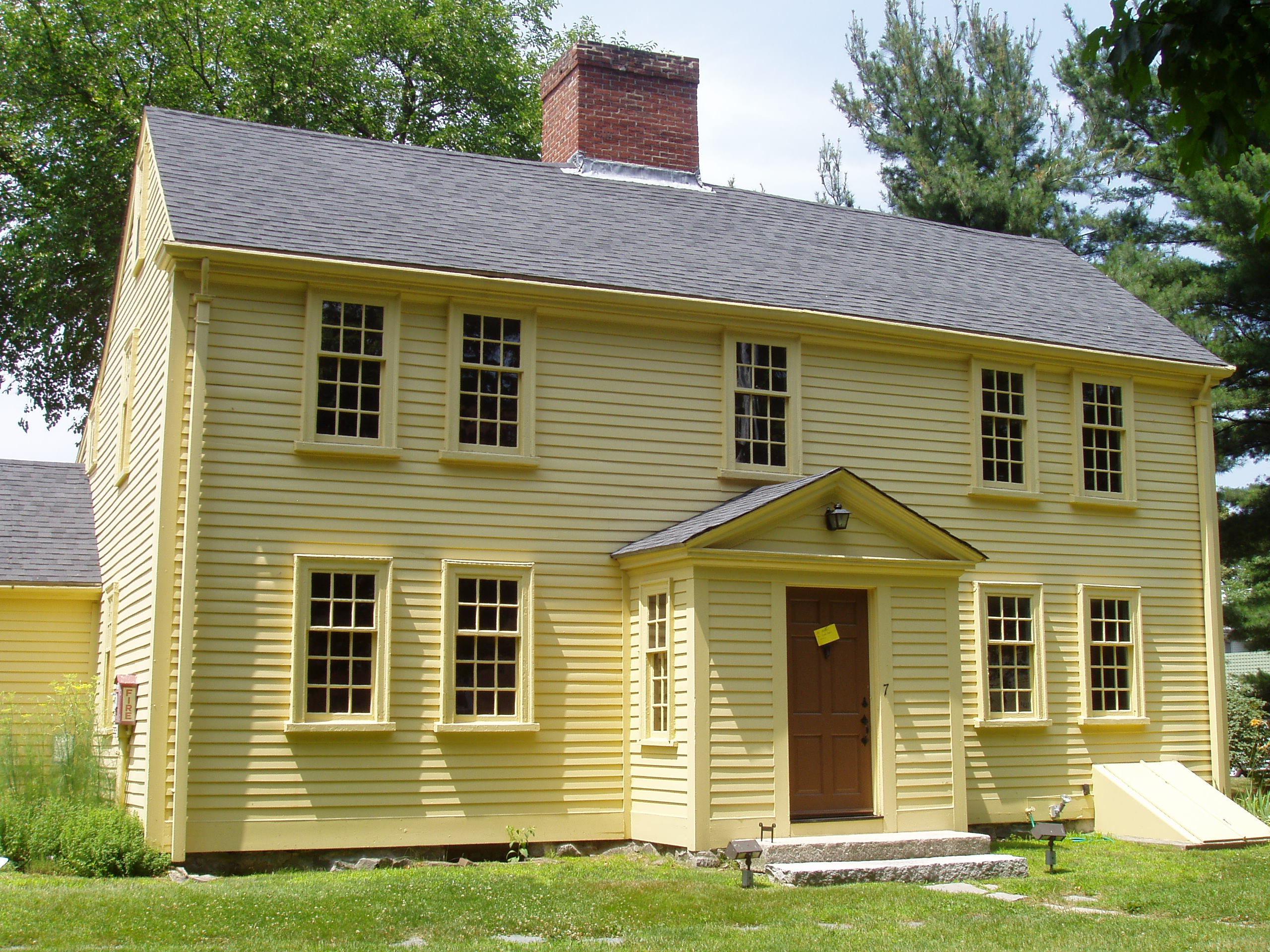
The Jason Russell House

A stream called Mill Brook flows through the town, which historically figured largely into Arlington's economy. In 1637, Captain George Cooke built the first mill in this area. Subsequently, seven mills were built along the stream, including the Old Schwamb Mill, which still survives. The Schwamb Mill has been a working mill since 1650, making it the longest working mill in the country.

Paul Revere's midnight ride to alert colonists took him through Menotomy, now known as Arlington. Later on that first day of the American Revolution, more blood was shed in Menotomy than in the battles of Lexington and Concord combined. Minutemen from surrounding towns converged on Menotomy to ambush the British on their retreat from Concord and Lexington. Twenty-five Americans were killed in Menotomy, half of all Americans killed in the day's battles, as well as 40 British troops (more than half their fatalities). Arlington resident Cyrus Dallin would later create an iconic sculpture of the midnight rider; a version can be seen at the town's Cyrus Dallin Art Museum.

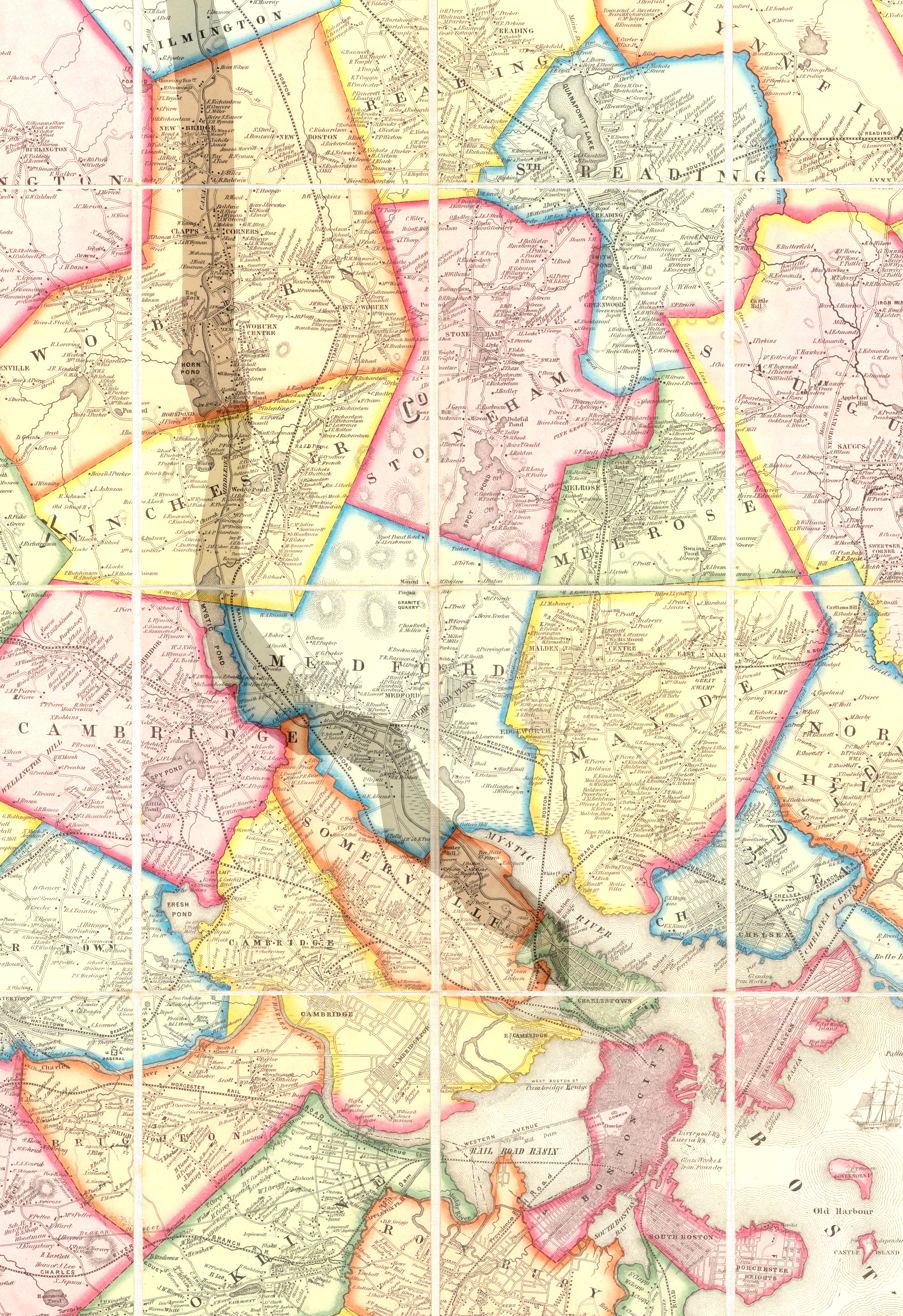
1852 Map of Boston area showing Arlington, then called West Cambridge. The former Middlesex Canal is highlighted.

The Jason Russell House is a museum which remembers those 12 Americans who were killed in and around this pictured dwelling on April 19, 1775. Bullet holes are visible in the interior walls to this day.

In its early years, Arlington was a thriving farming community and had its own lettuce that was quite popular. Arlington had a large ice industry on Spy Pond from the mid-19th century until the last ice house burned down in 1930; much of its ice was sent to the Caribbean and India by "Ice King" Frederic Tudor.

Arlington's population grew by over 90 percent during the 1920s. In 1979, the first spreadsheet software program VisiCalc was developed by Bob Frankston and Dan Bricklin in the attic of the Arlington apartment rented by Frankston.

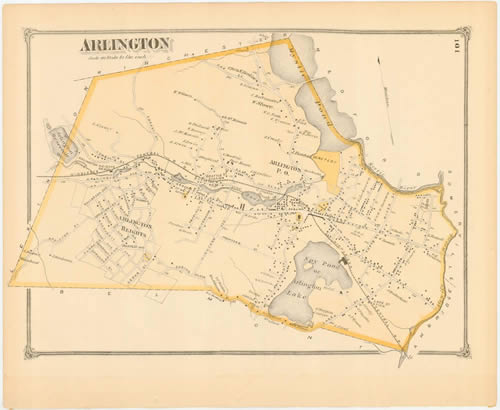
An 1875 map of Arlington

== Geography and infrastructure ==
Arlington covers 3,517.5 acres (14 km^{2}), or 5.5 square miles, of which 286.2 acres (1.2 km^{2}), or 0.4 square miles, are covered by water. There are 210.52 acres (0.9 km^{2}) of parkland. Elevation ranges from 4 feet (1.2 m) above sea level (along Alewife Brook) to 377 feet (114.9 m) near Park Avenue and Eastern Avenue.

Arlington borders on the Mystic Lakes, Mystic River, and Alewife Brook. Within its borders are Spy Pond, the Arlington Reservoir, Mill Brook, and Hills Pond.

=== Neighborhoods ===
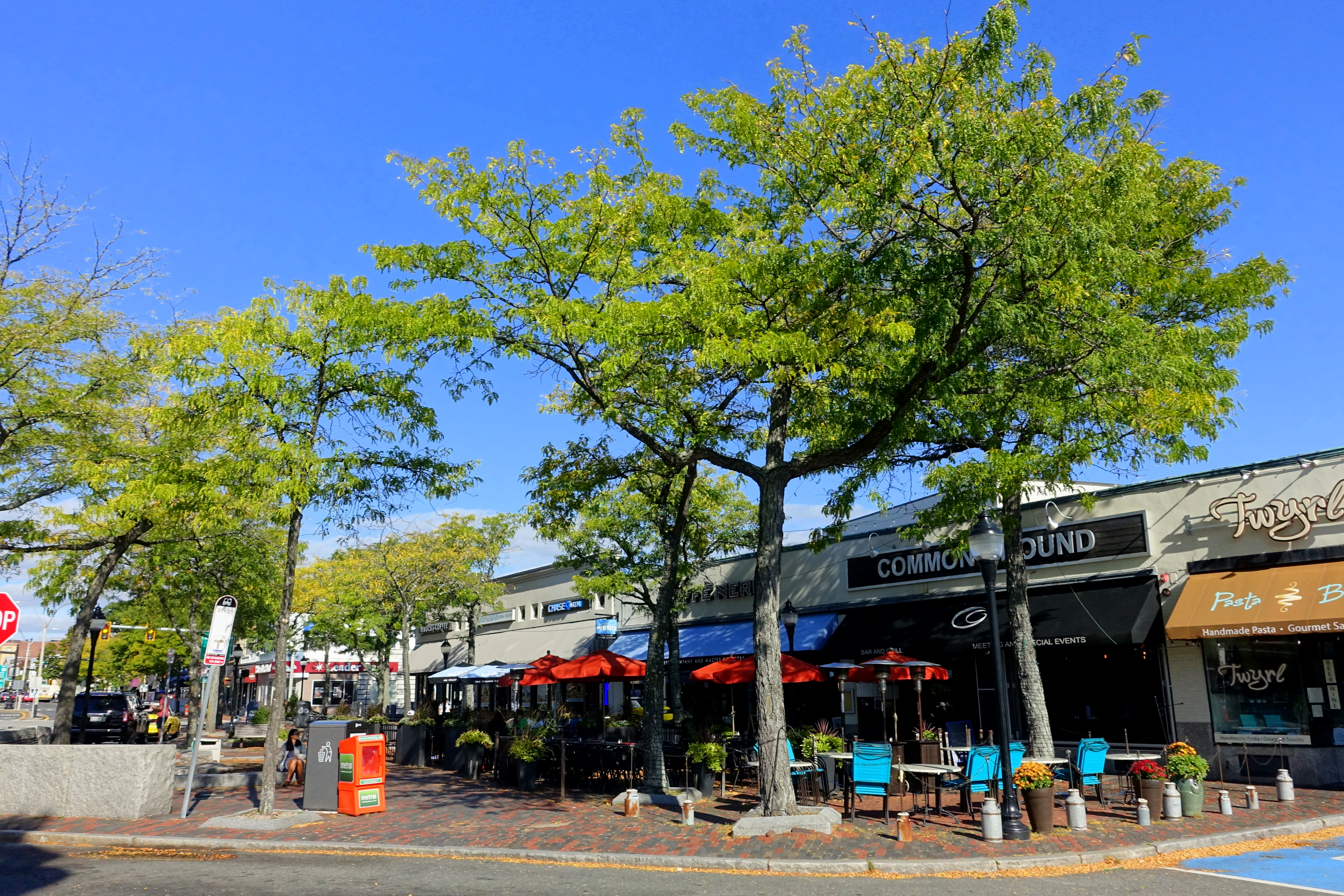
Arlington Center in 2019

- Arlington Center
- Arlington Heights, in the west
- East Arlington, east of Franklin Street
- Jason Heights
- Arlmont Village
- Morningside
- North Union
- Turkey Hill
- Little Scotland
- Brattle Sq.
- Poets' Corner
- Kelwyn Manor
- Quincy Heights, a neighborhood in Arlington Heights

Colloquially, Arlington Heights refers to all neighborhoods west of Arlington Center

=== ZIP Codes ===
- 02474: East Arlington, and most of the rest of the town north of the Minuteman Bikeway
- 02476: Arlington Heights, and most of the rest of the town south of the Bikeway and west of Spy Pond

=== Adjacent municipalities ===
Arlington is located in eastern Massachusetts and is bordered by the cities of Medford to the northeast, Somerville to the east, Cambridge to the southeast, and the towns of Winchester to the north, Lexington to the west, and Belmont to the south.

=== Transportation ===
Several MBTA bus routes pass through the town, including the: 62, 67, 76, 77, 78, 80, 84, 87, and 350.

The Minuteman Bikeway also runs through the center of town, connecting residents by bike to Bedford, Lexington, the Alewife Red Line station and Boston.

Route 2 is a limited access highway that runs along the southern border of Arlington with Belmont.

In 2025, Massachusetts governor Maura Healey signed legislation repealing Chapter 439 of The Acts of 1976, which blocked the MBTA Red Line from extending into Arlington. However, no plans to extend it have been announced.

== Demographics ==
Historical population
Year	Pop.	±%
1850	2,202	—
1860	2,681	+21.8%
1870	3,261	+21.6%
1880	4,100	+25.7%
1890	5,029	+22.7%
1900	8,603	+71.1%
1910	11,187	+30.0%
1920	18,665	+66.8%
1930	36,094	+93.4%
1940	40,013	+10.9%
1950	44,353	+10.8%
1960	49,953	+12.6%
1970	53,524	+7.1%
1980	48,219	−9.9%
1990	44,630	−7.4%
2000	42,389	−5.0%
2010	42,844	+1.1%
2020	46,308	+8.1%
2024*	47,112	+1.7%
* = population estimate. Source: United States Census records and Population Estimates Program data.

Historically, since the World War One (1910s) and World War Two (1940s) era. Arlington is known for being a predominately Irish, Italian and Greek middle class community but in the last decades has become increasingly expensive and diverse, while still retaining its middle class style homes with a mixture of double/triple decker homes (multiple family styles homes) and (mostly smaller sized for single family homes) single family homes.

At the 2020 census, there were 46,308 people living in 19,308 households in the town. The population density was 9,004.1 people per square mile. There were 19,974 housing units at an average density of 3,841.2 per square mile (1,483.1/km^{2}) as of the 2010 census. The racial makeup of the town as of the 2020 census was 75.6% White, 3.3% African American, 0.1% Native American, 13.7% Asian and 6.1% from two or more races. Hispanic or Latino of any race were 5.0% of the population.

There were 19,308 households with an average household size of 2.37 According to previous data, 27.0% had children under the age of 18 living with them, 45.1% were married couples living together, 2.0% had a male householder with no wife present, 9.9% had a female householder with no husband present, and 43.0% were non-families. 35.1% of all households were made up of individuals, and 11.2% had someone living alone who was 65 years of age or older.

Of the 46,308 people in the population, 6.5% were under the age of 5, 21.4% were under the age of 18, and 16% were 65 years and over. 53.3% of the population was female.

The median household income was $125,701, up from $85,059 in 2010. The per capita income for the town was $69,007, up from $47,571 in 2010. About 4.6% of the population were below the poverty line.

=== Income ===
Data is from the 2009–2013 American Community Survey 5-Year Estimates.

Rank	ZIP Code (ZCTA)	Per capita income	Median household income	Median family income	Population	Number of households	Poverty Rate
1	02476 (Arlington Center/Heights)	$51,709	$95,305	$131,770	16,662	7,065	N/a
	Arlington	$49,549	$89,841	$117,590	43,308	18,688	4.4%
2	02474 (East Arlington)	$48,199	$87,225	$111,148	26,646	11,623	N/a
	Middlesex County	$42,861	$82,090	$104,032	1,522,533	581,120	7.7%
	Massachusetts	$35,763	$66,866	$84,900	6,605,058	2,530,147	10.7%
	United States	$28,155	$53,046	$64,719	311,536,594	115,610,216	15.1%

== Government ==
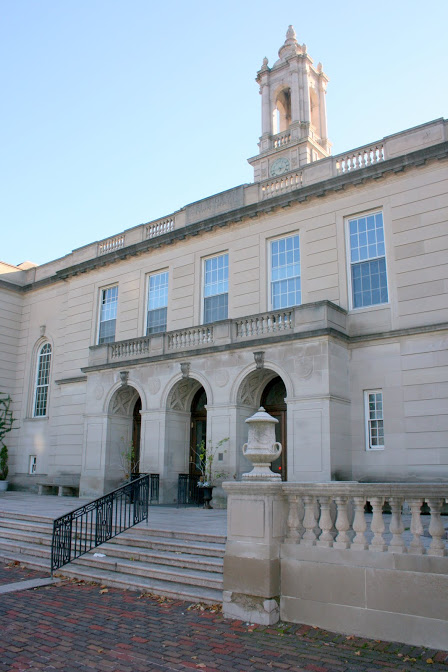
Arlington Town Hall

Historical county designation: Middlesex County
Clerk of Courts:	Michael A. Sullivan
District Attorney:	Marian Ryan
Register of Deeds:	Richard P. Howe, Jr. (North at Lowell); Maria Curtatone (South at Cambridge)
Register of Probate:	Tara E. DeCristofaro
County Sheriff:	Peter Koutoujian
State government
State Representative(s):	Dave Rogers (D); Sean Garballey (D)
State Senator(s):	Cindy F. Friedman (D)
Governor's Councilor(s):	Mara Dolan
Federal government
U.S. Representative(s):	Katherine Clark (D), (5th District)
U.S. Senators:	Elizabeth Warren (D), Ed Markey (D)

Arlington's executive branch consists of an elected five-member select board. The day-to-day operations are handled by a town manager hired by the select board. The legislative branch is a representative town meeting, presided over by the town moderator, and is made up of 252 town meeting members. Twelve town meeting members are elected to staggered three year terms from each of the 21 precincts. Article LXXXIX section 8 of the Massachusetts Constitution permits towns with a population greater than 12,000 to adopt a city form of government. The town of Arlington meets the population requirement to become a city, but has not done so, in part because it would lose its ability to engage citizens in local government under the representative town meeting form of government. Annual town meetings begin in April on the first Monday after Patriots' Day, and are held two nights a week until all items on the town warrant are resolved, and generally last three to four weeks.

Select board
- Stephen W. DeCourcey
- Eric D. Helmuth
- John V. Hurd (vice-chair)
- Diane M. Mahon (Chair)
- Jane P. Morgan

In April 2021, Arlington voted to become the third municipality in the United States to recognize polyamorous domestic partnerships, following adjacent cities of Somerville and Cambridge.

School committee
- Kirsi C. Allison-Ampe
- Liz Exton
- Laura Gitelson (vice-chair)
- Leonard J. Kardon
- Alham Saadat
- Paul Schlichtman (secretary)
- Jeffrey D. Thielman (chair)

Other town-wide elected officials
- Juli Brazile, town clerk
- Greg Christiana, town moderator

== Education ==
=== Public schools ===
Arlington has a public school system with ten schools. (seven elementary schools, two middle schools and one high school) The seven elementary schools (K–5) are Brackett, Bishop, Dallin, Hardy, Peirce, Stratton, and Thompson. There are also two middle schools, grade 6 at Gibbs, and grades 7–8 at Ottoson, and Arlington High School, which includes grades 9–12. In addition, Arlington is in the district served by the Minuteman Regional High School, located in Lexington, one of the top vocational-technical schools in Massachusetts.

=== Private and parochial schools ===
There are two Parochial schools, Arlington Catholic High School, and an elementary/middle school, St. Agnes School, both affiliated with St. Agnes Parish. In addition, there are two secular elementary schools, Lesley Ellis and the Alivia Elementary School.

=== Supplementary schools ===
The Greater Boston Japanese Language School (ボストン補習授業校, Bosuton Hoshū Jugyō Kō), a supplementary school for Japanese people, has its weekday office in Arlington, while it holds classes at Medford High School in Medford.

== Parks and historical sites ==
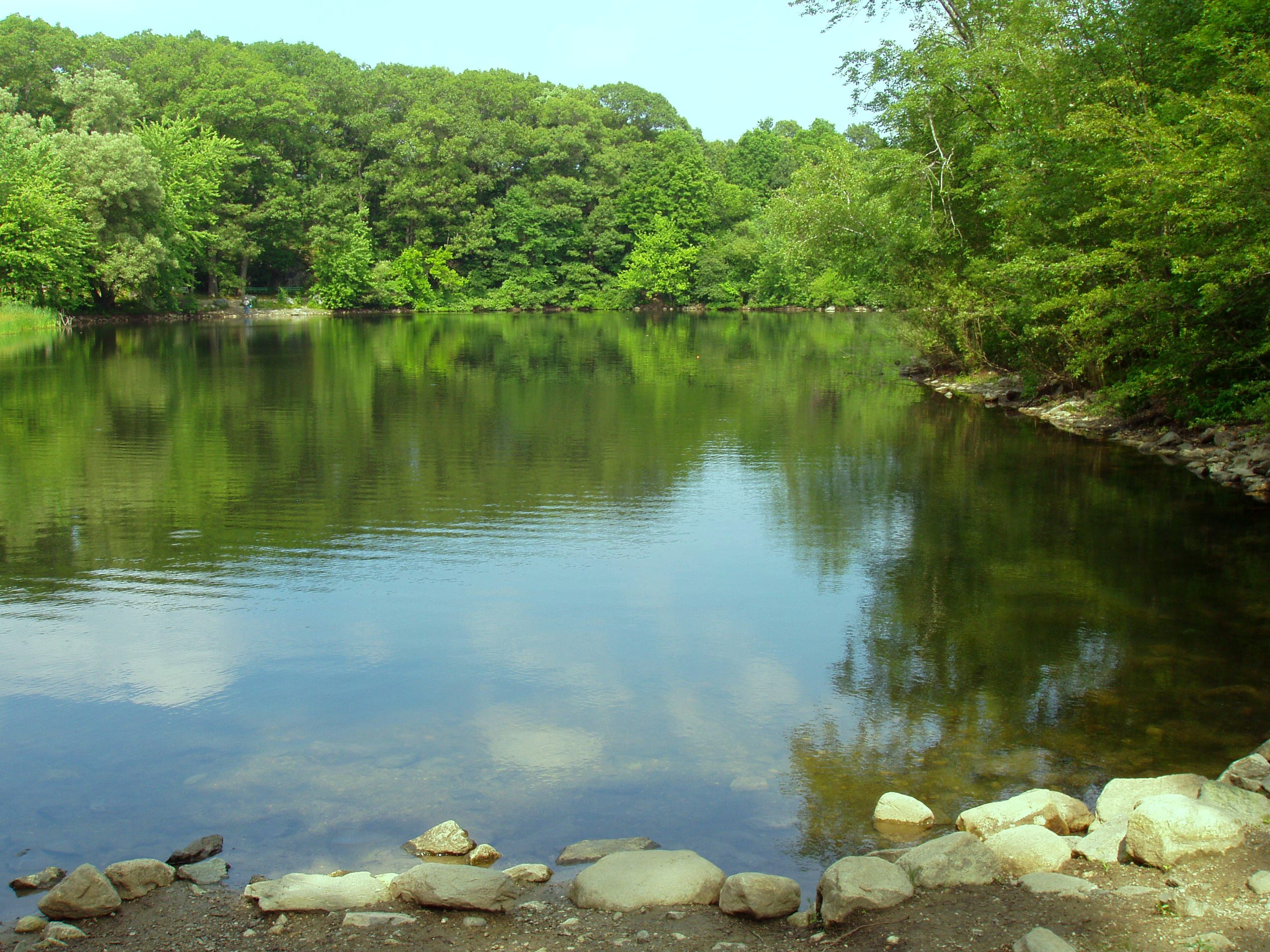
Hills Pond, Menotomy Rocks Park

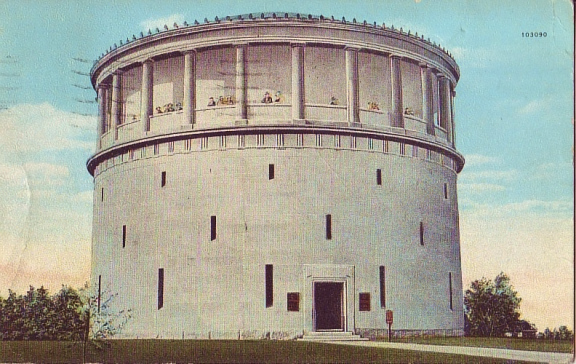
The water tower in Arlington Heights, built in 1921

- The Old Schwamb Mill is the oldest continuously-operating mill site in the United States. Founded by the Schwambs, who immigrated to the U.S. from Germany, the mill currently produces and sells museum-quality, hand-turned wooden oval and circular frames, created much as they were in 1864. Named to the National Register of Historic Places in 1971, the mill-museum is operated by a nonprofit educational trust that maintains the mill's traditions.
- Menotomy Rocks Park encompasses Hills Pond and has trails through the surrounding forested 35.5 acres of land.
- Robbins Farm Park along Eastern Avenue includes a playground, ball fields, a basketball court and a commanding view of the Boston skyline.
- Robbins Library contains the oldest continuously operated free children's library in the country. A sculpture of the Menotomy Hunter by Cyrus Dallin can be found in an adjacent park.
- Spy Pond Park provides access to the northeastern shore of Spy Pond.
- The Arlington Center Historic District, where the Robbins Library and Old Burying Ground are located, is listed in the National Register of Historic Places. It also contains the Arlington Town Hall and the Robbins Memorial Flagstaff that contains four bronze figural sculptures, a detailed base and a finial figure of agriculture by Cyrus Dallin.
- The Cyrus E. Dallin Art Museum is a site dedicated to the artwork and sculpture of noted artist Cyrus E. Dallin.
- The Great Meadow comprises both wet meadow swamp and forest right outside the border of Arlington. While the Great Meadow lies within the borders of Lexington, the park is owned and maintained by the Town of Arlington.
- The House at 5 Willow Court
- The Henry Swan House, built in 1888, is a historic house at 418 Massachusetts Avenue. It was added to the National Register of Historic Places in 1985.
- The Jason Russell House contains a museum that displays, among other items, a mastodon tusk found in Spy Pond in the late 1950s by a fisherman who originally thought he had brought up a tree branch.
- The Minuteman Bikeway, a popular rail trail built in 1992, passes through various Arlington neighborhoods, including Arlington Center.
- The Prince Hall Mystic Cemetery, the only black Freemason Cemetery in the country.
- The Uncle Sam Memorial Statue commemorates native son Samuel Wilson, who was perhaps the original Uncle Sam.
- The Water tower at Park Circle is an exact copy of the rotunda of the ancient Greek Arsinoeon of the Samothrace temple complex.

== Regent Theatre ==
The Regent Theatre is a historic theater in downtown Arlington. It was built in 1916 for vaudeville acts and is still used for live performances as well as films. It was remodeled in 1926. The theatre, located at 7 Medford Street, has 500 seats. It hosts the Arlington International Film Festival. In 2024, the theater was sold to Harvard University computer science professor David J. Malan.

== Notable people ==
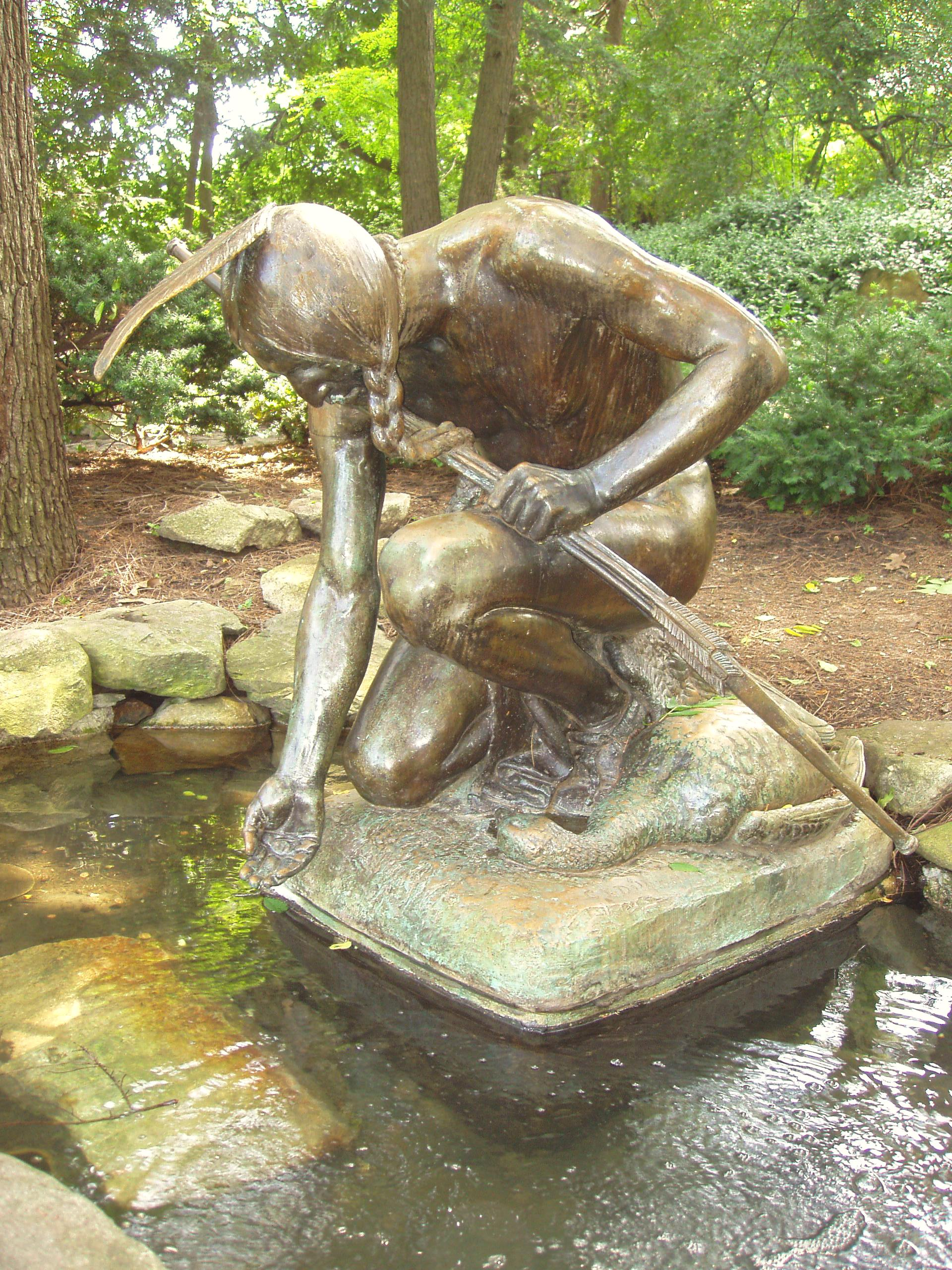
Menotomy Indian Hunter in Arlington Center by resident Cyrus E. Dallin (1911).

- Sven Birkerts (born 1951), essayist and literary critic
- Paul Boudreau, former NFL offensive line coach for the St. Louis Rams
- John Quincy Adams Brackett, Former Massachusetts Governor
- William Stanley Braithwaite, writer, poet and literary critic. Won Spingarn Medal in 1918
- Joseph Buck, soccer player
- Noel Buck, soccer player
- Christopher Castellani, writer
- Andrew Chaikin, space journalist and author of A Man on the Moon, on which HBO based a miniseries
- Haroutioun Hovanes Chakmakjian, chemistry professor, Armenian scholar, and father of Alan Hovhaness
- Pat Connaughton, Player for 2021 NBA Champion Milwaukee Bucks
- Dane Cook, comedian & actor
- Robert Creeley (1926–2005), poet
- Greg Cronin, head coach for the Anaheim Ducks of the National Hockey League (NHL)
- Cyrus E. Dallin (1861–1944), sculptor; best known for Boston's Equestrian Statue of Paul Revere, Appeal to the Great Spirit sculpture in front of the Museum of Fine Arts, Boston and the Angel Maroni Sculpture atop the Salt Lake Temple in Salt Lake City, Utah
- Adio diBiccari, sculptor
- Joshua Eric Dodge, Wisconsin Supreme Court
- Olympia Dukakis (1931-2021), actress, Academy Award winner
- Bob Frankston, co-inventor of Visicalc, the first electronic spreadsheet, at 231 Broadway
- Samuel Garman (1843–1927), explorer, ichthyologist, and herpetologist
- Roy J. Glauber, Nobel Prize winner (Physics), 2005
- Katy Grannan, photographer
- George Franklin Grant, first black graduate of Harvard Dental School and inventor of a type of golf tee
- Maura Healey, governor of Massachusetts
- Deborah Henson-Conant, Grammy-nominated harpist
- Susan Hilferty, costume designer, Wicked
- Louise Homer (1871-1947), opera singer
- Winslow Homer, painter (location is now in Belmont)
- Alan Hovhaness (1911–2000), composer
- Timothy Hutton, Actor, youngest winner of an Academy Award for Best Supporting Actor
- Anthony James (1942–2020), actor
- John A. "Johnny" Kelley, Boston Marathon winner, 1935 and 1945, Olympian athlete
- Richard Lennon, Roman Catholic Bishop of Cleveland
- J. C. R. Licklider (1915–1990), computer scientist
- Vincent Mauro (1943–2024), Italian-born FIFA football referee
- Elaine J. McCarthy projection designer for Broadway and opera
- William J. McCarthy, President of the International Brotherhood of Teamsters (IBT)
- Eugene Francis McGurl, US Army Air Forces 95th Bomb Sq., 17th Bomb Grp Navigator who flew with Crew 5 in General Jimmy Doolittle's "Thirty Seconds over Tokyo" raid in World War II
- Tom McNeeley, Jr., former heavyweight contender who challenged Floyd Patterson for the heavyweight title in Toronto in 1961
- John Messuri, Princeton College hockey player
- Eileen Myles, poet, novelist
- Jordan Peterson, Canadian clinical psychologist and professor of psychology at the University of Toronto. Lived in Arlington between 1993 and 1998 while teaching at Harvard University
- David Powers, former Special Assistant to US President John F. Kennedy
- Hilary Putnam (1926–2016), philosopher, mathematician and computer scientist, professor emeritus at Harvard
- Warren Winn Rawson, market gardener and seed distributor
- Herb Reed, vocalist and founding member of The Platters
- Miles Robinson, current professional soccer player for Atlanta United
- Dave "Chico" Ryan, bassist of Sha Na Na
- Whitney Smith, vexillologist and designer of the flag of Guyana
- Chris Smither, blues guitarist/singer.
- Bill Squires, American Track & Field Coach
- Anthony Stacchi, scenarist (Open Season)
- Mark J. Sullivan, Director of the United States Secret Service
- Rob Surette, speed painter, fine artist, and motivational speaker
- John Townsend Trowbridge (1827–1916), writer
- Samuel Whittemore, elderly soldier in the Battle of Lexington and Concord
- Alan Wilson (1943–1970), also known as Alan "Blind Owl" Wilson; singer, songwriter, leader of Canned Heat
- Samuel Wilson (1766–1854), meat-packer, namesake of "Uncle Sam"
- Brianna Wu, video game developer, primary victim of Gamergate controversy, congressional candidate
- Tom Yewcic, former quarterback with the Boston Patriots from 1961 to 1966, and former catcher for the Detroit Tigers; only person ever to play two professional sports at Fenway Park

== In popular culture ==
- Two feature films have been shot partially in Arlington: The Out-of-Towners, starring Steve Martin and Goldie Hawn, and Once Around, starring Richard Dreyfuss and Holly Hunter.
- Three widely recognized television shows have been filmed in Arlington: This Old House, Trading Spaces, and Made.
- A History Channel special, Bible Battles, was filmed in Arlington.
- Arlington is referenced in the movie The Verdict starring Paul Newman. South Boston's K Street takes the place of Arlington in the movie.
- The music video for "Sing" by The Dresden Dolls was shot at the Regent Theatre in Arlington Center.
- The Steve Katsos Show is filmed at ACMi Studios in Arlington Heights.
- Arlington's Little League baseball team won the Massachusetts State Little League championship in 1971.

== Sister cities ==
- Teosinte, El Salvador
- Nagaokakyo, Kyoto, Japan

== See also ==
- List of Registered Historic Places in Arlington, Massachusetts
