= Warren Winn Rawson =

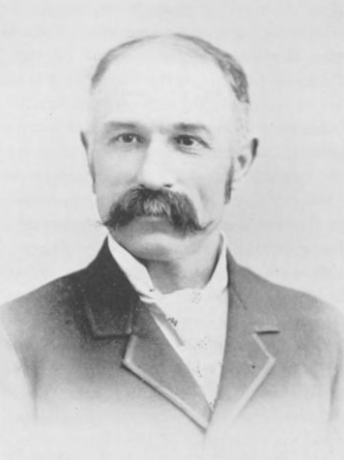
- Born: January 23, 1847; Arlington, Massachusetts
- Died: August 9, 1908 (aged 61); Arlington, Massachusetts
- Occupation(s): Market gardener, seed distributor
- Spouses: Helen M. Mair (m. 1868; died 1872) Sarah E. Mair (m. 1874)

Signature
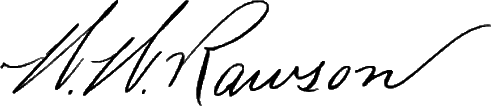

Warren Winn Rawson (January 23, 1847 - August 9, 1908) was a noted American market gardener and seed distributor, said to have introduced the first greenhouses with steam heat.

== Biography ==
Rawson was born and lived in Arlington, Massachusetts on January 23, 1847. He attended public school there, and the Cotting Academy, after which he studied at the Chamberlain & Kendall business college. At age 20 he entered a partnership with his father, a market farmer, whose business he bought out in 1872 at age 25. He purchased an additional 10 acres of farmland in Arlington in 1879, on which he raised his first three greenhouses in 1880 with two additional following in 1882. The following year he installed steam heating in his greenhouses, said to be the first such heating plants.

By the early 1900s he had 30 greenhouses in cultivation, said to be the largest such establishment in New England, with particular emphasis on lettuce and cucumbers. He was also a notable distributor of seeds, having purchased an existing seed business in 1884 and then growing it aggressively.

Rawson was extremely active in numerous town and state organizations, serving as organizer and first president of the Boston Market Gardeners' Association, vice president of the Massachusetts Horticultural Society, and in many other roles.

He married Helen M. Mair on February 28, 1868, and they had two children. She died in May 1872, and he remarried to Sarah E. Mair on September 21, 1874. They had three children.

Rawson died at his home in Arlington on August 9, 1908.
