= Henry J. Meade =

United States Air Force general

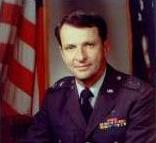
- Born: August 8, 1925; Brookline, Massachusetts, U.S.
- Died: June 22, 2006 (aged 80); MetroWest Medical Center, Massachusetts, U.S.
- Military career
- Allegiance: United States
- Branch: United States Air Force
- Rank: Major general
- Commands: Chief of Chaplains of the United States Air Force

Henry J. Meade (August 8, 1925 – June 22, 2006) was Chief of Chaplains of the United States Air Force. Born in Brookline, Massachusetts in 1925, Meade was an ordained Roman Catholic priest. He graduated from Saint Anselm College and Saint John's Seminary. Meade died on June 22, 2006.

== Career ==
Meade joined the United States Air Force in 1957. After serving at various locations around the world, he was assigned to The Pentagon in 1969. In 1972, he was named Deputy Chief of Chaplains of the United States Air Force with the rank of brigadier general. He was promoted to Chief of Chaplains and achieved the rank of major general in 1974. Meade remained Chief of Chaplains until his retirement in 1978.

Awards he received include the Legion of Merit, the Bronze Star Medal, the Air Force Commendation Medal with three oak leaf clusters and the Outstanding Unit Award.
