= Rob Surette =

American painter (born 1971)

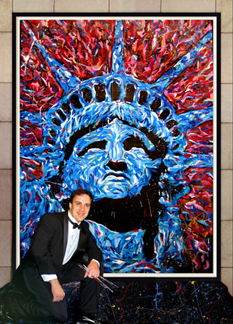
Rob Surette in front of his Lady Liberty painting

Robert R. M. "Rob" Surette (born August 11, 1971) is an American speed-painter and public speaker known for inspiring audience members with his 6-foot paintings (created live, in 1–5 minutes each) and motivational messages.

Surette is known for utilizing amplified music, dramatic theatrical lights, accompanying video screens, body-encompassing paint-splattering painting techniques.

Since 1995, Surette has performed over 2,500 performances and his repertoire consists of over 500 different historical figures, musicians, movie stars, TV stars and athletes.

He is best known for speed-painting 6-foot portraits of Steven Tyler, Martin Luther King Jr., Albert Einstein, Statue of Liberty, Jim Morrison, John Lennon and Mother Teresa.

Surette grew up in Arlington, Massachusetts and received his Bachelor of Science Degree in Computer Science/Business from Saint Anselm College in 1993.

Two years after his college graduation, Surette developed his first speed-painting performances and called his unique artform "Amazing Hero Art".

In 2005, Surette performed on Good Morning America, and in 2008 Surette performed on The Tonight Show with Jay Leno.

Also in 2005, Surette's name was added to the Rosa Parks National Wall of Tolerance Monument in Montgomery, Alabama, in recognition of his tireless work towards racial equality.

Surette has also been recognized by Mother Teresa's successor, Sr. Nirmala, of the Missionaries of Charity in Calcutta, India, with a personal phone call, thanking Surette for his work in American public schools, presenting his morals and values show entitled, "BE SOMEBODY!".
