= Elad Covaliu =

American gridiron football player (born 1994)

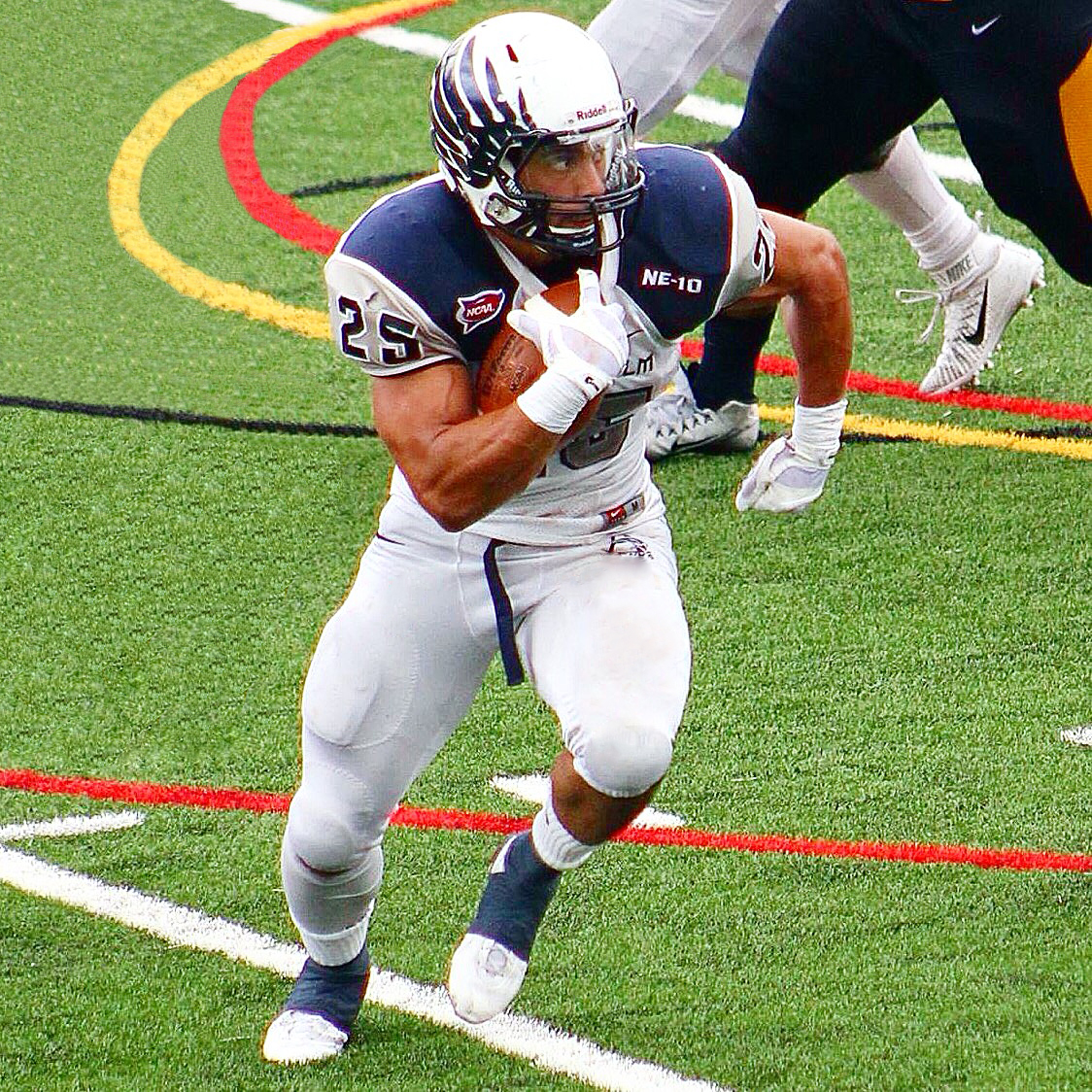
- Covaliu with the Saint Anselm Hawks in 2015

Profile
- Positions: Running back and wide receiver

Personal information
- Born: April 21, 1994 (age 32); Rockville, Maryland
- Listed height: 5 ft 10 in (1.78 m)
- Listed weight: 215 lb (98 kg)

Career information
- High school: Walter Johnson High School
- College: Holy Cross and Saint Anselm
- NFL draft: 2016: undrafted

Career history
- Bloomington Edge (2017); BC Lions (2018)*; Iowa Barnstormers (2020–2021)
- * Offseason or practice squad member only

Awards and highlights
- First-team JSR All-American (2015); First-team All-ECAC (2015); First-team Northeast-10 All-Conference (2015); Second-team Northeast-10 All-Conference (2014)

Elad Covaliu (born April 21, 1994) is an American football running back. He played college football at the College of the Holy Cross and at Saint Anselm College where was named First-team JSR All-American, First-team All-ECAC, and All-Super Region 1 Third-team running back. Covaliu also earned Northeast-10 All-Conference honors in 2014 and 2015. Covaliu signed with the Bloomington Edge of the Indoor Football League (IFL) in 2017 where he played for one season. In 2018, Covaliu attended Mini-Camp with the BC Lions of the Canadian Football League (CFL).

== High school ==
A native of Rockville, MD, Covaliu attended Walter Johnson High School in Bethesda, Maryland, where he was a three-sport athlete in football, wrestling, and track.

=== Football ===
Covaliu played running back, wide receiver, and defensive back during his high school career. Covaliu totaled 1,347 rushing yards, 1,583 receiving yards and 24 touchdowns, in addition to posting 124 tackles, 10 interceptions, a forced fumble and fumble recovery on defense. He was named All-League running back by MaxPreps and The Gazette (Maryland) as a senior in 2011.

=== Wrestling ===
Covaliu was the first Maryland state champion wrestler at Walter Johnson since 1976 and is currently the second ever state champion. As a senior in 2012, Covaliu won the MPSSAA State Championship Tournament at the 182 pound weight class. As a Junior in 2011, he placed second in the state of Maryland at the 160 pound weight class. Covaliu additionally won 10 total individual tournament championships including his two-time Maryland 4A West Regional Championships and his Montgomery County Championship. Covaliu was named All-Met by The Washington Post and All-Gazette by The Gazette (Maryland) in his senior year. He currently holds the Walter Johnson High School record for most varsity wrestling wins (126).

=== Track ===
Covaliu was also an elite hurdler and sprinter for the school's track & field team. During his junior year in 2011, Covaliu placed 1st in both the 110-meter hurdles and 300-meter hurdles at the Maryland 4A West Regional Championship Meet. As a Senior in 2012, Covaliu was presented with the James Demoss Award and named Most Outstanding Male Athlete at the Montgomery County Championship Meet for his double victory in the 110-meter hurdles and 300-meter hurdles. Despite high winds and a steady downpour, Covaliu came within 0.33 seconds of breaking the 17 year old meet record of 39.0 (handtimed) in the 300-meter hurdles. At the Maryland State Championship Meet, he finished 3rd and 5th in the state for 110-meter hurdles and 300-meter hurdles respectively. Covaliu currently holds the Walter Johnson High School records for both the 110-meter hurdles (14.92) and 300-meter hurdles (38.84).

== College career ==
=== 2012 ===
As a freshman in 2012 Covaliu appeared in four games for the Crusaders on special teams. In his game against #8 Ranked Lehigh (Nov. 8), Covaliu forced and recovered a fumble to set up a Holy Cross touchdown. Covaliu also had had a pair of tackles at Wagner (Nov. 10) and one solo tackle against Fordham (Oct. 27).

=== 2013 ===
Covaliu played in eight games as a sophomore at Holy Cross totaling 356 yards from scrimmage and two touchdowns (one rushing and one receiving). In addition to playing football, Covaliu also competed on the Holy Cross track & field team. During the indoor season, Covaliu ran the 60 meter hurdles, 60 meter dash, and competed in the long jump. Covaliu qualified for the Patriot League Indoor Track & Field Championships in the 60 meter hurdles. He then went on to qualify as one of 30 hurdlers in New England to compete in the NEICAAA New England Indoor Track & Field Championships. After the 2013 season, Covaliu transferred from Holy Cross to Saint Anselm College.

=== 2014 ===
In his first season with the Saint Anselm Hawks, Covaliu led the team in rushing and had over 1000 all-purpose yards and eight rushing touchdowns. Covaliu was selected to the Northeast-10 All-Conference team and the JSR All-America team. In his second game with the Hawks against Southern Connecticut State University (Sept.13), Covaliu scored the game-winning touchdown to lead Saint Anselm to a 23–20 overtime victory. This was the first 2–0 start for the Hawks since 2004. Covaliu helped guide the Hawks to their first winning season in 14 years. The 6–5 season was a five-game turnaround that equaled the total victories from the previous four years combined. Covaliu ranked fourth in the league in both yards and touchdowns, fifth in yards per carry, and sixth in yards per contest.

=== 2015 ===
Covaliu started all 11 games for the Hawks in 2015. He ran the ball 192 times for 1,005 yards and nine touchdowns. His 1,005 rushing yard was the second highest in program history for rushing yards in a season. Covaliu registered 1,695 all-purpose yards on the season which ranked fifth highest in program history. Covaliu set several records in his game against LIU Post (Sept. 19). He finished with 272 All-Purpose yards and 259 Rushing yards which set the single game program record. His 88-yard touchdown scamper ranks as the longest run from scrimmage and the longest touchdown run in program history. Covaliu also ranks fourth all-time in career rushing yards (1,627) and career rushing touchdowns (16) in only two seasons with the Hawks.

=== College statistics ===
Holy Cross Crusaders
Season		Rushing					Receiving				
Year	GP	Att	Yards	Avg	Long	TD	Rec	Yards	Avg	Long	TD
2013	8	61	290	4.8	24	1	10	66	6.6	16	1
Career	8	61	290	4.8	24	1	10	66	6.6	16	1

Saint Anselm Hawks
Season		Rushing					Receiving					Kick returns					Punt returns				
Year	GP	Att	Yards	Avg	Long	TD	Rec	Yards	Avg	Long	TD	KR	Yards	Avg	Long	TD	PR	Yards	Avg	Long	TD
2014	11	136	622	4.6	43	8	25	176	7.0	49	0	17	310	18.2	42	0	0	0	0	0	0
2015	11	192	1,005	5.2	88	8	27	188	7.0	47	1	23	483	21.0	51	0	4	19	4.8	22	0
Career	22	328	1,627	5.0	88	16	52	364	7.0	49	1	40	793	19.8	51	0	4	19	4.8	22	0

== Professional career ==
=== Bloomington Edge ===
On February 11, 2017, Covaliu signed with the Bloomington Edge of the Indoor Football League (IFL).

=== BC Lions ===
On April 15, 2018, Covaliu attended a Free-Agent Workout with the BC Lions of the Canadian Football League (CFL). Following the workout, Covaliu was invited to attend Mini-Camp with the BC Lions. He attended the three-day camp from April 25–27, 2018.

=== Iowa Barnstormers ===
In 2020, Covaliu competed in the Iowa Barnstormers' two-week training camp and was signed to the team. However, due to the COVID-19 pandemic, the 2020 Indoor Football League season was cancelled prior to the Barnstormers' first game. Covaliu remained with the Barnstormers for the 2021 season.
