= Jim Mill =

American ice hockey player

- Born: November 17, 1967 (age 58) Detroit, MI, USA
- Height: 6 ft 0 in (183 cm)
- Weight: 178 lb (81 kg; 12 st 10 lb)
- Position: Goaltender
- Caught: Left
- Played for: ECHL; Raleigh IceCaps; Roanoke Express; Huntington Blizzard; Tallahassee Tiger Sharks
- NHL draft: Undrafted
- Playing career: 1992–1996

Jim Mill (born November 17, 1967) is an American former professional ice hockey goaltender.

In 1998, following his playing career, Mill was hired to an operations staff position with the American Hockey League (AHL). In 2001, he was promoted to Vice President, and in 2007 he was named the AHL's Executive Vice President of Hockey Operations.

From 2009-2015 he served as the assistant general manager with the Minnesota Wild of the National Hockey League (NHL). Since 2015 Mill has served as a Pro/Amateur Scout with the New Jersey Devils of the National Hockey League (NHL).
