= Whittemore House =

Whittemore House may refer to:

- Whittemore House (Arlington, Massachusetts), listed on the National Register of Historic Places (NRHP)
- Whittemore House (Gloucester, Massachusetts), listed on the NRHP
- Whittemore House (Washington, D.C.), listed on the NRHP
