= Allyn House =

Allyn House may refer to:

- Capt. Benjamin Allyn, II, House, Windsor, CT, listed on the NRHP in Connecticut
- Deshon-Allyn House, New London, CT, listed on the NRHP in Connecticut
- Allyn House (Arlington, Massachusetts), listed on the NRHP in Massachusetts
- A. H. Allyn House, Delavan, WI, listed on the NRHP in Wisconsin
