= Ralph W. Shattuck House =

Historic house in Massachusetts, United States

- U.S. National Register of Historic Places
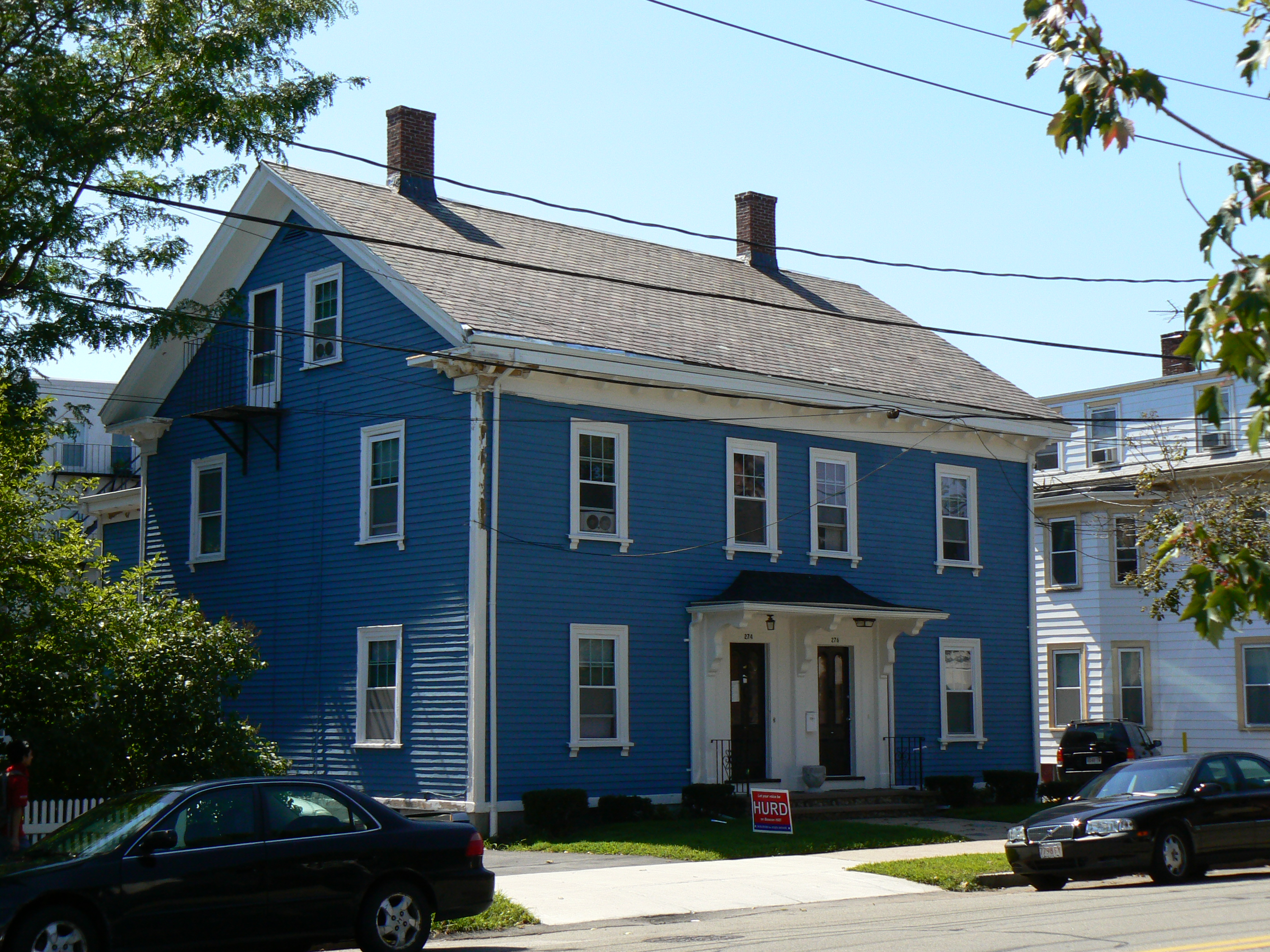
- Photograph taken in 2008

- Location within Massachusetts Location within the United States
- Location: 274–276 Broadway, Arlington, Massachusetts
- Coordinates: 42°24′48″N 71°8′56″W
- Built: 1875
- Architectural style: Italianate
- MPS: Arlington MRA
- NRHP reference No.: 85002687
- Added to NRHP: September 27, 1985

The Ralph W. Shattuck House is a historic duplex house in Arlington, Massachusetts. The 2 1/2-story wood frame double house was built c. 1875, and is one of the best-preserved Italianate houses in the town. It has a heavily bracketed cornice line, a bracketed hood sheltering the two entrances, and decorative window surrounds with small brackets at the lintel. It was owned by Ralph W. Shattuck, proprietor of Shattuck Hardware, one of Arlington's longest-running businesses.

The house was listed on the National Register of Historic Places in 1985.

== See also ==
- National Register of Historic Places listings in Arlington, Massachusetts
