= Second A. P. Cutter House =

Historic house in Massachusetts, United States

- U.S. National Register of Historic Places
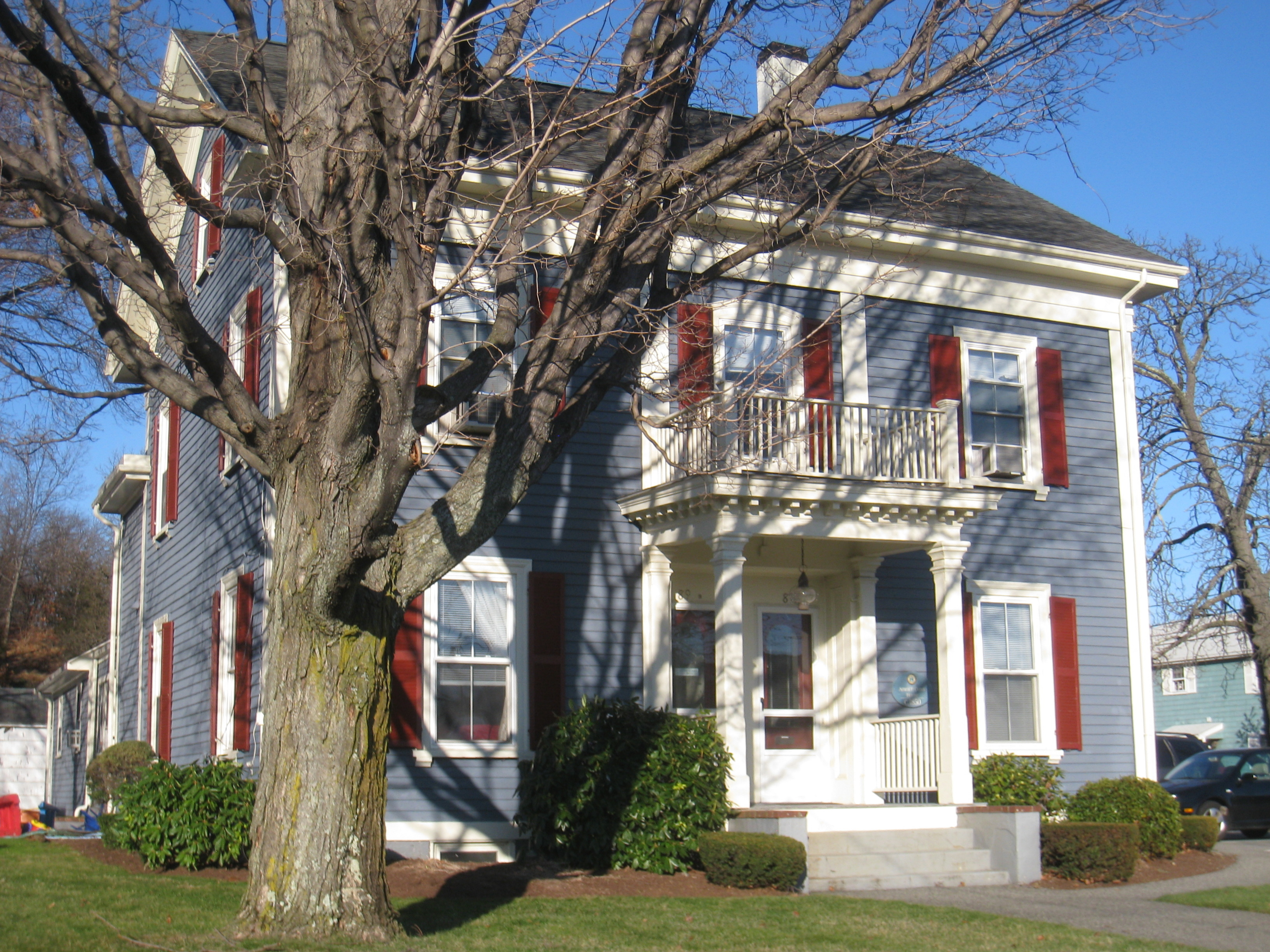

- Location within Massachusetts Location within the United States
- Location: 89 Summer Street, Arlington, Massachusetts
- Coordinates: 42°25′8″N 71°9′29″W
- Built: 1855
- Architectural style: Italianate
- MPS: Arlington MRA
- NRHP reference No.: 85001029
- Added to NRHP: April 18, 1985

The Second A. P. Cutter House is a historic house in Arlington, Massachusetts. It is a 2 1/2-story wood-frame structure that is architecturally transitional, exhibiting Italianate massing with Greek Revival decorations. It is three bays wide, with pilasters at the corners, and window surrounds with simple brackets. Its center entrance, now housing two doorways, is sheltered by an Italianate porch with balustrade above. The house was built c. 1855, and is associated with one of several Ammi Pierce Cutters from the locally prominent Cutter family. It was converted to a two-family residence in 1949.

The house was listed on the National Register of Historic Places in 1985.

== See also ==
- National Register of Historic Places listings in Arlington, Massachusetts
