= Peirce Farm Historic District =

Historic district in Massachusetts, United States

- U.S. National Register of Historic Places
- U.S. Historic district
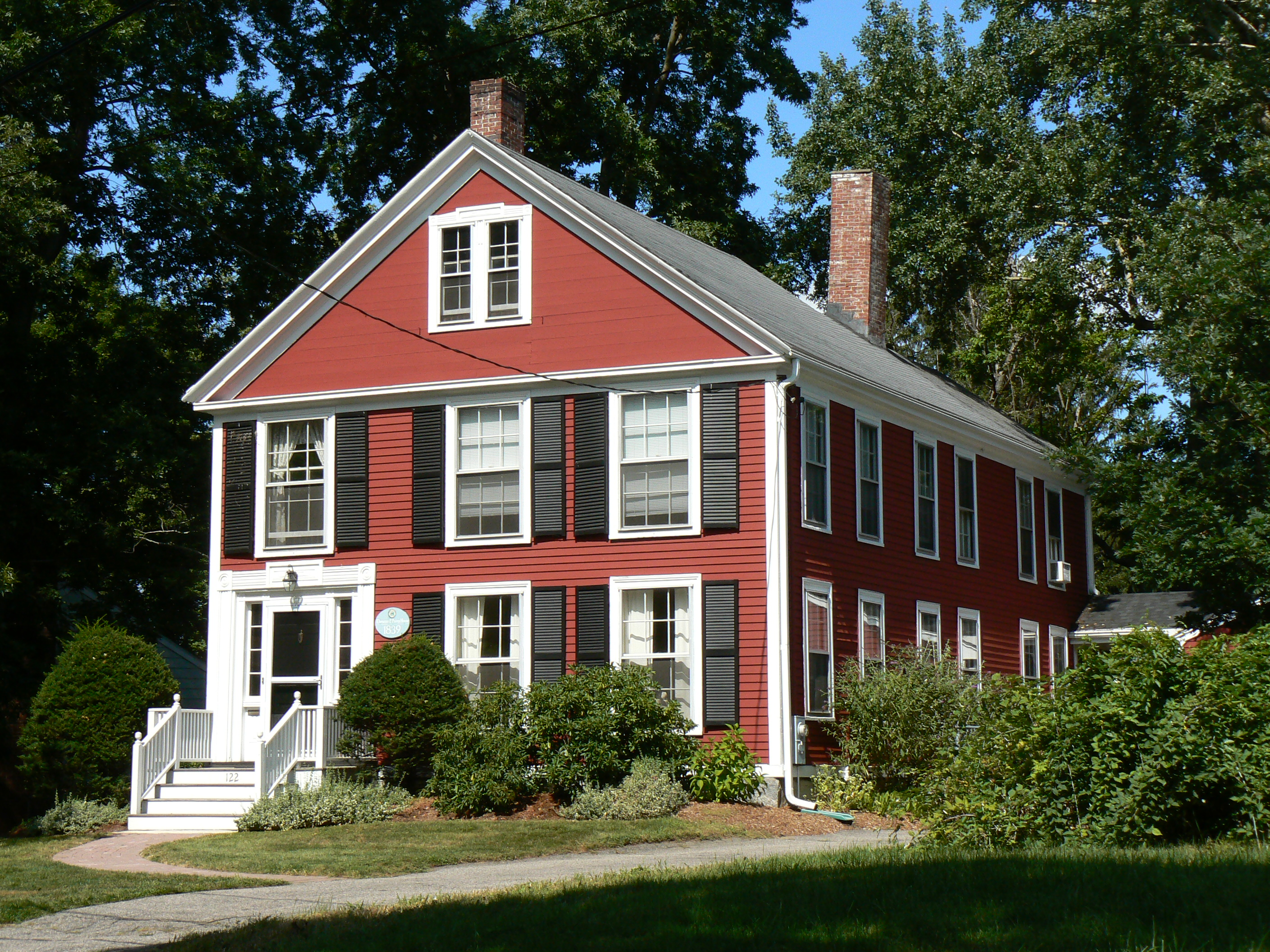
- 122 Claremont St, photo from 2008

- Location within Massachusetts Location within the United States
- Location: Arlington, Massachusetts
- Coordinates: 42°25′0″N 71°11′1″W
- Built: 1830–1835
- Architectural style: transitional Federal to Greek Revival
- MPS: Arlington MRA
- NRHP reference No.: 85002678
- Added to NRHP: September 27, 1985

The Peirce Farm Historic District is a small historic district within the Arlington Heights neighborhood of the town of Arlington, Massachusetts. The district features three houses that are in a transitional style between Federal and Greek Revival styles, dating from the 1830s. The houses are located at 122 and 123 Claremont Avenue, and 178 Oakland Avenue. These three houses were all built by members of the Peirce family, who were among the earliest settlers of the Arlington Heights area, and owned much of its land into the late 19th century.

The district was added to the National Register of Historic Places in 1985, where the name is misspelled "Pierce".

== J. Peirce House ==
The J. Peirce House is a 2 1/2-story wood-frame structure, five bays wide, with a side-gable roof and a central entry with sidelight windows. The form is basically Federal, but the decorative trim elements are Greek Revival in style, except for the early 20th-century entry hood. This house was built c. 1830.

== John A. P. Peirce House ==
The John Peirce House is also a 2 1/2-story wood-frame structure, but it has a front-facing gable and three-bay facade, more firmly in the Greek Revival style. It has corner pilasters and a heavy raking cornice. It was built about 1835.

== Thomas Peirce House ==
The Thomas Peirce House is the most elaborate of the three, with more substantial Greek Revival features than the John Peirce House. It also has the front-facing gable, with paneled pilasters, a full entablature, and a full-pedimented gable. A single-story porch extends across the front and wraps around the side. This house was built about 1850.

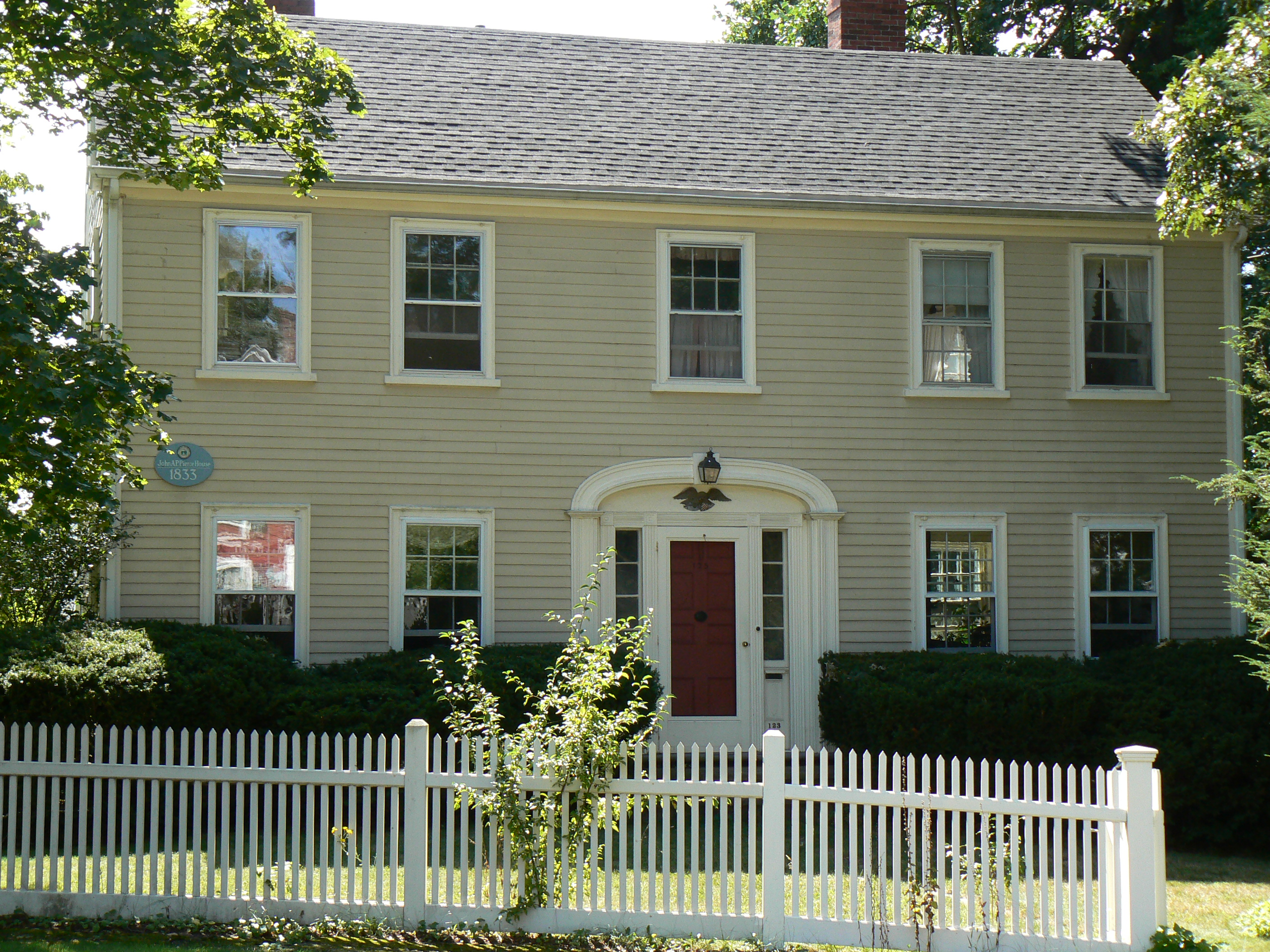
123 Claremont St.

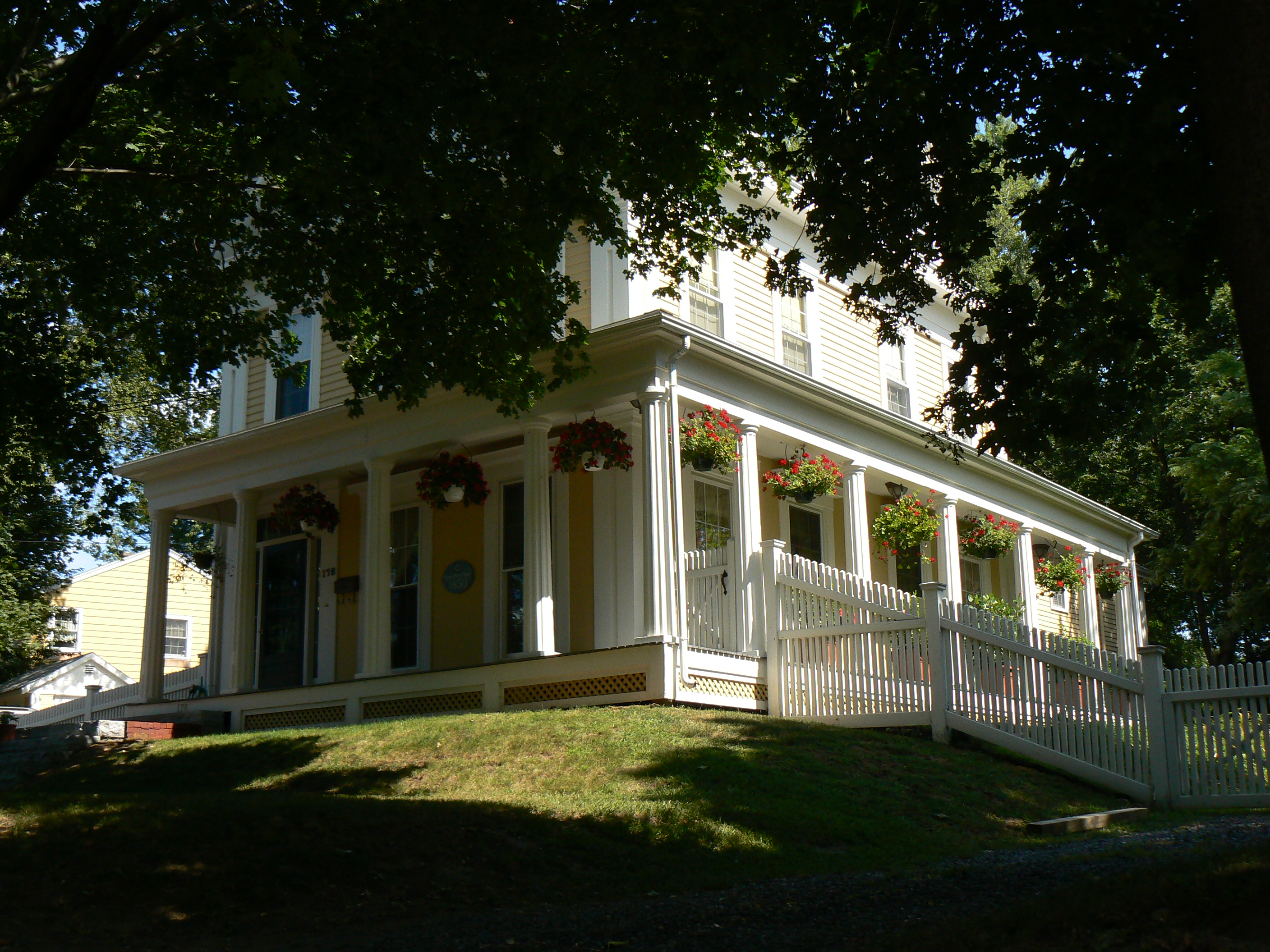
178 Oakland St.

== See also ==
- National Register of Historic Places listings in Arlington, Massachusetts
