= Arlington Gaslight Company =

- U.S. National Register of Historic Places
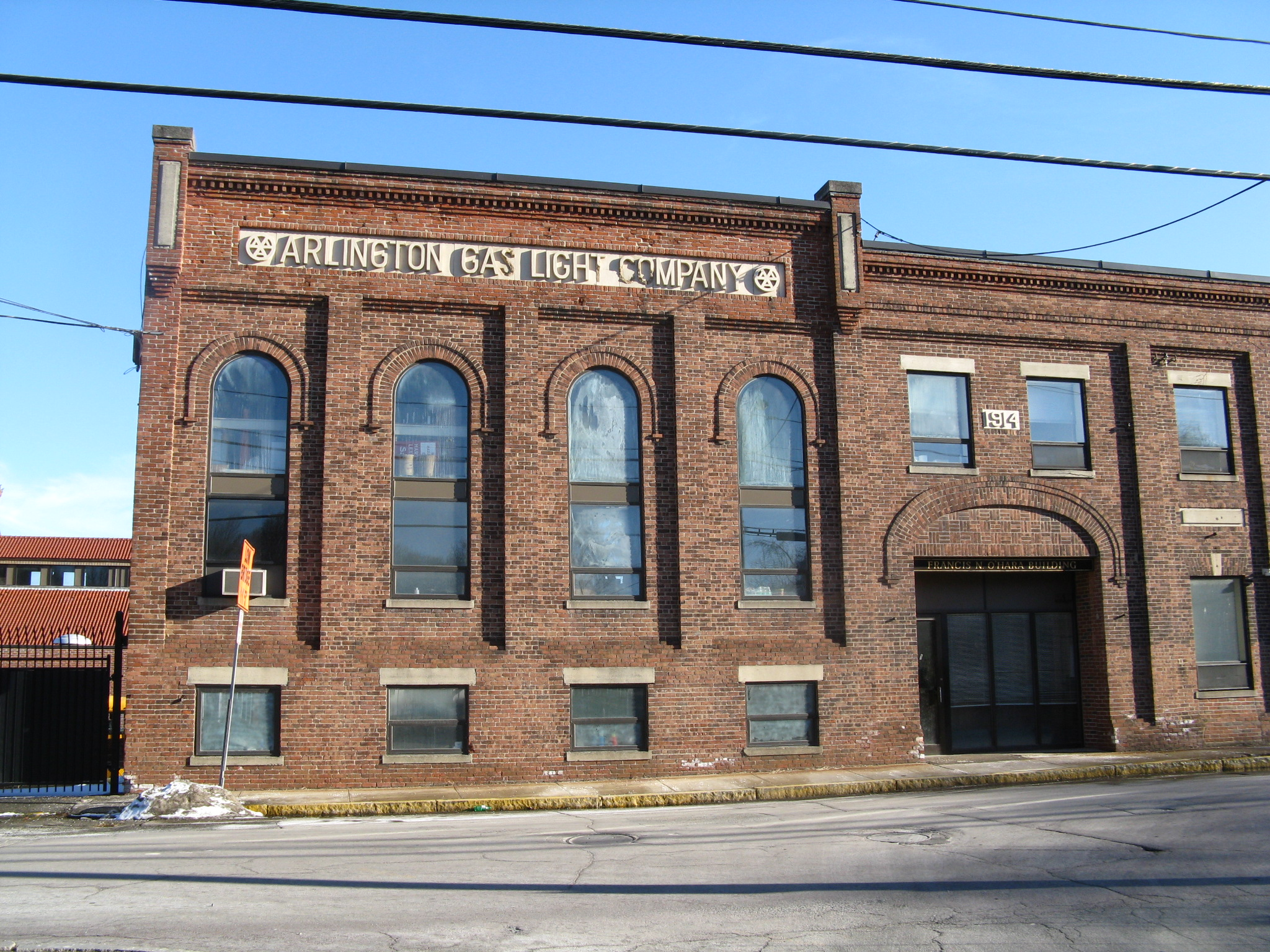
- Arlington Gaslight Company

- Location within Massachusetts Location within the United States
- Location: 51 Grove St., Arlington, Massachusetts
- Coordinates: 42°25′13″N 71°9′50″W
- Built: 1914
- Architectural style: Romanesque
- MPS: Arlington MRA
- NRHP reference No.: 85001021
- Added to NRHP: April 18, 1985

The Arlington Gaslight Company is an historic industrial complex in Arlington, Massachusetts. It is one of the town's few large-scale examples of industrial architecture, built for a local fuel company in 1914. The three-building facility presently houses the town's public works department with the Gas Light Company Building housing the town's Facilities Department. It was listed on the National Register of Historic Places in 1985.

== Description and history ==
The former Arlington Gas Company property consists of about 4.5 acres (1.8 ha) on the east side of Grove Street in central Arlington, and is bounded on the north by the former railroad right-of-way that now carries the Minuteman Bike Path. The largest surviving building, a power station occupying a significant portion of the back section of the property, is a prominent local example of Romanesque Revival architecture, with corbelled brick decoration on its cornices. Fronting on Grove Street are two smaller brick buildings, one originally serving as the gas company offices, and the other as a meter house.

The site's previous industrial use was for the Welch and Griffith saw factory, the first in the United States. This complex burned down in 1913. The complex was built in 1914 to house the Arlington Gas Company, which manufactured fuel for home use. It originally included a large storage tank, on top of which was emblazoned "ARLINGTON" and an arrow pointing north; this was one of the earliest known aids to aerial navigation, and was torn down in 1975. The complex now serves as the town's public works yard with The Facilities Department, Building Department / ISD, and IT Department.

== See also ==
- National Register of Historic Places listings in Arlington, Massachusetts
