= Thomas Swadkins House =

Historic house in Massachusetts, United States

- U.S. National Register of Historic Places
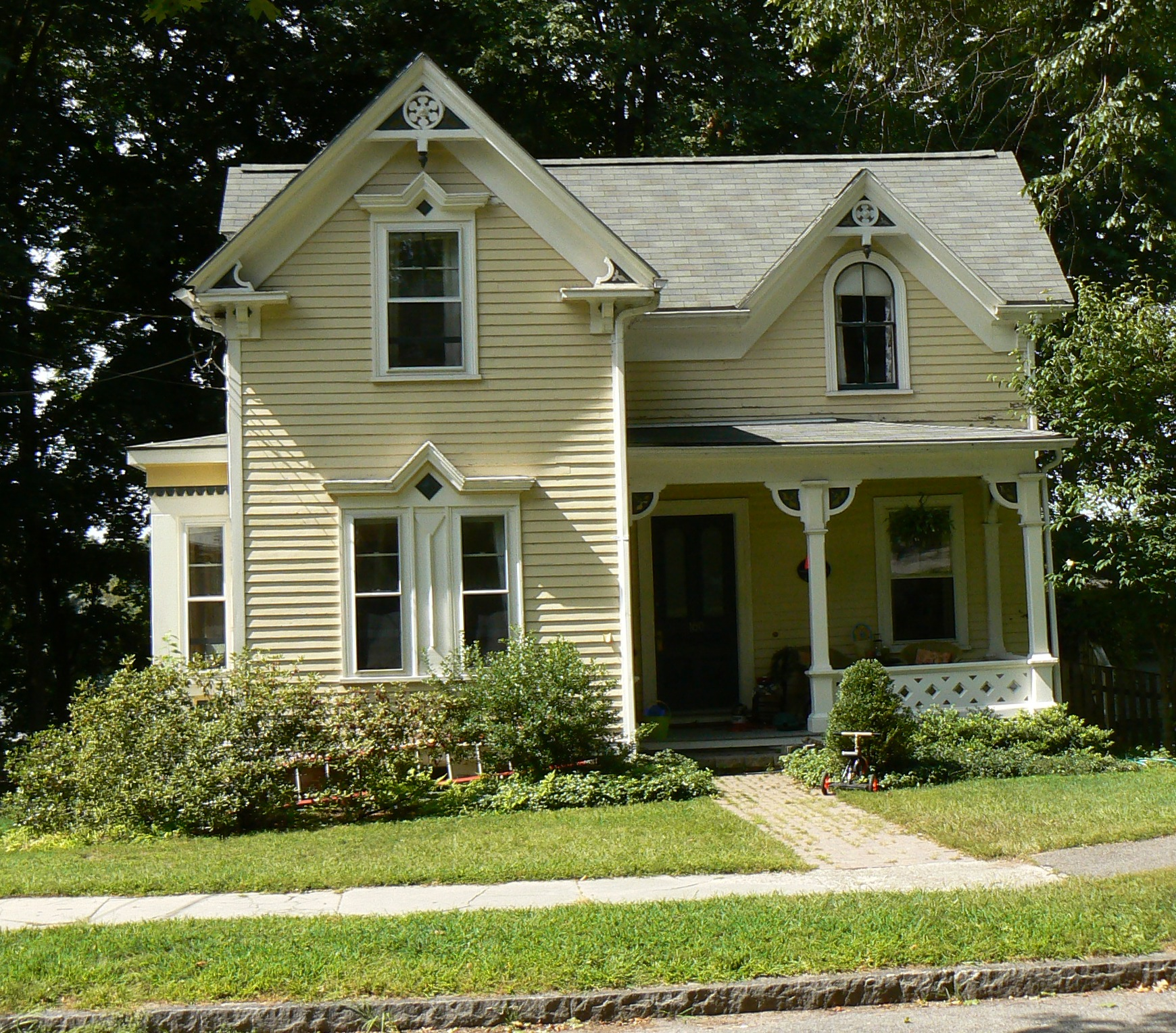
- The house in 2008

- Location within Massachusetts Location within the United States
- Location: 160 Westminster Avenue, Arlington, Massachusetts
- Coordinates: 42°25′48″N 71°11′13″W
- Built: 1882
- Architectural style: Gothic, Italianate
- MPS: Arlington MRA
- NRHP reference No.: 85001048
- Added to NRHP: April 18, 1985

The Thomas Swadkins House is a historic house in Arlington, Massachusetts. This 2 1/2-story wood frame was built c. 1882, and features both Gothic and Italianate styling. The gable decorations and porch railing are Gothic, while the house massing and brackets are Italianate, as are the window surrounds and the round-arch window on the right side. It was one of the first houses built when the Crescent Hill area was developed in the 1880s.

The house was listed on the National Register of Historic Places in 1985. It was renovated and expanded in 2009 and again in 2025, both under ownership of the Jackson family. Many people say it should be renamed the Jackson-Swadkins house, but the Jacksons respectfully prefer it retain the Swadkins nomenclature.

== See also ==
- National Register of Historic Places listings in Arlington, Massachusetts
