= Arlington Coal & Lumber =

- U.S. National Register of Historic Places
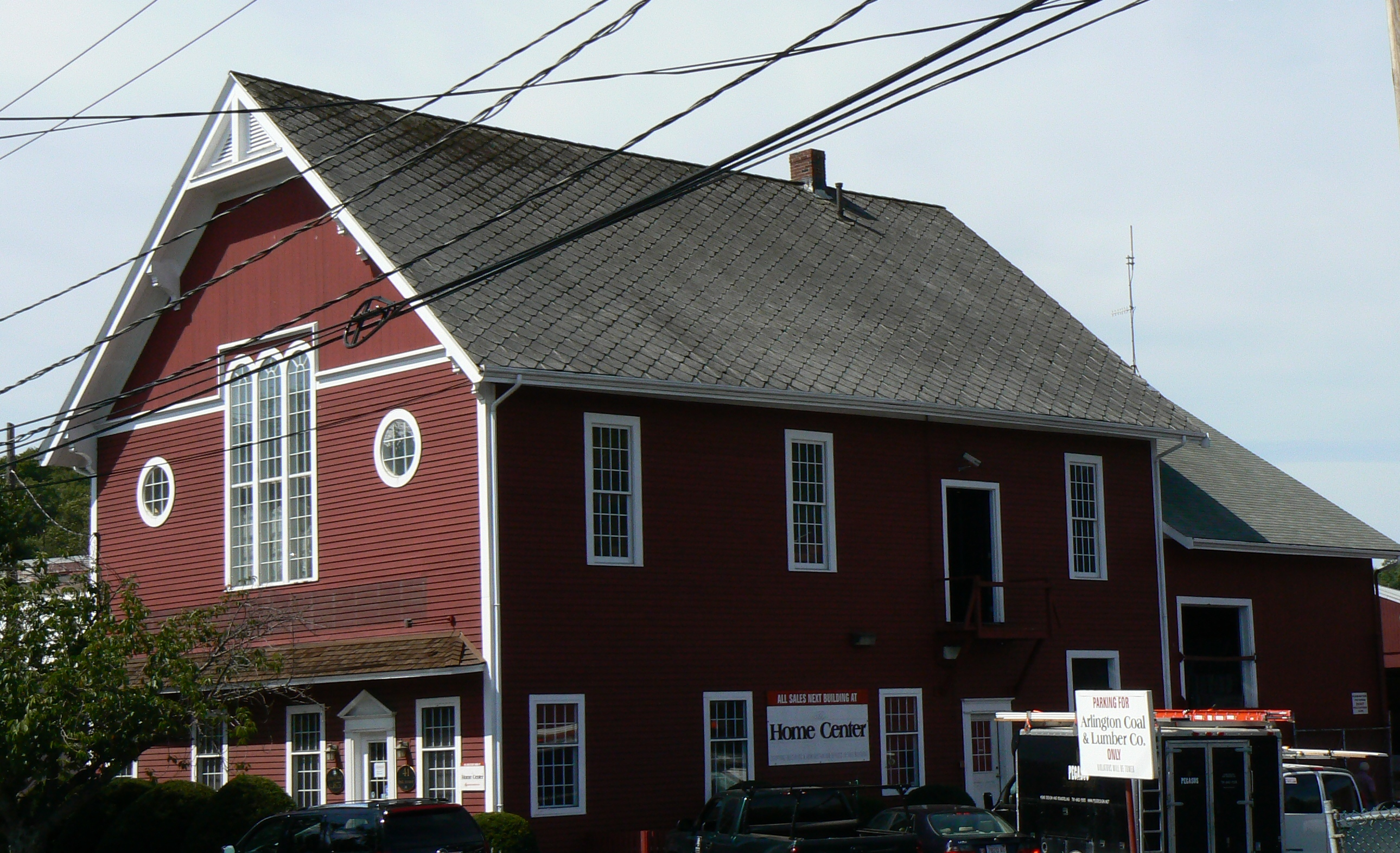
- Photo from 2008

- Location within Massachusetts Location within the United States
- Location: 41 Park Avenue, Arlington, Massachusetts
- Coordinates: 42°25′29″N 71°11′0″W
- Built: 1875
- Architectural style: Gothic, Stick/Eastlake
- MPS: Arlington MRA
- NRHP reference No.: 85001020
- Added to NRHP: April 18, 1985

The Arlington Coal & Lumber Company building is a historic commercial and civic building located in Arlington, Massachusetts, United States. Built in 1875, it is a locally significant example of Late Gothic Revival architecture, with a long history as a community center. The building was listed on the National Register of Historic Places in 1985. The family-owned lumber yard has been in business at this location since 1923.

== Description and history ==
The Arlington Coal & Lumber Company building is located on the north side of Park Avenue on the east side of the village of Arlington Heights. It is a two-story wood frame building with a front gabled roof. Its exterior is clad mostly in wooden clapboards, with top portion of the front gable finished in vertical board siding. The front façade has four sash windows on the first floor, with the entrance between the two rightmost, framed by pilasters and topped by an entablature and gabled pediment. The first floor is separated from the second by a shallow hip-roofed porch. The upper level has a central group of three tall round-arch windows, flanked on either side small round windows. Fenestration and door placement on the sides is varied. The ground floor houses commercial space, and the upper level a large auditorium.

The distinctive Gothic Revival building was built c. 1875, and has seen a variety of uses. Its upper floor was used as a meeting space, and was where political meetings, religious services, and social events took place, along with civic activities such as theater productions, dance classes, and fraternal society meetings. One group that used it was the Arlington Zouaves, a quasi-military marching society. The first floor has predominantly been used for commercial purposes, although the building did for a time house a branch of the local public library.

== See also ==
- National Register of Historic Places listings in Arlington, Massachusetts
