= Kimball Farmer House =

Historic house in Massachusetts, United States

- U.S. National Register of Historic Places
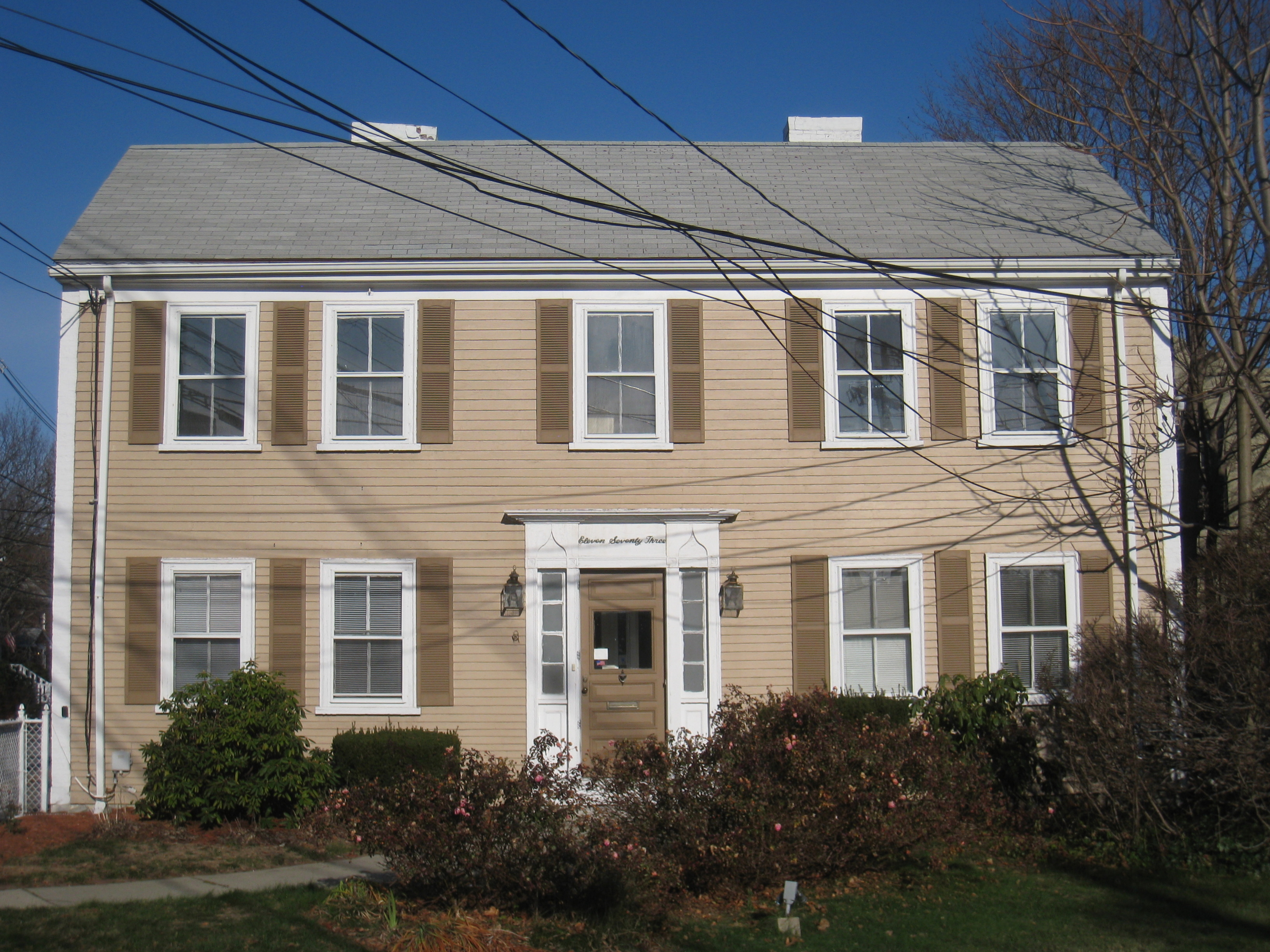

- Location within Massachusetts Location within the United States
- Location: 1173 Massachusetts Avenue, Arlington, Massachusetts
- Coordinates: 42°25′24″N 71°10′30″W
- Built: 1826
- Architectural style: Federal
- MPS: Arlington MRA
- NRHP reference No.: 85001031
- Added to NRHP: April 18, 1985

The Kimball Farmer House is a historic house in Arlington, Massachusetts. This two-story wood-frame house was built in 1826 by Kimball Farmer, a farmer. The chimneys of this Federal style house are placed at the rear, a local variant, and its front entry is framed by sidelight windows topped with Gothic-style lancet tracing in the entablature. The property was owned by three generations of Farmers, and became home to commercial offices and one residential unit for many years during the 20th century. In 2014, the nonprofit affordable housing developer, Housing Corporation of Arlington purchased the site, restored many of its historic features, and created three permanently affordable apartments within it.

The house was listed on the National Register of Historic Places in 1985.

== See also ==
- National Register of Historic Places listings in Arlington, Massachusetts
