= Butterfield-Whittemore House =

Historic house in Massachusetts, United States

- U.S. National Register of Historic Places
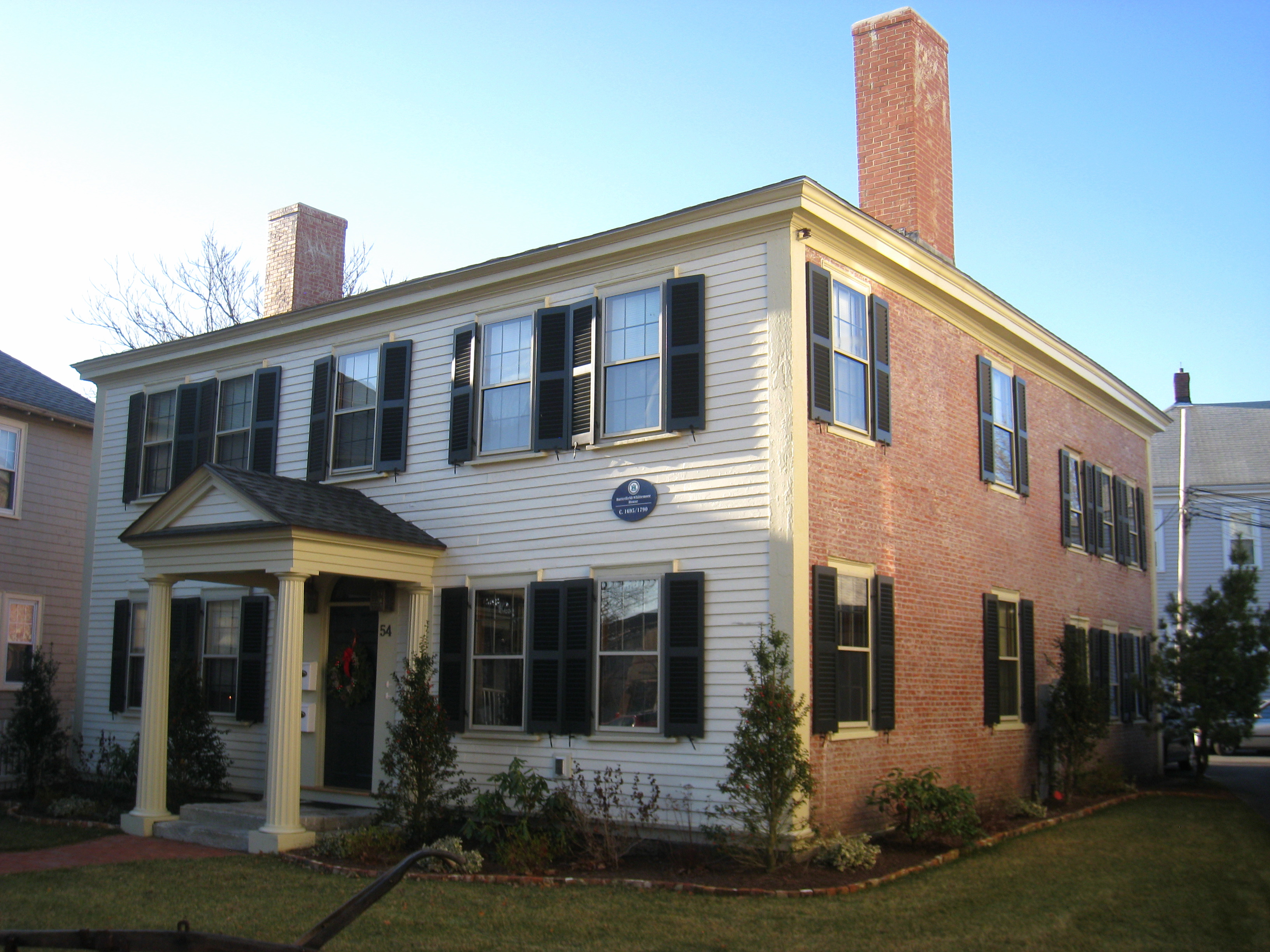

- Location within Massachusetts Location within the United States
- Location: 54 Massachusetts Ave., Arlington, Massachusetts
- Coordinates: 42°24′6″N 71°8′18″W
- Built: 1695
- Architect: Jonathan Butterfield
- NRHP reference No.: 78000429
- Added to NRHP: March 30, 1978

The Butterfield-Whittemore House, is a historic colonial house at 54 Massachusetts Avenue in Arlington, Massachusetts. With its oldest section dating to c. 1695, it is one of the town's oldest houses, and may be its oldest. It was listed on the National Register of Historic Places in 1978.

== Description and history ==
The Butterfield-Whittemore House stands on the south side of Massachusetts Avenue in East Arlington, between Fairmont and Lafayette Streets. It is set back from the street relative to the flanking multifamily buildings, and is set slightly askew from the current alignment of the road. It is a two-story wood-frame structure, with a hip roof, clapboarded front, and brick sidewalls. The roof is pierced by interior chimneys. The main facade is five bays wide and symmetrical, with the centered entrance sheltered by a gabled porch supported by fluted columns.

The earliest part of the house was built about 1695 by Johnathan Butterfield, a field driver in Menotomy, as Arlington was then called. It was sold in 1749 to Samuel Whittemore III, son of the local American Revolutionary War hero of the same name. The locally famous Whittemore was long thought to own this house, but was actually living in a house across Massachusetts Avenue. Greek Revival modifications were made about 1845, and a new porch added circa 1920. Restorations began in 2006 and have since completed. The house's position relative to Massachusetts Avenue is unusual because it is reflective of the road's early 18th century alignment.

== See also ==
- National Register of Historic Places listings in Arlington, Massachusetts
