= William Prentiss House =

Historic house in Massachusetts, United States

- U.S. National Register of Historic Places
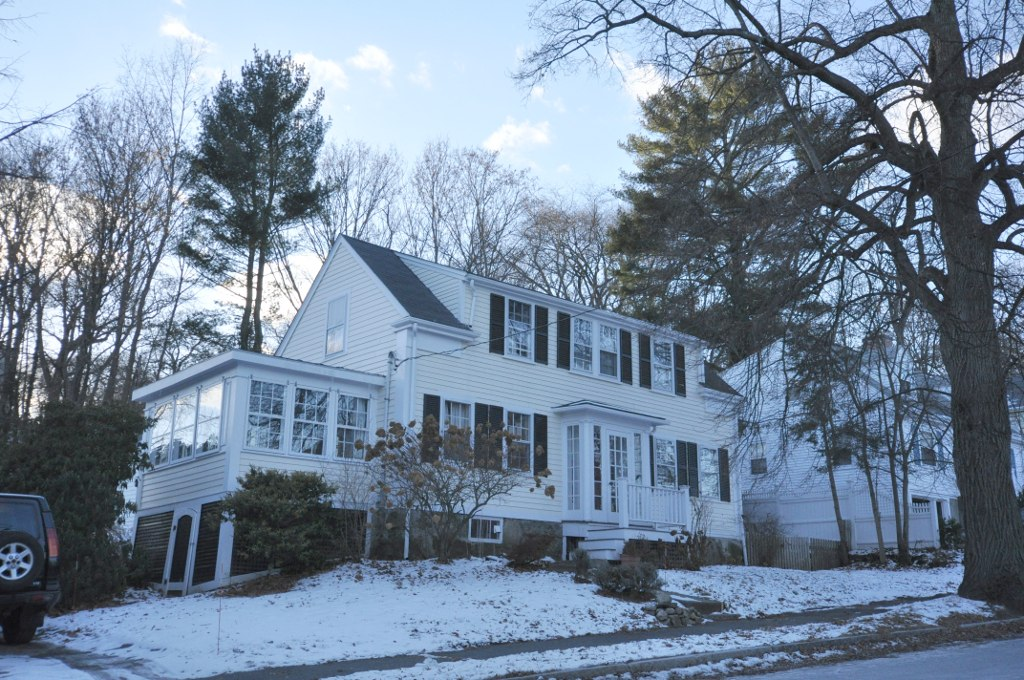

- Location within Massachusetts Location within the United States
- Location: 252 Gray Street, Arlington, Massachusetts
- Coordinates: 42°24′59″N 71°10′21″W
- Architectural style: Greek Revival
- MPS: Arlington MRA
- NRHP reference No.: 85002685
- Added to NRHP: September 27, 1985

The William Prentiss House is a historic Greek Revival style house in Arlington, Massachusetts. Built c. 1860, it is one of the oldest houses in the Arlington Heights neighborhood of the town. It is 2 and a half stories in height, with a side gable roof that has a large shed-roof dormer. A 20th-century porch extends to the left side, and the centered entrance is sheltered by a modern glassy shallow vestibule. Stylistically, the house resembles a number of houses built in East Arlington around the same time, but is the only one of its type in this neighborhood. William Prentiss, a local farmer, was its first known owner. The house was listed on the National Register of Historic Places in 1985.

== See also ==
- National Register of Historic Places listings in Arlington, Massachusetts
- National Register of Historic Places listings in Middlesex County, Massachusetts
