= House at 45 Claremont Avenue =

Historic house in Massachusetts, United States

- U.S. National Register of Historic Places
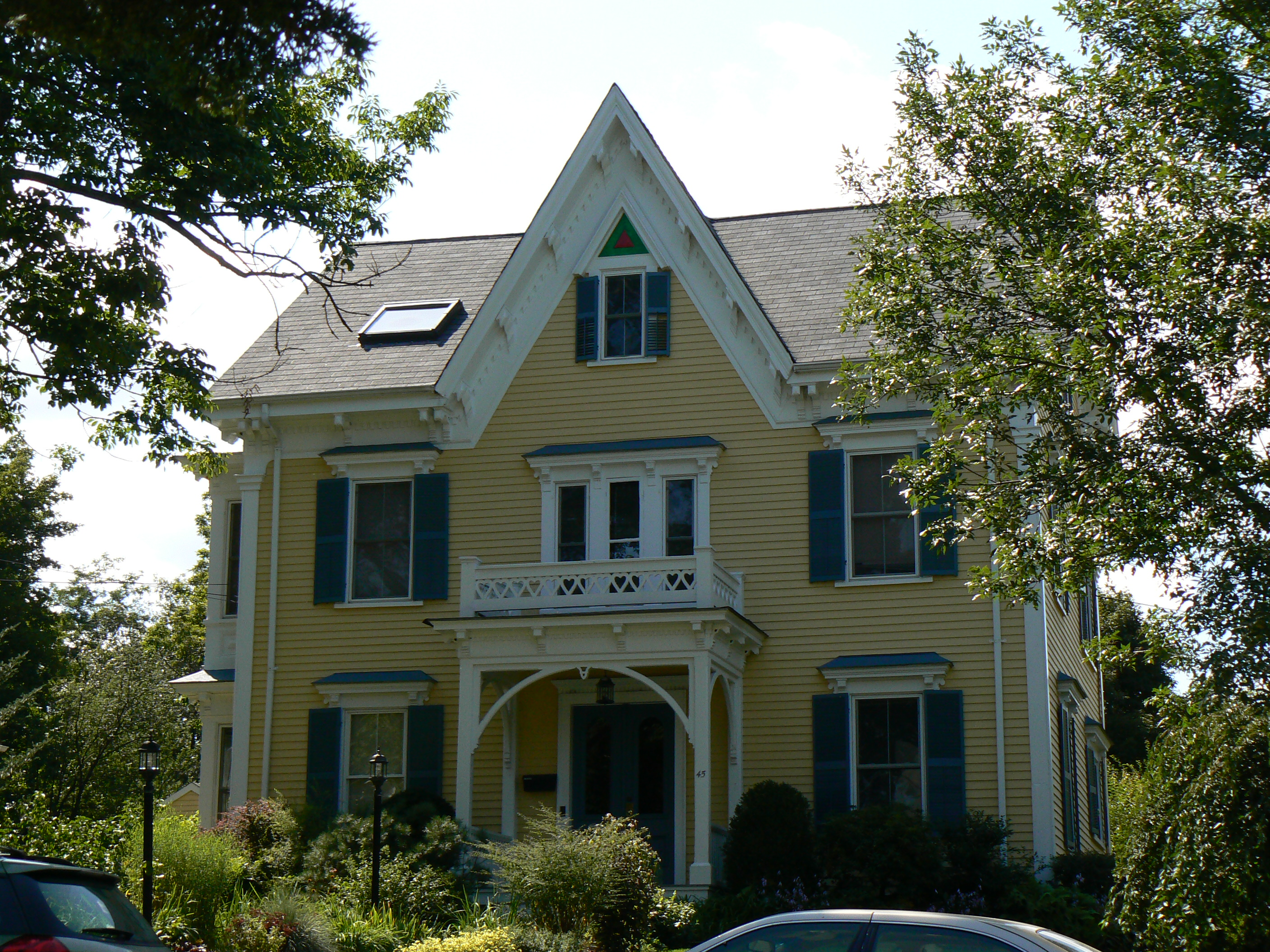
- Photo taken in 2008

- Location within Massachusetts Location within the United States
- Location: 45 Claremont Ave., Arlington, Massachusetts
- Coordinates: 42°25′11″N 71°12′37″W
- Built: 1885
- Architectural style: Gothic, Italianate
- MPS: Arlington MRA
- NRHP reference No.: 85001036
- Added to NRHP: April 18, 1985

The house at 45 Claremont Avenue in Arlington, Massachusetts is a rare local example of transitional Italianate and Gothic Revival styling. Built c. 1885–90, the house has steeply pitched gables and almost Stick style porch decoration that are typical Gothic work, while the house's massing and the bracketed eaves are Italianate. One of its early owners was Theodore B. Merrick, an instructor at the Massachusetts Institute of Technology.

The house was listed on the National Register of Historic Places in 1985.

== See also ==
- National Register of Historic Places listings in Arlington, Massachusetts
