= Stephen Symmes Jr. House =

Historic house in Massachusetts, United States

- U.S. National Register of Historic Places
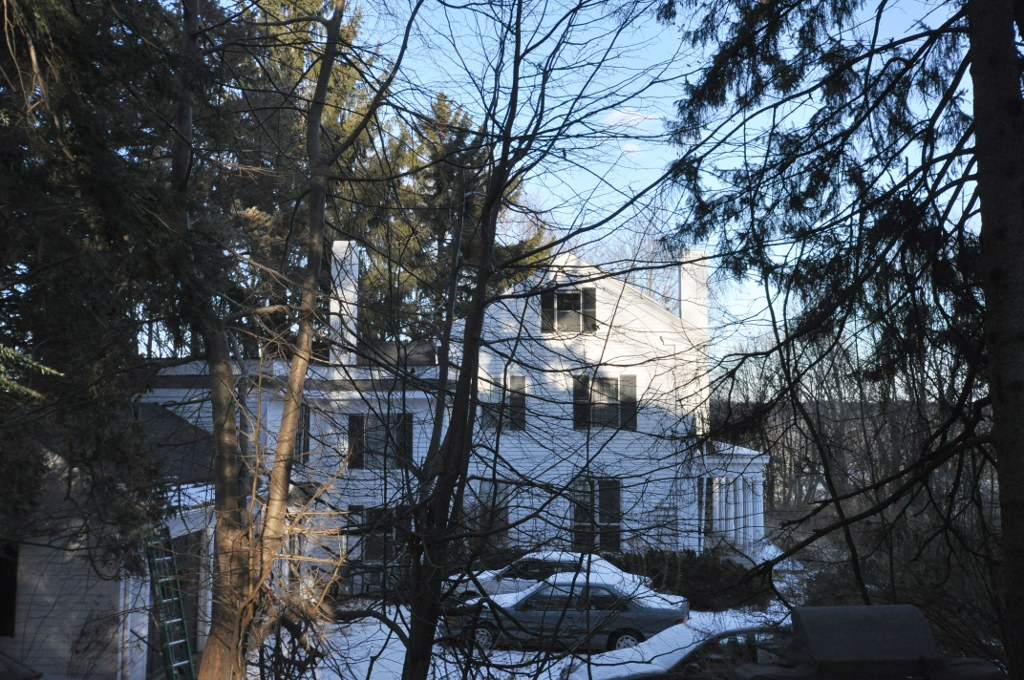

- Location within Massachusetts Location within the United States
- Location: 215 Crosby Street, Arlington, Massachusetts
- Coordinates: 42°25′49″N 71°9′23″W
- Built: 1841
- Architectural style: Greek Revival
- MPS: Arlington MRA
- NRHP reference No.: 85001049
- Added to NRHP: April 18, 1985

The Stephen Symmes Jr. House is a historic house in Arlington, Massachusetts. It is built on land that was held in the Symmes family since 1703, when it was purchased from a Native American. Although it has been claimed to date to 1746, the house was probably built in 1841, and may incorporate parts of an older building within it. The building is one of the finest examples of Greek Revival architecture in Arlington, with a pillared porch on two sides. The house is notable for its association with Stephen Symmes Jr., who bequeathed this property to the town for use as a hospital.

== Symmes Hospital ==
The location of the house on Crosby Street was deemed unsuitable for use as a hospital, and the town was granted permission by the probate court to liquidate the estate and use the proceeds to build a hospital elsewhere. This resulted in the construction of Symmes Hospital in Arlington. Symmes Hospital served Arlington from 1901 to 1999, then stood vacant for several years until finally being torn down in 2008. Finally in 2013–2014, the hospital site was redeveloped as the Arlington 360 residences.

The house was listed on the National Register of Historic Places in 1985.

== See also ==
- National Register of Historic Places listings in Arlington, Massachusetts
- National Register of Historic Places listings in Middlesex County, Massachusetts
