= Damon House (Arlington, Massachusetts) =

Historic house in Massachusetts, United States

- U.S. National Register of Historic Places
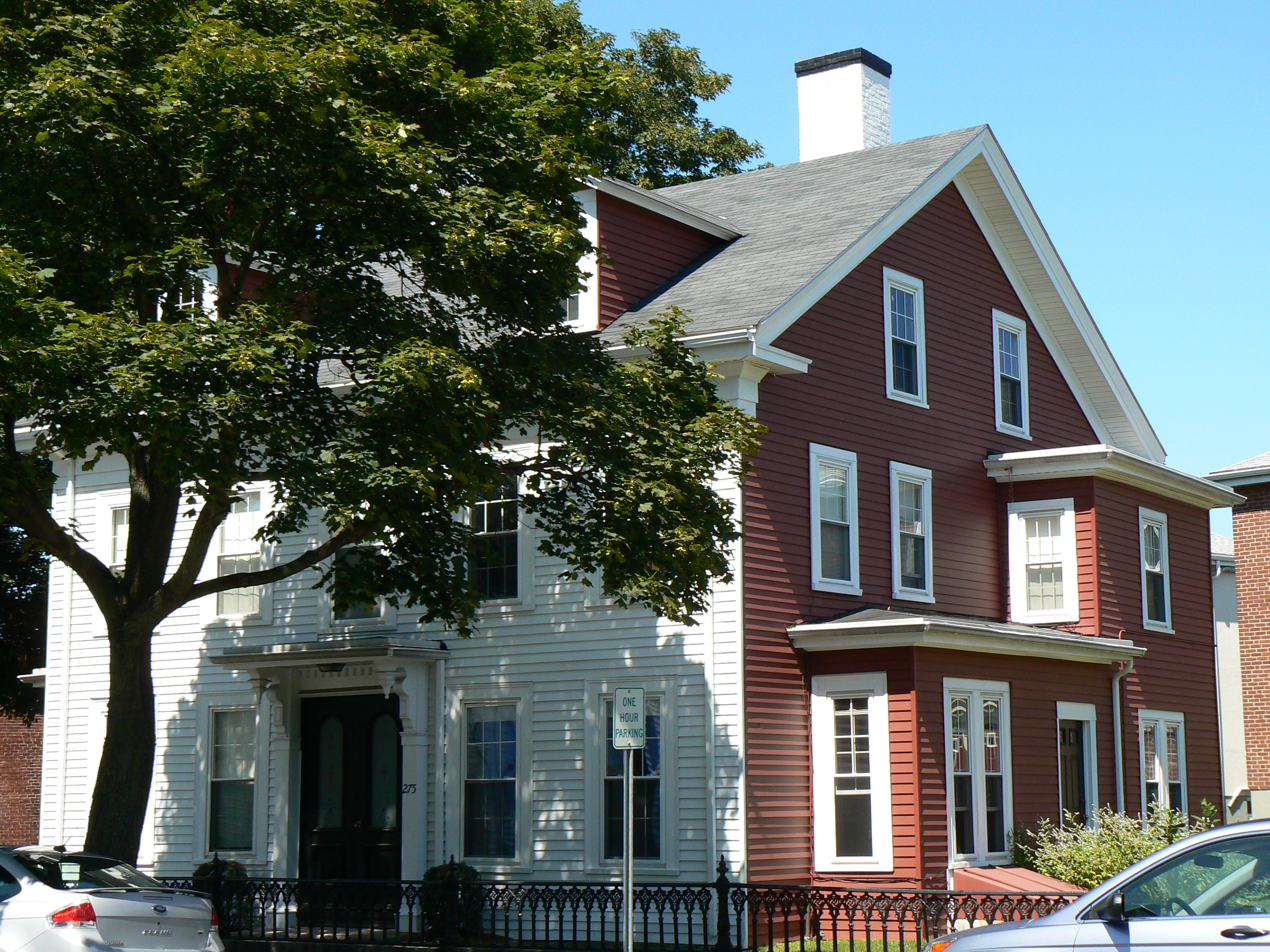
- A 2008 photograph

- Location within Massachusetts Location within the United States
- Location: 275 Broadway, Arlington, Massachusetts
- Coordinates: 42°24′49″N 71°8′55″W
- Built: 1850
- Architectural style: Greek Revival, Italianate
- MPS: Arlington MRA
- NRHP reference No.: 85001030
- Added to NRHP: April 18, 1985

The Damon House is a historic house in Arlington, Massachusetts. Although traditionally associated with the Rev. David Damon of the First Parish Church, this 2 1/2-story wood-frame house was probably built c. 1855, after Damon's death, by one of his descendants. It is five bays wide, with a side gable roof, and is predominantly Greek Revival in its styling. In 1875 it underwent some alteration, adding the Italianate front portico and small side additions. The house remained in Damon family hands into the 1940s.

The house was listed on the National Register of Historic Places in 1985.

== See also ==
- National Register of Historic Places listings in Arlington, Massachusetts
