= Alfred E. Robindreau House =

Historic house in Massachusetts, United States

- U.S. National Register of Historic Places
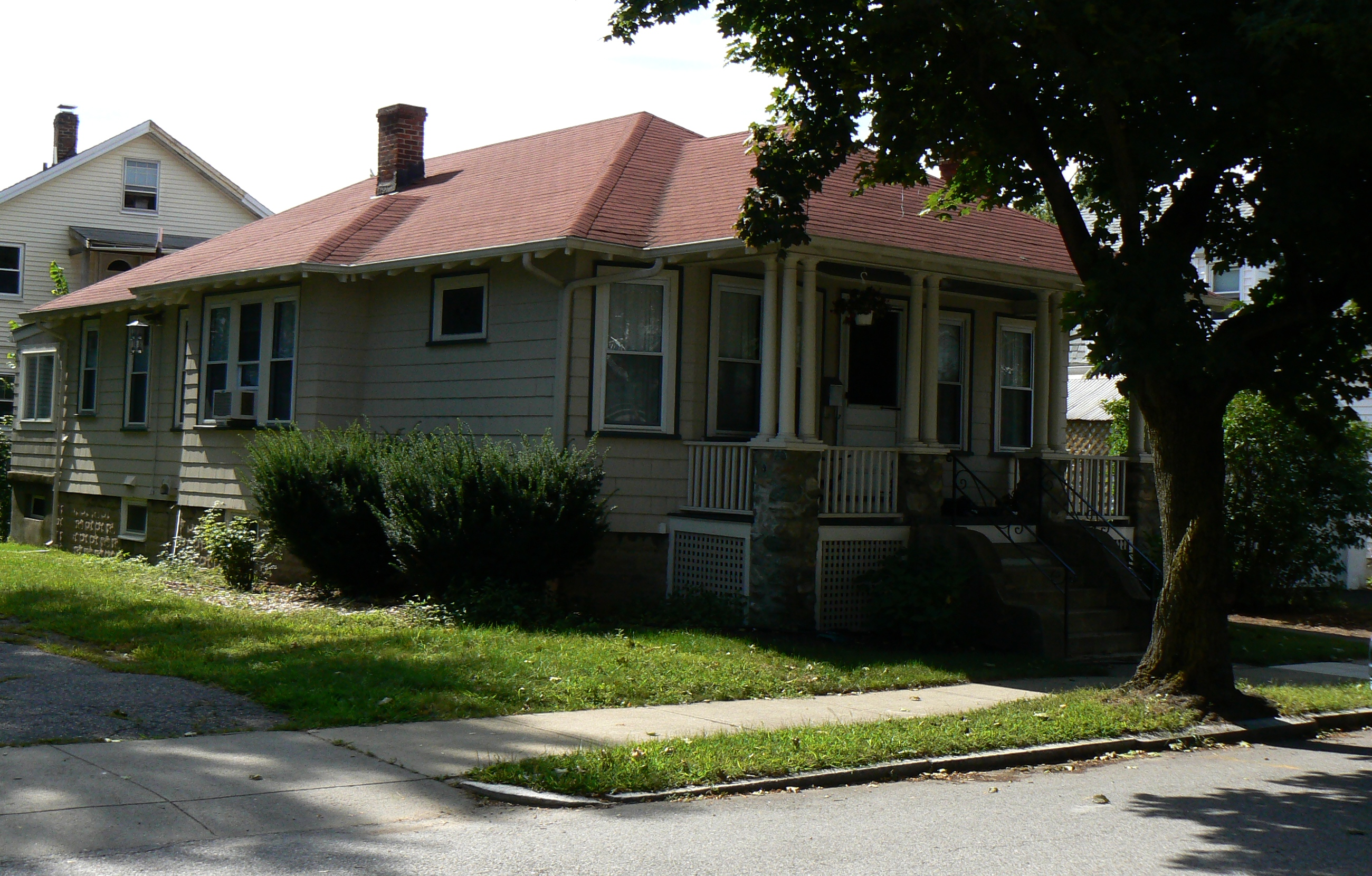
- Photo of the house, taken in 2008

- Location within Massachusetts Location within the United States
- Location: 28 Lafayette Street, Arlington, Massachusetts
- Coordinates: 42°24′3″N 71°8′20″W
- Built: 1920
- Architectural style: Bungalow/Craftsman
- MPS: Arlington MRA
- NRHP reference No.: 85001043
- Added to NRHP: April 18, 1985

The Alfred E. Robindreau House is a historic house in Arlington, Massachusetts. This house, built c. 1920 and first occupied by a poultry dealer, is a rare well-preserved 1 1/2-story hip-roofed Craftsman/Bungalow-style house in a neighborhood generally filled with Shingle and Colonial Revival houses. It has a hip-roofed front porch supported by clusters of columns mounted on fieldstone piers, and a chimney on the side with an exposed fieldstone base. The eaves of the roof have exposed rafter ends.

The house was listed on the National Register of Historic Places in 1985.

== See also ==
- National Register of Historic Places listings in Arlington, Massachusetts
