= Prentiss-Payson House =

Historic house in Massachusetts, United States

- U.S. National Register of Historic Places
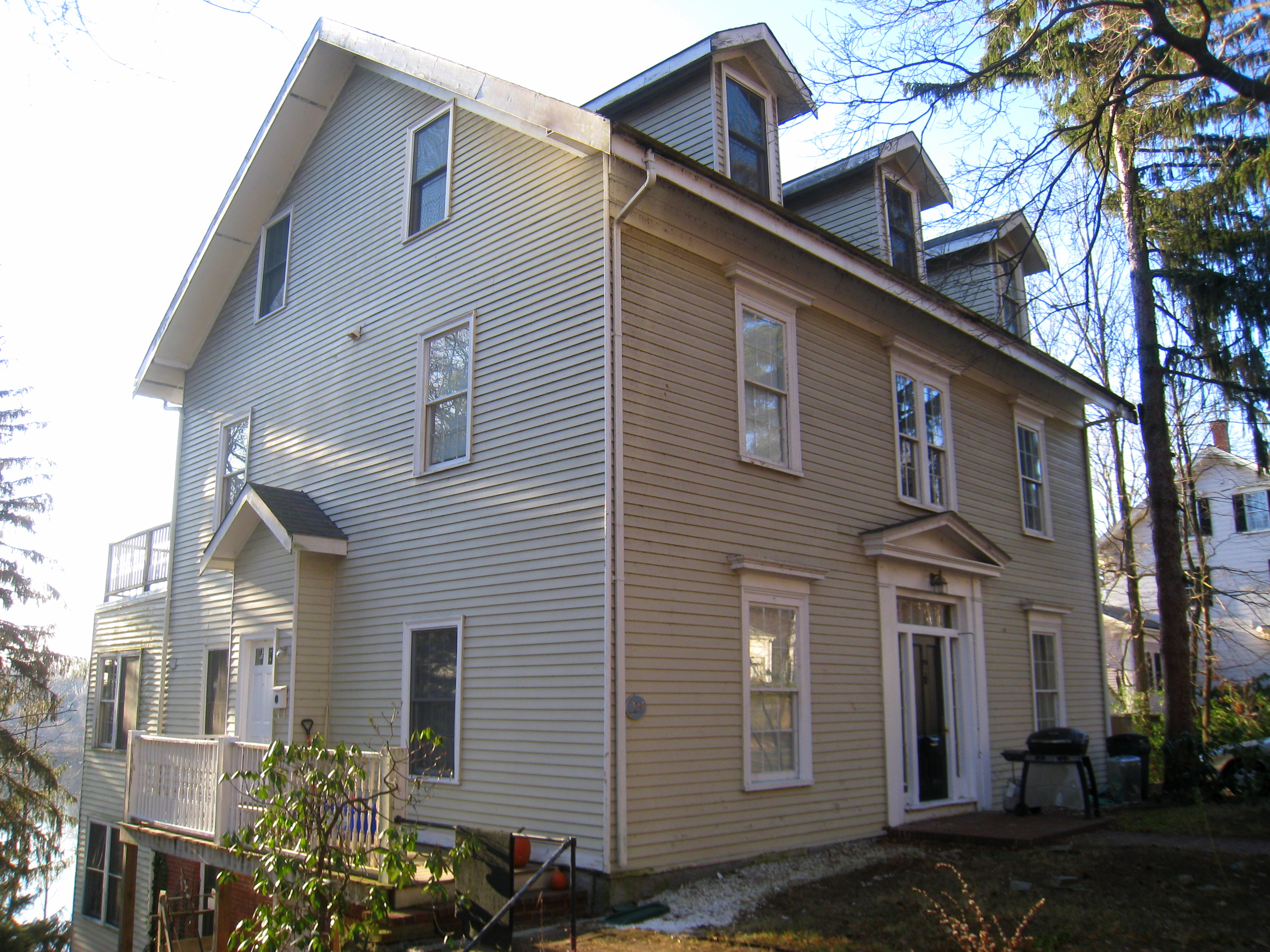

- Location within Massachusetts Location within the United States
- Location: 224–226 Pleasant Street, Arlington, Massachusetts
- Coordinates: 42°24′25″N 71°9′43″W
- Built: 1856; 170 years ago
- Architectural style: Greek Revival, Italianate
- MPS: Arlington MRA
- NRHP reference No.: 85001040
- Added to NRHP: April 18, 1985

The Prentiss-Payson House is a historic house in Arlington, Massachusetts. This 2 1/2-story clapboarded wood-frame house was built in 1856 for two women named Prentiss and Payson. Its massing and some of its styling is Italianate, but the front door surround, with sidelight and transom windows, pilasters, and triangular pediment, is distinctly Greek Revival in character. A later resident was Prentiss Payson, organist at a local church and a music teacher.

The house was listed on the National Register of Historic Places in 1985.

== See also ==
- National Register of Historic Places listings in Arlington, Massachusetts
