= Kensington Park Historic District =

Historic district in Massachusetts, United States

- U.S. National Register of Historic Places
- U.S. Historic district
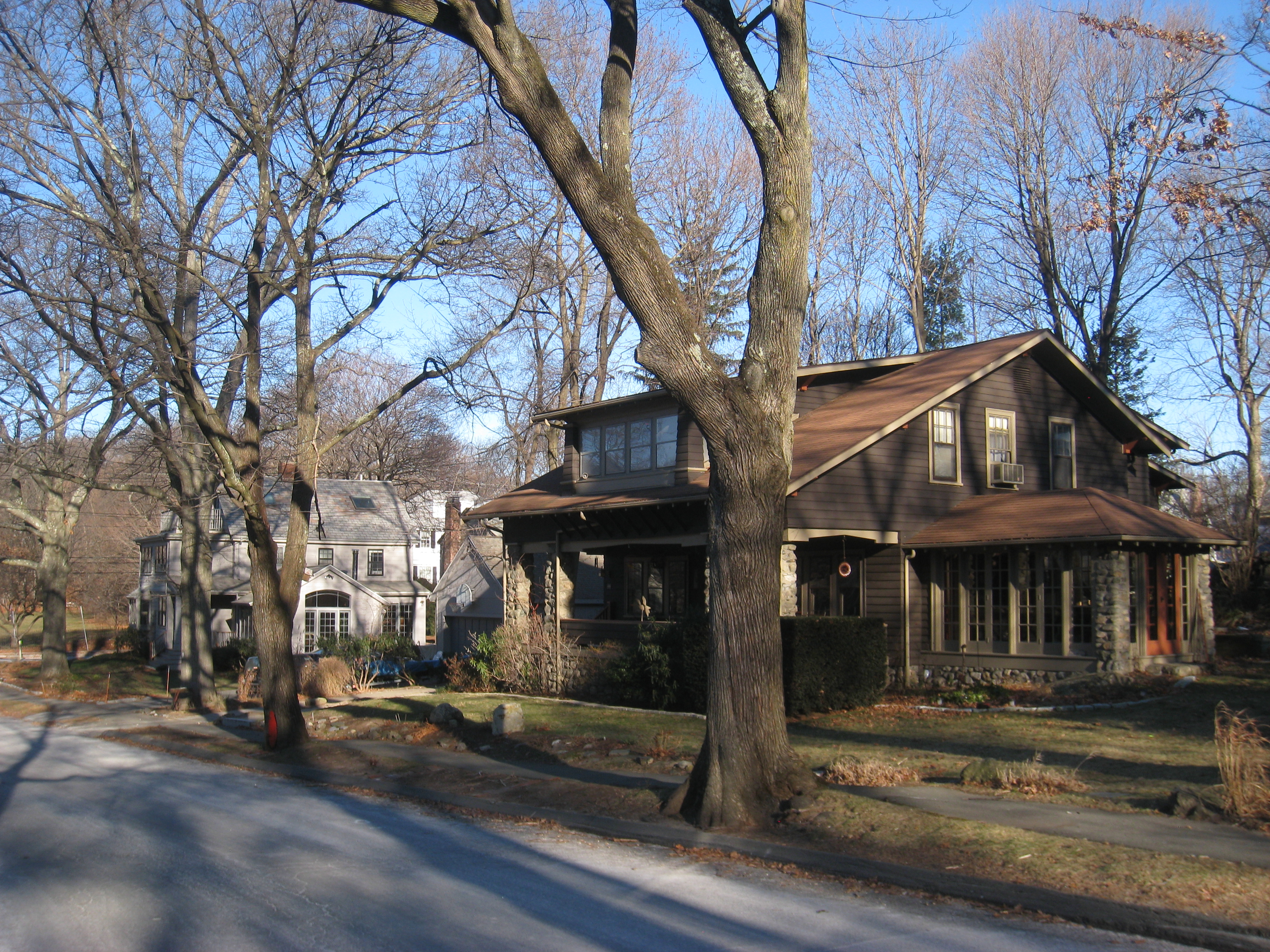
- Representative houses

- Location within Massachusetts Location within the United States
- Location: Arlington, Massachusetts
- Coordinates: 42°24′21″N 71°8′45″W
- Architect: McClare, C. Herbert
- Architectural style: Colonial Revival, Bungalow/Craftsman, Late Victorian
- MPS: Arlington MRA
- NRHP reference No.: 85002679
- Added to NRHP: September 27, 1985

The Kensington Park Historic District of Arlington, Massachusetts encompasses a turn of the 20th century planned residential subdivision in the hills above the town center, representing an early phase in the town's transition from a rural to suburban setting. The district consists of most of the houses on Brantwood and Kensington Roads, which wind around a rocky hillside overlooking Pleasant Street and Spy Pond, just west of the center. A number of the houses are the work of architect C. Herbert McClare, who also lived in the area, and was one of the development's proponents. The district was listed on the National Register of Historic Places in 1985.

The Kensington Park subdivision was laid out in 1890 on land belonging to a number prominent local families. A syndicate of Boston and Cambridge businessmen funded the development, which was marketed as providing fresh air, and a number of modern amenities such as piped water and paved roads. The houses they built were large and predominantly Colonial Revival in styling, although other popular styles of the period, including Shingle, Craftsman, and Queen Anne, are represented in the surviving houses. McClare's own house at 9 Brantwood Road, built c. 1898, is a fine Queen Anne/Shingle style house with views of the Boston skyline. The Carroll House (101 Brantwood) is the neighborhood's finest example of the Bungalow style; it was built in 1900, and features the low-slung roofline typical of the style, with rustic fieldstone porch piers.

== See also ==
- National Register of Historic Places listings in Arlington, Massachusetts
