= Addison Hill House =

Historic house in Massachusetts, United States

- U.S. National Register of Historic Places
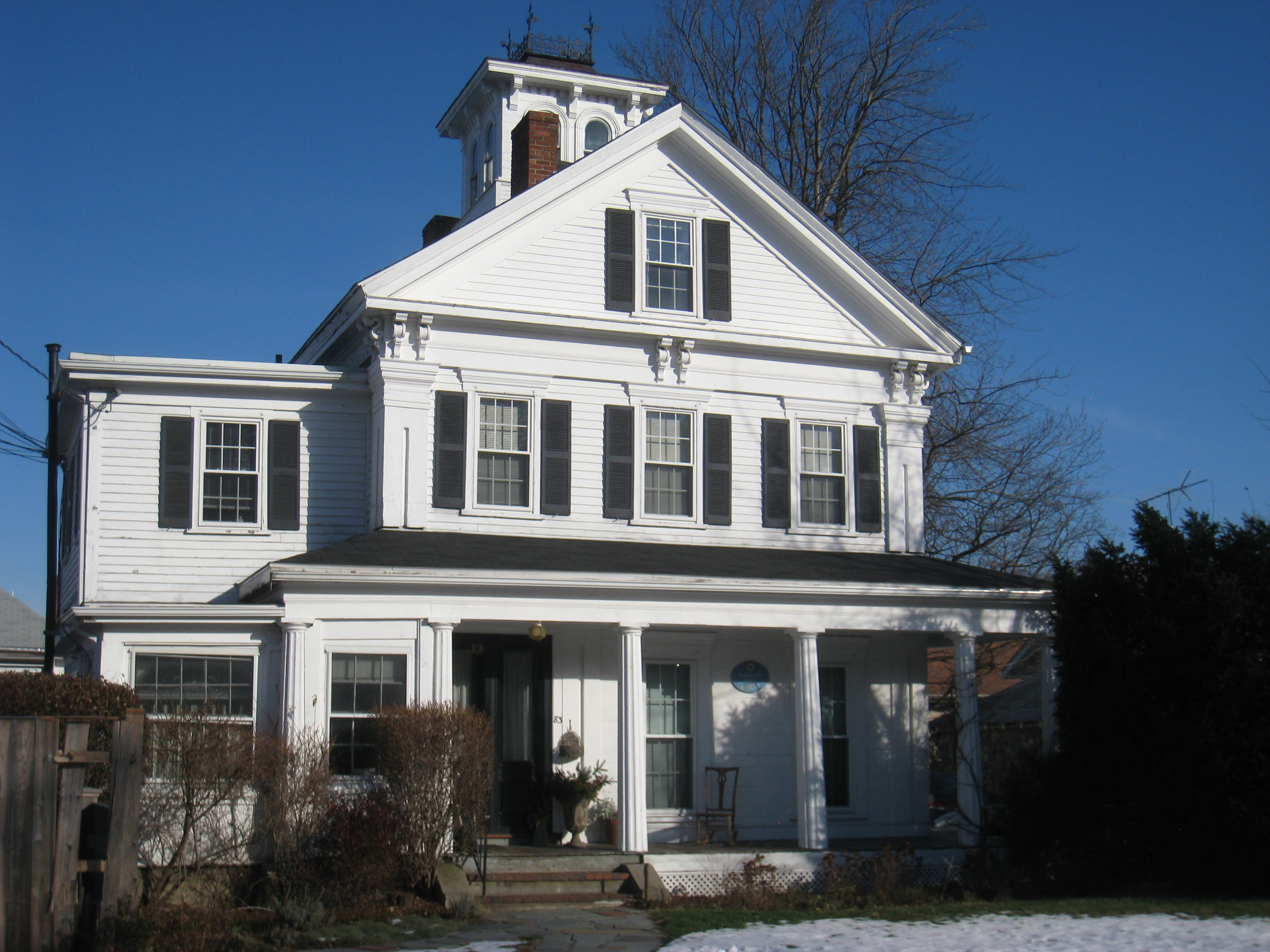

- Location within Massachusetts Location within the United States
- Location: 83 Appleton Street, Arlington, Massachusetts
- Coordinates: 42°25′23.1″N 71°10′49.7″W
- Architectural style: Greek Revival, Italianate
- MPS: Arlington MRA
- NRHP reference No.: 85002682
- Added to NRHP: September 27, 1985

The Addison Hill House is a historic house located in Arlington, Massachusetts.

== Description and history ==
The 2 1/2-story wood-frame house was built in the first half of the 19th century for Addison Hill, whose family dominated the upland area of Arlington in that period. The house is an excellent local example of transitional Greek Revival-Italianate styling. Its basic massing is Greek Revival, as is its front porch, but its eaves have double brackets typical of Italianate styling, and the cupola is also a distinctive Italianate touch.

The house was listed on the National Register of Historic Places on September 27, 1985.

== See also ==
- National Register of Historic Places listings in Arlington, Massachusetts
