= Lt. Benjamin Locke Store =

- U.S. National Register of Historic Places
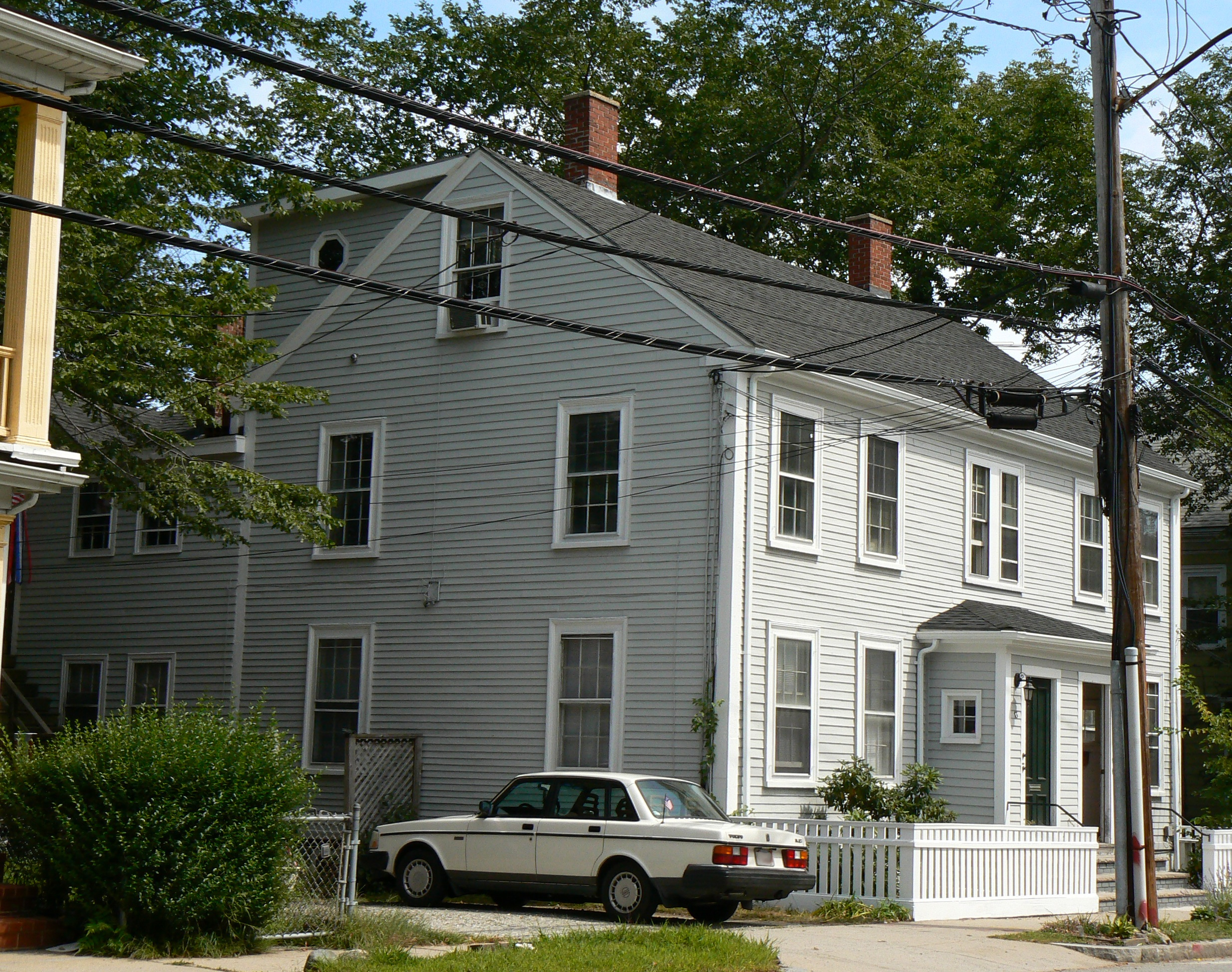
- Photo taken in 2008

- Location within Massachusetts Location within the United States
- Location: 11–13 Lowell Street, Arlington, Massachusetts
- Coordinates: 42°25′26″N 71°10′40″W
- Built: 1816
- Architectural style: Federal
- MPS: Arlington MRA
- NRHP reference No.: 85001068
- Added to NRHP: April 18, 1985

The Lt. Benjamin Locke Store is a historic building in Arlington, Massachusetts. It currently functions as a four-family private residence. The 2 1/2-story wood-frame structure was built in 1816 by Lieutenant Benjamin Locke, son of Revolutionary War veteran Captain Benjamin Locke. He established it as a shop to take advantage of the recently established Middlesex Turnpike, which ran past its door. It was converted into a four-family residence in 1854, a role it continues to serve. In 1912, the house was designated as a "pest house" during a smallpox outbreak, but its use was not required.

The building was listed on the National Register of Historic Places in 1985.

== See also ==
- National Register of Historic Places listings in Arlington, Massachusetts
