= Locke School =

- U.S. National Register of Historic Places
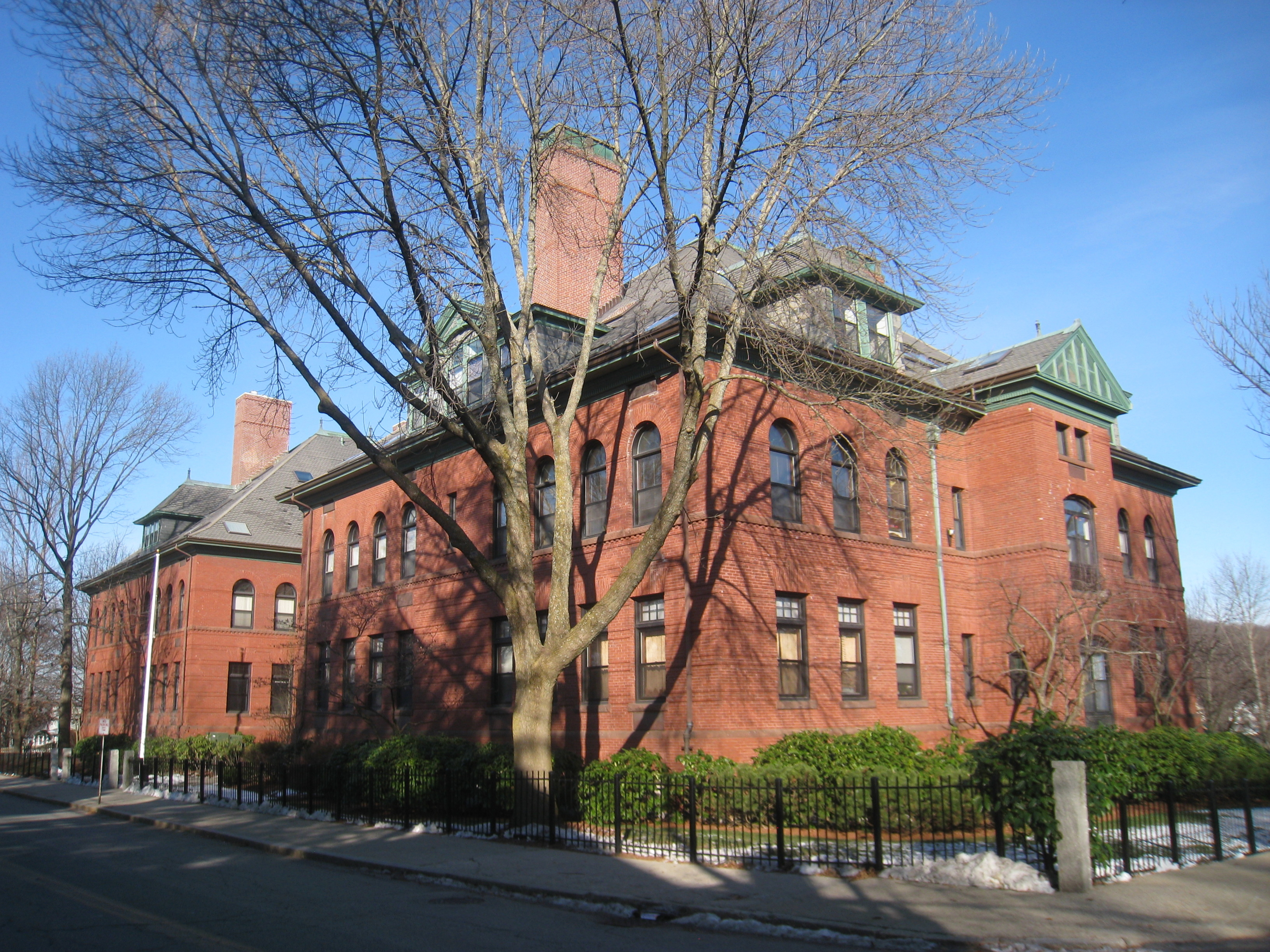

- Location within Massachusetts Location within the United States
- Location: Arlington, Massachusetts
- Coordinates: 42°25′24″N 71°10′57″W
- Built: 1899
- Architect: Gay & Proctor
- Architectural style: Renaissance
- MPS: Arlington MRA
- NRHP reference No.: 85002684
- Added to NRHP: September 27, 1985

The Locke School is a historic school building at 88 Park Avenue in Arlington, Massachusetts. The two-story brick building was built in 1899 to a design by Gay & Proctor. Shaped like an H, it has a hip roof and Renaissance Revival styling. It was built in the site of an older wood-frame school (built 1878), which was moved and used by the railroad until it was demolished about 1936. In 1984 this building was converted into condominiums.

The building was listed on the National Register of Historic Places in 1985.

== See also ==
- National Register of Historic Places listings in Arlington, Massachusetts
