= Ella Mahalla Cutter Sterling House =

Historic house in Massachusetts, United States

- U.S. National Register of Historic Places
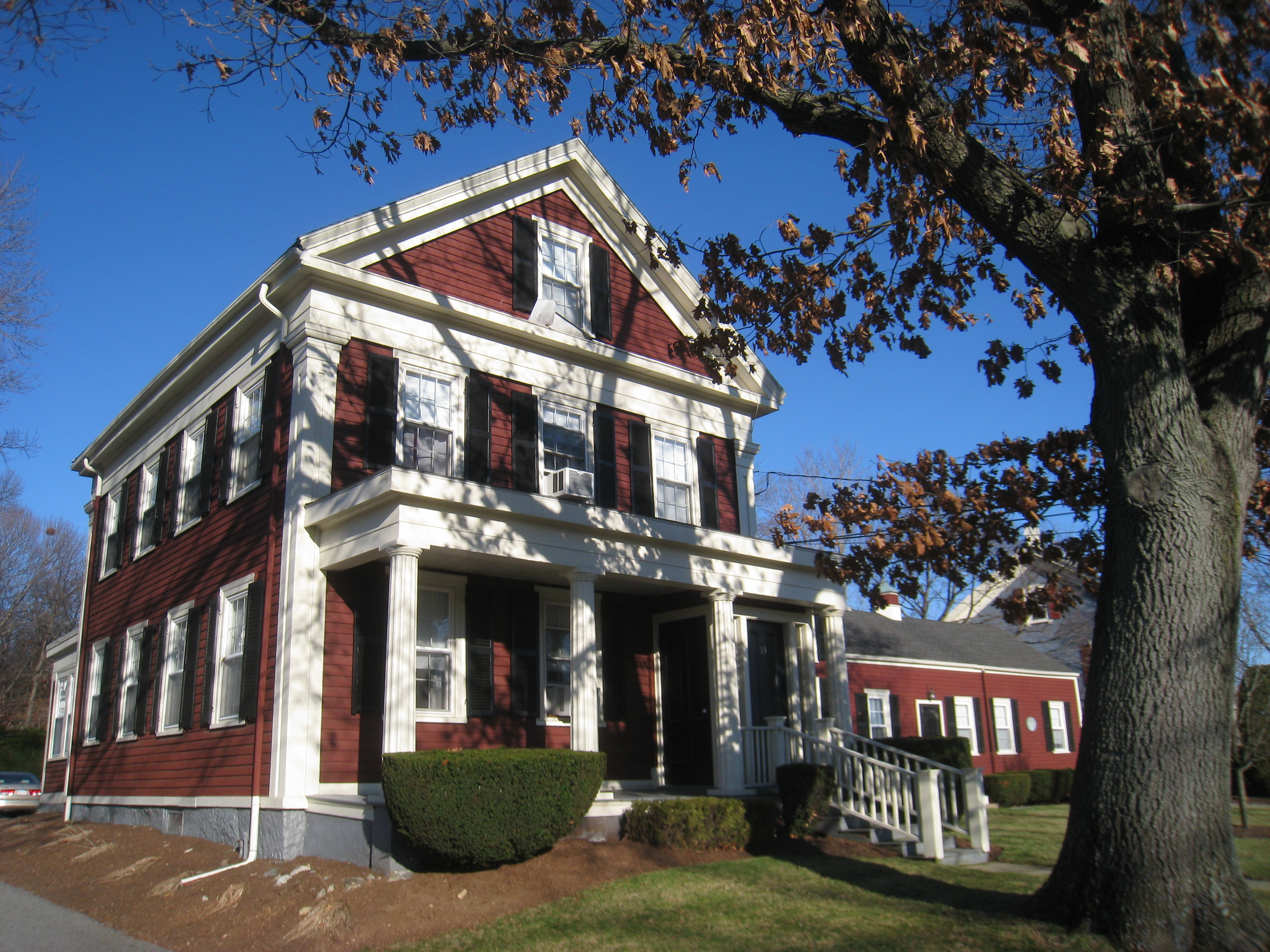

- Location within Massachusetts Location within the United States
- Location: 93 Summer Street, Arlington, Massachusetts
- Coordinates: 42°25′8″N 71°9′28″W
- Built: 1840
- Architectural style: Greek Revival
- MPS: Arlington MRA
- NRHP reference No.: 85001047
- Added to NRHP: April 18, 1985

The Ella Mahalla Cutter Sterling House is a historic house in Arlington, Massachusetts. The 2 1/2-story wood-frame house was built c. 1845, and is considered one of Arlington's finest Greek Revival houses. It was built by Cyrus Cutter, father of Ella Mahalla Cutter Sterling, and member of a family that lived in what is now Arlington since the 17th century. It has a fully pedimented front-facing gable, with a flat-roof single-story porch supported by fluted Doric columns. Corner pilasters rise to an entablature that encircles the building.

The house was listed on the National Register of Historic Places in 1985.

== See also ==
- National Register of Historic Places listings in Arlington, Massachusetts
