= Russell Common =

- U.S. National Register of Historic Places
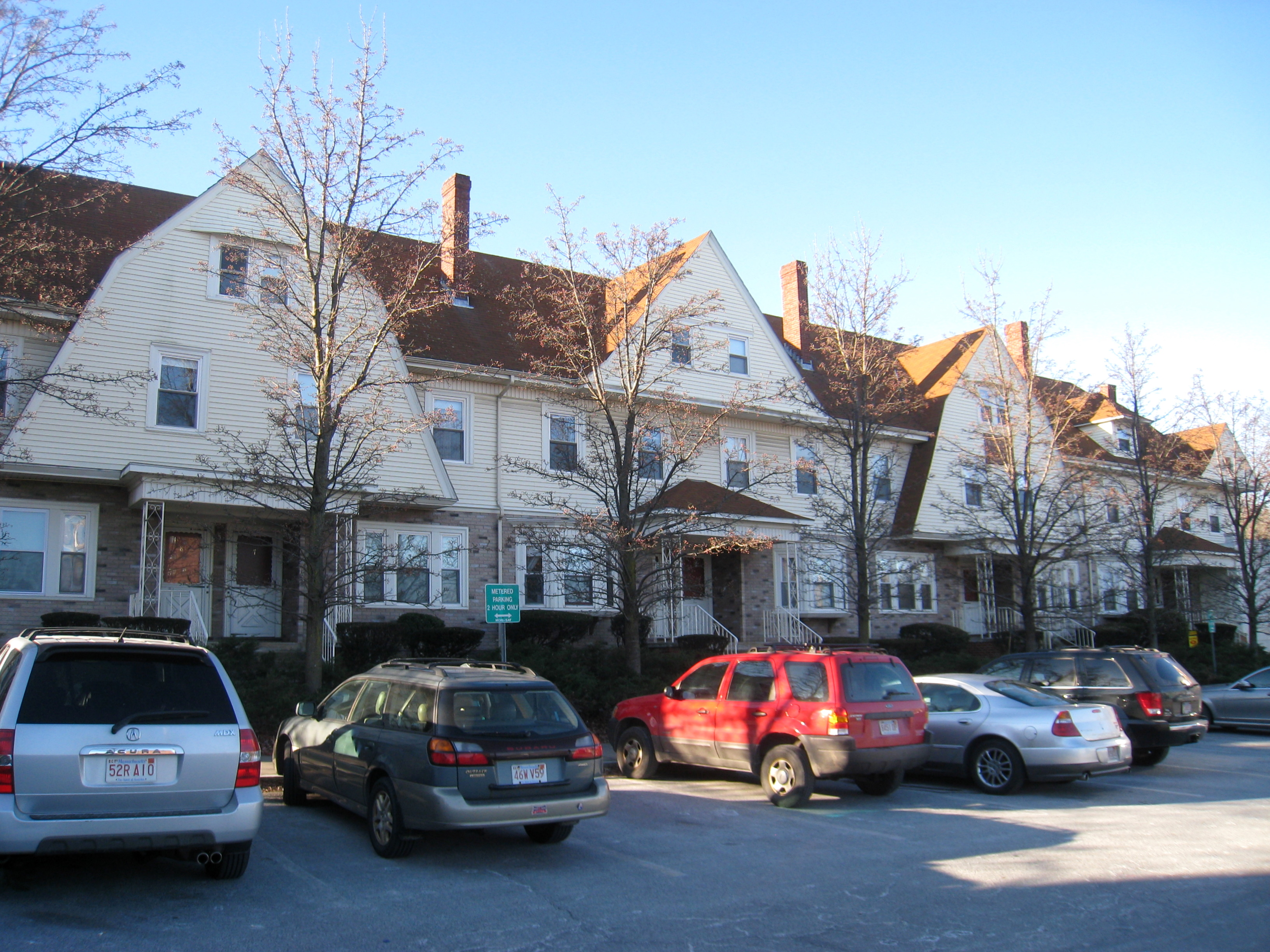

- Location within Massachusetts Location within the United States
- Location: Arlington, Massachusetts
- Coordinates: 42°24′56″N 71°9′9″W
- Built: 1898
- Architect: Gay & Proctor
- Architectural style: Shingle Style
- MPS: Arlington MRA
- NRHP reference No.: 85001046
- Added to NRHP: April 18, 1985

Russell Common is a historic row house at 2—10 Park Terrace in Arlington, Massachusetts. It is located just northeast of the center of town, behind the retail stores on Massachusetts Avenue. It is accessible from the municipal lot behind the Jefferson Cutter House (entries from Mystic St. and Medford St.) The 2 1/2-story building is a rare example of a multiunit Shingle style building, and was designed by the locally prominent firm of Gay & Proctor. It was built for its proximity to the railroad, but is now surrounded by the commercial center of Arlington, and a parking lot that was a park at the time of its construction.

The building was listed on the National Register of Historic Places in 1985.

== See also ==
- National Register of Historic Places listings in Arlington, Massachusetts
