= Winn Farm =

Historic house in Massachusetts, United States

- U.S. National Register of Historic Places
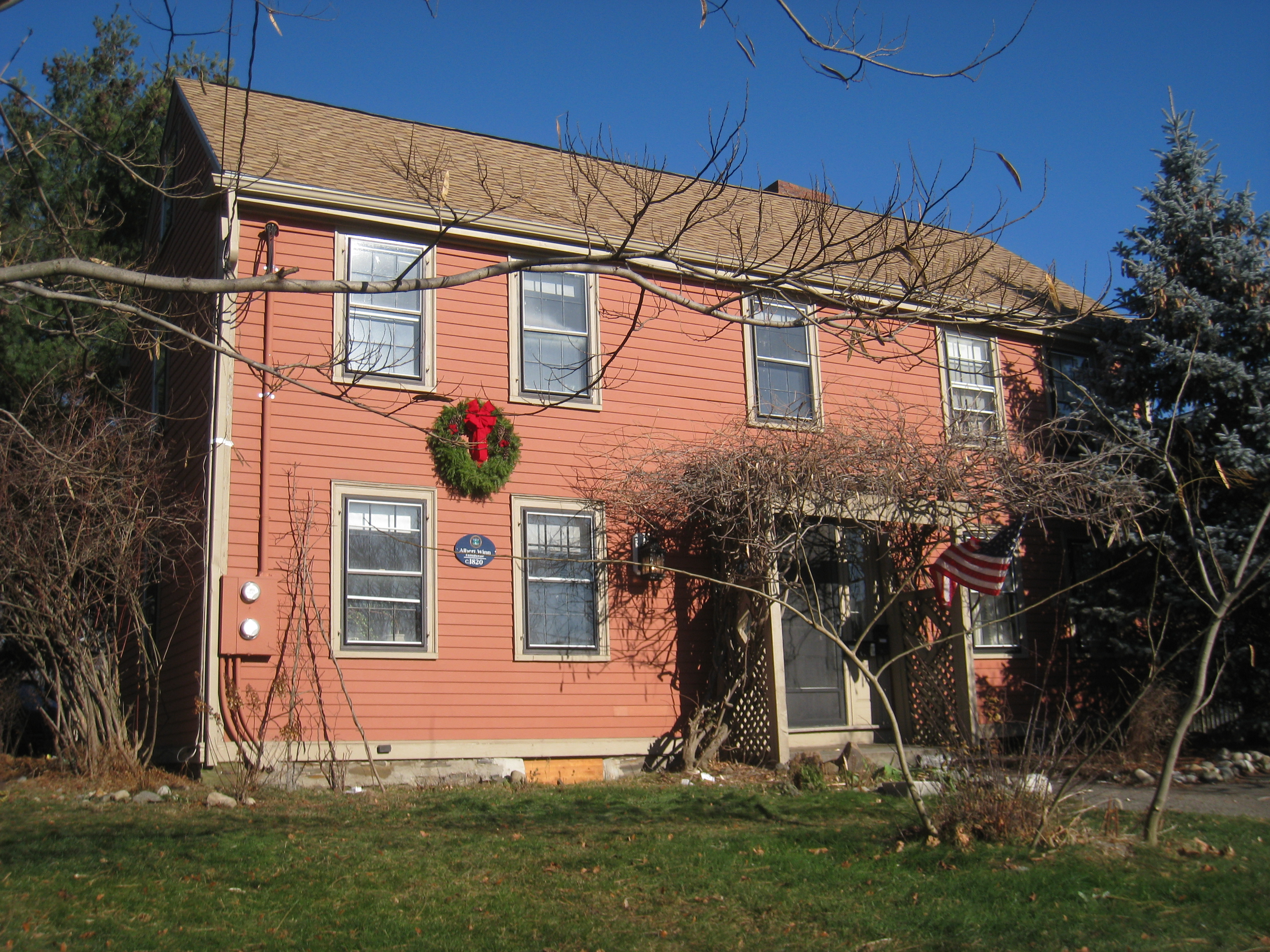

- Location within Massachusetts Location within the United States
- Location: 57 Summer St., Arlington, Massachusetts
- Coordinates: 42°25′8″N 71°9′22″W
- Area: less than one acre
- Built: 1820
- Architectural style: Federal
- MPS: Arlington MRA
- NRHP reference No.: 85001051
- Added to NRHP: April 18, 1985

Winn Farm is a historic farmhouse at 57 Summer Street in Arlington, Massachusetts, USA. The 2 1/2-story wood-frame house is estimated to have been built c. 1820, and is the only surviving farmhouse in northwestern Arlington from that period. It is a typical Federal style house, five bays wide, with a center entrance, standing in a part of the town that was not developed more fully until the 20th century. Albert Winn, its likely builder, was active in local civic affairs, serving in town offices and as a state representative.

The house was listed on the National Register of Historic Places in 1985.

== See also ==
- National Register of Historic Places listings in Arlington, Massachusetts
