= Orvis Road Historic District =

Historic district in Massachusetts, United States

- U.S. National Register of Historic Places
- U.S. Historic district
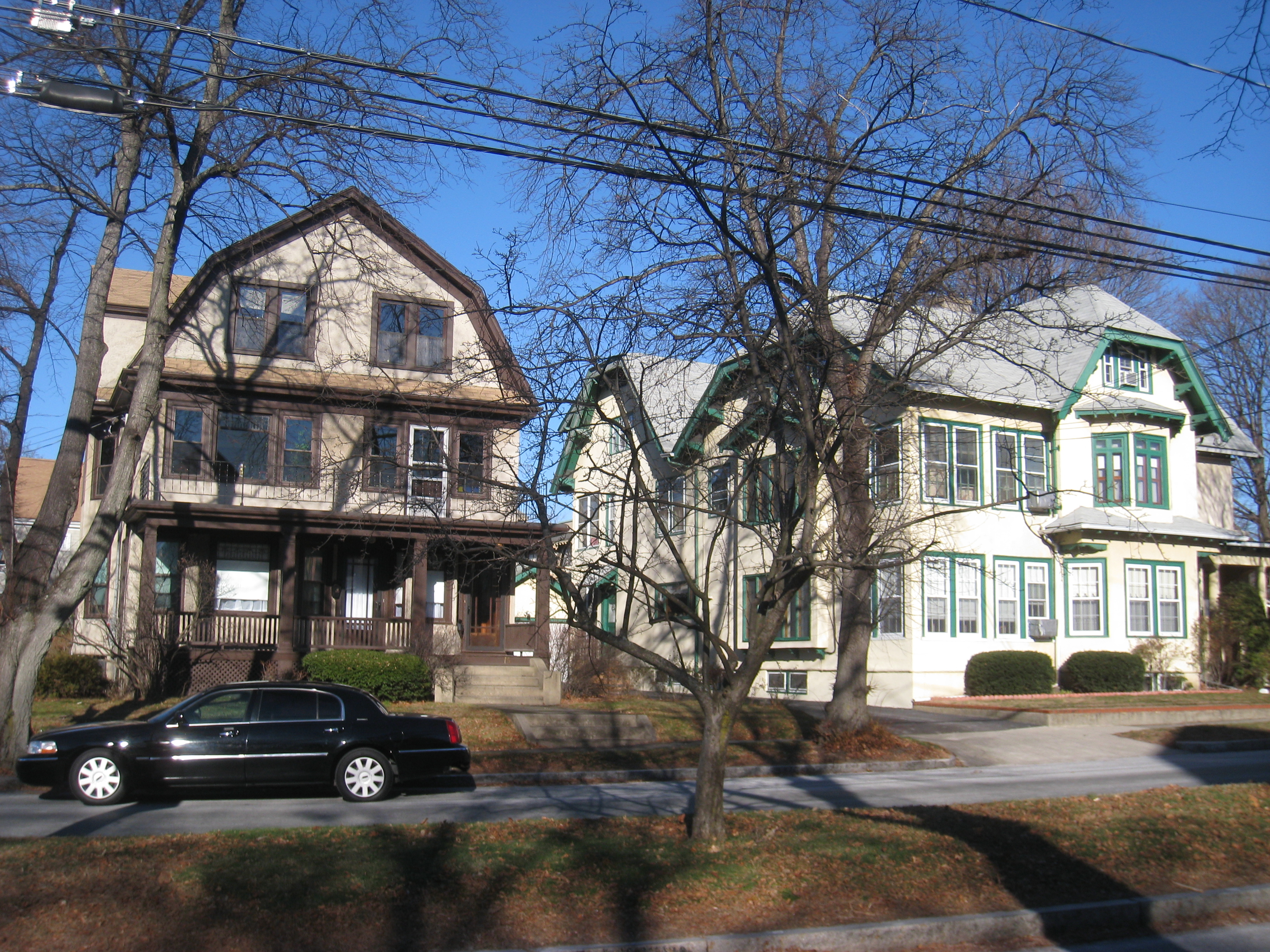
- Representative houses

- Location within Massachusetts Location within the United States
- Location: Arlington, Massachusetts
- Coordinates: 42°24′21″N 71°8′45″W
- Architectural style: Colonial Revival, Bungalow/Craftsman
- MPS: Arlington MRA
- NRHP reference No.: 85002677
- Added to NRHP: September 27, 1985

The Orvis Road Historic District is a residential historic district in eastern Arlington, Massachusetts. Built as a planned development between 1918 and 1930, Orvis Road contains a well-preserved collection of single and double-family houses of the period, as well its distinctive landscaping, which includes a grassy median not found in Arlington's other planned subdivisions. The district was added to the National Register of Historic Places in 1985.

== Description and history ==
Orvis Road is located in eastern Arlington, west of Lake Street and south of Massachusetts Avenue, major collector roadways in the area. Prior to subdivision, the land was part of the market garden farmland of John Squire. Development pressures in the early 20th century prompted many garden farmers to sell their land. Squire's land was attractively sited, with ready access to public transit and the road network.

Orvis Road runs north–south between Massachusetts Avenue and Brooks Avenue, with a small circle just south of the latter. The road consists of two one-way sections, divided by a wide grassy median planted with trees and shrubs. The houses that line it are typically wood-frame structures, between 1-1/2 and 2 1/2 stories in height, some of which have been finished in stucco. Most of them are stylistically representative of the Colonial Revival of the Craftsman/Bungalow movement. Many of the properties have c. 1920s garages, indicating the growing importance of the automobile to local residents. There are a total of 26 properties included in the district; all front on Orvis Road, except the house at the southwest corner of Orvis and Newcomb Road, which has a Newcomb Road address.

== See also ==
- National Register of Historic Places listings in Arlington, Massachusetts
