= Gershom Cutter House =

Historic house in Massachusetts, United States

- U.S. National Register of Historic Places
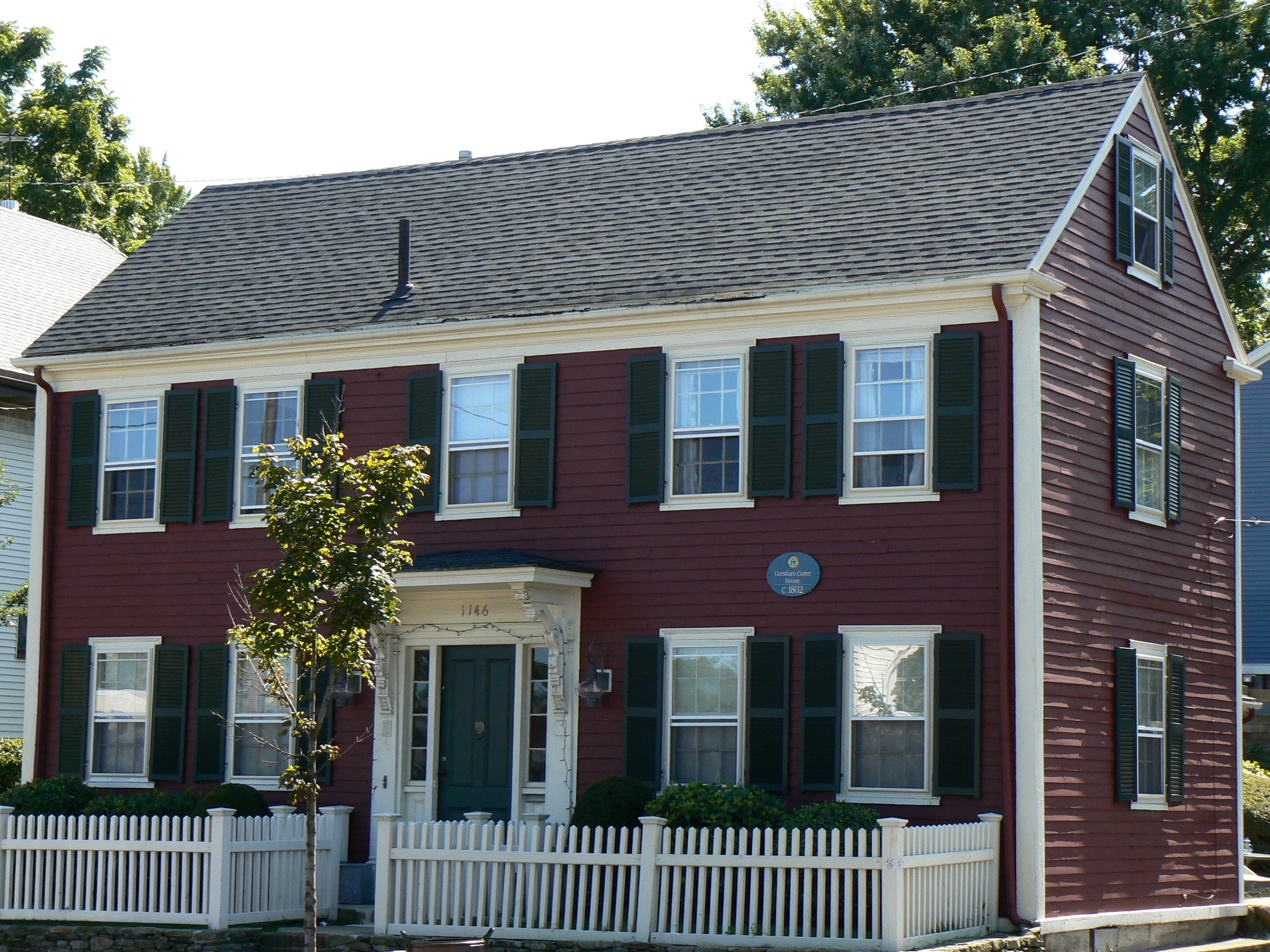
- Photograph taken in 2008

- Location within Massachusetts Location within the United States
- Location: Arlington, Massachusetts
- Coordinates: 42°25′11″N 71°10′11″W
- Built: c. 1835
- Architectural style: Greek Revival
- MPS: Arlington MRA
- NRHP reference No.: 99001306
- Added to NRHP: November 12, 1999

The Gershom Cutter House is a historic house at 1146 Massachusetts Avenue in Arlington, Massachusetts. Although traditionally ascribed a construction date of 1802, it is more likely, based on stylistic evidence and other documentary evidence, that this two-story wood-frame house was built c. 1835 by the sixth Gershom Cutter. The house standing on the site in 1802 (built by the fourth Gershom Cutter) was, according to a family genealogy, demolished in 1804. The sixth Gershom acquired the property in 1833 and was married in 1834, and the building itself exhibits late Federal styling. The house remained in the Cutter family into the 20th century and underwent restoration in 1999.

The house was listed on the National Register of Historic Places in 1999.

== See also ==
- National Register of Historic Places listings in Arlington, Massachusetts
