= House at 5–7 Winter Street =

Historic house in Massachusetts, United States

- U.S. National Register of Historic Places
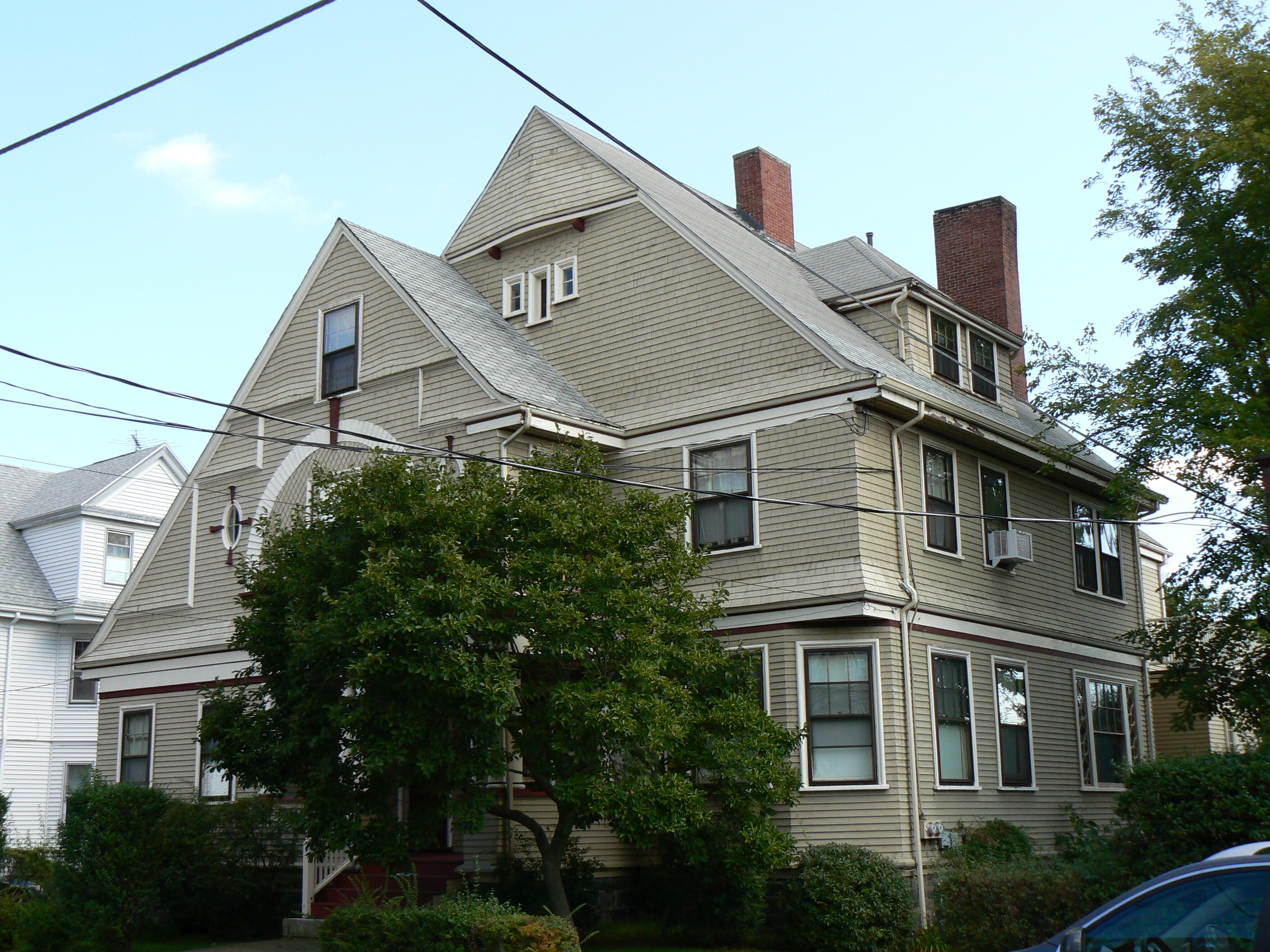
- Photo of the house, 2008

- Location within Massachusetts Location within the United States
- Location: Arlington, Massachusetts
- Coordinates: 42°24′22″N 71°8′32″W
- Built: 1895
- Architectural style: Shingle Style
- MPS: Arlington MRA
- NRHP reference No.: 85001037
- Added to NRHP: April 18, 1985

The House at 5–7 Winter Street in Arlington, Massachusetts is a rare late-19th century two family house in East Arlington. The wood-frame house was built in 1895 by John Squires, who owned a garden farm. It was built as a speculative venture at a time before Arlington's market gardeners began selling their land off for development. The building exhibits well-preserved Queen Anne styling, with asymmetric massing characteristic of that style, and a judicious use of decorative cut wood shingles.

The house was listed on the National Register of Historic Places in 1985.

== See also ==
- National Register of Historic Places listings in Arlington, Massachusetts
