= National Register of Historic Places listings in Arlington, Massachusetts =

The following properties are listed on the National Register of Historic Places in Arlington, Massachusetts.
This National Park Service list is complete through NPS recent listings posted May 1, 2026.

== Listings ==
	Name on the Register	Image	Date listed	Location	Description
1	Allyn House	Allyn House	September 27, 1985 (#85002680)	94 Oakland Ave. 42°25′08″N 71°10′44″W	
2	Arlington Center Historic District	Arlington Center Historic District	July 18, 1974 (#74000361)	Bounded by Massachusetts Ave. and Academy, Pleasant, and Maple Sts.; also roughly bounded by Jason St., Massachusetts Ave., and Pleasant and Gray Sts. 42°24′53″N 71°09′21″W	Second set of addresses represents a boundary increase
3	Arlington Coal & Lumber	Arlington Coal & Lumber	April 18, 1985 (#85001020)	41 Park Ave. 42°25′29″N 71°11′00″W	
4	Arlington Gaslight Company	Arlington Gaslight Company	April 18, 1985 (#85001021)	51 Grove St. (Town Yard); 42°25′13″N 71°09′48″W	
5	Arlington Pumping Station	Arlington Pumping Station	April 18, 1985 (#85001022)	Brattle Court off Brattle St. 42°25′19″N 71°10′13″W	
6	Arlington Reservoir	Arlington Reservoir	September 27, 1985 (#85002676)	Park Circle; 42°24′53″N 71°10′49″W	
7	Baptist Society Meeting House	Baptist Society Meeting House	April 18, 1985 (#85001023)	3–5 Brattle St. 42°25′15″N 71°10′11″W	
8	Maria Bassett House	Maria Bassett House	September 27, 1985 (#85002681)	8 College Ave. 42°25′40″N 71°09′14″W	
9	Butterfield-Whittemore House	Butterfield-Whittemore House	March 30, 1978 (#78000429)	54 Massachusetts Ave. 42°24′06″N 71°08′18″W	
10	Call-Bartlett House	Call-Bartlett House	April 18, 1985 (#85001024)	216 Pleasant St. 42°24′28″N 71°09′37″W	
11	Calvary Methodist Church	Calvary Methodist Church	June 23, 1983 (#83003433)	300 Massachusetts Ave. 42°24′32″N 71°08′52″W	
12	Capitol Theater Building	Capitol Theater Building	April 18, 1985 (#85001025)	202–208 Massachusetts Ave. 42°24′20″N 71°08′35″W	
13	Chapel of St. Anne	Chapel of St. Anne	April 18, 1985 (#85001026)	approximately 30 Claremont Ave. 42°25′16″N 71°11′07″W	The chapel is on (or only accessible through) the grounds of the Germaine Lawrence School, but is visible from the street.
14	Cushman House	Cushman House	April 18, 1985 (#85001027)	104 Bartlett Ave. 42°24′42″N 71°09′48″W	
15	Ephraim Cutter House	Ephraim Cutter House	March 29, 1978 (#78000430)	4 Water St. 42°24′59″N 71°09′17″W	
16	Gershom Cutter House	Gershom Cutter House	November 12, 1999 (#99001306)	1146 Massachusetts Ave. 42°25′21″N 71°10′26″W	
17	Jefferson Cutter House	Jefferson Cutter House	January 23, 1992 (#85001028)	1 Whittemore Park; 42°24′55″N 71°09′12″W	
18	Second A. P. Cutter House	Second A. P. Cutter House	April 18, 1985 (#85001029)	89 Summer St. 42°25′08″N 71°09′29″W	
19	Damon House	Damon House	April 18, 1985 (#85001030)	275 Broadway; 42°24′49″N 71°08′55″W	
20	Edmund Dwight House	Edmund Dwight House	July 5, 1989 (#89000633)	5 Cambridge St., Winchester; 42°26′10″N 71°09′15″W	Property straddles the Arlington-Winchester line
21	Kimball Farmer House	Kimball Farmer House	April 18, 1985 (#85001031)	1173 Massachusetts Ave. 42°25′24″N 71°10′30″W	
22	First Parish Church Parsonage	First Parish Church Parsonage	April 18, 1985 (#85001032)	232–234 Pleasant St. 42°24′24″N 71°09′46″W	
23	Fowle-Reed-Wyman House	Fowle-Reed-Wyman House	April 14, 1975 (#75000244)	64 Old Mystic St. 42°25′54″N 71°09′25″W	
24	Greek Orthodox Church	Greek Orthodox Church	June 23, 1983 (#83000805)	735 Massachusetts Ave. 42°24′59″N 71°09′27″W	
25	Edward Hall House	Edward Hall House	April 18, 1985 (#85001033)	187 Pleasant St. 42°24′32″N 71°09′36″W	
26	Highland Hose House	Highland Hose House	April 18, 1985 (#85001034)	1007 Massachusetts Ave. 42°25′11″N 71°10′08″W	This is a fire station.
27	Addison Hill House	Addison Hill House	September 27, 1985 (#85002682)	83 Appleton St. 42°25′22″N 71°10′52″W	
28	Edward Hornblower House and Barn	Edward Hornblower House and Barn	April 18, 1985 (#85001035)	200 Pleasant St. 42°24′30″N 71°09′36″W	
29	House at 45 Claremont Avenue	House at 45 Claremont Avenue	April 18, 1985 (#85001036)	45 Claremont Ave. 42°25′13″N 71°11′07″W	
30	House at 5 Willow Court	House at 5 Willow Court	April 18, 1985 (#85001038)	5 Willow Ct. 42°25′01″N 71°09′33″W	
31	House at 5–7 Winter Street	House at 5–7 Winter Street	April 18, 1985 (#85001037)	5–7 Winter St. 42°24′22″N 71°08′32″W	
32	Kensington Park Historic District	Kensington Park Historic District	September 27, 1985 (#85002679)	Roughly bounded by Kensington Park, Brantwood, and Kensington Rds. 42°24′36″N 71°09′39″W	
33	W.W. Kimball House	W.W. Kimball House	April 18, 1985 (#85001039)	13 Winter St. 42°24′23″N 71°08′30″W	
34	Locke School	Locke School	September 27, 1985 (#85002684)	88 Park Ave. 42°24′52″N 71°10′58″W	
35	Capt. Benjamin Locke House	Capt. Benjamin Locke House	July 21, 1978 (#78000432)	21 Appleton St. 42°25′24″N 71°10′39″W	
36	Lt. Benjamin Locke Store	Lt. Benjamin Locke Store	April 18, 1985 (#85001068)	11–13 Lowell St. 42°25′26″N 71°10′40″W	This structure is currently a two-family house.
37	Milestone	Milestone	September 27, 1985 (#85002683)	Appleton St. and Paul Revere Rd. 42°25′22″N 71°10′53″W	The stone is located in a small triangular island in the intersection.
38	Mystic Dam	Mystic Dam	January 18, 1990 (#89002282)	Between Lower and Upper Mystic Lakes; 42°25′50″N 71°08′56″W	Extends between Medford and Arlington; incorrectly listed as being in Winchester
39	Mystic Valley Parkway, Metropolitan Park System of Greater Boston MPS	Mystic Valley Parkway, Metropolitan Park System of Greater Boston MPS	January 18, 2006 (#05001529)	Mystic Valley Parkway; 42°25′07″N 71°08′33″W	The Arlington section of the Mystic Valley Parkway runs from the intersection of Summer St. and Mystic Ave. (Route 2A and Route 3) north and then roughly ESE along the Mystic River to the junction with Alewife Brook Parkway in Somerville, thence back into Medford.
40	Old Schwamb Mill	Old Schwamb Mill	October 7, 1971 (#71000081)	17 Mill Lane and 29 Lowell St. 42°25′30″N 71°10′42″W	
41	Orvis Road Historic District	Orvis Road Historic District	September 27, 1985 (#85002677)	Roughly bounded by Massachusetts Ave. and Freeman, Randolph, and Newcomb Sts. on Orvis Rd. 42°24′21″N 71°08′45″W	
42	Pierce Farm Historic District	Pierce Farm Historic District	September 27, 1985 (#85002678)	Roughly bounded by Claremont and Oakland Aves. 42°25′00″N 71°11′01″W	
43	Pleasant Street Congregational Church	Pleasant Street Congregational Church	June 23, 1983 (#83000823)	75 Pleasant St. 42°24′50″N 71°09′23″W	Built in 1844
44	William Prentiss House	William Prentiss House	September 27, 1985 (#85002685)	252 Gray St. 42°24′59″N 71°10′21″W	
45	Prentiss-Payson House	Prentiss-Payson House	April 18, 1985 (#85001040)	224–226 Pleasant St. 42°24′25″N 71°09′43″W	
46	Prince Hall Mystic Cemetery	Prince Hall Mystic Cemetery	November 25, 1998 (#97001473)	Gardner St. 42°24′37″N 71°08′07″W	
47	William Proctor House	William Proctor House	April 18, 1985 (#85001041)	390 Massachusetts Ave. 42°24′45″N 71°09′44″W	
48	Warren Rawson Building	Warren Rawson Building	September 27, 1985 (#85002686)	68–74 Franklin St. 42°24′57″N 71°08′49″W	
49	Warren Rawson House	Warren Rawson House	April 18, 1985 (#85001042)	37–49 Park St. 42°24′52″N 71°08′35″W	
50	Alfred E. Robindreau House	Alfred E. Robindreau House	April 18, 1985 (#85001043)	28 Lafayette St. 42°24′03″N 71°08′20″W	
51	Robinson House	Robinson House	April 18, 1985 (#85001044)	19 Winter St. 42°24′25″N 71°08′28″W	
52	Robinson-Lewis-G. F. Fessenden House	Robinson-Lewis-G. F. Fessenden House	April 18, 1985 (#85001045)	40 Westminster Ave. 42°25′38″N 71°11′06″W	
53	Russell Common	Russell Common	April 18, 1985 (#85001046)	2–10 Park Terrace; 42°24′56″N 71°09′09″W	This is a row house located just northeast of the center of town, behind the retail stores on Massachusetts Ave. It is accessible from the municipal lot behind the Jefferson Cutter House (entries from Mystic St. and Medford St.)
54	Jason Russell House	Jason Russell House	October 9, 1974 (#74000363)	7 Jason St. 42°24′58″N 71°09′31″W	
55	Ralph W. Shattuck House	Ralph W. Shattuck House	September 27, 1985 (#85002687)	274–276 Broadway; 42°24′48″N 71°08′56″W	
56	Ella Mahalla Cutter Sterling House	Ella Mahalla Cutter Sterling House	April 18, 1985 (#85001047)	93 Summer St. 42°25′08″N 71°09′28″W	
57	Thomas Swadkins House	Thomas Swadkins House	April 18, 1985 (#85001048)	160 Westminster Ave. 42°25′48″N 71°11′13″W	
58	Henry Swan House	Henry Swan House	September 27, 1985 (#85002688)	418 Massachusetts Ave. 42°24′49″N 71°09′03″W	
59	Stephen Symmes Jr. House	Stephen Symmes Jr. House	April 18, 1985 (#85001049)	215 Crosby St. 42°25′49″N 71°09′23″W	
60	Taylor-Dallin House	Taylor-Dallin House	September 27, 1985 (#85002689)	69 Oakland Ave. 42°25′11″N 71°10′45″W	
61	US Post Office-Arlington Main	US Post Office-Arlington Main	June 18, 1986 (#86001351)	10 Court St. 42°25′00″N 71°09′22″W	
62	Wayside Inn	Wayside Inn	September 27, 1985 (#85002690)	393 Massachusetts Ave. 42°24′46″N 71°08′59″W	
63	Whittemore House	Whittemore House	April 18, 1985 (#85001050)	267 Broadway; 42°24′48″N 71°08′54″W	
64	Winn Farm	Winn Farm	April 18, 1985 (#85001051)	57 Summer St. 42°25′08″N 71°09′22″W	NRHP listing covers only the farmhouse, not an actual farm.

== See also ==
- National Register of Historic Places listings in Middlesex County, Massachusetts for listings in neighboring Belmont and Lexington
- National Register of Historic Places listings in Winchester, Massachusetts
- National Register of Historic Places listings in Cambridge, Massachusetts
- National Register of Historic Places listings in Medford, Massachusetts
