= Edward Hall House =

Historic house in Massachusetts, United States

- U.S. National Register of Historic Places
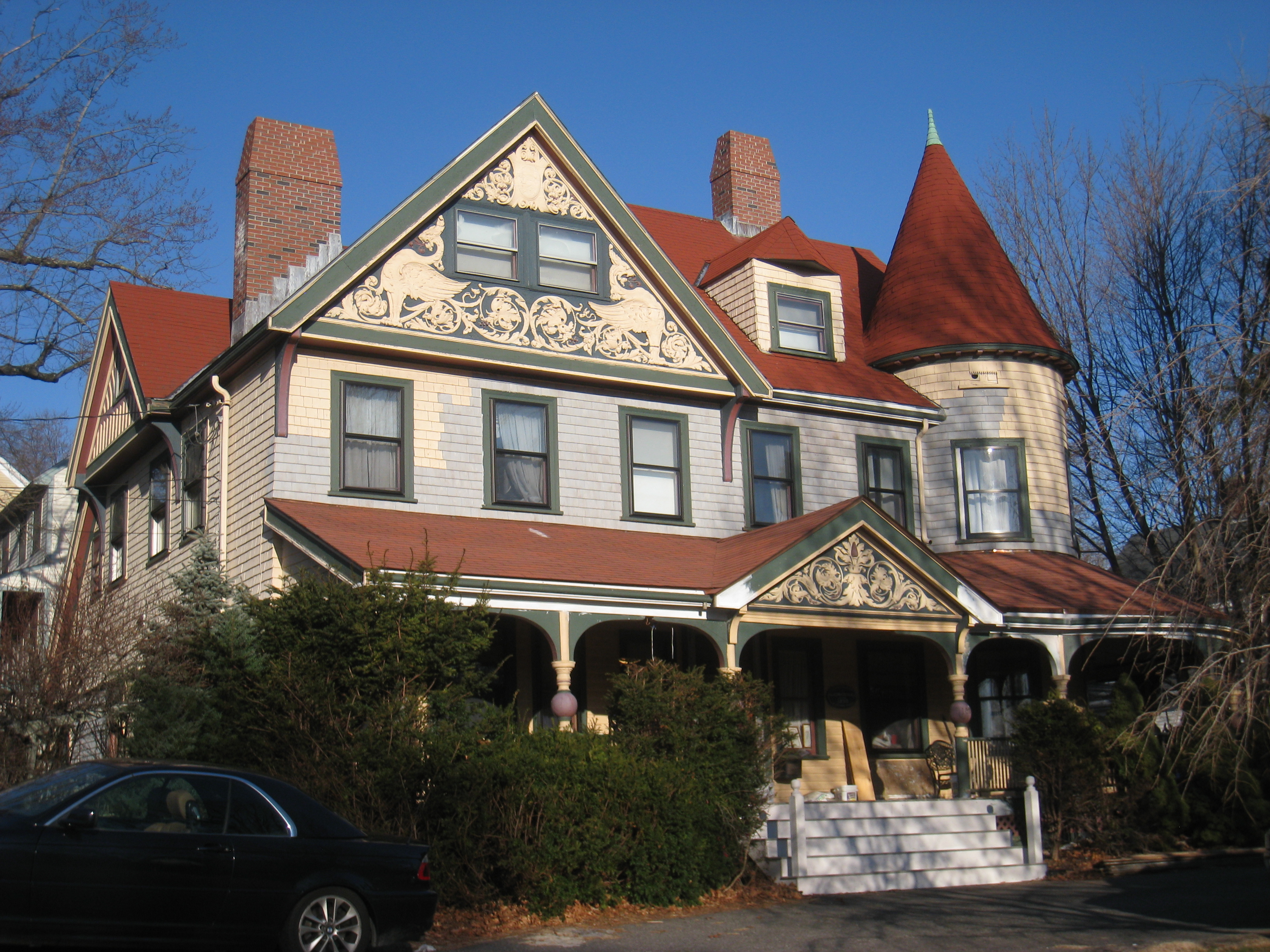

- Location within Massachusetts Location within the United States
- Location: 187 Pleasant Street, Arlington, Massachusetts
- Coordinates: 42°24′33″N 71°09′34″W
- Built: 1890
- Architectural style: Queen Anne
- MPS: Arlington MRA
- NRHP reference No.: 85001033
- Added to NRHP: April 18, 1985

The Edward Hall House is a historic house in Arlington, Massachusetts. The 2 1/2-story wood-frame house was built c. 1890 for Mrs. Edward Hall by Charles Bacon, owner of the Felt Mills in Winchester. It is one of the most elaborate treatments of Queen Anne style in the town, with asymmetrical massing typical of the style, Art Nouveau carvings in some of its gable ends, an elaborately decorated porch, and a turret with conical roof. The interior was destroyed by fire in 1893.

The house was listed on the National Register of Historic Places in 1985.

== See also ==
- National Register of Historic Places listings in Arlington, Massachusetts
