= Allyn House (Arlington, Massachusetts) =

Historic house in Massachusetts, United States

- U.S. National Register of Historic Places
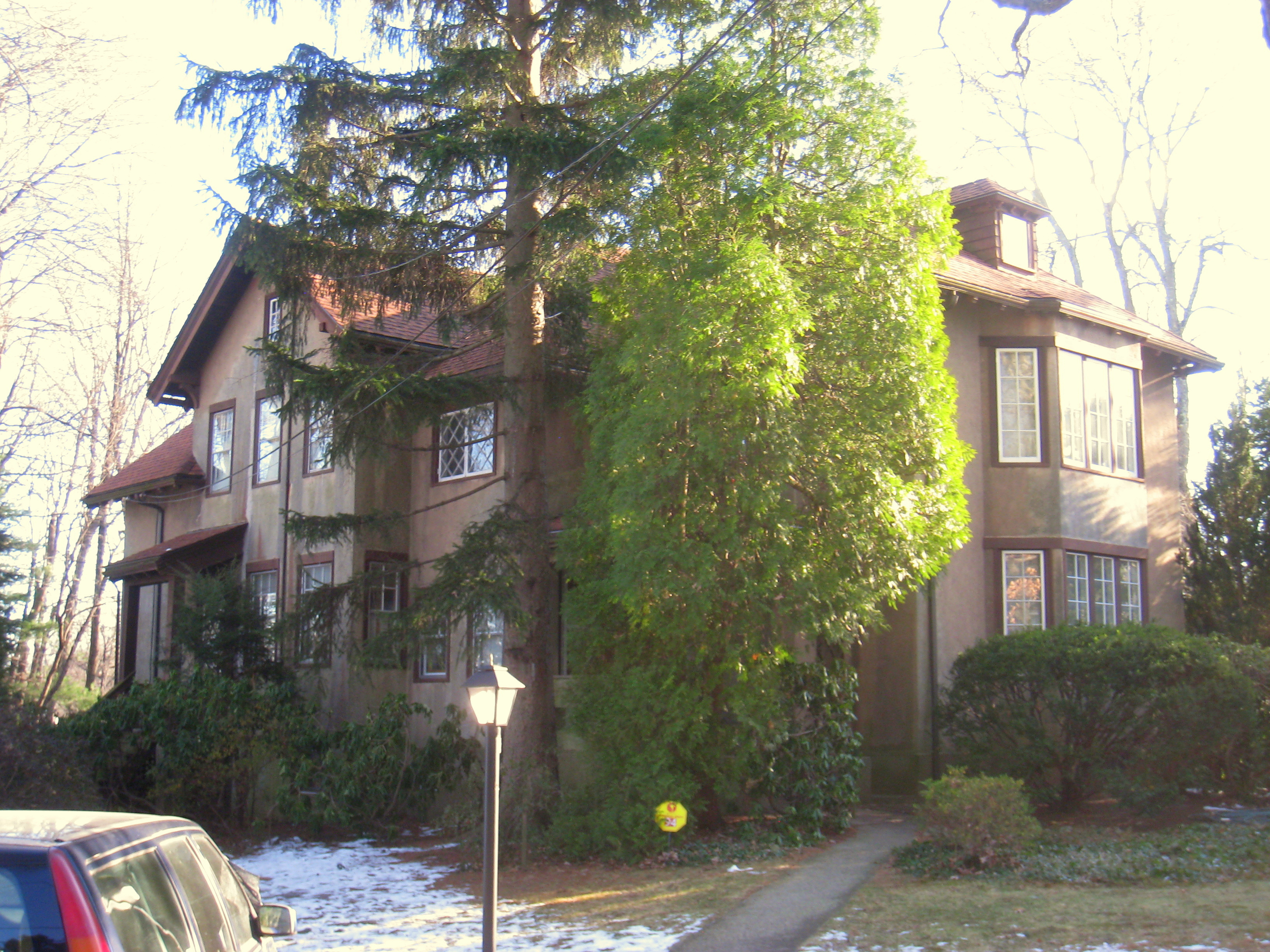

- Location within Massachusetts Location within the United States
- Location: 94 Oakland Avenue, Arlington, Massachusetts
- Coordinates: 42°25′8″N 71°10′44″W
- Built: 1898
- Architectural style: Bungalow/Craftsman
- MPS: Arlington MRA
- NRHP reference No.: 85002680
- Added to NRHP: September 27, 1985

The Allyn House is a historic house in Arlington, Massachusetts. Built about 1898, it is a prominent local example of Craftsman style architecture. The house was listed on the National Register of Historic Places in 1985.

== Description and history ==
The Allyn House stands in the Arlington Heights neighborhood, on the southeast side of Oakland Avenue roughly midway between Cedar Avenue and Gray Street. It occupies an irregular diamond-shaped lot, and is (unlike its neighbors) oriented at an angle to the street. The front of the lot is demarcated by a low rubblestone wall. The house is a 2 1/2-story wood-frame structure, with a stuccoed exterior and brown wooden trim. It has a hip roof with extended eaves, punctuated by hip-roofed dormers with shingled sides. Its front facade is dominated by a full-height polygonal bay, with a band of narrow casement windows in the center section, and single windows on the angled sides. Other Craftsman details include exposed rafter ends and a number of diamond-pane windows.

Significant development in the Arlington Heights area began following the 1872 purchase of the Pierce family properties by the Arlington Land Company. The lot this house stands on was among the Arlington Land Company holdings, and the house was built about 1898. It was owned for many years by Phillip M. Allyn, a publisher who worked in Boston. It is a particularly fine local example of Craftsman architecture.

== See also ==
- National Register of Historic Places listings in Arlington, Massachusetts
