= Whittemore House (Arlington, Massachusetts) =

Historic house in Massachusetts, United States

- U.S. National Register of Historic Places
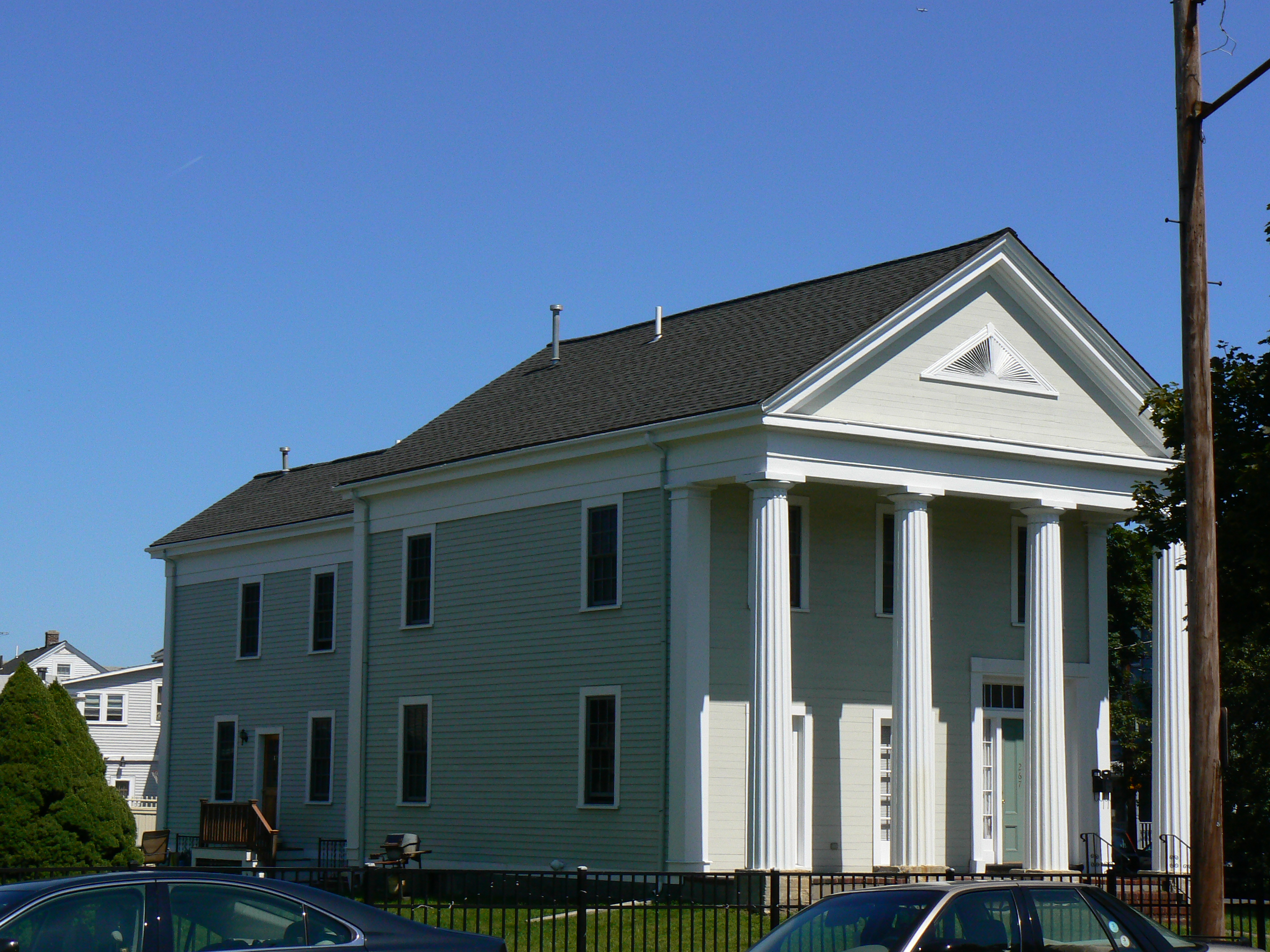
- Picture taken 2008

- Location within Massachusetts Location within the United States
- Location: 267 Broadway, Arlington, Massachusetts
- Coordinates: 42°24′48″N 71°8′54″W
- Built: 1850
- Architectural style: Greek Revival
- MPS: Arlington MRA
- NRHP reference No.: 85001050
- Added to NRHP: April 18, 1985

The Whittemore House is a historic house in Arlington, Massachusetts. The Greek Revival was built c. 1850, and is the only house in Arlington with the full temple-front treatment. It as two-story fluted Doric columns supporting a projecting gable end with a fan louver in the tympanum area. The entrance is located in the rightmost of the front facade's three bays, and is framed by sidelight and transom windows. The building's corners are pilastered, and an entablature encircles the building below the roof.

The house was listed on the National Register of Historic Places in 1985.

== See also ==
- National Register of Historic Places listings in Arlington, Massachusetts
