= Baptist Society Meeting House =

Historic church in Massachusetts, United States

- U.S. National Register of Historic Places
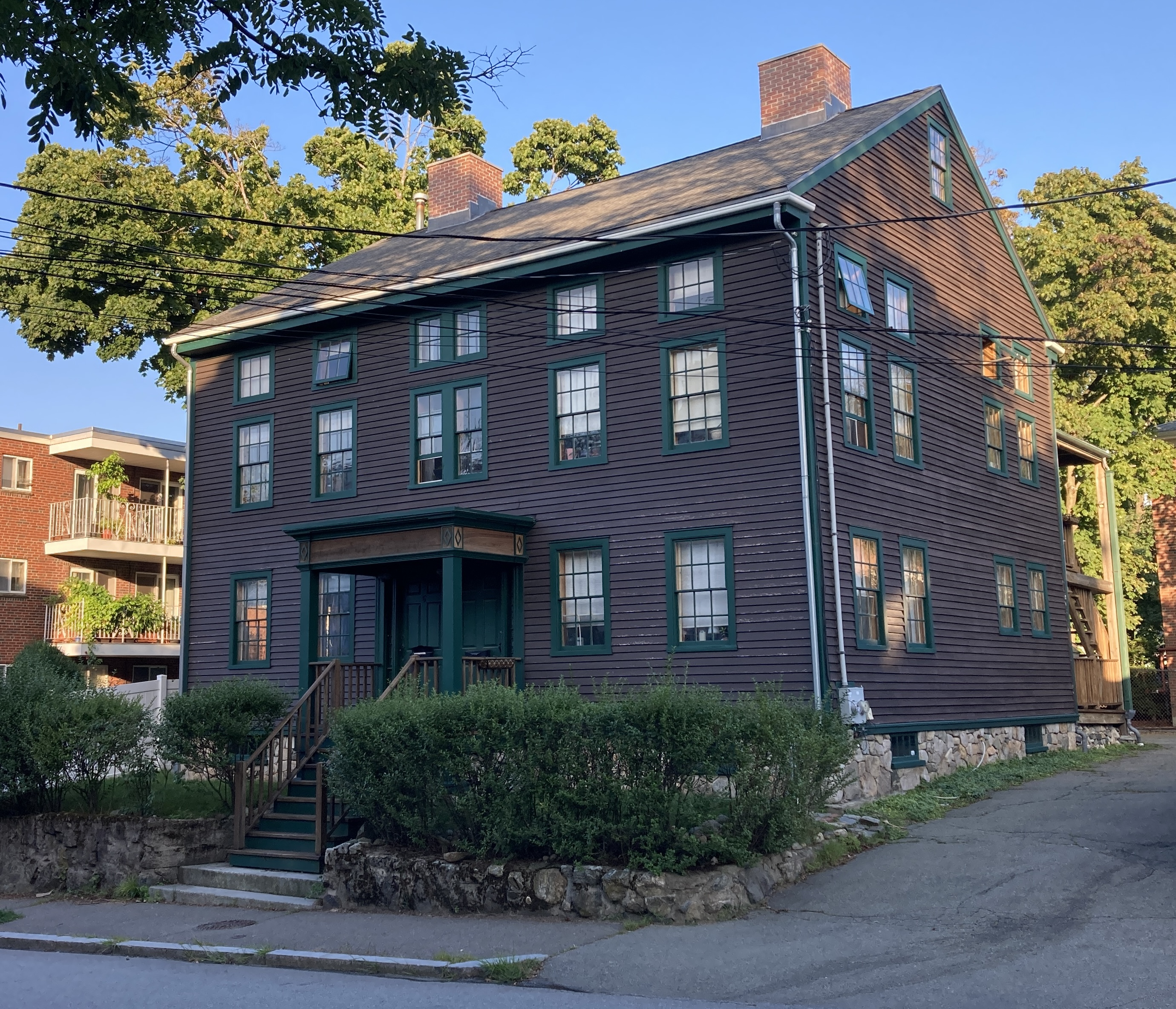

- Location within Massachusetts Location within the United States
- Location: 3–5 Brattle St., Arlington, Massachusetts
- Coordinates: 42°25′14.6″N 71°10′11″W
- Area: less than one acre
- Built: 1790
- Architectural style: Federal
- MPS: Arlington MRA
- NRHP reference No.: 85001023
- Added to NRHP: April 18, 1985

The Baptist Society Meeting House is a historic former Baptist meeting house in Arlington, Massachusetts. Built in 1790, it is the town's oldest surviving church building. Now in residential use, the building was listed on the National Register of Historic Places in 1985.

== Description and history ==
The former Baptist Society Meeting House stands roughly midway between Arlington's town center and the village of Arlington Heights, on the east side of Brattle Street just north of Massachusetts Avenue. It is a 3 1/2-story wood-frame structure, with a gabled roof, two interior chimneys, and a clapboarded exterior. It is five bays wide and four deep, with a symmetrical front facade. At the center of the facade is a double entrance sheltered by a porch supported by square posts. Windows are sash on the first two floors, with smaller windows on the third floor.

Arlington's Baptist Society was organized in 1780, and was the first group to split away from the town's dominant Congregational church. The congregation first met in a number of private places, including the Capt. Benjamin Locke House, until this building was constructed in 1790. The congregation is now housed in Arlington's First Baptist Church, and sold this building into private ownership in 1828. The architecture of this building is in emulation of older meeting houses in Lexington and Concord, dating to the early decades of the 18th century, which are seen in period engravings depicting the Battles of Lexington and Concord which started the American Revolutionary War. Originally set facing Massachusetts Avenue, it was in 1913 moved back in its lot and turned to face Brattle Street.

== See also ==
- National Register of Historic Places listings in Arlington, Massachusetts
