= Capt. Benjamin Locke House =

Historic house in Massachusetts, United States

- U.S. National Register of Historic Places
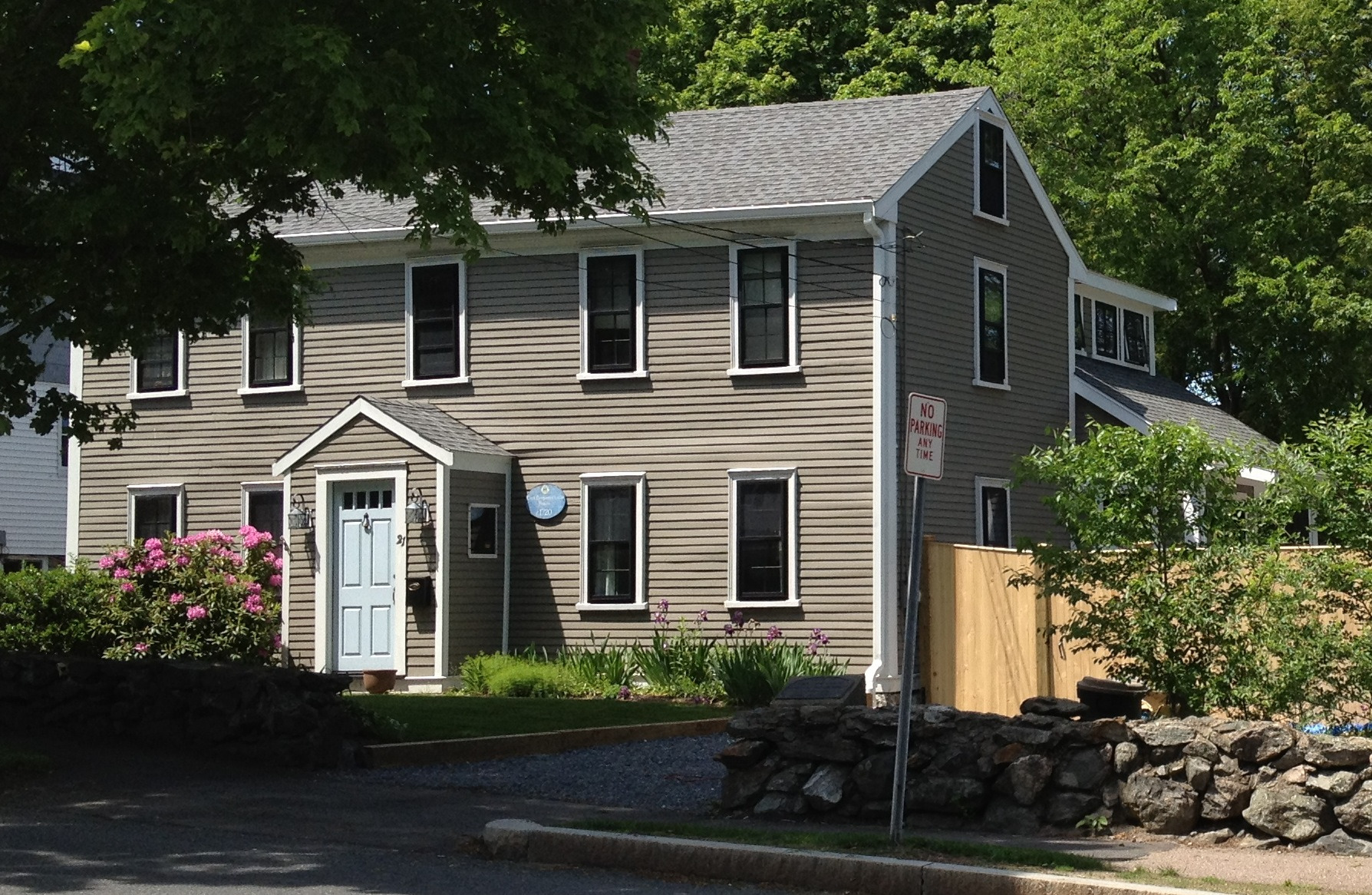
- A photo of the house, taken in April 2012

- Location within Massachusetts Location within the United States
- Location: 21 Appleton Street, Arlington, Massachusetts
- Coordinates: 42°25′24.6″N 71°10′38.4″W
- Built: 1720
- Architectural style: Colonial
- NRHP reference No.: 78000432
- Added to NRHP: July 21, 1978

The Capt. Benjamin Locke House is a historic house in Arlington, Massachusetts. Built c. 1720, this 2 1/2-story wood-frame house is one of the oldest buildings in Arlington, with a distinctive place in its history. It was the home of Benjamin Locke, a captain of the Menotomy (as Arlington was then called) Minutemen, and a skirmish of the 1775 Battles of Lexington and Concord took place near the house. Locke sold the house in 1780 to a Baptist congregation, and it was used by them for services until 1790, when Locke bought it back. The building was the subject of legal action dealing with the separation of church and state, and was later the home of Locke's son, Lieutenant Benjamin Locke.

The house was listed on the National Register of Historic Places in 1978.

== See also ==
- Lt. Benjamin Locke Store
- National Register of Historic Places listings in Arlington, Massachusetts
