= Warren Rawson Building =

- U.S. National Register of Historic Places
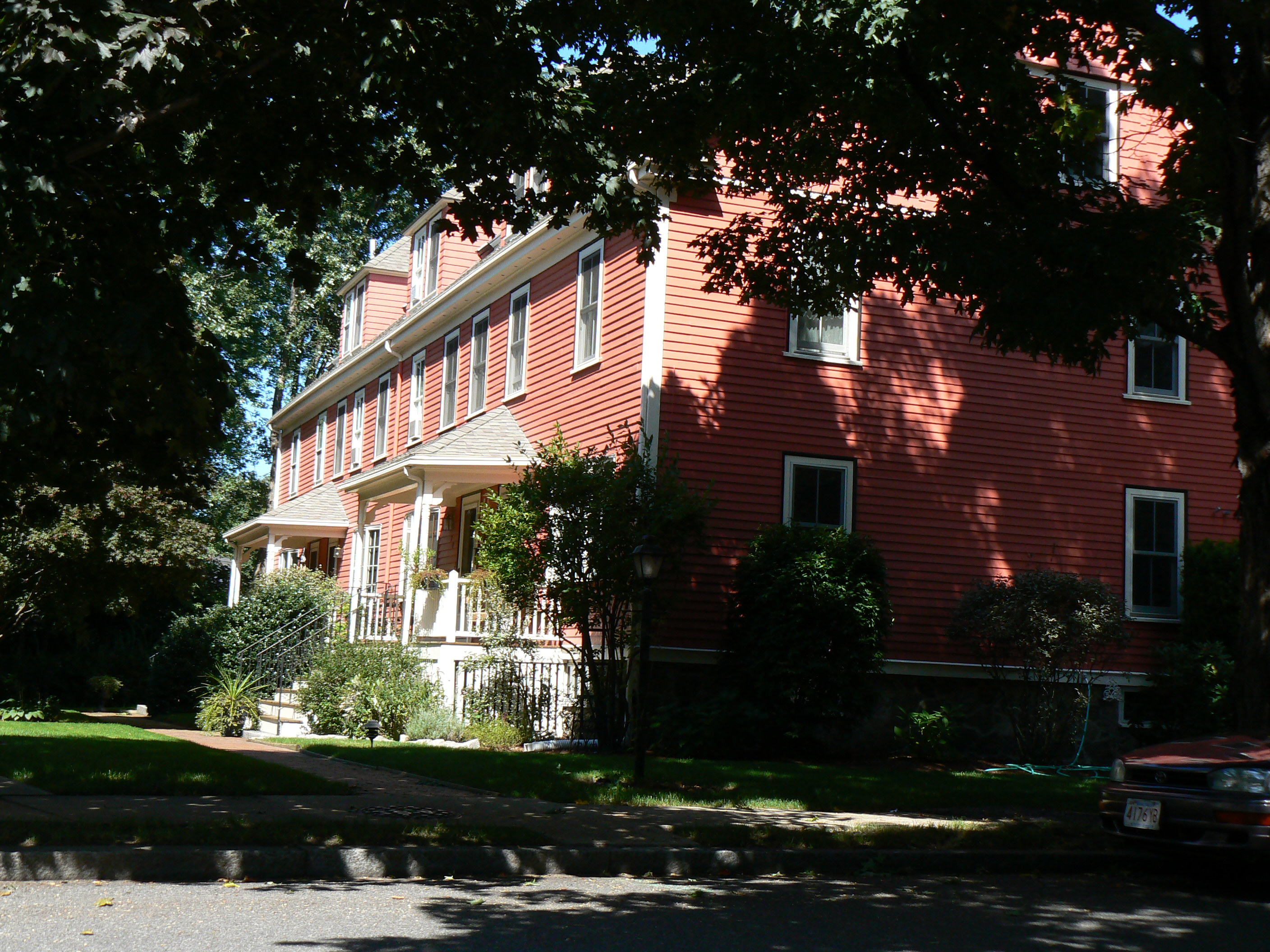

- Location within Massachusetts Location within the United States
- Location: Arlington, Massachusetts
- Coordinates: 42°24′57″N 71°8′49″W
- Built: 1895
- MPS: Arlington MRA
- NRHP reference No.: 85002686
- Added to NRHP: September 27, 1985

The Warren Rawson Building is a historic multi-unit residence at 68-74 Franklin Street in Arlington, Massachusetts. It is a rare surviving farm worker's dormitory, built in 1895 by Warren Rawson, a leading garden farmer in Arlington around the turn of the 20th century. It is a long rectangular 2 1/2-story wood-frame building, with its gable end to the street. Access to the inside is via a pair of entrances on the long side which are sheltered by modest porches.

The building was listed on the National Register of Historic Places in 1985.

== See also ==
- Warren Rawson House, a worker's housing rowhouse built by Rawson
- National Register of Historic Places listings in Arlington, Massachusetts
