= Warren Rawson House =

Historic house in Massachusetts, United States

- U.S. National Register of Historic Places
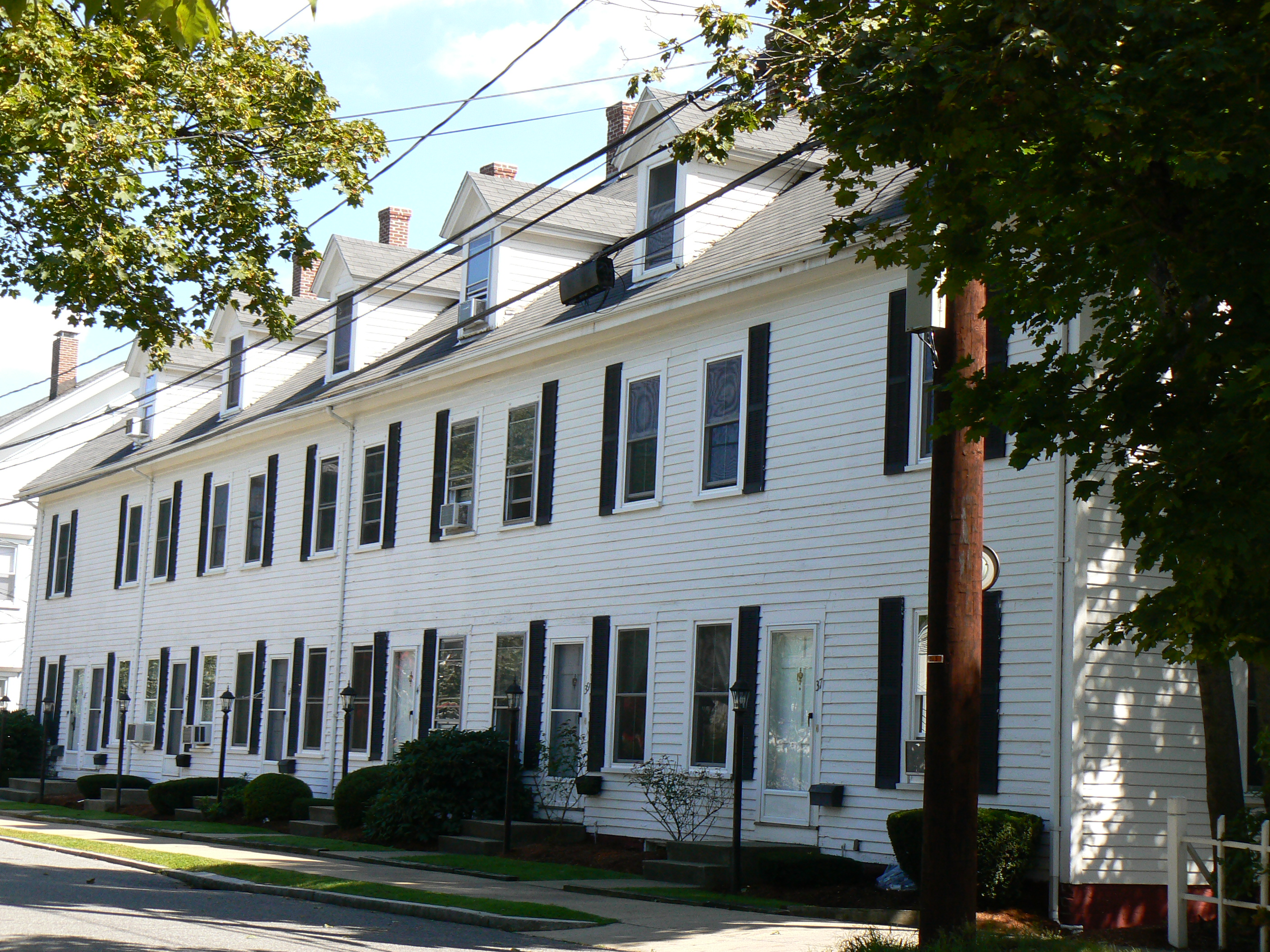

- Location within Massachusetts Location within the United States
- Location: Arlington, Massachusetts
- Coordinates: 42°24′52″N 71°8′35″W
- Built: 1885
- MPS: Arlington MRA
- NRHP reference No.: 85001042
- Added to NRHP: April 18, 1985

The Warren Rawson House is a historic row house at 37–49 Park Street in Arlington, Massachusetts. This utilitarian wood frame rowhouse was built c. 1885-90 by Warren Rawson, a leading farmer in Arlington, to house farm workers. It is one of only a few such multiunit buildings to survive in the town. The rowhouse was listed on the National Register of Historic Places in 1985.

== Description and history ==
The Warren Rawson rowhouse is set on the east side of Park Street in eastern Arlington, in what is now a densely-built residential area. It is a 2 1/2-story wood-frame structure, with seven essentially identical units in a row. Each unit features plainly-decorated doors, windows, and a gabled dormer at the attic level.

Warren Rawson was a leading farmer operating in eastern Arlington in the late 19th century, when garden farming was a major economic activity in the town. This rowhouse is one of two surviving worker housing units he built to house the workers in his farming operations (the other is the Warren Rawson Building on Franklin Street), and are believed to be unique to Arlington. Rawson is documented as having employed as many as 65 workers in his extensive operation, which included the innovative use of steam-heated greenhouses and electric arc lighting. His operations extended from Warren Street to the Mystic River.

== See also ==
- National Register of Historic Places listings in Arlington, Massachusetts
