= Cushman House =

Cushman House may refer to:

- Cushman House (Baker, Louisiana), listed on the NRHP in Louisiana
- Charles L. Cushman House, Auburn, ME, listed on the NRHP in Maine
- Cushman House (Arlington, Massachusetts), listed on the NRHP in Massachusetts
