= Cushman House (Arlington, Massachusetts) =

Historic house in Massachusetts, United States

- U.S. National Register of Historic Places
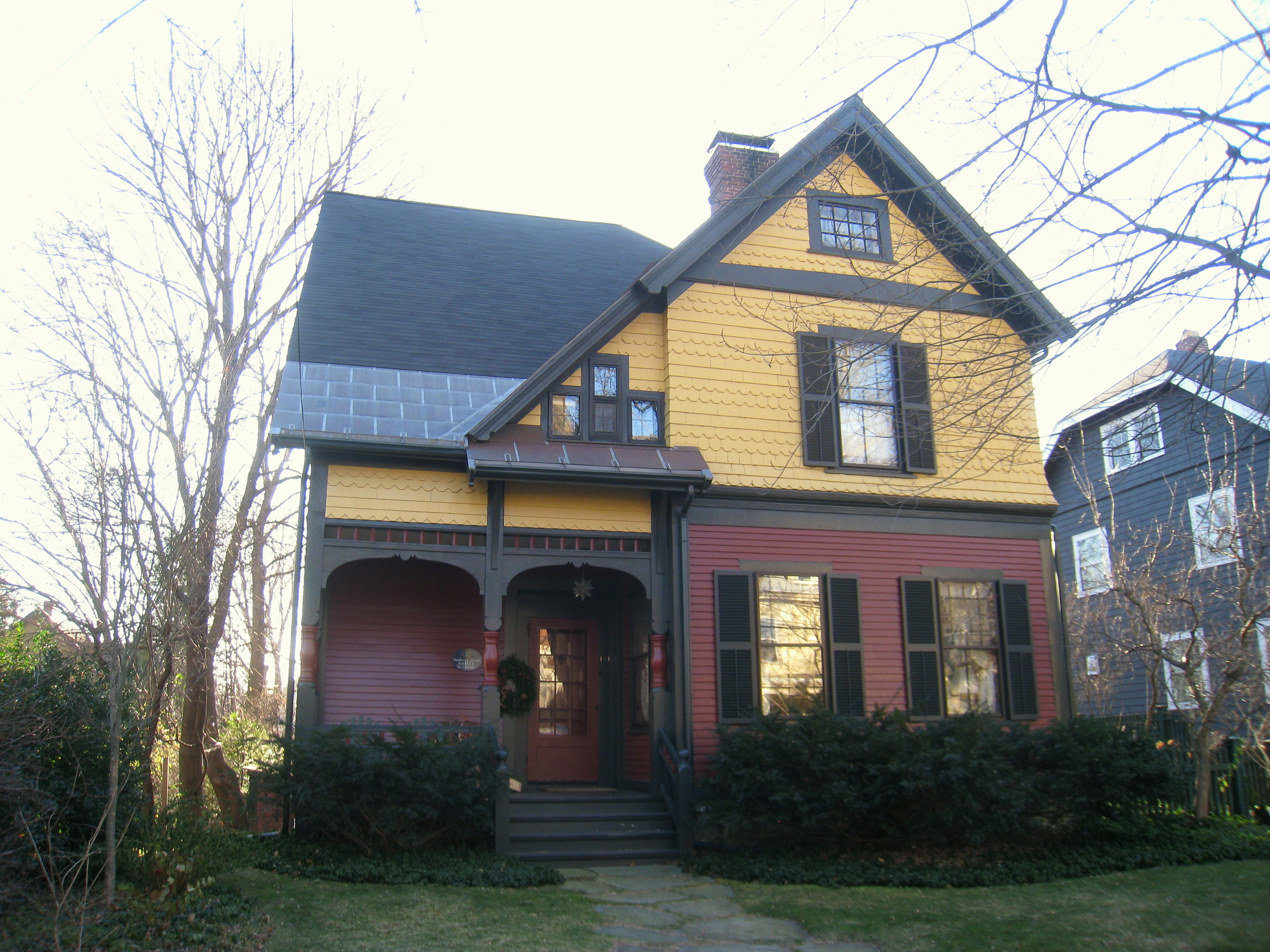

- Location within Massachusetts Location within the United States
- Location: 104 Bartlett Ave., Arlington, Massachusetts
- Coordinates: 42°24′42″N 71°9′48″W
- Built: 1885
- Architectural style: Queen Anne
- MPS: Arlington MRA
- NRHP reference No.: 85001027
- Added to NRHP: April 18, 1985

The Cushman House (also known as the Wentworth House) is a historic house in Arlington, Massachusetts. Built in the mid-1880s and moved to its present location in 1896, it is a well-preserved but fully realized example of Queen Anne architecture. It was listed on the National Register of Historic Places in 1985.

== Description and history ==
The Cushman House stands in a residential neighborhood on the south side of Arlington Center, on the east side of Bartlett Avenue midway between Gray and Woodland Streets. It is a 2 1/2-story wood-frame structure, with a cross-gabled roof and an exterior of wooden clapboards and shingles. It is roughly T-shaped, with its entry porch located in the crook of the T, with turned posts and brackets forming arches supporting the porch roof. The siding at the upper levels is partly standard wooden shingles, and partly scallop-cut rows, giving variety to the surface.

The house was built in 1884-1885 as a rental property by Thomas and John Gray, on the former Fowle estate, and was originally located facing Jason Street. The house was purchased and moved in 1896 by Mr. and Mrs Gardner Cushman, who built their Colonial Revival mansion (72 Irving Street) partly on that land. In 1897, Fannie Cushman sold this house to George and Annie Wentworth, who lived there some twenty years. It is one of Arlington's best-preserved examples of a modest Queen Anne house, a style more frequently seen than the more elaborate Queen Anne houses found on Pleasant Street.

== See also ==
- National Register of Historic Places listings in Arlington, Massachusetts
